= The Best of Apocalyptica =

Greatest hits album by Apocalyptica
- Released: 21 September 2002
- Recorded: 1996–2002
- Studio: Millbrook Studios, Helsinki (Inquisition Symphony)
- Genre: Cello metal, classical
- Label: Universal

Apocalyptica chronology
Cult (2000)	The Best of Apocalyptica (2002)	Reflections (2003)

Professional ratings
Review scores
Source	Rating
Allmusic	3.5/5 stars

The Best of Apocalyptica is a Greatest hits album released in 2002 by the cello metal group Apocalyptica. It contains covers from their previous releases and was only released in Japan.

== Track listing ==
No.	Title	Note	Length
1.	"Drive"	^{Note 1}
2.	"Hope"	^{Note 2}
3.	"Enter Sandman (Metallica cover, from Metallica)"	^{Note 3}
4.	"Nothing Else Matters (Metallica cover, from Metallica)"	^{Note 4}
5.	"Pray!"	^{Note 2}
6.	"Path"	^{Note 2}
7.	"The Unforgiven (Metallica cover, from Metallica)"	^{Note 3}
8.	"Refuse/Resist (Sepultura cover, from Chaos A.D.)"	^{Note 4}
9.	"Kaamos"	^{Note 2}
10.	"Inquisition Symphony (Sepultura cover, from Schizophrenia)"	^{Note 4}
11.	"Romance"	^{Note 2}
12.	"Harmageddon"	^{Note 4}
13.	"Hall of the Mountain King (Edvard Grieg cover, from Peer Gynt, Op. 23, Act II, Pt. 5)"	^{Note 2}

=== Notes ===
1. ^Note 1 This song would later be released on the album Reflections titled as "Drive".
2. ^Note 2 These songs are from the album Cult.
3. ^Note 3 These songs are from the album Plays Metallica by Four Cellos.
4. ^Note 4 These songs are from the album Inquisition Symphony.

== Credits ==
=== Apocalyptica ===
- Eicca Toppinen – cello
- Perttu Kivilaakso – cello
- Paavo Lötjönen – cello

=== Additional personnel ===
- Max Lilja – cello (2-13)
- Antero Manninen – cello (3, 4, 7, 8, 10 & 12)
