= Shadowmaker (Apocalyptica album) =

Studio album by Apocalyptica
- Released: 17 April 2015
- Genre: Symphonic metal, progressive metal, alternative metal, cello rock
- Length: 53:57 (standard edition); 65:09 (limited edition)
- Label: Better Noise/Eleven Seven Music
- Producer: Nick Raskulinecz

Apocalyptica chronology
Wagner Reloaded-Live in Leipzig (2013)	Shadowmaker (2015)	Cell-0 (2020)

Singles from Shadowmaker
- 1. "Shadowmaker" Released: 15 December 2014; 2. "Cold Blood" Released: 13 February 2015

Shadowmaker is the eighth studio album by the Finnish cello metal band Apocalyptica. It was released on 17 April 2015 in Europe and Australia, 20 April in the UK, France and Latin America, 21 April in the U.S. and Canada and 22 April in Japan. It is the band's first album with one single vocalist, Franky Perez.

Commenting on the album, member Eicca Toppinen said:

I think it's a totally new kind of record for Apocalyptica especially because we have one singer on the whole album and I think it's making the whole album more solid. It's more of a band record compared to the album that we have had guest vocalists so I think it's more solid.

== Background and recording ==
After the 7th Symphony tour, the band took some time off and did nothing except for Wagner Reloaded-Live in Leipzig. After the break, they reunited and discussed the next album. According to Toppinen, "[...] if we wanted to do something, we have to do exactly what we want to do and this record is the result of that, that journey. We wanted to challenge ourselves even more and we wanted to be tight as a band before the pre-production."

Regarding Franky Perez's participation, Toppinen said the band composed many vocal songs for the album, and having multiple guest vocalists was not the most interesting option for them at the time, because it always involves contacting too many labels and producers and it is more difficult to control everything. He also said the band was looking for a vocalist to make the entire record, tour with them and "make the whole thing more understandable for people, to make the working circumstances more comfortable for us where things are not so dependant on people outside of the band". In order to find a singer, the label came up with a list of 20–25 suggestions. The band analyzed it and asked five of them to record something, and then they invited three of them to sing a section of "Hole in My Soul", one of the album's tracks. Perez was ultimately chosen and accepted it since he was not committed to anything other than his solo career. Toppinen said he "loves" Perez's voice and commented: "He's not just a regular singer. He has a very soulful sound and he's able to sing different styles which is perfect for Apocalyptica because our songs are not only heavy metal, it's a variety of different colors and different dynamics and the singer needs to match that. [...] We did a couple of shows in Canada last August, a test run and it worked perfectly together".

The album was mostly pre-produced in Nashville with producer Nick Raskulinecz, with additional work being done by the band in Finland. Perez was part of the album's pre-production and helped the band arrange the songs, and had only two weeks to work on everything. Commenting on the recording process, Perez said: "We were a team, in that each one had the right to speak and every opinion in the room was completely taken into account and were valuable."

== Song information ==
"I-III-V Seed of Chaos" was conceived as the album opener, but it was one of the last tracks to be prepared. "Cold Blood" was the last song to be written and was originally slower in its demo version. "Shadowmaker" was the first song to be written. Toppinen explained he wanted the song to sound both as an instrumental and a vocal track. It was co-written by Johnny Andrews, with whom the band wrote song such as "End of Me" and "I'm Not Jesus". "Slow Burn" is a "ballad that isn't a ballad" and was composed as a pair of "Shadowmaker". "Reign of Fear", which was longer in its original version, is influenced by 1980's thrash metal bands.

"Hole in My Soul" is a ballad which Toppinen describes as an "emotional" track. "House of Chains" has elements of nu metal, though Toppinen says he is not a big fan of the genre. "Riot Lights" was the second song written for the album, and was conceived to be a "catchy" instrumental song, and Toppinen recurred to trance music to get inspiration for the main riff. "Come Back Down" was originally conceived as a seven-minute long progressive instrumental piece, but since it did not reach the desired level, it was shortened and turned into a vocal track. "Til Death Do Us Part" was originally just three minutes long, but Raskulinecz asked them to make it longer, and Toppinen expressed satisfaction with the result. "Dead Man's Eyes" was created as a mixture of the best parts of two songs written by Kivilaakso. It is the ending track and Toppinen considered it a proper conclusion for the record.

== Track listing ==
All tracks produced by Nick Raskulinecz.

No.	Title	Writer(s)	Length
1.	"I-III-V Seed of Chaos" (instrumental)	Eicca Toppinen, Perttu Kivilaakso, Paavo Lötjönen, Mikko Sirén	1:26
2.	"Cold Blood"	Toppinen, Martin Hansen	3:27
3.	"Shadowmaker"	Toppinen, Johnny Andrews, Franky Perez	7:35
4.	"Slow Burn"	Toppinen, Andrews, Perez	4:44
5.	"Reign of Fear" (deluxe bonus track, instrumental)	Toppinen	6:54
6.	"Hole in My Soul"	Toppinen, Hansen, Perez	4:05
7.	"House of Chains"	Toppinen, Andrews	3:28
8.	"Riot Lights" (instrumental)	Toppinen	6:40
9.	"Come Back Down" (deluxe bonus track)	Toppinen, Perez	4:24
10.	"Sea Song (You Waded Out)"	Toppinen, Guy Sigsworth, Richard Walters	4:54
11.	"Till Death Do Us Part" (instrumental)	Kivilaakso	7:50
12.	"Dead Man's Eyes"	Kivilaakso, Perez	9:42
Total length:			65:09

== Release ==
Shadowmaker will be released in five different formats.

=== Standard CD ===
Contains the standard 10-track album.

=== Double vinyl LP ===
Contains the standard 10-track album and two bonus tracks plus CD.

=== Mediabook deluxe CD ===
Contains 12 songs (additional tracks being "Reign of Fear" and "Come Back Down").

=== Digital download ===
Digital download version includes 10 songs plus 2 bonus tracks.

=== Boxset ===
A collector's boxset including limited edition CD, double vinyl LP, vinyl-sized special booklet, band photograph, Apocalyptica/Shadowmaker candlelight and download code for exclusive digital content.

== Reception ==
Professional ratings
Review scores
Source	Rating
Altsounds	4/5 stars
RAMzine	4/5 stars
MusicReviewRadar	4/5 stars

The album received generally positive reviews; many praising Apocalyptica's constantly evolving blend of classic and metal, as well as the new lead singer, Franky Perez.

Samantha Wu of Lithium magazine wrote the following in her review of the album, with regards to the new lead singer; "It appears the perfect balance: the lyrics don't take away from the orchestral instrumentation nor the cellos take away from the lyrics." MusicReviewRadar stated "you can feel the good old Apocalyptica in a perfect connection with Franky […] dazzle us with rich, heavy and soulful tracks where the powerful chords fuse seamlessly with the menacing drum beat and grow in intensity until Apocalyptica burst into flames".

== Charts ==
Chart (2015)	Provider	Peak position
Finnish Albums Chart	IFPI/YLE	7
French Albums Chart	Media Control AG	76
Austrian Albums Chart	Media Control GFK International Austria	31
Swiss Albums Chart	SNE	15

== Personnel ==
- Perttu Kivilaakso – lead cello
- Eicca Toppinen – rhythm cello
- Paavo Lötjönen – bass cello
- Mikko Sirén – drums
- Franky Perez – vocals
- Nick Raskulinecz – production
- Greg Fidelman – mixing
