= Cell-0 =

2020 studio album by Apocalyptica

Studio album by Apocalyptica
- Released: 10 January 2020
- Recorded: 2019
- Venue: Sonic Pump Studios
- Genre: Cello metal, symphonic metal, progressive metal
- Length: 53:36
- Label: Silver Lining Music
- Producer: Apocalyptica

Apocalyptica chronology
Shadowmaker (2015)	Cell-0 (2020)	Plays Metallica, Vol. 2 (2024)

Singles from Cell-0
- 1. "Ashes of the Modern World" Released: 3 October 2019; 2. "Rise" Released: 1 November 2019; 3. "En Route to Mayhem" Released: 12 December 2019; 4. "Cell-0" Released: 10 January 2020

Professional ratings
Review scores
Source	Rating
Classic Rock	7/10
Consequence of Sound	B+
The Spill Magazine	4.5/5 stars

Cell-0 (pronounced "Cell Zero") is the ninth studio album by Finnish cello metal band Apocalyptica. It was released on 10 January 2020. It is the band's first fully instrumental album since 2003's Reflections, and their first studio release since Shadowmaker, published 4 years and 9 months earlier, marking their longest gap between studio albums.

== Background ==
Cell-0 was prepared after a lengthy tour in celebration of the 20th anniversary of their debut album, the instrumental Metallica tribute release Plays Metallica by Four Cellos (1996). Such performances inspired them to go back to all-instrumental music, which they hadn't done in 17 years. The audience's positive response to instrumental songs was also taken into account.

It wasn't intended for the tour to be so long, but the positive fan reaction to the announcement of the first shows resulted in more dates being added, increasing the total number of performances from the originally planned 30 to a total of 230. Combined with the Shadowmaker tour shows, the band had played around 500 shows between both albums.

== Recording and promotion ==
Cell-0 took two months to be written and was recorded, edited and mixed within a five-month period.

It was self-produced by the band and conceived without a label behind it, resulting in more creative freedom, which led cellist Perttu Kivilaakso to notice some progressive elements in their music, specially on the song "Fire & Ice", which begins with Celtic melodies performed by Nightwish flutist Troy Donockley and ends with riffs that he described as "chaotic" and "complex".

On 3 June 2019, the band announced they had completed work on the album, with recording lasting for three months at Sonic Pump Studios, in Helsinki. Later that month, they announced their signing to Silver Lining Music, through which they would release the yet-to-announce studio effort.

On 3 October, the band announced the album's title, cover art and release date. They commented that "it is tough to express without lyrics, but in Cell-0, we found particles of our universe previously unknown to us. Millions of notes combine to create music just as millions of cells combine to create life, and when you visualize the whole thing, similar patterns appear."

On the same day, they released a video for the album opener "Ashes of the Modern World", directed by Ville Juurikkala. On 1 November, they released a video for "Rise", directed by Lisa Mann in collaboration with cinematographer Jason George and meant to depict a live impressionistic painting. On 12 December, another video was released, this time for "En Route to Mayhem", which discuses humans' actions towards life on the planet. On 10 January 2020, simultaneously with the album release, the audio of the title track "Cell-0" was released.

On December 16, 2022, they released a new version of Rise, named Rise Again, with Epica's Simone Simons on vocals, prior to their shared European tour in 2023.

== Concept ==
The album revolves around a concept created by the band which relates to a "God particle". According to drummer Mikko Sirén, "in our heads, there is this undefined thing that you cannot pinpoint, that you cannot see or feel, but it is there. That's kind of the center of everything in this album." He also said:

In the album, there is a lot about things, a lot about particles, how everything is made out of the tiniest little particles if you talk about cells to create something that is living, that a lot of cells are needed to create something, and atom-level, you need a lot of atoms to create something. But even though cells would create something, it doesn't make anything living. There needs to be this 'Cell-0', there needs to be this essence of something. And it came basically from the musical perspective. If you think of music, it's made of tiny particles. There are notes, there are rests, there are rhythms, there are this and this and this. When you put them together, it's almost like music, but it's missing the soul, the soul of the song, which is something you cannot put on a note. You cannot put it in a music sheet. It's the emotion. The x-factor. That's the 'Cell-0' for music.

He also says the album discusses "politics or social, environmental issues or something like that. It was one of those things that amazingly people have gotten disconnected from each other, from nature, from the earth and everything like that. Maybe the 'Cell-0' is the one thing we lost. We don't have the ability to connect anymore, especially in the last ten years. The world has changed."

The music also reflects humanity's ability to build and destroy. "Humanity is incredible when it comes to building something, but we are capable of destroying even more easily. Like that, the songs burst into pieces at times. We wanted to take a philosophical look at what man builds and what he destroys.

=== Cover ===
The cover of Cell-0 depicts a cello falling apart in particles, so it is linked to the overall particle concept of the album. Kivilaakso said "since we're going back to our roots, it seemed obvious to us to put the cello in front on the cover".

== Track listing ==
Cell-0 track listing
No.	Title	Length
1.	"Ashes of the Modern World"	6:29
2.	"Cell-0"	9:57
3.	"Rise"	5:22
4.	"En Route to Mayhem"	5:28
5.	"Call My Name"	3:55
6.	"Fire & Ice" (featuring Troy Donockley)	5:21
7.	"Scream for the Silent"	5:12
8.	"Catharsis"	4:58
9.	"Beyond the Stars"	6:54
Total length:		53:36

== Personnel ==
Apocalyptica

- Perttu Kivilaakso – lead cello, programming, arrangements
- Eicca Toppinen – rhythm cello, keyboards, programming, arrangements
- Paavo Lötjönen – bass cello
- Mikko Sirén – drums, percussion

Guest performances

- Troy Donockley – Uilleann pipes, bagpipes on "Fire & Ice"

Technical personnel

- Andrew Scheps – mixing

== Charts ==
Sales chart performance for Cell-0
Chart (2020)	Peak position
Finnish Albums (Suomen virallinen lista)	13
French Albums (SNEP)	192
German Albums (Offizielle Top 100)	24
Polish Albums (ZPAV)	37
Scottish Albums (OCC)	69
Spanish Albums (PROMUSICAE)	76
Swiss Albums (Schweizer Hitparade)	11

== See also ==
- List of 2020 albums
