= Worlds Collide (Apocalyptica album) =

Studio album by Apocalyptica
- Released: 14 September 2007
- Recorded: 2006–2007
- Genres: Alternative metal; hard rock; neoclassical metal
- Length: 47:55
- Labels: 20-20 Ent; Jive; Zomba Label Group; Sony BMG
- Producers: Jacob Hellner, Howard Benson (track #8 only on the North American edition)

Apocalyptica chronology
Apocalyptica (2005)	Worlds Collide (2007)	7th Symphony (2010)

Singles from Worlds Collide
- 1. "I'm Not Jesus" Released: 31 August 2007; 2. "S.O.S. (Anything But Love)" Released: 18 January 2008; 3. "I Don't Care" Released: 30 May 2008

Worlds Collide is the sixth studio album from Finnish classical band, Apocalyptica. While this album is the sixth major release, it is also (including singles, videos, box sets, etc.) the twenty-eighth release overall.

== Track listing ==
No.	Title	Length
1.	"Worlds Collide"	4:28
2.	"Grace" (featuring Tomoyasu Hotei)	4:09
3.	"I'm Not Jesus" (featuring Corey Taylor)	3:34
4.	"Ion"	3:46
5.	"Helden" (David Bowie cover from "Heroes"; featuring Till Lindemann)	4:18
6.	"Stroke"	4:32
7.	"Last Hope" (featuring Dave Lombardo)	4:47
8.	"I Don't Care" (featuring Adam Gontier) (omitted on North American edition)	3:57
9.	"Burn"	4:16
10.	"S.O.S. (Anything But Love)" (featuring Cristina Scabbia)	4:19
11.	"Peace"	5:49
Total length:		47:55

North American edition
No.	Title	Length
8.	"I Don't Care" (featuring Adam Gontier) (re-recorded version)	3:41

European special edition bonus tracks
No.	Title	Length
12.	"Ural"	5:41
13.	"Dreamer"	3:36

Digital download deluxe edition bonus track
No.	Title	Length
12.	"Ural"	5:41
13.	"Dreamer"	3:36
14.	"I Don't Care" (Live at XM Radio)	3:37
15.	"I'm Not Jesus" (Video; feat. Corey Taylor)	3:34

Japanese bonus tracks
No.	Title	Length
12.	"Ural"	5:41
13.	"Lies"	3:43
14.	"Dreamer"	3:36

iTunes exclusive
No.	Title	Length
12.	"I'm Not Jesus" (Pain remix; feat. Corey Taylor)	3:44
13.	"I'm Not Jesus" (Albert Vorne remix; feat. Corey Taylor)	8:02

Special edition bonus DVD
No.	Title	Length
1.	"I'm Not Jesus" (music video)
2.	"Making of I'm Not Jesus"
3.	"Interview"
4.	"Photo Gallery"

Japanese special edition bonus DVD
No.	Title	Length
1.	"I'm Not Jesus" (music video)
2.	"Making of I'm Not Jesus"
3.	"Interview"
4.	"Interview in Japan"
5.	"Master of Puppets" (live)
6.	"Betrayal" (live)
7.	"Photo Gallery"

Japanese promotional edition bonus DVD
No.	Title	Length
1.	"Grace" (music video)
2.	"I Don't Care" (music video)
3.	"S.O.S. (Anything But Love)" (music video)
4.	"I'm Not Jesus" (music video)
5.	"Making of I'm Not Jesus"
6.	"Interview"
7.	"Interview in Japan"
8.	"Master of Puppets" (live)
9.	"Betrayal" (live)
10.	"Photo Gallery"

== Personnel ==
Apocalyptica

- Eicca Toppinen – rhythm cello
- Perttu Kivilaakso – bass cello
- Paavo Lötjönen – lead cello
- Mikko Sirén – drums

Musical guests and technical staff

"I'm Not Jesus"

- Corey Taylor – vocals
- Pain – remix
- Rich Costey – mixing, also on "I Don't Care"

Songwriters

- Johnny Andrews – also on "S.O.S (Anything but Love)"
- Geno Lenardo

"S.O.S (Anything but Love)"

- Cristina Scabbia – lead vocals
- Mats Levén – backing vocals

"Helden"

- Till Lindemann – vocals
- Richard Kruspe – electric guitar
- David Bowie – songwriter
- Brian Eno – songwriter

"I Don't Care"

- Adam Gontier – vocals, songwriter
- Max Martin – songwriter
- Paul Bushnell – bass
- Howard Benson – keyboards, programming, Hammond B3, Korg Trinity, piano, electric piano, Fender rhodes, farfisa, sequencing
- Paul Decarli – digital editing
- Hatsukazu Inagaki – engineering
- Mike Plotnikoff – recording

Guitar staff

- Phil X – electric guitar
- Marc Vangool – guitar technician

Other guests

- Tomoyasu Hotei – guitar and music on "Grace"
- Dave Lombardo – drums on "Last Hope"

Album inlay

- Ville Akseli – photography
- Takehiko Maeda – Japanese liner notes

Other technical staff

- Stefan Glaumann – mixing
- Justin Gerrish – mix assisting
- Svante Forsback – mastering (1–4, 6, 7, 12 & 13)
- Ted Jensen – mastering (5, 8–11)
- Henka Johansson – drum technician
- Ulf Kruckenberg – drum recording

== Charts ==
Professional ratings
Review scores
Source	Rating
AllMusic	4/5 stars
Collector's Guide to Heavy Metal	8/10
Kerrang	3/5 stars
Metal Hammer	(8/10)

Chart (2007–2008)	Peak position
Austrian Albums Chart	13
Finnish Albums Chart	8
German Albums Chart	10
Hungarian Albums Chart	26
Japanese Albums Chart	118
Swiss Music Chart	10
U.S. Billboard 200	59
U.S. Billboard Top Independent Albums	7
U.S. Billboard Top Rock Albums	7

Chart (2026)	Peak position
US Top Classical Crossover Albums (Billboard)	13

== Certifications ==
Region	Certification	Certified units/sales
Russia (NFPF)	Gold	10,000^{*}
United States (RIAA)	Gold	500,000^{‡}
^{*} Sales figures based on certification alone.^{‡} Sales+streaming figures based on certification alone.

== Release history ==
Region	Date
Germany, Austria & Switzerland	14 September 2007
Mexico & Australia	17 September 2007
Russia	19 September 2007
Japan	26 September 2007
Ireland	28 September 2007
Canada	5 February 2008
America	15 April 2008
