= Plays Metallica, Vol. 2 =

2024 studio album by Apocalyptica

Studio album by Apocalyptica
- Released: 7 June 2024
- Recorded: 2023
- Studio: JHOC, Pasadena, California
- Genre: Cello metal, symphonic metal, heavy metal, thrash metal
- Length: 49:38
- Label: Throwdown Entertainment
- Producer: Joe Barresi

Apocalyptica chronology
Cell-0 (2020)	Plays Metallica, Vol. 2 (2024)

Singles from Plays Metallica, Vol. 2
- 1. "One" Released: May 2024; 2. "The Call of Ktulu" Released: 5 June 2024

Professional ratings
Review scores
Source	Rating
Blabbermouth.net	7.5/10
Louder Sound	3.5/5 stars

Plays Metallica, Vol. 2 is the tenth studio album by Finnish Cello metal band Apocalyptica, released on 7 June 2024. It is their second full cover album and a follow-up to Plays Metallica by Four Cellos (1996). The album features new Metallica covers such as "The Four Horsemen" and "The Unforgiven II", as well as a new recording of "One" with narration by Metallica vocalist James Hetfield and bassist Robert Trujillo. It also includes a cover of "The Call of Ktulu" featuring the original bass master track recorded by Cliff Burton in 1984.

Apocalyptica celebrated the release of Plays Metallica, Vol. 2 with a special concert at Helsinki Ice Hall on 8 June 2024. The band has embarked on a North American tour in support of the album with Nita Strauss in February to March 2025.

== Track listing ==
Plays Metallica, Vol. 2 track listing
No.	Title	Writer(s)	Original Metallica album	Length
1.	"Ride the Lightning"	James Hetfield; Lars Ulrich; Cliff Burton; Dave Mustaine	from Ride the Lightning	6:47
2.	"St. Anger"	Hetfield; Ulrich; Bob Rock; Kirk Hammett	from St. Anger	4:18
3.	"The Unforgiven II"	Hetfield; Ulrich; Hammett	from Reload	4:05
4.	"Blackened" (featuring Dave Lombardo)	Hetfield; Ulrich; Jason Newsted	from ...And Justice for All	5:59
5.	"The Call of Ktulu" (sampling Cliff Burton's original bassline)	Hetfield; Ulrich; Burton; Mustaine	from Ride the Lightning	7:27
6.	"The Four Horsemen" (featuring Robert Trujillo)	Hetfield; Ulrich; Mustaine	from Kill 'Em All	4:46
7.	"Holier than Thou"	Hetfield; Ulrich	from Metallica	3:43
8.	"To Live Is to Die"	Hetfield; Ulrich; Burton	from ...And Justice for All	2:58
9.	"One" (featuring Robert Trujillo and James Hetfield)	Hetfield; Ulrich	from ...And Justice for All	9:35
Total length:				49:38

== Personnel ==
Apocalyptica

- Perttu Kivilaakso – cello
- Eicca Toppinen – cello, keyboards
- Paavo Lötjönen – bass cello
- Mikko Sirén – drums, keyboards, double bass

Guest performances

- Tye Trujillo – bass guitar on tracks 1, 2, 3, 4, and 7
- Dave Lombardo – drums on track 4
- Cliff Burton – bass guitar on track 5 (sampled)
- Robert Trujillo – bass guitar on tracks 6 and 9
- James Hetfield – spoken vocals on track 9

== Charts ==
Sales chart performance for Plays Metallica, Vol. 2
Chart (2024)	Peak position
Finnish Albums (Suomen virallinen lista)	25
German Albums (Offizielle Top 100)	19
Scottish Albums (OCC)	99
Swiss Albums (Schweizer Hitparade)	20
