= 7th Symphony (album) =

Studio album by Apocalyptica
- Released: August 20, 2010
- Recorded: 2010
- Genres: Progressive metal; alternative metal; symphonic metal; hard rock
- Length: 52:03 (standard edition); 57:42 (deluxe edition)
- Labels: Sony Music Germany/Columbia, Jive (US)
- Producers: Joe Barresi; Howard Benson

Apocalyptica chronology
Worlds Collide (2007)	7th Symphony (2010)	Wagner Reloaded-Live in Leipzig (2013)

Singles from 7th Symphony
- 1. "End of Me" Released: June 28, 2010; 2. "Broken Pieces" Released: October 22, 2010; 3. "Not Strong Enough" Released: November 1, 2010 (UK)

7th Symphony is the seventh studio album by the Finnish cello metal band Apocalyptica. It was released on August 20, 2010, in Germany, Switzerland and Austria, August 23, 2010, in the rest of the world, and August 24, 2010, in the U.S. and Canada. Released three years after their previous album Worlds Collide, Apocalyptica continued the practice of having four tracks with featured vocalists, while the remaining tracks are all instrumental. Dave Lombardo of Slayer was once again featured on drums, on the track entitled "2010". The band toured with touring vocalist Tipe Johnson in support of the album in Europe, Mexico, Canada, the US and Venezuela since the summer of 2010.

The first single "End of Me" with Gavin Rossdale of Bush on vocals, was premiered on Finnish Radio Ylex on June 7, 2010. It received radio play June 28, 2010, and its release date was on August 6, 2010, in Germany. The second single from the album, "Broken Pieces" with Lacey Sturm, formerly of Flyleaf, was released in October 2010. The third single, "Not Strong Enough" featuring Brent Smith, was released in November 2010, but not in the US, where another version of the song, featuring Doug Robb of Hoobastank on vocals, started playing on US radio on January 18, 2011. The song was re-recorded with Robb after the band failed to secure the rights to release the song with Smith's vocals to U.S. radio from Shinedown's label, Atlantic Records. Accordingly, the promotional video for "Not Strong Enough" was re-released with Doug Robb replacing all scenes that were initially shot with Brent Smith.

The track "Bring Them to Light" was originally written for Worlds Collide, but both Joe Duplantier (of Gojira) and Apocalyptica were unhappy with the original, and so they decided to re-work the track, and re-record it for their next studio album.

== Track listing ==
All tracks produced by Joe Barresi, except for "Not Strong Enough" and "Broken Pieces" produced by Howard Benson.

Standard edition
No.	Title	Writer(s)	Length
1.	"At the Gates of Manala"	Perttu Kivilaakso, Paavo Lötjönen, Mikko Sirén, Eicca Toppinen	7:03
2.	"End of Me" (feat. Gavin Rossdale of Bush)	Johnny Andrews, Gavin Rossdale, Toppinen	3:29
3.	"Not Strong Enough" (feat. Brent Smith of Shinedown)	Diane Warren	3:36
4.	"2010" (feat. Dave Lombardo of Slayer)	Kivilaakso, Lombardo, Lötjönen, Sirén	4:32
5.	"Beautiful"	Kivilaakso	2:19
6.	"Broken Pieces" (feat. Lacey Sturm of Flyleaf)	Fiora Cutler, Guy Sigsworth, Toppinen	3:55
7.	"On the Rooftop with Quasimodo"	Sirén	5:00
8.	"Bring Them to Light" (feat. Joe Duplantier of Gojira)	Duplantier, Toppinen	4:42
9.	"Sacra^{[A]}"	Sirén, Toppinen	4:22
10.	"Rage of Poseidon"	Kivilaakso, Lötjönen, Sirén, Toppinen	8:49
11.	"Return Game" (bonus track when downloaded from Amazon)	Toppinen	4:16
Total length:			52:03

Notes

- A "Sacra" is partly inspired by Finnish folk song "Peltoniemen Hintriikan Surumarssi".

== Release ==
7th Symphony was released in six different formats.

=== Standard CD ===
Contains the standard 10-track album.

=== Vinyl LP ===
Contains the standard 10-track album.

=== Limited edition CD/DVD ===
Contains 12 songs (additional tracks being "Through Paris in A Sportscar" and "The Shadow of Venus") and a bonus DVD with filmed acoustic recordings from a session at the Sibelius Academy in Finland, recorded on June 4, 2010.

Deluxe edition bonus tracks
No.	Title	Writer(s)	Length
5.	"Through Paris in a Sportscar"	Sirén	3:52
12.	"The Shadow of Venus"	Kivilaakso, Toppinen	4:04

Bonus DVD "Acoustic at The Sibelius Academy" (live performance)
No.	Title	Length
1.	"Beautiful"	2:37
2.	"Not Strong Enough" (feat. Tipe Johnson of Leningrad Cowboys)	4:06
3.	"End of Me" (feat. Tipe Johnson)	3:25
4.	"I Don't Care" (feat. Tipe Johnson)	3:40
5.	"Sacra"	4:05
6.	"Bittersweet"	3:40

=== Digital download ===
Digital download versions include the standard 10-track edition and the limited 12-track edition of the album, with additional bonus tracks "Spiral Architect" or "Return Game". The iTunes bonus track "Spiral Architect" is a cover of Black Sabbath and was also featured in the free CD available with the September 2010 issue of Metal Hammer.

iTunes deluxe edition bonus track
No.	Title	Writer(s)	Length
13.	"Spiral Architect" (Black Sabbath cover from Sabbath Bloody Sabbath (1973))	Tony Iommi, Ozzy Osbourne, Geezer Butler, Bill Ward	3:16

=== USB stick ===
A cello-shaped USB stick with 10 songs, plus "Through Paris In A Sports Car " and "The Shadow Of Venus", as well as "End Of Me" video, On the Road with Apocalyptica tour film (Ukraine 2010) and digital booklet.

=== Limited red vinyl ===
Contains standard 10-track album. Released in Germany, Austria and Switzerland only.

== Reception ==
Professional ratings
Review scores
Source	Rating
Allmusic	3.5/5 stars
Rock Sound	7/10 stars
Type 3 Media	6/10 stars

Phil Freeman of Allmusic felt that 7th Symphony was a "string tribute" while Merlin Alderslade of Rock Sound said it was not a spectacular album in comparison to Apocalyptica's previous album Worlds Collide.

== Personnel ==
- Perttu Kivilaakso – cello, additional vocals
- Paavo Lötjönen – cello, additional vocals
- Mikko Sirén – drums, percussion, additional vocals; double bass on 'Beautiful' (live bonus DVD)
- Eicca Toppinen – cello, additional vocals
- Joe Barresi – producer, mixer
- Howard Benson – producer, keyboards and programming (on "Not Strong Enough" and "Broken Pieces")
- Chris Lord-Alge – mixer (on "Not Strong Enough")
- Johnny Andrews – additional vocals
- Lauri Porra of Stratovarius – bass
- Paul Bushnell – bass (on "Not Strong Enough" and "Broken Pieces")

Guest musicians

- Gavin Rossdale of Bush – vocals on "End of Me"
- Brent Smith of Shinedown – vocals on "Not Strong Enough (Album Version)"
- Doug Robb of Hoobastank – vocals on "Not Strong Enough (US Single Version)"
- Dave Lombardo of Slayer – drums on "2010"
- Lacey Mosley of Flyleaf – vocals on "Broken Pieces"
- Joe Duplantier of Gojira – vocals on "Bring Them to Light"

== Charts ==
Chart (2010)	Provider	Peak position	Certification	Sales/ shipments
Finnish Albums Chart	IFPI/YLE	2	-	-
German Albums Chart	IFPI/Media Control	6	-	-
Mexican Albums Chart	AMPROFON	15	-	-
Polish Albums Chart	OLiS/ZPAV	5	Gold	10.000
