= Reflections (Apocalyptica album) =

Studio album by Apocalyptica
- Released: 2 October 2003
- Genre: Gothic metal, symphonic metal, neo-classical metal, progressive metal, classical
- Length: 48:41
- Label: Universal

Apocalyptica chronology
Best of Apocalyptica (2002)	Reflections (2003)	Apocalyptica (2005)

Professional ratings
Review scores
Source	Rating
AllMusic	3.5/5 stars
Collector's Guide to Heavy Metal	8/10

Reflections is the fourth studio album of Finnish metal band Apocalyptica, released in 2003 with a special-edition entitled Reflections Revised released in the later part of 2003 containing a DVD as well as the original album with five bonus tracks. The original slipcase cover is a picture of a burning cello, which is also seen in the inside traycard of all versions. The cover resembles the photograph Le Violon d'Ingres by Man Ray.

It was the first release to have professional percussionists playing the drums. From this album on, the band needed to add a drummer to the band, later being Mikko Sirén.

"Toreador II" is a continuation of "Toreador" from Inquisition Symphony.

== Track listing ==
All tracks are written by Eicca Toppinen, except where noted

No.	Title	Writer(s)	Length
1.	"Prologue (Apprehension)"		3:12
2.	"No Education"		3:17
3.	"Faraway"		5:13
4.	"Somewhere Around Nothing"		4:09
5.	"Drive"		3:21
6.	"Čohkka"		4:27
7.	"Conclusion"	Perttu Kivilaakso	4:06
8.	"Resurrection"	Kivilaakso	3:34
9.	"Heat"		3:21
10.	"Cortége"		4:28
11.	"Pandemonium"	Kivilaakso	2:06
12.	"Toreador II"		3:56
13.	"Epilogue (Relief)"		3:29

Revised, Russian Edition & 2005 US Reissue
No.	Title	Length
14.	"Seemann (Rammstein Cover)" (feat. Nina Hagen)	4:43
15.	"Faraway, Vol. 2 (Extended Version)"	5:12

Revised & Russian Edition
No.	Title	Length
16.	"Delusion"	4:10
17.	"Perdition"	4:09
18.	"Leave Me Alone"	4:11

2005 US Reissue
No.	Title	Length
16.	"Deep Down Ascend (Demo)"	3:46
17.	"Kellot (Demo)"	4:17
18.	"Somewhere Around Nothing (Music video)"	3:46

Russian Edition
No.	Title	Length
19.	"Letting the Cables Sleep (Apocalyptica Remix) (Bush cover)"	4:03

=== DVD ===
1. "Faraway" Live 2003
2. "Enter Sandman" Live 2003
3. "Inquisition Symphony" Live 2003
4. "Nothing Else Matters" Live 2003
5. "Somewhere Around Nothing" Live 2003
6. "Somewhere Around Nothing" Video
7. "Faraway, Vol. 2" Video
8. "Seemann" Video
9. "Faraway, Vol. 2" EPK
10. "Reflections" EPK
11. "Seemann" EPK

== Personnel ==
=== Apocalyptica ===
- Eicca Toppinen – cello, songwriting, programming
- Perttu Kivilaakso – cello, songwriting
- Paavo Lötjönen – cello

=== Drummers ===
- Dave Lombardo – (1, 2, 4, 8 & 10)
- Sami Kuoppamäki – (3, 5–7, 9, 11–13 & 15–19)

=== Additional Various Musicians ===
- Juhani Lagerspetz – piano (3)
- Ville Väätäinen – double bass (6, 7, 8, 10, 13)
- Pasi Pirinen – trumpet (12)
- Linda Sundblad – vocals (15)

=== Additional Credits on "Seemann" ===
- Nina Hagen – vocals
- Michael Wolff – vocalpainting
- Mikko Raita – mixing and recording
- Teijo Jämsä – drums

=== Production ===
- Mika Jussila – mastered
- T-T Oksala – mixed, programming, recording

=== Violins ===
- Jaakko Kuusisto – solo (13)
- Jyrki Lasonpalo
- Kerim Gribajcevic
- Lotta Nykäsenoja

=== Additional Cellos (10) ===
- Antero Manninen
- Gregoire Korniluk

=== Album Inlay ===
- Dirk Rudolph – album design
- Mirjam Haberkorn – illustration
- Nina Parviainen – album cover model
- Aki Siik – styling
- Olaf Heine – photography

== Certifications ==
Region	Certification	Certified units/sales
Germany (BVMI)	Gold	100,000^{‡}
^{‡} Sales+streaming figures based on certification alone.
