= Cult (Apocalyptica album) =

Studio album by Apocalyptica
- Released: 2 October 2000
- Recorded: 1999 – 28 April 2000
- Studio: Petrax (Hollola); Horus Sound (Hannover) – vocals ("Path Vol. 2"); Woodhouse (Hagen) – vocals ("Hope Vol. 2")
- Genre: Cello metal; symphonic metal; neo-classical metal; progressive metal
- Length: 1:15:30 (both discs)
- Label: Mercury/Universal
- Producer: Kai "Hiili" Hiilesmaa

Apocalyptica chronology
Inquisition Symphony (1998)	Cult (2000)	The Best of Apocalyptica (2002)

Special Edition
- 2001's Special Edition alternate album cover

Cult is the third studio album by Finnish cello metal band Apocalyptica, released in 2000, with a special edition issued in 2001 that includes an extra disc, mixed and mastered at Finnvox. Apocalyptica's first two albums consisted mostly of cover songs. Cult was their first album to feature mainly original compositions, along with using distortion effects much more boldly and frequently, which gave the album a more orchestral sound. The record also experimented with vocals and other instrumentation. There are some versions of the first release with "Path Vol. 2" as the first track and "Path" as the fourteenth. This is the last Apocalyptica album to feature Max Lilja on cello. The song "Hope Vol. 2" has a music video that features scenes from the film Vidocq. Cult, along with Inquisition Symphony and Live, were bundled together in a limited edition collectors box set, issued in 2003.

== Track listing ==
All music is composed by Eicca Toppinen, except where noted.

No.	Title	Music	Length
1.	"Path"		3:08
2.	"Struggle"		3:26
3.	"Romance"		3:28
4.	"Pray!"		4:22
5.	"In Memoriam"		4:41
6.	"Hyperventilation"		4:28
7.	"Beyond Time"		3:57
8.	"Hope"		3:24
9.	"Kaamos"		4:42
10.	"Coma" (Live at Hollola Church)		6:59
11.	"Hall of the Mountain King" (Edvard Grieg cover, from Peer Gynt, Op. 23, Act II, Pt. 5)	Grieg	3:29
12.	"Until It Sleeps" (Metallica cover, from Load)	James Hetfield; Lars Ulrich	3:15
13.	"Fight Fire with Fire" (Metallica cover, from Ride the Lightning)	Hetfield; Ulrich; Cliff Burton	3:25
Total length:			52:48

Special Edition (Disc 2)
No.	Title	Music	Length
1.	"Path Vol. 2"		3:23
2.	"Hope Vol. 2"		4:02
3.	"Harmageddon (Live at Muffatwerk, Munich, on 24 October 2000, from Inquisition Symphony)"		4:57
4.	"Nothing Else Matters (Metallica cover, from Metallica)^{Note 1}"	Hetfield; Ulrich	5:15
5.	"Inquisition Symphony (Sepultura cover, from Schizophrenia)^{Note 1}"	Max Cavalera; Igor Cavalera; Andreas Kisser; Paulo Jr.	5:05
Total length:			22:42

=== Note ===
1. ^Note 1 Also Live at Muffatwerk, Munich, on 24 October 2000, and also from Inquisition Symphony

== Reception ==
Professional ratings
Review scores
Source	Rating
Allmusic	3/5 stars
Collector's Guide to Heavy Metal	5/10
PiercingMetal	7/10 stars

Chart	Peak position
Polish Albums Chart	31

== Credits ==
=== Apocalyptica ===
- Eicca Toppinen – cello, double bass, percussion, arrangements
- Max Lilja – cello
- Paavo Lötjönen – cello
- Perttu Kivilaakso – cello

=== Additional personnel ===
==== Path Vol.2 ====
- Sandra Nasić – vocals
- Clemens Matzenik – engineering at Horus

==== Hope Vol.2 ====
- Matthias Sayer – vocals
- Jeff Collier – lyrics

==== Other ====
- Kai "Hiili" Hiilesmaa – percussion
- Mika Jussila – mastering
- Niina Pasanen – styling
- Jyrki Tuovinen – engineering (10) and recording

==== Mixing ====
- Mikko Karmila – Disc 1
- T-T Oksala – Disc 2

==== Images ====
Cover art

- Eero Heikkinen
- Juri

Photographers

- Vertti Teräsvuori
- Olaf Heine
