= I'm Not Jesus =

Single by Apocalyptica featuring Corey Taylor

from the album Worlds Collide
- Released: September 17, 2007; March 4, 2008
- Recorded: 2007
- Genre: Symphonic metal; alternative metal
- Length: 3:36
- Label: Sony BMG
- Songwriters: Johnny Andrews; Geno Lenardo
- Producer: Jacob Hellner

Apocalyptica singles chronology
"Repressed" (2006)	"I'm Not Jesus" (2007)	"S.O.S. (Anything But Love)" (2008)

"I'm Not Jesus" is a song by the Finnish cello metal band Apocalyptica, featuring Corey Taylor from Slipknot and Stone Sour. The single was released on September 17, 2007, and again on March 4, 2008, on the album Worlds Collide.

The song thematizes child abuse by clerics. Corey Taylor sings from the perspective of a man who was sexually abused by a priest when he was a child and now confronts his abuser.

The song was co-written by ex-Filter guitarist and composer Geno Lenardo and vocalist Johnny Andrews.

== Music video ==
The music video, directed by Tony Petrossian, featured Corey Taylor recording, and Apocalyptica members playing their instruments. The video also includes various film shots of children in torn/old clothes, and behind fences or various other objects. Every child shows no emotion in their facial expression.

== Track listing ==
Basic edition

1. "I'm Not Jesus" featuring Corey Taylor – 3:35
2. "Worlds Collide" – 4:29

Premium edition

1. "I'm Not Jesus" featuring Corey Taylor – 3:36
2. "Worlds Collide" – 4:28
3. "S.O.S. (Anything But Love)" (instrumental) – 4:18
4. "Burn" – 4:18
5. "I'm Not Jesus" (video) featuring Corey Taylor – 3:36

7" single

1. "I'm Not Jesus" featuring Corey Taylor
2. SOS

Europe promo single

1. "I'm Not Jesus" (Explicit) featuring Corey Taylor
2. "I'm Not Jesus" (Clean) featuring Corey Taylor

US promo single

1. "I'm Not Jesus" (Clean) featuring Corey Taylor – 3:35
2. "I'm Not Jesus" (Explicit) featuring Corey Taylor – 3:35
3. "I'm Not Jesus" (video) featuring Corey Taylor

1-track promo #1

1. "I'm Not Jesus" featuring Corey Taylor – 3:34

1-track promo #2

1. "I'm Not Jesus" (Clean Vocal Normal Version) featuring Corey Taylor

== Personnel ==
- Corey Taylor – vocals
- Eicca Toppinen – rhythm cello
- Paavo Lötjönen – bass cello
- Perttu Kivilaakso – lead cello
- Mikko Sirén – drums
- Jacob Hellner – production

== Charts ==
=== Weekly charts ===
Weekly chart performance for "I'm Not Jesus"
Chart (2007–2008)	Peak position
Finland (Suomen virallinen lista)	15
Germany (GfK)	55
US Alternative Airplay (Billboard)	15
US Mainstream Rock (Billboard)	6

=== Year-end charts ===
Year-end chart performance for "I'm Not Jesus"
Chart (2008)	Position
US Mainstream Rock (Billboard)	22
