= Wagner Reloaded-Live in Leipzig =

Live album by Apocalyptica
- Released: 18 November 2013
- Recorded: 5 July 2013 at Leipzig Arena
- Genre: Cello rock, symphonic metal
- Length: 55:07 (standard edition)
- Label: BMG
- Producer: Alex Silva, Eicca Toppinen

Apocalyptica chronology
7th Symphony (2010)	Wagner Reloaded-Live in Leipzig (2013)	Shadowmaker (2015)

Wagner Reloaded-Live in Leipzig is the first live album and eleventh album overall by the Finnish cello metal band Apocalyptica. It was released on 15 November 2013 in Finland and 18 November 2013 elsewhere. It was released three years after their previous studio album 7th Symphony. The time period allowed the band to prepare for a special live event to celebrate the anniversary of Richard Wagner's 200th Birthday. On 5–6 July 2013 the Leipzig Arena witnessed the sold-out première of Wagner Reloaded. This was a joint venture between German choreographer Gregor Seyffert and Apocalyptica. The event witnessed a blend of dance performances, circus and theatre arts, audiovisual effects, and live music.

To remember this event a state-of-the-art Live CD of Wagner Reloaded was released featuring Apocalyptica and the MDR Symphony Orchestra. The music is influenced by the overall work of Wagner, but is written by Apocalyptica's Eicca Toppinen. It therefore represents an album of new Apocalyptica material that is entirely instrumental.

== Reception ==
Professional ratings
Review scores
Source	Rating
BackstageAxxess.com	favorable
Power of Metal.dk	75/100
New Noise	3/5 stars
Reflections of Darkness	10/10
Rock Revolt Magazine	5/5 stars
Yell!	4.5/5 stars

The album received generally favorable reviews.

== Track listing ==
All tracks written by Eicca Toppinen except where noted.

Standard edition
No.	Title	Writer(s)	Length
1.	"Signal"		1:42
2.	"Genesis"		1:47
3.	"Fight Against Monsters"		6:09
4.	"Stormy Wagner"		4:02
5.	"Flying Dutchman"	Eicca Toppinen and Sven Helbig	4:29
6.	"Lullaby"		2:57
7.	"Bubbles"		2:08
8.	"Path In Life"	Eicca Toppinen and Sven Helbig	4:09
9.	"Creation of Notes"		5:35
10.	"Running Love"		5:02
11.	"Birth Pain"		6:22
12.	"Ludwig - Wonderland"		6:39
13.	"Ludwig - Requiem"	Eicca Toppinen and Sven Helbig	2:06
14.	"Destruction"		3:05
Total length:			55:07

== Release ==
Wagner Reloaded was originally released in three different formats.

=== Standard CD ===
Contains the standard 14-track album.

=== Vinyl LP ===
Contains the standard 14-track album on double gate-fold album.

=== Digital Album ===
Contains the standard 14-track album and video of "Stormy Wagner".

== Credits ==
=== Apocalyptica ===
- Eicca Toppinen – cello, composer, producer
- Perttu Kivilaakso – cello
- Paavo Lötjönen – cello
- Mikko Sirén – drums, percussion

=== Other personnel ===
- MDR Symphony Orchestra
- Sven Helbig – composer, orchestral arrangements
- Alex Silva – producer, engineer
- Klaus Mücke – engineer
- Markku Ollikainen – recording assistant
- David Hefti – Pro-Tools
- Tim Tautorat – editing
- Michael Ilbert – mixing
- Svante Forsbäck – mastering
