= Kirsi Ylijoki =

Finnish actress and singer (born 1969)

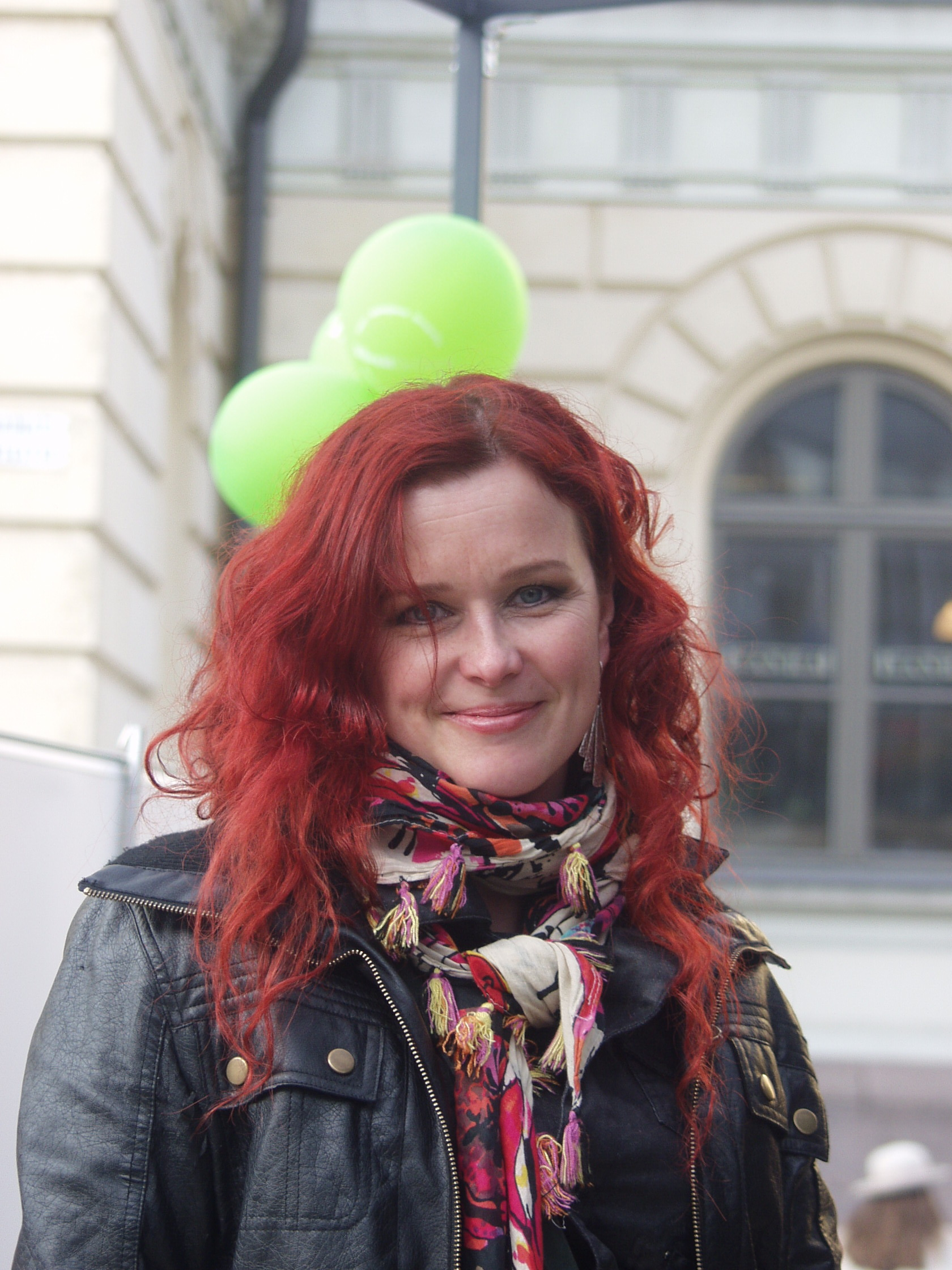
- Born: Kirsi Marja Ylijoki; 29 June 1969 (age 57); Finland
- Occupations: Actress, singer
- Spouse: Eicca Toppinen (m. 1997)

Kirsi Marja Ylijoki (born 29 June 1969) is a Finnish actress and singer who first achieved fame for her role in the Finnish Soap Opera Sydän toivoa täynnä. Several TV roles followed.

In recent years she has held back her own career to raise her children with Apocalyptica's Eicca Toppinen, but she remains popular with Finnish audiences.

Ylijoki and Toppinen married in 1997, and have two sons; one born in 1999, the other 2002.

She and Toppinen are members of the rock band Cherry & the Vipers; Kirsi is the singer and Toppinen plays the drums.

== Filmography ==
Year	Movie	Role	Other notes
1996	Sydän toivoa täynnä	Milla	First professional role, TV Series, stayed until she got pregnant in 1998
2002	Kymmenen riivinrautaa	Tuula Virtanen	
2004	Milja	the mother	Got into the movie because her husband was involved for the soundtrack
2006	Kotikatu	Nella Kvist	A single episode of the series
2023	Comeback		
2023	66th North Precinct	Terhi Ylijoki	6 episodes of the series
