= Sibelius Academy =

Music university in Helsinki, Finland

Sibelius Academy of the University of the Arts Helsinki
- Taideyliopiston Sibelius-Akatemia; Konstuniversitetets Sibelius-Akademi
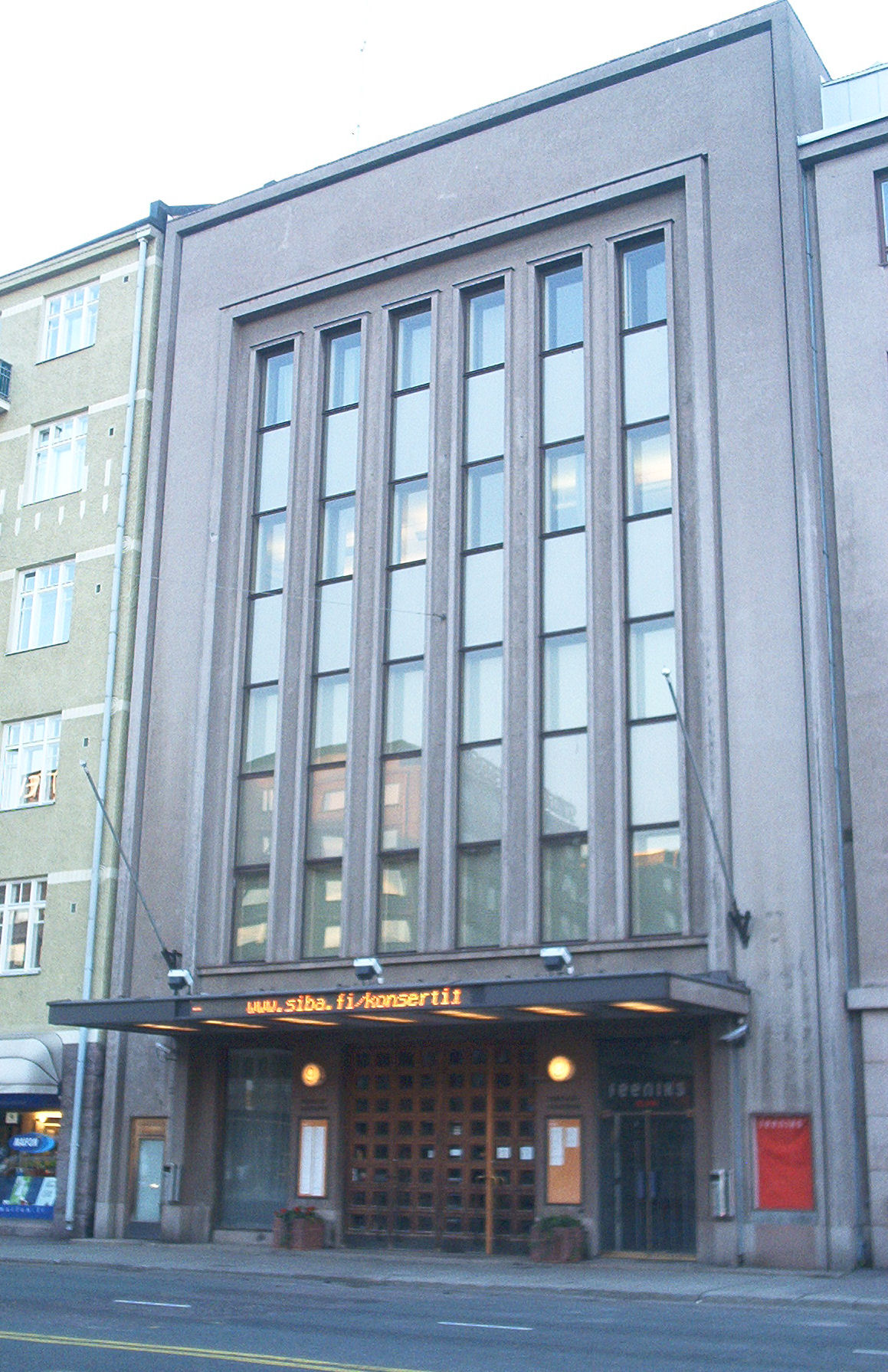
- Sibelius Academy in central Helsinki
- Type: Public
- Established: 1882
- Parent institution: University of the Arts Helsinki
- Dean: Emilie Gardberg
- Faculty: 126 full-time academic staff; 48 part-time academic staff; 434 hourly paid teachers
- Students: 1,400
- Undergraduates: 500
- Postgraduates: 640
- Doctoral students: 140
- Other students: 100 students at the Sibelius Junior Academy
- Location: Helsinki, Finland; 60°10′18″N 024°55′57″E
- Campus: In the heart of Helsinki
- Nickname: SibA
- Website: www.uniarts.fi/en/units/sibelius-academy/

The Sibelius Academy (Finnish: Taideyliopiston Sibelius-Akatemia, Swedish: Sibelius-Akademin vid Konstuniversitetet) is part of the University of the Arts Helsinki and a university-level music school which operates in Helsinki and Kuopio, Finland. It also has premises in Järvenpää and a unit in Seinäjoki. The Academy is the only music university in Finland. It is among the biggest European music universities with roughly 1,400 enrolled students.

The Sibelius Academy is the organizer of the International Maj Lind Piano Competition and one of the organizers of the International Jean Sibelius Violin Competition held every five years in Helsinki.

== History ==
The academy was founded in 1882 by Martin Wegelius as Helsingfors musikinstitut ("Helsinki Music Institute") and renamed Sibelius-Akatemia in 1939 to honour its own former student and Finland's most celebrated composer Jean Sibelius. In 2013, the academy merged with two formerly independent universities, Helsinki Theatre Academy and Academy of Fine Arts, Helsinki, to form the University of the Arts Helsinki.

Between 2015 and 2017 the Parliament of Finland met at the Academy while its building was undergoing renovation.

== Degrees ==
The primary degree at the Sibelius Academy is the Master of Music (MMus) degree. The school also offers postgraduate degrees with artistic and research options. The postgraduate degrees are the Licentiate of Arts in Music Lic.A. (Mus.) and the doctoral degree of Doctor of Arts in Music D.A. (Mus.)

== Degree programmes ==
The Academy offers the following degree programmes:

- Degree Programme in Church Music
- Degree Programme in Composition and Music Theory
- Degree Programme in Folk Music
- Degree Programme in Global Music
- Degree Programme in Jazz Music
- Degree Programme in Orchestral, Wind Orchestra and Choir Conducting
- Degree Programme in Music Education
- Degree Programme in Music Technology
- Degree Programme in Music Performance
- Degree Programme in Music Business
- Degree Programme in Vocal Music
- Degree Programme in Arts Management
- Degree Programme in Music Theatre (joint programme with the Theatre Academy)

== Notable students and faculty (past and present) ==
=== Composers ===
- Greta Dahlström, music teacher and composer
- Kalevi Aho
- Erik Bergman
- Paavo Heininen, former professor of composition
- Tuomas Kantelinen
- Pekka Kostiainen, composer and choral conductor
- Magnus Lindberg
- Jaakko Mäntyjärvi
- Erkki Melartin, student/composer/professor/Director Helsinki Conservatory
- Veli-Matti Puumala, professor of composition
- Einojuhani Rautavaara
- Kaija Saariaho
- Aulis Sallinen
- Jean Sibelius

=== Conductors ===
- Leo Funtek (1885–1965), violinist, conductor, arranger and music professor
- Paavo Berglund, conductor
- Pietari Inkinen, violinist, and conductor
- Sasha Mäkilä, assistant conductor of The Cleveland Orchestra
- Eva Ollikainen, conductor of the Iceland Symphony Orchestra
- Sakari Oramo, conductor of the BBC Symphony Orchestra
- Jorma Panula, conductor, composer and teacher
- Atso Almila, conductor, composer and teacher
- Esa-Pekka Salonen, conductor of the Philharmonia Orchestra, former conductor of the LA Philharmonic, composer
- Jukka-Pekka Saraste, former conductor of the Toronto Symphony Orchestra
- David Searle, orchestral conductor of The Catholic University of America Symphony Orchestra
- Leif Segerstam, conductor of the Turku Philharmonic Orchestra
- Ulf Söderblom, Principal Conductor of the Finnish National Opera (1973–1993), taught at the Sibelius Academy and conducted its orchestras from 1965 to 1968
- Heidi Sundblad-Halme, founder and conductor of the Helsinki Women’s Orchestra; composer
- Okko Kamu, conductor of the Lahti Symphony Orchestra
- Osmo Vänskä, music director of the Minnesota Orchestra
- Mikko Franck, conductor of the Orchestre philharmonique de Radio France
- Susanna Mälkki, conductor of the Helsinki Philharmonic Orchestra
- Hannu Lintu, conductor of the Finnish Radio Symphony Orchestra
- Klaus Mäkelä, conductor of the Orchestre de Paris
- Dima Slobodeniouk, conductor of the Orquesta Sinfonica de Galicia
- Santtu-Matias Rouvali, conductor of the Tampere Philharmonic Orchestra, the Gothenburg Symphony Orchestra, and the Philharmonia Orchestra
- Dalia Stasevska, conductor of the Lahti Symphony Orchestra
- Tarmo Peltokoski, conductor of the Orchestre national du Capitole de Toulouse and Latvian National Symphony Orchestra
- James S. Kahane, Music Director of the Hamilton Philharmonic Orchestra

=== Instrumentalists ===
- Juhani Aaltonen, Finnish jazz saxophonist and flautist
- Linda Brava, violinist
- France Ellegaard (1913–1999), pianist and faculty member
- Gerard Le Feuvre, cellist and founder of the Kings Chamber Orchestra
- Simon Ghraichy (1985), pianist
- Tuija Hakkila (1959), pianist
- Anja Ignatius (1911–1995), violinist and professor
- Perttu Kivilaakso, cellist in the band Apocalyptica, former Helsinki Philharmonic Orchestra
- Kalevi Kiviniemi (1958–2024), organist
- Kari Kriikku, clarinetist
- Matias Kupiainen, lead guitarist of the band Stratovarius
- Pekka Kuusisto, violinist
- Risto Lauriala, pianist
- Max Lilja, cellist in the band Hevein and founding member of Apocalyptica
- Hui-Ying Liu-Tawaststjerna, pianist
- Paavo Lötjönen, cellist in the band Apocalyptica
- Antero Manninen, former cellist in the band Apocalyptica and cellist in the Helsinki Philharmonic Orchestra
- Olli Mustonen, pianist and composer
- Arto Noras, cellist, student of Paul Tortelier
- Mikko Paananen, known as Mige, bassist of the band HIM
- Martti Pokela, founder of the folk music department and former professor of the kantele
- Aku Raski aka Huoratron, electro house and chiptune musician
- Astrid Riska, organist
- Martti Rousi, cello teacher
- Kaija Saarikettu, Professor of solo strings and chamber music
- Antti Siirala, winner of the Dublin, Leeds, and Beethoven international piano competitions
- Eicca Toppinen, cellist in the band Apocalyptica
- Agnes Tschetschulin, violinist, composer, one of the first four graduates
- Elina Vähälä, violinist

=== Vocalists ===
- Anneli Aarika-Szrok, contralto
- Venla Ilona Blom, beatboxer and singer
- Kim Borg, bass
- Monica Groop, mezzo-soprano
- Tommi Hakala, baritone, winner of the 2003 Cardiff Singer of the World Competition
- Jorma Hynninen, baritone
- Soile Isokoski, soprano
- Pille Lill, soprano
- Topi Lehtipuu, tenor
- Peter Lindroos, tenor (was both a student and teacher at the academy)
- Karita Mattila, soprano, winner of the 1983 Cardiff Singer of the World Competition
- Jyrki Niskanen, tenor
- Arja Saijonmaa, singer
- Petteri Salomaa, bass-baritone
- Tuuli Takala, soprano
- Tarja Turunen, soprano, former singer of the symphonic metal band Nightwish
- Soila Sariola, singer of the double platinum awarded and multiple gold winning vocal ensemble Rajaton
- Matti Salminen, bass
- Paula Vesala, singer of PMMP
- Martti Wallén, opera singer

== Junior Academy ==
Junior Academy is for highly skilled young musicians to study with top level professionals before entering a university.
