= Grace (Apocalyptica song) =

Song by Apocalyptica featuring Tomoyasu Hotei

from the album Worlds Collide
- Released: September 14, 2007
- Genre: Cello metal
- Length: 4:09
- Label: 20-20 Ent; Jive Records; Zomba Label Group; Sony BMG
- Songwriters: Mikko Sirén, Tomoyasu Hotei

"Grace" is a song by the Finnish cello metal band Apocalyptica, featuring Tomoyasu Hotei on guitar.

The song is featured in NHL 09 video game.

== Music video ==
The video, directed by Igor Burloff, starts in the sky with a strange winged airship coming towards the camera. Inside the airship, plasticine versions of Apocalyptica and Tomoyasu Hotei are playing dice when suddenly the reactor overloads, shooting about gears as the ship crashes. Following an explosion, Hotei encounters a strange cello-like skull being from which he retrieves a guitar. In downtown Tokyo, Hotei and a recently found Eicca fight ninjas and then warp to a ruined Paris in which they meet Paavo. They fight a gigantic spider and warp further to New York City where the Statue of Liberty, with its torch putting the city on fire, has come alive. Paavo drags one of its sandals off which hurls into the air and crashes into the cabriolet that Perttu is driving, casting him into the warp. They continue to the Arctic where they once again encounter a strange being along with finding Mikko. They get their instruments back and return to the ship. Out of the ice, the airship rises into the air once again as the band and Hotei play atop. The video ends showing the Statue of Liberty waving the airship off.
