= Inquisition Symphony (album) =

Studio album by Apocalyptica
- Released: September 22, 1998
- Recorded: 1998
- Genre: Classical, chamber music
- Length: 46:52
- Label: Mercury/PolyGram
- Producer: Otto Donner; Hiili Hiilesmaa

Apocalyptica chronology
| Plays Metallica by Four Cellos (1996) | Inquisition Symphony (1998) | Cult (2000) |

Singles from Inquisition Symphony
- 1. "Nothing Else Matters (Promo Only)" Released: 1998; 2. "Harmageddon" Released: 1998

Professional ratings
Review scores
| Source | Rating |
|---|---|
| Allmusic | 3/5 stars |
| Sputnikmusic | 4.5/5 stars |
| Terrorizer | 4/5 stars |

Inquisition Symphony is the second studio album by the Finnish metal band Apocalyptica. The album branches from their previous effort, containing only four Metallica covers. The remainder of the compositions are by Faith No More, Pantera, and Sepultura, as well as three originals by Apocalyptica bandleader Eicca Toppinen. In this album, some songs add percussive beats on the cellos. Max Lilja did the arrangements for "One". A sequel to "Toreador" appeared on the album Reflections.

== Track listing ==
All arrangements by Eicca Toppinen, except for "One" by Max Lilja

| No. | Title | Writer(s) | Length |
|---|---|---|---|
| 1. | "Harmageddon" | Toppinen | 4:56 |
| 2. | "From Out of Nowhere" (Faith No More cover, from The Real Thing) | Bill Gould, Roddy Bottum | 3:11 |
| 3. | "For Whom the Bell Tolls" (Metallica cover, from Ride the Lightning) | James Hetfield, Lars Ulrich, Kirk Hammett | 3:11 |
| 4. | "Nothing Else Matters" (Metallica cover, from self-titled) | Hetfield, Ulrich | 4:46 |
| 5. | "Refuse/Resist" (Sepultura cover, from Chaos A.D.) | Max Cavalera, Igor Cavalera, Paulo Jr., Andreas Kisser | 3:13 |
| 6. | "M.B." | Toppinen | 3:59 |
| 7. | "Inquisition Symphony" (Sepultura cover, from Schizophrenia) | Max & Igor Cavalera, Paulo Jr., Kisser | 4:57 |
| 8. | "Fade to Black" (Metallica cover, from Ride the Lightning) | Cliff Burton, Hetfield, Ulrich, Hammett | 5:01 |
| 9. | "Domination" (Pantera cover, from Cowboys from Hell) | Phil Anselmo, Dimebag Darrell, Rex Brown, Vinnie Paul | 3:31 |
| 10. | "Toreador" | Toppinen | 4:22 |
| 11. | "One" (Metallica cover, from ...And Justice for All) | Hetfield, Ulrich | 5:45 |

- The Japanese edition includes two bonus tracks: "Enter Sandman (Live)" and "The Unforgiven (Live)"

== Personnel ==
=== Apocalyptica ===
- Eicca Toppinen – cello, arrangement, composer
- Paavo Lötjönen – cello
- Antero Manninen – cello
- Max Lilja – cello, arrangement
