= Inquisition Symphony =

Inquisition Symphony may refer to:

- Inquisition Symphony (album), by Apocalyptica
- "Inquisition Symphony", by Sepultura from Schizophrenia
