= I Don't Care (Apocalyptica song) =

Single by Apocalyptica featuring Adam Gontier

from the album Worlds Collide
- Released: May 30, 2008 (US); September 5, 2008 (Germany)
- Recorded: 2007
- Genre: Alternative metal; post-grunge; pop rock; cello metal
- Length: 3:57 (album version); 3:41 (single and US album version)
- Label: Jive
- Songwriters: Eicca Toppinen; Adam Gontier; Max Martin
- Producer: Howard Benson

Apocalyptica singles chronology
"S.O.S. (Anything But Love)" (2008)	"I Don't Care" (2008)	"End of Me" (2010)

Music video
- "I Don't Care" on YouTube

"I Don't Care" is a song by Finnish rock band Apocalyptica, the song was released in 2008 as the third and final single from their sixth album Worlds Collide and features Adam Gontier, lead singer of Three Days Grace, on lead vocals. The song reached number one on the Billboard Mainstream Rock Tracks chart for one week and number two on the Alternative Songs chart where it spent a year in the top 20.

== Background and composition ==
Eicca Toppinen spoke about the song in an interview for Dutch metal webzine Zwaremetalen in 2007: "I wrote some of the lyrics to "I Don't Care." Max Martin wrote most of the lyrics, though. The song is about a fantasy and not about anyone in particular, but I think everyone can find a sense of truth in the lyrics."

== Versions ==
There are two recorded versions of the song. The first one (length 3:57) was released in 2007 in Europe. Adam Gontier wanted to re-record the song for the US and Canada release of "Worlds Collide" in 2008 and that version is 3:41. In this radio edit version of the song, some explicit content of the lyrics, including the chorus's second half, are replaced. The radio edit version is available only on the single and the US and Canadian edition of the album. In a February 2008 interview for Brave Words and Bloody Knuckles magazine Eicca Toppinen from Apocalyptica explains why there are two versions of the song: "Actually we've reworked the song. Adam [Gontier] originally recorded his vocals in the spring [of 2007] with our producer (Jacob Hellner), but Adam wasn't entirely happy with the result. So a couple of weeks ago, Adam went to the studio with [Three Days Grace producer] Howard Benson to record a new version of the song. It's really great. It will actually be on the US/Canadian edition."

== Music video ==
Speaking on the concept of the video, Eicca Topinnen said "It's going to be a bit freaky". "It'll be surrealistic in many ways, maybe a little bit in the spirit of Tim Burton. There's acrobats, strange-looking people doing strange things. It's going to be shot in an old house where nobody lives; it's a big mansion. It's really spooky. Of course, the director, Lisa Mann, is the only person who really knows at the moment, but it's exciting for us. She really wants to bring out the people inside the band. It feels completely different. It has a really special look."

The video shows the band playing in a decrepit house. The band plays in a small room with a low ceiling (Adam Gontier has to hunch over in order to stand). Next, the video shows members from the band and other women entering in and out of little doors. In the next scene, it shows the band, Gontier, and more women in a hallway standing still, dancing, walking and playing. Then, three women enter. In this dance sequence, the women dance around the three cello players, trying to seduce them, but they pay no attention. In a cutaway, it shows the three men playing. Cut back, and the three women sit in their laps. Then it shows the men playing the women like cellos. The following scene shows Gontier, rejecting a woman as she attempts to dance with him. In a cutaway scene continuing from the dance sequence, the women take their cellos away. In the last scene, it shows everybody in a room surrounding a table, eating, drinking, laughing, talking, dancing, and kissing. In the end, the band and Adam Gontier finished playing and a green light is shown shining behind them.

== Chart performance ==
"I Don't Care" debuted at number 92 on the Billboard Hot 100. The song peaked at number 78 on the chart and also reached number two on the Alternative Airplay chart. Additionally, the song topped the Mainstream Rock chart and remained on the chart for 40 weeks.

== In other media ==
The track was used in The CW's series Smallville in season eight, episode 16, called "Turbulence".

== Track listing ==
CD single – radio edit
No.	Title	Length
1.	"I Don't Care" (radio edit)	3:40

Digital download
No.	Title	Length
1.	"I Don't Care"	3:41

Maxi-CD
No.	Title	Length
1.	"I Don't Care" (US version)	3:43
2.	"Severe Area"	4:21

== Personnel ==
Credits for "I Don't Care" adapted from album's liner notes.

Apocalyptica

- Eicca Toppinen – rhythm cello
- Mikko Sirén – drums

Additional musicians

- Adam Gontier – vocals, featured artist
- Paul Bushnell – bass
- Phil X – guitar
- Mats Levén – backing vocals
- Howard Benson – keyboards, programming, Hammond B3, Korg Trinity, piano, electric piano, Fender Rhodes, farfisa, sequencing

Production

- Ted Jensen – mastering
- Rich Costey – mixing
- Paul Decarli – digital editing
- Hatsukazu Inagaki – engineering
- Mike Plotnikoff – recording
- Marc Vangool – guitar technician

== Charts ==
=== Weekly charts ===
Weekly chart performance for "I Don't Care"
Chart (2008–2009)	Peak position
Canada Hot 100 (Billboard)	59
Canada Rock (Billboard)	4
Finland (Suomen virallinen lista)	13
US Billboard Hot 100	78
US Hot Rock & Alternative Songs (Billboard)	14

=== Year-end charts ===
2008 year-end chart performance for "I Don't Care"
Chart (2008)	Position
US Alternative Airplay (Billboard)	26
US Mainstream Rock (Billboard)	18

2009 year-end chart performance for "I Don't Care"
Chart (2009)	Position
US Hot Rock & Alternative Songs (Billboard)	6

== Certifications ==
Certifications for "I Don't Care"
Region	Certification	Certified units/sales
Canada (Music Canada)	Gold	40,000^{‡}
United States (RIAA)	2× Platinum	2,000,000^{‡}
^{‡} Sales+streaming figures based on certification alone.

== Release history ==
Release dates and formats for "I Don't Care"
Region	Date	Format	Label	Ref.
Various	May 30, 2008	Digital download	Harmageddon	
United States	July 1, 2008	Alternative radio	Jive	
United States	July 1, 2008	Mainstream rock	Jive	
Germany	September 5, 2008	CD	Zomba	
