= Plays Metallica by Four Cellos =

Studio album by Apocalyptica
- Released: May 10, 1996
- Genre: Classical, chamber music, cello rock, symphonic metal
- Length: 44:31
- Label: Mercury/PolyGram

Apocalyptica chronology
Plays Metallica by Four Cellos (1996)	Inquisition Symphony (1998)

Professional ratings
Review scores
Source	Rating
Allmusic	3/5 stars

Plays Metallica by Four Cellos is the debut album by Finnish metal band Apocalyptica, released in 1996. It features eight instrumental Metallica covers arranged and played on cellos.

The band was invited to record this album by a label employee after a 1995 show in which they performed some of the songs. The members were initially unsure and thought nobody would listen to such a record, but the employee insisted and they recorded it. On 22 July 2016, a remastered version of the album was released with new bonus tracks. In 2017 to 2019, the band returned as a cello quartet for the first time since 2009 to perform all of the Metallica tracks they have covered at the time to celebrate their 20th anniversary of the debut album and in late 2018, a live recording of the tour was released in CD, vinyl, and a DVD with live footage entitled Plays Metallica by Four Cellos - A Live Performance. A follow-up album entitled Plays Metallica, Vol. 2, was released on June 7, 2024.

== Track listing ==
Original 1996 release
No.	Title	Writer(s)	Original Metallica album	Length
1.	"Enter Sandman"	James Hetfield; Lars Ulrich; Kirk Hammett	from Metallica	3:41
2.	"Master of Puppets"	Hetfield; Ulrich; Cliff Burton; Hammett	from Master of Puppets	7:17
3.	"Harvester of Sorrow"	Hetfield; Ulrich	from ...And Justice for All	6:15
4.	"The Unforgiven"	Hetfield; Ulrich; Hammett	from Metallica	5:23
5.	"Sad but True"	Hetfield; Ulrich	from Metallica	4:48
6.	"Creeping Death"	Hetfield; Ulrich; Burton; Hammett	from Ride the Lightning	5:08
7.	"Wherever I May Roam"	Hetfield; Ulrich	from Metallica	6:09
8.	"Welcome Home (Sanitarium)"	Hetfield; Ulrich; Hammett	from Master of Puppets	5:50

2016 remastered bonus tracks
No.	Title	Writer(s)	Original Metallica album	Length
9.	"Battery"	Hetfield; Ulrich	from Master of Puppets	4:32
10.	"Nothing Else Matters" (2016 Version)	Hetfield; Ulrich	from Metallica	4:49
11.	"Seek & Destroy"	Hetfield; Ulrich	from Kill 'Em All	4:24

== Personnel ==
Personnel taken from Plays Metallica by Four Cellos CD booklet.

Apocalyptica

- Max Lilja – cello
- Antero Manninen – cello
- Paavo Lötjönen – cello
- Eicca Toppinen – cello

Technical personnel

- Pekka Ritualuoto – production
- Eicca Toppinen – production assistant
- Sari Väkelä – sleeve design
- Juha Laine – sleeve design, photography

== Certifications ==
Certifications for Plays Metallica by Four Cellos
Region	Certification	Certified units/sales
Finland (Musiikkituottajat)	Platinum	23,303
Germany (BVMI)	Gold	250,000^{^}
Poland (ZPAV)	Gold	50,000^{*}
^{*} Sales figures based on certification alone.^{^} Shipments figures based on certification alone.
