= Thomastik-Infeld =

Austrian company

- Founded: 1919; 107 years ago
- Founders: Dr. Franz Thomastik; Otto Infeld
- Headquarters: Vienna, Austria
- Website: thomastik-infeld.com

Thomastik-Infeld Gmbh is an Austrian company based in Vienna that develops and produces strings and rosins for bowed and fretted string instruments, including the violin, viola, cello, contrabass, guitar, and bass guitar. They also make strings for folk instruments from various countries such as the mandolin or erhu.

== History ==
In 1919, Dr. Franz Thomastik, a violin maker, and Otto Infeld, a civil engineer, founded a company to manufacture steel strings. Thomastik-Infeld's workshops were destroyed in World War Two.

In 1958, Thomastik-Infeld introduced the Spirocore line of spiral rope-core strings. Later in 1970, the company introduced its Dominant line of perlon strings, which successfully broke into a market then dominated by the conventional gut string.

The company was run by Peter Infeld from 1994 until his death on April 15, 2009, at 67 years old. The company is now run by Zdenka Infeld.

In 2021, the company launched the Dominant Pro line of strings, and in 2023, the DYNAMO line.

== List of String Brands ==
Violin string brands from the company include:

- Vision (Standard, Solo, Titanium Orchestra, and Titanium Solo)
- Spirocore
- Superflexible
- Infeld (Red and Blue)
- Präzision
- Alphayue
- Peter Infeld
- Evertone
- Rondo (Gold and Standard)
- TI
- Spirit!
- DYNAMO (Standard and Solo)

Many famous violinists, including Itzhak Perlman, Hilary Hahn, and Isaac Stern, have used Thomastik-Infeld strings.
