= Apocalyptica =

Finnish symphonic metal band

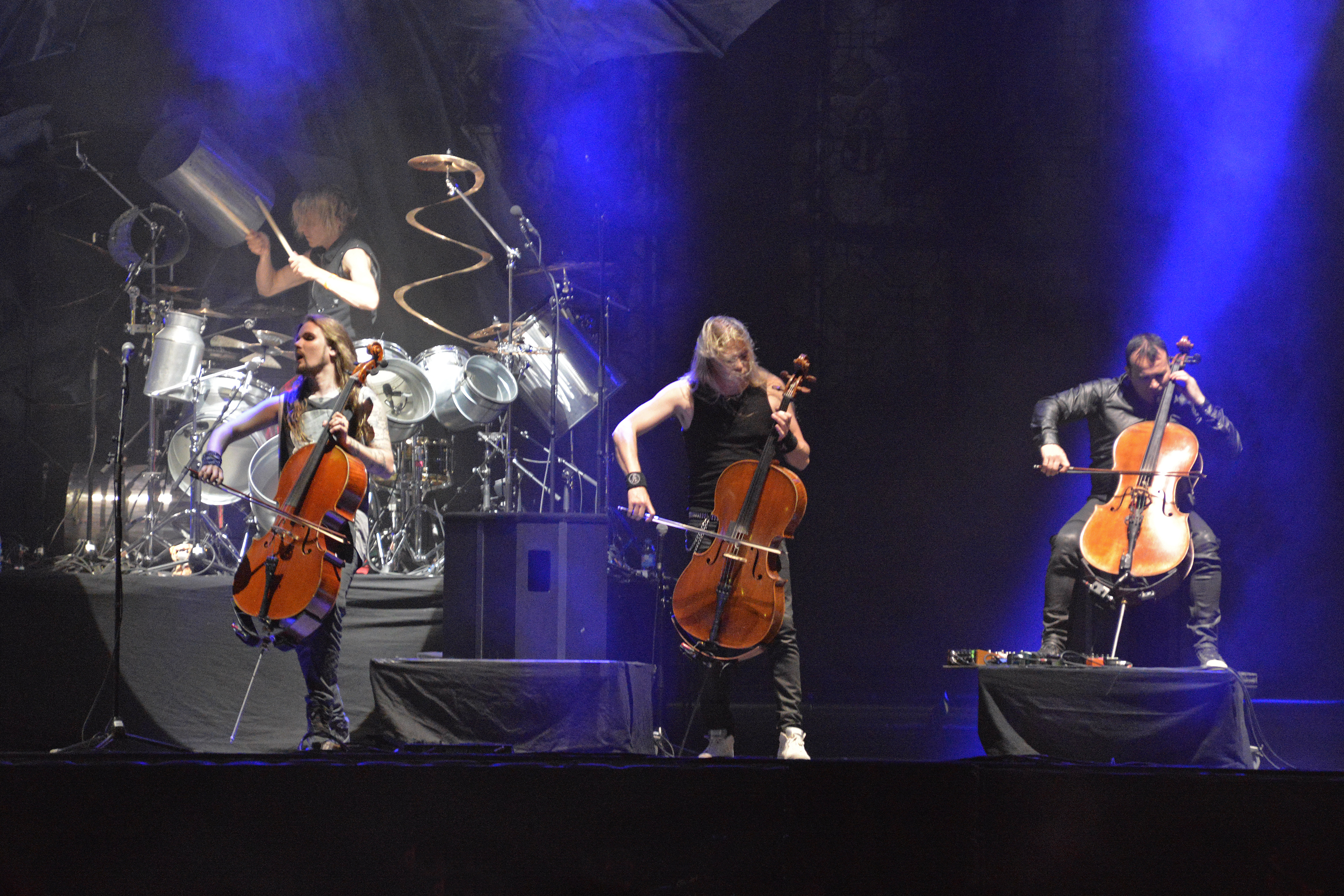
- Apocalyptica at Hellfest 2017

Background information
- Origin: Helsinki, Finland
- Genres: Symphonic metal; neoclassical metal; alternative metal; heavy metal
- Years active: 1993–present
- Labels: Eleven Seven; MCA; Zen Garden; Mercury; 20-20; Jive; Sony Music; RCA
- Members: Eicca Toppinen; Perttu Kivilaakso; Paavo Lötjönen
- Past members: Max Lilja; Antero Manninen; Mikko Sirén
- Website: apocalyptica.com

Apocalyptica is a Finnish symphonic metal band from Helsinki, formed in 1993. The band is currently composed of three classically trained cellists Eicca Toppinen, Paavo Lötjönen, and Perttu Kivilaakso. Originally a classical-style Metallica tribute band, the band eventually adopted a neoclassical metal style without the use of conventional guitars and bass. They have sold over four million albums to date.

== History ==
=== Founding ===
The band's logo

A cello quartet, Eicca Toppinen, Paavo Lötjönen, Max Lilja, and Antero Manninen formed Apocalyptica in 1993 at Sibelius Academy in Helsinki, Finland. The band released their debut studio album, Plays Metallica by Four Cellos, in 1996. The album consisted of only eight Metallica covers (mostly from Master of Puppets and their self-titled The Black Album). The band was featured on two songs on the Waltari album Space Avenue in 1997. Apocalyptica released their second studio album, Inquisition Symphony, produced by Hiili Hiilesmaa in 1998. Inquisition Symphony contained covers of Metallica and other metal bands such as Faith No More, Sepultura, and Pantera. It also contained three original songs by Eicca Toppinen.

=== 1999—2009 ===
Antero Manninen left the group in 1999 and was replaced by Perttu Kivilaakso. Perttu had previously performed with the band in 1995. Apocalyptica released their third studio album, Cult, in 2000. It featured mostly original songs and three cover songs. The album was Apocalyptica's first release featuring orchestral percussion performed by Toppinen, as well as the first to feature a track to include vocals, "Path Vol. 2", sung by Sandra Nasic of Guano Apes, was released shortly after Cult. Max Lilja left the group in 2002 and joined Hevein.

Apocalyptica released their fourth studio album, Reflections, in 2003, containing only original songs. Reflections featured an experimental sound different from the acoustic arrangements of Inquisition Symphony and Cult. Dave Lombardo from Slayer played drums on five songs from Reflections. Session drummer Sami Kuoppamäki covered the rest. When Lombardo declined the following tour, Apocalyptica hired Mikko Sirén, who would stay with the band for future tours as well as the recording of the next album.

Apocalyptica released their self-titled fifth studio album in 2005 which featured Ville Valo of HIM, Lauri Ylönen of the Rasmus, and Dave Lombardo, returning from the previous album.

Apocalyptica was on the track "Intro" from Bullet for My Valentine's album The Poison in 2005. The group performed with Marta Jandová and represented Baden-Württemberg in the Bundesvision Song Contest 2005 with the song "Wie weit", placing 5th with 77 points. Mikko Sirén became an official band member in December 2005 having played around 200 shows with the band.

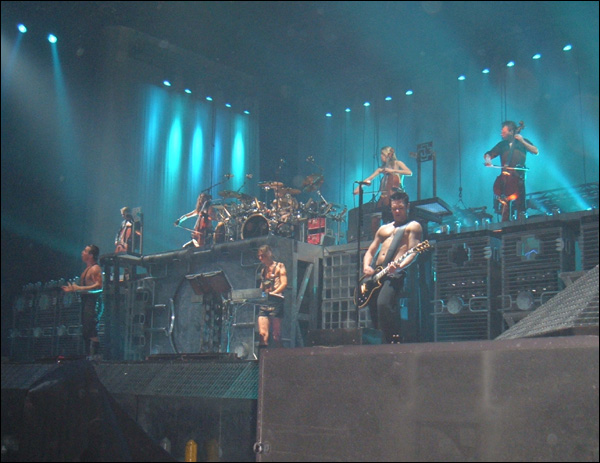
Apocalyptica performing with Rammstein in Milan in 2005

Apocalyptica released their sixth studio album, Worlds Collide, on 17 September 2007. It was produced by Jacob Hellner. To the surprise of many, the album includes a remake of the German version of David Bowie's song "Heroes". Till Lindemann of Rammstein, for whom they opened on the Reise, Reise tour, was the guest vocalist on the track "Helden". Worlds Collide was released on 15 April 2008 in the United States. The first single, "I'm Not Jesus" featuring Corey Taylor of Slipknot and Stone Sour, cracked the top 10 of both the Active rock and Alternative rock charts.

To end 2007, the band toured Europe, continuing in 2008 in the United States and included numerous festivals in Europe.

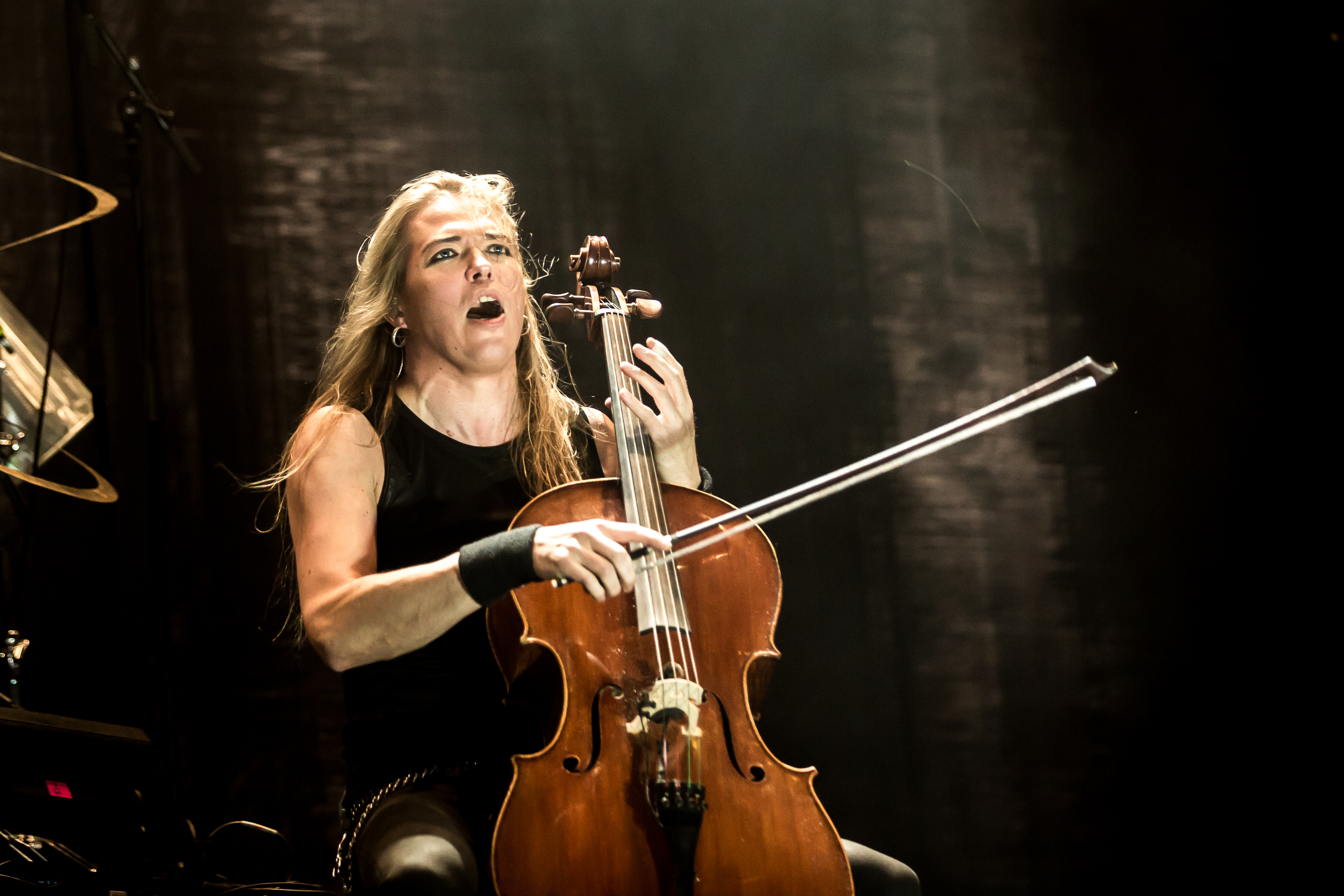
Eicca Toppinen performing at With Full Force 2018

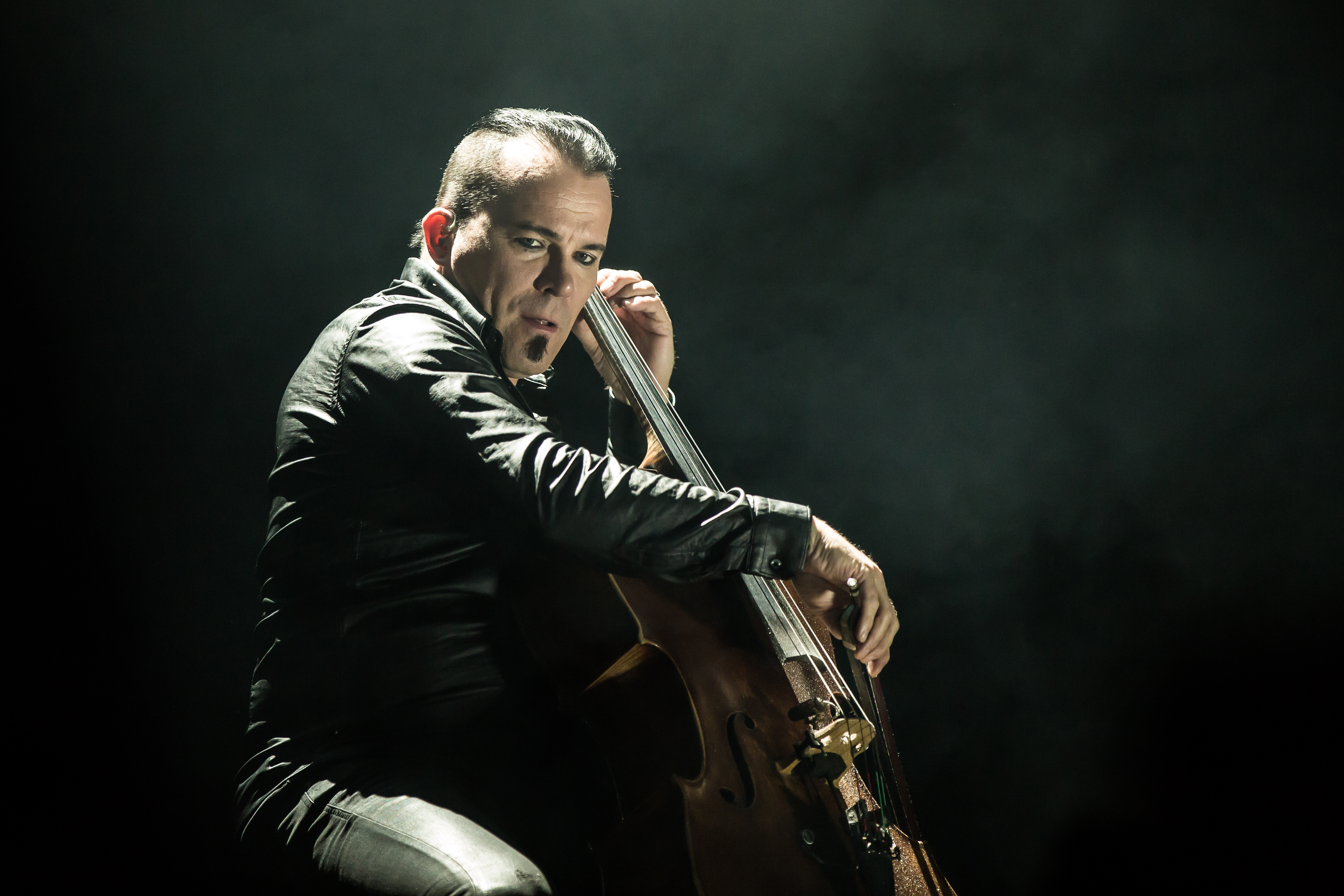
Paavo Lötjönen performing at With Full Force 2018

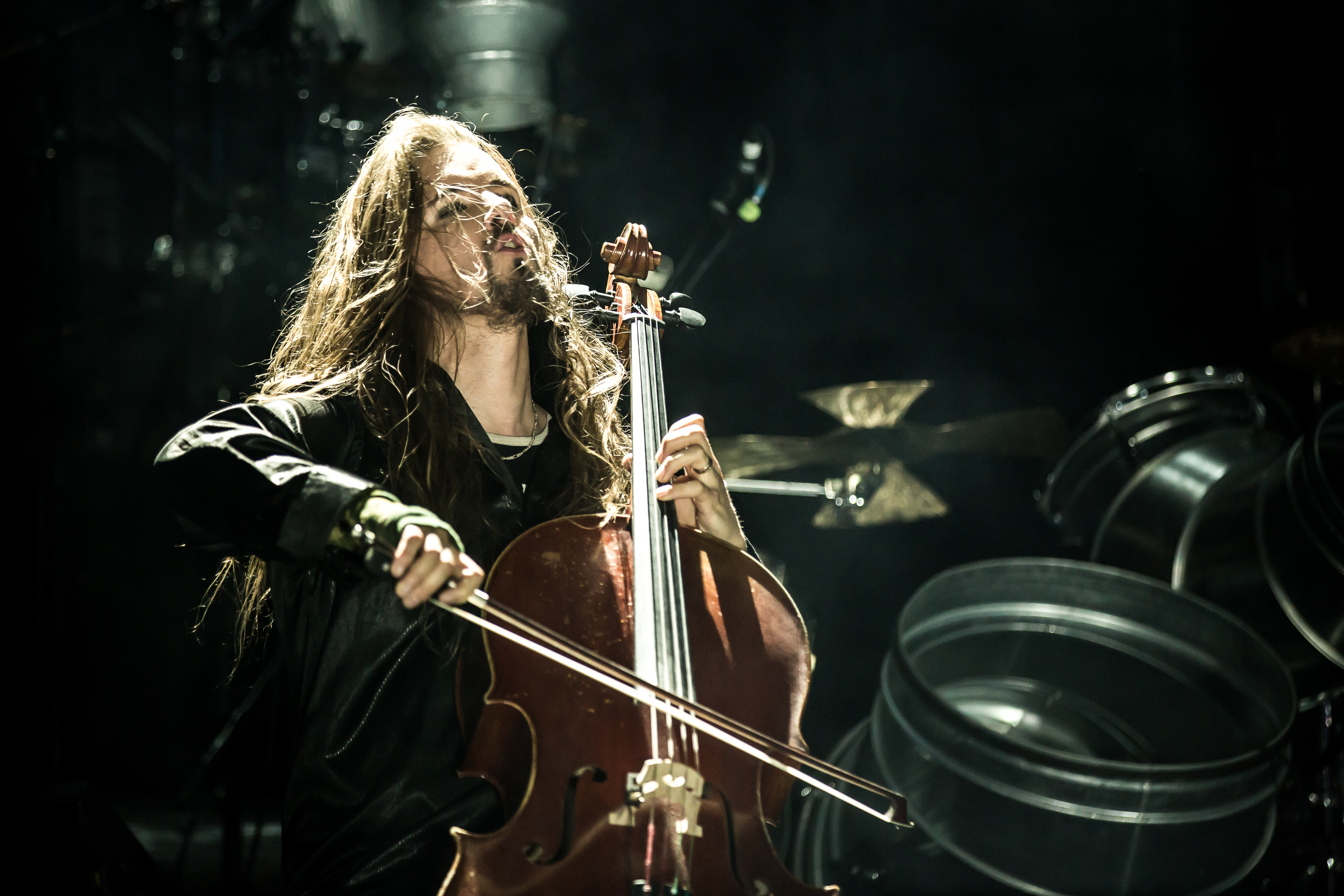
Perttu Kivilaakso performing at With Full Force 2018

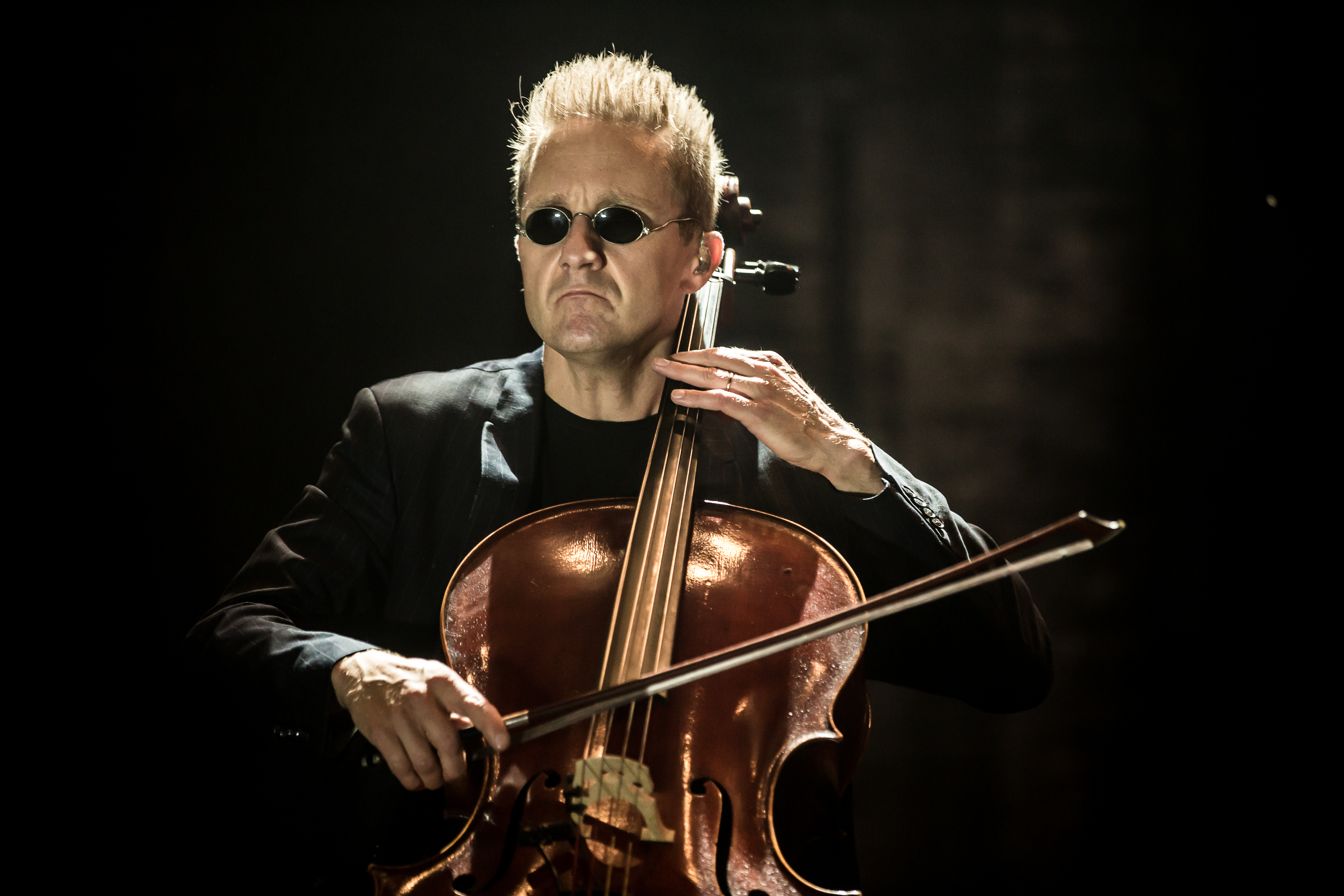
Antero Manninen performing at With Full Force 2018

In June 2008, during the Rock in Rio concert in Lisbon, Apocalyptica joined the Greenpeace "energy [r]evolution campaign" and played the Beethoven 5th symphony from the stage.

The band also appeared on Last Call with Carson Daly on 31 October 2008. Here they made their American television debut with a performance of "I Don't Care" with Toryn Green.

In November 2008, Apocalyptica featuring Adam Gontier of Three Days Grace hit first at the BDS and Mediabase Active Rock radio charts with the single "I Don't Care". Later that month, the band ranked 3rd on Billboard's Hot Modern Rock Track chart and 2nd on Billboard's Hot Mainstream Rock Tracks chart just after AC/DC and just ahead of Metallica, an ironic twist since the band's origins lie in performing Metallica covers. Recently, it reached No. 1 on the Billboard rock chart, making Apocalyptica the first Finnish band to top the US charts. The song "I Don't Care" was also featured in the 16th episode of Season 8 of the TV series Smallville, which aired on 19 March 2009.

=== 2010—2020 ===
On 26 January 2010, the video game MAG released. Apocalyptica produced the soundtrack for one of the main factions in the game, S.V.E.R.

The seventh Apocalyptica studio album entitled 7th Symphony, produced by Joe Barresi and Howard Benson, was released on 23 August 2010 in Europe (Germany on 20 August 2010), and 24 August in the U.S. The first single aired on radio 29 June 2010.

The album features eight instrumentals plus four tracks with guest vocals. The first single, "End of Me", features Gavin Rossdale, vocalist from the British alternative rock band Bush, who had previously collaborated with the band. Slayer drummer Dave Lombardo played on "2010." "Bring Them to Light" features Joseph Duplantier, singer and guitarist from the French death metal band Gojira. "Broken Pieces" is a collaboration with Flyleaf singer Lacey Mosley. "Not Strong Enough" was performed by Brent Smith, vocalist from (Shinedown). "Not Strong Enough" was re-recorded with Doug Robb of Hoobastank before being released to US radio on 18 January 2011 due to distribution rights.

On 7 October 2011, RCA Music Group announced it was disbanding Jive Records along with Arista Records and J Records. With the shutdown, the band (and all other artists previously signed to these three labels) will release their future material on the RCA Records brand.

Apocalyptica performed live with Metallica on three songs, "No Leaf Clover", "One" and "Seek & Destroy" in celebration of Metallica's 30th Anniversary on 5 December 2011.

The band released an exclusive pledgers-only song "Solo Tu" featuring Erik Canales of Allison via fan-funding website Pledgemusic, as part of their Apocalyptica photo book project on 28 October 2011.

Apocalyptica took a year off from touring and recording after concluding the 7th Symphony world tour in Beijing September 2012. During the break the band worked on a crossover musical and theatrical project titled Wagner Reloaded, combining Wagner's music with the sound of Apocalyptica, to celebrate German composer Richard Wagner's 200th birthday. There were two live performances in Wagner's birth town Leipzig, Germany on 5 and 6 July 2013. Eicca Toppinen arranged and composed the music for the production. The band released an album titled Wagner Reloaded-Live in Leipzig, in November 2013.

Apocalyptica released "Psalm" on 10 May 2013. It was performed by Perttu Kivilaakso on their most recent tour. The band also announced a tour with Finnish Avanti! Chamber Orchestra, which premiered in March 2014. The set consisted solely of instrumentally performed Apocalyptica songs, especially arranged for the band and the 25-piece orchestra.

Their eighth studio album, titled Shadowmaker, with Franky Perez singing on all vocal tracks, was released through Better Noise imprint of Eleven Seven Music on 17 April 2015. They also released a collaborative single with Vamps titled "Sin in Justice" on 20 November.

Apocalyptica made the music for the episode On Finn Ice of Rovio Entertainment's video game Angry Birds Seasons.

Apocalyptica celebrated their 20th anniversary of the first album Plays Metallica by Four Cellos in 2016 and it was re-released with 3 brand new bonus tracks.

In February 2019, the band released their first single with Finnish lyrics, featuring Sanni and Tippa. They performed the song at the 2019 Emma Gala in Helsinki.

The band's ninth studio album, an instrumental, Cell-0, was released on 10 January 2020.

=== 2020—present ===
Apocalyptica was on the track "Someone To Talk To" from Three Days Grace's album Explosions on 6 May 2022.

The band toured throughout the first half of 2023. On 15 December 2023, Apocalyptica released a new song and video called "What We're Up Against", featuring Elize Ryd of Amaranthe.

On 7 June 2024, the band released their tenth studio album, Plays Metallica, Vol. 2, a sequel to Plays Metallica by Four Cellos (1996). The album features new Metallica covers such as The Four Horsemen and The Unforgiven II, as well as a new recording of One with Metallica vocalist James Hetfield reciting the lyrics and bassist Robert Trujillo. It also includes a cover of The Call of Ktulu featuring the original bass master track recorded by Cliff Burton in 1984.

== Band members ==
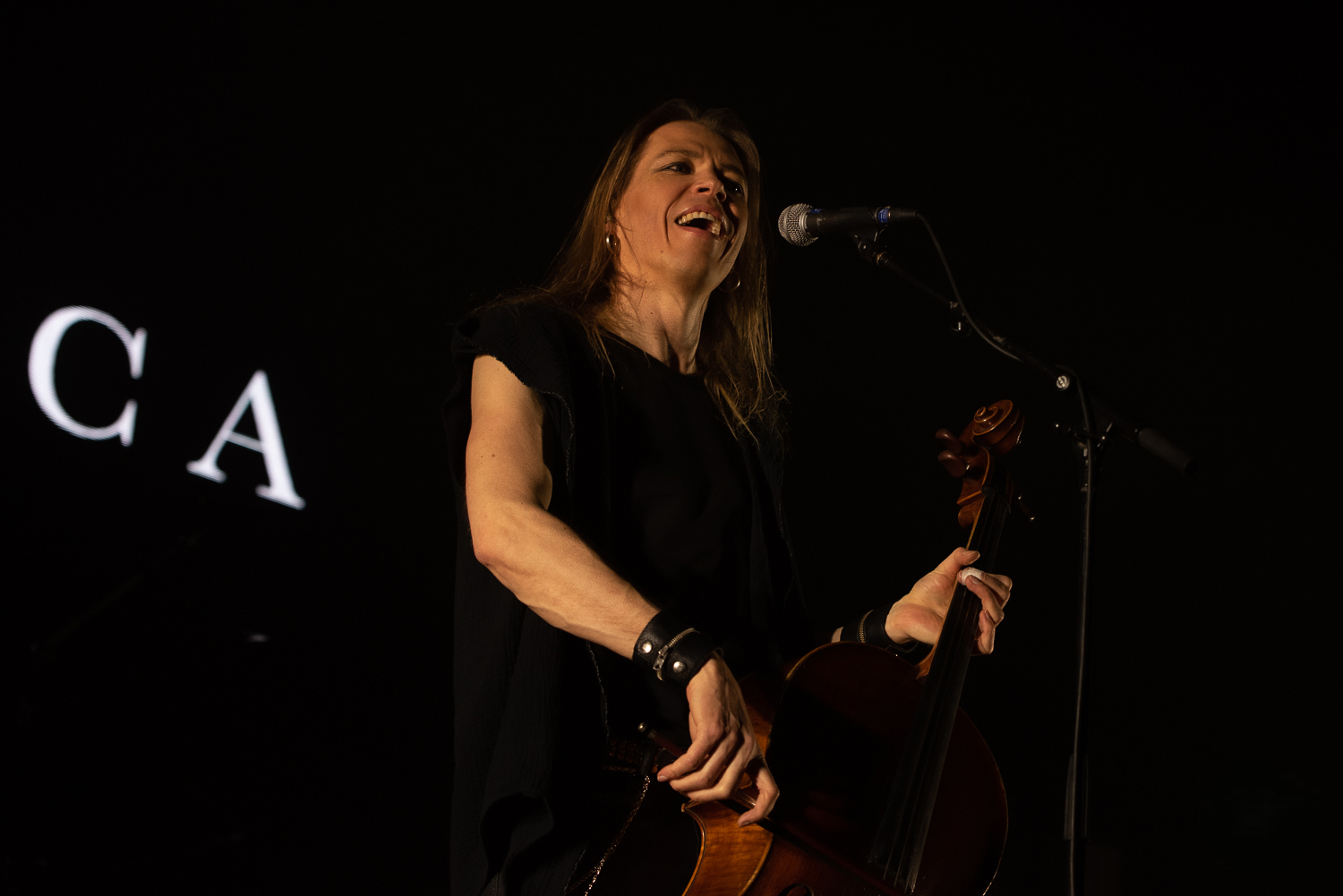
Toppinen

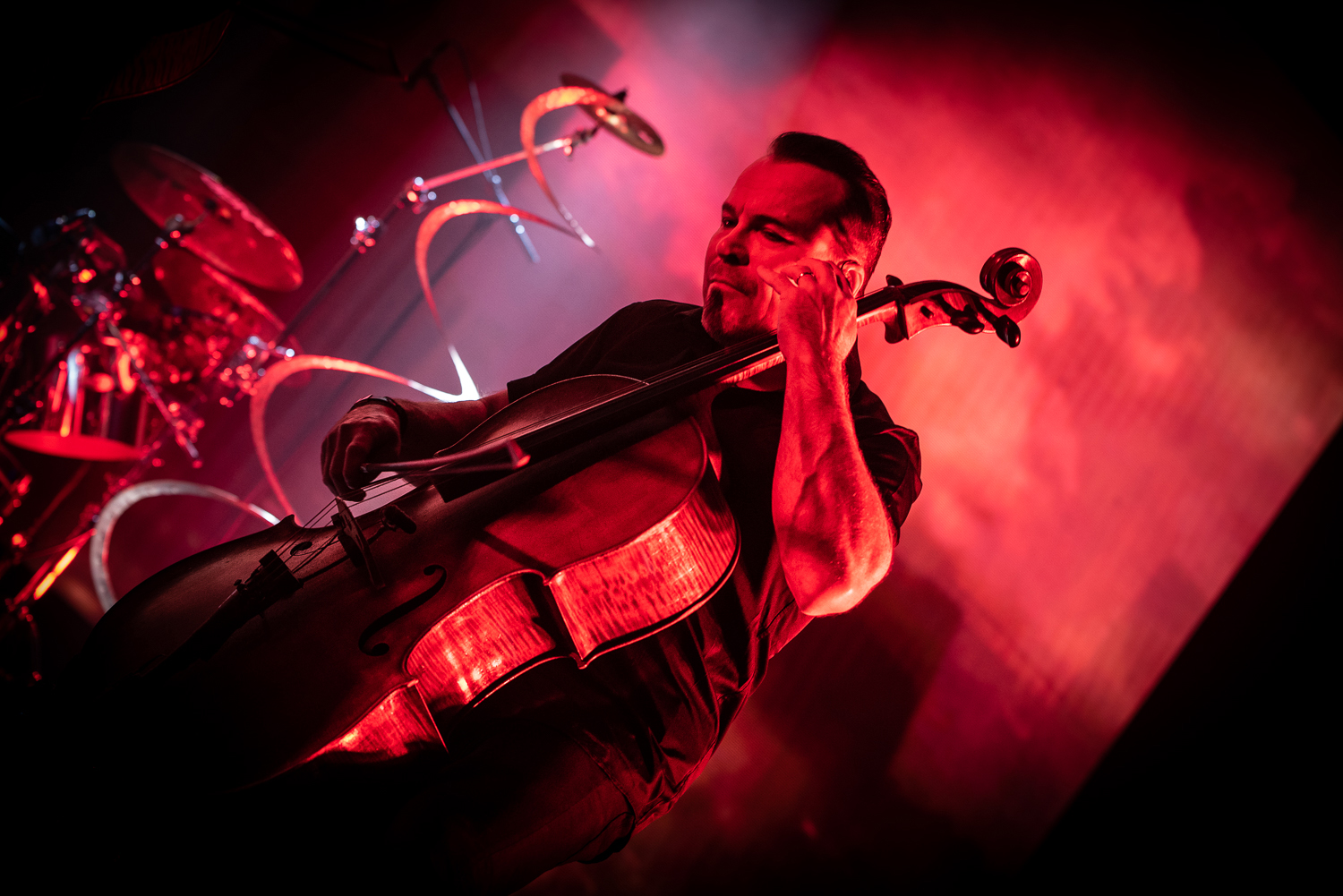
Lötjönen

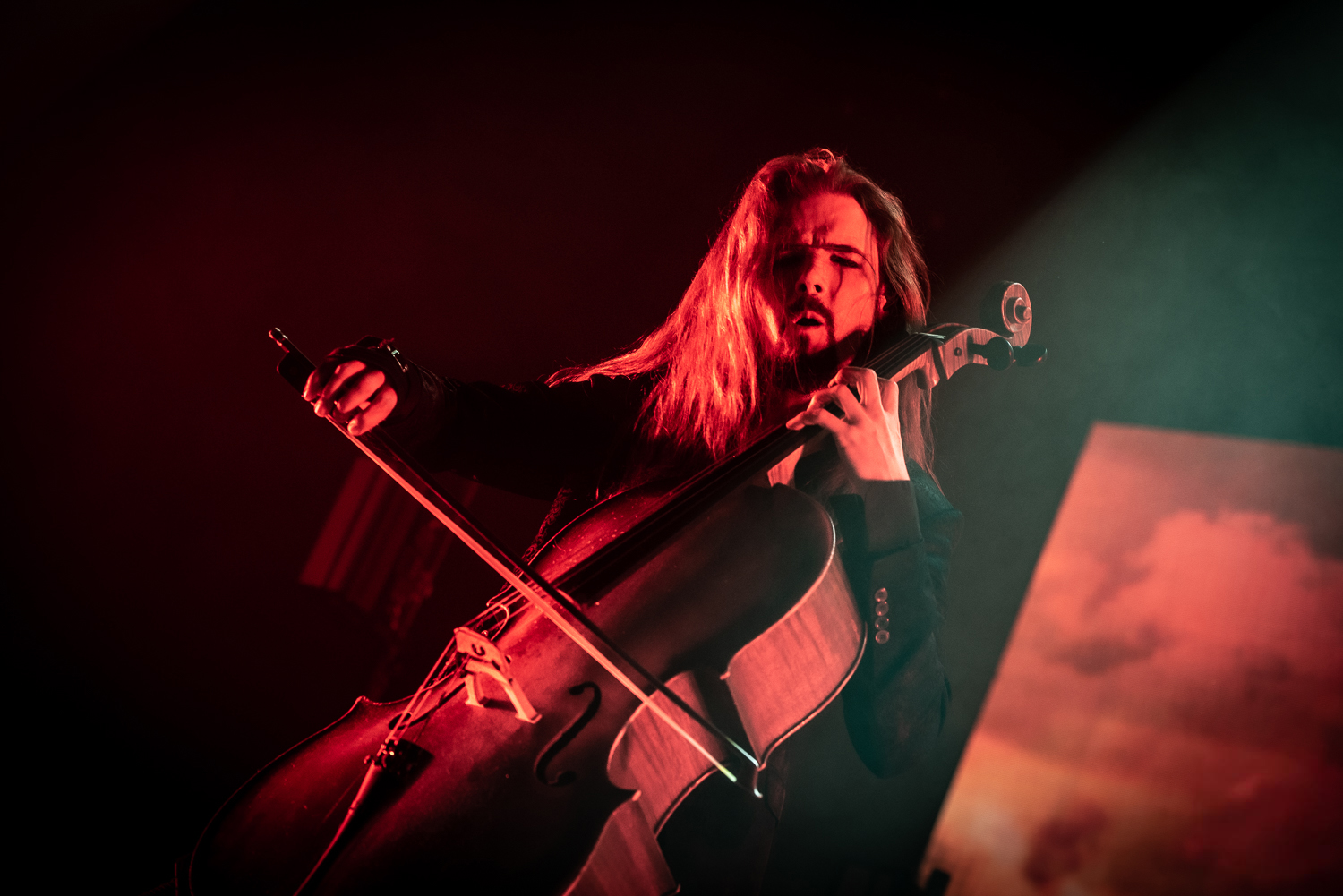
Kivilaakso

Current

- Eicca Toppinen – bandleader, lead cello (original and occasional role), rhythm cello (current role), programming (1993–present)
- Paavo Lötjönen – rhythm/bass cello (1993–present), lead cello on "Master of Puppets" (1996–2019)
- Perttu Kivilaakso – lead cello (current role), programming (1995, 1999–present), rhythm cello (1995, 1999–2002)

Former

- Max Lilja – lead cello (1993–2002)
- Antero Manninen – lead/rhythm cello (official member: 1993–1999; touring member: 2002–2009, 2017–2018)
- Mikko Sirén – drums, percussion, programming (touring member: 2003–2004; official member: 2005–2024)

Touring

- Toryn Green (Fuel) — vocals (2008)
- Tipe Johnson (Leningrad Cowboys) – vocals (2009–2012, 2019)
- Franky Perez – vocals (2014–2016, 2022–2023)
- Lauri Kankkunen – lead/rhythm cello (2019)
- Mikko Kaakkuriniemi – drums (2024–present)

== Discography ==
=== Studio albums ===
- Plays Metallica by Four Cellos (1996)
- Inquisition Symphony (1998)
- Cult (2000)
- Reflections (2003)
- Apocalyptica (2005)
- Worlds Collide (2007)
- 7th Symphony (2010)
- Shadowmaker (2015)
- Cell-0 (2020)
- Plays Metallica, Vol. 2 (2024)

Preceded by Elena Paparizou	Eurovision Song Contest; Final Interval act 2007	Succeeded by Goran Bregović
