= Antero Manninen =

Finnish musician (born 1973)

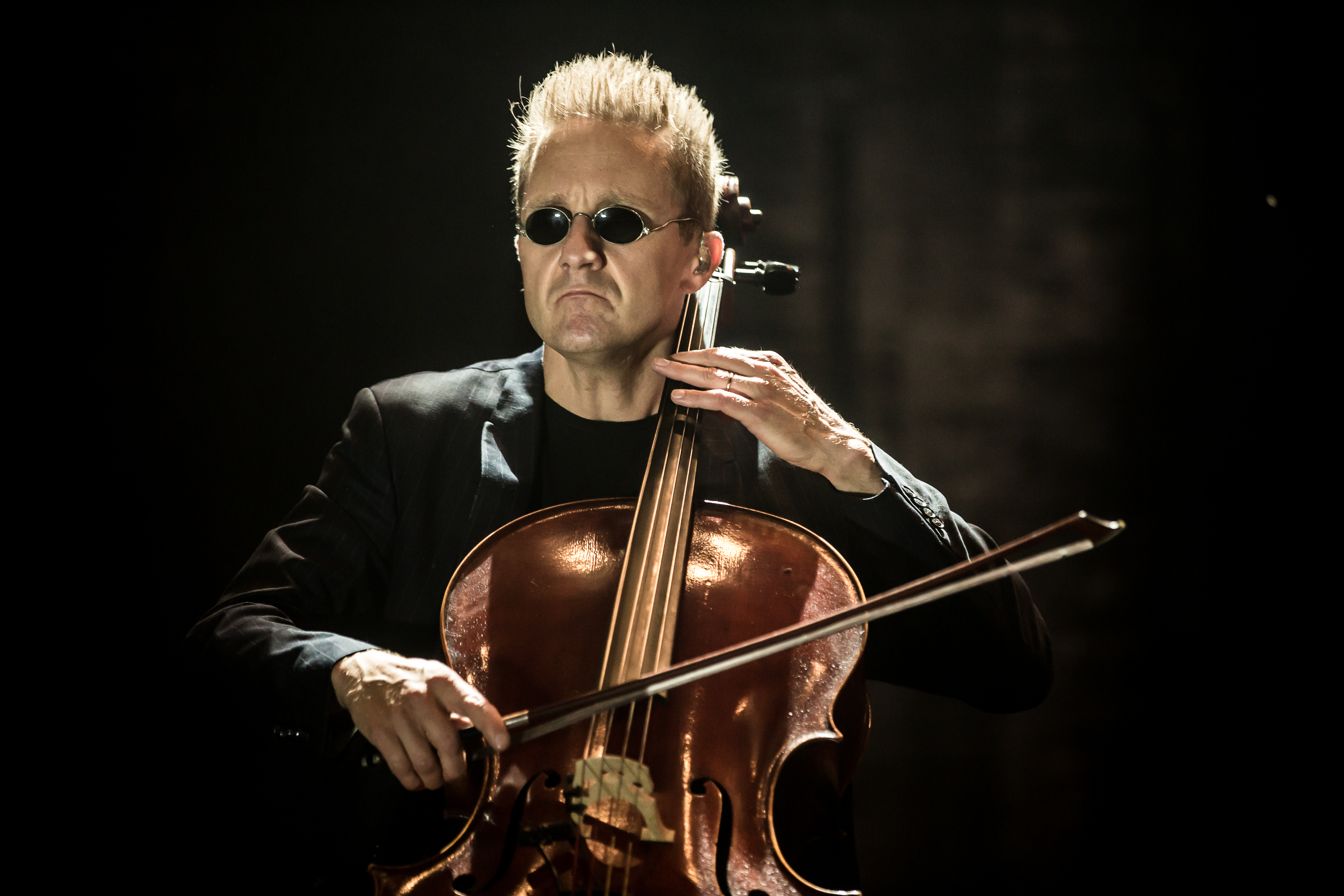
- Manninen performing with Apocalyptica in 2018

Background information
- Born: 19 January 1973 (age 53)
- Origin: Tampere, Finland
- Genres: Classical, chamber
- Occupation: Cellist
- Years active: 1993–present

Antero Manninen (born 19 January 1973) is a Finnish session musician and former band member of the cello metal group Apocalyptica under the stage name Mr. Cool. He was an official member but did not write the music and left in 1999 due to prior commitments, although he has come back to help the band in 2003 to 2009, and 2017 to 2018. His seated, calm composure playing style is at stark contrast with the headbanging antics of the others when playing live. Besides his job in Apocalyptica he used to work as a musician in a Tapiola Sinfonietta Avanti! and Finnish Radio Symphony Orchestra and in the orchestra of the Finnish National Opera. He is also one of the founders of Sibelius-Academy's Cellosextet (SSS). Manninen has also been performing at funerals. Currently he is a member of the Lahti Symphony Orchestra.

== Equipment ==
- Giuseppe Pedrazzini cello (1946).
- L. Breshnev bow.
- Jargar (Larsen in the adjacent picture) top strings and Spirocore (by Thomastik-Infeld) Tungsten bottom strings.
