= Perttu Kivilaakso =

Finnish cellist (born 1978)

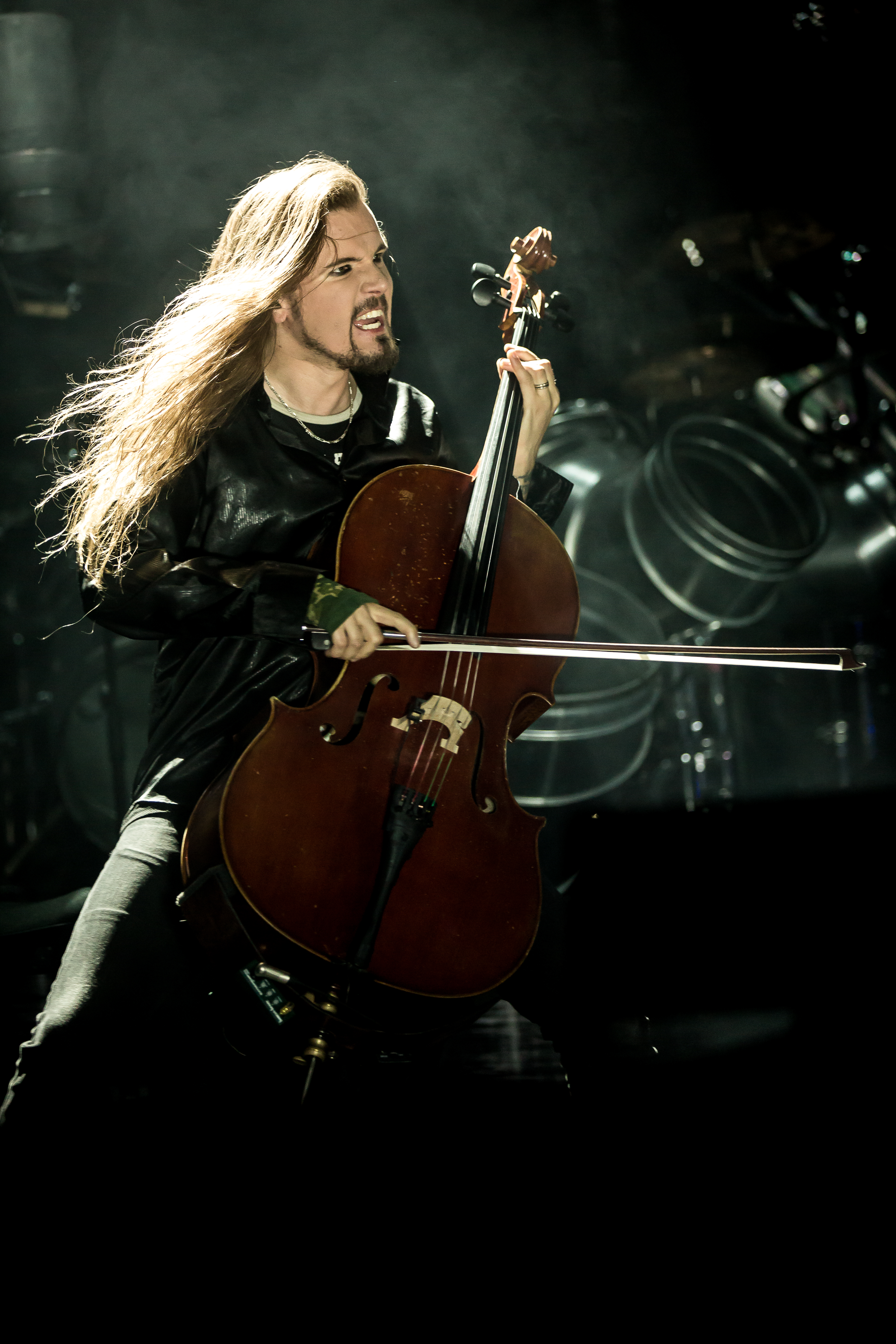
- Kivilaakso at the 2018 at "Drive With Full Force" festival in Ferropolis, Germany

Background information
- Born: 11 May 1978 (age 48)
- Origin: Helsinki, Finland
- Genres: Gothic metal, symphonic metal
- Occupations: Musician, composer
- Instrument: Cello

Perttu Päivö Kullervo Kivilaakso (born 11 May 1978) is a cello player for Finnish band Apocalyptica. Like fellow band members Eicca Toppinen and Paavo Lötjönen, he attended Sibelius Academy in Helsinki. He plays a German 19th century cello; he started playing the cello when he was 5 years old and joined Apocalyptica for their third studio album Cult. Kivilaakso played in Apocalyptica's 1995 line up, but he was concentrating on his studies when the band began their professional career. At the end of 1999 he came back, switching places with Antero Manninen, who then went to play in a classical orchestra.

== Career ==
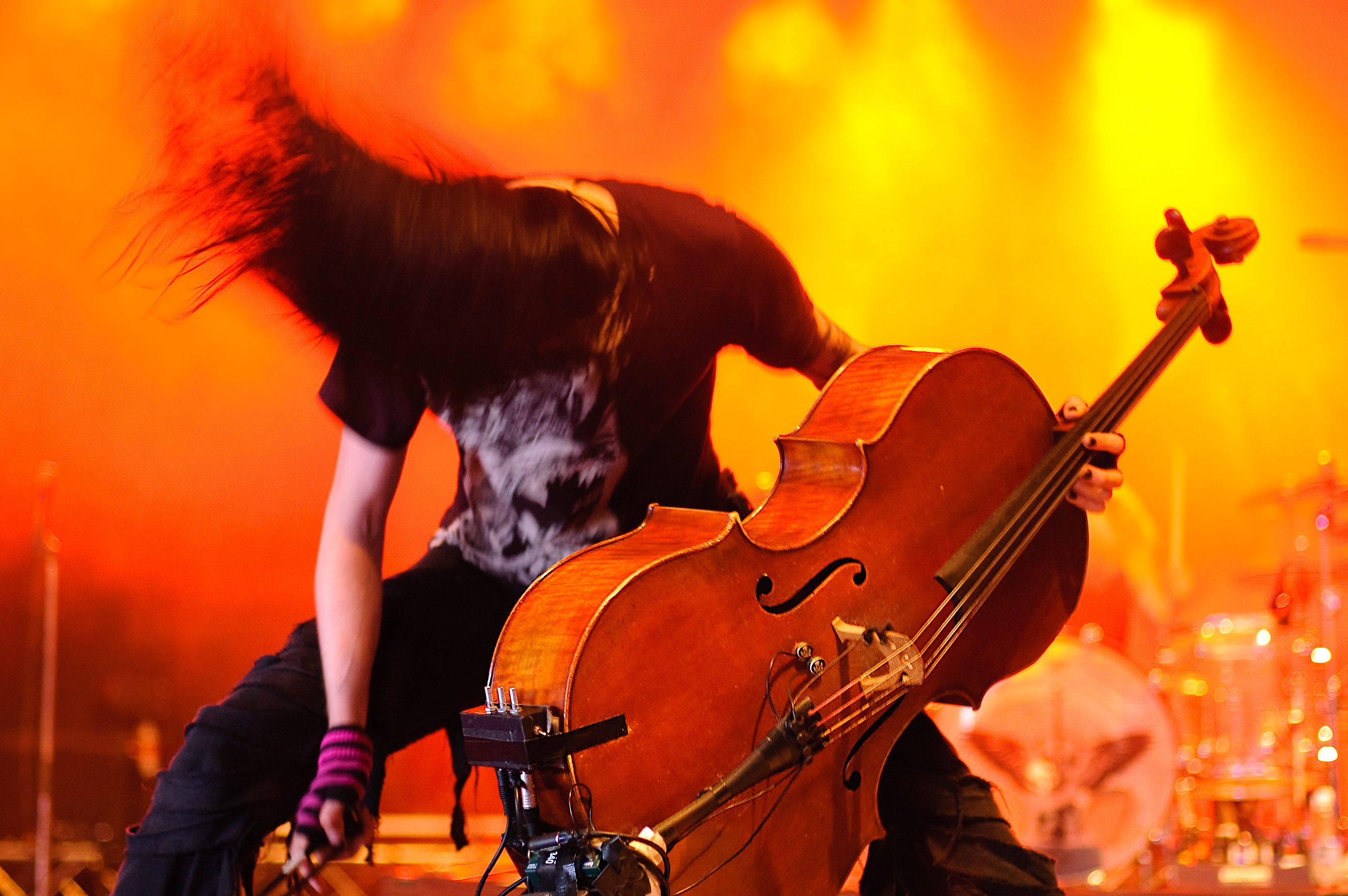
Perttu Kivilaakso performing with Apocalyptica at the Ilosaarirock, 2009

Kivilaakso won third place in the second International Paulo Cello Competition in 1996 at age 18. Shortly afterward, he attained a lifetime chair in the Helsinki Philharmonic Orchestra, where his father, Juhani, is also a cellist. He was on indefinite leave while touring with Apocalyptica, but left for good in 2007.

Kivilaakso has also composed music for the video game Max Payne 2: The Fall of Max Payne, a few documentary films, as well as many original compositions for Apocalyptica, including "Conclusion", "Farewell" and "Beautiful"

His first opera, Indigo, composed with his Apocalyptica bandmate Eicca Toppinen, was premiered at the Finnish National Opera on 22 January 2016. The opera tells "a story of an omnipotent, multinational company and a search for happiness".
