= Eicca Toppinen =

Finnish cellist (born 1975)

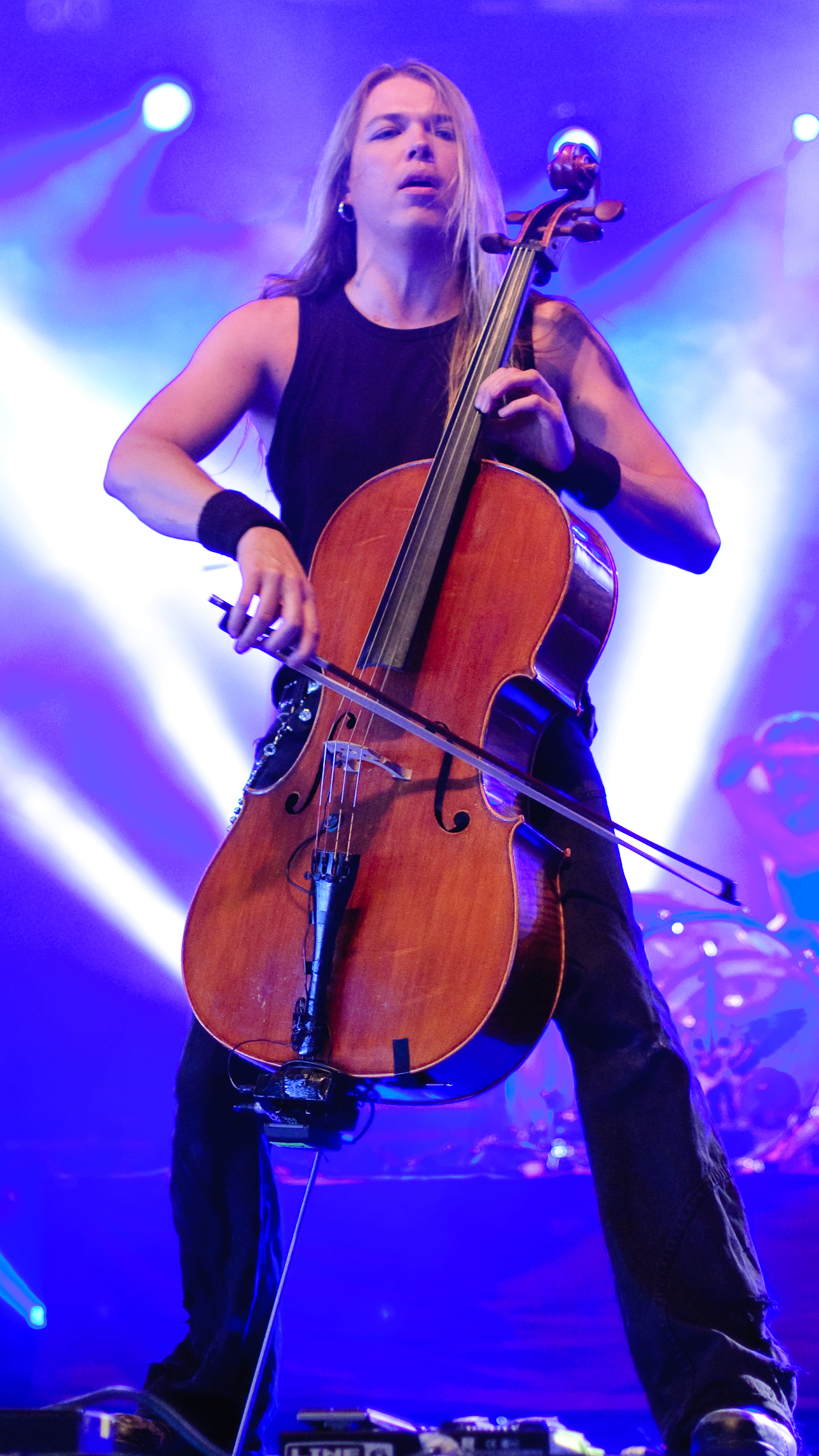
- Toppinen performing in 2009

Background information
- Born: 5 August 1975 (age 51)
- Origin: Vantaa, Finland
- Genres: Symphonic metal; progressive metal
- Occupations: Musician, composer, songwriter
- Instruments: Cello; drums; piano; guitar

Eino Matti "Eicca" Toppinen (born 5 August 1975) is a Finnish cellist, songwriter, producer, and arranger. In 1993 he formed the quartet Apocalyptica.

== Biography ==
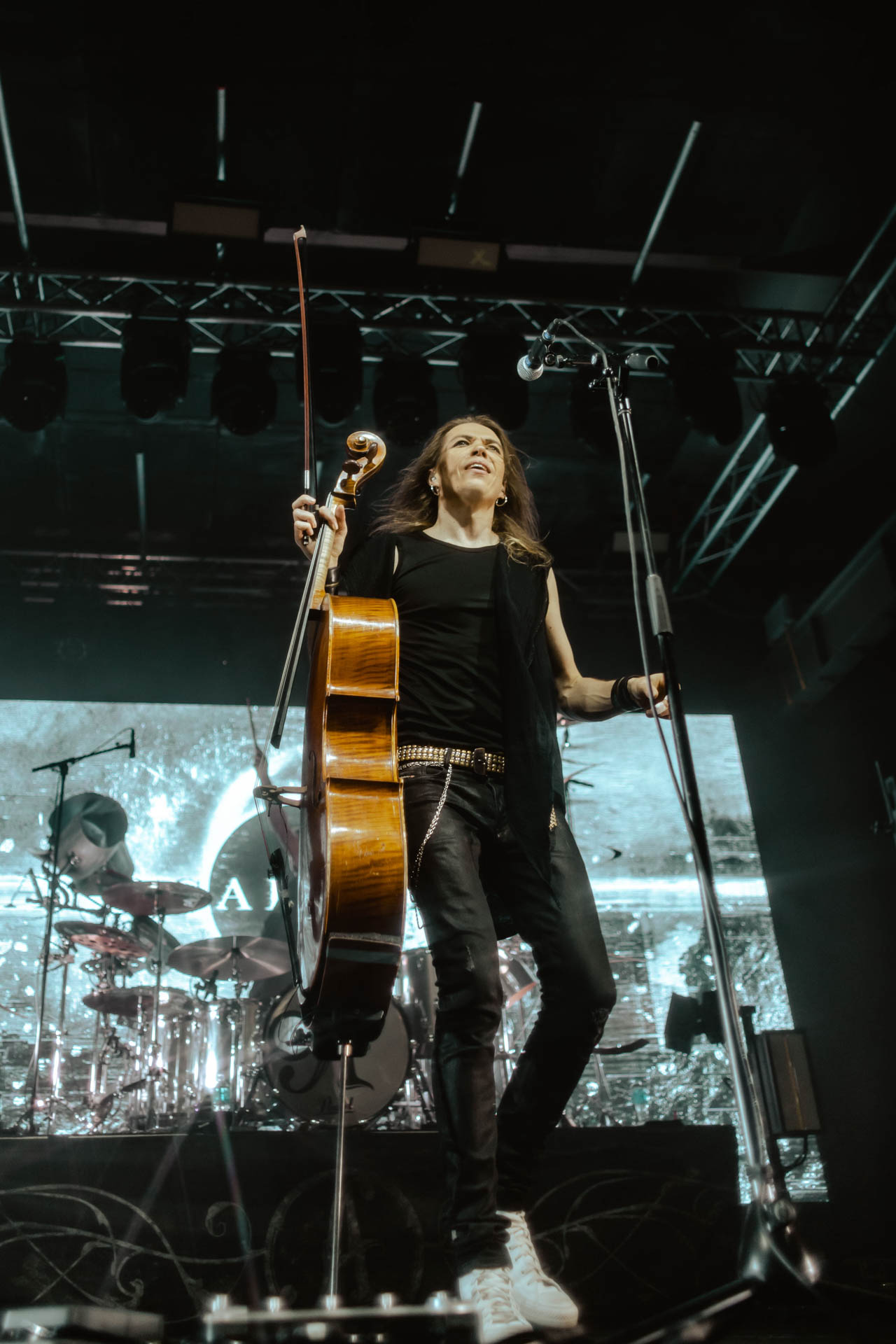
Toppinen in Poland, 2023

Toppinen grew up in Vantaa's Hakunila and has three sisters and one brother, all of whom took instrument lessons while growing up. He started playing cello when he was nine. He and his sisters made several amateur recordings for their family, usually for Christmas.

He attended the Sibelius Academy in Helsinki, where he met future Apocalyptica band members Paavo Lötjönen, Antero Manninen, and Max Lilja. He played for several orchestras, including Finnish Radio Symphony Orchestra and Avanti! chamber orchestra. He's also a founding member of the Sibelius Academy's Cellosextet. When attending Sibelius Academy, Eicca could not get an apartment or student support money because he lived too close to Helsinki, where the Academy resides.

In 1993, when Toppinen was still studying in Sibelius Academy, the young Vivo Christian Orchestra played three songs from the Metallica album, Ride The Lightning. According to Toppinen, he bought a book of guitar music for the album, and did not have notes for any other albums.

Two years later, Apocalyptica performed at Teatro Heavy Metal Club in Helsinki, on the same night with His Infernal Majesty, later to be known as HIM. A week later, Kari Hynninen of Zen Garden Records contacted Eicca to discuss a deal to make their very first record, Plays Metallica by Four Cellos.

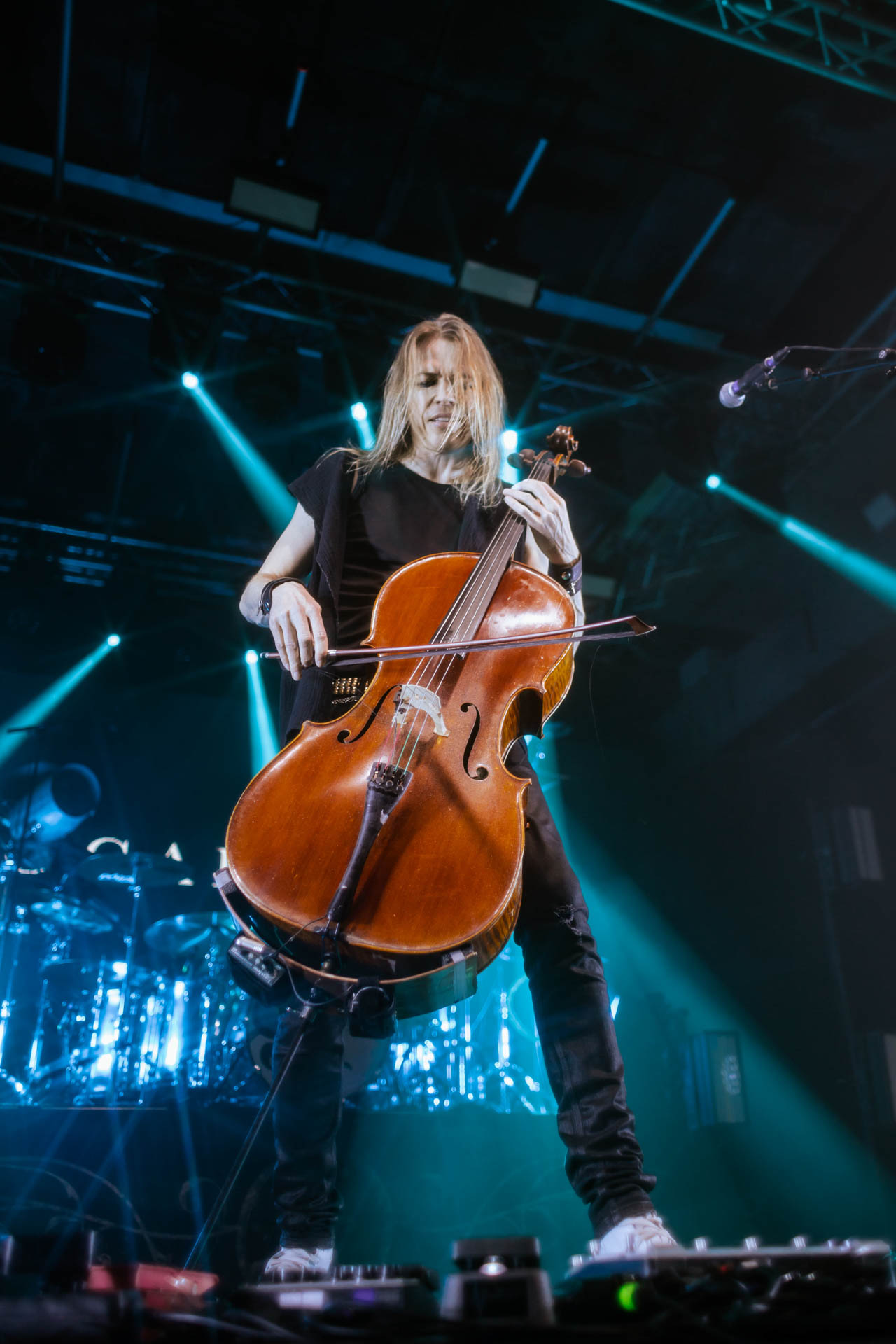
Eicca Toppinen in Poland 2023

After first writing songs for Apocalyptica, Toppinen also became involved in various other projects, such as the theatrical performance of Paper Rain and the Finnish Film Milja. In 2007, Toppinen composed the soundtrack for the Finnish movie Musta Jää (Black Ice). On 3 February 2008 he won a Jussi Award for writing the score. He also wrote the movie's main theme song, sung by Hanna Pakarinen.

In December 2007, Toppinen was invited to the Finnish Independence Day Presidential Reception in Helsinki, which he attended with his wife, Kirsi, and was prominently featured in the media. This caused him to miss Apocalyptica's sold-out show in Strasbourg, France - the first time he had ever missed a performance by his band in 14 years.

Toppinen was responsible for writing the score for the classical-metal crossover project Wagner Reloaded-Live in Leipzig which was recorded live in Leipzig Arena in July 2013 and released as an Apocalyptica album in November 2013.

Toppinen has also composed an opera commissioned by the Finnish National Opera, with his Apocalyptica bandmate Perttu Kivilaakso. Their opera is titled Indigo, and "tells a sci-fi influenced story of an omnipotent multinational company and the search for happiness", premiered on 22 January 2016.

In 2020, Toppinen was a guest panelist on the first season of the TV show Masked Singer Suomi.

Toppinen says his biggest achievement is Apocalyptica.

In addition to being a cellist in Apocalyptica, he is also the drummer of the former Finnish rock band Cherry & The Vipers (together with his ex-wife, Kirsi).

== Personal life ==
Toppinen married Kirsi Ylijoki, a Finnish actress, in 1997. They lived in an expansive rural area in Sipoo, Finland.They have two children: Eelis, born in 1998, and Ilmari, born in 2002. They divorced in 2020. Toppinen lives in Oslo, Norway, with his second wife Marianne Lindbeck, whom he married in September 2026.

== Equipment ==
Cello

Lupot (1787) Postiglione (1857)

Bow

Guillaume A. Vigneron

Strings

Thomastik-Infeld Spirocore
