= Paavo Lötjönen =

Finnish cellist (born 1968)

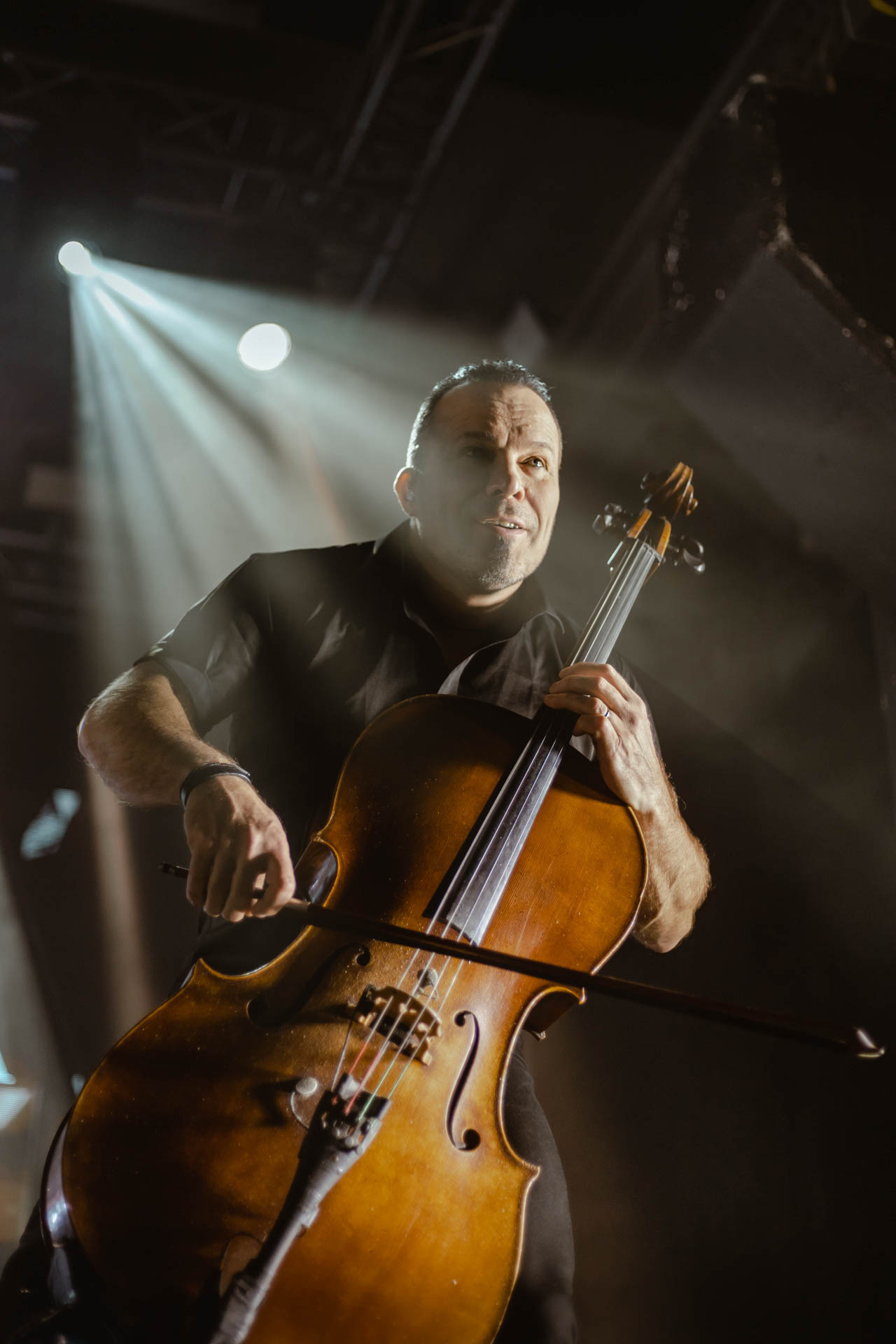
- Lötjönen performing in 2023

Background information
- Born: 29 July 1968 (age 57)
- Origin: Kuopio, Finland
- Genres: Cello rock Symphonic metal
- Occupation: Musician
- Instrument: Cello

Paavo Lötjönen (born 29 July 1968) is a cello player for Finnish band Apocalyptica. Paavo comes from a family where both of his parents were professional musicians. At the age of 6, he took a cello and decided that would be the instrument he would play all his life. Like fellow band members Perttu Kivilaakso and Eicca Toppinen, he attended Sibelius Academy in Helsinki.

20 years later, Paavo got his "Solist Cellist" diploma at the Sibelius Academy, and shortly after began to work as a cello teacher in music schools. He played in the "Finnish National Opera" as well. He plays a Gulbrandt Enger cello (1882) with a R. Wainio bow.

Apart from his work with Apocalyptica, he is a cello teacher and a skiing instructor. He also enjoys sky-diving, windsurfing, and water skiing.
