= Guano Apes discography =

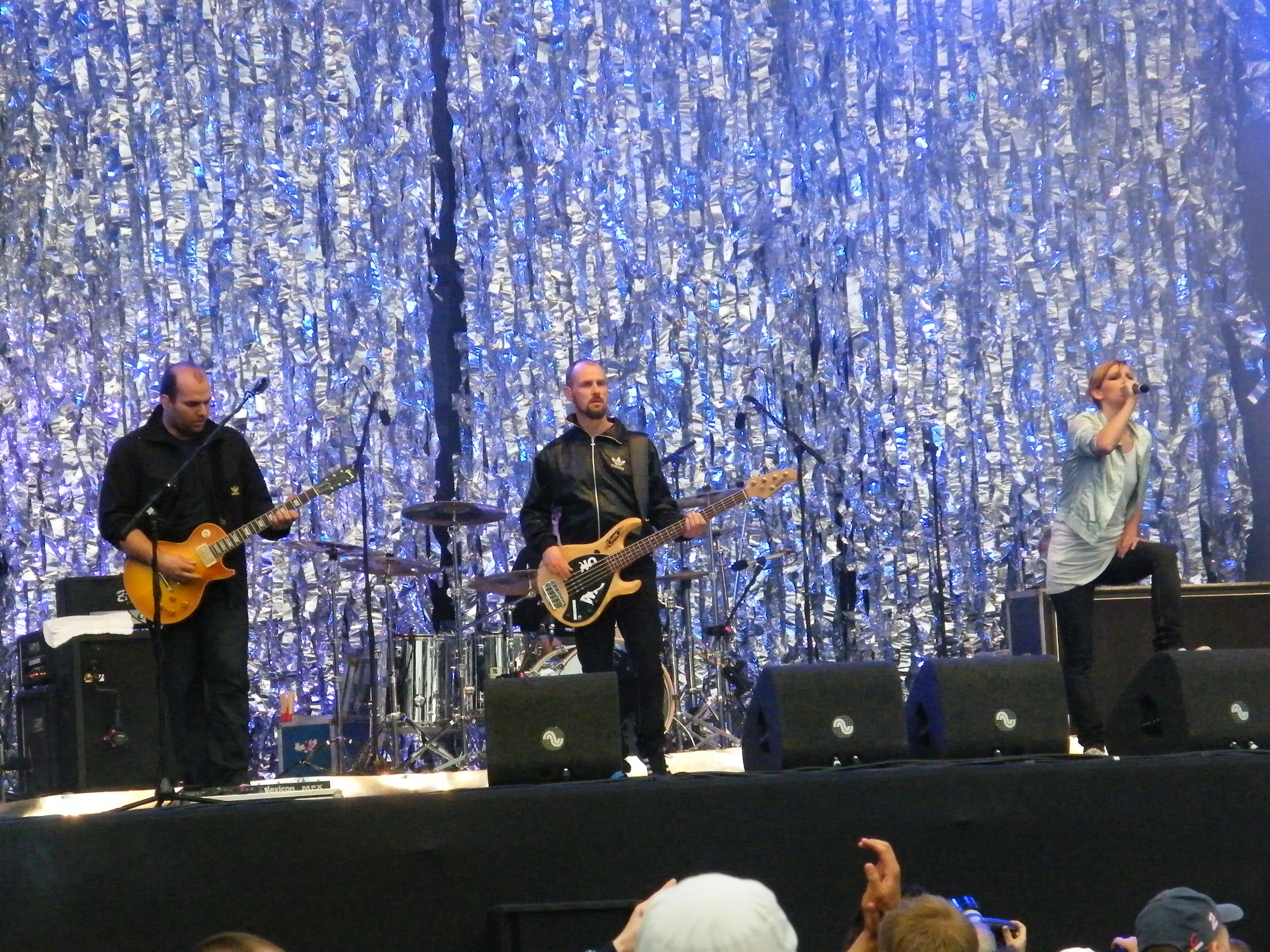
- Guano Apes live at Bospop (2009)
- Studio albums: 5
- Live albums: 1
- Compilation albums: 2
- Singles: 18
- Video albums: 5
- Music videos: 20

Guano Apes are an alternative rock band formed in 1994 in Göttingen, Germany. The group members are Sandra Nasić (vocals), Henning Rümenapp (guitars, backing vocals), Stefan Ude (bass, backing vocals) and Dennis Poschwatta (drums, backing vocals).

Their sound has been described as a fusion of metal, pop and rap.Their music is usually labeled as alternative rock and alternative metal.

Their discography consists of five studio albums: one live album, two compilation albums, eighteen singles and five video albums.

== Studio albums ==
Year	Album details	Peak chart positions									Sales	Certifications
Year	Album details	GER	AUT	BEL	FIN	FRA	ITA	NL	PRT	SWI	Sales	Certifications
1997	Proud Like a God: Released: 6 October 1997; Label: BMG, GUN/Supersonic Records; Format: CD, cassette	5	5	13	—	—	—	27	—	13	WW: 3,000,000	AFP: Platinum; BEA: Gold; BVMI: Platinum; FIMI: Gold; IFPI AUT: Gold; IFPI SWI: Platinum; NVPI: Gold; ZPAV: Gold
2000	Don't Give Me Names: Released: 2 May 2000; Label: BMG, GUN/Supersonic Records; Format: CD, cassette	1	1	13	14	—	19	27	—	5		AFP: Platinum; BVMI: Gold; IFPI SWI: Gold
2003	Walking on a Thin Line: Released: 25 March 2003; Label: BMG, GUN/Supersonic Records; Format: CD, cassette, Digital download	1	5	—	9	123	—	18	16	8	GER: 150,000	AFP: Silver; BVMI: Gold
2011	Bel Air: Released: 1 April 2011; Label: Columbia Europe; Format: CD, music download	1	5	—	—	—	—	—	—	2		BVMI: Gold
2014	Offline: Released: 30 May 2014; Label: Columbia Europe; Format: CD, music download	8	26	—	—	—	—	—	—	31		
"—" denotes releases that did not chart.

== Live albums ==
Year	Album details	Peak chart positions									Sales	Certifications
Year	Album details	GER	AUT	BEL	FIN	FRA	ITA	NL	PRT	SWI	Sales	Certifications
2003	Live: Released: 25 November 2003; Label: BMG, GUN/Supersonic Records; Format:	26	47	—	—	—	—	—	22	58		

== Compilation albums ==
Year	Album details	Peak chart positions									Sales	Certifications
Year	Album details	GER	AUT	BEL	FIN	FRA	ITA	NL	PRT	SWI	Sales	Certifications
2004	Planet of the Apes: Released: 29 November 2004; Label: BMG; Format:	32	33	—	—	—	—	—	—	28		
2006	Lost (T)apes: Released: 4 December 2006; Label: BMG, GUN/Supersonic Records; Format:	—	—	—	—	—	—	—	—	—		

== Singles ==
Year	Title	Peak chart positions								Certifications	Album
Year	Title	GER	AUT	SWI	NL	BEL	IT	UK	US Main. Rock	Certifications	Album
1997	"Open Your Eyes"	5	10	11	19	14	8	—	24	GER: Gold	Proud Like a God
1998	"Rain"	76	—	—	—	—	—	—	—		Proud Like a God
1998	"Lords of the Boards"	10	10	34	80	11	—	—	—	GER: Gold	Proud Like a God
1999	"Don't You Turn Your Back on Me"	50	—	—	—	—	—	—	—		Meschugge OST
2000	"Big in Japan"	9	19	24	82	54	5	—	—		Don't Give Me Names
2000	"No Speech"	75	—	—	—	—	—	—	—		Don't Give Me Names
2000	"Living in a Lie"	84	—	—	97	—	—	—	—		Don't Give Me Names
2001	"Dödel Up"	57	—	—	—	—	—	—	—		Don't Give Me Names
2001	"Kumba Yo!" ^{a}	3	4	12	—	—	—	—	—		Non-album single
2003	"You Can't Stop Me"	10	15	69	65	60	19	99	—		Walking on a Thin Line
2003	"Pretty in Scarlet"	51	55	—	—	—	—	—	—		Walking on a Thin Line
2003	"Quietly"	51	52	—	—	—	—	—	—		Walking on a Thin Line
2004	"Break the Line"	45	—	—	—	—	—	—	—		Planet of the Apes
2011	"Oh What a Night"	37	68	51	—	—	—	—	—		Bel Air
2011	"Sunday Lover"	—	—	—	—	—	—	—	—		Bel Air
2011	"This Time"	—	—	—	—	—	—	—	—		Bel Air
2012	"When the Ships Arrive"	—	—	—	—	—	—	—	—		Bel Air
2014	"Close to the Sun"	86	—	—	—	—	—	—	—		Offline
"—" denotes releases that did not chart.

- ^a as Guano Babes featuring Michael Mittermeier

== Music videos ==
Year	Title	Director
1997	Open Your Eyes	Liz Wendelbo
1998	Rain	Heiner Thimm, Andreas Marschall
1998	Lords of the Boards	Erçin Filizli
1999	Don't You Turn Your Back On Me	Daniel Lwowski
1999	Open Your Eyes	Jeannine Panaccione
2000	Big In Japan	Erçin Filizli
2000	No Speech	Jorf Somner
2000	Living In A Lie	Erçin Filizli
2000	I Want It	n/a
2001	Kumba Yo!	Norman Hafezi
2001	Dödel Up	Gerhard Hahn
2003	Pretty In Scarlet	Joern Heitmann
2003	You Can't Stop Me	Joern Heitmann
2003	Quietly	Joern Heitmann
2003	Sing That Song	n/a
2004	Sugar Skin	n/a
2004	Break The Line	n/a
2011	Oh What a Night	Markus Gerwinat
2011	Sunday Lover	Markus Gerwinat
2011	This Time	Oliver Sommer
2012	When the Ships Arrive	Holger Gutt
2014	Close to the sun	Joffrey Jans
2014	Fake	
2017	Lose Yourself	Marcel Brell
2017	Open Your Eyes feat. Danko Jones	Marcel Brell
2017	Suzie	Marcel Brell

== Video albums ==
- Guano T-Apes (VHS, 1998)
- Don't Give Me Names (VHS & DVD, 2000)
- Live (DVD, 2003)
- Planet of the Apes / The Documentary (DVD) (2005)
- Guano Apes – Live @ Rockpalast (2012)

Guano T-apes is a video that documents the development of the Guano Apes from their beginning. With the band and individual interviews, you get to know the members of the band better and experience curiosities and events from daily life in the music business. Along with the video clips, it contains much live material shot during the tours from Nov. 1997 through the summer of 1998. The video was directed by Richard Anjou and edited by Mathias Dohmbrinck.
