= Planet of the Apes: Best of Guano Apes =

Planet of the Apes

Greatest hits album by Guano Apes
- Released: 29 November 2004
- Recorded: 1996–2004
- Genre: Alternative rock, nu metal
- Label: BMG

Guano Apes chronology
Live (2003)	Planet of the Apes (2004)	Lost (T)apes (2006)

Singles from Planet of the Apes
- 1. "Break the Line" Released: 24 October 2004

Planet of the Apes: Best of Guano Apes is a greatest hits album by German rock band Guano Apes, released on 29 November 2004.

== Versions ==
The album is distributed by BMG and is available in three versions:

1. DIGIPAK (2 CD-Pack-PREMIUM)
2. STANDARD-Edition
3. BASIC-Edition

The album features all of their singles, their favourite songs and one new song – "Break the Line". The digipak version contains the second disc consisting of remixes and B-sides. It was the last album released by the band before they took a one-year hiatus in 2005, however it later became an indefinite hiatus due to lead singer Sandra Nasic starting her solo career and the remaining three formed IO. The album charted at number 32 in their native Germany.

== Track listing ==
All tracks are written by Sandra Nasić, Henning Rümenapp, Stefan Ude and Dennis Poschwatta unless otherwise noted.

Disc 1

1. "Break the Line" – 3:33
2. "Open Your Eyes" – 3:09 (from Proud Like a God, 1997)
3. "Big in Japan" (Marian Gold, Bernard Lloyd, Frank Mertens) – 2:49 (from Don't Give Me Names, 2000)
4. "Rain" – 4:35 (from Proud Like a God)
5. "No Speech" – 3:29 (from Don't Give Me Names)
6. "Innocent Greed" – 3:51 (from Don't Give Me Names)
7. "Living in a Lie" – 4:33 (from Don't Give Me Names)
8. "Dödel Up" (Single Edit) – 3:22 (from Don't Give Me Names)
9. "Lords of the Boards" – 3:42 (from Proud Like a God)
10. "Pretty in Scarlet" – 4:06 (from Walking on a Thin Line, 2003)
11. "Mine All Mine" – 3:49 (from Don't Give Me Names)
12. "Quietly" – 3:37 (from Walking on a Thin Line)
13. "You Can't Stop Me" – 3:13 (from Walking on a Thin Line)
14. "Wash It Down" – 3:06 (from Proud Like a God)
15. "Scratch the Pitch" – 3:47 (from Walking on a Thin Line)
16. "Don't You Turn Your Back on Me" – 3:46 (from Meschugge OST, 1999)
17. "Gogan" – 2:48 (from Don't Give Me Names)
18. "Kumba Yo!" (Nasić, Rümenapp, Ude, Poschwatta, Michael Mittermeier) – 3:22 (non-album single, 2001)

Disc 2 (Digipak edition only)

1. "Stay" – 3:48 (B-side to "Break the Line")
2. "Underwear" – 3:28 (B-side to "Break the Line")
3. "La Noix" – 2:19 (B-side to "Big in Japan")
4. "Cuts" – 3:34 (B-side to "Dödel Up")
5. "Candy Love" – 3:33 (B-side to "Dödel Up")
6. "Trumpet Song" – 2:54 (B-side to "You Can't Stop Me")
7. "Cream Over Moon" – 3:40 (B-side to "Quietly")
8. "Allies" – 3:08 (B-side to "Quietly")
9. "Ain't Got Time" – 2:42 (from Don't Give Me Names digipak edition and b-side to "No Speech")
10. "Electric Nights" – 3:26 (from Walking on a Thin Line digipak edition)
11. "Counting the Days" – 3:38 (from Walking on a Thin Line digipak edition)
12. "Open Your Eyes" (Calcia Mix) – 6:37 (remix B-side to "Open Your Eyes")
13. "Maria" (D+B Smooth Mix) – 5:26 (remix B-side to "Open Your Eyes" and "Rain")
14. "360° Aliendrop" (Kaleve Mix) – 4:10 (Remix of "Lords of the Boards" )
15. "Don't You Turn Your Back on Me" (Frozen Mix) – 4:05 (remix B-side to "Don't You Turn Your Back on Me")
16. "Big in Japan" (Space Jazz Dubmen Mix) – 4:32 (remix B-side to "Big in Japan")
17. "Dödel Up" (Kukliczi Mix) – 4:16 (remix B-side to "Dödel Up")
18. "Plastic Mouth" (G-Ball & Kaa Mix) – 4:05 (remix B-side to "You Can't Stop Me")
19. "Pretty in Storm" (G-Ball & Kaa Mix) – 3:46 (remix B-side to "Pretty in Scarlet")

Disc 2
Lost (T)apes (Basic edition only)

1. "Your Song"
2. "Hanoi"
3. "Maria"
4. "Diokhan"
5. "Open Your Eyes"
6. "Get Busy"
7. "Ignaz"
8. "Rain"
9. "Wasserfliege"
10. "Come and Feel"
11. "Running Away"
12. "Dreamin'"

== Personnel ==
Guano Apes

- Sandra Nasić – vocals
- Henning Rümenapp – guitars, backing vocals
- Stefan Ude – bass, backing vocals
- Dennis Poschwatta – drums, backing vocals

Additional musicians

- Michael Mittermeier – vocals on "Kumba Yo!"
