= Live (Guano Apes album) =

Live album by Guano Apes
- Released: 4 November 2003
- Recorded: 2 May 2003
- Venue: Palladium (Cologne)
- Genre: Alternative rock, nu metal
- Length: 77:09
- Label: Supersonic; GUN; BMG

Guano Apes chronology
Walking on a Thin Line (2003)	Live (2003)	Planet of the Apes (2004)

Live is an album of live recordings by German rock band Guano Apes, released in 2003.

== Track listing ==
1. "Quietly" (3:40)
2. "No Speech" (3:46)
3. "Money & Milk" (2:38)
4. "Pretty in Scarlet" (3:56)
5. "We Use the Pain" (2:41)
6. "Living in a Lie" (4:17)
7. "Open Your Eyes" (2:54)
8. "Dick" (2:44)
9. "Sing That Song" (3:18)
10. "Mine All Mine" (5:18)
11. "Sugar Skin" (3:59)
12. "Move a Little Closer" (3:19)
13. "You Can't Stop Me" (3:35)
14. "Scratch the Pitch" (3:30)
15. "Big in Japan" (3:27)
16. "Dödel Up" (7:40)
17. "Wash It Down" (3:44)
18. "Diokhan" (4:35)
19. "Gogan" (2:41)
20. "Lords of the Boards" (5:27)

== Limited edition ==
A limited edition version of the album was also released with an additional 20 tracks contained on a bonus 80 minute DVD.

== DVD chapter listing ==
1. "Quietly" (3:33)
2. "No Speech" (3:43)
3. "Money & Milk" (2:36)
4. "Pretty in Scarlet" (3:49)
5. "We Use the Pain" (2:37)
6. "Living in a Lie" (4:19)
7. "Open Your Eyes" (2:50)
8. "Dick" (3:33)
9. "Sing That Song" (3:08)
10. "Mine All Mine" (5:13)
11. "Sugar Skin" (3:58)
12. "Move a Little Closer" (3:18)
13. "You Can't Stop Me" (3:33)
14. "Scratch the Pitch" (3:27)
15. "Big in Japan" (2:58)
16. "Trompeter" (2:36)
17. "Dödel Up" (7:34)
18. "Diokhan" (4:32)
19. "Kumba Yo!" (3:36)
20. "Lords of the Boards" (5:55)
