= Artemis Gounaki =

Greek-German singer and composer

Artemis Gounaki Άρτεμις Γουνάκη
- Born: Artemis Gounaki; 7 April 1967 (age 59); Munich, West Germany
- Occupations: Singer, songwriter, arranger, vocal voach
- Website: www.artemisvoicemusic.ch

Artemis Gounaki (Greek Άρτεμις Γουνάκη; born 7 April 1967 in Munich) is a Greek-German singer, vocal coach, songwriter, composer, and arranger who has done much of her work in Greek. Gounaki's father was born on the Greek island of Crete.

Artemis Gounaki is a vocal coach and has participated in various Popstars seasons in German, Greek and Swiss television such as on RTL II and ProSieben. Being a vocal-producer and arranger, Gounaki has worked with well-known German bands such as Bro'Sis, Preluders, Nu Pagadi, Overground, H-Blockx and Guano Apes). Many of the bands have already reached gold and platinum status in Germany. Gounaki also supports the finalists and winners of Popstars in Switzerland and Greece.

Moreover, she was singing, writing and composing for her band Illegal Aliens with Marco Minnemann, who is her former husband.

She lives in Munich, (Germany), Athens, Greece, Zurich, Switzerland, and in Crete. She has one son.

== Career ==
Gounaki had worked with many artists even before her Popstars debut. She worked with Henning Wehland on his voice for his bands' recordings Fly Eyes of his band H-Blockx. After that Gounaki coached, arranged and produced the vocals of Sandra Nasic, singer of the band Guano Apes for Don't Give Me Names and Walking on a Thin Line and was their steady tour coach and friend during their worldwide tours ( 1998–2002).

In 2001, Gounaki became the vocal coach of the German TV show Popstars. Her work helped the winning band Bro'Sis selling over 1,500,000 copies of their debut album Never Forget within three days. Later, she extended her work to different countries. In 2003, she moved to Athens to become the vocal coach of the Greek version of Popstars and to work on the vocal-production of the winning band Hi-5.

During that time, she also worked on the German Popstars show, which took place in Orlando, Florida US and created the two bands Preluders and Overground. After finishing that production, Gounaki went to Greece to arrange and to produce the Christmas CD of Hi-5, Mia Nihta San K'iafti.

After this, Gounaki was one of the judges on the Greek TV Show Eurostars. The show was won by Apostolos Psihraimis who was supposed to represent the country in the Eurovision Song Contest 2004. However, ERT internally chose superstar Sakis Rouvas and sent him to the Eurovision Song Contest in Istanbul, where Rouvas finished in third place, equalling Greece's best result up to that point.

When she returned to Germany, Gounaki coached, arranged and recorded the new Popstars band Nu Pagadi.

Gounaki cooperates with music producers and musicians such as Greg Manning, Toni Cottura or Marc Mozart, Lou Bega, T.M.Stevens, Leslie Mandoki, Uwe Fahrenkrog-Petersen, Thorsten Brötzmann or Peter Ries and works for major record companies like Sony BMG or Universal Music.

However, she took a break for nine months to spend more time with her family. In October 2005, Gounaki published a book called Singen? Kann jeder! (Everyone can sing), which she had written while she was on hiatus. The following month, she took up studies at LMU Munich to study architecture.

Together with German Pop Idol Alexander Klaws and German singer Jeanette Biedermann, Gounaki returned to television with the show Beste Stimme gesucht (Best voice wanted) on KI.KA, a German TV channel for children. The show scouted for children with a talent for singing. Gounaki also worked very closely with Jeanette Biedermann during her Bad Girls Club Tour 2006 as her voice coach. Her next TV project as vocal coach and a vocal-producer was a Swiss audition show called Musicstar in winter 2006/07 on SF1.

== TV ==
- 2001 – Popstars/ RTL2 Germany (Bro'Sis)
- 2003 – Popstars/ MegaTV Greece (Hi-5)
- 2003 – Popstars "Das Duell"/ Pro Sieben Germany (Preluders, Overground)
- 2004 – Eurostar/ NET Greece (Sakis Rouvas)
- 2004 – Popstars "Jetzt Oder Nie"/ Pro Sieben Germany (Nu Pagadi)
- 2005 – Die Burg/ Pro Sieben Germany
- 2005 – Kika Live/ KI.KA Germany
- 2006/2007 – Musicstar/ SF1 Switzerland

== Books ==
- Singen? Kann Jeder! (Everyone can sing), Schwarzkopf & Schwarzkopf Verlag, 2005, ISBN 3-89602-680-1

== Discography ==
Released	Artist	Gounaki's Credits	Chart Position
2007	MusicStars	Take A Chance (single); vocal producer, vocal coach, arranger	CH No. 2
2007	MusicStars	Twelve (album); vocal coach, arranger	CH No. 6
2007	MusicStars	This Is Life (single); vocal producer, vocal coach, arranger	CH No. 5
2005	Nu Pagadi	Dying Words (single); vocal coach, arranger	GER No. 22
2004	Nu Pagadi	Your Dark Side (album); vocal coach, arranger	GER No. 1
2004	Nu Pagadi	Sweetest Poison (single); vocal coach, arranger	GER No. 1
2004	Preluders	Bal Privé (single); vocal coach, arranger	GER No. 28
2003	Hi-5	Mia Nichta San Kiafti (album); vocal coach, arranger, co-producer	GR No. 1
2003	Preluders	Girls in the House (album); vocal coach, arranger	GER No. 2
2003	Hi-5	Allo agapi allo sex (single); vocal coach, arranger, co-producer	GR No. 1
2003	Hi-5	Tichero Asteri (single); vocal coach, arranger, co-producer	GR No. 1
2003	Hi-5	M'ena Fili (single); vocal coach, arranger, co-producer	GR No. 1
2003	Preluders	Everyday Girl (single); vocal coach, arranger	GER No. 1
2003	Hi-5	Ksero ti zitao (single); vocal coach, arranger, co-producer	GR No. 1
2003	Hi-5	Hi-5 (album); vocal coach, arranger, co-producer	GR No. 1
2003	Guano Apes	Break the Line (single); vocal coach, arranger, co-producer	GER No. 45
2003	Guano Apes	Quietly (single); vocal coach, arranger, co-producer	GER No. 51
2003	Guano Apes	Pretty in Scarlet (single); vocal coach, arranger, co-producer	GER No. 51
2003	Guano Apes	Quietly (single); vocal coach, arranger, co-producer	GER No. 51
2003	Guano Apes	You Can't Stop Me (single); vocal coach, arranger, co-producer	GER No. 10
2002	Guano Apes	Walking on a Thin Line (album); vocal coach, arranger, co-producer	GER No. 1
2002	Bro'Sis	Peace Of Soul (single); vocal coach, arranger, co-producer	GER No. 3
2002	Bro'Sis	Do You (single); vocal coach, arranger	GER No. 3
2001	Bro'Sis	Never Forget (album); vocal coach, arranger	GER No. 1
2001	Bro'Sis	I Believe (single); vocal coach, arranger	GER No. 1
2001	Tears	En Rouge (album); vocal coach, arranger	CH No. 8
2001	Tears	M.U.S.I.C (single); vocal coach, arranger	CH No. 1
2001	Tears	Dreamin' (single); vocal coach, arranger	CH No. 9
2000	Guano Apes	Don't Give Me Names (album); vocal coach	GER No. 1
2000	Donots	What Happened to the 80ies (single); vocal coach	?
2000	Donots	Pocket Rock (album); vocal coach	?
1999	Illegal Aliens/ Marco Minnemann	Comfortably Homeless (album); vocals, composer, co-producer	?
1999	Illegal Aliens	International Telephone (album); vocals, composer, co-producer	?
1998	H-Blockx	Black Skies (single); vocal coach, writer	?
1998	H-Blockx	Fly Eyes (album); vocal coach, writer, vocals	GER No. 19
1997	Illegal Aliens/ Marco Minnemann	The Green Mindbomb (album); vocals, composer, co-producer	?
1997	Illegal Aliens	Time (album); vocals, composer, co-producer	?
1996	Illegal Aliens	Red Alibis (album); vocals, composer, co-producer	?
1996	Illegal Aliens	Thickness (album); vocals, composer, co-producer	?
1995	Freaky Fukin' Weirdoz	Culture Shock (album); vocals	?
1994	Freaky Fukin' Weirdoz	Mao Mak Maa (album); vocals	?
1994	Ecco Di Lorenzo & His Innersoul	'Innersoul (album); vocals	?

== Certifications ==
- 2010 – Platinum for Sportfreunde Stiller MTV Unplugged in New York (Album – the 14th best-selling album in Germany of 2009)
- 2004 – Gold for Nu Pagadi Your Dark Side (Album)
- 2004 – Gold for Nu Pagadi Sweetest Poison (Single)
- 2003 – Gold for Preluders Girls in the House (Album)
- 2003 – Gold for Preluders Everyday Girl (Single)
- 2003 – 3× Platinum for Hi-5 Hi-5 (Album)
- 2003 – 2× Platinum for Hi-5 Ksero ti zitao (Single)
- 2003 – Gold for Hi-5 Mia nihta san ki afti (Album)
- 2002 – Gold for Guano Apes Walking on a Thin Line (Album)
- 2001 – Platinum for Bro'Sis Never Forget (Album)
- 2001 – 2× Platinum for Bro'Sis I Believe (Single)
- 2000 – Gold for Guano Apes Don't Give Me Names (Album)
