= Lovex discography =

- Studio albums: 4
- Singles: 11
- Music videos: 5

This is a comprehensive listing of official releases by Lovex, a rock band from Tampere, Finland. Lovex has released four studio albums, 1 best of compilations, 11 singles, and 5 music videos on its record labels EMI and Gun Records.

== Albums ==
=== Studio albums ===
Year	Title	Chart positions						Sales and certifications
Year	Title	FI	GER	SUI	AUT	JPN	POL	Sales and certifications
2006	Divine Insanity: First studio album; Released: March 1, 2006	4	—	—	—	—	—	FI Sales: over 15,000 (gold)
2006	Divine Insanity Special Edition: Released; Released: November 8, 2006	—	—	—	—	—	—	
2007	Divine Insanity International Version: Special Edition; Released: February 16, 2007	—	20	—	47	—	—	
2008	Pretend Or Surrender: Second studio album; Released: April 30, 2008	12	—	—	—	—	—	
2011	Watch Out: Third studio album; Released: May 11, 2011	12	—	—	—	—	—	

== Singles ==
Year	Song	Chart positions							Album
Year	Song	FI	FI Download	GER	SUI	AUT	JPN	POL	Album
2005	"Bleeding"	2	—	—	—	—	—	—	Divine Insanity
2006	"Guardian Angel"	1	—	—	—	—	—	—	Divine Insanity
2006	"Remorse"	2	—	—	—	—	—	—	Divine Insanity
2006	"Die A Little More"	3	—	—	—	—	—	—	Divine Insanity
2006	"Bullet For The Pain" (promo)	—	—	—	—	—	—	—	Divine Insanity
2007	"Guardian Angel"	—	—	22	—	47	—	—	Divine Insanity International Version
2007	"Anyone, Anymore"	2	—	62	—	—	—	—	Divine Insanity International Version
2007	"Bullet For The Pain" (digital version)	—	—	—	—	—	—	—	Divine Insanity International Version
2008	"Take A Shot"	5	—	—	—	—	—	—	Pretend Or Surrender
2008	"Turn"	11	—	—	—	—	—	—	Pretend Or Surrender
2008	"Ordinary Day" (promo)	—	—	—	—	—	—	—	Pretend Or Surrender
2009	"Don't Let Me Fall" (digital version)	—	—	—	—	—	—	—	Non-Album Song
2011	"Slave for the Glory"	—	—	—	—	—	—	—	Watch Out!
2011	"U.S.A."	—	—	—	—	—	—	—	Watch Out!

== Music videos ==
Year	Title	Album	Director	Artist
2005	"Guardian Angel"	Divine Insanity	Stobe Harju	Lovex
2006	"Bullet For The Pain"	Divine Insanity	Jan-Niclas Jansson	Lovex
2007	"Anyone, Anymore"	Divine Insanity International Version	Stobe Harju	Lovex
2008	"Take A Shot"	Pretend Or Surrender	Pasi Takula	Lovex
2008	"Turn"	Pretend Or Surrender	Henrik Mennander	Lovex
2011	"Slave For The Glory"	Watch Out		Lovex
2011	"USA"	Watch Out		Lovex
