= The Signal (Sandra Nasić album) =

2007 album by Sandra Nasić

Studio album by Sandra Nasić
- Released: 16 October 2007
- Genre: Alternative rock; electronic rock; pop rock
- Label: GUN/Supersonic Records

Professional ratings
Review scores
Source	Rating
MetalRage	72% link

The Signal is the debut solo album by German singer Sandra Nasić, lead vocalist of the alternative rock band Guano Apes. Released in 2007, it peaked at No. 46 on the German charts. The songs on the album are mainly alternative rock, though they also contain pop and electronic elements.

== Track listing ==
All lyrics are written by Sandra Nasić

No.	Title	Lyrics	Music	Length
1.	"The Name of My Baby"	Sandra Nasić	Sandra Nasić	3:53
2.	"Sorry"	Sandra Nasić	Sandra Nasić	3:48
3.	"Right Lane"	Sandra Nasić	Sandra Nasić, Christian Neander	4:08
4.	"Fever"	Sandra Nasić	Sandra Nasić, Steve Lironi, Patrik Berger	3:23
5.	"Mecasanova (Yam Yam)"	Sandra Nasić	Sandra Nasić, Patrik Berger	3:57
6.	"Do It Again"	Sandra Nasić	Sandra Nasić, Daniel Björn Gibson	3:23
7.	"Stop the Crying"	Sandra Nasić	Sandra Nasić, Steve Lironi	3:32
8.	"Old Shack"	Sandra Nasić	Sandra Nasić	3:22
9.	"Big City"	Sandra Nasić	Sandra Nasić, Christian Neander	3:30
10.	"Perfume"	Sandra Nasić	Sandra Nasić, Steve Lironi	3:43
11.	"The Signal"	Sandra Nasić	Sandra Nasić	3:56
12.	"Counting Trees"	Sandra Nasić	Sandra Nasić	4:40
13.	"Ireen" (Only available on the limited enhanced version)
14.	"Fever (Video)" (Only available on the limited enhanced version)	Sandra Nasić	Sandra Nasić, Steve Lironi, Patrik Berger
15.	"The Name of My Baby (Video)" (Only available on the limited enhanced version)	Sandra Nasić	Sandra Nasić
Total length:				45:10

== Personnel ==
- Sandra Nasić – vocals, guitars, bass, keyboards
- Christian Neander, Godi Hildmann, Patrik Berger, Steve Lironi – guitars
- Martin Helms, Klaus Knapp, Steve Lironi, Patrik Berger, and Christian Neander – bass
- Patrik Berger and Oliver Pinelli – keyboards
- Nico Lipolis, Ged Lynch, Sebastian Forslund, and Reiner Hubert – drums
