= Don't Turn Your Back on Me =

Don't Turn Your Back on Me may refer to:

- Don't Turn Your Back on Me, an album by Jackie DeShannon, 1964
  - "Don't Turn Your Back on Me", a song by Jackie DeShannon, 1964
- "Don't Turn Your Back on Me", a song by Brother Cane from Brother Cane, 1993
- "Don't You Turn Your Back on Me", a single by Guano Apes 1999
- "Don't Turn Your Back on Me", a song by Hall & Oates from Our Kind of Soul, 2004

== See also ==
- "Don't Turn Your Back", a song by Tages, 1965
- "Turn Your Back", a song by Billy Talent, 2008
