= You Can't Stop Me =

You Can't Stop Me may refer to:

- "You Can't Stop Me" (song), a song by Guano Apes
- You Can't Stop Me (album), an album by Suicide Silence, or the title song

== See also ==
- "U Can't Stop Me", a song by Basement Jaxx from the album Remedy
- "I Can't Stop Me", a song by Twice
