= Rain (Guano Apes song) =

Single by Guano Apes

from the album Proud Like a God
- Released: January 15, 1998; May 4, 1998 (commercial)
- Recorded: 1997
- Genre: Alternative rock
- Length: 4:35
- Label: Supersonic
- Songwriter(s): Guano Apes
- Producer(s): Guano Apes, Wolfgang Stach

Guano Apes singles chronology
"Open Your Eyes" (1997)	"Rain" (1998)	"Lords of the Boards" (1998)

"Rain" is a 1997 song by Guano Apes. It was first released in January 1998 as a promotional single, but later had a full release in May 1998 as their second single from their debut album Proud Like a God. It is one of the songs by the band to have a softer sound, followed by "Don't You Turn Your Back on Me", "Living in a Lie", "Pretty in Scarlet" and "Quietly". The music video shows the band walking on a desert, looking for rain.

== Track listing ==
=== CD single ===
1. Rain (Edit) - 3:46
2. Maria (D+B Smooth Mix) - 5:26
3. 360° Aliendrop (Kaleve Mix) - 4:10*
4. Rain (Album Version) - 4:38

* "360° Aliendrop (Kaleve Mix)" is an electronica remix of the song "Lords of the Boards".

=== Promo single ===
1. Rain (Edit) - 3:46
2. 360° Aliendrop (Kaleve Mix) - 4:10
3. Rain (Album Version) - 4:38

== Charts ==
Chart	Peak position
Germany (Media Control Charts)	76
