= Oh What a Night (Guano Apes song) =

Single by Guano Apes

from the album Bel Air
- Released: March 18, 2011
- Recorded: 2011
- Genre: Alternative rock
- Length: 3:12
- Label: Columbia Records
- Songwriter: Guano Apes
- Producer: Guano Apes

Guano Apes singles chronology
"Break the Line" (2004)	"Oh What a Night" (2011)	"Sunday Lover" (2011)

Music video
- "Oh What a Night" on YouTube

"Oh What a Night" is a 2011 song by the Guano Apes and the first single from their fourth album, Bel Air. It was their first single released in seven years, following Break the Line in 2004. Oh What a Night was released on 18 March 2011 and peaked at No. 37 in Germany. AllMusic gave the song 3½ out of 5 stars. A music video was released on YouTube on 7 March 2011 and reached over 1 million views by 6 July. The video features the band playing in the city of Dubai as a solar eclipse occurs.

== Charts ==
Chart	Peak position
Germany	37
Switzerland	51
Austria	68
