= Pretty in Scarlet =

Single by Guano Apes

from the album Walking on a Thin Line
- Released: 23 April 2003
- Recorded: 2002
- Genre: Alternative rock, art rock
- Length: 4:06
- Label: Supersonic
- Songwriter(s): Guano Apes
- Producer(s): Guano Apes, Fabio Trentini

Guano Apes singles chronology
"You Can't Stop Me" (2002)	"Pretty in Scarlet" (2003)	"Quietly" (2003)

"Pretty in Scarlet" is a 2003 song by Guano Apes, released as the second single from their third album Walking on a Thin Line on 23 April 2003. The music video shows Sandra as a rich person who gets attraction from the other members in her mansion.

== Track listing ==
=== CD single ===
1. Pretty in Scarlet (Single Version) - 3:38
2. You Can't Stop Me (G-Ball Remix) - 4:58
3. Pretty in Storm (G-Ball Remix) - 3:46
4. Pretty in Scarlet (Album Version) -4:02

CD-ROM material

1. Pretty in Scarlet - 4:16
2. Pretty in Scarlet (Making Of) - 8:57

=== CD single 2 ===
1. Pretty in Scarlet (Single Version) - 3:38
2. You Can't Stop Me (G-Ball Remix) - 4:58
3. Pretty in Scarlet (Album Version) - 4:02

=== CD single 3 ===
1. Pretty in Scarlet (Single Version) - 3:39
2. You Can't Stop Me (G-Ball Remix) - 4:59
3. Pretty in Scarlet (Album Version) - 4:02

CD-ROM material

1. Pretty in Scarlet - 4:16
2. Pretty in Scarlet (Making Of) - 8:57

=== Promo single ===
1. Pretty In Scarlet (Radio Edit) - 3:39
2. Pretty In Scarlet (Album Version) - 4:07

== Charts ==
Chart	Peak position
Germany	51
Austria	55

== Credits ==
- Multimedia Part Concept & Design – Friedel Muders
- Composed By – Guano Apes
- Engineer – Clemens Matznick
- Lyrics By – Sandra Nasic
- Mixed By – Clemens Matznick
- Percussion – Roland Peil
- Producer – Fabio Trentini, Guano Apes
- Producer [Additional Vocal] – Artemis Gounaki, Sandra Nasic
