= Lost (T)apes =

Compilation album by Guano Apes
- Released: 4 December 2006
- Recorded: 1994–1995
- Genre: Alternative rock, nu metal
- Length: 39:23
- Label: Supersonic; GUN; BMG
- Producer: Fabio Trentini, Guano Apes

Guano Apes chronology
Planet of the Apes (2004)	Lost (T)apes (2006)	Bel Air (2011)

Lost (T)apes is a compilation album by German rock band Guano Apes featuring previously unreleased demos, originally recorded in 1994 and 1995. Half the demos were later re-recorded for all three Guano Apes albums, while six were left completely unreleased until this album.

A deluxe edition, titled The Best & The Lost (T)apes, also exists. Disc one is simply the standard edition of the Planet of the Apes compilation, and disc two is the Lost (T)apes album.

== Track listing ==
All lyrics are written by Sandra Nasić; all music is composed by Guano Apes.

No.	Title	Length
1.	"Your Song" (Unreleased)	2:30
2.	"Hanoi" (Demo Version of La Noix)	2:08
3.	"Maria" (Demo Version)	3:11
4.	"Diokhan" (Demo Version)	2:44
5.	"Open Your Eyes" (Demo Version)	3:26
6.	"Get Busy" (Demo Version)	2:51
7.	"Ignaz" (Demo Version of Suzie)	2:35
8.	"Rain" (Demo Version)	4:17
9.	"Wasserfliege" (Unreleased)	3:30
10.	"Come and Feel" (Unreleased)	4:37
11.	"Running Away" (Unreleased)	3:40
12.	"Dreamin" (Unreleased)	3:48
Total length:		49:45
