= Alien Boys =

German rock band

- Origin: Hamburg, Germany
- Genres: Grunge, doom metal, sludge metal
- Years active: 1987–1994
- Labels: Gun Records

Alien Boys were a German rock band from Hamburg. They formed in 1987 and were one of the first European grunge bands but also associated with the doom metal genre. After two independent albums and a lot of touring, especially in the United States, they got signed to Gun Records/BMG and released their third album, Doom Picnic, produced by grunge pioneer Jack Endino. After their fourth album, Nekropolis, the group disbanded in 1994. Andi Schmidt and Ronnie Henseler later formed The Punkles, in the 2000s Schmidt and Beege played together in the proto punk band Nixon Now.

== Members ==
- Andi Schmidt – vocals
- Ronnie Henseler – bass
- Tom Beege – guitar (died 2020)
- Peter Stein – drums

== Discography ==
=== Albums ===
- Lawmachine (1989 – Anaconda Records)
- The Seeds of Decay (1991 – Rave Records)
- Doom Picnic (1992 – Gun Records)
- Nekropolis (1993 – Gun Records)

=== EPs ===
- Doom Picnic (10" vinyl EP, 1992 – Rave Records)
- Live at CBGB's, New York '91 (EP 2014 – Rug-Rat Records)
