= Depressive Age =

- Also known as: Blackout (1984–1988); D-Age (1997–2001)
- Origin: Berlin, Germany
- Genres: Thrash metal, progressive metal
- Years active: 1988–2001, 2003–2005, 2014, 2022-Present
- Labels: GUN
- Members: Jan Lubitzki; Jochen Klemp; Peter "Brutus" Habermann; Mario Brause; Markus Marth
- Past members: Norbert Drescher; Ingo Grigoleit; Tim Schallenberg; Miles Stone; Neils Eberle

Depressive Age is a German thrash metal band from Berlin. The group released four studio albums throughout the 1990s before renaming themselves D-Age and disbanding in 2001.

== History ==
Depressive Age was founded under the name Blackout in 1984, with the band releasing one demo before changing their name to Depressive Age in 1988. The group released their first studio album, First Depression, in 1992. First Depression was followed by the albums Lying in Wait (1993), Symbols for the Blue Times (1994) and Electric Scum in 1996, the latter two of which showcased less thrash metal influences and included forays into alternative rock. In 1997, the band once again changed their name, this time to D-Age, releasing the extended play Smalltown Boy, which featured a cover of the Bronski Beat song of the same name, which had previously appeared on Electric Scum. 1999 saw the release of the compilation album From Depressive Age to D-Age, and in 2001, the band broke up. The band reunited in 2003 as Depressive Age, with vocalist Jan Lubitzki as the sole remaining member from the group's previous incarnation. Depressive Age broke up for a second time in 2004. In August 2022, a further reunion including concerts and a new album was announced for 2023. However, even though the band played a number of Festivals (e.g. Wacken Open Air and Rock Hard Festival) where they also performed new songs, a new album was not released in 2023.

== Discography ==
=== Studio albums ===
- First Depression (1992, GUN Records)
- Lying in Wait (1994, GUN Records)
- Symbols for the Blue Times (1994, GUN Records)
- Electric Scum (1996, GUN Records)

=== Extended plays ===
- Smalltown Boy (1997)

=== Compilations ===
- From Depressive Age to D-Age (1999)

== Members ==
=== Current lineup ===
- Jan Lubitzki - vocals (1984-2001, 2003–2005, 2014, 2022-present)
- Jochen Klemp - guitars (1984-2001, 2022-present)
- Peter “Brutus” Habermann - harsh vocals (1993 (session), 2022-present)
- Mario Brause - bass guitar (2022-present)
- Markus Marth - guitars (2022-present)

=== Former members ===
- Norbert Drescher - drums (1984-2001)
- Ingo Grigoleit - guitar (1990-1995)
- Tim Schallenberg - bass guitar (1984-1998, 2014) (died 2017)
- Miles Stone - bass guitar (2003-2004)
- Niels Eberle - drums (2003-2004)
