= Pretend or Surrender =

Studio album by Lovex
- Released: 30 April 2008
- Recorded: Inkfish Studio
- Genre: Alternative metal Glam metal
- Label: EMI in Finland and Japan, GUN Records in rest of Europe

Lovex chronology
Divine Insanity (2006)	Pretend or Surrender (2008)	Watch Out (2011)

Pretend Or Surrender is Finnish band Lovex's second studio album released on 30.04.2008 in Finland. Album contains for example the song Take A Shot.

It is rated a 3 out of 10 on Metal.de.

== Songs ==
1. "If She's Near"
2. "Turn"
3. "Take A Shot"
4. "Different Light"
5. "Writings On The Wall"
6. "Time And Time Again"
7. "Belong To No One"
8. "My Isolation"
9. "Rid Of Me"
10. "Ordinary Day"
11. "End Of The World"
12. "End Of The World (Outro)

There is also "Save Me" and "Love and Lust" on the Limited Edition of Pretend Or Surrender.

== Singles ==
- "Take a Shot" (27 February 2008)
- "Turn" (28 May 2008)

== Members ==
- Theon - vocals
- Vivian Sin'amor - guitar
- Sammy Black - guitar
- Jason - bass
- Julian Drain - drums
- Christian - piano
