= Divine Insanity =

- Divine Insanity cover

Studio album by Lovex
- Released: 1 March 2006
- Recorded: Deerhouse Studio Tampere, Finland
- Genre: Alternative metal Glam metal
- Length: 40:41
- Label: EMI in Finland and Japan, GUN Records in rest of Europe
- Producer: Jari Latomaa

Lovex chronology
Divine Insanity (2006)	Pretend or Surrender (2008)

Divine Insanity is Finnish band Lovex's first album, released in 2006. The album contains their hit song "Guardian Angel."

Divine Insanity has achieved gold status in Finland and found success in Germany, as well. A special edition of the album was released in Finland on 8 November 2006, and the International Version was released in Germany on 16 January, in Finland on 21 January, and in Japan on 19 September 2007.

== Track listing ==
1. "Bullet For The Pain" (Music & Lyrics by Lovex) – 3.31
2. "Guardian Angel" (Music & Lyrics by Lovex & Janne) – 3.54
3. "Oh How The Mighty Fall" (Music and Lyrics by Lovex) – 3.26
4. "Remorse" (Music & Lyrics by Lovex) – 4.36
5. "Bleeding" (Music by Lovex & Jussi, Lyrics by Lovex) – 3.46
6. "Wounds" (Music and Lyrics by Lovex) – 3.54
7. "Die A Little More" (Music by Lovex & Jussi, Lyrics by Lovex) – 3.25
8. "On The Sidelines" (Music and Lyrics by Lovex) – 4.10
9. "Halfway" (Music and Lyrics by Lovex) – 4.03
10. "Divine Insanity" (Music and Lyrics by Lovex) – 3.59
11. "Sleeptight" (Music and Lyrics by Lovex) – 1.49

=== Bonus songs on Special Edition ===
1. "Shout" (Music and Lyrics by Lovex) – 3.58
2. "Heart of Stone (demo 2004)" (Music and Lyrics by Lovex) – 4.56
3. "Guardian Angel (demo 2004)" (Music and Lyrics by Lovex & Janne) – 3.57
4. "Yours" (Music by Lovex & Jussi S., Lyrics by Lovex) – 5.07
5. "Runaway (live(cover, original version by Bon Jovi))" (Music and Lyrics by Bon Jovi & George Karakoglou) – 4.05
6. "Die A Little More (live)" (Music by Lovex & Jussi, Lyrics by Lovex) – 3.28
7. "Bullet For The Pain (live)" (Music and Lyrics by Lovex) – 3.42
8. "Bullet For The Pain (video)" (Nelivetotuotanto / Director Jan-Niclas Jansson)
9. "Guardian Angel (video)" (Nitro / Director Tuomas "Stobe" Harju)

Live-songs recorded at Espoo, Finland on 9 July 2006 by Marko Tetri and Henkka Wirsell.

=== International Version's bonus songs ===
1. "Anyone, Anymore" (Music & Lyrics by Lovex) – 3.00
2. "Shout" (Music & Lyrics by Lovex) – 3.58
3. "Yours" (Music by Lovex & Jussi S., Lyrics by Lovex) – 5.07

International Version DOESN'T contain the songs On The Sidelines and Sleeptight.

== Singles ==
- Bleeding (10.8.2005)
- Guardian Angel (1.2.2006 in Finland, 5 January 2007 in Germany, Austria and Switzerland)
- Remorse (9.8.2006)
- Die A Little More (9.8.2006)
- Bullet For The Pain (PROMO 2006)
- Anyone, Anymore (16 February 2007 in Germany, Austria and Switzerland, 21 February 2007 in Finland)

== Members ==
- Theone – vocals
- Vivian Sin'amor – guitar
- Sammy Black – guitar
- Jason – bass
- Julian Drain – drums
- Christian – piano

== Charts ==
Chart (2006)	Peak position
Finland	4
Chart (2007)	Peak position
Germany	20
Switzerland	47
