= Break the Line =

Single by Guano Apes

from the album Planet of the Apes
- Released: October 24, 2004
- Recorded: 2004
- Genre: Nu metal
- Label: Supersonic
- Songwriter: Guano Apes
- Producer: Guano Apes

Guano Apes singles chronology
"Quietly" (2003)	"Break the Line" (2004)	"Oh What a Night" (2011)

Music video
- "Break the Line" on YouTube

"Break the Line" is a 2004 song by the Guano Apes from their greatest hits album Planet of the Apes, released on October 24, 2004. It was one of the three new songs recorded for the album, however it was the only one that made it to the album, the two outtakes from the album "Stay" and "Underwear" instead became B-sides for the single. The music video shows the band performing in a room plus with some elements of split screen. It was the last single by the Guano Apes before their four-year hiatus beginning in 2005; their next single "Oh What a Night" was released in 2011.

== Track listing ==
=== CD single ===
1. Break the Line – 3:33
2. Scratch the Pitch (Live, recorded at Palladium, Cologne, 2 May 2003) – 3:33
3. Break the Line (G-Ball & Kaa Remix) – 3:47

=== CD single 2 ===
1. Break the Line – 3:33
2. Stay – 3:48
3. Underwear – 3:28
4. Scratch the Pitch (Live, recorded at Palladium, Cologne, 2 May 2003) – 3:33
5. Break the Line (G-Ball & Kaa Remix) – 3:47

== Charts ==
Chart	Peak position
Germany	45
