= Don't You Turn Your Back on Me =

Single by Guano Apes

from the album Meschugge soundtrack
- Released: March 8, 1999
- Recorded: 1998–1999
- Genre: Alternative rock
- Length: 3:34
- Label: Supersonic
- Songwriter(s): Guano Apes
- Producer(s): Guano Apes, Wolfgang Stach

Guano Apes singles chronology
"Lords of the Boards" (1998)	"Don't You Turn Your Back on Me" (1999)	"Big in Japan" (2000)

"Don't You Turn Your Back on Me" is the fourth single by Guano Apes. It was released to promote the film Meschugge in 1999. Despite the video's heavy rotation on various music channels, the single charted in their native Germany at number 50, which is one of the reasons the song was not included in their 2000 album Don't Give Me Names. The music video marked a new look for lead singer Sandra, who dyed her blonde hair jet black.

== Track listing ==
=== CD single ===
1. Don't You Turn Your Back On Me (Original) - 3:46
2. Don't You Turn Your Back On Me (Frozen-Mix) - 4:05
3. Don't You Turn Your Back On Me (String-Version) - 3:57
4. Don't You Turn Your Back On Me (Prince P.A.L.-Clubmix) - 3:46
5. Move a Little Closer - 2:48
6. Multimedia Track (CD-ROM only, contains multimedia part for PC and Mac with title track video, pictures, discography, film trailer and internet links. Music video remains exclusive for this single, as it contains excerpts from the film Meschugge, and is unavailable on any other band's releases.)

== Charts ==
Chart	Peak position
Germany (Media Control Charts)	50
