= No Speech =

Single by Guano Apes

from the album Don't Give Me Names
- Released: 14 June 2000
- Recorded: 1999
- Genre: Nu metal
- Length: 3:30
- Label: Supersonic
- Songwriter(s): Guano Apes
- Producer(s): Guano Apes, Wolfgang Stach, Fabio Trentini

Guano Apes singles chronology
"Big in Japan" (2000)	"No Speech" (2000)	"Living in a Lie" (2000)

"No Speech" is a 2000 song by German rock band Guano Apes. It was released their second single from their second album Don't Give Me Names on 14 June 2000. The music video was inspired by the movie Duel and shows the band performing inside a truck.

== Track listing ==
=== CD single ===
1. No Speech - 3:29
2. Open Your Eyes (Live at Viva Overdrive Studios, 14 April 2000) - 3:19
3. No Speech (Live at Viva Overdrive Studios, 14 April 2000) - 3:50

=== CD single 2 ===
1. No Speech - 3:29
2. Open Your Eyes (Live at Viva Overdrive Studios, 14 April 2000) - 3:19
3. Mine All Mine (Live at Viva Overdrive Studios, 14 April 2000) - 3:43
4. No Speech (Live at Viva Overdrive Studios, 14 April 2000) - 3:50

=== Promo single ===
1. No Speech - 3:29
2. Open Your Eyes (Live at Viva Overdrive Studios, 14 April 2000) - 3:19

=== Promo single 2 ===
1. No Speech - 3:29
2. Mine All Mine - 3:48
3. Ain't Got Time - 2:42

== Charts ==
Chart	Peak position
Germany (Media Control Charts)	75

== In popular culture ==
This song was present in the Rock 'n' Roller Coaster Starring Aerosmith queue soundtrack at Disneyland Paris.
