= Kumba Yo! =

Single by Guano Babes featuring Michael Mittermeier
- Released: March 26, 2001
- Recorded: 2001
- Genre: Comedy rock, rap rock, nu metal, rap metal
- Length: 4:02
- Label: Supersonic
- Songwriters: Guano Apes, Michael Mittermeier
- Producers: Guano Apes, Wolfgang Stach, Fabio Trentini

Guano Apes singles chronology
"Dödel Up" (2001)	"Kumba Yo!" (2001)	"You Can't Stop Me" (2002)

"Kumba Yo!" is a 2001 collaborative single by Guano Apes (credited as Guano Babes) featuring German comedian Michael Mittermeier. This song is notable for being the only Apes song to use profanity, with only one use of the word "fucking" in the song and serves as their highest-charting single in their native Germany. The song uses elements of the song "Kumbaya". The video shows the band capturing and tying Mittermeier to their car.

== Track listing ==
=== CD single ===
1. Kumba Yo! - 3:22
2. Kumba Yo! (Acoustic Version) - 3:16
3. Kumba Yo! (Easy Buzz Remix) - 2:55
4. Kumba Yo! (Karaoke Version) + Hidden Kumba - 4:56

== Charts ==
=== Weekly charts ===
Chart (2001)	Peak position
Austria (Ö3 Austria Top 40)	4
Germany (GfK)	3
Switzerland (Schweizer Hitparade)	12

=== Year-end charts ===
Chart (2001)	Position
Austria (Ö3 Austria Top 40)	39
Germany (Official German Charts)	22
Switzerland (Schweizer Hitparade)	92
