= Offline (album) =

Studio album by Guano Apes
- Released: 30 May 2014
- Studio: Toolhouse Studios (Rotenburg an der Fulda, Hesse); Tonstudio 45 (near Koblenz, Germany); FuzzFactory Tonstudio (Berlin-Kreuzberg, Germany); Transporterraum (Berlin, Germany); The Popchop Studios (Berlin, Germany); Katzbach Studio; Z-Muzic
- Genre: Alternative rock; pop rock
- Length: 38:30
- Label: Epic Records; Sony Music
- Producer: Guano Apes; Kurt Ebelhäuser; Philipp Hoppen; Kristian Nord; Robin Grubert; Mirco "Godi" Hildmann (co.); Simon Jäger (co.)

Guano Apes chronology
Bel Air (2011)	Offline (2014)

Singles from Offline
- 1. "Close to the Sun" Released: 28 February 2014

Professional ratings
Review scores
Source	Rating
laut.de	2/5 stars

Offline is the fifth studio album by the German rock band Guano Apes. It was released on 30 May 2014 by Epic Records/Sony Music labels.

== Background ==
Recording sessions took place at Toolhouse Studios in Rotenburg an der Fulda, at Tonstudio 45 near Koblenz, at FuzzFactory Tonstudio in Berlin-Kreuzberg, at Transporterraum and at Popchop Studios in Berlin, at Katzbach Studio and at Z-Muzic. Production was primarily handled by Kurt Ebelhäuser and Philipp Hoppen. The album peaked at #8 in Germany, at #26 in Austria and at #31 in Switzerland. Its lead single "Close to the Sun" made it to #86 on the German charts.

Musically, the album is a continuation of its predecessor Bel Air, featuring a more polished, pop-influenced sound compared to the funk-influenced nu metal of the band's first three albums. German dubstep artist Sola Plexus worked with the band on the song "Jiggle" and remixed "Cried All Out" for the German "exklusiv edition" of the album.

== Track listing ==
No.	Title	Lyrics	Music	Producer(s)	Length
1.	"Like Somebody"	Sandra Nasić	Dennis Poschwatta; Henning Rümenapp; Sandra Nasić; Stefan Ude	Guano Apes; Philipp "Philsen" Hoppen	4:53
2.	"Close to the Sun"	Sandra Nasić; Daniel Traynor; Jo Perry; Lindy Robbins	Poschwatta; Rümenapp; Nasić; Ude; Daniel Traynor; Jo Perry; Lindy Robbins	Guano Apes; Philipp "Philsen" Hoppen	3:42
3.	"Hey Last Beautiful"	Sandra Nasić	Poschwatta; Rümenapp; Nasić; Ude; Kurt Ebelhäuser	Guano Apes; Kurt Ebelhäuser	3:26
4.	"Numen"	Sandra Nasić	Poschwatta; Rümenapp; Nasić; Ude; Ebelhäuser	Guano Apes; Kurt Ebelhäuser	4:07
5.	"Cried All Out"	Sandra Nasić	Poschwatta; Rümenapp; Nasić; Ude; Ebelhäuser	Guano Apes; Kurt Ebelhäuser	4:07
6.	"It's Not Over"	Sandra Nasić; Robin Grubert	Poschwatta; Rümenapp; Nasić; Ude; Robin Grubert	Guano Apes; Philipp "Philsen" Hoppen; Kristian Nord; Robin Grubert	3:45
7.	"Water Wars"	Sandra Nasić	Poschwatta; Rümenapp; Nasić; Ude	Guano Apes; Philipp "Philsen" Hoppen	3:57
8.	"Fake"	Sandra Nasić	Poschwatta; Rümenapp; Nasić; Ude; Ebelhäuser	Guano Apes; Kurt Ebelhäuser	2:55
9.	"Jiggle" (featuring Sola Plexus)	Sandra Nasić; Jerome Vazhayil	Poschwatta; Rümenapp; Nasić; Ude; Ebelhäuser	Guano Apes; Kurt Ebelhäuser	3:37
10.	"The Long Way Home"	Sandra Nasić	Poschwatta; Rümenapp; Nasić; Ude; Ebelhäuser	Guano Apes; Kurt Ebelhäuser	4:00
Total length:					38:30

Bonus track on "Exklusiv Edition"
No.	Title	Length
11.	"Cried All Out" (Sola Plexus remix)	4:06

== Personnel ==
- Sandra Nasić – lyrics, vocals, vocal producer (tracks: 1–8, 10), producer
- Henning Rümenapp – guitar, producer
- Stefan Ude – bass, producer
- Dennis Poschwatta – drums, producer
- Daniel James Traynor – lyrics (track 2)
- Jo Perry – lyrics (track 2)
- Lindy Robbins – lyrics (track 2)
- Robin Grubert – lyrics & producer (track 6)
- Jerome Vazhayil – lyrics (track 9)
- Sola Plexus – vocal producer (track 9)
- Philipp "Philsen" Hoppen – producer & engineering (tracks: 1, 2, 6, 7)
- Kurt Ebelhäuser – producer & engineering (tracks: 3–5, 8–10)
- Kristian Nord – producer (track 6)
- Simon Jäger – co-producer (tracks: 3, 5, 8–10), engineering (tracks: 3–5, 8–10)
- Mirco 'Godi' Hildmann – co-producer (tracks: 4, 8, 9)
- Michael Tibes – engineering (tracks: 1, 2, 6, 7)
- Robert Stephenson – assistant engineering (tracks: 1, 2, 6, 7)
- Robin Schmidt – mastering
- Darcy Proper – mastering (track 2)
- Super An Der Spree – creative direction, artwork
- Julia Schliewe – additional artwork
- Jill Greenberg – cover
- Harry Weber – photography

== Charts ==
Chart (2014)	Peak position
Austrian Albums (Ö3 Austria)	26
German Albums (Offizielle Top 100)	8
Swiss Albums (Schweizer Hitparade)	31
