= Path (song) =

2001 single by Apocalyptica

- Cover of "Path Vol. 1 & 2"

Single by Apocalyptica

from the album Cult
- Released: 2000
- Genre: Cello rock
- Length: 3:06
- Songwriter(s): Eicca Toppinen

Apocalyptica singles chronology
"Harmageddon" (1998)	"Path" (2000)	"Hope Vol. 2" (2002)

"Path" is a song by Finnish symphonic metal band Apocalyptica and a single from their 2000 album Cult. It was originally released in 2000 as an instrumental which also has a music video. The release also included "Hall of Mountain King" from Cult, a cover of Edvard Grieg's, Peer Gynt, Op. 23, Act II, Pt. 5. In 2001, "Path Vol. 1 & 2" was released, where the original version was renamed "Path Vol. 1" and "Path Vol. 2" was added, a version with vocals sung and features Sandra Nasić.

== Track listing ==
Path
No.	Title	Length
1.	"Path"	3:06
2.	"Hall of Mountain King"	3.29

Path Vol. 1 & 2
No.	Title	Length
1.	"Path Vol. 2" (featuring Sandra Nasić)	3:24
2.	"Path Vol. 1"	3:06
3.	"Pray (Live)"	4:23
4.	"Romance (Live)"	3:44

== Charts ==
Chart	Peak position
Austria (Ö3 Austria Top 40)	58
Finland (Suomen virallinen lista)	4
Switzerland (Schweizer Hitparade)	100
