= Bel Air (album) =

Studio album by Guano Apes
- Released: 1 April 2011
- Recorded: 2009–2011
- Studio: Clouds Hill (Hamburg); Studio Freequence; Katzbach Studio
- Genre: Alternative rock
- Length: 35:58
- Label: Columbia
- Producer: Guano Apes; Jon Schumann

Guano Apes chronology
Lost (T)apes (2006)	Bel Air (2011)	Offline (2014)

Singles from Bel Air
- 1. "Oh What a Night" Released: 15 March 2011; 2. "Sunday Lover" Released: 8 July 2011; 3. "This Time" Released: 7 October 2011; 4. "When the Ships Arrive" Released: 23 April 2012

Professional ratings
Review scores
Source	Rating
AllMusic	3.5/5 stars
laut.de	2/5 stars
Metal.de	8/10

Bel Air is the fourth studio album by the German alternative rock band Guano Apes, and the first released after the band's reunion in 2009. It was released on 1 April 2011 on Columbia Europe, eight years after their previous album Walking on a Thin Line.

== Background ==
The album marked a notable change in style for Guano Apes, as it shows the band leaving their nu metal roots behind and incorporating elements of dance and pop music in their songs, with synthesizers and electronic drum loops fulfilling prominent roles in multiple songs.

Bel Air entered the German album charts at No. 1. Single "Oh What a Night" reached No. 37 on the German charts.

The album is available in four different editions: a standard edition (one disc), deluxe edition (one disc and poster), gold edition (two discs), and a vinyl edition (two records and poster).

== Music videos ==
Four music videos were filmed for songs off of Bel Air: "Oh What a Night", "Sunday Lover", "This Time" and "When the Ships Arrive".

== Track listing ==
All lyrics are written by Sandra Nasić.

No.	Title	Music	Length
1.	"Sunday Lover"	Guano Apes	3:58
2.	"Oh What a Night"	Guano Apes	3:12
3.	"When the Ships Arrive"	Guano Apes	4:05
4.	"This Time"	Guano Apes	3:51
5.	"She's a Killer"	Guano Apes	3:15
6.	"Tiger"	Guano Apes	2:33
7.	"Fanman"	Guano Apes	3:51
8.	"All I Wanna Do"	Guano Apes	3:05
9.	"Fire in Your Eyes"	Guano Apes	4:38
10.	"Trust"	Guano Apes	3:25
11.	"Fire" (appears on deluxe edition/gold edition)	Guano Apes	3:47
12.	"Carol and Shine" (appears on deluxe edition/gold edition)	Guano Apes	3:24
13.	"Running Out the Darkness" (appears on gold edition/vinyl)	Sandra Nasić	3:22
14.	"Staring at the Sun" (appears on gold edition/vinyl)	Guano Apes	3:11
Total length:			49:45

== Personnel ==
- Mastered by – Kai Blankenberg
- Mixed by – Arne Neurand (tracks: 5, 6, 8, 10 to 14), Randy Staub (tracks: 2), Terry Date (tracks: 7), Tom Lord-Alge (tracks: 1, 3, 4, 9)
- Produced by – Guano Apes, Jon Schumann

== Charts ==
=== Weekly charts ===
Chart (2011)	Peak position
Austrian Albums (Ö3 Austria)	5
German Albums (Offizielle Top 100)	1
Swiss Albums (Schweizer Hitparade)	2

=== Year-end charts ===
Chart (2011)	Position
German Albums (Offizielle Top 100)	53
Swiss Albums (Schweizer Hitparade)	71
