= Lovex =

Finnish rock band

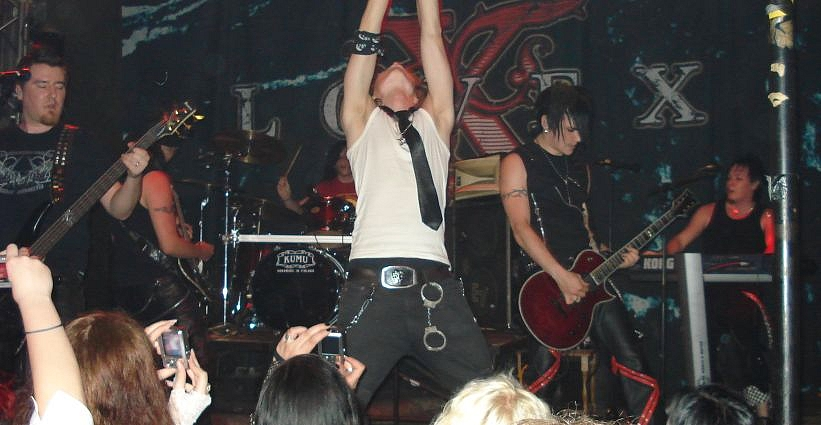
- Lovex (2008)

Background information
- Origin: Tampere, Finland
- Genres: Glam metal, glam rock
- Years active: 2001–2016
- Labels: EMI, GUN
- Members: Theon; Vivian Sin'amor; Sammy Black; Christian; Julian Drain; Jason
- Website: http://www.lovex.fi/

Lovex is a rock band from Tampere, Finland.

== History ==
Lovex started officially in 2001–2002, when several musicians who had previously played in other bands, decided to start their own band to play rock music and have fun.

By 2004 they had written and recorded a number of songs, and then received a record deal with EMI Finland. August 2005 saw the release of their first hit, "Bleeding". Their second single, "Guardian Angel" was released in January 2006 and became a huge hit in Finland. The band's first album, Divine Insanity, was also released in March 2006. In Germany, Switzerland and Austria, the single Guardian Angel was released on 5 January 2007, and album was released on 16 February 2007. Lovex released their album in Japan on 17 September 2007. Lovex gave a successful performance in the Eurovision song contest 2007 with their song Anyone, Anymore.

In January 2010, Lovex uploaded a demo called Marble Walls on their Myspace, off their upcoming third album. In the summer of 2010, Lovex started recording their third album, Watch Out!. On October 8, Vivian announced via Facebook that the album was ready, and all that needed to be done was the album cover. In early 2011, Lovex announced that Watch Out!'s release date was May 11. On April 5, the cover of Watch Out! was released. On April 14, Lovex released the video for "Slave For the Glory". Finally, on 11 May 2011, Lovex's third album, "Watch Out!" was released, and on the same day, the second single off the album came out, entitled, "U.S.A." The video for "U.S.A." was shot in the U.S. and in Finland. The video was released on 7 June 2011. In October 2011, the third single "Watch Out!" from the album of the same name was released.

In 2016, the band went on an indefinite hiatus.

== Members ==
- Theon McInsane (born Torsti Mäkinen, on 26 July 1982) – vocals
- Vivian Sin'Amor (born Risto Katajisto, on 8 September 1981) – guitar
- Sammy Black (born Sami Saarela, on 1 January 1982) – guitar
- Christian (born Teppo Toivonen, on 18 August 1983) – keyboards
- Julian Drain (born Juho Järvensivu, on 11 March 1988) – drums
- Jason (born Timo Karlsson, on 7 May 1982) – bass

All the band members have pseudonyms and do not use their real names.

== Discography ==
- Divine Insanity (2006)
- Pretend or Surrender (2008)
- Watch Out! (2011)
- State of Mind (2013)
- Dust to Diamonds (2016)
