= Watch Out! (Lovex album) =

Studio album by Lovex
- Released: 2011
- Label: EMI

Lovex chronology
Pretend Or Surrender (2008)	Watch Out! (2011)

Watch Out is Lovex's album released by EMI in Germany, the biggest music market in Europe. Album consist of ten songs which are written by: Christian, Theon, Vivian Sin'amor, M. Kaxe and Sammy Black. They have some new style of lyrics and playing. They also recorded new videos for songs: "U.S.A" and "Slave For The Glory". In "The Mill Sessions" they were performing "Marble Walls" and "Slave For The Glory".

== Track listing ==
Song	Written by
1. Queen of the Night	Christian and Vivian Sin'amor
2. U.S.A.	Christian and Theon
3. Slave For The Glory	Christian and Theon
4. Time Of Your Life	Christian and Theon
5. Watch Out!	Christian and M. Kaxe
6. 15 Minutes	Theon
7. Crash My World	Christian and M. Kaxe
8. Worlds Collide	Christian, Theon and Sammy Black
9. One	Christian and Theon
10. Marble Walls	Christian and Theon

=== Japanese edition bonus tracks ===
Song	Written by
1. U.S.A. feat. Miyavi	Christian, Theon and Miyavi
2. Without a Cause	?
3. Slave for the Glory (acoustic version)	Christian and Theon
