= Living in a Lie =

2000 single by Guano Apes

Single by Guano Apes

from the album Don't Give Me Names
- Released: 2 October 2000
- Recorded: 1999–2000
- Genre: Alternative rock
- Length: 4:33
- Label: Supersonic
- Songwriter(s): Guano Apes
- Producer(s): Guano Apes, Wolfgang Stach, Fabio Trentini

Guano Apes singles chronology
"No Speech" (2000)	"Living in a Lie" (2000)	"Dödel Up" (2001)

"Living in a Lie" is a 2000 song by German rock band Guano Apes from their second album Don't Give Me Names. It was released as the third single from the album on 2 October 2000. The music video shows Sandra singing in a room, interspersed by live and backstage footage of the band performing.

== Track listing ==
=== CD single ===
1. Living in a Lie - 3:38
2. Rain (Live @ Paradiso) - 5:04
3. Don't You Turn Your Back On Me - 3:44
4. Living in a Lie (Album Version) - 4:33

CD-ROM material

1. Impressions - 1:55
2. Hotel - 2:39
3. Canyon -2:31
4. Toilette - 0:36
5. Rain (Live Fragments) - 1:26
6. Interview (German) - 11:45
7. Interview (English) - 5:24
8. Living in a Lie - 3:39

=== Promo single ===
1. Living in a Lie (Radio Edit One) - 3:41
2. Living in a Lie (Radio Edit Two) - 3:20
3. Living in a Lie (Unplugged) - 4:27
4. Living in a Lie (Album Version) - 4:33

== Charts ==
Chart	Peak position
Germany	84
Netherlands	97
