= Proud Like a God =

1997 studio album by Guano Apes

Studio album by Guano Apes
- Released: 6 October 1997
- Recorded: 1996–1997
- Studio: Horus-Sound-Studio, Hannover, Germany; Wisseloord Studios, Hilversum, The Netherlands
- Genre: Alternative rock; alternative metal; nu metal; funk metal
- Length: 51:45
- Label: Supersonic; BMG
- Producer: Wolfgang Stach; Guano Apes

Guano Apes chronology
Proud Like a God (1997)	Don't Give Me Names (2000)

Singles from Proud Like a God
- 1. "Open Your Eyes" Released: 25 August 1997; 2. "Rain" Released: 15 January 1998; 3. "Lords of the Boards" Released: 15 July 1998

Proud Like a God is the debut studio album by the German alternative rock band Guano Apes. The album was released in Germany on 6 October 1997 via GUN/Supersonic Records, internationally on 24 December 1997 via GUN/Supersonic and BMG International, and finally in the US on 28 September 1999 via RCA Records and BMG International. Two of Guano Apes' most popular and enduring songs are included on this album: "Open Your Eyes" and "Lords of the Boards", which peaked at #5 and #10 on the German charts, respectively.

The album has been certified Platinum for shipping 200,000 copies in both Germany and Switzerland.

== Background ==
After winning the "Local Heroes" talent contest in 1996, Guano Apes entered Horus Studio in Hannover to record their debut album, and signed a record deal with GUN Records, a division of BMG. In the 2005 documentary Planet of the Apes, drummer Dennis Poschwatta called the recording process "a really bad experience", since the band hadn't realized that recording an album is substantially different from performing live. Vocalist Sandra Nasić, on the other hand, found working in the studio "interesting" and remembered how it made her feel respected as a singer, while guitarist Henning Rümenapp described it as "on-the-job training".

In August 1997, "Open Your Eyes" was released as a single, followed in 1998 by "Rain" and "Lords of the Boards". "Lords of the Boards" was not included in the first edition of the album, as it was written after the album was ready for release. Proud Like a God was re-released in early 1998 with "Lords of the Boards" on the tracklist. Also, "Suzie" and the hidden track "Move a Little Closer" were excluded from the US editions of the album for unknown reasons.

== Reception ==
Professional ratings
Review scores
Source	Rating
AllMusic	3/5 stars
RockHard	7.5/10

CMJ gave a favourable review, praising Sandra Nasić's vocal range and calling the album a "well-blended mix of sweet pop and bruising rock, with a little bit of electronica-informed loops and ambience thrown in for good measure."

== Track listing ==
All tracks are written by Guano Apes.

No.	Title	Length
1.	"Open Your Eyes"	3:08
2.	"Maria"	3:46
3.	"Rain"	4:37
4.	"Crossing the Deadline"	3:25
5.	"We Use the Pain"	2:32
6.	"Never Born"	5:17
7.	"Wash It Down"	3:06
8.	"Scapegoat"	3:22
9.	"Get Busy"	3:23
10.	"Suzie"	2:55
11.	"Tribute"	9:11
17.	"Move a Little Closer (Note: Tracks 12 to 16 are silent and each 4 seconds in length. Track 17 is a hidden bonus track)"	2:48
Total length:		47:50

Reissue
No.	Title	Length
1.	"Open Your Eyes"	3:09
2.	"Maria"	3:47
3.	"Rain"	4:35
4.	"Lords of the Boards"	3:42
5.	"Crossing the Deadline"	3:25
6.	"We Use the Pain"	2:32
7.	"Never Born"	5:17
8.	"Wash It Down"	3:06
9.	"Scapegoat"	3:22
10.	"Get Busy"	3:25
11.	"Suzie"	2:53
12.	"Tribute"	9:14
18.	"Move a Little Closer (Note: Tracks 13 to 17 are silent and each 4 seconds in length. Track 18 is a hidden bonus track. Tracks 13 to 18 are not contained on promotional releases.)"	2:50
Total length:		51:37

US edition
No.	Title	Length
1.	"Open Your Eyes"	3:09
2.	"Maria"	3:47
3.	"Rain"	4:35
4.	"Lords of the Boards"	3:42
5.	"Crossing the Deadline"	3:25
6.	"We Use the Pain"	2:32
7.	"Never Born"	5:17
8.	"Wash It Down"	3:06
9.	"Scapegoat"	3:22
10.	"Get Busy"	3:25
11.	"Tribute"	9:14
12.	"Open Your Eyes" (live video)
Total length:		45:34

Limited edition bonus disc
No.	Title	Length
1.	"Maria" (live at Melkweg, Amsterdam)	4:07
2.	"Rain" (live at Melkweg, Amsterdam)	4:40
3.	"Lords of the Boards" (live at Melkweg, Amsterdam)	3:42
4.	"Crossing the Deadline" (live at Melkweg, Amsterdam)	3:21
5.	"Get Busy" (live at Melkweg, Amsterdam)	3:24
Total length:		19:12

=== 20th Anniversary Edition ===
Proud Like a God XX
- Artwork for Proud Like A God XX

Studio album
- Released: October 2017

Professional ratings
Review scores
Source	Rating
laut.de	4/5 stars
metal.de	9/10

October 2017 saw the release of Proud Like a God XX, a revamped 2CD version of the original album containing remixed versions of 10 songs ("Scapegoat" and "Tribute" were omitted entirely), plus the previously unreleased track "Score". The second disc contains thoroughly rearranged "2017 versions" of six songs from Proud Like A God, and three newly recorded cover songs. The track "Lose Yourself" was released as a single.

Proud Like a God XX 20th Anniversary Deluxe Edition (Disc 1)
No.	Title	Length
1.	"Open Your Eyes" (2017 mix)	3:09
2.	"Maria" (2017 mix)	3:43
3.	"Rain" (2017 mix)	4:36
4.	"Lords of the Boards" (Remastered)	3:43
5.	"Crossing the Deadline" (2017 mix)	3:24
6.	"We Use the Pain" (2017 mix)	2:30
7.	"Never Born" (2017 mix)	5:18
8.	"Wash It Down" (2017 mix)	3:05
9.	"Get Busy" (2017 mix)	3:27
10.	"Suzie" (2017 mix)	2:53
11.	"Score" (2017 mix)	2:30
Total length:		38:23

Proud Like a God XX 20th Anniversary Deluxe Edition (Disc 2)
No.	Title	Length
1.	"Open Your Eyes" (2017 version; featuring Danko Jones)	3:04
2.	"Lose Yourself" (Eminem cover)	2:50
3.	"Rain" (2017 version)	4:29
4.	"Crossing the Deadline" (2017 version)	2:35
5.	"This is Not America" (Pat Metheny Group & David Bowie cover)	2:41
6.	"Never Born" (2017 version)	2:56
7.	"Precious" (Depeche Mode cover)	3:47
8.	"Suzie" (2017 version)	2:40
9.	"Get Busy" (2017 version)	3:11
Total length:		28:20

== Personnel ==
=== Band ===
- Sandra Nasić – vocals
- Henning Rümenapp – guitars
- Stefan Ude – bass
- Dennis Poschwatta – drums, vocals

=== Additional musicians ===
- Afam – scratches
- Geo Schaller – keys, programming
- Smoke – cello
- Michael Wolpers – percussion

=== Production ===
- Wolfgang Stach – production (except "Lords of the Boards"), engineering
- Guano Apes – production ("Lords of the Boards")
- Ronald Prent – mixing
- Anyway Wölfle – additional engineering

== Charts ==
Single	Year	Chart	Position
"Open Your Eyes"	1997	Germany	5
"Open Your Eyes"	1997	Austria	10
"Open Your Eyes"	1997	Switzerland	11
"Open Your Eyes"	1997	Netherlands	19
"Open Your Eyes"	1997	Belgium	14
"Open Your Eyes"	1997	Italy	8
"Open Your Eyes"	2000	US Mainstream Rock Tracks	24

=== Year-end charts ===
Chart (1998)	Position
German Albums Chart	13
Chart (1999)	Position
German Albums Chart	30

== Certifications ==
Region	Certification	Certified units/sales
Austria (IFPI Austria)	Gold	25,000^{*}
Belgium (BRMA)	Gold	25,000^{*}
Germany (BVMI)	Platinum	600,000
Italy (FIMI)	Gold	50,000^{*}
Netherlands (NVPI)	Gold	50,000^{^}
Poland (ZPAV)	Gold	50,000^{*}
Switzerland (IFPI Switzerland)	Platinum	50,000^{^}
United States	—	80,000
Summaries
Europe (IFPI)	Platinum	1,000,000^{*}
^{*} Sales figures based on certification alone.^{^} Shipments figures based on certification alone.
