= Walking on a Thin Line =

Studio album by Guano Apes
- Released: 3 February 2003
- Recorded: 2001–2002
- Studio: Area 51 Recording Studios (Celle, Germany); Studios 301 (Cologne, Germany); Horus Sound Studio (Hannover, Germany); Home Studios (Hamburg, Germany)
- Genre: Alternative rock; nu metal
- Length: 44:29 (standard edition); 51:49 (digipak version)
- Label: Supersonic; GUN; BMG
- Producer: Fabio Trentini; Guano Apes; Artemis Gounaki

Guano Apes chronology
Don't Give Me Names (2000)	Walking on a Thin Line (2003)	Live (2003)

Singles from Walking on a Thin Line
- 1. "You Can't Stop Me" Released: 9 December 2002; 2. "Pretty in Scarlet" Released: 23 April 2003; 3. "Quietly" Released: 23 July 2003

Professional ratings
Review scores
Source	Rating
laut.de	2/5 stars
RockHard	8.5/10

Walking on a Thin Line is the third studio album by German rock band Guano Apes. It was released on 3 February 2003 by BMG. Title of the album comes from a line in the song "Kiss the Dawn".

The album reached #1 on the German album charts and was certified gold for shipping 100,000 copies. Lead single "You Can't Stop Me" peaked at #10 in Germany.

== Background ==
Recording Walking on a Thin Line went slow and was delayed multiple times. In the 2005 documentary Planet of the Apes, Dennis Poschwatta said that the band "made the mistake of going [into the studio] with unfinished songs. That’s why it took a year to write and create this record." At the time of the release of "You Can't Stop Me" it was still unclear what the album title would be. Despite all that, Sandra Nasić called the album her favorite, saying she considered it "the most mature thing [Guano Apes had] done" and that they'd "essentially achieved what [she] was aiming for".

"Diokhan" is one of the oldest songs on the album: a demo version of this song was recorded as early as 1994, and was later included on the compilation album Lost (T)apes.

== Track listing ==
No.	Title	Length
1.	"You Can't Stop Me"	3:11
2.	"Dick"	2:43
3.	"Kiss the Dawn"	5:20
4.	"Pretty in Scarlet"	4:07
5.	"Diokhan"	3:34
6.	"Electric Nights" (bonus track on digipak version)	3:26
7.	"Quietly"	3:38
8.	"High"	3:24
9.	"Sing That Song"	3:03
10.	"Scratch the Pitch"	3:47
11.	"Plastic Mouth"	4:04
12.	"Counting the Days" (bonus track on digipak version)	3:39
13.	"Storm"	3:47
14.	"Sugar Skin"	4:13

== Personnel ==
- Sandra Nasić – vocals
- Henning Rümenapp – guitars
- Stefan Ude – bass
- Dennis Poschwatta – drums, vocals

=== Additional musicians ===
- Roland Peil – percussion

=== Credits ===
- Artwork – Friedel Muders
- Engineer, mixing – Clemens Matznick
- Additional engineers – Ben Hertel, Jan Helle, Philsen Hoppen, Tom Fein
- Drumcare engineer – Rossi Rossberg
- Mastering – Ian Cooper
- Photography – Dirk Schelpmeier
- Producer – Fabio Trentini, Guano Apes
- Additional vocal production producer – Artemis Gounaki, Sandra Nasić
- Programming – Dirk Riegner, G-Ball

== Charts ==
=== Weekly charts ===
Chart (2003)	Peak position
Austrian Albums (Ö3 Austria)	5
Dutch Albums (Album Top 100)	18
Finnish Albums (Suomen virallinen lista)	9
French Albums (SNEP)	123
German Albums (Offizielle Top 100)	1
Italian Albums (FIMI)	28
Portuguese Albums (AFP)	16
Swiss Albums (Schweizer Hitparade)	8

=== Year-end charts ===
Chart (2003)	Position
German Albums (Offizielle Top 100)	35

== Certifications ==
Certifications for Walking on a Thin Line
Region	Certification	Certified units/sales
Germany (BVMI)	Gold	100,000^{^}
Portugal (AFP)	Silver	10,000^{^}
^{^} Shipments figures based on certification alone.
