= IO (German band) =

German alternative rock band

- Origin: Göttingen, Germany
- Genres: Alternative metal; alternative rock
- Years active: 2006–present
- Labels: Rocker Team Records
- Members: Charles Simmons; Dennis Poschwatta; Henning Rümenapp; Stefan Ude
- Website: http://www.io-rocks.com

IO (pronounced the English way 'eye-oh', as opposed to the German way 'ee-oh') is a German alternative rock band, formed in 2006 after the breakup of Guano Apes. Original Guano Apes members Henning Rümenapp (guitar), Stefan Ude (bass) and Dennis Poschwatta (drums) reunited after having spent time on individual projects - of which Poschwatta's band Tamoto was the only real band, as well as the most successful. IO was then completed by adding American singer Charles Simmons to the lineup.

The band released their debut album For The Masses on August 1, 2008, and toured several times, but was put on hold after Guano Apes reunited in 2009. As stated in the news section of IO's website, the band members "don't quite know yet" what consequences the Guano Apes reunion will have for IO.

== Discography ==
- 2008 - For the Masses

| No. | Title | Length |
|---|---|---|
| 1. | "Say Something" | 3:28 |
| 2. | "Don't Mean Nothing" | 3:08 |
| 3. | "In You" | 3:29 |
| 4. | "Attention" | 3:36 |
| 5. | "Stupid People" | 3:04 |
| 6. | "Mind Game" | 3:14 |
| 7. | "Fight Back" | 3:47 |
| 8. | "Stand My Ground" | 3:31 |
| 9. | "Rage" | 4:19 |
| 10. | "The Last To Know" | 3:44 |
| 11. | "Legacy" | 3:42 |
| 12. | "When I Fall" | 3:56 |
| Total length: | | 42:58 |
