= Quietly (song) =

2002 single by Guano Apes

Single by Guano Apes

from the album Walking on a Thin Line
- Released: July 21, 2003
- Recorded: 2002
- Genre: Alternative rock
- Length: 3:37
- Label: Supersonic
- Songwriter: Guano Apes
- Producers: Guano Apes, Fabio Trentini

Guano Apes singles chronology
| "Pretty in Scarlet" (2003) | "Quietly" (2003) | "Break the Line" (2004) |

Music video
- "Quietly" on YouTube

"Quietly" is the third and final single from the Guano Apes third album, Walking on a Thin Line. Like the previous single, Pretty in Scarlet, it charted at No. 51 in Germany. The single contains two previously unreleased songs, "Cream Over Moon" and "Allies", as well as previously unreleased live versions of "You Can't Stop Me" and "Pretty In Scarlet". It also contains an internet link giving exclusive access to the music video, a 'making of' feature for the music video, band members' statements and a live recording of Quietly. Rock Hard magazine called the song an incredibly gripping ballad.

The music video shows the band performing in a field during the day. Once night falls, explosions and bursts of flame surround the band as they perform. Footage of the band playing is intercut with shots of Sandra Nasić walking near a cliff and through the field in a white dress.

== Track listing ==
| No. | Title | Length |
|---|---|---|
| 1. | "Quietly" | 3:36 |
| 2. | "Cream Over Moon" | 3:40 |
| 3. | "Allies" | 3:08 |
| 4. | "You Can't Stop Me (Live)" | 3:18 |
| 5. | "Pretty in Scarlet (Live)" | 4:01 |

== Charts ==
| Chart | Peak position |
|---|---|
| Germany | 51 |
| Austria | 52 |
