= Dödel Up =

2001 single by Guano Apes

Single by Guano Apes

from the album Don't Give Me Names
- Released: 29 January 2001
- Recorded: 1999–2000
- Genre: Nu metal, funk metal
- Length: 3:38
- Label: Supersonic
- Songwriter: Guano Apes
- Producers: Guano Apes, Wolfgang Stach, Fabio Trentini

Guano Apes singles chronology
"Living in a Lie" (2000)	"Dödel Up" (2001)	"Kumba Yo!" (2001)

Music video
- "Dödel Up" on YouTube

"Dödel Up" is a 2000 song by Guano Apes. It is the fourth and final single from Don't Give Me Names, released on 29 January 2001 in Germany. Originally the post-grunge-influenced "I Want It" was going to be the fourth single as there was a video, however the band scrapped the video and chose to do "Dödel Up" instead. The music video for the single was a complete departure from the previous Apes music videos, as the video was purely animated, but blended with live footage. The video shows the band portrayed as half bodied pencil holders.

== Track listing ==
=== CD single ===
1. Dödel Up (Single Edit) - 3:23
2. Cuts - 3:34
3. Candy Love - 3:33
4. Dödel Up (Kuklicz Mix) - 4:16
5. Dödel Up (Album Version) - 3:38
6. Multimedia Part (CD-ROM only, contains video for title track, sketches for video, early acoustic live version and weblinks)

=== Promo single ===
1. Dödel Up (Album Version) - 3:37
2. Dödel Up (U.S. Mix) - 3:36

=== Airplay single ===
1. Dödel Up (Single Edit) - 3:23
2. Dödel Up (Album Version) - 3:38

== Charts ==
Chart	Peak position
Germany (Media Control Charts)	57
