= Don't Give Me Names =

Studio album by Guano Apes
- Released: 2 May 2000
- Recorded: 1999–2000
- Studios: Vox-Klangstudio (Bendestorf, Germany); Horus-Sound-Studio (Hanover, Germany); Galaxy Studios (Mol, Belgium)
- Genres: Alternative rock, alternative metal, nu metal, funk metal
- Length: 45:09 (standard edition); 57:27 (digipak version)
- Labels: Supersonic; GUN; BMG
- Producers: Wolfgang Stach; Fabio Trentini; Guano Apes

Guano Apes chronology
Proud Like a God (1997)	Don't Give Me Names (2000)	Walking on a Thin Line (2003)

Singles from Don't Give Me Names
- 1. "Big in Japan" Released: 20 March 2000; 2. "No Speech" Released: 14 June 2000; 3. "Living in a Lie" Released: 2 October 2000; 4. "Dödel Up" Released: 29 January 2001

Professional ratings
Review scores
Source	Rating
Blabbermouth.net	9/10
laut.de	5/5 stars
RockHard	9/10

Don't Give Me Names is the second studio album by the German rock band Guano Apes, released in 2000. It includes the hit single "Big in Japan" (a cover of the Alphaville song), which peaked at #9 on the German charts and remains one of Guano Apes' most popular songs.

The album was certified gold in Germany and in Switzerland.

== Background ==
After the success of their debut album Proud Like a God, the members of Guano Apes felt pressed to come up with a new album that could hold its own against its predecessor, and spent a lot of time on writing and demoing new songs. According to Dennis Poschwatta in the 2005 documentary Planet of the Apes, the band was determined "not to let anybody trick [them]. The album had to be awesome. It had to be out of sight."

Recording for Don't Give Me Names began in October 1999 and was done at three different studios: Horus Studio in Hanover, Vox Klangstudio in Bendestorf, and Galaxy Studios in Mol, Belgium. Wanting to achieve maximum result, the band tried to handle as much tasks as possible themselves, with the working process soon becoming chaotic, costly and time-consuming. Henning Rümenapp related how, eventually, producers Fabio Trentini and Wolfgang Stach were instrumental in "[getting] us all into the groove, bringing four oddballs together and focusing our ideas."

A number of songs featured on Don't Give Me Names, including "Innocent Greed", "I Want It" and "Dödel Up", had already been performed live by the band by the time they were recorded, with a few of them dating back to the period before the release of Proud Like a God. "Big in Japan", the first single, was initially recorded for a compilation album called Pop 2000, released to celebrate 50 years of German pop and rock music. The band originally intended to include "Don't You Turn Your Back on Me" (released as a standalone single in March 1999) on the album as well, but eventually decided against it due to the song's low chart ratings and overall fan feedback.

Four tracks from Don't Give Me Names were released as singles: "Big in Japan", "No Speech", "Living in a Lie" and "Dödel Up".

== Track listing ==
All tracks are written by Guano Apes, except "Big in Japan", written by Marian Gold, Bernhard Lloyd and Frank Mertens.

No.	Title	Length
1.	"Innocent Greed"	3:52
2.	"No Speech"	3:30
3.	"Big in Japan" (Alphaville cover)	2:49
4.	"Money & Milk"	2:39
5.	"Living in a Lie"	4:33
6.	"Dödel Up"	3:38
7.	"I Want It"	3:19
8.	"Heaven"	4:59
9.	"Mine All Mine"	3:49
10.	"Too Close to Leave"	3:33
11.	"Gogan"	2:48
12.	"Anne Claire"	5:42
Total length:		45:09

- European and Japanese editions contain "Big in Japan" music video.

Japanese bonus track
No.	Title	Length
13.	"Open Your Eyes" (live)	3:21
Total length:		48:30

Super audio CD bonus track
No.	Title	Length
13.	"Ain't Got Time"	2:42
Total length:		47:51

Bonus tracks on digipak version
No.	Title	Length
13.	"Ain't Got Time"	2:43
14.	"Living in a Lie" (unplugged)	4:27
15.	"Anne Claire" (unplugged)	5:09
Total length:		57:27

== Personnel ==
- Sandra Nasić – vocals
- Henning Rümenapp – guitars
- Stefan Ude – bass
- Dennis Poschwatta – drums, vocals

=== Additional musicians ===
- Marc Steylaerts – violin
- Veronique Gilis – violin
- Marc Tooten – viola
- Hans Vandaele – cello
- Alberto Manzanedo Alvarez – flamenco guitar, palmas on "Mine All Mine"
- Michael Wolpers – percussion
- Dra Diarra – percussion on "Dödel Up"
- Dirk Riegner – samples, programming
- Christian Wolff – string arrangements
- Markus Stollenwerk – string conductor

=== Other staff ===
- Gert Jacobs – engineer, mixing, mixing assistant
- Bob Ludwig – mastering
- Clemens Matznick – engineer
- Friedel Muders – artwork, mastering, design coordinator
- Ronald Prent – mixing
- Dirk Riegner – programming, sampling
- Dirk Schelpmeier – photography
- Wolfgang Stach – producer, engineer
- Fabio Trentini – producer

== Charts ==
=== Weekly charts ===
Chart (2000)	Peak position
Austrian Albums (Ö3 Austria)	1
Belgian Albums (Ultratop Flanders)	13
Dutch Albums (Album Top 100)	27
Finnish Albums (Suomen virallinen lista)	14
German Albums (Offizielle Top 100)	1
Hungarian Albums (MAHASZ)	12
Italian Albums (FIMI)	19
Portuguese Albums (AFP)	1
Swiss Albums (Schweizer Hitparade)	5

=== Year-end charts ===
Chart (2000)	Position
Austrian Albums (Ö3 Austria)	38
German Albums (Offizielle Top 100)	32
Swiss Albums (Schweizer Hitparade)	93

== Certifications ==
Region	Certification	Certified units/sales
Germany (BVMI)	Gold	150,000^{^}
Switzerland (IFPI Switzerland)	Gold	25,000^{^}
^{^} Shipments figures based on certification alone.
