= Lords of the Boards =

1997 single by Guano Apes

Single by Guano Apes

from the album Proud Like a God
- Language: English
- Released: July 15, 1998; September 20, 1999 (reissue)
- Recorded: 1997
- Genre: Nu metal; funk metal; rap metal
- Length: 3:45
- Label: Supersonic
- Songwriter: Guano Apes
- Producers: Guano Apes, Wolfgang Stach

Guano Apes singles chronology
"Rain" (1998)	"Lords of the Boards" (1998)	"Don't You Turn Your Back on Me" (1999)

Music video
- "Lords of the Boards" on YouTube

"Lords of the Boards" is the third single by the Guano Apes and the final single from their debut album Proud Like a God. The song reached number 10 in both Germany and Austria, and was certified gold in Germany in 1999. The song was commissioned for the 1998 European Snowboarding Championship.

== Music videos ==
There are two official music videos for the song. One is compiled from footage of the Guano Apes performing live at several locations, and the other shows the Guano Apes performing in a ski lodge, mixed with footage of them at a ski field as well as snowboarding clips.

== Track listing ==
No.	Title	Length
1.	"Lords of the Boards"	3:43
2.	"Crossing the Deadline" (Live in Stuttgart)	3:25
3.	"Suzie" (Live in Stuttgart)	3:22

== Charts ==
=== Weekly charts ===
Chart (1997–1999)	Peak position
Austria (Ö3 Austria Top 40)	10
Belgium (Ultratop 50 Flanders)	11
Netherlands (Single Top 100)	80
Germany (GfK)	10
Switzerland (Schweizer Hitparade)	34

=== Year-end charts ===
Chart (1998)	Position
Germany (Official German Charts)	80
Chart (1999)	Position
Germany (Official German Charts)	59
