= Michael Mittermeier =

German comedian

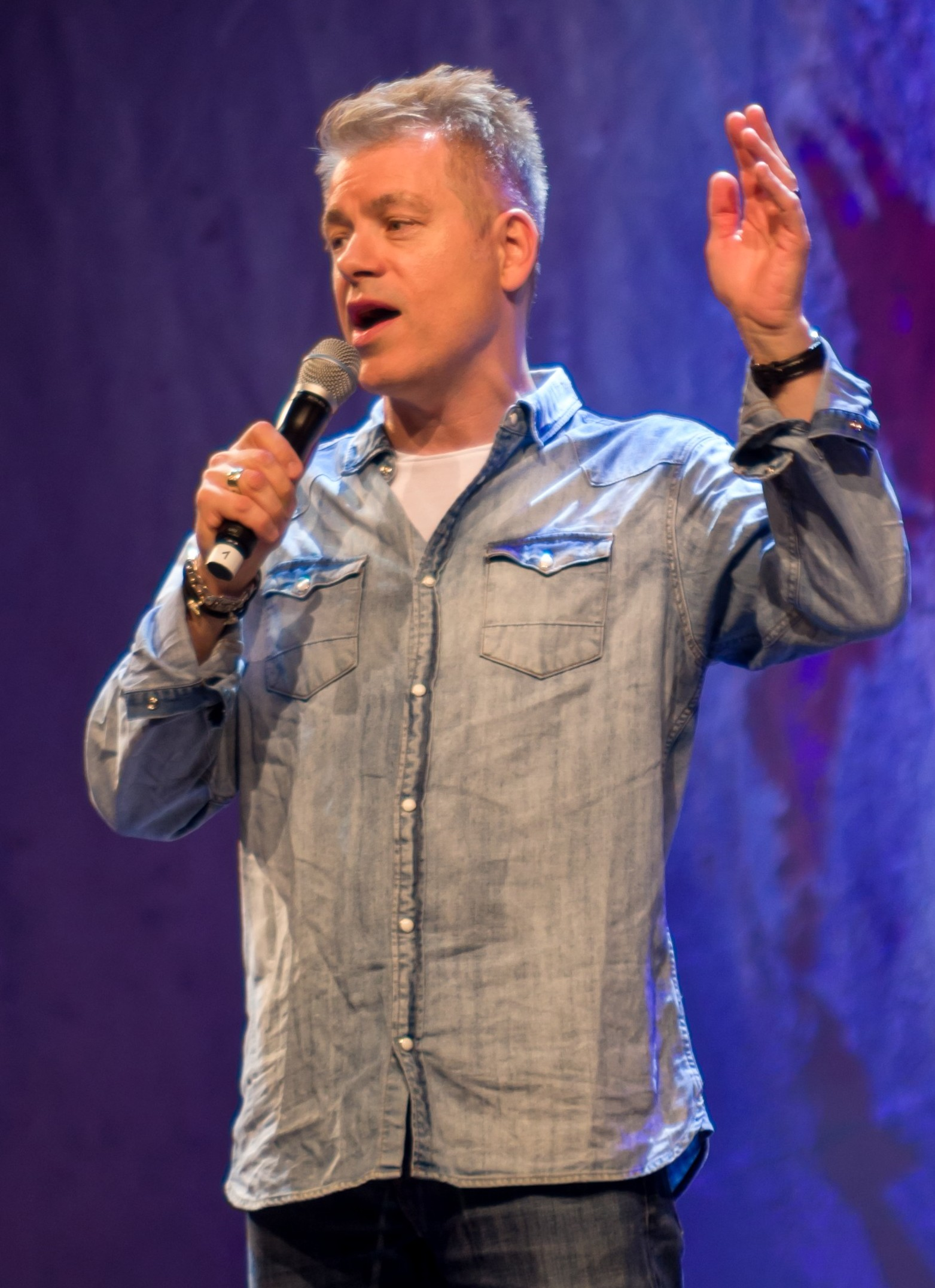
Mittermeier at Zelt-Musik-Festival 2017 in Freiburg

Michael Fritz Mittermeier (born 3 April 1966) is a German comedian.

== Early life ==
Mittermeier was born in Dorfen, Upper Bavaria. During his childhood he lived in Bavaria. After school he studied theatre.

== Career ==
In 1996, Mittermeier started the comedy program Zapped. Zapped was shown on his tours in Germany, Austria and Switzerland. He participated in comedy television shows as well as the German TV show Wetten, dass..?. The most well-known parts of Zapped are parodies of German advertisements as well as the US television series MacGyver, which later became a running gag. Mittermeier popularized the term "Arschgeweih" for Lower-back tattoo ("tramp stamp"; literally "ass antler"). His next comedy programs were Wahnsinnlich (1990), Zapped! (1999), Back to Life (2002), Paranoid (2004), Safari (2007) and Achtung, Baby! (2010).

In 1998, Mittermeier published Im Rausch der Kanäle together with Thomas Hermanns and Gudrun Allwang. In 2010, he published Achtung, Baby!

In 2001, he was featured in the music video for the Guano Apes (credited here as the Guano Babes) song, "Kumba Yo".

Mittermeier was also involved in the 2010 documentary This Prison Where I Live, featuring the Burmese comedian Zarganar who was imprisoned by his country's military junta for lampooning and criticizing them.

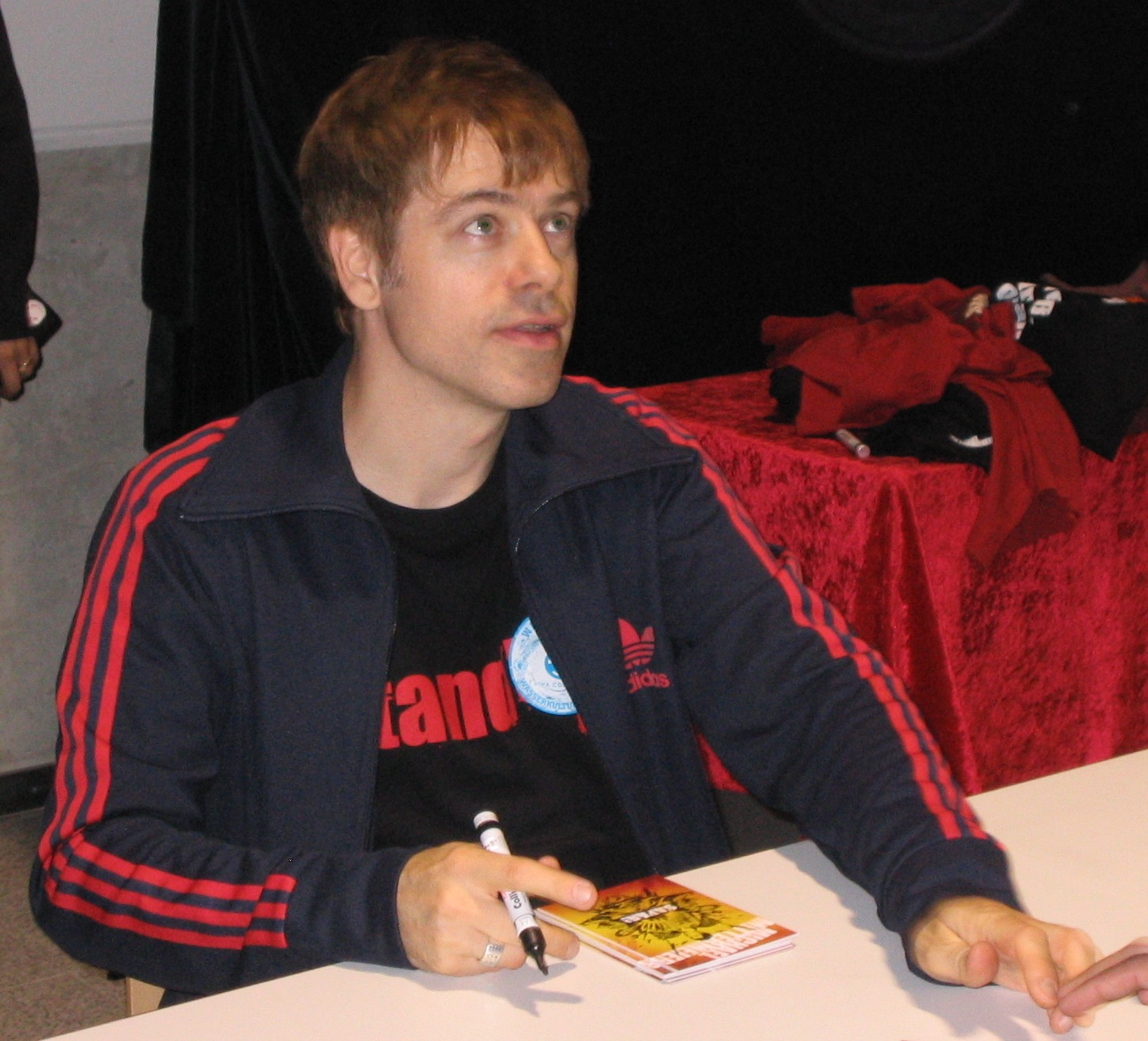
Mittermeier in 2007

In 2012, Mittermeier performed his English-language show A German on Safari in New York, London, and at the Edinburgh Fringe.

== Personal life ==
Mittermeier married singer Gudrun Allwang in 1998.

Having been born (and brought up) in Bavaria, Mittermeier has been a lifelong fan of the football team Bayern Munich.

== Awards ==
- Grazer Kleinkunstvogel
  - 1988
- Prix Pantheon
  - 1996: Publikumspreis Beklatscht & Ausgebuht
- Goldene Europa
  - 1998: Category Comedy
- Deutscher Comedypreis
  - 1999: Best Comedian (Publikumspreis)
  - 2000: Best Comedian (Publikumspreis)
  - 2002: Best Live-Comedy for „Back to life“
  - 2004: Best Live-Comedy
  - 2008: Best Comedian
- Eins Live Krone (WDR)
  - 2000: Best Comedian
  - 2001: Best Comedian
- Echo
  - 2001: Category Comedy
- Schneestern von Arosa
  - 2000
- Zeck-Kabarettpreis
  - 2005: Award
