= Open Your Eyes (Guano Apes song) =

1997 single by Guano Apes

"Open your Eyes"

Single by Guano Apes

from the album Proud Like a God
- Language: English
- B-side: "We Use the Pain"; "Wash It Down"
- Released: 25 August 1997
- Recorded: 1996
- Genre: Nu metal
- Length: 3:09
- Label: GUN/Supersonic
- Songwriter: Guano Apes
- Producers: Guano Apes, Wolfgang Stach

Guano Apes singles chronology
"Open your Eyes" (1997)	"Rain" (1998)

Music video
- "Open Your Eyes" on YouTube

"Open Your Eyes" is the debut single of the Guano Apes released in 1997.

== Chart performance ==
"Open Your Eyes" reached No. 5 in Germany, remaining in the Top 100 for 30 weeks. It won the "Local Heroes" competition held by VIVA, beating over 1000 competitors. Due to VIVA's heavy rotation of the music video, the Guano Apes signed a deal with Gun Records, which released their debut album Proud Like a God in 1997. Steve Huey's AllMusic review of Proud Like a God called the song one of the album's "strong moments". In 1999, the single was certified gold in Germany.

== Music video ==
The music video features the Guano Apes playing the song in a hotel lobby, empty except for several bored staff, indifferent to and sometimes vacuuming around them.

== Track listing ==
No.	Title	Length
1.	"Open Your Eyes"	3:08
2.	"We Use the Pain"	2:32
3.	"Wash It Down"	3:06

== Charts ==
=== Weekly charts ===
Chart (1997–2000)	Peak Position
Austria (Ö3 Austria Top 40)	10
Belgium (Ultratop 50 Flanders)	14
Germany (GfK)	5
Netherlands (Dutch Top 40)	18
Netherlands (Single Top 100)	19
Switzerland (Schweizer Hitparade)	11
US Mainstream Rock (Billboard)	24

=== Year-end charts ===
Chart (1998)	Position
Germany (Official German Charts)	33
Chart (1999)	Position
Belgium (Ultratop Flanders)	70
Netherlands (Dutch Top 40)	112
Netherlands (Single Top 100)	100

* American debut single, released in 2000.
