= You Can't Stop Me (song) =

Single by Guano Apes

from the album Walking on a Thin Line
- Released: 9 December 2002 (radio airplay); 13 January 2003 (CD single)
- Recorded: 2002
- Genre: Alternative metal, nu metal
- Length: 3:08 (Single Mix); 3:11 (Album version)
- Label: Supersonic
- Songwriter: Guano Apes
- Producers: Guano Apes, Fabio Trentini

Guano Apes singles chronology
"Kumba Yo!" (2001)	"You Can't Stop Me" (2002)	"Pretty in Scarlet" (2003)

Music video
- "You Can't Stop Me" on YouTube

"You Can't Stop Me" is the first single from the Guano Apes' third album, Walking on a Thin Line. It was released as a single on 13 January 2003, at which point the album it would appear on was still untitled. It reached No. 10 in Germany, also charting in four other European countries, and performing well in Portugal. It was their first single released in the United Kingdom. The song would later also appear on the 2004 greatest hits album, Planet of the Apes.

== Reception ==
Rock Hard magazine gave favourable reviews, calling it a great rock song that should dominate the rock scene. Despite the favourable reviews, Rock Hard stated the highlight of the five-track single was actually the song "Scratch The Pitch", describing it as rousing and deeply emotional, and noting a strong vocal performance by Sandra Nasić, commenting that it was probably the result of professional vocal coaching.

== Music video ==
The video was filmed in December 2002 and debuted on the Guano Apes official website on 19 December. The video shows the band performing in a circus ring. Band member Dennis Poschwatta can be seen knife throwing in the video, Henning Rümenapp breathes fire and the video ends with Stefan Ude's body being dragged off after he dives into the ground from the top of the circus tent. The video was filmed at the William Circus in Berlin. An elephant from a different circus was arranged to perform in the music video. Unknown to the band, the two circus families had a strong rivalry. The William family protested the arrival of the other circus owner, who replied by threatening the Williams with physical violence. There were fears the entire shoot would be cancelled due to the escalating situation; however, the elephant was eventually taken away and its role in the video was cancelled.

== Track listing ==
No.	Title	Length
1.	"You Can't Stop Me (Single Mix)"	3:08
2.	"Dick"	2:43
3.	"Scratch the Pitch"	3:48
4.	"Plastic Mouth (G-Ball & Kaa Mix)"	4:05
5.	"Trumpet Song"	2:54

== Charts ==
Chart	Peak position
Germany	10
Austria	15
Switzerland	69
Netherlands	65
Belgium	19
United Kingdom	99
