= Sandra Nasić =

German singer (born 1976)

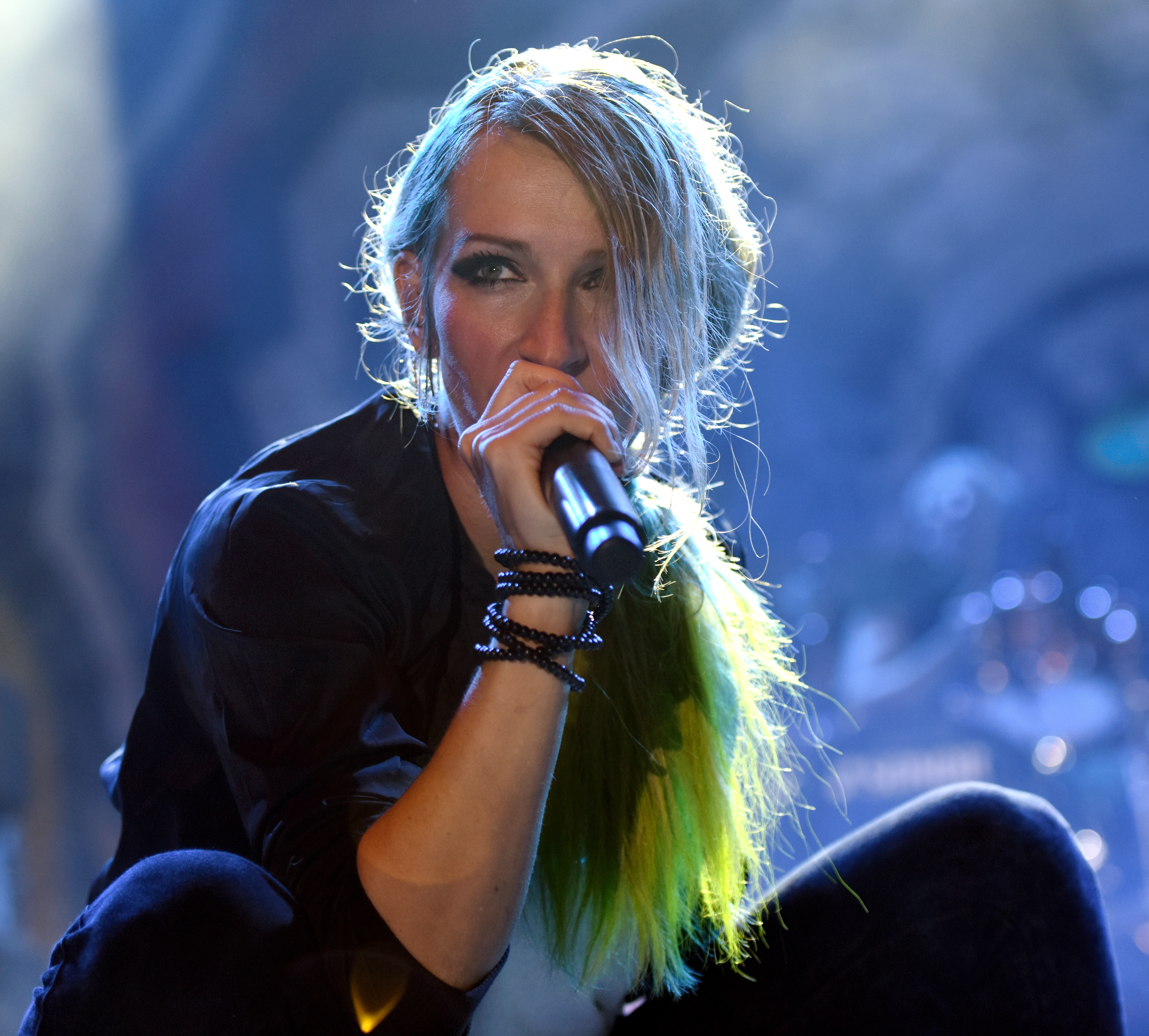
- Nasić performing with Guano Apes in 2015

Background information
- Born: 25 May 1976 (age 50); Göttingen, West Germany
- Genres: Alternative rock; alternative metal; nu metal
- Occupation: Singer
- Years active: 1994–present
- Member of: Guano Apes

Sandra Nasić (born 25 May 1976) is a German singer best known as the vocalist of the rock band Guano Apes.

== Career ==
Nasić was born in Göttingen, West Germany, where she grew up with her Croatian mother and sister. After she received her high school diploma, Nasić considered studying design, but decided to pursue a music career with the rock band Guano Apes, which she joined in 1994. The band's career took off in 1996 after they won the "Local Heroes" competition held by VIVA, beating out over 1,000 competitors with their song "Open Your Eyes". The band's debut album, Proud Like a God, peaked at No. 4 in Germany in 1997. Their next two albums, Don't Give Me Names (2000) and Walking on a Thin Line (2003) both reached No. 1. Guano Apes broke up in February 2005, but reunited in 2009. They went on to release two more albums, Bel Air (2011) and Offline (2014).

Whilst still with Guano Apes, Nasić appeared on Apocalyptica's 2001 single "Path Vol. 2", which reached No. 4 in Finland, and on DJ Tomekk's 2003 single Beat of Life (along with Ice-T and Trigga tha Gambla), which reached No. 12 in Germany.

During the Guano Apes hiatus, Nasić released her first solo recording, the single "Fever", which peaked at No. 64 in Germany. Her debut album, The Signal, peaked at No. 46.

From August until November 2012, Nasić was on the jury of the third season of X Factor, along with Sarah Connor, H.P. Baxxter, and Moses Pelham.

== Discography ==
=== Solo ===
- The Signal (2007)

=== with Guano Apes ===
- Proud Like a God (1997)
- Don't Give Me Names (2000)
- Walking on a Thin Line (2003)
- Bel Air (2011)
- Offline (2014)

=== with New Rock Conference ===
- "Heal Yourself" (single, 2000)

=== with Apocalyptica ===
- "Path Vol. 2" (2000)

=== with Dj Tomekk ===
- "Beat of Life" (single, 2002)

=== with T. Raumschmiere ===
- "A Very Loud Lullaby" (single, 2005)
