= Guano Apes =

German rock band

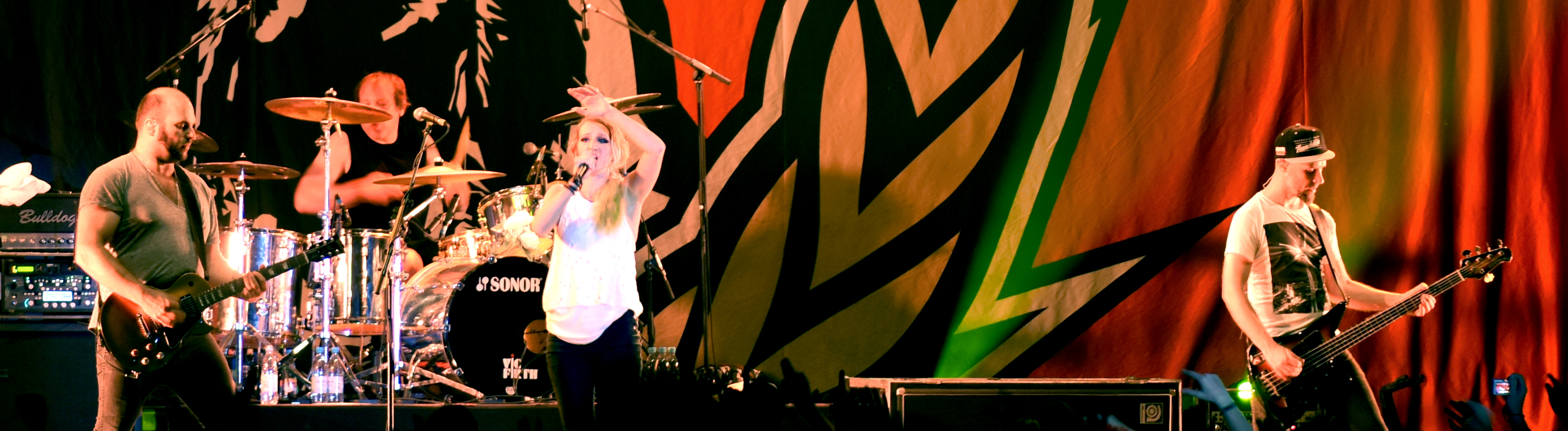
- Guano Apes performing in 2015

Background information
- Origin: Göttingen, Germany
- Genres: Alternative rock; nu metal
- Years active: 1994–2006, 2009–present
- Labels: GUN/Supersonic; Columbia Europe
- Members: Sandra Nasić; Henning Rümenapp; Stefan Ude; Dennis Poschwatta
- Website: guanoapes.org

Guano Apes is a German rock band formed in 1994 in Göttingen. The band consists of Sandra Nasić (vocals), Henning Rümenapp (guitars, backing vocals), Stefan Ude (bass, backing vocals), and Dennis Poschwatta (drums, backing vocals).

AllMusic calls the quartet alt-rock and their sound a fusion of metal, pop, and rap. They have released five studio albums, one live album, two compilation albums, and five video albums.

== History ==
=== Formation and Proud Like a God (1994–1999) ===
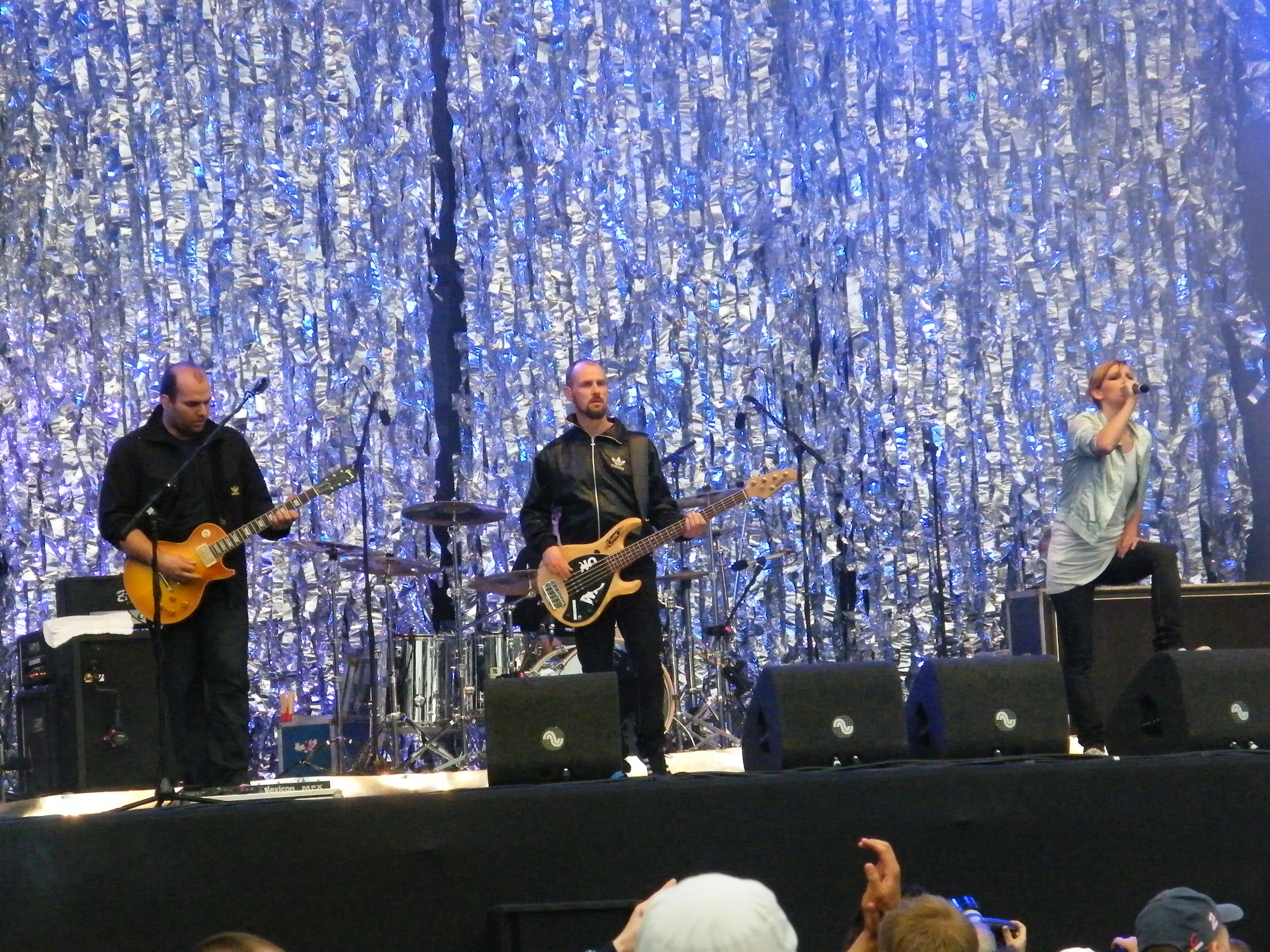
Guano Apes on stage in the Netherlands, 2009

Guano Apes was formed in 1994 in Göttingen, Germany, by guitarist Henning Rümenapp, bassist Stefan Ude, and drummer Dennis Poschwatta. Female lead singer Sandra Nasić joined the band later that same year.

"Open Your Eyes"
Sample from their first single

The band's career took off in 1996 after they won the "Local Heroes" competition held by VIVA, beating out over 1,000 competitors with their song "Open Your Eyes". The song was their first and most successful single, followed by the release in October 1997 of their debut album Proud Like a God on BMG and GUN/Supersonic Records. The album peaked at number 4 in Germany and was certified platinum. The songs "Lords of the Boards" and "Rain" were also issued as singles, with the former being specifically commissioned for the 1998 European Snowboarding Championship.

The release of their debut album was followed by an 18-month tour of Europe and the United States. "Open Your Eyes" appeared in the Warren Miller movie Fifty (1999) and Crusty 2000: The Metal Millennium (2000). The non-album single "Don't You Turn Your Back On Me" was contributed to the Meschugge film soundtrack in 1999.

=== Don't Give Me Names and Walking on a Thin Line (2000–2005) ===
In November 2000, Guano Apes released their second studio album, Don't Give Me Names, on BMG and GUN/Supersonic Records. The songs "Big in Japan", "No Speech", "Living in a Lie", and "Dödel Up" were issued as singles. "Big in Japan" (an Alphaville cover) and "No Speech" received a lot of airplay and the album was certified gold in Germany. A concert at Paradiso, Amsterdam was filmed and released on VHS and DVD, also called Don't Give Me Names.

In 2001, Guano Apes collaborated with German comedian Michael Mittermeier on the song "Kumba Yo!", which reached No. 3 on the German charts. Also, Sandra Nasić contributed vocals and lyrics to the song "Path Vol. 2" by Finnish cello quartet Apocalyptica.

Guano Apes' third studio album, Walking on a Thin Line, was released in March 2003 on BMG and GUN/Supersonic Records. It reached number one on the German album charts and, just like its predecessor, was certified Gold. The album was supported by the singles "You Can't Stop Me", "Pretty in Scarlet", and "Quietly".

In November 2003, Guano Apes released the album Live, which was recorded during a concert in Cologne earlier that same year. The limited edition contained a DVD with video footage of the entire concert.

In November 2004, the best of album Planet of the Apes was released, which included the new single "Break the Line". A DVD by the same name was released in February 2005, containing a documentary, concert footage, and several music videos, among other things.

=== Breakup and new projects (2005–2009) ===
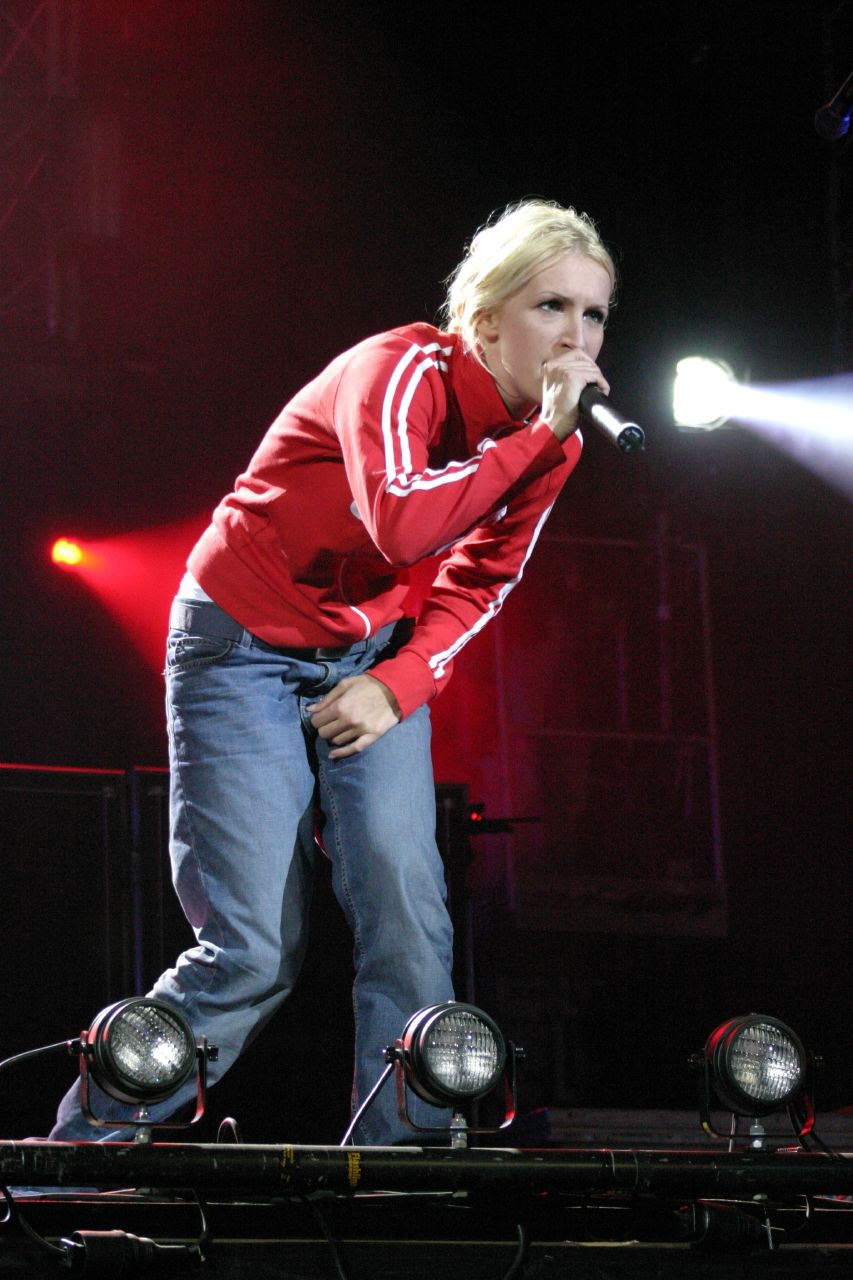
Sandra Nasić in 2003

Due to escalating personal differences among members, Guano Apes planned a farewell tour in February 2005 and subsequently disbanded. Dennis Poschwatta gave more details on the reason for their breakup in an interview:

"Basically, it was all about money. That is the most common problem that bands break up over. If someone thinks he is a born rock star or whatever, if you just lose your footing - that's what I could call it now. It was also not possible to bring Sandra back down to earth. And if your environment and lawyers encourage stupid opinions or actions, it becomes difficult. It's like a marriage or a relationship - at some point there's a fight, then it just doesn't work anymore."

Poschwatta subsequently focused on his band Tamoto, in which he played guitar (and drums while in the studio) and shared vocal duties with Markus Gumball, a.k.a. G-Ball. Tamoto released the album Clemenza in August 2005, which was supported by the singles "Beware" and "On My Mind". Stefan Ude and Henning Rümenapp were among the musicians who participated in the recording of the album. In 2007, Tamoto released the mini album Crudezza.

In 2006, Rümenapp, Ude, and Poschwatta formed a new band named IO, together with American singer Charles Simmons. IO went on the road several times and released their debut album, For the Masses, on 1 August 2008. The project was put on hold after Guano Apes reunited in 2009.

In December 2006, GUN Records released the compilation album Lost (T)apes, which contains a selection of previously unreleased demo tracks recorded in 1994 and 1995. Lost (T)apes was also released as part of the 2CD package The Best and the Lost (T)apes.

In October 2007, Nasić released a solo album titled The Signal.

=== Reunion and Bel Air (2009–2014) ===
In 2009, Guano Apes reunited and played a string of concerts in Europe, starting in Sofia, Bulgaria, and also including Braga, Portugal, Nickelsdorf, Austria, Przystanek Woodstock, Poland, and Rock im Park, Germany, and Bucharest, Romania. In Bucharest, the band announced they were working on a new album.

In April 2011, the group released their fourth studio album, Bel Air, on Columbia Europe. The album entered the German album charts at number one. They released four singles from this record: "Oh, What a Night", "Sunday Lover", "This Time", and "When the Ships Arrive".

Sony Music released the DVD Live @ Rockpalast in 2012. It contains footage of two concerts from 1997 and 2011, both recorded for the long-running German TV show Rockpalast.

=== Offline and Proud Like a God XX (2014–2017) ===
On 28 February 2014, Guano Apes released their first single in two years, titled "Close to the Sun", as well as a teaser trailer for their fifth album, titled Offline, and confirmed that the record would be released on 2 May 2014. A music video for "Close to the Sun" was released on 2 April. Later that month, it was announced that the release of Offline had been pushed back to 30 May.

To celebrate the 20th anniversary of Proud Like a God, Guano Apes released Proud Like a God XX on 6 October 2017. The album contains newly mixed versions of ten songs that appeared on the original album, plus the previously unreleased track "Score". The deluxe edition comes with a bonus CD containing reworked "2017 versions" of six songs from Proud Like a God (with a guest appearance by Danko Jones on the 2017 version of Open Your Eyes), as well as three cover songs, including the first single, "Lose Yourself" (originally performed by Eminem). Music videos for "Lose Yourself" and the 2017 version of "Suzie" were released on 6 October and 10 November 2017, respectively.

== Members ==
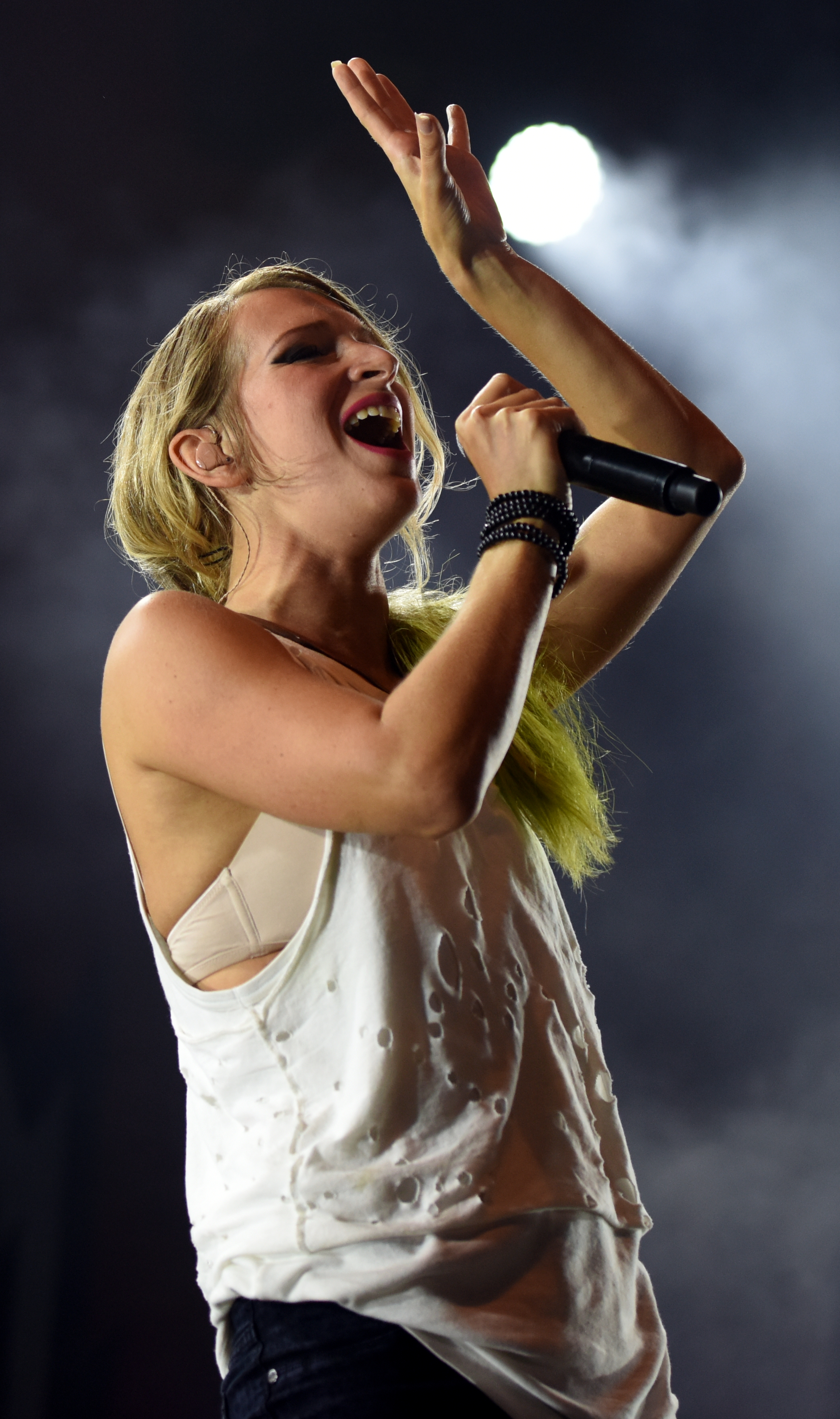
Sandra Nasić – lead vocals

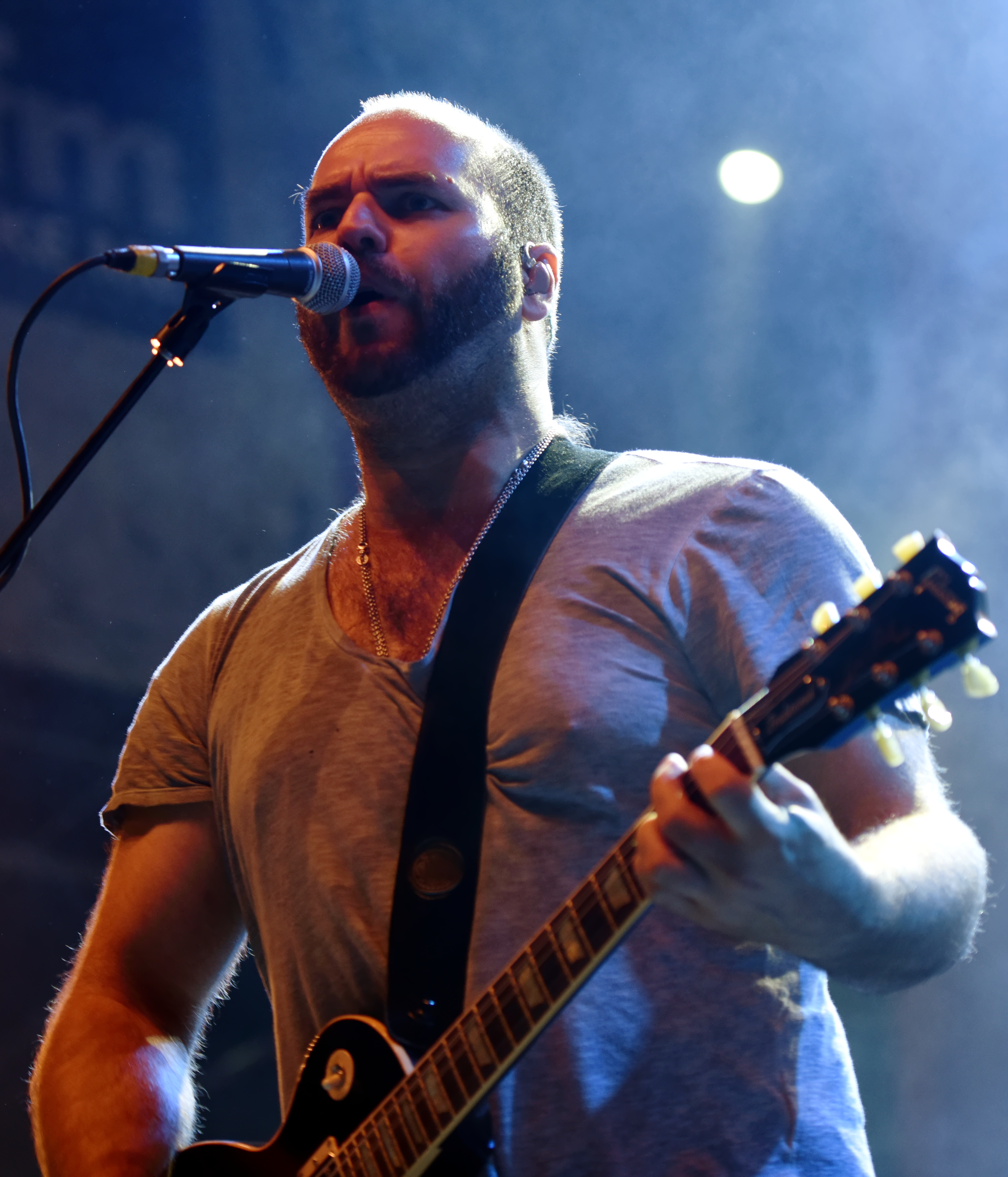
Henning Rümenapp – guitars, backing vocals

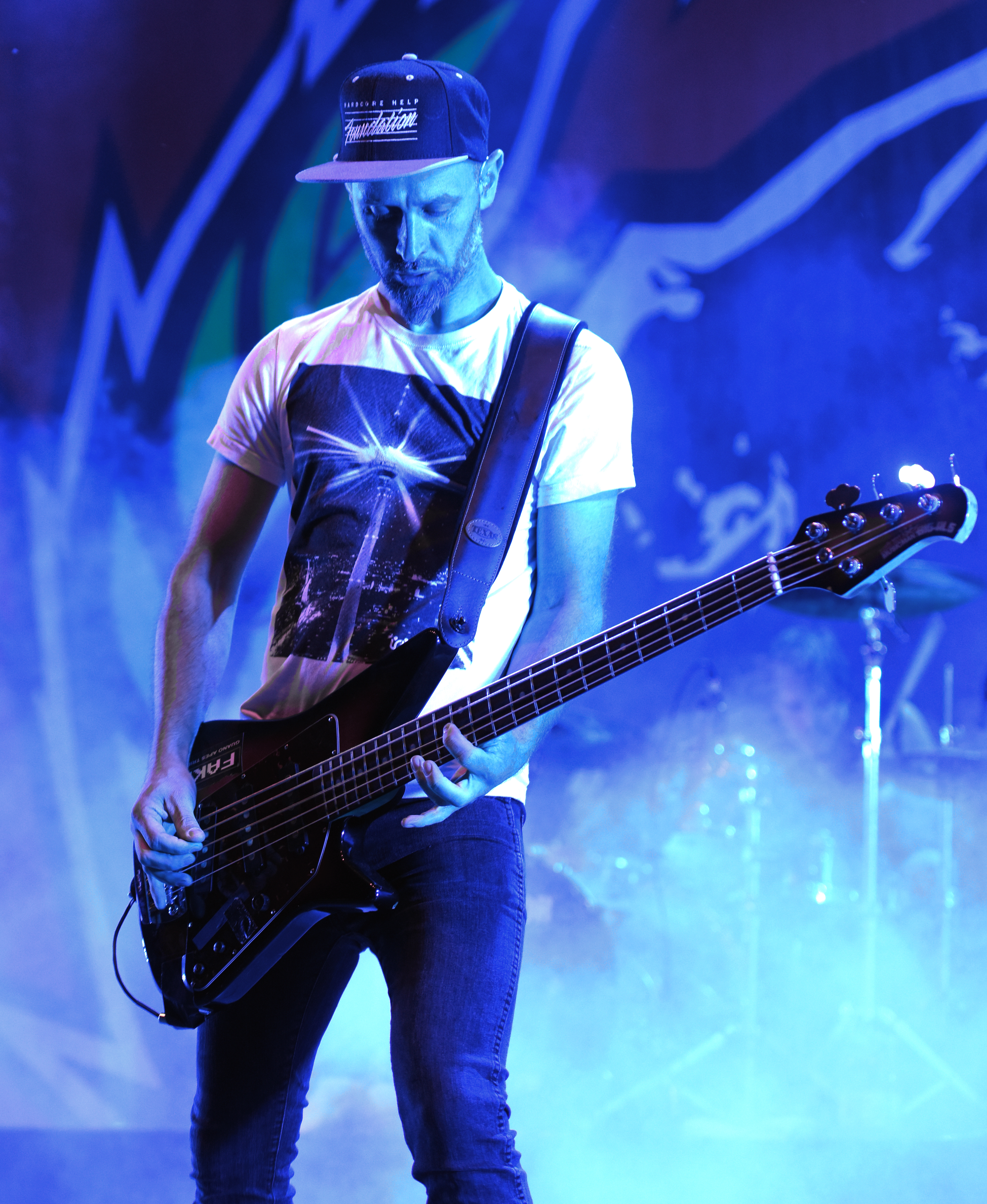
Stefan Ude – bass, backing vocals

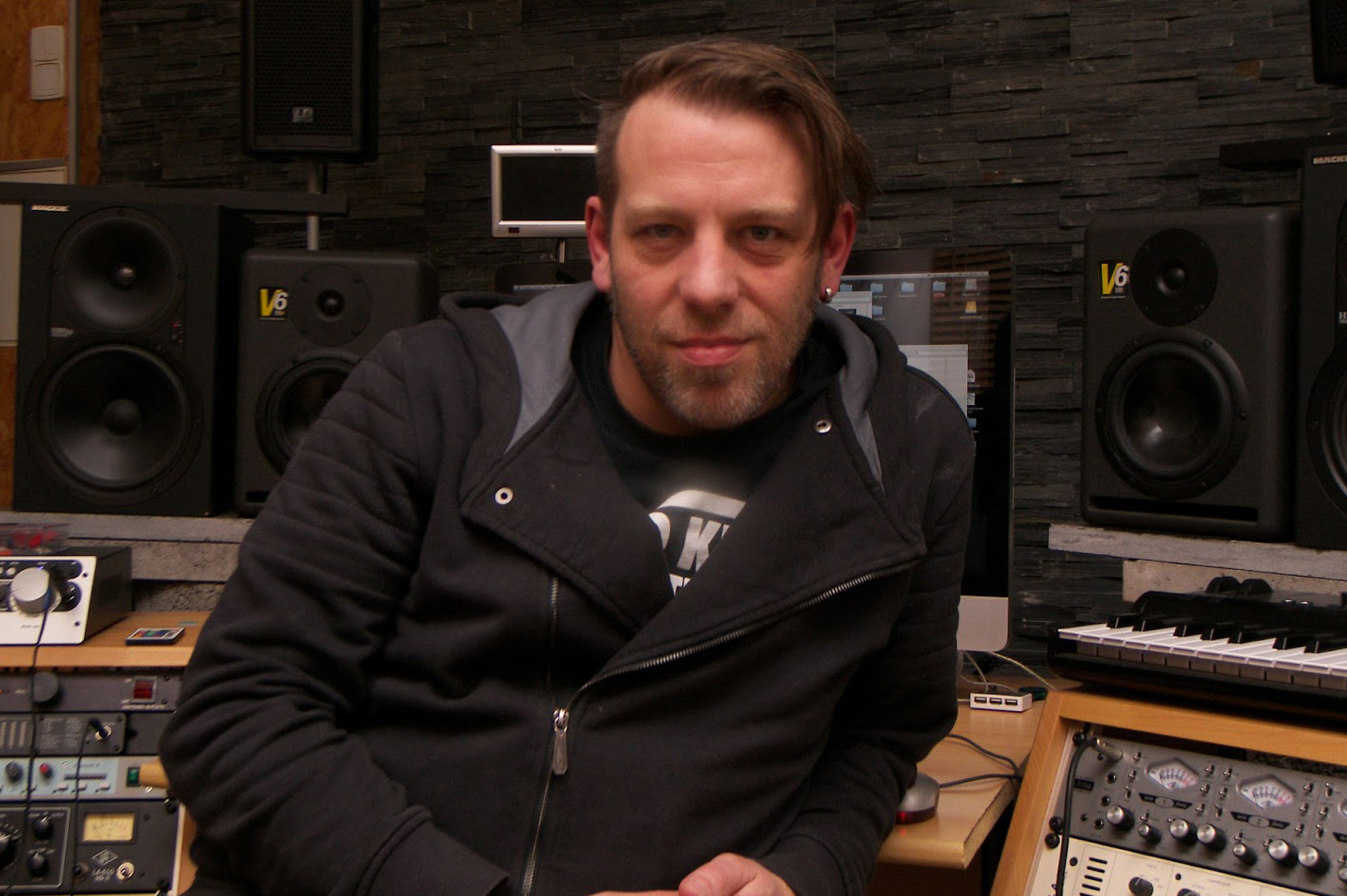
Dennis Poschwatta – drums, backing vocals

== Discography ==
- Proud Like a God (1997)
- Don't Give Me Names (2000)
- Walking on a Thin Line (2003)
- Bel Air (2011)
- Offline (2014)

== Awards ==
Year	Nominee / work	Award	Result	Ref.
1998	Guano Apes	Viva Comet Award for Newcomer National	Won	
1998	Guano Apes	MTV Select – Central	Nominated	
1999	Guano Apes	MTV Europe Music Award for Best German Act	Nominated	
2000	Guano Apes	MTV Europe Music Award for Best German Act	Won	
2001	Sandra Nasić	1LIVE Krone Award for Best Singer	Won	
2003	Guano Apes	1LIVE Krone Award for Best Band	Won	
