= GUN Records =

German record label

- Parent company: Sony Music Entertainment
- Founded: 1992
- Founder: Bogdan Kopec and Wolfgang Funk
- Defunct: 2009
- Genre: Alternative rock, heavy metal, crossover, industrial
- Country of origin: Germany
- Location: Bochum
- Official website: gunrecords.de

GUN Records (Great Unlimited Noises) was a record label located in Witten, Germany, founded in 1992 by Bogdan Kopec (DRAKKAR Promotion Musikverlag GmbH) and Wolfgang Funk. For a period, it was a subsidiary of BMG.

Different artists on the label have had hit singles as well as albums in Europe. A branch of the label known as Supersonic Records existed until 2005, when GUN's parent company BMG merged with Sony. In 2009, GUN Records announced they were closing.

== Former artists ==
- All Ends
- Alien Boys
- Apocalyptica
- Apoptygma Berzerk
- Blackeyed Blonde
- Bullet for My Valentine
- Dark
- Die Happy
- Depressive Age
- Doctor Butcher
- Donots
- Eagles of Death Metal
- Eloy
- Exilia
- Flyleaf
- Guano Apes
- Grave Digger
- HIM
- House of Spirits
- Kick Back
- Krisiun
- Kreator
- Kyyria
- L'Âme Immortelle
- Lordi
- Lovex
- Mind Odyssey
- Monkeys With Tools
- Oomph!
- Paradise Lost
- Rage
- Richthofen
- Running Wild
- Secret Discovery
- SITD
- Sodom
- Sturm und Drang
- Sun
- T.A.S.S.
- Terry Kelly
- Three Days Grace
- Thunderhead
- Tom Angelripper
- U.D.O.
- Van Canto
- Within Temptation

== See also ==
- List of record labels
