= Rev (Ultra Vivid Scene album) =

Studio album by Ultra Vivid Scene
- Released: November 16, 1992
- Recorded: August 1992
- Studio: Zabriskie Point and Axis
- Genre: Alternative rock
- Length: 53:20
- Language: English
- Label: 4AD
- Producer: Kurt Ralske, Fred Maher

Ultra Vivid Scene chronology
Joy 1967–1990 (1990)	Rev (1992)

Singles from Rev
- 1. "Blood and Thunder" Released: February 8, 1993

Rev is an album by the American band Ultra Vivid Scene, released in 1992. It was the band's third and final album. The single, an edited "Blood and Thunder", reached number 27 on the Billboard Modern Rock Tracks chart. Ultra Vivid Scene supported the album by touring with Grant Lee Buffalo.

== Production ==
The album was produced by Kurt Ralske and Fred Maher. Unlike previous albums, Ralske recorded Rev with many other musicians instead of just going it alone.

Ralske often wrote lyrics while still mostly asleep as he preferred the "naturalness" of the process. "Mirror to Mirror" is about materialism.

== Critical reception ==
Professional ratings
Review scores
Source	Rating
AllMusic	4.5/5 stars
Calgary Herald	B
Chicago Tribune	3/4 stars

The Washington Post praised the "elegance" of the album. The Toronto Star wrote that Rev "has Nick Drake-like melodies, T. Rex-ish riffs, ethereal sliding guitar licks, restless rhythms, silences and explosions." The Chicago Tribune noted that Ralske "seems so juiced to be working with a live rhythm section that he just grooves on and on with little heed paid to pop structure."

== Track listing ==
1. "Candida" – 4:38
2. "Cut-Throat" – 5:33
3. "Mirror to Mirror" – 4:50
4. "The Portion of Delight" – 6:12
5. "Thief's Love Song" – 6:07
6. "How Sweet" – 4:40
7. "Medicating Angels" – 8:11
8. "Blood and Thunder" – 10:21
9. "This Is the Way" – 2:48

== Singles ==
- "Blood and Thunder" (February 8, 1993)
  1. "Blood and Thunder" (remix edit)
  2. "Don't Look Now (Now!)" (Crash cover)
  3. "Candida (Theme from 'Red Pressure Mounting')"
  4. "Winter Song" (Nico cover)

== Personnel ==
- Ron Baldwin – backing vocals
- Everett Bradley – conga
- Dorit Chrysler – backing vocals
- Jack Daley – bass
- Julius Klepacz – drums
- Fred Maher – acoustic guitar, drums, producer
- Lloyd Puckitt – engineer
- Kurt Ralske – guitar, vocals, producer, engineer
- Rasputina
  - Melora Creager – cello
  - Serena Jost – cello
  - Julia Kent – cello
- Matthew Sweet – bass
- Sarah Walker – backing vocals
