= The Pregnant Concert =

Live album by Rasputina
- Released: May 10, 2010
- Recorded: Knitting Factory in Williamsburg, Brooklyn on September 13, 2009
- Length: 70:00
- Label: Filthy Bonnet Co.

Rasputina chronology
Ancient Cross-Dressing Songs (2009)	The Pregnant Concert (2010)	Sister Kinderhook (2010)

Packaging
- Back cover

The Pregnant Concert is a live recording of a recital by American rock band Rasputina held at the Knitting Factory in Williamsburg, Brooklyn on September 13, 2009 (although the album cover claims it to have been 1909). It contains songs from various previous Rasputina albums, covers of a variety of other musicians, and the songs "Holocaust of Giants" and "Kinderhook Hoopskirt Works" from their then upcoming album Sister Kinderhook.

As the album title implies, frontwoman Melora Creager was pregnant with her second daughter at the time of the recording. The band asserts that "If you listen very carefully, you might hear Ivy singing with Melora.".

The photographs are by Dese'Rae L. Stage.

== Track listing ==
All tracks are written by Melora Creager, except where noted

No.	Title	Original artist or writer	Length
1.	"Dig Ophelia"		4:01
2.	"Clowns"	Goldfrapp	4:59
3.	"1816, The Year Without a Summer"		4:48
4.	"I Go To Sleep"	Ray Davies	3:23
5.	"I Want To Marry a Lighthouse Keeper" (from A Clockwork Orange) / "Diamond"	Sunforest / Creager & Julia Kent	3:23
6.	"Teenage Kicks"	The Undertones	3:21
7.	"New Zero"		4:36
8.	"Kinderhook Hoopskirt Works"		5:16
9.	"Any Old Actress"		4:36
10.	"Holocaust of Giants"		3:18
11.	"Watch T.V."		5:08
12.	"American Girl"	Tom Petty	3:33
13.	"Possum of the Grotto"		4:04
14.	"The Olde Headboard"		4:33

Encore

1. "Rusty the Skatemaker" / "Bad Moon [Rising] (Creedence Clearwater Revival)" / "Remnants of Percy Bass" – 13:32

== Personnel ==
- Melora Creager – cello, vocals
- Daniel DeJesus – 2nd chair cello
- Julie Griner – drums
