= Unknown (album) =

Studio album by Rasputina
- Released: April 10, 2015
- Genre: Cello rock
- Length: 51:25
- Label: Filthy Bonnet Recording Co.
- Producer: Melora Creager

Rasputina chronology
Great American Gingerbread: Rarities & Neglected Items (2011)	Unknown (2015)

Unknown is the seventh full-length studio album by American cello rock band Rasputina. It was released exclusively on CD through Melora Creager's website on April 10, 2015, and is unlikely to ever be released in digital format – in response to Creager's websites, social media accounts and her own computer being hacked by an identity thief.

== Background and recording ==
In 2012, Creager formed the five-piece narrative musical project Fa La La: the Bastardy of Shakespeare's Madrigals. Inspired by the Madrigal works of Elizabethan author Thomas Weelkes, the project expands on the Oxfordian theory of Shakespeare authorship – the claim that Edward de Vere wrote the plays and poems traditionally attributed to William Shakespeare – by alleging that Weelkes was another pseudonym used by de Vere, and that the music of Weelkes could be seen as scores to Shakespeare's plays.

The fourteen songs found on the album were written and recorded by Creager over a three-week period in early 2015, and were performed by the singer alone in her "dank basement" recording studio using only one microphone – a Neumann copy of a Soundelux E47.

== Inspiration and themes ==
Lyrically, the album's central theme stems from Creager's experience of having her computer, website and social media accounts hacked by an identity thief. Disabling the singer's access to all of the band's online accounts, the hacker eventually rendered Creager's own computer corrupted to the point of her not being able to access anything on it, resulting in the loss of much of her life's work, and leading to a mental breakdown. According to Creager, "Unknown was made in a state of clinical psychosis."

"It was really damaging psychologically, and it made me very paranoid. My imagination, which is really strong, took over and thought the worst. At the same time, there were a lot of positive, spiritual transformations. I got off the Internet 100% for a while. It improved my brain by the end. When I found out it was a woman I knew, and by knowing what had happened, I was able to get better."

—Creager on having her online presence hacked.

She addresses this experience metaphorically on songs found throughout Unknown, which Creager has referred to as her "most personal album". Unable to use her computer to research specific historical situations or people – an approach which she had used when composing much of the band's latter work – she instead chose to write about her "own feelings, rather than taking from something that happened historically". She compared this approach to the one she employed when composing the band's first album, Thanks for the Ether (1996), saying "I used to write songs on paper just from my own thoughts as opposed to 'Google it! Google it! Google it!', I'm done with that kind of regurgitation".

"Unicorn Horn Mounted" is a fable in which the incident is compared to a gamekeeper hunting the mythical creature for the purpose of removing its horn. As the hunter gloats in his trophy room, the unicorn laments being a "pathetic, broken down pony" with a "gory wound on [her] face", and is left distraught over the loss of her magic. "Sensed" tells the story of the last two humans in a post-apocalyptic world, who choose to interact with one another solely through technology. By refusing to ever establish physical contact, they willingly facilitate the extinction of the human race. On "Psychopathic Logic", Creager comments on the ordeal directly by describing the perpetrator as someone who is blind to real human interaction, living instead through a fantasy on a video screen. She goes on to describe the perpetrator as someone who has "no empathy" and who wants "to own the girl, to own her world". "Indian Weed" deals with the issue of online privacy.

The album also contains moments of humor. "Emily Dickinson Trophy Letter" finds the eponymous poet and the Wizard of Oz fighting over the ownership of a bowl of pudding, with the argument eventually devolving into a masked wrestling match. "Pastoral Noir" finds the Roman goddess Vesta in search of her lover, a shepherd named Tony. After questioning several nymphs regarding Tony's whereabouts, she is led to the Greek deity Pan and is then seduced by his "instrument". "Bridget Manners" is in reference to Lady Bridget Manners, a lady-in-waiting for Elizabeth I of England, suggesting that it may have originated as part of the Fa La La project.

== Release and promotion ==
The first new material released by Rasputina in 2015 was a ten-song collection entitled Good Day, Gentlefolk on March 21. Unknown was then released on April 10 on CD exclusively through Creager's website. The album is unlikely to ever be released in digital download format, with Creager explaining that "conceptually, this album doesn't exist on the internet. It is Unknown, but it is a real and physical thing and anyone who purchases it is Known to me". On May 12, she released the first part of the Fa La La collection, containing original music and rearranged versions of Renaissance-era material. She referred to the collection as one of "many more to come. It's an endlessly fascinating subject". On June 26, she released Magnetic Strip, an album of cassette-sourced Rasputina demos recorded between 1991 and 1997. A CD version of the Fa La La collection, limited to 10 copies, followed on July 11. Unknown was promoted by a thirty-three date tour of the U.S. beginning at The Parish in Austin, Texas on July 23 and ending at the House of Blues in New Orleans, Louisiana on Halloween. The live band featured Thanks for the Ether cellist Carpella Parvo and piano by Luis Mojica, as well as incorporating vocal beat-boxing by Mojica and looping pedals.

== Critical reception ==
Due to the album's physical-only release, few online reviews have been published. Creager explained that "it's like a prank because it gives everyone a hard time – like the press who say 'I need a download!', I'm like 'there just isn't one. You have to wait two weeks in the mail like everyone else'". In his review of the album, Falling James of LA Weekly referred to Creager's "real-life horror of losing much of her life's work to a particularly invasive and controlling stalker" and said that "her new songs might be disguised with typically cryptic titles [...], but an unsettling sense of dread and mystery unfolds with every dark rustle of those feverishly restless cellos". Meanwhile, Geoffrey Plant of Weekly Alibi said that "while [it] doesn't rock as hard as some of the previous Rasputina releases, the durable and more avant-garde Unknown is of the highest cello-rock quality". While lauding the band's 2007 release Oh Perilous World as being their "most essential" album, a writer for New York Music Daily said of Unknown, "this is a masterpiece in its own right – and a strong contender for best release of 2015".

== Track listing ==
All songs written by Melora Creager.

No.	Title	Length
1.	"Curse Tablet"	4:21
2.	"Pastoral Noir"	4:16
3.	"Sparrow-Hawk Proud"	3:11
4.	"Unicorn Horn Mounted"	3:40
5.	"Bridget Manners"	2:26
6.	"Indian Weed"	2:58
7.	"Unknown" (Instrumental)	3:05
8.	"Emily Dickinson's Trophy Envelope"	6:29
9.	"Steady Rain" (Instrumental)	3:14
10.	"Psychopathic Logic"	4:34
11.	"Untitled I" (Instrumental)	1:55
12.	"Sensed"	4:46
13.	"Taken Scary"	3:22
14.	"Hymn of the Wormwood Women"	3:02
Total length:		51:25

== Credits and personnel ==
- Melora Creager – vocals, cello, piano, dulcimer, banjo, drums, recording, production, mixing, artwork
