= David Shaw (writer) =

American journalist and writer

- Born: January 4, 1943
- Died: August 1, 2005 (aged 62)
- Education: University of California, Los Angeles (BA)
- Occupation: Journalist

David Shaw (January 4, 1943 – August 1, 2005) was an American journalist. He was best known for his reporting for the Los Angeles Times, where he was awarded the Pulitzer Prize for Criticism in 1991. He wrote criticism of food, wine, and film, but is perhaps best known for taking a critical eye on the media itself.

== Life ==
His first job in the journalism field arose after taking a job when he was 16 years old as a janitor for a company that published a motorcycle newspaper, and earning a job as a reporter after covering a race when one of the staff didn't show up. Within five months he was the publication's editor.

He attended the University of California, Los Angeles, earning a degree in English when he graduated in 1965.

=== Journalism ===
He began working at the Huntington Park Signal while he was in college. He was hired as a reporter by the Long Beach Independent the year after he graduated and was hired by the Los Angeles Times in 1968.

In 1974, he was given an assignment by the paper's editor under which he would cover the news media. In 2002, he was given a column that was printed twice a week, once about news media and once about food and wine.

During his tenure at the Los Angeles Times, Shaw was given the opportunity to spend weeks to months working on an investigation of a single topic that drew his attention, in contrast to the typical day-by-day reporting of most covering the news media. Shaw was more than willing to address issues at the Times itself, including a four-part series published in 1990 that showed that the paper had a record for employing and advancing minority workers that was one of the worst in the area. A 1999 report, running to 37,000 words, documented an unpublicized deal between the paper and the Staples Center under which a special Sunday supplement covering the arena would be published, with the proceeds from advertising split between the two, a deal considered to violate the "Chinese wall" preventing conflict of interest between the editorial and business portions of the paper. The report publicly criticized the parent company's CEO Mark H. Willes, publisher Kathryn M. Downing, and Shaw's boss, editor Michael Parks.

He was awarded the Pulitzer Prize for Criticism in 1991 for his coverage of the McMartin preschool trial and its claims that workers there had sexually abused children and performed Satanic rituals, which were later disproved and none of the accused were convicted after a trial that continued for several years. Shaw's investigations started after the verdicts were first released, and led him to conclude that the media did not perform investigative coverage of the prosecution's case, a failure that might have led to the earlier realization that the evidence offered in the case was "incredibly weak", as described by Ira Reiner, who had served as Los Angeles County District Attorney during the time of the trial.

Books written by Shaw included his 1973 celebrity biography of Wilt Chamberlain, titled Wilt: Just Like Any Other 7-Foot Black Millionaire Who Lives Next Door. He also wrote the 1974 book The Levy Caper, Journalism Today: A Changing Press for a Changing America was published by Harper & Row in 1977, Press Watch came out in 1986, and he wrote his final published book in 1996, The Pleasure Police: How Bluenose Busybodies and Lily-Livered Alarmists Are Taking All the Fun Out of Life, published by Doubleday.

=== Personal ===
Shaw died at age 62 on August 1, 2005, at Cedars-Sinai Medical Center in Los Angeles due to a brain tumor. His son Lucas is an entertainment industry reporter and managing editor at Bloomberg News.

=== Cultural references ===
Cellist Melora Creager wrote a song titled "Border Village" on her solo CD Perplexions in which David Shaw is mentioned in the last line as having died alone at 62.
