= Jack Monroe (song) =

Traditional love song

"Jack Monroe" (Roud 268 and Laws N7), also known as "Jack Munro", "Jack-A-Roe", "Jackaro", "Jacky Robinson", "Jackie Frazier" and "Jack the Sailor", is a traditional ballad which describes the journey of a woman who disguises herself as the eponymous character to board a sailing ship and save her lover, a soldier.

The song was once popular in North America, Britain (particularly Scotland) and Ireland; it was popular as a British broadside ballad in the early 1800s and American broadsides date back to around 1830, although it could be significantly older. The song survived in the oral tradition on both sides of the Atlantic, and became a popular song during the folk revival when Joan Baez covered a version sung by the Ritchie family of Kentucky.

== Popular version ==
The famous version of the song comes from the Ritchie family of Kentucky. Jean Ritchie released "Jackero" on her 1956 album Songs from Kentucky and performed it on Pete Seeger's Rainbow Quest in 1966. Her sister Edna Ritchie sang the song on her eponymous 1962 album. Cecil Sharp had previously collected this version of the song from Jean and Edna's older sister May Ritchie (1896–1982) in 1917.

Joan Baez covered the Ritchie version, singing it as "Jack-A-Roe" on Joan Baez in Concert (1962), and the song became a staple of the folk rock repertoire. The Grateful Dead performed the song on Reckoning (1981) and Bob Dylan sang it on World Gone Wrong (1993). Melora Creager of Rasputina also recorded "Jack-A-Roe" on Ancient Cross-Dressing Songs.

== Other traditional versions ==
=== Britain and Ireland ===
This song has been collected numerous times in Scotland. Hamish Henderson recorded Willie Mathieson of Ellon, Aberdeenshire singing a version called "Jack the Sailor" in 1952, which can be heard via the Tobar an Dualchais archive. Seamus Ennis recorded a version from Frank Steel of Whitehills, Banffshire, also in 1952.

The Irish traditional singer Thomas Moran was recorded by Seamus Ennis singing a variant entitled "Jack Mulroe" in 1954.

Only two versions have been collected in England - "The Maid of Chatham" by Sabine Baring-Gould in Devon in 1893, and "Jacky Robinson" by Ralph Vaughan Williams in Essex.

=== United States ===
Several traditional American versions similar to the Ritchie family version are available online, including one recorded by Alan Lomax in 1937 in Kentucky from Nora Begley, and another sung by Norma Kisner of Springdale, Arkansas.

A 1959 recording of a Lizzie Maguire of Fayetteville, Arkansas, which uses a different variant of the tune, is also available online. In 1931, Florence Reece used a version of "Jack Munro" similar to this variant for her song "Which Side Are You On?", which was famously performed by a variety of musicians including Pete Seeger and Billy Bragg.

== Sources ==
- "Jackie Frazier" lyrics and score
- "English Folk Songs from the Southern Appalachians"
