= Cabin Fever (Rasputina album) =

Cabin Fever!

Studio album by Rasputina
- Released: April 9, 2002
- Genre: Alternative rock; cello rock
- Length: 49:42
- Label: Instinct
- Producer: Melora Creager

Rasputina chronology
The Lost & Found (2001)	Cabin Fever! (2002)	My Fever Broke (2003)

Professional ratings
Review scores
Source	Rating
AllMusic	2.5/5 stars

Cabin Fever! is the third studio album by Rasputina, released in 2002 with Instinct Records. It is noteworthy for its use of industrial influences, particularly the distorted cello.

== Track listing ==
All tracks are written by Melora Creager.

No.	Title	Length
1.	"Gingerbread Coffin"	3:43
2.	"Thimble Island"	2:41
3.	"State Fair"	3:11
4.	"Sweet Water Kill (The Ocean Song)"	3:33
5.	"Remnants Of Percy Bass"	3:34
6.	"Rats"	3:07
7.	"Clipped"	2:51
8.	"PJ + Vincent & Matthew + Björk"	2:26
9.	"My Orphanage"	3:17
10.	"Cross Walk"	3:22
11.	"Hunter's Kiss"	3:55
12.	"Our Lies"	3:09
13.	"AntiqueHighHeelRedDollShoes"	2:13
14.	"Cooped"	1:09
15.	"A Quitter"	7:31
Total length:		49:42

== Critical reception ==
Jamie Kiffel, in a review for Lollipop Magazine, said, "The smell of death still permeates every track. Yet the sweet stink never gets tiresome, thanks to Rasputina’s uncanny ability to sniff out increasingly bizarre permutations of the subject a la Edward Gorey," and "For all its talk of death, this is a sexy album with gutsy deliveries suggesting that, for all its tiny stillness, the doll in the coffin really does have powers."

== Our Lies ==
Around mid-2001, Melora Creager held a contest for the band's mailing list subscribers, asking for fans to send back lies to be used as lyrics for a new song, which became the track "Our Lies". Fourteen copies of a CD single of the song were created as contest prizes, one for each of the 14 winners. The song was rerecorded for Cabin Fever!, and the contest winners were credited as writers in the liner notes.

== Album details ==
- Original Release Date: April 9, 2002
- Label: Instinct Records
- Recording Mode: Stereo
- Recording Type: Studio
- Producer: Melora Creager
- Distributor: Ryko Distribution
- Rasputina: Melora Creager (vocals, dulcimer, cello, piano, programming), K. Cowperthwaite, Nana Bornant (cello, background vocals)
- Additional Personnel: Philosophy Major (drums)
