= Fa La La =

Fa La La may refer to:

- Fa La La, a 2011 album by Victoria Shaw
- Fa La La (album), a multi-album project by Rasputina vocalist Melora Creager
- "Fa La La", a 2011 song by Justin Bieber from Under the Mistletoe
- "Fa La La", a 2011 song by Jim Brickman
- "Fa La La", a 2008 song by The Kooks from Konk

== See also ==
- Solfège, a pedagogical technique for teaching sight-singing
- Refrain, the line or lines that are repeated in music or in verse
