= Mercy seat (disambiguation) =

The mercy seat, in the Hebrew Bible, was the gold lid placed on the Ark of the Covenant.

Mercy seat may also refer to:

== Religion ==
- Throne of Mercy, Christian iconography representing the Trinity
- Mourner's bench, a bench located in front of the chancel in Methodist and other evangelical Christian churches
- Misericord, a small wooden shelf on the underside of a folding seat in a church

== Arts and entertainment ==
- The Mercy Seat (play), a 2002 play by Neil LaBute
- "The Mercy Seat" (song), a 1988 song by Nick Cave and the Bad Seeds
- "Mercy Seat", a 1988 song by Ultra Vivid Scene from Ultra Vivid Scene
- The Mercy Seat, a late-1980s band formed by Gordon Gano
- The Mercy Seat, a 2000 album by Don Moen
- The Mercy Seat, a 1998 novel by Rilla Askew
