= Luis Mojica =

American pianist, singer and songwriter

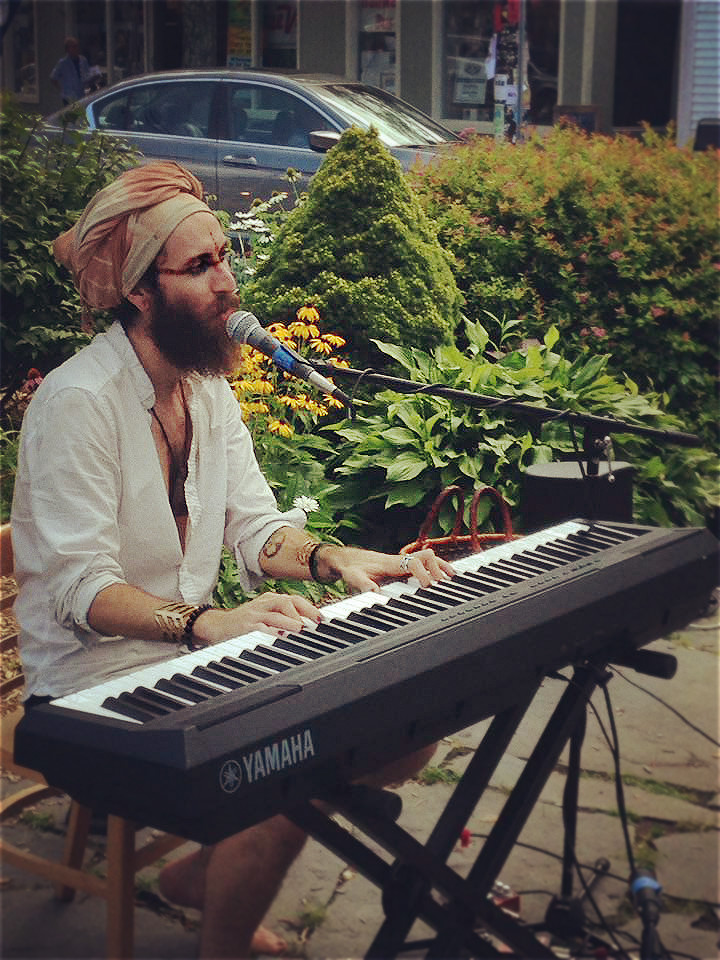

Background information
- Origin: New York City, United States
- Genres: Piano-based, chamber pop, singer-songwriter, alternative
- Instruments: Piano, vocals
- Years active: 2013–present
- Label: Independent
- Website: www.luismojica.com

Luis Mojica is a musician & somatic therapist. He began developing his musical style in New York City's East Village. In 2012, he moved upstate to the Hudson Valley.

== Career ==
=== Music ===
In 2013, he released his first record Anaesthesia through a successfully funded Kickstarter campaign. The entire album was recorded, performed, and arranged by Luis in his bedroom in Brooklyn, New York.

In February 2015, he released The Man Who Fell In Love With The Man Who Fell In Love With The Moon, based on the book by Tom Spanbauer. The album was recorded at his home in Woodstock, New York.

In 2015, Luis toured the country with the cello-rock band Rasputina, becoming the first keyboard player to be added to the line-up. He also beat-boxed and sang backing vocals.

His first studio album Wholesome was released in August 2016. The album featured Melora Creager on cello and Brian Viglione on drums.

Luis' second studio album How A Stranger Is Made was released on October 4, 2019, produced by David Baron, Simone Felice, Fredo Viola and Justin Guip.

Luis released his fifth album "Songs From The Land" on September 20, 2021. The album is his first to be entirely guitar-based and was home recorded & produced by Evan Glenn Adams.

=== Trauma Work ===
Luis is the founder of Holistic Life Navigation, a form of trauma therapy that integrates whole food nutrition, self-inquiry & Somatic Experiencing. He is a Somatic Therapist who specializes in trauma, addiction, and PTSD. He is also the Director of Nutrition and Detox Services at Samadhi, a holistic recovery center in Kingston, New York.

Luis's first book, Food Therapy is being published by Hay House on April 28th, 2026.

== Discography ==
=== Albums ===
- Anaesthesia – Independent, 2013
- The Man Who Fell in Love with the Man Who Fell in Love with the Moon – Independent, 2015
- Wholesome – Independent, 2016
- How A Stranger Is Made – Independent, 2019
- Songs From The Land - Independent, 2021
