= Transylvanian Regurgitations =

EP by Rasputina
- Released: August 12, 1997
- Genre: Alternative rock
- Label: Columbia
- Producer: Jimmy Boyle, Melora Creager

Rasputina chronology
Three Lil' Nothin's (1996)	Transylvanian Regurgitations (1997)	How We Quit the Forest (1998)

Transylvanian Regurgitations is an EP by Rasputina and remixed by Marilyn Manson and Twiggy Ramirez which was released in 1997 by Columbia Records. All songs are by Melora Creager except track 6, Brand New Key by Melanie Safka.

== Background ==
In 1997, Rasputina joined the Arena Tour leg of the year-long worldwide concert tour of American rock band Marilyn Manson, known as the Dead to the World Tour, wherein they served as a "musical interlude" between opening act Helmet and the main act. By mid-April, the eponymous frontman of Marilyn Manson and his bassist Twiggy Ramirez entered the studio with Rasputina to record a remix of the latter's song "Transylvanian Concubine" off of their 1996 release Thanks for the Ether. The resulting sessions produced three tracks, which were previewed online at Rasputina's website. Rasputina went on to join the European Festival Tour leg of the tour as its main opening act. In 1998, the track "Transylvanian Concubine" was featured in the season 2 episode of Buffy the Vampire Slayer, "Surprise".

== Reception ==
Professional ratings
Review scores
Source	Rating
Allmusic	1.5/5 stars

Reception of the EP was mixed. Vincent Jeffries of AllMusic criticized both the Manson remixes as "very similar" and "uninteresting," categorizing the EP as "only [for] obsessed fans," while also saying, "Rasputina is an amazing group and both of its full-length recordings are highly recommended." Laura Wichers of cello.org called the EP "a nice transition from the mainly acoustic sound" of the band's first album Thanks for the Ether to the "heavier" sound of How We Quit the Forest.

== Track listing ==
No.	Title	Length
1.	"Transylvanian Concubine" (The Manson Mix, radio edit)	2:55
2.	"Transylvanian Concubine" (Yes Sir, Mr. Sir Mix)	3:58
3.	"Howard Hughes"	3:17
4.	"Rusty The Skatemaker"	3:39
5.	"Transylvanian Concubine"	2:48
6.	"Brand New Key" (Melanie Safka cover)	2:12

== Personnel ==
Rasputina

- Melora Creager - Cello, Vocals
- Julia Kent - Cello
- Agnieszka Rybska - Cello

Additional Personnel

- Twiggy Ramirez - Guitar, Bass
- Marilyn Manson - Keyboards
- Norm Block - Drums
