= Frustration Plantation =

Album by Rasputina

Studio album by Rasputina
- Released: March 16, 2004
- Recorded: The Blah-Blah Institute, Threshold Music, The Mummy's Tomb
- Genres: Cello rock; Chamber rock; Southern Gothic
- Length: 44:18; 62:45 (with bonus disc)
- Label: Instinct
- Producers: Joseph Bishara, Melora Creager

Rasputina chronology
The Lost and Found, 2nd Edition (2003)	Frustration Plantation (2004)	A Radical Recital (2005)

Professional ratings
Review scores
Source	Rating
AllMusic	4/5 stars

Frustration Plantation is the fourth studio album by American rock band Rasputina, released by Instinct Records on March 16, 2004. While not strictly a concept album, Frustration Plantation does have many songs darkly relating to women's lives in the Old South.

== Critical reception ==
In a review for AllMusic, Heather Phares said of the album, "The idea of mixing eerie, Deliverance-style Southern ambience with Rasputina's aesthetic is an inspired one, and it results in their strongest work to date." Andy Hermann of PopMatters praised Melora Creager's songwriting, and said, "Eccentric instrumentation aside, Rasputina are ultimately just a great pop band with an immensely talented frontwoman, and Frustration Plantation is their most entertaining, consistent work to date." Jamie Kiffel of Lollipop Magazine said of the album, "While it might be easy to call Rasputina’s product a gimmick, Creager’s genuine fascination with her subject matter keeps her death and occult sound, for the loss of a better word, fresh."

== Track listing ==
All tracks are written by Melora Creager, except where noted.

No.	Title	Writer(s)	Length
1.	"Doomsday Averted"		2:34
2.	"Secret Message"		3:16
3.	"Possum of the Grotto"		2:56
4.	"If Your Kisses Can’t Hold the Man You Love"	Jack Yellen, Vivian Ellis	3:07
5.	"The Mayor"		4:37
6.	"When I Count…"		0:26
7.	"High on Life"		3:31
8.	"Wicked Dickie"	Lead Belly	2:23
9.	"My Captivity by Savages"		3:00
10.	"Saline the Salt Lake Queen"		4:06
11.	"Oh, Injury"		4:10
12.	"When I Was a Young Girl"		1:36
13.	"Momma Was an Opium Smoker"		1:52
14.	"Nov. 17dee"	Lyrics by Hollis Lane	1:08
15.	"Girls’ School"		5:29
Total length:			44:18

Poor Relations in the Shed Out Back (Bonus Disc)
No.	Title	Writer(s)	Length
1.	"Yellow Fever" (Frustration Plantation Out-take)		1:27
2.	"Momma Was an Opium-Smoker" (Melora Mix)		1:57
3.	"Nov. 17dee" (Long Version)	Lane	10:24
4.	"Secret Message" (Melora Mix)		3:17
5.	"Crazy Swan" (Cabin Fever remnant)		3:07
6.	"Sanchez" (Frustration Plantation sketch)		0:55
7.	"Mr. Romberg" (from Lakmé)	Léo Delibes	1:30
8.	"My Soul"	Traditional	0:30
9.	"Oh, Injury" (reprise)		2:10
Total length:			18:27 62:45

== Credits ==
- Melora Creager – Cello, dulcimer, vocals, producer, engineer
- Zoë Keating – Cello, vocals, engineer
- Jonathon Tebeest – drums, percussion
- Joseph Bishara – Producer, drum programming, mixing, engineer
- Kenny Dykstra – Engineer
- Tom Baker – Mastering
- Hollis Willa Lane (daughter of Creager) – Vocals on track 14
- Symon Chow – Photography, typography, graphic realization
