= Joy 1967–1990 =

Joy 1967-1990

Studio album by Ultra Vivid Scene
- Released: May 7, 1990
- Recorded: First Protocol, London, November 1989
- Genre: Alternative rock
- Length: 42:16
- Language: English
- Label: 4AD
- Producer: Hugh Jones

Ultra Vivid Scene chronology
Ultra Vivid Scene (1988)	Joy 1967-1990 (1990)	Rev (1992)

Singles from Joy 1967-1990
- 1. "Staring at the Sun" Released: April 9, 1990; 2. "Special One" Released: November 12, 1990

Joy 1967–1990 is the second album by Ultra Vivid Scene, released in 1990.

== Recording and release ==
After finding moderate success with his self-produced solo effort Ultra Vivid Scene, Kurt Ralske returned to the studio in November 1989 to record a follow-up. This time, Ralske brought in producer Hugh Jones, who had previously worked with Echo & the Bunnymen, Modern English, and The Damned, and a handful of session musicians. Two songs featured guest performances: "Special One," with vocals by Kim Deal of the Pixies, and "Beauty #2", with pedal steel work by B.J. Cole. According to Ralske, the title Joy 1967-1990 was intended to be a tombstone inscription.

Upon completion of the album, Ralske recruited a full band consisting of Collin Rae on guitar, Byron Guthrie on drums, and Josephine Wiggs on bass, allowing Ultra Vivid Scene to go on tour for the first time in the spring of 1990.

== Reception ==
Professional ratings
Review scores
Source	Rating
Allmusic	4.5/5 stars

The album debuted on May 7, 1990, to generally positive reviews. Writing for the Chicago Tribune, Bill Wyman described Joy as a "dizzying, insular tour de force" and awarded it three out of four stars. Karen Schoemer's brief writeup in the New York Times concluded that the album "at times seems too contrived, but Mr. Ralske's own joy in the sounds he creates is irresistible." In the Telegram & Gazette, Craig Semon wrote "Even though consistency and clarity are not the band's strong points, Ralske and his bandmates deliver an interesting if not well-wrapped package in 'Joy 1967-1990.'" Allmusic praised "the gossamer web of acoustic and electronic instruments and Ralske's knack for melodies" but found fault with the "dopey lyrics".

== Track listing ==
1. "It Happens Every Time" – 3:18
2. "Staring at the Sun" – 2:47
3. "Three Stars" – 3:19
4. "Special One" – 3:15
5. "Grey Turns White" – 3:18
6. "Poison" – 3:41
7. "Guilty Pleasure" – 3:29
8. "Extra Ordinary" – 3:51
9. "Beauty #2" – 3:59
10. "The Kindest Cut" – 3:09
11. "Praise the Low" – 3:21
12. "Lightning" – 4:45

== Singles ==
- "Staring at the Sun" (April 9, 1990)
  1. "Staring at the Sun"
  2. "Crash"
  3. "Three Stars" (★★★ Version)
  4. "Nothing Better"
- "Special One" (November 12, 1990)
  1. "Special One"
  2. "Lightning (72 B.P.M. / 4 A.M.)"
  3. "Kind of a Drag"
  4. "A Smile and a Death Wish"

== Personnel ==
- Richie Close – programming
- B.J. Cole – pedal steel on "Beauty #2"
- Kim Deal – vocals on "Special One"
- Byron Guthrie – programming
- Hugh Jones – programming, producer, engineer
- Caroline Lavelle – cello on "Three Stars" and "The Kindest Cut"
- Robert McKahey – bodhrán on "Praise the Low"
- Nick Muir – organ and piano on "Special One" and "Extra Ordinary"
- Kurt Ralske – programming, vocals
- Margaret Thorby – recorder and viol on "Praise the Low"

== Charts ==
=== Album ===
Chart	Peak position
UK Albums Chart	58

=== Singles ===
Single	Chart	Peak position
It Happens Every Time	Billboard Modern Rock Tracks	19
Special One	Billboard Modern Rock Tracks	14
Staring at the Sun	Billboard Modern Rock Tracks	25
Staring at the Sun	UK Singles (OCC)	97
