= Ultra Vivid Scene =

American band

- Origin: New York City, New York
- Genres: Indie rock
- Years active: 1986–1993
- Labels: 4AD, Columbia
- Past members: Kurt Ralske; Kristin Kramer; Melora Creager; Gerald Collins; Byron Guthrie; Colin Rae; Ann Hollis; Jack Daley; Julius Klepacz; Moby

Ultra Vivid Scene was an American alternative rock band, started by Kurt Ralske.

== Background ==
Former Nothing But Happiness and Crash guitarist Ralske started Ultra Vivid Scene in 1986, releasing the 7" single "Slow You Down / Totally Free" on Justine Records, in 1986. He was signed to 4AD Records in 1988, and released his first UVS EP, She Screamed, in 1988. The debut album Ultra Vivid Scene released October 1988, was written, produced and performed entirely by Ralske, whose influences include The Velvet Underground and The Jesus and Mary Chain. The second album, Joy 1967–1990, was released in April 1990. The same month they played their first tour dates in the United Kingdom.

The last album, Rev, was released in October 1992, and was performed by a band comprising Julius Klepacz (drums) and Jack Daley (bass) with Ralske on vocals and guitar. This album was picked up by the Chaos imprint of Columbia Records (Sony Music Distribution) during the time rival Warner Bros. was having some success with its imprints' 4AD relationships (4AD/Sire, 4AD/Elektra, 4AD/Reprise).

As a live act, Ultra Vivid Scene performed only a handful of US dates in support of the first album in 1989. The second album in 1990 was supported by one month of touring in Europe and two months in the US. 1993 saw one month of US tour dates for the third and final album.

Ralske has gone on to do solo work, and has also produced albums for such artists as Rasputina, Ivy and Charles Douglas. His last known musical endeavor was his 2001 solo release Amor 0 + 01. Since that time, Ralske has worked as a visual artist.

=== Videos ===
In the "Mercy Seat" video, a young Moby appears playing the guitar, as he performed with the group at the time that single was released.

The 1990 video for the song Special One featured guest singer Kim Deal from Pixies.

== Discography ==
=== Singles ===
| Year | Title | Chart positions | | | | | Album |
| Year | Title | US Hot 100 | US Alt | US Mainstream Rock | UK | UK Indie Chart | Album |
|---|---|---|---|---|---|---|---|
| 1986 | "Slow You Down" | – | – | – | – | – | |
| 1988 | "She Screamed" | – | – | – | – | 14 | Ultra Vivid Scene |
| 1989 | "Mercy Seat" | – | – | – | – | 13 | Ultra Vivid Scene |
| 1989 | "Something to Eat" (promo) | – | – | – | – | – | |
| 1990 | "Staring at the Sun" | – | 25 | – | 97 | – | Joy 1967–1990 |
| 1990 | "It Happens Every Time" | – | 19 | – | – | – | Joy 1967–1990 |
| 1990 | "Special One" featuring Kim Deal | – | 14 | – | – | – | Joy 1967–1990 |
| 1993 | "Blood and Thunder" | – | 27 | – | – | – | Rev |

=== Albums ===
- Ultra Vivid Scene (1988) 4AD/Columbia (UK Indie #10)
- Joy 1967-1990 (1990) 4AD/Columbia
- Rev (1992) 4AD/Columbia
