= The Lost & Found =

The Lost & Found, 1st Edition

EP by Rasputina
- Released: 2001
- Length: 24:45
- Label: Instinct
- Producer: Mike Viola

Rasputina chronology
How We Quit the Forest (1998)	The Lost & Found, 1st Edition (2001)	Cabin Fever (2002)

Rasputina chronology
My Fever Broke (2002)	The Lost & Found, 2nd Edition (2003)	Frustration Plantation (2004)

Professional ratings
Review scores
Source	Rating
allmusic	3/5 stars
Rate Your Music	3.66/5 stars

The Lost & Found is an EP record by Rasputina, the first edition of which was self-released in 2001 and the second edition, featuring two more cover songs, was released in 2003 by Instinct Records. It consists of covers of songs by Creedence Clearwater Revival, Pink Floyd, Marilyn Manson, Pat Benatar, The Velvet Underground, and Led Zeppelin, as well as a rendition of Mother Goose's nursery rhyme "This Little Piggy." The cover art and packaging was designed by artist Ryan Obermeyer.

== Critical reception ==
Jamie Kiffel, in a review for Lollipop Magazine, said of the album, "While most of these are little more than curious novelties, there are some corpsed and dressed covers here that stand quite stiffly on their own. Melora Creager’s version of “Wish You Were Here,” with its sighing vocals, sad strings, and fuzzed-out bass effect is stunning and could frankly break into the Top 40 if the right stations acknowledge it." Joy Hepp of Phoenix New Times remarked, "Perhaps more disturbingly amusing, while CCR's classic "Bad Moon Rising" is fodder for a country hoe-down, Rasputina's version sounds like it's being performed by the house band in a bomb shelter. Creager's haunting voice and an ominous cello put a new twist on old lyrics".

== 1st Edition Track listing ==
No.	Title	Original artist	Length
1.	"Rock and Roll"	Led Zeppelin	3:26
2.	"All Tomorrow's Parties"	The Velvet Underground	4:23
3.	"This Little Piggy"	Traditional	3:25
4.	"Tourniquet"	Marilyn Manson	3:25
5.	"Wish You Were Here"	Pink Floyd	4:23

== 2nd Edition Track listing ==
No.	Title	Original artist	Length
1.	"Bad Moon Rising"	Creedence Clearwater Revival	3:29
2.	"Wish You Were Here"	Pink Floyd	4:23
3.	"Tourniquet"	Marilyn Manson	3:25
4.	"Fire and Ice"	Pat Benatar	2:14
5.	"This Little Piggy"	Traditional	3:25
6.	"All Tomorrow's Parties"	The Velvet Underground	4:23
7.	"Rock and Roll"	Led Zeppelin	3:26
