= Great American Gingerbread: Rasputina Rarities & Neglected Items =

Great American Gingerbread

Compilation album by Rasputina
- Released: April 5, 2011
- Recorded: 1990's-2011
- Label: Filthy Bonnet Recording Co.
- Producer: Melora Creager

Rasputina chronology
Sister Kinderhook (2010)	Great American Gingerbread (2011)	Unknown (2015)

Great American Gingerbread: Rasputina Rarities & Neglected Items is a limited collector's edition compilation album by American cello rock band Rasputina. It was released on April 5, 2011.

The compilation contains a CD of previously unreleased tracks composed of film scores, demos, compilation tracks and tribute pieces which frontwoman Melora Creager describes as "essentially solo works, [her] initial compositions and impulses." It also contains a Bonus DVD that includes a live performance as well as Q&A session recorded in 2002 at the Knitting Factory, in New York City.

== Release ==
=== Promotion ===
As early as March 2011, the song "Ballad of Lizzie Borden" has been available for free download via SoundCloud's website as a way to promote and generate interest for the new record.

=== Critical reception ===
In a somewhat mixed review for PopMatters, Enio Chiola said the album, "plays like an exercise in self-indulgence and is something only die-hard fans could easily digest. Those unfamiliar with the incredibly prolific nature of Melora’s music-making might want to begin with a more easily accessible collection of tunes," and, "Great American Gingerbread is a precious little gem of tunes best absorbed by those who know what they’re getting themselves into." William Ruhlmann of AllMusic similarly stated that, "this is a collection for dedicated fans of Rasputina, especially those who feel that the group has never gone quite far enough." In a slightly more positive review for The Big Takeover, Michael Toland praised the album's consistency, and said, "With the tracks sounding as if they were recorded specifically for this collection Great American Gingerbread is as cohesive and satisfying as any of Rasputina’s non-comp LPs."

== Track listing ==
All songs written by Melora Creager unless otherwise noted.

No.	Title	Length
1.	"Pudding Crypt"	3:06
2.	"I Go To Sleep" (The Kinks cover)	2:55
3.	"Do What I Do"	2:28
4.	"Black Hole Hunter"	3:03
5.	"Black Hole 2"	2:48
6.	"Loom"	3:38
7.	"Death at Disneyland"	3:00
8.	"Skylark"	1:06
9.	"Children's Reform Center"	5:18
10.	"Coraline" (from Where's Neil When You Need Him?)	2:43
11.	"Ballad of Lizzie Borden"	0:56
12.	"Mysterious Man-Monkey"	5:29
13.	"A Skeleton Bang" (from Colours Are Brighter)	1:40
14.	"On My Knees" (from the film On My Knees by Kim Wood)	11:45
Total length:		50:01

Notes

- The bonus DVD consists of Rasputina's live performance at the Knitting Factory in New York City in 2002. It features Rasputina's old lineup from around that period. It also features a Q&A session. As is often the case with Rasputina's anachronistic sense of humor, the performance is credited to have been recorded in 1902.
