= A Radical Recital =

Live album by Rasputina
- Released: September 13, 2005
- Recorded: Halloween, 2004
- Venue: Mr. Smalls Funhouse
- Genre: Cello rock
- Label: Filthy Bonnet Co.
- Producer: Josh Grier

Rasputina chronology
Frustration Plantation (2004)	A Radical Recital (2005)	Oh Perilous World! (2007)

Professional ratings
Review scores
Source	Rating
Allmusic	3/5 stars

A Radical Recital is a live recording of a Rasputina recital held in Pittsburgh, Pennsylvania, at Mr. Smalls Funhouse on Halloween, 2004 (although the album cover claims it to have been 1804). It contains songs from the previous Rasputina albums, and lead singer Melora Creager's spoken introductions. It also has their first recorded release of their cover of "Barracuda", a staple of their live shows.

== Critical reception ==
A review from PopMatters praised Creager's songwriting, as well as the variation in style and arrangement, stating, "The best thing about A Radical Recital is that Rasputina really does have a unique sound, something that is needed more than ever in alternative/pop/rock music."

== Track listing ==
No.	Title	Length
1.	"Saline the Salt Lake Queen"	4:44
2.	"Rats"	3:22
3.	"Howard Hughes"	4:32
4.	"Signs of the Zodiac"	4:25
5.	"Secret Message"	3:43
6.	"Watch TV"	3:36
7.	"Hunter's Kiss"	4:14
8.	"Things I'm Going to Do"	3:03
9.	"If Your Kisses Can't Hold..." (Sophie Tucker cover)	3:02
10.	"Any Old Actress"	3:42
11.	"Rose K."	3:06
12.	"The Mayor"	4:30
13.	"Momma Was an Opium-Smoker"	2:11
14.	"Wicked Dickie" (Lead Belly cover)	2:35
15.	"When I Was a Young Girl"	2:00
16.	"Barracuda" (Heart cover)	3:28
17.	"Rock & Roll" (Led Zeppelin cover)	4:31
18.	"A Quitter"	3:59
19.	"High on Life"	4:01

Bonus tracks

1. "New Zero" – 4:01 (iTunes bonus track)

== Personnel ==
- Melora Creager – cello, vocals
- Zoë Keating – cello
- Jonathon TeBeest – drums
