= Ancient Cross-Dressing Songs =

EP by Rasputina
- Released: September 17, 2009
- Recorded: Brooklyn, NY on September 13, 2009
- Label: none
- Producer: Melora Creager

Rasputina chronology
The Willow Tree Triptych (2009)	Ancient Cross-Dressing Songs (2009)	Sister Kinderhook (2010)

Ancient Cross-Dressing Songs is a 2009 EP by Rasputina. The album contains 3 ancient folksongs about female-to-male crossdressers. It also features a personal message from the band's front woman, Melora Creager. Much like their two previous EPs, Melora a la Basilica and The Willow Tree Triptych, the album is available only via the band's website and is hand-crafted by Creager herself. Of the decision in not using the distribution services of a record label, she opines that,

It's interesting to me that today's music fan sees recordings as "cost per song"- a real iTunes mindset. You will feel better if you look at it like, "Melora made this thing for me with her bare hands."

== Track listing ==
No.	Title	Length
1.	"A Message From Melora"	1:44
2.	"The Female Highwayman"	2:53
3.	"Jackaroe"	2:53
4.	"The Female Smuggler"	4:05
Total length:		11:37

== Album details ==
- Original Release Date: 2009
- Label: none
- Recording Mode: Stereo
- Recording Type: Studio
- Producer: Melora Creager
- Distributor: self-distributed
- Rasputina: Melora Creager (cello, vocals)
