= Sister Kinderhook =

Studio album by Rasputina
- Released: June 15, 2010
- Recorded: Filthy Bonnet Studios in Hudson, NY
- Label: Filthy Bonnet Recording Co.
- Producer: Melora Creager and Brian Kehew

Rasputina chronology
The Pregnant Concert (2010)	Sister Kinderhook (2010)	Great American Gingerbread: Rasputina Rarities & Neglected Items (2011)

Packaging
- Early iteration of the Sister Kinderhook album cover

Sister Kinderhook is the sixth full-length album from American rock band Rasputina. It was released on June 15, 2010.

The album brings with it a fresh lineup in the form of Daniel DeJesus in place of Sarah Bowman in second chair and Catie D'Amica replacing Jonathon Tebeest on drums and percussion. D'Amica was present during the inception, recording and production of the album, however, she has since left the group in order to, as Creager jokes, "go to massage therapy school". She was replaced by Creager's friend, Julie Griner for one show. More recently, Melissa Bell has been drafted into the lineup as percussionist. Another new addition to Rasputina's repertoire is the heavy use of the banjo which replaces the dulcimer featured prominently in the last two albums.

== Lyrics and themes ==
The album revolves around a fantastical theme that explores subject matter such as the New Netherland settlements, Colonial Federalism, feral children, the Anti-Rent Wars of 1844, Early American portraiture, and the prehistoric Mound Builder giants of Illinois and Ohio. The songs Sweet Sister Temperance and My Porcelain Life are based specifically on the life of Emily Dickinson. The band further delved on the record's themes on their Notes from Sister Kinderhook.

Musically, the album's sonical landscape has been "stripped down" compared to the band's last few offerings, returning to the atmosphere of Rasputina's first studio LP Thanks for the Ether.

== Promotion and release ==
As early as February 2010, the album has been leaked on the internet as a way to promote and generate interest for the new record. The album can be streamed via SoundCloud's website in its entirety and the song Holocaust of Giants can be downloaded from Stereogum.

The album was released both as a digipak CD and a vinyl double LP.

== Track listing ==
All songs written by Melora Creager.

No.	Title	Length
1.	"Sweet Sister Temperance"	4:46
2.	"Holocaust of Giants"	2:58
3.	"The 2 Miss Leavens"	3:41
4.	"My Night Sky"	4:19
5.	"Olde Dance"	1:59
6.	"Humankind, As the Sailor"	2:36
7.	"Calico Indians"	5:54
8.	"Snow-Hen of Austerlitz"	3:49
9.	"Dark February"	3:51
10.	"Utopian Society"	1:27
11.	"Afternoon of the Faun"	3:18
12.	"Kinderhook Hoopskirt Works"	4:18
13.	"Meant to Be Dutch"	4:29
14.	"This, My Porcelain Life"	3:21
Total length:		50:54

Bonus tracks

- "Snow-Hen of Austerlitz (Cellist's Revenge Mix)" [iTunes bonus track] - 3:42

== Critical reception ==
Professional ratings
Review scores
Source	Rating
Allmusic	4/5 stars
PopMatters	link
COMA Music Magazine	(Favorable)link

Ned Raggett of Allmusic commented "Released in a year when Joanna Newsom made her own most sprawling artistic statement to date, it's become all the easier to see how Creager and Rasputina served as a touchstone for many who followed. The lyrical focus of Sister Kinderhook is clear enough from the title and art alone... yet it's the sonic variety of the album that stands out all the clearer"." Jer Fairall of PopMatters commented "Sister Kinderhook finds Creager continuing to explore her baroque-pop niche long after many would have thought its potential had been long exhausted. Creager remains as committed to her craft as ever, both in terms of her manipulation of the cello-based format and her lyrics. It is exactly this historical fetishism that highlights what is alternately endearing and alienating about Creager’s music. The easy entry point that the listener is afforded into the material here is refreshing and [it] could use several more moments that are this emotionally accessible... but her obsessive eye for nuance and oddity can just as often have the effect of trapping her subjects under glass rather than figuring out what makes them tick. When she fails to find a human angle... her songwriting occasionally results in that old creative writing no-no of showing rather than telling."

== Charts ==
Year	Chart	Position
2010	Top Heatseekers	43

== Credits and personnel ==
Rasputina

- Melora Creager – Arranger, artwork, banjo, cello, design, engineer, keyboards, mixing, vocals
- Daniel DeJesus – Cello, erhu, vocals
- Catie D'Amica - drums, percussion, djembe, ankle bells

Production and personnel

- Brian Kehew - Mixing
- Paul Gold - Mastering
