= Zoë Keating =

Canadian-American cellist and composer

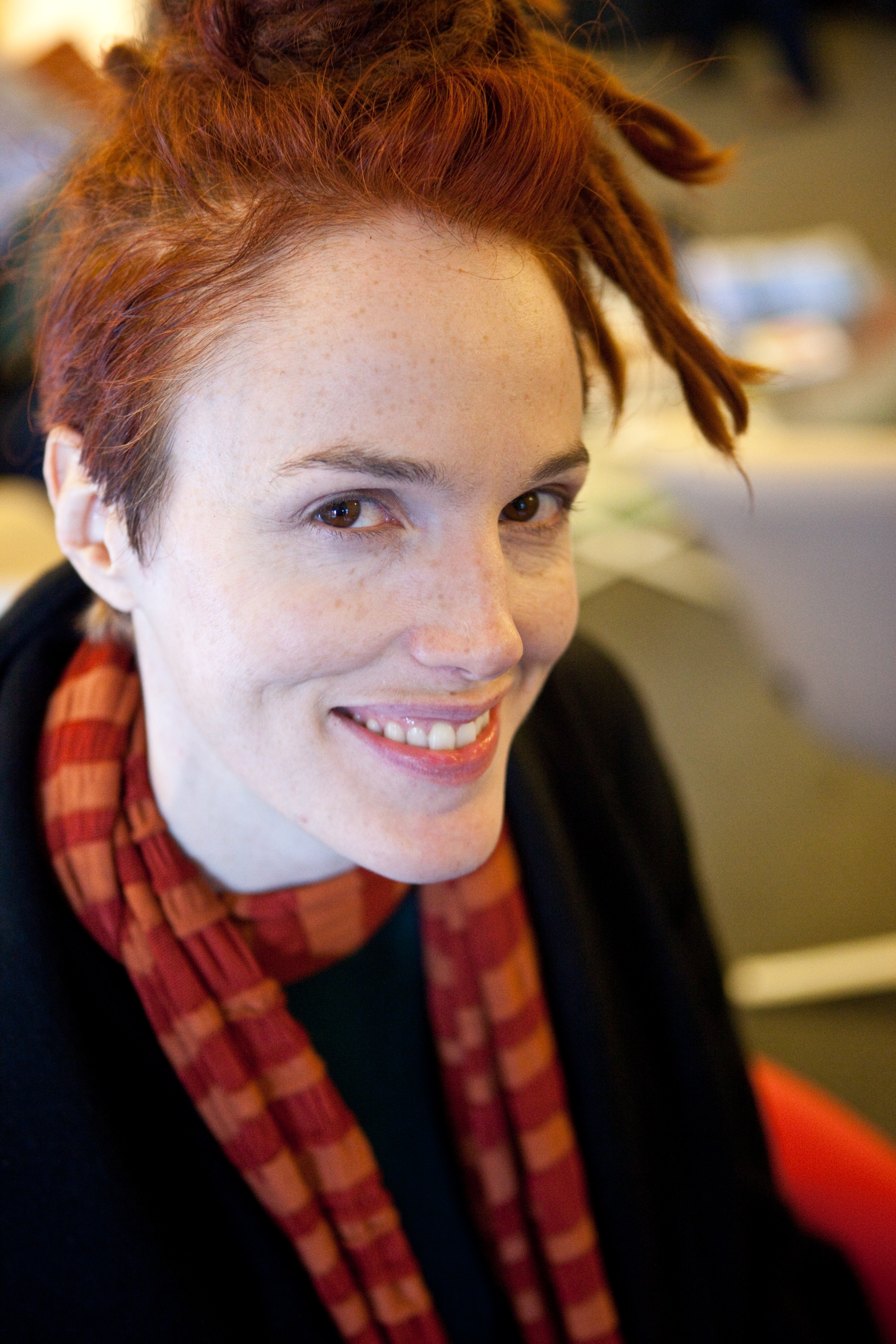
- Keating at Pop!Tech in 2009

Background information
- Born: Zoë Clare Keating; February 2, 1972 (age 54); Guelph, Ontario, Canada
- Origin: San Francisco, California, U.S.
- Genres: Contemporary classical; cello rock
- Occupations: Musician; composer; producer
- Instrument: Cello
- Years active: 1999–present
- Website: zoekeating.com

Zoë Clare Keating (born February 2, 1972) is a Canadian-American cellist and composer once based in San Francisco, California, now based in Vermont.

== Music career ==
Keating performed from 2002 to 2006 as second chair cellist in the cello rock band Rasputina. She is featured on Amanda Palmer's debut solo album, Who Killed Amanda Palmer.

In her solo performances and recordings Keating uses live electronic sampling and repetition in order to layer the sound of her cello, creating rhythmically dense musical structures. As of 29 October 2012, her self-produced album One Cello x 16: Natoma reached number 1 on the iTunes classical charts four times, and "Into the Trees" spent 47 weeks on the Billboard classical chart, peaking at number 7. She is the recipient of a 2009 Performing Arts Award from Creative Capital.

Keating's songs have been featured in various commercials, TV shows, films, video games, and dance performances, including HBO's White Lotus, Amazon Prime's Mammals, CBS's Elementary, NBC's Crisis, So You Think You Can Dance, MTV's Teen Wolf, Dateline, Have You Heard from Johannesburg, The Day Carl Sandburg Died, Alice Walker: Beauty in Truth, The Retrieval, The Witness, and PBS's Searching: Our Quest for Meaning in the Age of Science.

In January 2011, Keating won the award for Contemporary Classical Album from the 10th Annual Independent Music Awards.

In July 2011, Keating was named a Young Global Leader of the World Economic Forum. She performed at the closing ceremony of the forum's Annual Meeting in Davos, Switzerland, in January 2014 and 2016.

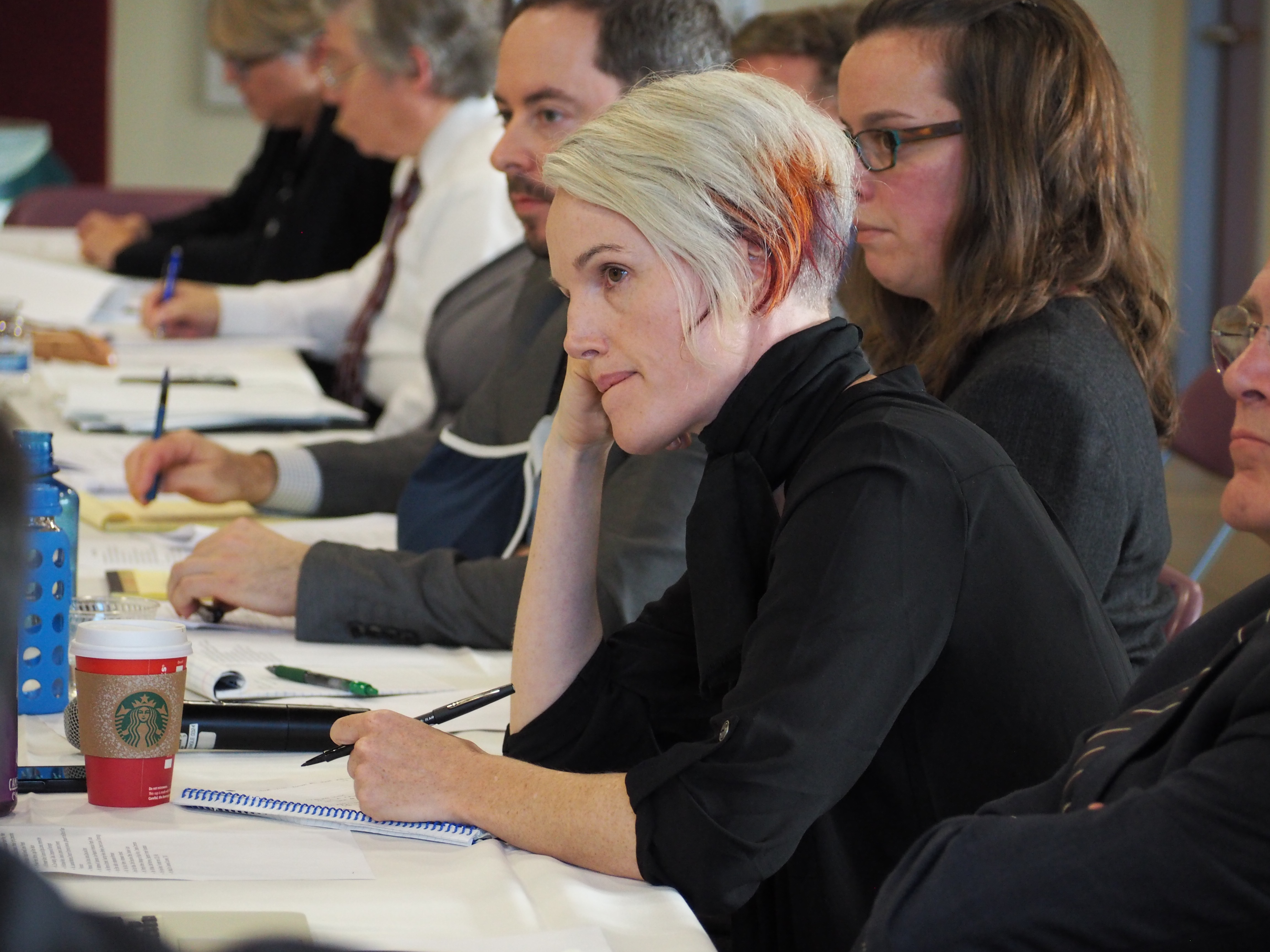
In November 2015, Keating participated in a copyright review event coordinated by the U.S. House Committee on the Judiciary.

On September 1, 2013, the LA Times published an op-ed she authored. It discussed the positive and negative effects of her iTunes revenue on her do-it-yourself performing career.

Keating composed the score to A&E's The Returned with Jeff Russo, and the pair composed music for season 2 of Manhattan, which aired in 2016 on WGN America.

Keating's song "Lost" is the theme music to the podcast On Being.

In 2020, Keating composed the score to The Edge of All We Know, a documentary about black holes. In 2021, during the height of the coronavirus pandemic, Keating co-composed, along with longtime collaborator Jeff Russo, the score to the HBO movie Oslo, a film adaptation of the Tony Award-winning play. On July 13, 2021, Keating and Russo's score for Oslo was nominated for a 2021 Emmy for Outstanding Music Composition for a Limited or Anthology Series, Movie or Special.

Keating is one of the few artists to publish their revenue from streaming services, in order to help others get a better deal.

== Personal life ==
In 1972, Keating was born in Guelph, Ontario, Canada, to an English mother and an American father. She began playing the cello at the age of eight and attended Sarah Lawrence College in New York. Prior to 2005, she worked as an information architect. She worked on projects at the now defunct Perspecta, Inc., and the Research Libraries Group (now part of OCLC) and the Database of Recorded American Music.

In March 2010, Keating announced via her website that she was expecting her first child with her husband, Jeff Rusch, in May.

Rusch was diagnosed with stage 4 cancer in May 2014, and was admitted to the hospital for emergency treatment. Days later, Keating and Rusch received a letter denying coverage for this hospital stay by their insurance company, Anthem. After local media publicized the story, Anthem Blue Cross reversed its decision, telling Keating in a phone call that the hospital stay would be covered. Rusch died on February 19, 2015.

Keating continues to advocate for patients, data portability and the simplification of medical insurance.

In October 2016, she was invited to participate in a panel discussion at the Frontiers Conference with President Barack Obama, Riccardo Sabatini and Kafui Dzirasa, moderated by Atul Gawande.

== Discography ==
=== Solo ===
- 2004 - One Cello x 16 (EP)
- 2005 - One Cello x 16: Natoma
- 2010 - Into the Trees
- 2018 - Snowmelt (EP)

=== Soundtracks ===
- 2001 - I Am a Sex Addict - composer, additional music
- 2005 - Frozen Angels - composer, cello
- 2007 - The Devil's Chair - composer, cello
- 2008 - Ghost Bird - composer, cello
- 2008 - Not Forgotten - cello
- 2008 - The Secret Life of Bees - cello
- 2010 - Breaking Bad - recorded cello version of the theme by David Porter
- 2010 - (1)Doubt, (2)Nostalgia Trio, (3)Frozen Angels, (4)Coda, (5)Legions(War), (6)The Last Bird, (7)Arrival, (8)Legions(Aftermath) - for writing and performing in The House of Suh film credits
- 2010 - The Conspirator - cello
- 2011 - Warrior - cello
- 2012 - Elementary (TV series) - composer, cello
- 2015 - Felizes para Sempre? - composer of "Tetrishead", opening and ending theme
- 2015 - The Returned - composer, producer, cello, keyboards, vocals, guitar
- 2016 - Manhattan (TV series) - composer, cello
- 2016 - The Witness (2016 video game) - composer of "Escape Artist" used in the promotional video.
- 2017 - SMILF - composer, cello
- 2020 - The Edge of All We Know - composer, cello, piano
- 2021 - Oslo - composer, cello
- 2022 - Searching: Our Quest for Meaning in the Age of Science
- 2023 - White Lotus - composer of "We Insist" and "Legions (War)" used in S2E8 and S2E9
- 2024 - Corpus and The Wandering - composer, cello, vocals
- 2025 - Étoile - composer of "Piece 1" in Episode 4
- 2025 - Steal This Story, Please! - composer, cello, piano

=== Dance Works ===
- 2008 - Llebeig with the Valencia Ballet - composer and performer, cello
- 2014 - Boulders and Bones with ODC Dance - composer and performer, cello
- 2021 - Swing Low with Joffrey Ballet - composer

=== With Imogen Heap and Pattie Gonia ===
- 2026 - Have You Considered?

=== With Mike Gordon and Leo Kottke ===
- 2020 - Noon

=== With Curt Smith ===
- 2010 - All is Love

=== With Pomplamoose ===
- 2009 - Always in the Season

=== With Halou ===
- 2008 - Halou

=== With Amanda Palmer ===
- 2008 - Who Killed Amanda Palmer
- 2010 - Amanda Palmer Performs the Popular Hits of Radiohead on Her Magical Ukulele
- 2015 - Bigger on the Inside
- 2018 - Big Yellow Taxi covered by Amanda Palmer, Zoe Keating, Sean Ono Lennon, John Cameron Mitchell

=== With Mar ===
- 2007 - The Sound

=== With Rasputina ===
- 2004 - Frustration Plantation
- 2005 - A Radical Recital

=== With John Vanderslice ===
- 2002 - Life and Death of an American Fourtracker

=== With Tarentel ===
- 2001 - The Order of Things

=== With Dionysos ===
- 1999 - Haiku
