= Fredo Viola =

- Born: Alfred Viola
- Origin: London, England
- Genres: Folk, ambient, post rock
- Years active: 2004–present
- Label: Because Music
- Website: fredoviola.com

Fredo Viola is an American singer/songwriter and multi-media artist. He was born in London, England, but has resided in the United States for most of his life. He lives in Woodstock, N.Y. He graduated from Tisch School of the Arts at NYU, but has always been most passionate about music. Viola lists some influential artists, such as Shostakovich, Britten, Bartók, Stravinsky and Belle & Sebastian.

== Career ==
He had an internet hit on YouTube with "The Sad Song" in 2004. In 2007, he signed with French label Because Music.

In late 2007, Fredo devoted his attention to a long series of live to Digital Performances he called "cluster videos", by releasing one video each month on his website.

In late 2008, working in collaboration with the Spanish agency Aer studio, he released an interactive web site called The Turn, a web site that also serves the function of displaying his new interactive videos. The videos come in unusual shapes (circular, hexagonal) as well as widescreen rectangles, and can be turned during playback. The website won several prestigious European awards and was written up in Communication Arts Magazine.

In late 2008 Fredo released The Turn with French record label Because music. The album was cited as #2 album of the year by French music magazine, Les Inrockuptibles, as well as #4 by Le Monde and Yahoo France. He was nominated in 2009 for a Prix Constantin award in France, and performed on several notable French TV shows, including One Shot Not and Taratata.

His second studio album titled "Revolutionary Son" was released under Revolutionary Son Productions, LCC in April 2014. The record was said to be "An audacious album pulsing with rhythm, colour and, above all, sumptuous melody." by Chris Evans of Allmusic. It made #52 on Les Inrockuptibles list of Top 100 Albums in 2014.

In 2015, he released the first of series of short, improvised a cappella pieces titled "The Elementals: It Began To Rain" on May 1, 2015. That same year he began a music collaboration with pianist Luis Mojica, and performance artist Ryder Cooley in what was known as "The Platte Clove Nature Theater".

In 2016 he was one of three lab jurors for the category of best Experimental film at the Clermont-Ferrand Film Festival, where he also shot an experimental performance video with La Blogotheque.

Fredo has been at work on his third album, which has an expected release of Autumn, 2018.

== Discography ==
=== Albums ===
- The Turn (December 2008)
- Revolutionary Son (April 2014)
- "The Elementals: It Began To Rain" (May 2015)
- ”My New Head” (April 2021)

=== Singles and EPs ===
- The Sad Song (February 2008)
- Red States (December 2008)

== Other notes ==
In 2004, "Let the Sad Out" was licensed for use in Jonathan Demme’s film The Manchurian Candidate.

In 2005, Viola had four songs licensed for use in Mike Binder's film Man About Town, for which he produced a second version of his "Sad Song" video.

"The Sad Song" was used on season four of The O.C: "The Shake Up", "The Night Moves" and in season 5 of CSI: Miami in the episode "Broken Home". Additionally, the song is played at the beginning and at the end of the movie The Education of Charlie Banks. Most recently, "The Sad Song" was used in the 2008 film Birds of America.

== Videography ==
- "The Sad Song" (2004)
- "The Turn"
- "Silent Night"

== Sources ==
- "The Sad Song" - Review DJ Magazine, December 19, 2007.
- "The Sad Song" - Review The Guardian, February 16, 2008
- "The Sad Song EP" - Review Clash (magazine)
- "The Sad Song EP" - Review The Milk Factory
- The Hottest Downloads The Times, February 24, 2008.
- Biography from his Music label
