= Character (Julia Kent album) =

Studio album by Julia Kent
- Released: 4 March 2013
- Genre: Instrumental
- Length: 41:00
- Label: The Leaf Label
- Producer: Julia Kent

Julia Kent chronology
Green And Grey (2011)	Character (2013)	Asperities (2015)

Character is the fourth full-length album by Canadian cellist Julia Kent, released on The Leaf Label on 4 March 2013.

== Background ==
Character is a solo album recorded by Kent in her home studio in New York City. The compositions on the album are built around Kent's layered, multi-tracked cello, electronics as well as found sounds. In an interview, Kent said about the album, "“[The] Incorporated sounds are important...They contrast and complement the cello, my primary instrument, and also evoke the concept of a voice without being, literally, a voice. So I used a lot of found and processed sounds to try to achieve that: from matches being struck, to wineglasses, to the sound of pen on paper, to an ancient autoharp that, over time, ended up being detuned in a way that created an amazing sonority.”

== Critical reception ==
Professional ratings
Review scores
Source	Rating
The Skinny	3/5 stars
AllMusic	4/5 stars
Headphone Commute	4.5/5 stars

Character received positive reviews in the press. The Skinny wrote that the album "has a pronounced transportive power, its affecting serenity capable of sparking the same kind of meditative introspection in the listener as that which reportedly drove its creation", but added that "after a while, the textures blur and the willing sense of absorption fades into distraction, with tracks too similar in sound for all to possess their own distinct tenor. While it lasts, however, the spell cast is strongly felt, and therefore worth seeking exposure to". The Headphone Commute wrote "The soundscape of Character is minor in chord progression, major in cinematic undertones, and neutral in acceptance of things as they are. There is a certain meditative aspect to the music, which at times rejects its nature and picks up in pace, only to stop chasing, catching its breath, and subsiding again. The pieces become a soundtrack to our daily trepidation, perhaps in facing the fictitious story that we live". The album received praise from AllMusic, who wrote "Character may not carry the blissed-out expressions Kent's earlier records did. But it is here that she speaks most poignantly of loneliness, fear, desire, life's richness, and more -- by creating a listening experience of nearly cavernous depth and poetic beauty".

== Track listing ==
All music written by Julia Kent.

No.	Title	Length
1.	"Ebb"	2:51
2.	"Transportation"	4:39
3.	"Flicker"	3:40
4.	"Tourbillon"	3:16
5.	"Fall"	4:30
6.	"Kingdom"	4:53
7.	"Only Child"	4.24
8.	"Intent"	4:21
9.	"Salute"	4:28
10.	"Nina And Oscar"	3:44

== Personnel ==
- Julia Kent — cello, electronics, compositions
- Marlan Barry - mixing
- Joe Lambert - mastering
