= Temporal (Julia Kent album) =

Studio album by Julia Kent
- Released: January 25, 2019
- Length: 38:01
- Label: The Leaf Label

Julia Kent chronology
Asperities (2015)	Temporal (2019)

Professional ratings
Aggregate scores
Source	Rating
Metacritic	83/100
Review scores
Source	Rating
AllMusic	4/5 stars
The Guardian	4/5 stars
PopMatters	7/10
Headphone Commute	Positive

Temporal is the sixth studio album by Canadian cellist Julia Kent. It was released on January 25, 2019 through The Leaf Label.

== Track listing ==
No.	Title	Length
1.	"Last Hour Story"	12:15
2.	"Imbalance"	4:14
3.	"Conditional Futures"	4:01
4.	"Floating City"	3:37
5.	"Sheared"	3:36
6.	"Through the Window"	5:51
7.	"Crepuscolo"	4:27
