= The Willow Tree Triptych =

EP by Rasputina
- Released: May 12, 2009
- Recorded: Hudson Valley, NY on March 17, 2009
- Label: none
- Producer: Melora Creager

Rasputina chronology
Melora a la Basilica (2008)	The Willow Tree Triptych (2009)	Ancient Cross-Dressing Songs (2009)

The Willow Tree Triptych is a limited edition EP by Rasputina, of 100 units which were released in 2009. The album contains 3 different songs from 3 countries, all titled "The Willow Tree", in American, English, Irish. The album also features individual hand-numbered and hand-collaged covers by Melora & Hollis so each CD packaging is unique.

== Track listing ==
No.	Title	Length
1.	"American"	2:27
2.	"English"	2:34
3.	"Irish"	4:03
Total length:		09:03

== Album details ==
- Original Release Date: 2009
- Label: none
- Recording Mode: Stereo
- Recording Type: Studio
- Producer: Melora Creager
- Distributor: self-distributed
- Rasputina: Melora Creager (cello, vocals)
- Additional Personnel: Hollis Lane Creager (album artwork).
