= Jonathon TeBeest =

American drummer

- Born: Montevideo, Minnesota
- Occupation: musician
- Instrument(s): vocals, drums, percussion, guitar
- Years active: 1998–present

Jonathon S. TeBeest is an American drummer, born and raised in Montevideo, Minnesota best known for his work in the cello-based group Rasputina. He was a member of the band from 2002 to 2008 and was previously associated with the act 3 Minute Hero where he garnered the nickname "ATHENS-manservant". Jonathon now fronts his band, Sawbones.

Former band member Melora Creager has quipped that "There is an eccentric, pansexual genius secretly living inside of Jonathon".

== Background ==
TeBeest was raised in the Midwest, and recently moved back to Minnesota after a stint in New York City. He has always lived a life of music – he has been playing the drums since the age of 3. With this talent and a fervent love of music, TeBeest has been touring and recording with bands since the age of 19. Along the way, he has also had training on the piano and all things percussion, has picked up the guitar, bass, and pretty much anything else he could get his hands on. TeBeest started his professional career with the intense horn-driven party band, 3 Minute Hero in his homeland of Minnesota. That band started his love of performing live as the boys were playing about 250 shows per year during its existence. Eventually it was off to New York, where TeBeest hooked up with Ms. Melora Creager and her group Rasputina. He has since appeared on five of the group's albums, including the recently released Oh, Perilous World!, and has also toured the nation with Rasputina. In the past, he has worked with many other bands including New Professionals, Mink, Gravity, THIS, Strangelove, Goodfinger and Dirty Excuse. TeBeest is a songwriter and now fronts the Minneapolis band, Sawbones.

== Discography ==
=== Sawbones ===
- Hot as a Whorehouse on Nickel Night (2010)

=== 3 Minute Hero ===
- Everyday Ninjas (1998)
- Operation Brownstar (1999)

=== Rasputina ===
- My Fever Broke (2002)
- The Lost and Found, 2nd Edition (2003)
- Frustration Plantation (2004)
- A Radical Recital (2005)
- Oh Perilous World (2007)
