= Jimmy Boyle (music producer) =

American musician (born 1967)

- Born: November 4, 1967 (age 58); Brooklyn, New York, United States
- Origin: Casselberry, Florida, United States
- Genres: Industrial rock; Alternative rock; Punk rock; DIY ethic; post-industrial
- Occupations: record producer; songwriter; musician; record producer; film score composer
- Years active: 1986–present
- Labels: Maverick; Columbia; American Recordings; Sayten Records
- Website: zjh1m.com

Jimmy Boyle (born November 4, 1967) is an American record producer, songwriter and musician of Irish descent. He has performed on, engineered or produced records for a diverse range of musical artists including the Red Hot Chili Peppers, Alanis Morissette, Dave Navarro, John Frusciante, Rasputina, Johnny Cash, Hole, Three Amoebas, and Rage Against the Machine. His record and album collaborations have sold over 50 million copies worldwide. His work on Alanis Morissette's single, "You Oughta Know" went on to win Grammy's for Best Rock Song and Female Rock Vocal Performance.

Boyle spent seven years in connection with producer Rick Rubin, partnering with him for various pre-production, A&R, engineering, production and mixing tasks. After breaking with Rubin and Def American Records, he joined Columbia Records as staff producer and then Senior VP of A&R (Artists and Repertoire) for Columbia Records.

== Early life ==
Boyle was born in Brooklyn, New York and at an early age moved to Casselberry, Florida, a suburb of Orlando, Florida. He is of American and Irish descent. Boyle began playing the guitar at the age of 12 and showed an early talent for music. In an interview with Phil Blankenship, Boyle stated, "My life fit into the punk lifestyle. I learned to do everything on my own. Skateboarding was important to me but I gave it up to start doing music." In that same interview, Boyle states:

I wanted to escape from suburbia and head to the LA music scene. I was 14 when I quit school and took off to LA. It was all part of being in the punk music scene and being true to myself. Doing what I wanted, when I wanted and how I wanted.

== Professional career ==
=== Early musical projects ===
Pursuing music, he quit high school and moved to LA. Boyle enrolled at the Guitar Institute of Technology, now the Musicians Institute to hone his skills. In an interview he reminisced about his early days in LA's music scene. "The Punk lifestyle kept me going. I went where the music was. The LA music scene of the late 1980s and early 1990s was a golden era." Boyle would hit 3 to 5 LA clubs nightly including Scream, Club with No Name, the Viper Room, Jabberjaw, Club Lingerie and Coconut Teaszer to name a few. Boyle connected with Matt Dike of Delicious Vinyl Records as well as Brendan O'Brien. In 1988, he became friends with and started working with record producer, Rick Rubin, and in 1995 formed the now defunct Sayten Records.

=== You Oughta Know ===
As Alanis Morissette states in her biography, Boyle brought in bassist Flea of Red Hot Chili Peppers and guitarist Dave Navarro (of Jane's Addiction) and reconstructed "You Oughta Know" that went on to receive a Grammy Award for Best Rock Song 1996. Boyle wanted a much angrier sound than Alanis had originally envisioned and took the song in a new direction. Boyle's version is known as "You Oughta Know (Jimmy the Saint Blend)". Boyle is credited on the album as Jimmy Boyelle. Boyle thought it was funny to use the last name Boyelle whenever he was around Alanis Morissette because she is French Canadian.

=== Musical collaborations ===
Having a cutting edge recording studio in his West Hollywood home allowed Boyle to collaborate with a variety of musicians and artists. With Dave Navarro he worked on his Molecule project. He became close friends with Anthony Kedis, starring in a short film alongside Sophia Coppola and Blondie's Debbie Harry called Changing Fashions. In 1994, he helped produce, record and engineer on Johnny Cash's comeback album. In 1997, Boyle helped get John Frusciante clean and back into the studio. Frusciante's album Smile, was recorded in producer Boyle's LA Studio in addition to the tapes of 3 Amoebas (his improv trio with Flea and Jane's Addiction drummer Stephen Perkins). One of Boyle's major discoveries as VP of A&R for Columbia was Rasputina, a cello-driven band based in New York that is renowned for their unconventional and quirky style as well as their fascination with historical allegories and fashion. Boyle saw the group perform at a festival and they were signed to Columbia. He and Melora Creager went on to record and produce Rasputina's first album Thanks for the Ether in 1996. Boyle acquired a Neve 8028 Mixing Console, "one of four in the world," from Studio 56, for his personal studio.

=== Solo projects ===
In 2011, Boyle adopted the persona Zhj1m as a solo artist. Photographer Patrik Andersson worked with him to create the music video Butterfly - The Ghosts of Jimmy Boyle. He has gone on to create performance art music videos that combine original compositions tied with abstract film clips as an expression of his frustration of the commercialism of popular music.
