= Oh Perilous World =

Studio album by Rasputina
- Released: June 26, 2007
- Length: 70:47
- Label: Filthy Bonnet

Rasputina chronology
| A Radical Recital (2005) | Oh Perilous World (2007) | Melora a la Basilica (2008) |

Oh Perilous World, the fifth full-length studio album from American cello rock band Rasputina, was performed by the band's creator cellist/lead singer Melora Creager and drummer Jonathon TeBeest with second chair Sarah Bowman contributing additional vocals. It is a concept album and was released by the Filthy Bonnet Recording Co., with distribution through Rykodisc.

== Origin and recording ==
Following the release of her 2006 solo album, Perplexions, singer/lead cellist Melora Creager spent the time scouring world events and adapting them into songs. She said:

"I wrote the songs featured on Oh Perilous World over the last two years when I realized that current world events were more bizarre than anything I could scrounge up from the distant past. I obsessively read daily news on the Internet and copied words, phrases and whole stories that especially intrigued me and compiled a vast notebook of this material."

== Concept ==
The storyline of Oh Perilous World, essentially, is an audit of six years of post-9/11 America and its domestic and foreign policies under President George W. Bush's administration, but told through a fictional steampunk parallel universe. In this world, America is ruled by the tyrannical Queen of Florida, Mary Todd Lincoln, threatening war and occupation of the small, third-world sovereign of Pitcairn Islands (a metaphor for the Middle East) using her blimps and airships. Her opposite number in Pitcairn is an Osama bin Laden-like resistance leader, Thursday October Christian I (in real life the offspring of Fletcher Christian, leader of the Bounty mutineers who settled on the island).

== Critical reception ==
Professional ratings
Review scores
| Source | Rating |
|---|---|
| allmusic | 4/5 stars |
| PopMatters | 7/10 stars |
| Prefix | 6.5/10 stars |
| Rate Your Music | 3.57/5 stars |

Travis Woods of Prefix commented, "The strange alt-history storyline works by allowing the listener to step back from the haunting immediacy of current events and yet still gauge the emotional heft and consequence of the pixelated horrors broadcast on our nightly news...Having loosened their corsets enough to allow modern resonance to finally seep into one of their albums, the members of Rasputina have contributed to the pantheon of good art created in the wake of terrible events. Here's hoping, though, that next time around we'll hear an album of great art, with a world less ready to inspire with its televised peril. Or, at the very least, that they'll leave the rawk-guitar bombast for the Capital G's and Good Soldiers of YearZero." Andy Whitman of allmusic commented "..forget the linear, rational explanations and just bask in the audacity of it all. This is a universe inhabited solely by Melora Creager... Oh Perilous World offers the kind of cracked world-view that will either strike you as inspired eccentricity or insufferable lunacy. In either case, it's a wild ride made more palatable by a restless musical imagination. You're unlikely to find a stranger -- or more strangely compelling -- album this year." Jennifer Kelly of PopMatters commented "Literate, carefully constructed, ferociously belted and rocked and drummed, these are songs for a hard-rocking apocalypse. The cello—like the Victorian females who populate these songs—is stronger, and angrier and more desperate than it seems. I’d get out of the way if I were you. This perilous world is about to blow."

== Track listing ==
All songs written by Melora Creager.

| No. | Title | Length |
|---|---|---|
| 1. | "1816, The Year Without a Summer" | 4:23 |
| 2. | "Choose Me for Champion" | 2:36 |
| 3. | "Cage in a Cave" | 3:50 |
| 4. | "Incident in a Medical Clinic" | 3:52 |
| 5. | "Draconian Crackdown" | 4:02 |
| 6. | "Child Soldier Rebellion" | 3:49 |
| 7. | "Oh Bring Back the Egg Unbroken" | 3:55 |
| 8. | "Old Yellowcake Breaking News" | 0:35 |
| 9. | "In Old Yellowcake" | 4:05 |
| 10. | "We Stay Behind" | 3:19 |
| 11. | "A Retinue of Moons / The Infidel is Me" | 7:05 |
| 12. | "The Pruning" | 4:18 |
| Total length: | | 45:56 |

Standard Edition bonus tracks

1. "The Question of Time" - 2:39
2. "Identity Tokens" - 4:54
3. "The Humanized Mice" - 2:19
4. "The Pruning (Pat O'Brian & Access Hollywood Mix)" - 4:17
5. "Flood Corps" - 1:36
6. "Incapable of Regret" - 2:02
7. "Desert Vampire" - 1:36
8. "The Contractors" - 2:09
9. "Infidel Instrumental Demo" - 3:26

== Charts ==
| Year | Chart | Position |
|---|---|---|
| 2010 | Top Heatseekers | 25 |

== Credits and personnel ==
Rasputina

- Melora Creager – Artwork, Audio Production, Cello, Composer, Design, Dulcimer, Producer, Recorder, Vocals
- Sarah Bowman – vocals (Background)
- Jonathon Tebeest - Drums, Percussion, Piano, Vocals

Production and personnel

- Charlie Campbell - Audio Production, Producer
- Peter Wright - Executive Producer, Management
- Dae Bennett - Mixing
- Kevin Hodge - Mastering
- Dan Selzer - Layout Design
