= Dese'Rae L. Stage =

American photographer, writer, speaker, and suicide awareness activist

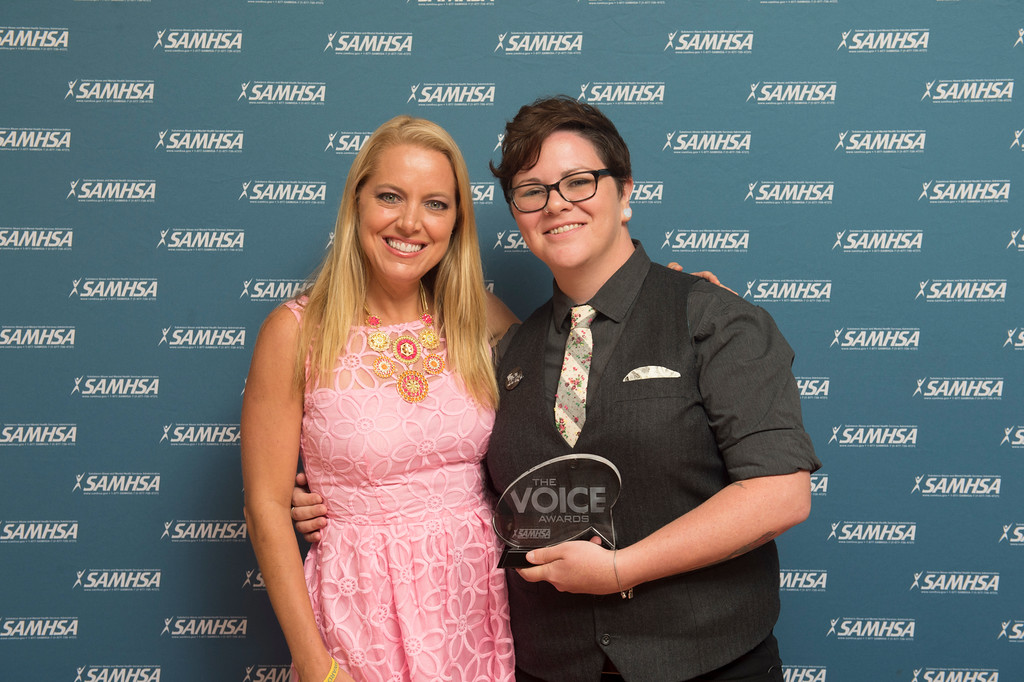
- Food Network host Melissa d'Arabian (left) stands with 2015 SAMHSA Voice Award winner, Dese'Rae L. Stage (right).
- Born: May 6, 1983 (age 43); Miami, Florida
- Occupations: Artist and activist
- Years active: 2010-present
- Known for: Multimedia documentary series Live Through This
- Website: Live Through This

Dese'Rae L. Stage is an American photographer, writer, speaker, and suicide awareness activist. She created Live Through This, a multimedia series of portraits and true stories of nearly 200 suicide attempt survivors across the United States.

== Background ==
Stage was born in Miami, Florida. She holds a bachelor's degree in psychology from East Tennessee State University, and is currently studying for her MSW.

Stage survived two suicide attempts: one as a teenager, and one in 2006, at the end of an abusive relationship with a partner. She lost friends to suicide and witnessed the aftermath of a suicide death. These experiences propelled her to begin work on Live Through This in 2010.

== Activism ==
Stage is known mainly for her work around suicide attempt survivors, but is also outspoken about her experiences with infertility and pregnancy loss.

In 2019, Congresswoman Susan Wild (PA) invited Stage to take part in a roundtable discussion on Capitol Hill called "The Rippling Impact of Suicide", alongside Congresswoman Wild, former NFL player Fred Stokes, and representatives from the suicidology and psychiatry fields. Speaker of the House Nancy Pelosi provided opening remarks and Mike Schlossberg (PA House of Representatives) moderated the discussion.

== Live Through This ==
Live Through This is a series of portraits and true stories of suicide attempt survivors across the United States. Stage launched the project in 2010, and began interviewing attempt survivors and making portraits in 2011. The inspiration for Live Through This came out of the silence surrounding the experience of suicide attempts. Stage said, "In the years after my most recent attempt in 2006, it felt like I was alone in what I'd been through. I didn't know anyone else who was open about having attempted suicide and lived; all I could find online were statistics, and a handful of anonymous stories wrapped with happy endings like neat little bows. They lacked the warmth of human idiosyncrasy. I couldn't connect." Live Through This gives suicide attempt survivors a platform to talk openly about their experiences with suicidal thoughts and actions. The narratives, which are transcribed and edited for readability, are accompanied by portraits and the survivors' full names. Survivors who have shared their stories represent a broad age range (19 to 69); a variety of socioeconomic, professional, and faith backgrounds; a breadth of trauma and mental health experiences; as well as folks from Black, brown, Latinx, Indigenous, and LGBTQ+ communities. Stage has interviewed and photographed nearly 200 suicide attempt survivors across the country.

Live Through This is used as a training and educational tool in crisis call centers and graduate clinical programs. Stage speaks about Live Through This at suicide prevention events and universities nationwide. Stage and Live Through This played a role in inspiring Mike Faist's development of the character of Connor Murphy for Tony Award-winning Broadway musical, Dear Evan Hansen. Stage also centers her lived experience of suicidality in her consulting work and collaborations with researchers.

In support of her work with Live Through This, Stage has appeared on Finding Hope: Battling America's Suicide Crisis, a CNN Town Hall with Anderson Cooper; CBS This Morning with Gayle King; Vice News; CBS Evening News and more. Live Through This has received coverage from The New York Times, People, Upworthy, Time and more.

== Suicide 'n' Stuff ==
Stage previously produced and co-hosted the video podcast Suicide 'n' Stuff, with colleague Jess Stohlmann-Rainey. The final episode aired on May 4, 2021.

== Personal life ==
Stage lives in Philadelphia. She experienced infertility and underwent both intrauterine insemination, IVF, and a miscarriage before conceiving her daughter. She experienced depression and suicidal thoughts during pregnancy. Her ex-wife, who also experienced infertility, carried their son.

Stage was one of the first queer people in New York to marry under the Marriage Equality Act, and one of the first to divorce.

== Awards ==
- American Association of Suicidology Transforming Lived Experience Award, 2017
- SXSW Community Service Award, 2017
- Investigation Discovery's Inspire a Difference Everyday Hero Award, 2017
- SAMHSA Voice Award, 2015
- Cookie Gant and Bill Compton LGBT Leadership Award, 2014

== Filmography ==
Dese'Rae appears as the main character in Lisa Klein's 2017 documentary, The S Word. She also appears in Nate Townsend's 2020 documentary, Wake Up: Stories from the Frontlines of Suicide Prevention.
