= My Fever Broke =

EP by Rasputina
- Released: August 20, 2002
- Length: 32:51
- Label: Instinct
- Producer: Mitch Goldman

Rasputina chronology
Cabin Fever (2002)	My Fever Broke (2002)	The Lost & Found, 2nd Edition (2003)

Professional ratings
Review scores
Source	Rating
Allmusic	2.5/5 stars

My Fever Broke is an EP by Rasputina, released in 2002 on Instinct Records. The track "The Fox in the Snow" is a Belle and Sebastian cover.

== Track listing ==
No.	Title	Length
1.	"At the State Fair With a White Trash Sucker"	4:36
2.	"SweetWaterKill" (Soft Kill R-Mix)	4:08
3.	"State Fair" (Tweaker Remix)	3:33
4.	"AntiqueHighHeelRedDollShoes"	2:14
5.	"Deep in the Sweetwater"	3:51
6.	"The Fox in the Snow"	3:17
7.	"State Fair" (Tweaker Ambient Remix)	3:42
8.	"My Orphanage" (multimedia track)	5:00

== Notes ==
- Tracks 1 and 5 remixed by Joseph Bishara
- Track 2 remixed by Dimitri Tikovoï
- Tracks 3 and 7 remixed by Chris Vrenna
