= Ultra Vivid Scene (album) =

Studio album by Ultra Vivid Scene
- Released: October 31, 1988
- Recorded: May–July 1988
- Studio: Ben Munve's Studio, New York
- Genre: Alternative rock
- Length: 48:19
- Language: English
- Label: 4AD
- Producer: Kurt Ralske

Ultra Vivid Scene chronology
Ultra Vivid Scene (1988)	Joy 1967–1990 (1990)

Singles from Ultra Vivid Scene
- 1. "She Screamed" Released: August 22, 1988; 2. "Mercy Seat" Released: April 24, 1989

Professional ratings
Review scores
Source	Rating
AllMusic	3/5 stars

Ultra Vivid Scene is the debut album by Ultra Vivid Scene, released in 1988. Kurt Ralske was the writer, producer, and sole performer.

== Track listing ==
All tracks are written by Kurt Ralske.

No.	Title	Length
1.	"She Screamed"	2:19
2.	"Crash"	3:29
3.	"You Didn't Say Please"	3:46
4.	"Lynn-Marie #2"	3:17
5.	"Nausea"	3:12
6.	"Mercy Seat"	4:05
7.	"A Dream of Love"	4:00
8.	"Extra CD Track" (bonus track on CD versions only)	1:27
9.	"Lynn-Marie #1"	2:35
10.	"This Isn't Real"	2:22
11.	"The Whore of God"	3:06
12.	"Bloodline"	4:01
13.	"A Kiss and a Slap"	2:33
14.	"How Did It Feel"	2:52
15.	"Hail Mary"	4:37
16.	"Mercy Seat" (12" version; bonus track on US CD only)	6:35

== Singles ==
- "She Screamed" (August 22, 1988)
  1. "She Screamed"
  2. "Walkin' After Midnight" (Patsy Cline cover)
  3. "Not in Love (Hit by a Truck)"
  4. "You Know It All" (on CD single only)
- "Mercy Seat" (April 24, 1989)
  1. "Mercy Seat" (12" version)
  2. "Codine" (Buffy Sainte-Marie cover)
  3. "H Like in Heaven"
  4. "Mercy Seat" (album version)

== Personnel ==
- Kurt Ralske – vocals, instrumentation, producer, engineer
