= Perplexions =

Studio album by Melora Creager
- Released: December 4, 2006
- Length: 20:57
- Label: Filthy Bonnet Co.
- Producer: Melora Creager

Perplexions is an album by Melora Creager, frontwoman and founder of the band Rasputina, which was released on December 4, 2006, through her own record label, Filthy Bonnet Recording Co.

== Track listing ==
No.	Title	Length
1.	"Girl Lunar Explorer"	3:29
2.	"Warbots"	3:22
3.	"Sky Is Falling"	3:07
4.	"Border Village"	1:48
5.	"Krakatowa"	3:27
6.	"American Girl" (Tom Petty cover)	3:22
7.	"Itinerant Airship"	2:22
Total length:		20:57

== Song Inspirations ==
- "Lunar Girl Explorer", according to Creager, was "inspired by the satellite Gallileo's [sic] explorations of Saturn's moon, Titan", although she was likely referring to the Huygens probe, which touched down on Titan on January 14, 2005, as the Galileo spacecraft was never involved in such exploration.
- "Warbots" is about the U.S. Government's real life attempts to make robot soldiers. The lyric "the lawyers tell me that there are no prohibitions against robots making life or death decisions", credited in the song to "Mr. Johnson", is indeed a direct quote from Gordon Johnson of the Pentagon's Joint Forces Command.
- "Krakatowa" was described by Creager "a tale of Polynesian spite and revenge."

== Personnel ==
- Melora Creager - Artwork, Cello, Drums, Dulcimer, Engineer, Programming, Vocals
- Jonathon Tebeest - Piano
