= Crash (UK band) =

- Origin: New York, United States
- Genre: Indie rock
- Years active: 1985–1987
- Labels: Remorse, Justine
- Past members: Mark Dumais; Kurt Ralske; Bill Carey; Adam Wright; Byron Guthrie; Joss Cope; Brian Bendlin; Bob Huff; David Bowman; Doug Rollins; Brian Foster

Crash were an indie rock band formed in 1984 in New York City, centered on frontman-songwriter Mark Dumais, who took their name from the J. G. Ballard novel. The band moved to London in 1987. Crash released three singles and an album; several former members went on to form the bands Ultra Vivid Scene, John Moore's Expressway, and Something Pretty Beautiful.

The band's line-up was Mark Dumais (vocals, guitar), Kurt Ralske (guitar, also of Nothing But Happiness), Bill Carey (guitar, formerly of Centrics), Adam Wright (bass), and Byron Guthrie (drums). They debuted with a 12" single, "Don't Look Now" in November 1986 on the Remorse label, followed the same month by another 12", "Almost". Their only album, I Feel Fine, was released in February 1987. A final single, "Bright Coloured Lights" was released in August 1987. When the group split up, Ralske formed Ultra Vivid Scene, Guthrie joined John Moore's Expressway and later joined Ralske in Ultra Vivid Scene, and Carey formed Something Pretty Beautiful. Joss Cope, brother of Julian Cope, played bass in the last lineup of the band. Mark Dumais signed to the Creation Records label under the name Tangerine, releasing an album in 1990. Dumais died of AIDS in the US in April 1992.

== Discography ==
=== Singles ===
- "Don't Look Now" (1986) Remorse (UK)/Justine (US)
- "Almost" (1986) Remorse
- "Bright Coloured Lights" (1987) Remorse

=== Albums ===
- I Feel Fine (1987) Remorse

=== Covers ===
- Ultra Vivid Scene, "Don't Look Now (Now!)," Blood and Thunder (1993) 4AD
- Moth Wranglers, "Don't Look Now," Never Mind the Context (2001) Magnetic
- Bobine, (13 song album) I Had Fun Tonight - Songs by Mark Dumais and Crash, (2008) Beauty Bark Records
- LD Beghtol has performed multiple Crash songs live, including: "International Velvet" with The Three Terrors (Stephin Merritt, Beghtol, and Dudley Klute); "I've Got It in My Head" with Shirley Simms at a chickfactor soiree at Fez (NYC), in 2000; and "Everything Under the Sun" and "Don't Look Now" at the chickfactor 20th-anniversary parties in Washington, DC and Brooklyn in 2011 with members of Black Tambourine, Chessie and others.
