= How We Quit the Forest =

Studio album by Rasputina
- Released: August 4, 1998
- Genre: Gothic rock; Chamber punk
- Label: Columbia
- Producer: Chris Vrenna; Melora Creager

Rasputina chronology
Transylvanian Regurgitations (1997)	How We Quit the Forest (1998)	The Lost & Found, 1st Edition (2001)

How We Quit the Forest is the second studio album by American rock band Rasputina, released in 1998 by Columbia Records. After years of being out of print, it was re-released by frontwoman Melora Creager on her own label, Filthy Bonnet Recording co., on CD and, for the first time, vinyl in 2011. Former Nine Inch Nails drummer Chris Vrenna produced the album and provided many of its sounds and samples.

== Promotion ==
The first track from the album, "The Olde Headboard", was released in 1998 as a promotional-only single prior to the release of the album. Manufactured in both CD and 12" vinyl editions, with a slight difference in track listings between them, the single contains a number of remixes of the song. Around this time, Sony Music Entertainment also produced a video for the song, directed by Lisa Rubisch. Conceptualized as "a haunting anxiety dream where our heroines must fulfill impossible tasks," in the video, Creager cries sitting among dozens of teacups and kisses a taxidermy goat, Julia Kent pins corsets to an infinite clothesline, and the band plays cello on a wooden stage in a forest near a German-fairy-tale-style cabin.

A limited promotional-only long box edition of the full album was also manufactured, prior to its wide release. This version contains a "story-book" with drawings and collage-style art put together by Creager.

On October 15, 1998, the band appeared as the musical guest on Late Night with Conan O'Brien to promote the album, performing the song "LeechWife".

== Critical reception ==
Professional ratings
Review scores
Source	Rating
AllMusic	3/5 stars

Tim Sheridan of AllMusic commented "This band deals in what can only be called chamber-goth: a grungey cello-driven rock that is perfect for those nights when you just want to feel creepy. While the sound is original and sometimes very effective, the overwrought vocal vibrato gets tedious." In a review for CMJ, Kurt Reighley commented, "Rasputina shoehorns the distinctive sonorous properties of its instruments, plus Creager’s lyrical fetishes (including, but hardly limited to, death, madness and exorcism), into pop song formats with all the grace of a linebacker squeezing into his first pair of stiletto heels. And the outcomes are pretty similar, too: precarious and uncomfortable, yet weirdly alluring." Clarendon Lavorich of Lollipop Magazine said, "All in all, How We Quit The Forest surpasses even their debut in innovation and originality. Thus, no one is going to like it. But I do."

== Track listing ==
All tracks are written by Melora Creager (except where noted)

No.	Title	Length
1.	"The Olde HeadBoard"	2:51
2.	"LeechWife"	3:12
3.	"You Don't Own Me" (David White/John Madara)	2:24
4.	"The New Zero"	3:40
5.	"Rose K."	2:48
6.	"DwarfStar"	2:41
7.	"Sign of the Zodiac"	3:46
8.	"TrenchMouth"	3:10
9.	"Herb Girls of Birkenau"	3:02
10.	"MayFly"	2:38
11.	"Christian Soldiers"	1:31
12.	"Things I'm Gonna Do"	3:13
13.	"Diamond Mind" (Creager/Julia Kent)	1:11
14.	"How We Quit the Forest"	2:36
15.	"Watch T.V."	3:07

A bouns track, "The Olde Headboard (Weathered Mix)" was also included as an unlisted track on the 2011 CD reissue.

== Credits and personnel ==
Rasputina

- Melora Creager – Artwork, cello, producer, vocals
- Julia Kent – Cello
- Agnieszka Rybska – Cello

Production and personnel

- Chris Vrenna – Drums, producer, programming
- Critter – Engineer, mixing
- Annette Cisneros – Assistant Engineer, Mixing Assistant
- Wade Goeke – Assistant engineer, mixing assistant
- Stephen Marcussen – mastering
- Rick Hackley – Mixing Assistant
- Smoove Tone – Mixing Assistant
- Don C. Tyler – Digital editing
- Kiku – Art direction
- Brian Welch – photography
