= Melora a la Basilica =

Live album by Rasputina
- Released: December 30, 2008
- Label: Filthy Bonnet Recording Co.

Rasputina chronology
Oh Perilous World! (2007)	Melora a la Basilica (2008)	The Willow Tree Triptych (2009)

Packaging
- The album's unique packaging including metal tin cover, the 8-panel insert of liner notes and the CD graphic.

Melora a la Basilica is a 1000 unit collector's edition live recording made by American cello rock band Rasputina in Basilica Industria in Hudson, NY, "a behemoth of a defunct glue factory". It is a collection of previous Rasputina songs reworked with new second chair cellist Daniel DeJesus and covers of songs by Goldfrapp, Pearl Jam and the Sweeney Todd and A Clockwork Orange soundtracks. The sound and atmosphere of the record was patterned after the recitals given earlier in the year by Creager and DeJesus.

== Track listing ==
1. "Clowns" (Goldfrapp) – 4:12
2. "American Girl" (Tom Petty) – 2:56
3. "Wicked Dickie" (Adapted from "If It Wasn't for Dicky" by Lead Belly) – 2:28
4. "I Want to Marry a Lighthouse Keeper" (A Clockwork Orange) – 1:03
5. "Rose K." – 2:56
6. "Why Don't You Do Right?" (Kansas Joe McCoy) – 1:59
7. "Rusty the Skatemaker" – 3:28
8. "Green Finch/Johanna" (Sweeney Todd) – 3:39
9. "Girl Lunar Explorer" – 3:43
10. "Soon Forget" (Pearl Jam) – 1:41
11. "Identity Tokens / Wicked Dickie (hidden)" – 9:59

== Personnel ==
- Melora Creager – cello, vocals
- Daniel DeJesus – 2nd chair cello
