= Colours Are Brighter =

Colours are Brighter

Compilation album by Various Artists
- Released: 16 October 2006
- Genre: Indie pop
- Label: Rough Trade Records

Professional ratings
Review scores
| Source | Rating |
|---|---|
| Drowned in Sound | 7/10 stars |
| The List | (favorable) |

Colours Are Brighter is a charity record which was released on Rough Trade Records on 16 October 2006, all proceeds going to Save the Children. The CD features 13 songs aimed at children, by some of the UK's biggest indie pop bands, and was released with a set price of £9.99. Currently the album is not available to purchase on iTunes, but six songs are available on iTunes from separate albums. They are Skeleton Bang, David Wainwright’s Feet, The Monkeys Are Breaking Out The Zoo, Mud and The Big Ol Bug Is The New Baby Now. The rest are not available to download.

== Track listing ==
1. "Go Go Ninja Dinosaur" - Four Tet featuring Princess Watermelon
2. "A Skeleton Bang" - Rasputina
3. "Jackie Jackson" - Franz Ferdinand
4. "I Am An Astronaut" - Snow Patrol
5. "Three Cheers for Pooh, Cottleston Pie, Piglet Ho" - The Divine Comedy
6. "The King & I" - The Kooks
7. "David Wainwright's Feet" - Half Man Half Biscuit
8. "Tidy Up Tidy Up" - The Barcelona Pavilion
9. "Our Dog is Getting Older Now" - Jonathan Richman
10. "The Monkeys Are Breaking Out the Zoo" - Belle and Sebastian
11. "Mud" - Ivor Cutler Trio
12. "The Big Ol' Bug Is the New Baby Now" - The Flaming Lips
13. "Night Baking" - Kathryn Williams
