= Melora Creager =

American musician

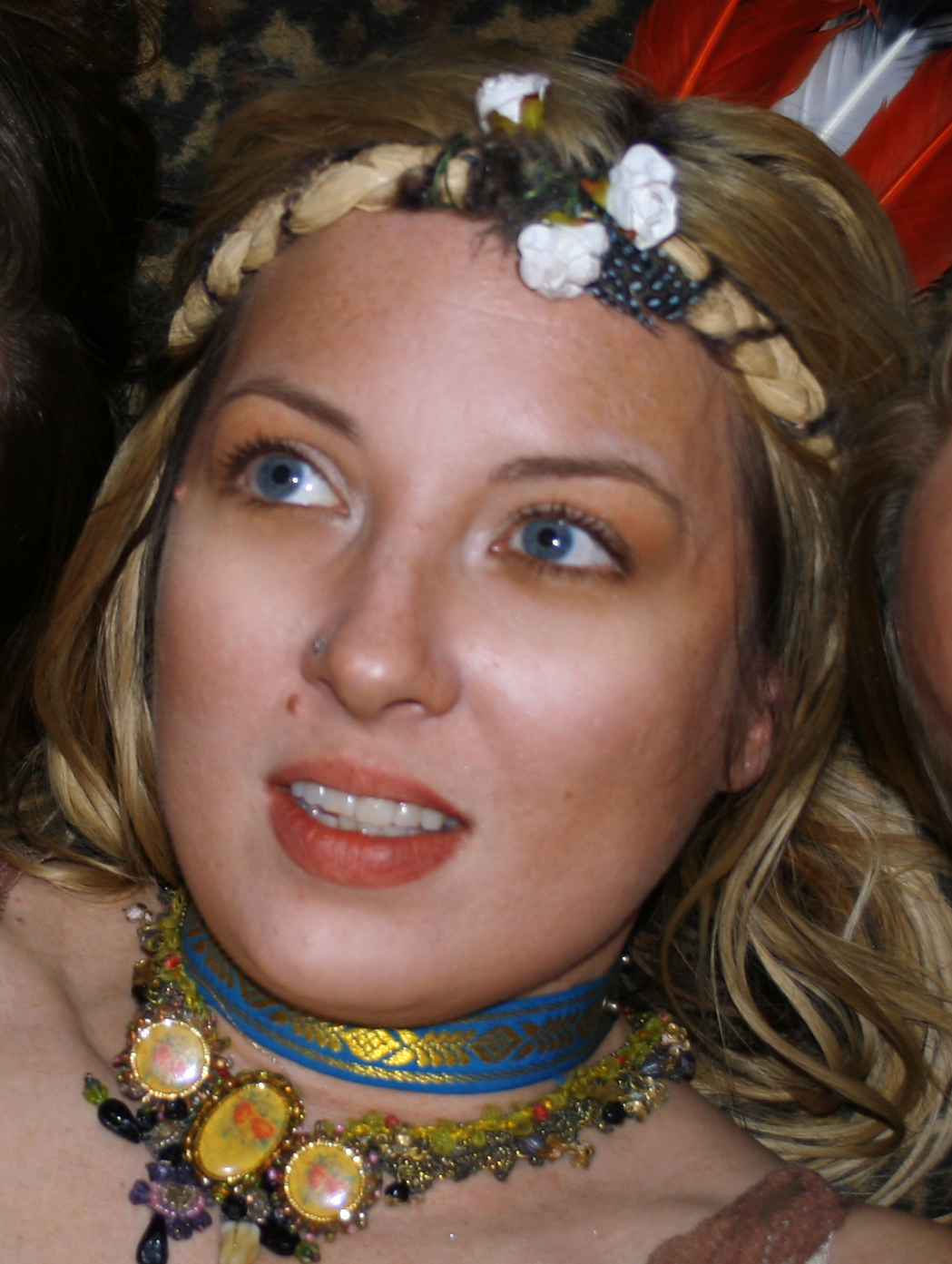
- Creager in 2007

Background information
- Born: March 25, 1966 (age 60); Kansas City, Missouri, United States
- Occupations: Singer, songwriter, musician, cellist
- Instruments: Vocals; cello; dulcimer; piano; banjo
- Years active: 1989–present
- Labels: Filthy Bonnet Recording Co.; Instinct Records; Columbia Records
- Member of: Rasputina
- Formerly of: Nirvana; Ultra Vivid Scene

Melora Creager (born March 25, 1966) is an American cellist, singer-songwriter, performing artist and founder of the rock band Rasputina.

== Early life, beginnings and Rasputina ==
Born in Kansas City, Missouri, and adopted by a graphic designer and physicist, Creager was raised in Emporia, Kansas. She started studying music at the age of 5, and at age 9 began playing the cello. As a child she was also a member of the Wichita Youth Symphony. Though she briefly quit playing in her teen years, after Creager moved to the east coast to attend Philadelphia College of Art and Parsons School of Design, she was convinced by friends to take it up again. In the late 1980s she played with the New York indie rock band Ultra Vivid Scene. In 1991, Creager founded alternative cello ensemble Rasputina by writing a manifesto and placing a want-ad in the Village Voice stating "electric cellists wanted". Cellist/composer Julia Kent was the first respondent. Rasputina performed regularly at NYC venues such as CBGB's Gallery, Brownie's and Fez before being signed to Columbia Records in 1996, for whom they subsequently made two albums. Since 2005, Rasputina and Creager have released their music under her own label, Filthy Bonnet Recording Co.

Creager makes unique use of historical events and figures in her lyrics and themes. Inspirations include the Triangle Shirtwaist Factory fire of 1911, Howard Hughes, Rose Kennedy, victims of Josef Mengele, Emily Dickinson, Pitcairn Island, and Columbia County, New York. Combining history and humor in song-form and spoken-word pieces, Creager is also unique in exploring women's history through pop music.

Through more than eight albums and frequent touring, Creager through Rasputina, with varying members, has been an originator of and influence on such movements as freak folk and steampunk.

Creager has created all of Rasputina's album covers, except for The Lost & Found which was designed by artist Ryan Obermeyer.

== Other work and collaborations ==
Creager played cello with Nirvana on the European leg of their In Utero world tour in 1994, including the band's final show in Munich. According to Creager, Kurt Cobain personally called to offer her the job. She has said that touring with the band, as well as Cobain's suicide, made her realize that she found the idea of large-scale fame unappealing, stating, "Fame is just so unnatural. Fame kills and it was valuable to learn that early on," and "It was an amazing experience but I couldn't be happier being where I am now." In 2014, in honor of the 20th anniversary of Cobain's death, Creager launched Dedication Compilation, what she referred to as "a collective free arts release". The Compilation, a webpage containing poems, songs and art in memory of "those we've lost to suicide or overdose", included contributions from Melissa Auf der Maur and John Cafiero.

Creager's debut solo album Perplexions, was released in 2006.

Creager has been a frequent collaborator of Voltaire, playing cello on his albums Riding a Black Unicorn... (2011), Raised by Bats (2014) and Heart Shaped Wound (2017). Creager was a featured artist on the song "Into The Black" by English band Birdeatsbaby on their 2014 album The Bullet Within. She was also credited as "additional cello" on the soundtracks to Darren Lynn Bousman and Terrance Zdunich's films Repo! The Genetic Opera (2008) and The Devil's Carnival (2012).

From 1988 to 1996, Creager was employed as a jewelry designer for Erickson Beamon, creating costume jewelry for Anna Sui, Donna Karan, Barney's New York, and Vogue magazine. She continues her relationship with Anna Sui, occasionally designing fashion show invitations and T-shirts.

Creager also has a short list of acting and film credits. In 1989 she briefly appeared as a member of the fictional Finger Lakes Trio in the film Longtime Companion. In 2003, Creager starred in the short film "On My Knees", by filmmaker Kim Wood, as Hannah Cullwick, whose diaries the film is based upon. Creager also wrote the music for the film, which appears on the Rasputina compilation album Great American Gingerbread. In 2010, Creager and Rasputina were the subject of a documentary entitled Under the Corset, created by podcaster and then-future Rasputina drummer Dawn Miceli. Creager also contributed additional voices to the 2018 pilot of the Adult Swim animated series Tigtone.

== Personal life ==
Creager has two daughters. She lives in Hudson, New York.

At some point in 2015, Creager became the victim of identity theft when her computer was hacked into and subsequently corrupted to the point of being unusable. Processing this experience, and the "mental breakdown" it caused her, became much of the inspiration for the 2015 Rasputina album Unknown. She has since been diagnosed with bipolar disorder.

== Discography ==
Solo albums

- Perplexions - Filthy Bonnet Recording Co., 2006
- Raw Silk (3 Covers) (EP) - Filthy Bonnet Recording Co., 2012
- Fa La La - Filthy Bonnet Recording Co., 2015

with Ultra Vivid Scene

- Ultra Vivid Scene - 1988
- Mercy Seat (EP) - 1989
- Rev - 1992

with Rasputina

- Transylvanian Concubine/The Vaulted Eel, Lesson No. 6 (promo) - Oculus, 1993
- Three (3) (promo) - Columbia, 1994
- Thanks for the Ether - Columbia, 1996
- Three Lil' Nothin's (promo) - Columbia, 1996
- Transylvanian Regurgitations (EP) - Columbia, 1997
- How We Quit the Forest - Columbia, 1998
- The Olde HeadBoard (promo) - Columbia, 1998
- The Lost & Found (self-released limited edition EP) - 2001
- Cabin Fever! - Instinct, 2002
- My Fever Broke (EP) - Instinct, 2002
- The Lost & Found (second edition EP) - Instinct, 2003
- Frustration Plantation - Instinct, 2004
- A Radical Recital (live) - Filthy Bonnet Recording Co., 2005
- Oh Perilous World (Vinyl LP, CD & Limited edition CD) - Filthy Bonnet Recording Co., 2007
- Melora a la Basilica (Limited Edition Live EP), 2008
- The Willow Tree Triptych (Limited Edition EP), 2009
- Ancient Cross-Dressing Songs - A Special Recording For Brooklyn (Limited Edition EP), 2009
- Sister Kinderhook - Filthy Bonnet Recording Co., 2010
- Great American Gingerbread - Filthy Bonnet Recording Co., 2011
- Unknown - Filthy Bonnet Recording Co., 2015

Guest contributions

- Ego, Opinion, Art & Commerce by the Goo Goo Dolls - cello - 2001
- Gutterflower by the Goo Goo Dolls - cello - 2002
- With the Lights Out by Nirvana - appears only on the song "Jesus Doesn't Want Me for a Sunbeam" - 2004
- Repo! The Genetic Opera Soundtrack - additional cello - 2008
- Riding a Black Unicorn... by Voltaire - cello - 2011
- The Devil's Carnival Soundtrack - additional cello - 2012
- The Bullet Within by Birdeatsbaby - featured on the song "Into the Black" - 2014
- Raised by Bats by Voltaire - cello - 2014
- Heart Shaped Wound by Voltaire - cello - 2017
