= Kurt Ralske =

American visual artist and musician (born 1967)

- Genres: Indie rock
- Instruments: Vocals, guitar
- Years active: 1983–2001 (as musician); 2001–present (as visual artist)
- Labels: 4AD, Columbia
- Formerly of: Ultra Vivid Scene
- Website: KurtRalske.com

Kurt Ralske (born 1967 in New York City) is an American visual artist and musician. He is the former singer and guitarist in alternative rock band Ultra Vivid Scene.

== Biography ==
During the mid-eighties, Ralske was a guitarist in the bands Nothing But Happiness and Crash.

In the late eighties and early-nineties he released three albums as Ultra Vivid Scene. After his last album under the Ultra Vivid Scene moniker, he produced, engineered, and performed on numerous albums for a variety of artists, including Ivy, Rasputina, Charles Douglas and Los Planetas.

In 1999 he self-released two albums on his miau-miau label, one under his own name Kyrie Eleison and the other <<amorpheus>> as Cathars. In 2001 he released another two albums, Kurt Ralske Amor. 0 + 01, and as Cathars Early Bells and Voices. The Amor. 0 + 01 album featured several digital video clips.

Since then he has focused on digital video. His video installations and performances are created exclusively with his own custom software and his work has been exhibited internationally, including at the Guggenheim Bilbao, Los Angeles Museum of Contemporary Art, and the Montreal Museum of Contemporary Art.

Ralske programmed and co-designed a 9-channel video installation that is permanently in the lobby of the MoMA in NYC. In 2007, he received a Rockefeller Foundation Media Arts Fellowship grant. In 2003, his work received First Prize at the Transmediale International Media Art Festival in Berlin, as a member of the video ensemble 242.pilots. He is also the author/programmer of Auvi, a video software environment.

In 2007, Ralske completed the interactive video accompaniment for Mathew Rosenblum's RedDust Opera.

Ralske is currently on the faculty of the School of the Museum of Fine Arts, Boston. He was formerly a Visiting Professor and Resident Artist at the Digital + Media Graduate Program of the Rhode Island School of Design, and was also a faculty member of the School of Visual Arts, in New York City, in the graduate program in Computer Art.

== Discography ==
=== Kurt Ralske ===
- amor.0+01 (Subrosa)
- kyrie eleison (Miau International)

=== Cathars ===
- locale (Computer Music Journal)
- Early Bells + Voices (Atomic)
- <amorpheus> (Miau International)

=== Kurt Ralske / Keith Fullerton Whitman ===
- K+K (Reckankreuzung)

== DVD releases ==
=== 242.pilots ===
- 242.pilots live in Bruxelles (Carpark Records)
