= Thanks for the Ether =

Studio album by Rasputina
- Released: August 6, 1996
- Recorded: Sear Sound, New York City
- Genre: Alternative rock; cello rock
- Length: 55:45
- Label: Columbia
- Producer: Jimmy Boyle, Melora Creager

Rasputina chronology
Thanks for the Ether (1996)	Transylvanian Regurgitations (1997)

Thanks for the Ether is the debut studio album by American rock band Rasputina, released on August 6, 1996, on Columbia Records. The album was recorded at Sear Sound Recording Studio in New York City, and produced by Jimmy Boyle and Melora Creager. The cover art and packaging was designed by Creager. The album did not chart in any country and it did not sell many copies. It contains an eclectic collection of songs and spoken-word narration. It is also known for introducing the band's pioneering use of distortion effects pedals on their cellos, single-handedly launching the underground genre known as cello rock.

On October 1, 1996, the band appeared as the musical guest on Late Night with Conan O'Brien to promote the album. In 1998, the track "Transylvanian Concubine" was featured in the season 2 episode of Buffy The Vampire Slayer, "Surprise".

== Critical reception ==
Professional ratings
Review scores
Source	Rating
AllMusic	4.5/5 stars
The Boston Phoenix	3/4 stars
Deseret News	3/4 stars
The Hamilton Spectator	4/4
Knoxville News-Sentinel	3.5/5 stars
Music Central Online	4/5 stars
MusicHound Rock	5/5 stars

In a review for AllMusic, Vincent Jefferies called the album "a rare accomplishment", saying "If only more mope rockers, shoegazers, death metalers, and other dour stylists could be so clever, their music would become many times more listenable," and "Rasputina paint a completely new gothic landscape on this debut, and fans of the genre or anything dark and artful simply must own it." In a review for CMJ, Douglas Wolk praised the band's "sly humor and self-awareness", and said of the album, "Thanks For The Ether has a couple of conceptual misfires, but even the lesser stuff is pleasingly unlike anything else: they err on the side of adventurousness, which is always a good idea."

== Track listing ==
All tracks are written by Melora Creager (except where noted).

No.	Title	Writer(s)	Length
1.	"My Little Shirtwaist Fire"		2:30
2.	"Stumpside"		4:01
3.	"Nozzle"		1:55
4.	"Transylvanian Concubine"		2:47
5.	"Why Don't You Do Right?"	McCoy/Morand	2:21
6.	"Mr. E. Leon Rauis"		3:26
7.	"The Donner Party"		2:01
8.	"Endomorph"		2:40
9.	"Brand New Key"	Melanie Safka	2:13
10.	"Crybabies"		3:21
11.	"Howard Hughes"		3:14
12.	"Sister Sleep"		2:59
13.	"Five Fleas"		1:06
14.	"Any Old Actress"		3:54
15.	"Dig Ophelia"		2:59
16.	"Kate Moss"		1:33
17.	"Rusty the Skatemaker"		3:36
18.	"Trust All-Stars/Vertrauen Alles Sternen (hidden track)"		9:09

== Personnel ==
- Melora Creager – Cello, vocals, producer, art direction
- Julia Kent – Cello
- Carpella Parvo – Cello
- Norm Block – Drums
- Jimmy Boyle – Producer
- Michael Brauer – Mixing
- Greg Calbi – Mastering
- Greg Gordon – Engineer
- Dave Shiffman – Engineer
