= Cello rock =

Subgenre of rock music

- Stylistic origins: Heavy metal music; classical music; baroque pop; art rock; thrash metal; symphonic metal
- Cultural origins: 1970s, United Kingdom

Other topics
- Baroque rock

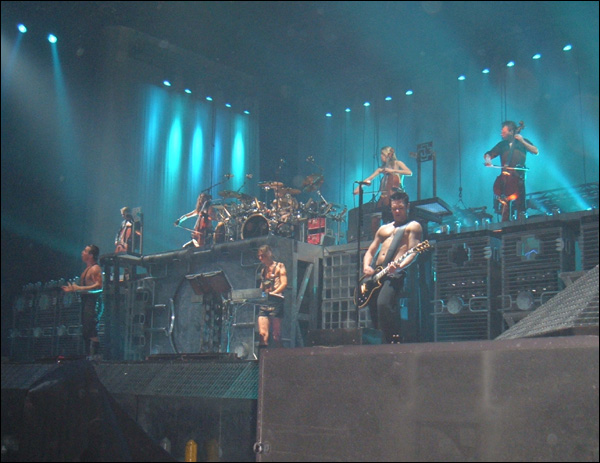
Apocalyptica accompanying Rammstein in concert

Cello rock is a subgenre of rock music characterized by the use of cellos (as well as other bowed string instruments such as the violin and viola) as primary instruments, alongside or in place of more traditional rock instruments such as electric guitars, electric bass guitars, and drum sets.

Cellos, often in groups of three or more, are used to create a sound, rhythm, and texture similar to that of familiar rock music, but distinctly reshaped by the unique timbres and more traditional genres of the cello (in particular) and other string instruments used. Cellos and other stringed instruments are often amplified and/or modified electronically, and they are often played in a manner imitative of the sound of electric guitars. They are often combined with other elements typical of rock music such as rock-style vocals and drumming.

Cello rock can trace its beginnings to the 1971 self-titled debut, known as No Answer in the US, by The Electric Light Orchestra, which featured rock songs arranged for cellos, and the subsequent tour consisted of a standard rock band augmented by four cellos. Jeff Lynne made a return with this format using three cellos for their 2001 comeback album Zoom and its subsequent but cancelled tour.

In 1992, Rasputina formed in New York City, blending baroque cello stylings with alternative rock songs. Their 1996 debut album of original music, Thanks for the Ether, introduced this hybrid approach, while their 1998 follow-up, How We Quit the Forest, incorporated heavy metal distortion and rock drums to create one of the earliest fully realized examples of distorted cello rock.

Apocalyptica, which released their first album, Plays Metallica by Four Cellos, in 1996, originally used only cellos but has since added drums and bass and sometimes vocals. Starting in 2011, the duo 2Cellos began releasing covers of many rock standards, such as AC/DC's "Thunderstruck", and undertaking tours.

The cello was actively used in Wednesday television series (2022-...) both for classic and rock compositions, as the heroine's personal music instrument and leading or ensemble instrument in some of soundtrack songs, specifically Nothing Else Matters by Apocalyptica, Sweet Dreams by Hampton String Quartet, Losing My Religion by GnuS Cello, cello arrangements for Paint It Black and (Don't Fear) The Reaper.

== See also ==
- Symphonic rock
- Cello in popular music
