= Julia Kent =

Canadian cellist and composer

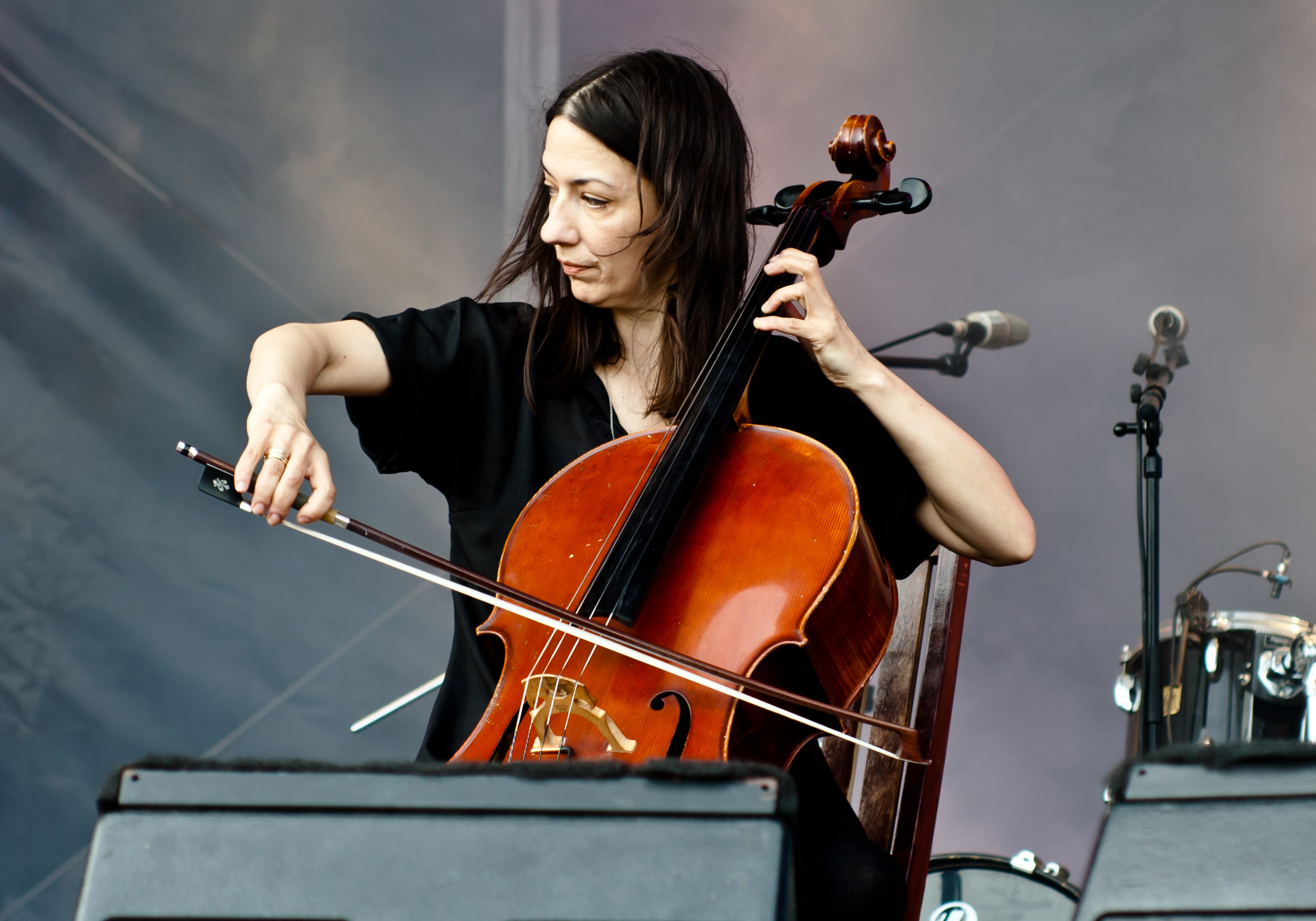

Background information
- Origin: Vancouver, British Columbia, Canada
- Occupation: Musician
- Instrument: Cello
- Years active: 1989–present
- Labels: The Leaf Label; Tin Angel; Important

Julia Kent is a Canadian cellist and composer from Vancouver, Canada, and based in New York City, United States. She has performed as a member of Rasputina and with Anohni and the Johnsons.

== Musical career ==
Kent creates music using looped cello, found sounds, and electronics. In 2007, she released her first solo album, Delay, on Important Records. An EP, Last Day in July, was released in 2010, and a second full-length record, Green and Grey, in 2011, on Tin Angel.

In 2013 Kent moved to The Leaf Label, releasing her third solo album, Character, in March. Her album Asperities was released on Leaf on 30 October 2015. Kent spoke about the album in an interview, saying "I was thinking about the concept of difficulty. Whether in life or in nature—of conflict, of being troubled. The idea of friction. Also in geology, an asperity is some part of a faultline that doesn't move which can create an earthquake, which is quite an evocative concept ... In the music there is an inherent sense of dissonance; that things are too close for comfort. More generally, it seems like a particularly dark time in the world right now, and I think that definitely had an influence too".

Her composition "Dorval" was used in the 2008 film Trinidad, and in an episode of National Public Radio's Radiolab.

In 2011, her composition "Gardermoen," from Delay, was used in Paolo Sorrentino's movie This Must Be the Place.

She composed music for the Canadian documentary film The Boxing Girls of Kabul, the short film Birthplace, A Short History of Decay, and Oasis, which won Best Short Film at the Seville European Film Festival 2015.

She has also composed and performed music for theatre and dance, including productions by the Italian company Balletto Civile.

As a solo artist, she has appeared at Primavera Sound in Barcelona, Spain, the Meltdown festival in London, England, the Reeperbahn Festival in Hamburg, the CTM Festival in Berlin, Germany, the 24-Hour Drone in Hudson, New York, and the Unsound Festival in New York City.

== Discography ==
=== Solo work ===
- 2007 – Delay – Important Records
- 2010 – Last Day in July – Lento
- 2011 – Green and Grey – Tin Angel
- 2013 – Character – The Leaf Label
- 2015 – Asperities – The Leaf Label
- 2019 – Temporal – The Leaf Label

=== Film/TV scores ===
- 2012 – The Boxing Girls of Kabul – composer
- 2013 – A Short History of Decay – composer
- 2013 – Birthplace – composer
- 2014 – Oasis – composer
- 2019 – Twice Upon a Time – composer
- 2021 – Mrs D – composer
- 2021 – Stories From the Sea – composer
- 2024 – Dark My Light – composer

=== Work with Antony and the Johnsons ===
- 2005 – I Am a Bird Now – cello, string arrangement
- 2009 – The Crying Light – cello, string arrangement

=== Work with Rasputina ===
- 1996 – Thanks for the Ether – cello
- 1998 – How We Quit the Forest – cello, string arrangement
