= Instinct Records =

American electronic music record label

Instinct Records is a New York City electronic-music record label that first gained prominence in 1989. It is best known for releasing much of Moby's early work. Moby produced a number of tracks under various monikers so that in the early days, the label would appear to have a larger roster of acts. The label has several sublabels, which include Evolver, Instinct Ambient, Kickin Records US, Liquid Music, Shadow Records, and Sonic Records. It has also released records from artists such as Cabaret Voltaire, the Creatures (Siouxsie Sioux's second band), Sarah Cracknell, Rasputina, and Drum Club.

The best-known compilation series released on Instinct is This Is Acid Jazz. Some of the label's compilations featured material from the Fax +49-69/450464, em:t, and Ninja Tune record labels that had not been released in the U.S. It is now owned by Knitting Factory Records.

== See also ==
- List of record labels
