= Rasputina (band) =

American cello rock band

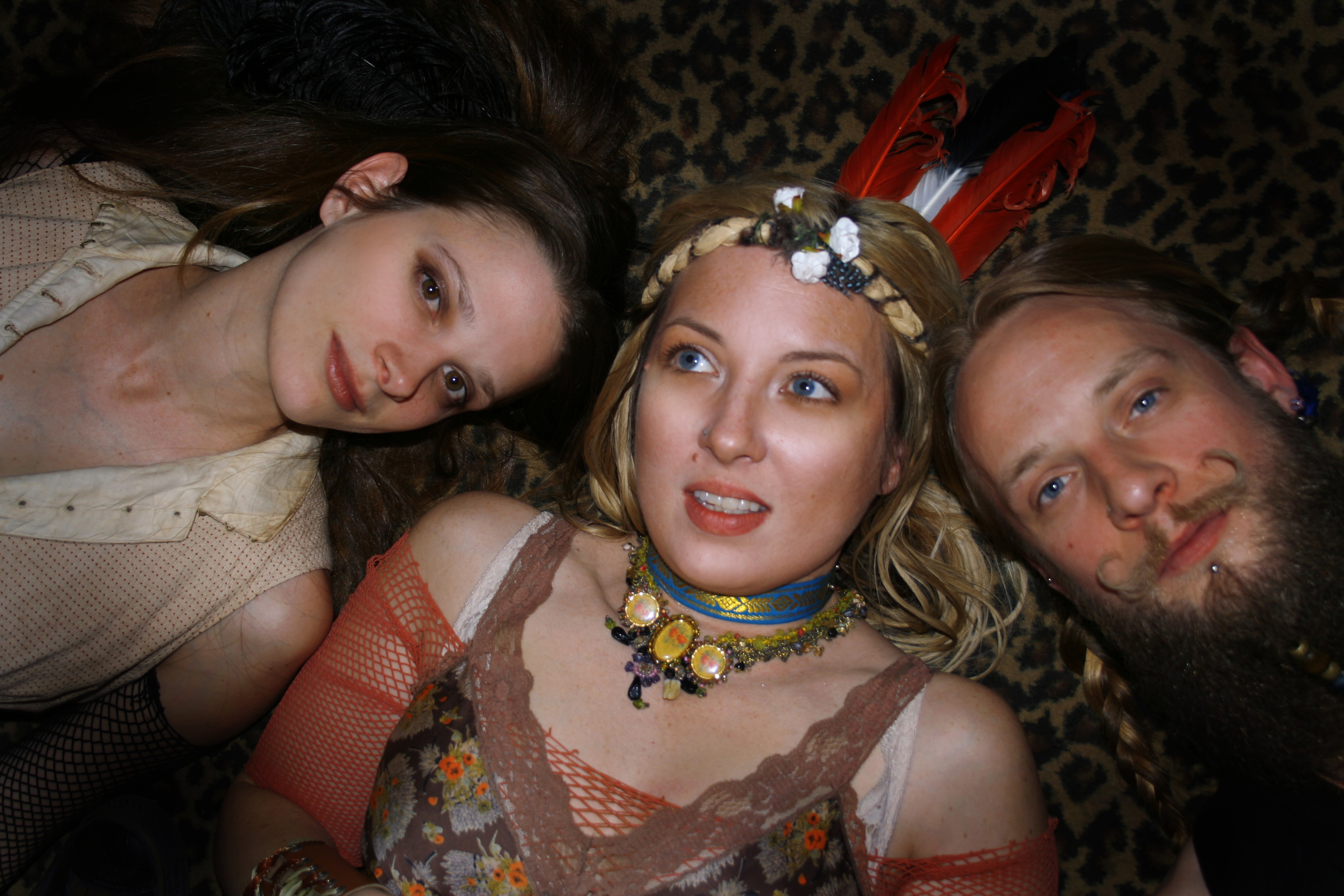
- Rasputina in 2007. From left to right: Sarah Bowman, Melora Creager, Jonathon TeBeest.

Background information
- Origin: Brooklyn, New York, U.S.
- Genres: Cello rock; chamber rock
- Years active: 1992–present
- Labels: Filthy Bonnet; Columbia; Instinct
- Members: Melora Creager; Thistle Jemison; Ryder Cooley
- Past members: Luis Mojica; Polly Panic; Chris Vrenna; Carpella Parvo; Jonathon TeBeest; Sarah Bowman; Zoë Keating; Julia Kent; Kris Cowperthwaite; Agnieszka Rybska; Nana Bornant; Serena Jost; Lisa Haney; Perry L. James; Tom Martin; Mark Hutchins; Catie D'amica; Melissa Bell; Julie Griner; Stephanie McVey (touring); Erica Mulkey (touring); Daniel DeJesus; Dawn Miceli
- Website: rasputina.com

Rasputina is an American rock band based in New York City, known for an unconventional music style, as well as a fascination with historical allegories and fashion, especially those pertaining to the Victorian era.

The group is fronted by cellist/vocalist Melora Creager, who writes the songs and creates art for the band's albums, singles, and website.

== History ==
In 1989, Creager wrote a manifesto and placed an ad in The Village Voice seeking women to form an electric cello choir. Julia Kent, then an editor at The Village Voice, was the first respondent. The band's initial lineup contained nine musicians, but was eventually whittled to three. They named themselves "Rasputina" after one of Creager's songs. The group performed frequently and became a local favorite in New York City.

Columbia Records' A&R representative and producer Jimmy Boyle saw the group perform at a New York festival and signed them to the label in 1996. Boyle also shared production duties with Creager on Rasputina's debut album, Thanks for the Ether. In 1997 the band released Transylvanian Regurgitations, a follow-up EP remixed by Marilyn Manson and Twiggy Ramirez.

On their second full-length album, How We Quit the Forest, Rasputina signed on Chris Vrenna (from Nine Inch Nails) as their drummer and producer. He also provided electronic drums and sound effects.

Rasputina toured with such musicians as Bob Mould, Porno for Pyros, Marilyn Manson, Siouxsie Sioux, and Les Claypool. Creager played cello with Nirvana for their final tour in Europe, 1994. The band appeared as musical guests on Late Night with Conan O'Brien on two occasions, once in 1996 and again in 1998, to promote Thanks for the Ether and How We Quit the Forest, respectively.

After working with Columbia and then Instinct Records to release their first four albums and first four EPs, Rasputina released all their subsequent work either through Creager's own record label, Filthy Bonnet Recording Co. (starting with their live album A Radical Recital in 2005), or without any label affiliation whatsoever, instead selling music at their live shows or through the band's website. These off-label releases have generally been very limited runs, often with only around 100 copies being made available.

In summer 2010, Dawn Miceli made a documentary about Rasputina called Under the Corset. In January 2011 Melora Creager announced on The Dawn and Drew Show that Dawn Miceli would play the drums on the February 2011 tour.

Rasputina released Unknown on April 10, 2015. The record is a concept album focusing on Creager's trauma after an identity thief hacked into her computer. The album is only available on CD from the band's website, with Creager explaining this decision by stating, "conceptually... anyone who purchases it is known to me." The entire album was recorded solo by Creager in three weeks. The lineup assembled for the 2015 Unknown tour was the first in the history of Rasputina to add piano and beat boxing, in place of traditional drums, by Luis Mojica.

On June 26, 2015, Rasputina released a compilation of demos recorded from 1991 to 1997 titled Magnetic Strip, which was only available by digital download on the band's website.

In the fall of 2016, Polly Panic joined Rasputina as the second cellist, and the band soon toured with the lineup of Creager, Panic, and Mojica.

In July 2017, Creager announced a new album, The Feel-Good Hits of 1817. In her email newsletter, she stated that the album would be vinyl-only, and limited in quantity.

The mini-album None but the Lonely Heart was released through the band's website in 2018. The album is a collection of piano covers performed by Creager, including songs by Patti Smith, Duke Ellington, The Smiths, and Carl Sandburg. The title is taken from the Tchaikovsky song of the same name, which also serves as the first track on the album.

In 2019, the album Skin is Living Leather was released on the band's website. It features nine songs: three covers, five new songs by Creager, and one which she cowrote with her daughter, Ivy.

== Discography ==
=== Albums ===
- Thanks for the Ether – Columbia Records, 1996
- How We Quit the Forest – Columbia Records, 1998
- Cabin Fever – Instinct Records, 2002
- Frustration Plantation – Instinct Records, 2004
- Oh Perilous World – Filthy Bonnet Co., 2007
- Sister Kinderhook – Filthy Bonnet Co., June 15, 2010
- Unknown – Filthy Bonnet Co., April 10, 2015
- The Feel-Good Hits of 1817 – Filthy Bonnet Co., 2017
- None But the Lonely Heart – Filthy Bonnet Co., 2018
- Skin Is Living Leather – Filthy Bonnet Co., 2019

==== Live albums ====
- A Radical Recital – Filthy Bonnet Co., September 13, 2005
- Melora a la Basilica – Filthy Bonnet Co., December 30, 2008
- The Pregnant Concert with artwork by Dese'Rae L. Stage – Filthy Bonnet Co., May 10, 2010.

==== Compilation albums ====
- Great American Gingerbread – Filthy Bonnet Recording Co., 2011
- Magnetic Strip 1990–1998 – Filthy Bonnet Co., 2015

=== Singles and EPs ===
- Transylvanian Regurgitations – Columbia Records, 1997
- The Olde HeadBoard (CD and vinyl EP, limited release) – Columbia Records, 1998
- The Lost & Found (1st Edition) – RPM Records, 2001
- Our Lies (extremely limited release), 2001
- My Fever Broke – Instinct Records, 2002
- The Lost & Found (2nd Edition) – Instinct Records, 2003
- The Willow Tree Triptych – (extremely limited release), 2009
- Ancient Cross-Dressing Songs – (extremely limited release), 2009
- Egg Nog Edition – December 20, 2013
- Fa La La- Sketchbook.1 – January 13, 2014
- Little Queen of Spades – April 15, 2014
- Good Day, Gentlefolk – Filthy Bonnet Co., April 2, 2015
- Assiduity – Offered as MP3s on Melora's site, 2017

=== Promotional ===
- Transylvanian Concubine/The Vaulted Eel, Lesson#6 – Oculus Records, 1993
- Three (3) – (promo), 1996
- Three Lil' Nothin's – (promo), 1996
- Transylvanian Regurgitations (vinyl promo) – Columbia Records, 1997
- The Olde Headboard - Maxi Single (promotional distribution) – Columbia Records, 1997

=== Videos ===
- The Olde Headboard – Music Video, 1998
- The Olde Headboard (Weathered Mix), 1998
- My Orphanage Live at the Knitting Factory, 1999
- Under the Corset – Documentary, 2010
- Great American Gingerbread – Combination of CD rarities, including a DVD of live performances at the Knitting Factory, 2011

=== Compilation appearances ===
- "Transylvanian Concubine" on The Black Bible, a four-disc compilation album released by Cleopatra Records, 1998
- "Transylvanian Concubine" on the Buffy the Vampire Slayer: The Album soundtrack, 1999 (the song was featured in the season 2 episode "Surprise")
- "Hunter's Kiss" on the compilation album 12 Tales, 2002
- "Coraline" on the Neil Gaiman tribute album Where's Neil When You Need Him?, 2006
- "A Skeleton Bang" on the charity album Colours Are Brighter, 2006
- "Warbots" on the compilation album Asleep By Dawn Club Mix #2, 2006
- "Sweethaven" on the Harry Nilsson cover album This Is the Town: A Tribute to Nilsson (Volume 1), 2013
- "A Bit Longer Than Usual (Rasputina Mix)" on the Tweaker remix album And Then There's Nothing, 2013

== Song inspirations ==
Creager often bases the lyrics for the band on historical events or people.

These include:

- Thanks for the Ether
  - "My Little Shirtwaist Fire" is based on the Triangle Shirtwaist Factory fire of 1911.
  - "The Donner Party" discusses the Donner Party, a group of American pioneers traveling to California who encountered a series of mishaps and resorted to cannibalism. The track compares them to the colonial pilgrims.
  - "Howard Hughes" is about the eccentric billionaire aviator.
- How We Quit the Forest
  - "Rose K." is about the matriarch of the Kennedy family, who had a stroke at age 94 and was cared for at the Kennedy Compound by private nurses and staff. Although Melora jokingly refers to this as her "Alzheimer's Song" on A Radical Recital, Rose was not known to have suffered from Alzheimer's disease. In concert, Melora also frequently introduces the song by referring to Rose's husband's decision to have her daughter Rosemary Kennedy lobotomized at the age of 23, to calm her alleged mood swings.
  - "Herb Girls of Birkenau" describes the victims of human experiments in the Nazi concentration camp Auschwitz-Birkenau, from the point of view of a powerless witness.
  - "Diamond Mind" is a satire inspired by the music of a De Beers diamond commercial that uses music composed by Karl Jenkins, which he later used as a theme of the orchestral piece Palladio.
- Cabin Fever
  - "Rats" is about the 16th-century decision by the then Pope to declare the semi-aquatic capybara as fish for Catholics to eat during Lent.
- Poor Relations in the Shed Out Back (Frustration Plantation bonus disc)
  - "Yellow Fever" is about an outbreak of yellow fever in New Orleans in the summer of 1853.
- Oh Perilous World
  - "1816, The Year Without a Summer" is about the Little Ice Age. The year 1816 had an unusual weather pattern (due to the volcano Mount Tambora erupting) and was known as the Year Without a Summer. The song also makes mention of author Mary Shelley writing her famous novel Frankenstein, Freemasons and Benjamin Franklin.
  - "Choose Me For Champion" is based on a speech by Thursday October Christian I, and according to Creager also partially a translation of a speech made by Osama bin Laden.
  - "Cage in a Cave" is about Thursday Christian's father, Fletcher Christian, an 18th-century man who was the leader of the mutineers from the Mutiny on the Bounty in Tahiti.
  - "Incident in a Medical Clinic" is about the disease Schistosomiasis (also known as Snail-fever).
  - "Child Soldier Rebellion" makes mention of the Lord's Resistance Army in Uganda's usage of children as soldiers.
  - "Oh Bring Back the Egg Unbroken" is about the Tangata manu competition of the inhabitants from Easter Island.
  - "In Old Yellowcake" utilizes imagery of the destruction of Fallujah.
- Sister Kinderhook
  - "Sweet Sister Temperance" is about Emily Dickinson.
  - "A Holocaust of Giants" is about the Mound Builder giants of Illinois and Ohio.
  - "The 2 Miss Leavens" refers to the painting "Harriet Leavens" by Ammi Phillips, as well as the 2008 death of Kylie Leavens.
  - "Calico Indians" is about the Anti-Rent Wars of 1844, specifically inspired by the writings of Clara Barrus.

== Outside work ==
In 2006, Melora released a solo album, Perplexions, through Filthy Bonnet Recording Co. with then Rasputina bandmate Jonathon Tebeest on piano.

Luis Mojica, former pianist and beat-boxer in the band, released a studio album, Wholesome, with Melora Creager of Rasputina on cello and Brian Viglione of The Dresden Dolls on drums.
