= Sex Blood Rock n' Roll =

Compilation album by Vamps
- Released: September 24, 2013
- Genre: Hard rock; alternative rock
- Length: 50:11
- Language: Japanese, English
- Label: Delicious Deli Records
- Producer: Vamps

Vamps chronology
Beast (2010)	Sex Blood Rock n' Roll (2013)	Bloodsuckers (2014)

Sex Blood Rock n' Roll is the "best of Vamps" album, released on September 25, 2013. It is also the first Vamp's album to be released overseas. In addition to the album including already released songs, it also includes new recordings of the same songs, as well as re-recording of all English songs, and a remix. The album reached number 2 on the Oricon chart.

== Track listing ==
All lyrics are written by Hyde, except where noted

No.	Title	Lyrics	Music	Length
1.	"Devil Side"		Hyde	4:23
2.	"Redrum"		K.A.Z	3:50
3.	"Revolution II"		Hyde	4:33
4.	"The Past"		K.A.Z	5:02
5.	"Love Addict"		Hyde	3:59
6.	"Angel Trip"		K.A.Z	4:23
7.	"Memories"		K.A.Z	4:40
8.	"Sweet Dreams"		K.A.Z	5:42
9.	"Life On Mars?"	David Bowie	David Bowie	3:59
10.	"Vampire Depression"		K.A.Z	4:41
11.	"My First Last"		Hyde	5:05
12.	"Hunting II"		K.A.Z	1:57
13.	"SEX BLOOD ROCK N’ ROLL"		Hyde	2:52
14.	"Sex Blood Rock n' Roll (Remix)"		Hyde	4:04
