= Apocalyptica discography =

- Studio albums: 10
- Soundtrack albums: 1
- Live albums: 2
- Compilation albums: 2
- Tribute albums: 1
- Singles: 12
- Music videos: 19
- Videos and DVDs: 3

The following is a comprehensive discography of Apocalyptica, a Finnish cello metal group. As a band, they have released ten studio albums, that have charted in their native Finland, Austria, France, and in the United States. In addition to their ten studio albums, also released are two compilation albums, one soundtrack, one live album and three DVD albums.

Apocalyptica have released 13 singles to date, including two number ones. The first single, "Bittersweet", reached No. 1 in Finland in 2004. Their single "I Don't Care" featuring Adam Gontier on lead vocals, reached No. 1 in 2008 on the US Hot Mainstream Rock Tracks chart.

== Albums ==
=== Studio albums ===
Title	Album details	Peak chart positions										Sales	Certifications
Title	Album details	FIN	AUT	CHE	FRA	GER	MEX	NLD	POL	US	UK	Sales	Certifications
Plays Metallica by Four Cellos	Released: 3 October 1996; Label: Mercury/PolyGram	7	—	—	—	—	—	—	—	—	—	FIN: 23,303+	FIN: Platinum; POL: Gold; GER: Gold
Inquisition Symphony	Released: 22 September 1998; Label: Mercury/PolyGram	10	—	—	—	69	—	—	—	—	—		
Cult	Released: 28 April 2000; Label: Mercury/Universal	15	58	80	—	24	—	—	31	—	—		GER: Gold
Reflections	Released: 2 October 2003; Label: Island/Universal	8	26	42	131	15	—	—	28	—	—		GER: Gold
Apocalyptica	Released: 24 January 2005; Label: Vertigo/Universal	2	6	6	61	5	—	76	39	—	—	FIN: 15,075+	FIN: Gold
Worlds Collide	Released: 14 September 2007; Label: Sony BMG	8	13	10	45	10	5	90	—	59	111	US: 233,000+	RUS: Gold; RIAA: Gold
7th Symphony	Released: 24 August 2010; Label: Sony Music	2	6	5	34	6	15	—	5	31	—	US: 32,128; POL: 10,000+	POL: Gold
Shadowmaker	Released: 20 April 2015; Label: Eleven Seven Music	7	31	15	76	13	—	—	—	190	—		
Cell-0	Released: 10 January 2020; Label: Silver Lining	13	—	11	192	24	—	—	37	—	—		
Plays Metallica, Vol. 2	Released: 7 June 2024; Label: Throwdown Entertainment	25	32	20	—	19	—	—	—	—	—		
"—" denotes the album failed to chart, or not released.

=== Live albums ===
Title	Album details	Peak chart positions				
Title	Album details	FIN	AUT	CHE	GER	BEL
Wagner Reloaded-Live in Leipzig	Released: 15 November 2013; Label: BMG	40	70	88	36	180
Live In Helsinki St. John's Church	Released: 17 November 2023; Label: Harmageddon	—	—	—	—	—

=== Compilation albums ===
Title	Album details	Peak chart positions				
Title	Album details	FIN	AUT	CHE	FRA	GER
The Best of Apocalyptica	Released: 21 September 2002; Label: Universal	—	—	—	—	—
Amplified // A Decade of Reinventing the Cello	Released: 30 May 2006; Label: 20-20	16	19	23	158	24
"—" denotes the album failed to chart, or not released.

=== Extended plays ===
Title	Album details
Metal Classic, Classic Metal	Released: 9 September 2022; Label: Harmageddon

== Singles ==
Year	Single	Chart positions											Certifications	Album
Year	Single	FIN	AUT	CHE	GER	US	US Main.	US Alt.	US Rock	CAN	UK	UK Rock	Certifications	Album
1996	"O Holy Night/Little Drummer Boy"	11	—	—	—	—	—	—	×	—	—	—		Non-album single
1998	"Nothing Else Matters" ^{[A]}	—	—	—	—	—	—	—	×	—	—	—		Inquisition Symphony
1998	"Harmageddon"	—	—	—	—	—	—	—	×	—	—	—		Inquisition Symphony
2001	"Path Vol.2" (featuring Sandra Nasić)	4	58	100	41	—	—	—	×	—	—	—		Cult
2002	"Hope Vol.2" (featuring Matthias Sayer)	—	—	—	74	—	—	—	×	—	—	—		Cult
2003	"Faraway Vol.2" (featuring Linda Sundblad)	—	—	—	43	—	—	—	×	—	—	—		Reflections
2003	"Seemann" (featuring Nina Hagen)	18	35	73	13	—	—	—	×	—	—	—		Reflections
2004	"Bittersweet" (featuring Ville Valo and Lauri Ylönen)	1	11	8	6	—	—	—	×	—	—	—		Apocalyptica
2005	"Wie Weit/How Far/En Vie" (featuring Marta Jandová and Manu)	—	43	60	23	—	—	—	×	—	—	—		Apocalyptica
2005	"Life Burns!" (featuring Lauri Ylönen)	17	61	80	31	—	—	—	×	—	—	—		Apocalyptica
2006	"Repressed" (featuring Matt Tuck and Max Cavalera)	19	—	—	74	—	—	—	×	—	—	—		Amplified // A Decade of Reinventing the Cello
2007	"I'm Not Jesus" (featuring Corey Taylor)	15	—	—	55	—	6	15	×	—	149	2		Worlds Collide
2008	"S.O.S. (Anything but Love)" (featuring Cristina Scabbia)	—	—	—	—	—	—	—	×	—	—	—		Worlds Collide
2008	"I Don't Care" (featuring Adam Gontier)	13	—	—	—	78	1	2	14	59	—	—	MC: Gold; RIAA: 2× Platinum	Worlds Collide
2010	"End of Me" (featuring Gavin Rossdale)	—	—	—	81	—	5	20	16	—	—	—		7th Symphony
2010	"Broken Pieces" (featuring Lacey Mosley)	—	—	—	—	—	—	—	—	—	—	—		7th Symphony
2010	"Not Strong Enough" (featuring Brent Smith)^{[B]}	16	—	—	—	—	—	—	36	—	—	—	RIAA: Gold	7th Symphony
2011	"Not Strong Enough" (featuring Doug Robb, US version)^{[B]}	—	—	—	—	—	21	—	—	—	—	—		Non-album single
2015	"Cold Blood"	—	—	—	—	—	24	—	—	—	—	—		Shadowmaker
2015	"Sin in Justice" (with Vamps)	—	—	—	—	—	—	—	—	—	—	—		iTunes exclusive
2019	"Me melkein kuoltiin" (featuring Sanni and Tippa)	15	—	—	—	—	—	—	—	—	—	—		Non-album single
2021	"White Room" (featuring Jacoby Shaddix)	—	—	—	—	—	—	—	—	—	—	—		Non-album single
2024	"The Four Horsemen" (featuring Rob Trujillo)	—	—	—	—	—	—	—	—	—	—	—		Plays Metallica Vol. 2
2024	" The Unforgiven II"	—	—	—	—	—	—	—	—	—	—	—		Plays Metallica Vol. 2
2026	"Upperhand" (featuring Kalandra)	—	—	—	—	—	—	—	—	—	—	—		Non-album single, written for Control Resonant
"—" denotes the single failed to chart, or not released. "×" denotes periods where charts did not exist or were not archived.

Notes

- A "Nothing Else Matters" was a promotional-only release.
- B "Not Strong Enough" single was first released with Brent Smith of Shinedown on vocals in Europe in November 2010. The second version of the single, re-recorded with a different singer, Doug Robb, due to Shinedown's label Atlantic not allowing Smith's vocals to be used on the US radio, was released in the US market in 2011.

== Video albums ==
Title	Album details	Peak chart positions	
Title	Album details	FIN	HUN
Live	Released: 30 July 2001; Label: Island Records	—	—
Reflections Revised	Released: 2003; Label: Universal Music	—	—
The Life Burns Tour	Released: 26 May 2006; Label: Sony Music Entertainment	5	8
"—" denotes the album failed to chart, or not released.

== Music videos ==
Year	Title	Director(s)
1996	"Enter Sandman"	Kare Hellen
1996	"The Unforgiven"	Kare Hellen
1998	"Nothing Else Matters"	Pasi Pauni
1998	"Harmageddon"	Kare Hellen
2000	"Path"	Carsten Gutschmidt, Mira Tiel
2001	"Path Vol.2" (featuring Sandra Nasić)	Kai Sehr
2001	"Hope Vol.2" (featuring Matthias Sayer)	Christoph Mangler, Mathias Vielsaecker
2003	"Somewhere Around Nothing"	Omar Abulzahab
2003	"Faraway Vol.2" (featuring Linda Sundblad)	Olaf Heine
2003	"Seemann" (featuring Nina Hagen)	Taku Kaskela
2004	"Bittersweet" (featuring Ville Valo and Lauri Ylönen)	Antti Jokinen
2004	"Wie Weit/How Far/En Vie" (featuring Marta Jandová)	Uwe Flade
2004	"Life Burns" (featuring Lauri Ylönen)	Volker Hannwacker
2006	"Repressed" (featuring Matt Tuck and Max Cavalera)	Ralf Strathann
2007	"I'm Not Jesus" (featuring Corey Taylor)	Tony Petrossian
2007	"S.O.S. (Anything but Love)" (featuring Cristina Scabbia)	Marko Mäkilaakso
2008	"I Don't Care" (featuring Adam Gontier)	Lisa Mann
2008	"Grace"	Igor Burloff
2010	"End of Me" (featuring Gavin Rossdale)	Lisa Mann
2010	"Broken Pieces" (featuring Lacey Mosley)	Lisa Mann
2010	"Not Strong Enough" (featuring Brent Smith / Doug Robb)	Lisa Mann
2015	"Cold Blood "	Lisa Mann
2016	"Battery"	Ville Juurikkala
2019	"Ashes of the Modern World"	Ville Juurikkala
2019	"Rise"	Lisa Mann
2019	"En Route To Mayhem"	Lisa Mann
2020	"Live Or Die" (featuring Joakim Brodén)	Ville Juurikkala
2021	"White Room" (featuring Jacoby Shaddix)	Taku Kaskela
2022	"I'll Get Through It" (featuring Geezer Butler)	William Felch
2022	"Bolero"	Jani Vuorialho
2022	"Rise Again" (with Simone Simons)	Lisa Mann
2023	"What We're Up Against" (featuring Elize Ryd)	Patric Ullaeus
2024	"The Four Horsemen" (featuring Rob Trujillo)	Patric Ullaeus
2024	"The Unforgiven II"	Patric Ullaeus
2024	"One" (featuring James Hetfield & Rob Trujillo)	Patric Ullaeus
2026	"Upperhand" (featuring Kalandra)	Jens de Vos

== Guest appearances ==
Year	Song	Artist	Album
1997	"Purify Yourself"	Waltari	Space Avenue
1997	"Look Out Tonite"	Waltari	Space Avenue
1997	"Meine Liebe ist ein Monster"	Schweisser	Heiland
1999	"Take Your Time"	Guitar Slingers	The Story So Far
2000	"Letting the Cables Sleep - Remix"	Bush	Letting the Cables Sleep, Pt. 2
2000	"Bataillon D'amour"	Joachim Witt	Bayreuth 2
2001	"In Joy and Sorrow"	HIM	Deep Shadows and Brilliant Highlights
2001	"Riverside"	Rea Garvey	Can't Stand the Silence
2001	"Perdeler Apocalyptica Version"	Şebnem Ferah	Perdeler
2001	"Valtio"	Sepultura	Nation
2004	"Turn the Sky"	Angelzoom	Angelzoom
2004	"Built to Resist"	Grip Inc.	Incorporated
2005	"Intro"	Bullet for My Valentine	The Poison
2005	"Benzin [Kerosiini Remix]"	Rammstein	Benzin
2005	"Бой с тенью"	Shadowboxing	Movie Soundtrack
2005	"Dead Promises"	The Rasmus	Hide from the Sun
2008	"Live for the Kill"	Amon Amarth	Twilight of the Thunder God
2006	"Die Schlinge"	Oomph!	GlaubeLiebeTod
2007	"Ghost"	The 69 Eyes	Angels
2009	"Иуда" ("Iuda")	Пилигрим (Pilgrim)	Vybora niet
2012	"Edge of a Dream"	Firewind	Few Against Many
2012	"The Beauty of Cortana"	Neil Davidge	Halo 4 Original Soundtrack
2015	"Sin in Justice"	Vamps	Digital Single
2015	"Peace Revisited"	Darude	Moments
2017	"Kelpaat kelle vaan"	Sanni	Vain elämää - kausi 7, toinen kattaus
2020	"Angels Calling"	Sabaton	Attero Dominatus
2022	"Someone To Talk To"	Three Days Grace	Explosions
2026	"Tango"	Tarja	Frisson Noir
