= Amplified // A Decade of Reinventing the Cello =

Compilation album by Apocalyptica
- Released: 30 May 2006
- Recorded: 1996–2006
- Genre: Cello metal, classical, chamber music
- Length: 104:46
- Label: 20-20 Entertainment

Apocalyptica chronology
| Apocalyptica (2006) | Amplified // A Decade of Reinventing the Cello (2006) | The Life Burns Tour (2006) |

Singles from Amplified // A Decade of Reinventing the Cello
- 1. "Repressed" Released: 19 May 2006

Professional ratings
Review scores
| Source | Rating |
|---|---|
| AllMusic | 4.5/5 stars |
| Brave Words & Bloody Knuckles | 9/10 |
| RockReviews | 7/10 stars |

Amplified // A Decade of Reinventing the Cello is the second greatest hits, double album by Finnish band Apocalyptica.

== Track listing ==
CD 1: Instrumentals
| No. | Title | Album | Length |
|---|---|---|---|
| 1. | "Enter Sandman" (Metallica cover from Untitled Metallica album) | Plays Metallica by Four Cellos | 3:41 |
| 2. | "Harmageddon" | Inquisition Symphony | 4:56 |
| 3. | "Nothing Else Matters" (Metallica cover from Untitled Metallica album) | Inquisition Symphony | 4:48 |
| 4. | "Refuse/Resist" (Sepultura cover Chaos A.D.) | Inquisition Symphony | 3:13 |
| 5. | "Somewhere Around Nothing" | Reflections | 4:10 |
| 6. | "Betrayal/Forgiveness" | Untitled Apocalyptica album | 5:13 |
| 7. | "Farewell" | Untitled Apocalyptica album | 5:32 |
| 8. | "Master of Puppets (song)" (Metallica cover from Master of Puppets (album)) | Plays Metallica by Four Cellos | 6:03 |
| 9. | "Hall of the Mountain King" (Edvard Grieg cover, from Peer Gynt, Op. 23, Act II, Pt. 5) | Cult | 3:29 |
| 10. | "One" (Metallica cover) | Inquisition Symphony | 5:45 |
| 11. | "Heat" | Reflections | 3:22 |
| 12. | "Čohkka" | Reflections | 4:29 |
| 13. | "Kaamos" | Cult | 4:44 |
| 14. | "Deathzone" | Untitled Apocalyptica album | 4:36 |
| 15. | "Angel of Death" (Slayer cover from Reign in Blood) | Amplified // A Decade of Reinventing the Cello | 2:56 |
| Total length: | | | 67:53 |

CD 2: Vocals
| No. | Title | Album | Length |
|---|---|---|---|
| 1. | "Repressed" | Amplified // A Decade of Reinventing the Cello | 4:27 |
| 2. | "Path Vol. 2" | Cult | 3:24 |
| 3. | "Bittersweet" | Untitled Apocalyptica album | 4:26 |
| 4. | "Hope Vol. 2" | Cult | 4:03 |
| 5. | "En Vie" | Untitled Apocalyptica album | 3:28 |
| 6. | "Faraway Vol. 2" | Reflections | 5:12 |
| 7. | "Life Burns!" | Untitled Apocalyptica album | 3:08 |
| 8. | "Seemann" (Rammstein cover) | Reflections | 5:20 |
| Total length: | | | 33:28 |

Limited edition
| No. | Title | Album | Length |
|---|---|---|---|
| 1. | "Heat" (Live video) | Reflections | 3:22 |
| 2. | "Wie weit" | Untitled Apocalyptica album | 3:27 |
| Total length: | | | 6:49 |

== Credits ==
=== Apocalyptica ===
- Eicca Toppinen – cello; music (CD 1 (2, 5 & 11–13) & CD 2 (1–7) & Limited Edition), double bass, percussion, and arrangements
- Perttu Kivilaakso – cello; music (CD 1 (6, 7 & 14)), programming
- Paavo Lötjönen – cello
- Mikko Sirén – drums (CD 1 (7 & 14) & CD 2 (1, 3, 5 & 7) Limited Edition); programming

=== Additional personnel ===
==== Other ====
- Kai "Hiili" Hiilesmaa – percussion on "Cult"
- Mika Jussila – mastering
- Niina Pasanen – music styling

==== Engineering and recording ====
- Jyrki Tuovinen – engineering (10), recording
- T-T Oksala – mixed, programming, recording

==== Drummers ====
- Dave Lombardo – CD 1 (5 & 6)
- Sami Kuoppamäki – CD 1 (11 & 12) & "Faraway"

==== Ex-Apocalyptica members on Plays Metallica by Four Cellos and Inquisition Symphony ====
- Antero Manninen
- Max Lilja – also on "Cult"

==== Double bassists ====
- Mikko Moilanen – CD 1 (6 & 14)
- Ville Väätäinen – CD 2 (12)

==== Violinists on Reflections ====
- Jyrki Lasonpalo
- Kerim Gribajcevic
- Lotta Nykäsenoja

==== "Seemann" ====
- Nina Hagen – vocals
- Michael Wolff – vocal painting
- Mikko Raita – mixing and recording
- Oliver Riedel – songwriting
- Teijo Jämsä – drums

==== Vocalists and others ====
Bittersweet

- Lauri Ylönen – lyrics, vocals also on "Life Burns!"
- Ville Valo – lyrics

Quutamo

- Manu – on "En Vie"
- Marta Jandová – on "How Far" & "Wie Weit"

Repressed

- Max Cavalera – lyrics, also songwriting on "Refuse/Resist"
- Matt Tuck – lyrics

Path Vol. 2

- Sandra Nasić – lyrics
- Clemens Matzenik – engineering at Horus

Hope Vol.2

- Matthias Sayer – lyrics
- Jeff Collier – lyrics

Faraway

- Linda Sundblad – vocals
- Juhani Lagerspetz – piano

==== Metallica songwriting credits ====
Metallica

- James Hetfield
- Kirk Hammett – Only on CD 1 (1 & 3)
- Cliff Burton – Only on "Master of Puppets"
- Lars Ulrich

==== Other writers ====
- Edvard Grieg – "Hall of the Mountain King"
- Jeff Hanneman – "Angel of Death"
