= Bloodsuckers (Vamps album) =

Studio album by Vamps
- Released: October 29, 2014 (Japan); March 23, 2015 (Europe); March 24, 2015 (US)
- Recorded: 2013–2014
- Genres: Hard rock; alternative rock
- Length: 50:05
- Languages: Japanese, English
- Labels: Delicious Deli, Spinefarm
- Producers: Vamps, Josh Wilbur

Vamps chronology
Beast (2010)	Bloodsuckers (2014)	Underworld (2017)

Singles from Bloodsuckers
- 1. "Ahead/Replay" Released: July 3, 2013; 2. "Get Away/The Jolly Roger" Released: August 20, 2014; 3. "Vampire's Love" Released: October 8, 2014

Bloodsuckers is the third studio album by Japanese rock band Vamps, released on October 29, 2014. The album reached number 5 on the Oricon chart. Its release followed in Europe on March 23, 2015, and in the United States on March 24. The album's production was done by Josh Wilbur collaborating with Vamps, and Japanese artist Rockin’ Jelly Bean designed the cover artwork.

'Ahead' was titled 'World's End' for international release and was used in the Sony campaign for the Xperia UK mobile. While ‘Vampire’s Love’ was used as the theme song for the Japanese release of the 2014 feature film Dracula Untold.

Additionally, ‘The Jolly Roger’ was featured in the TV commercial for Nissan's X-Trail SUV.

== Track listing ==
All lyrics are written by Hyde.

No.	Title	Music	Length
1.	"Reincarnation"	K.A.Z	1:34
2.	"Zero"	K.A.Z	3:32
3.	"Lips"	Hyde	4:04
4.	"Ahead / World’s End"	Hyde	4:12
5.	"Evil"	K.A.Z	3:25
6.	"Ghost"	K.A.Z	4:48
7.	"Vampire's Love"	Hyde	4:50
8.	"Damned"	Hyde	4:21
9.	"Get Away"	K.A.Z	4:19
10.	"Replay"	K.A.Z	4:12
11.	"Bloodsuckers"	Hyde	1:26
12.	"The Jolly Roger"	Hyde	4:41
13.	"Inside Myself"	Hyde	5:02
Total length:			50:05
