= Ahead/Replay =

Single by Vamps

from the album Bloodsuckers
- Released: July 03, 2013
- Recorded: 2013
- Genre: Alternative rock
- Label: Delicious Deli Records
- Songwriter(s): Hyde, K.A.Z
- Producer(s): Vamps

Vamps singles chronology
"Memories" (2010)	"Ahead/Replay" (2013)	"Get Away/The Jolly Roger" (2014)

"Ahead/Replay" is the eighth double A-side single by Vamps, and the first single from album Bloodsuckers released on July 3, 2013. The single came with a DVD that includes the music videos for "Ahead" and "Replay". The single reached number 3 on the Oricon chart.

== Track listing ==
No.	Title	Lyrics	Music	Length
1.	"Ahead"	Hyde	Hyde	4:11
2.	"Replay"	Hyde	K.A.Z	4:12
3.	"Ahead (Instrumental)"		Hyde	4:11
4.	"Replay (Instrumental)"		K.A.Z	4:12
