= Underworld (Vamps album) =

Studio album by Vamps
- Released: April 26, 2017 (Japan); April 28, 2017 (International)
- Recorded: 2015–2017
- Genre: Hard rock
- Language: English, Japanese
- Label: Virgin Music
- Producer: Howard Benson, Kane Churko, Vamps

Vamps chronology
Bloodsuckers (2014)	Underworld (2017)

Singles from Underworld
- 1. "Sin in Justice" Released: November 20, 2015; 2. "Inside of Me" Released: August 31, 2016; 3. "Calling" Released: March 22, 2017

Underworld is the fourth and final studio album by Japanese rock band Vamps, released on April 26, 2017 in Japan and April 28 internationally. The production took place in Henderson, Nevada with producer Kane Churko.

== Overview ==
Designed to appeal to American audiences, Underworld marks the first time Vamps brought in a producer and co-writers on songs. The concept bringing the album to life was the "'Underworld' is not a place that we can see with our eyes, 'the physical world,' but the dark side that's hidden beneath the surface, 'the shadow world' where VAMPS' true nature lies." "Vamps has always been trying to portray a world that exists between something that 'could be of this world, but isn't' and that 'might not exist, but does.'"

The track list consists of 11 songs including "Rise or Die" recorded as a coupling song to "Inside of Me" featuring Chris Motionless from Motionless in White."Sin in Justice", done in collaboration with Apocalyptica also included

== Track listing ==
No.	Title	Lyrics	Music	Length
1.	"Underworld"	Kane Churko, Hyde	Hyde	3:23
2.	"Calling"	Kane Churko, Hyde	K.A.Z	2:56
3.	"Break Free" (featuring Kamikaze Boy of Man with a Mission)	Kane Churko, Hyde	K.A.Z	3:36
4.	"Don't Hold Back"	Kane Churko, Hyde	Hyde	3:24
5.	"Bleed for Me"	Kane Churko, Hyde	K.A.Z	4:24
6.	"In This Hell"	Kane Churko, Hyde	Hyde	4:00
7.	"Inside of Me" (feat. Chris Motionless of Motionless in White)	Hyde, Howard Benson, Lenny Skolnik, Seann Bowe	Hyde	3:28
8.	"Rise or Die" (feat. Richard Z. Kruspe of Emigrate/Rammstein)	Richard Z. Kruspe, Hyde, Howard Benson, Lenny Skolnik, Seann Bowe	Richard Z. Kruspe, Hyde, Howard Benson, Lenny Skolnik, Seann Bowe	3:22
9.	"Sin in Justice" (featuring Apocalyptica)	Hyde	K.A.Z	4:54
10.	"B.Y.O.B (Bring Your Own Blood)"	Kane Churko, Hyde	K.A.Z	3:20
11.	"Rise Up"	Kane Churko, Hyde	Hyde	3:15
