= Vampire's Love =

Single by Vamps

from the album Bloodsuckers
- Released: October 8, 2014
- Genre: Rock
- Label: Delicious Deli Records
- Songwriter: Hyde
- Producer: Vamps

Vamps singles chronology
"Get Away/The Jolly Roger" (2014)	"Vampire's Love" (2014)	"Sin in Justice" (2015)

"Vampire's Love" is the tenth single by Japanese rock band Vamps, released on October 8, 2014 as the third single from their album Bloodsuckers. The single reached number 3 on the Oricon chart. "Vampire's Love" was used for the Japanese release of the American action horror film Dracula Untold.

== Recording and release ==
Vamps were already working on "Vampire's Love" when they received the offer to provide music for the Japanese release of the American action horror film Dracula Untold. According to Rockin'On Japan, the distributor of the vampire-themed film was eager to have Vamps, whose name was derived from Hyde's love of vampires, provide a song. The song is about the sad fate that only vampires experience.

The single was released in 3 different versions: Limited Edition A (CD+DVD), Limited Edition B (CD+Story Book), and Regular Edition. Limited Edition A come with a DVD containing the PV produced by Ken Nikai and its making video, while Limited Edition B enclose a story book that is linked closely to the PV. While the domestic version of Bloodsuckers includes the Japanese version of the song, the international edition of the album released in 2015 includes the English version.

== Music video ==
Music video for "Vampire's Love" was directed by Ken Nikai and was filmed at London in March 2014.

In the music video, Hyde and K.A.Z act as the vampires. Hyde is the main character, a vampire that falls in love with a girl who resemble his past girlfriend who died long time ago. Meanwhile, K.A.Z is Hyde's friend who is also a vampire. The three support members of Vamps, Ju-ken, Arimatsu and Jin, also appear in the music video. Ju-ken plays a role as a victim of Hyde's bloodsucking. Meanwhile, both Arimatsu and Jin play the role of citizens that appear when Hyde's girl nearly gets hit by a car.

== Tracklist ==
All tracks are written by Hyde.

CD (Regular Edition)
No.	Title	Arrangements	Length
1.	"Vampire's Love"	Vamps	4:49
2.	"Vampire's Love -Piano Version-"	Vamps	4:54
3.	"Vampire's Love -Kevin Breton Remix"	Kevin Breton	5:14

CD (Limited Edition A)
No.	Title	Arrangements	Length
1.	"Vampire's Love"	Vamps	4:49
2.	"Vampire's Love -Piano Version-"	Vamps	4:54
3.	"Vampire's Love -Kevin Breton Remix"	Kevin Breton	5:14

CD (Limited Edition B)
No.	Title	Arrangements	Length
1.	"Vampire's Love"	Vamps	4:49
2.	"Vampire's Love -Piano Version-"	Vamps	4:54
3.	"Vampire's Love -Instrumental-"	Vamps	4:49

=== DVD (Limited Edition A) ===
1. Vampire's Love -Music Video-
2. Vampire's Love -Making-
