= Calling (Vamps song) =

Single by Vamps

from the album Underworld
- Released: March 22, 2017
- Genre: Rock
- Label: Spinefarm Records
- Songwriter(s): Kane Churko, HYDE, K.A.Z
- Producer(s): Vamps, Kane Churko

Vamps singles chronology
"Inside Of Me" (2016)	"Calling" (2017)

Calling is the thirteenth single by Vamps released on March 22, 2017. This is the third and final single from the album Underworld.

The single was produced by Kane Churko who is notable for his great work with a long list of artists including Ozzy Osbourne, Five Finger Death Punch and Papa Roach. The single is a heavy rock track.

Aside from “Calling” the single include a cover song, Enjoy The Silence originally by Depeche Mode as the B-side. The limited edition will also come with some live recorded tracks.

The single reached number 8 on the Oricon chart.

== Track listing ==
No.	Title	Lyrics	Music	Length
1.	"Calling"	Kane Churko HYDE	K.A.Z	2:56
2.	"Enjoy The Silence"	Martin L. Gore	Martin L. Gore	3:35
3.	"The Past (Live)"	HYDE	K.A.Z	5:02
4.	"Replay (Live)"	HYDE	K.A.Z	4:42
5.	"Sweet Dreams (Live)"	HYDE	K.A.Z	7:22
