= Shampoo (duo) =

English pop duo

- Origin: Plumstead, London, England
- Genres: Bubblegum-punk; power pop
- Years active: 1993–2000
- Labels: Icerink; Food; Parlophone; EMI
- Past members: Jacqui Blake; Carrie Askew

Shampoo were a 1990s English pop-punk duo consisting of Jacqueline "Jacqui" Blake and Caroline "Carrie" Askew. Their 1994 song "Trouble", from their debut album, We Are Shampoo, reached No. 11 in the UK Singles Chart and was featured in 1995's Mighty Morphin Power Rangers: The Movie.

== History ==
Jacqui Blake and Carrie Askew were best friends at Plumstead Manor School, a secondary school for girls in Plumstead, London. In the early nineties they started writing Last Exit, a fanzine for the Manic Street Preachers, and later appeared in the video for "Little Baby Nothing". They also wrote a fanzine for Fabulous.

During this time they formed Shampoo, taking the name from their schoolyard nickname of 'the shampoo girls', for claiming to be 'washing their hair' when turning down date requests.

Their first single, "Blisters and Bruises" (co-written by Lawrence of the bands Felt and Denim) with the B-sides "Paydirt" and "I Love Little Pussy", was released by Icerink Records (a short-lived label created by Saint Etienne's Bob Stanley and Pete Wiggs) on 7-inch pink vinyl in 1993. This and their following single, "Bouffant Headbutt", received favourable reviews in the music press, such as the NME and Melody Maker, but sold few copies.

Whilst their first two singles were typical of the riot grrrl bands coming to notice, the following year saw the release of "Trouble" and the album We Are Shampoo, which displayed a more radio-friendly sound, but still with much of their previous abrasiveness: "Dirty Old Love Song" panned Mariah Carey and Whitney Houston (whose "I Will Always Love You" had been the previous year's biggest-selling single in the UK). "Shiny Black Taxi Cab" was about a night on the town gone wrong (ending with a spoken section by the 'taxi driver' complaining to a new passenger about two drunken girls who had thrown up all over his cab the previous week). We Are Shampoo sold over a million copies, with the majority of sales in Japan and the rest of Asia.

"Trouble" reached No. 11 on the UK charts, landing the group on Top of the Pops and the cover of Smash Hits magazine. For the remainder of 1994, Shampoo did well, finding fans in both the mainstream and alternative music scenes, boosted in part by their links to the Manic Street Preachers fanscene. Shampoo became moderately successful in Japan. "Trouble" was included in the 1995 film Mighty Morphin Power Rangers: The Movie and also appeared on the film's soundtrack. It also appeared in the 1996 film Foxfire and the 1997 film Trojan War. The Britpop single "Delicious" reached No. 21 in the UK in February 1995. It is also played in the 1997 film Casper: A Spirited Beginning. The song "Don't Call Me Babe" was included in the soundtrack of the 1996 film Barb Wire.

In July 1996, a week before the Spice Girls debuted on the UK Singles Chart with "Wannabe", the duo charted with a song called "Girl Power" (a slogan which was popularised by the Spice Girls). However, this song peaked at No. 25, and was only on the chart for four weeks, meaning that by the time Shampoo released their second album, also called Girl Power, their sales were in decline. In September 1996, they released a cover of the Waitresses' "I Know What Boys Like", which became their last chart entry, peaking at No. 42. After the Girl Power album failed to reach the UK Albums Chart, the duo separated from Food Records, and the third Shampoo album, Absolute Shampoo, was released solely on the Internet in 2000.

Shampoo often cited their main influences as being the Sex Pistols, Gary Numan and the Beastie Boys, whilst also claiming to be huge fans of East 17 and Take That. Shampoo covered Numan's song "Cars" on the B-side of their "Girl Power" single, while a cover of East 17's "House of Love" was included on their debut album.

In May 2007, the album We Are Shampoo was re-issued in the UK with their B-sides as bonus tracks.

In September 2019, Q magazine published an interview with Shampoo. Regarding the end of the group, Carrie said, "We never said, 'let's split up', we just took some time off. And then that ended up being a bit more time and a bit more and it just fizzed out really. We wanted to settle down and have kids. It just came to a natural end." The band's complete discography was re-released as a box set in 2024.

== Discography ==
Shampoo discography
- Studio albums: 4
- Compilation albums: 2
- Singles: 10
- Video albums: 1
- Music videos: 2

The discography of Shampoo consists of four studio albums, two compilation albums and ten singles.

=== Studio albums ===
| Year | Album | Chart positions | | |
| Year | Album | UK | AUS | JPN |
|---|---|---|---|---|
| 1994 | We Are Shampoo: Labels: Food Records, Parlophone, Toshiba EMI-Ltd, Cherry Red; Notes: Re-issued with 6 B-sides in 2007. | 45 | 137 | 8 |
| 1995 | Shampoo or Nothing: Labels: Toshiba EMI Ltd; Notes: Japanese Release of Girl Power | – | – | 10 |
| 1996 | Girl Power: Labels: Food Records, Parlophone; Notes: UK release of Shampoo or Nothing | – | 192 | – |
| 2000 | Absolute Shampoo: Labels: Shampoo Records; Notes: Internet only | – | – | – |

=== Compilation albums ===
| Year | Album | Chart positions |
| Year | Album | JPN |
|---|---|---|
| 1995 | Delicious: Labels: Toshiba EMI Ltd; Notes: Japan only: B-sides/rare tracks | 6 |
| 1998 | The Greatest: Labels: Toshiba EMI Ltd; Notes: Japan only | – |
| 2024 | Complete Shampoo: Labels: Warner Music Group - X5 Music Group; Notes: 3 albums with unreleased songs+DVD | – |

=== Singles ===
| Year | Single | Chart positions | | | | | |
| Year | Single | UK | AUS | BEL (FLA) | IRE | JPN | NLD |
|---|---|---|---|---|---|---|---|
| 1993 | "Blisters and Bruises" | 117 | – | – | – | – | – |
| 1993 | "Bouffant Headbutt" | – | – | – | – | – | – |
| 1994 | "Trouble" | 11 | 17 | 17 | 23 | 81 | 16 |
| 1994 | "Viva La Megababes" | 27 | 97 | 50 | – | – | – |
| 1995 | "Delicious" | 21 | 223 | – | – | 76 | – |
| 1995 | "Trouble" (re-release) | 36 | – | – | – | – | – |
| 1995 | "War Paint" (Japan only) | – | – | – | – | – | – |
| 1996 | "Girl Power" | 25 | 120 | – | – | 22 | – |
| 1996 | "I Know What Boys Like" | 42 | 131 | – | – | – | – |
| 1996 | "Yea Yea Yea (Tell Me Baby)" (Japan only) | – | – | – | – | 95 | – |

- All Japanese figures are from the Oricon Singles Chart.

=== Video ===
- We Are Shampoo (1995) – Japanese video collection containing videos for "Trouble", "Viva La Megababes", "Delicious" & "Bouffant Headbutt".
- There are two different videos for "Trouble". The original features the girls trying to get home from central London after a night out. The re-make features new footage of the girls singing to the camera, intercut with film footage from Mighty Morphin Power Rangers: The Movie.

=== Books ===
- Delicious (1995, Japanese book)

== Use of audio in other media ==
- "Trouble" appears on the soundtracks to Mighty Morphin Power Rangers: The Movie (1995), Foxfire (1996) and Jawbreaker (1999). The song is sung by characters in the film Blackrock (1997). It is featured in the closing credits of the seventh episode of Zapped, and is also featured in the film Trojan War (1997).
- "Don't Call Me Babe" appears in the film Barb Wire (1996) and on its soundtrack, and also appears in Jawbreaker (1999).
- "Delicious" appears on the Casper: A Spirited Beginning (1997) soundtrack.
- Shampoo provided voices for the PlayStation puzzle game Spin Jam (2000).
- "Girl Power" and "News Flash" are featured in the film Sugar & Spice (2001).

== Covers by other acts ==
"Trouble" was covered by Carter the Unstoppable Sex Machine, and can be found as a B-side on their "The Young Offenders Mum" single. It was also sung by the cast of the 2007 film St Trinian's and featured on the film's soundtrack. In 2009, Japanese rock band Vamps included a cover of the song as a B-side to their single "I Gotta Kick Start Now". That same year, Zebrahead also included a version on their cover album, Panty Raid. In 2021, Miley Cyrus recorded a cover of the song "Delicious" for use in a Gucci commercial.
