= Love Addict =

Love Addict may refer to:

- Love addiction, a human behavior in which people become addicted to the feeling of being in love
- "Love Addict" (Mika Nakashima song), a 2003 song by Japanese singer Mika Nakashima
- "Love Addict" (Vamps song), a 2008 song by Japanese band Vamps
- Love Addict (album), a 2011 album by Chinese pop singer Prudence Liew
- Love Addict, a 2016 film comedy featuring Courtney Stodden
