= Get Away/The Jolly Roger =

Single by Vamps

from the album Bloodsuckers
- Released: August 20, 2014
- Genre: Alternative rock
- Label: Delicious Deli Records
- Songwriter(s): Hyde, K.A.Z
- Producer(s): Vamps

Vamps singles chronology
"Ahead/Replay" (2013)	"Get Away/The Jolly Roger" (2014)	"Vampire's Love" (2014)

"Get Away/The Jolly Roger" is the ninth double A-side single by Vamps, and the second single from album Bloodsuckers released on August 20, 2014. The single reached number 3 on the Oricon chart.

‘The Jolly Roger’ was featured in the TV commercial for Nissan's X-Trail SUV.

== Format ==
The single was released in 3 Type including Limited Edition A, Limited Edition B, and Regular Edition. Limited Edition A came with CD and DVD which included music video and making of "Get Away". Limited Edition B came with CD and DVD including music video and making of "The Jolly Roger". Regular Edition only came with CD.

== Music videos ==
Music videos for "Get Away"'and "The Jolly Roger" were filmed in June 2014 at Hong Kong on the same day. "The Jolly Roger" was filmed first during the noon and then "Get Away" was filmed at night.

== Tracklist ==
CD（Regular Edition）
No.	Title	Lyrics	Music	Arrangements	Length
1.	"Get Away"	HYDE	K.A.Z	VAMPS	4:22
2.	"The Jolly Roger"	HYDE	HYDE	VAMPS	4:41
3.	"Get Away–BAGUZERO Remix-"	HYDE	K.A.Z	BAGUZERO	4:36
4.	"The Jolly Roger -Gomi's I Wanna Rock Right Now Remix-"	HYDE	HYDE	DJ GOMI	5:38

CD（Limited Edition A）
No.	Title	Lyrics	Music	Arrangements	Length
1.	"Get Away"	HYDE	K.A.Z	VAMPS	4:22
2.	"The Jolly Roger"	HYDE	HYDE	VAMPS	4:41
3.	"Get Away -Clinton Sparks Remix-"	HYDE	K.A.Z	CLINTON SPARKS	4:19
4.	"Get Away -Instrumental-"		K.A.Z	VAMPS	4:23

CD（Limited Edition B）
No.	Title	Lyrics	Music	Arrangements	Length
1.	"The Jolly Roger"	HYDE	HYDE	VAMPS	4:41
2.	"Get Away"	HYDE	K.A.Z	VAMPS	4:22
3.	"The Jolly Roger –Wildstylez Remix-"	HYDE	HYDE	WILDSTYLEZ	4:38
4.	"The Jolly Roger -Instrumental-"		HYDE	VAMPS	4:40

=== DVD (Limited Edition A) ===
1. Get Away -MUSIC VIDEO-
2. Get Away -MAKING-

=== DVD (Limited Edition B) ===
1. The Jolly Roger -MUSIC VIDEO-
2. The Jolly Roger -MAKING-
