= Trouble (Shampoo song) =

1994 single by Shampoo

Single by Shampoo

from the album We Are Shampoo and Mighty Morphin Power Rangers The Movie: Original Soundtrack Album
- B-side: "We Don't Care"; "School Is Boring"
- Released: 18 July 1994
- Genre: Bubblegum pop
- Length: 3:19
- Label: Food
- Songwriters: Carolyn Askew; Jacqueline Blake; Conall Fitzpatrick
- Producer: Conall Fitzpatrick

Shampoo singles chronology
"Bouffant Headbutt" (1993)	"Trouble" (1994)	"Viva La Megababes" (1994)

"Trouble" is a song by British female pop music duo Shampoo, released in July 1994, by Food Records, as the first single from their debut album, We Are Shampoo (1994). The song was written by the duo's Carolyn "Carrie" Askew and Jacqueline "Jacqui" Blake with producer Conall Fitzpatrick, and peaked at No. 11 on the UK Singles Chart. It also reached the top-20 in Australia, Belgium, Finland, Israel and the Netherlands, as well as No. 37 in Canada.

"Trouble" received critical acclaim by music critics and was named Single of the Week by Melody Maker and NME. Attempting to break into the US market, the song was released as a promotional single for the 1995 film Mighty Morphin Power Rangers: The Movie, in anticipation of the release of the US version of We Are Shampoo. A new music video was filmed featuring clips from the Power Rangers film. NME magazine ranked "Trouble" at No. 23 on their list of the 50 best songs of 1994.

== Release ==
The US promotional campaign for Shampoo, which centred on the single "Trouble", was described by Billboard as a massive effort. In addition to releasing the song as a promotion single for the Power Rangers film, 15,000 promotional cassettes of "Trouble" were given away at Wet Seal stores, as were coupons for the full album, and a video-reel containing music videos for "Trouble" and Shampoo's other singles, "Delicious" and "Viva La Megababes" was made, with the hopes of finding in-store play at over 200 music retail outlets.

== Critical reception ==
Tom Demalon from AllMusic said that within seconds of hearing the track "most listeners will either be gleefully giggling along with the girls or scrambling for the stop button." While reviewing the Jawbreaker soundtrack, another editor, Doug Stone, spoke favourably of the track, and Jonathan Bernstein from Spin described it as Shampoo's version of 'No Sleep till Brooklyn', stating the song catapulted them to success, particularly in Japan. Larry Flick from Billboard magazine felt the song was just as goofy as the Power Rangers film it was supporting, and that it would probably only be of interest to children and top 40 radio as a novelty. Caroline Sullivan from The Guardian said, "The music is in the pouting, yelping tradition of the Slits, cushioned by the most basic of backbeats. Fetching enough, but their self-conscious emphasis on the minutiae of adolescence ('School is boring, let's go home') is tiresome." Chuck Campbell from Knoxville News Sentinel declared 'Trouble' as "a romping tale of party girls who stay out too late and can't get home". In his weekly UK chart commentary, James Masterton commented, "Whether they can be any more than a summer novelty is open to question and I will watch with interest." Taylor Parkes from Melody Maker named it Single of the Week, adding, "Glossy, lipstick-thin rap beats frame a torturous tale of woe, as Jacqui and Carrie miss the last tube home, have no money for a cab, get caught in the rain, wait in vain for the night bus, and, in desperation, attempt to steal a car, before remembering that neither of them can drive."

Pan-European magazine Music & Media wrote, "Please meet Jacqui & Carrie. Headmasters beware of these schoolgirl versions of Poly Styrene (X-Ray Spex) and ex-Transvision Vamp Wendy James provoking with punky bubble gum pop." Music & Media editor Robbert Tilli compared their style to the likes of Bananarama, Transvision Vamp and Fuzzbox. Alan Jones from Music Week said, "Taking their cue from the B-52's, circa 'Love Shack', Shampoo are not one of the most original bands around, but they are good fun. Sure to score." Sylvia Patterson from NME also named 'Trouble' Single of the Week, praising it as "fiercely catchy, unfeasibly stupid, gloriously good-looking. What more do you want?" Stuart Maconie from Select named it their third and best single, adding, "Best because it's the nearest yet to being a really sunny, goofy pop song as opposed to a knowing, slightly middle-aged punk pastiche. 'Trouble' is little else but a chorus (indeed the verse is squawked in a way that makes putting a tin opener in your own eye seem attractive by comparison) but it's a hell of a funny and memorable one. It's extremely likely that by the time you read this, even people who live in stilt houses in the Mekong Delta will be singing 'Uh-Oh, we're in trouble'." Pete Stanton from Smash Hits gave it three out of five, writing, "Shampoo have tried to be pop stars before and failed, yet they might just do it this time with the help of an annoying chorus and noisy guitars. They may want to make out they're anarchists, but they've still got to be in for 9pm."

== Music videos ==
The original music video for the song was directed by Chris D'Adda and produced by William Green. It was released on 11 July 1994 and features the girls struggling to get home from central London after a night out after missing the last bus, as their lyrics describe. The re-make music video to promote Mighty Morphin Power Rangers: The Movie features new footage of the girls singing to the camera, intercut with footage from the film. "Trouble" was one of the most played music videos on British music television channel The Box in August 1994. Same month, the video also received "prime break out" rotation on MTV Europe.

== Appearances ==
In addition to the Power Rangers film and soundtrack, the song featured on the soundtrack of the 1996 film Foxfire and the 1999 film Jawbreaker. The song is sung by characters in the 1997 film Blackrock, though it was not included on the film's soundtrack, and it also appears in episode three of the TV series Clueless, as well as the Daria episode "Speedtrapped". In 2007, the cast of the film St Trinians recorded a cover of the song, which was released on the film's soundtrack. The cast also recorded a music video for the song.

Zebrahead covered the song on their 2009 album Panty Raid. That same year, it was covered by Vamps, appearing as the B-side for their 2009 single "I Gotta Kick Start Now". Lyrics from the song are referenced in the 2014 single "Double Bubble Trouble" by M.I.A.

== Track listings ==
UK and Australian CD single; Japanese mini-CD single
No.	Title	Length
1.	"Trouble"	3:19
2.	"We Don't Care"	2:24
3.	"School Is Boring"	2:36

UK 7-inch and cassette single; Australian cassette single
No.	Title	Length
1.	"Trouble"	3:19
2.	"We Don't Care"	2:24

Dutch CD single
No.	Title	Length
1.	"Trouble"	3:15
2.	"School Is Boring"	2:36

US CD single
No.	Title	Length
1.	"Trouble" (LP version)	3:15

US cassette single
No.	Title	Length
1.	"Trouble"
2.	"Firebird" (performed by Graeme Revell)

UK CD single (1995)
No.	Title	Length
1.	"Trouble"	3:21
2.	"Shiny Black Taxi Cab"	3:33
3.	"Excellent"	2:18

== Charts ==
=== Weekly charts ===
Chart (1994–1995)	Peak position
Australia (ARIA)	17
Belgium (Ultratop 50 Flanders)	17
Canada Top Singles (RPM)	37
Europe (Eurochart Hot 100)	35
Finland (Suomen virallinen lista)	8
Ireland (IRMA)	23
Israel (Israeli Singles Chart)	11
Netherlands (Dutch Top 40)	20
Netherlands (Single Top 100)	16
Scottish Singles Sales (Official Charts)	17
UK Singles (Official Charts)	11
UK Airplay (Music Week)	20

=== Year-end charts ===
Chart (1994)	Position
UK Singles (OCC)	64

== Release history ==
Region	Date	Format(s)	Label(s)	Ref.
United Kingdom	18 July 1994	7-inch vinyl; CD; cassette	Food	
Japan	21 September 1994	Mini-CD	EMI; Food	
Australia	24 October 1994	CD	Food	
United States	15 May 1995	Alternative radio	Fox; I.R.S.; Atlantic	
United States	16 May 1995	Rhythmic contemporary; contemporary hit radio	Fox; I.R.S.; Atlantic	
United Kingdom (re-release)	24 July 1995	CD; cassette	Food; Fox	
