= Evanescent (song) =

Single by Vamps

from the album Vamps
- Released: May 13, 2009
- Genre: Alternative rock
- Label: Vamprose
- Songwriter(s): Hyde

Vamps singles chronology
| "I Gotta Kick Start Now" (2009) | "Evanescent" (2009) | "Sweet Dreams" (2009) |

"Evanescent" is the third single by Vamps, released on May 13, 2009. It includes a cover of the 1973 song "Life on Mars?" by David Bowie. The bass on the title track is provided by K.A.Z's former hide with Spread Beaver bandmate Chirolyn. The limited edition came with a DVD including the music video for the title track and its making of. The single reached number 4 on the Oricon chart.

== Track listing ==
| No. | Title | Lyrics | Music | Length |
|---|---|---|---|---|
| 1. | "Evanescent" | Hyde | Hyde | 4:46 |
| 2. | "Life on Mars?" | David Bowie | David Bowie | 3:59 |
