= Six Bullets (2007 film) =

- Directed by: Graham Killeen
- Written by: Graham Killeen
- Starring: Steven Koehler; Rachel Ogi; James Iaquinta; Lori Minnetti
- Cinematography: Jon Kline
- Release date: July 10, 2007
- Running time: 27 minutes
- Country: United States
- Language: English
- Budget: US$20,000

Six Bullets is an independent short western film written and directed by Graham Killeen and starring Steven Koehler. The film's narrative centers on a family torn apart by the work of an evil demon. It was Killeen's directorial debut and is credited with earning him the "Best Local Filmmaker" award from the Milwaukee Newspaper Shepherd Express in 2006.

Signal Fire Films, a small company in West Bend, formed by members of the local theater community, funded the film.

== Production ==
The first draft of the script was completed by Killeen in Wisconsin in January 2004. Various rewrites, preproduction meetings, and funding meetings took up the bulk of Killeen's time until filming began in earnest in May 2005 and concluded in November 2006.

In October 2004, local authorities gave approval for filming on North Beach in Port Washington, Wisconsin. Filming was primarily in Southeastern Wisconsin, but some second unit photography was completed in South Dakota and Minnesota. The earliest versions of the film were audience tested in June 2006, after which the film was drastically re-edited and completed in February 2007. Special visual effects were created by Little Fish Digital Studios in Wisconsin, and audio was completed by Brandaudio in Minnesota.

== Cast ==
- Steven Koehler as Father
- Rachel Ogi as Daughter
- Amanda Shalhoub as Mother
- Lori Minnetti as Clown
- Donna Gawell-Mueller as Witch
- Ben Boyd as Twin #1
- Richard Sheski as Twin #2

== Soundtrack and score ==
The original score to Six Bullets was composed by the electronica band Endless Blue and produced by Nick Mitchell, with additional support and musicians from Minneapolis, Minnesota. The score explores the traditional "downtempo" feel of previous Endless Blue recordings, but is infused with less typical instruments, including acoustic guitar, Native American rhythm instruments, strings, and piano. The soundtrack CD of the movie was released in April 2007.

== Festivals and awards ==
The film has been featured at a number of film festivals:

Festivals and Awards
Date	Festival and Award
10 July 2007	NYC Downtown Short Film Festival
21 July 2007	Pencil Head's Dusk Til Dawn Film Fest - Best Action/Adventure Film
15 September 2007	Independents' Film Festival
28 October 2007	B-Movie Film Festival
