= Repressed =

Single by Apocalyptica featuring Max Cavalera and Matt Tuck

from the album Amplified
- Released: 19 May 2006
- Genre: Cello metal, metalcore, heavy metal, groove metal, nu metal
- Label: Universal
- Songwriter(s): Eicca Toppinen, Max Cavalera, Matt Tuck

Apocalyptica singles chronology
"Life Burns!" (2005)	"Repressed" (2006)	"I'm Not Jesus" (2007)

"Repressed" is a single by Apocalyptica, released on 19 May 2006. The title song features Max Cavalera (Soulfly and Sepultura) and Matt Tuck (Bullet for my Valentine) on vocals. It's mostly sung in English and Portuguese, which parts in the last one are done by Cavalera.

== Track listing ==
1. "Repressed" (Single version) featuring Max Cavalera & Matt Tuck
2. "Path Vol.2" featuring Sandra Nasic
3. "Betrayal" (from Apocalyptica)
4. "Repressed" (Video)
