= Beast (Vamps album) =

Studio album by Vamps
- Released: July 28, 2010
- Recorded: 2010
- Genres: Hard rock; alternative rock
- Length: 50:43
- Languages: Japanese, English
- Label: Vamprose
- Producer: Vamps

Vamps chronology
Vamps (2009)	Beast (2010)	Sex Blood Rock n' Roll (2013)

Singles from Beast
- 1. "Devil Side" Released: May 12, 2010; 2. "Angel Trip" Released: June 09, 2010; 3. "Memories" Released: December 15, 2010

Beast is the second album by Vamps, released on July 28, 2010. The limited edition includes a DVD with the music videos for the songs: "Devil Side", "Angel Trip", "Revolution" and "My First Last". The album reached number 3 on the Oricon chart.

== Track listing ==
All lyrics are written by Hyde.

No.	Title	Music	Length
1.	"Plug In"	Hyde	0:31
2.	"Devil Side"	Hyde	4:21
3.	"Angel Trip"	K.A.Z	4:22
4.	"Memories"	K.A.Z	4:37
5.	"Euphoria"	Hyde	4:30
6.	"Vamp Addiction"	K.A.Z	3:10
7.	"Revolution"	Hyde	4:41
8.	"The Past"	K.A.Z	5:05
9.	"Piano Duet"	K.A.Z	4:34
10.	"Rumble"	K.A.Z	3:30
11.	"Get Up"	Hyde	4:26
12.	"Samsara"	K.A.Z	1:54
13.	"My First Last"	Hyde	5:02

Disc two (DVD, limited edition only)

No.	Title	Length
1.	"Devil Side" (Music video)
2.	"Angel Trip" (Music video)
3.	"Revolution" (Music video)
4.	"My First Last" (Music video)
