= Jon Kline =

American cinematographer and filmmaker

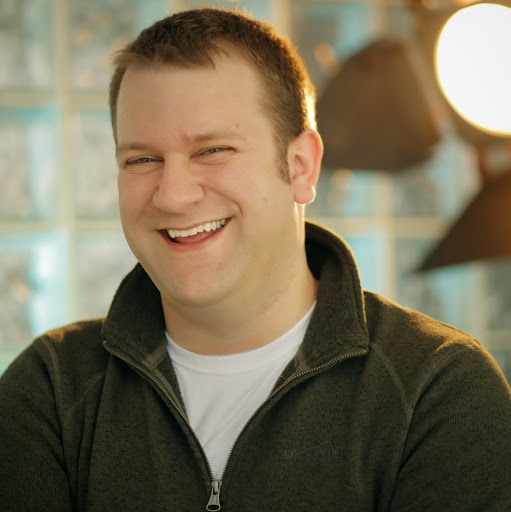
- Kline in November 2014
- Born: Jonathan David Kline; May 22, 1980 (age 46); Corvallis, Oregon, U.S.
- Education: University of Wisconsin–Oshkosh
- Occupations: Cinematographer, Filmmaker
- Height: 6 ft 6 in (198 cm)
- Partner: Anna Pesok Kline (2013–present)
- Website: JonKline.com

Jonathan David Kline (born May 22, 1980, in Corvallis, Oregon, United States) is an American cinematographer and filmmaker, known for his work on television, commercials, and films.

== Biography ==
Jon Kline earned his first cinematographer credit in 2007 on the short film Six Bullets. His other notable credits include cinematographer on the music video "Tiderays" by Volcano Choir. He founded MKE Production Rental, an audiovisual equipment rental company, in Milwaukee in 2013. He currently lives in Chicago with his wife, Anna Pesok Kline.

== Filmography ==
- Screen: Righter (Short) (2016) (camera operator)
- Hate in America (TV Special documentary) (2015) (camera operator)
- Dateline NBC (TV Series documentary) (2015) (camera operator)
- Hi, Neighbor (Short) (2014) (cinematographer)
- Take the Night (Short) (2014) (cinematographer)
- Game Day (Short) (2014) (cinematographer)
- The Surface (Feature film) (2014) (camera operator)
- The Noize (Short) (2013) (cinematographer)
- Gunfight at Yuma (Feature film) (2012) (cinematographer)
- Until Death (Short) (2012) (director of photography)
- Everybody's Gay (Short) (2011) (cinematographer)
- Condition One (Short) (2010) (best boy)
- The Outdoor Room (TV Series) (2010) (assistant camera)
- Ward Three (Short) (2009) (assistant camera)
- Weird Tales #2: Into Death Valley's Underground (Documentary film) (2008) (additional camera)
- Brothers (Short) (2008) (assistant camera)
- Six Bullets (Short) (2007) (cinematographer)
