= I Gotta Kick Start Now =

Single by Vamps

from the album Vamps
- Released: March 13, 2009
- Genre: Hard rock
- Label: Vamprose
- Songwriter(s): Hyde

Vamps singles chronology
"Love Addict" (2008)	"I Gotta Kick Start Now" (2009)	"Evanescent" (2009)

"I Gotta Kick Start Now" is the second single by Vamps, released on March 13, 2009. It includes a cover of the 1994 song "Trouble" by British duo Shampoo. The limited edition came with a DVD that includes the music video for the title track and its making of. The single reached number 6 on the Oricon chart.

== Track listing ==
No.	Title	Lyrics	Music	Length
1.	"I Gotta Kick Start Now"	Hyde	Hyde	4:35
2.	"Trouble"	Caroline Askew	Caroline Askew	3:31
