= Memories (Vamps song) =

Single by Vamps

from the album Beast
- Released: December 15, 2010
- Genre: Alternative rock
- Label: Vamprose
- Songwriter(s): Hyde, K.A.Z
- Producer(s): Vamps

Vamps singles chronology
"Angel Trip" (2010)	"Memories" (2010)	"Ahead/Replay" (2013)

"Memories" is the seventh single by Vamps, released on December 15, 2010. The limited edition came with a DVD that includes the music videos for "Piano Duet" and "Memories". The single reached number 4 on the Oricon chart.

"Memories" was used as the December 2010 ending theme of the TBS TV show Hiruobi!. The B-side is an alternative version of "Get Up" translated into Japanese. A cover of this version of the song was used in the Bakuman anime sung by the character Koogy, who is voiced by Showtaro Morikubo. This version was released as a real-world single by Koogy on February 23, 2010, with the B-side being a Japanese cover of Vamps' "Euphoria".

== Track listing ==
No.	Title	Lyrics	Music	Length
1.	"Memories"	Hyde	K.A.Z	4:38
2.	"Get Up -Japanese Ver.-"	Hyde	Hyde	4:25
