= Angel Trip =

Single by Vamps

from the album Beast
- Released: June 9, 2010
- Genre: Hard rock
- Length: 4:23
- Label: Vamprose
- Songwriter(s): Hyde, K.A.Z
- Producer(s): Vamps

Vamps singles chronology
"Devil Side" (2010)	"Angel Trip" (2010)	"Memories" (2010)

"Angel Trip" is the sixth single by Vamps, released on June 9, 2010. The B-side features a cover, "Satsugai" a song originally written by K.A.Z for the Detroit Metal City live-action film, with some of the lyrics altered. The limited edition came with a DVD that includes the music video for the title track and its making of. The single reached number 4 on the Oricon Chart.

== Track listing ==
No.	Title	Lyrics	Music	Length
1.	"Angel Trip"	Hyde	K.A.Z	4:23
2.	"Kyuketsu -Satsugai Vamps Ver.-"	Kiminori Wakasugi	K.A.Z	3:23
