= Sweet Dreams (Vamps song) =

Single by Vamps

from the album Vamps
- Released: September 30, 2009
- Genre: Rock
- Label: Vamprose

Vamps singles chronology
"Evanescent" (2009)	"Sweet Dreams" (2009)	"Devil Side" (2010)

"Sweet Dreams" is the fourth single by Vamps, released on September 30, 2009. This single version is slightly different from the album's. The limited edition came with a DVD of the music videos for both songs. The single reached number 2 on the Oricon chart.

== Track listing ==
No.	Title	Lyrics	Music	Length
1.	"Sweet Dreams"	Hyde	K.A.Z	5:50
2.	"Sweet Dreams - Acoustic"	Hyde	K.A.Z	5:47
