= Sin in Justice =

"Sin In Justice"

Single by Vamps

from the album Underworld
- Released: November 20, 2015
- Label: Spinefarm
- Songwriter(s): Hyde, K.A.Z
- Producer(s): Vamps

Vamps singles chronology
"Vampire's Love" (2014)	"Sin In Justice" (2015)	"Inside of Me" (2016)

"Sin In Justice" is a collaborative single by the Japanese rock duo VAMPS and the Finnish cello metal band Apocalyptica. It was released on November 20, 2015 as a digital single. This is the band's eleventh single and also the first one from their album Underworld.

Whilst touring together in the US in earlier of 2015, Apocalyptica and VAMPS discussed the idea of doing more work together, as a result of which – in addition to the six UK shows later that month – the musicians have joined forces for a fresh piece of music: ‘SIN IN JUSTICE’, backed up by a lyric video put together by Craig Gowans, who has recently worked with both Killing Joke and Atreyu.

For VAMPS, this is the first time they have collaborated with classically trained players, and it is an experience they found inspiring.

== Track listing ==
No.	Title	Lyrics	Music	Length
1.	"Sin In Justice"	HYDE	K.A.Z	4:54

== Personnel ==
VAMPS

- K.A.Z - guitar, production
- HYDE - vocals, production

Apocalyptica

- Mikko Sirén - drums, production
- Eicca Toppinen - violoncello, production, programming
- Paavo Lötjönen - violoncello, production
- Perttu Kivilaakso - violoncello, production

Crew

- Kane Churko - bass, mastering
- Josh Wilbur - mixing
- Chieko Nakayama - vocal direction
- Akira Watanabe - recording technician
