= We Are Shampoo =

Studio album by Shampoo
- Released: 1994
- Genre: Pop
- Label: Food Records
- Producer: Conall Fitzpatrick

Shampoo chronology
We Are Shampoo (1994)	Shampoo or Nothing (1995)

Singles from We Are Shampoo
- 1. "Trouble" Released: 18 July 1994; 2. "Viva La Megababes" Released: 3 October 1994; 3. "Delicious" Released: 1995

Professional ratings
Review scores
Source	Rating
AllMusic	3/5 stars
Melody Maker	(favorable)
Music & Media	(favorable)
NME	8/10
Select	3/5 medals
Smash Hits	4/5

We Are Shampoo is the debut album by British female pop duo Shampoo. It was released in 1994 by Food Records and features their hit singles "Trouble" and "Viva La Megababes". The album peaked at number 45 on the UK Albums Chart and number eight in Japan.

== Critical reception ==
Paul Lester from Melody Maker wrote, "We Are Shampoo is very possibly the least emotional record of all time. It is hollow, it is calculated, it is a triumph of artifice over authenticity, and it is very nearly brilliant." Music & Media commented, "'Viva La Megababes'. Our favourite "Lolita" pop duo has only got one simple message in life: have fun! Correction: have lots of fun! Cyndi Lauper could've told ya. School, parents, boys—they're all dead boring. That attitude is convincingly reflected in every note. The Ramonesque overtones, the bubble gum tunes and the countless recycled guitar riffs make a winning combination, and not just for bored schoolgirls. It's 'Delicious' indeed! 'Dirty Old Love Song' is the best antidote to too obvious Christmas number 1 pretenders. Enjoy it while it lasts."

Mark Sutherland from NME said, "Because, from the very first Uh-oh in the chart-eating slab of undiluted genius that is "Trouble", We Are Shampoo cavorts with the froth and vigour of only the very finest, most transiently pleasurable pop albums." Mark Frith from Smash Hits wrote, "And don't you just know it! The shouting! The screeching guitar! Imagine having to sit through 12 tracks of that! Well, generally it's fab, especially the ultra-catchy 'Delicious' and the Mariah and Whitney slag-off, 'Dirty Old Love Song' and the ode to getting home after midnight, 'Shiny Black Taxi Cab', which contains the greatest line to ever appear in a popular music song: When you throw-up/You feel bad/in a shiny black taxi cab. It goes a bit wrong halfway through the second half but these are no one-hit wonders."

== Track listing ==
1. "Trouble" – 3:21
2. "Delicious" – 3:00
3. "Viva La Megababes" – 3:35
4. "Dirty Old Love Song" – 3:53
5. "Skinny White Thing" – 3:08
6. "Glimmer Globe" – 2:45
7. "Shiny Black Taxi Cab" – 3:31
8. "Me Hostage" – 3:00
9. "Game Boy" – 4:05
10. "House of Love" – 3:29
11. "Shampoo You" – 2:43
12. "Saddo" – 2:25
