= Inside of Me (Vamps song) =

Single by Vamps

from the album Underworld
- Released: August 31, 2016
- Genre: Rock
- Label: Spinefarm
- Songwriter(s): Hyde, Howard Benson, Lenny Skolnik, Seann Bowe, Richard Z. Kruspe
- Producer(s): Vamps, Howard Benson

Vamps singles chronology
| "Sin In Justice" (2015) | "Inside of Me" (2016) | "Calling" (2017) |

"Inside of Me" is the twelfth single by Vamps released on August 31, 2016. This is the second single from the album Underworld.

The single was created and recorded overseas, in the United States, and produced by Howard Benson.

The title-track features Chris Motionless, lead singer of the American metalcore band Motionless in White. The coupling track on the single Rise or Die also features another renowned name, with the guitarist of German industrial metal band Rammstein, Richard Z. Kruspe, lending his guitar and composing skills for the song. Kruspe had originally written and demoed the song for his side project Emigrate. Vamps heard it and thought it would be a good song for them and asked him if they could use it.

The single reached number 7 on the Oricon chart.

== Track listing ==
| No. | Title | Lyrics | Music | Length |
|---|---|---|---|---|
| 1. | "Inside of Me" (featuring Chris Motionless of Motionless in White) | Hyde, Howard Benson, Lenny Skolnik, Seann Bowe | Hyde | 3:28 |
| 2. | "Rise or Die" (featuring Richard Z. Kruspe of Emigrate/Rammstein) | Richard Z. Kruspe, Hyde, Howard Benson, Lenny Skolnik, Seann Bowe | Richard Z. Kruspe, Hyde, Howard Benson, Lenny Skolnik, Seann Bowe | 3:19 |
