= Vamps (album) =

Studio album by Vamps
- Released: June 10, 2009
- Recorded: 2009
- Genre: Hard rock; alternative rock
- Length: 50:58
- Language: English, Japanese
- Label: Vamprose
- Producer: Vamps

Vamps chronology
Vamps (2009)	Beast (2010)

Alternative Covers
- Limited edition's cover

Singles from Vamps
- 1. "Love Addict" Released: July 02, 2008; 2. "I Gotta Kick Start Now" Released: March 13, 2009; 3. "Evanescent" Released: May 13, 2009; 4. "Sweet Dreams" Released: September 30, 2009

Vamps is the debut album by Japanese rock duo Vamps, released on June 10, 2009. It reached number on 3 the Oricon Albums Chart, and was certified Gold by the RIAJ.

== Overview ==
Vamps was formed in 2008. After working together on Hyde's solo career since 2003, the singer said he came to value K.A.Z's input so much, that he decided to form a band with him instead of using his own name.

Vamps chose "Love Addict" as the album's first song because they felt it symbolized the entire album. They tried not to make the song too fast as they wanted people to be able to dance to it, and added an "edgy guitar."

"Time Goes By" was originally created while the two worked on Hyde's 2006 album Faith, but they felt the refrain was not catchy enough. It was only after listening to it again for Vamps' first single, that K.A.Z came up with a new idea for it.

== Release ==
The limited edition includes a DVD with the music videos for the album's three singles: "Love Addict", "I Gotta Kick Start Now" and "Evanescent", as well as the video for "Trouble" (the B-side of "I Gotta Kick Start Now"), which features Anza.

== Reception ==
The album reached number on 3 the Oricon Albums Chart, was certified Gold by the RIAJ for sales over 100,000, and received generally positive reviews. Time magazine praised the album's "chugging three-chord rock", and said "all the hallmarks of classic Japanese rock are here, but amped up and hardened for a more streetwise generation."

== Track listing ==
All lyrics are written by Hyde. Mixed by Josh Wilbur.

No.	Title	Music	Length
1.	"Bite"	Hyde	0:25
2.	"Love Addict"	Hyde	4:00
3.	"Cosmos"	K.A.Z	4:35
4.	"Secret in My Heart"	K.A.Z	4:15
5.	"Evanescent"	Hyde	4:28
6.	"Vampire Depression"	K.A.Z	4:41
7.	"Redrum"	K.A.Z	3:48
8.	"Deep Red"	K.A.Z	5:25
9.	"I Gotta Kick Start Now"	Hyde	4:33
10.	"Time Goes By"	Hyde, K.A.Z	4:10
11.	"Sweet Dreams"	K.A.Z	5:44
12.	"Hunting"	K.A.Z	1:56
13.	"Sex Blood Rock n' Roll"	Hyde	2:50

Disc two (DVD, limited edition only)

No.	Title	Length
1.	"Love Addict" (music video)
2.	"I Gotta Kick Start Now" (music video)
3.	"Trouble" (music video)
4.	"Evanescent" (music video)
