= Dracula Untold =

2014 American action horror film by Gary Shore

- Theatrical release poster
- Directed by: Gary Shore
- Screenplay by: Matt Sazama; Burk Sharpless
- Based on: Dracula: Year One by; Matt Sazama; Burk Sharpless; Dracula by Bram Stoker
- Produced by: Michael De Luca
- Starring: Luke Evans; Dominic Cooper; Sarah Gadon; Charles Dance
- Cinematography: John Schwartzman
- Edited by: Richard Pearson
- Music by: Ramin Djawadi
- Production companies: Universal Pictures; Legendary Pictures; Michael De Luca Productions
- Distributed by: Universal Pictures
- Release date: October 10, 2014
- Running time: 92 minutes
- Country: United States
- Language: English
- Budget: $70–100 million
- Box office: $220.2 million

Dracula Untold is a 2014 American action horror film directed by Gary Shore in his feature film debut, and written by Matt Sazama and Burk Sharpless. Based on an original screenplay by Sazama and Sharpless, the plot creates an origin story for the title character, rather than using the storyline of Bram Stoker's Dracula. In this adaptation, Dracula is the historical figure Vlad III "the Impaler" Dracula and transforms into his monstrous alter ego to protect his family and kingdom from Ottoman Sultan Mehmed II. Luke Evans portrays the title character, with Sarah Gadon, Dominic Cooper, Art Parkinson and Charles Dance cast in supporting roles. Principal photography began in Northern Ireland on August 5, 2013. Universal Pictures released the film in regular and IMAX cinemas on October 10, 2014. Dracula Untold grossed $220 million worldwide and received mixed reviews from critics.

== Plot ==
In the 15th century, Vlad Dracula is the Prince of Wallachia and Transylvania. As royal ward of the Ottoman Empire's Sultan, Vlad was trained since a young age to join the Sultan's elite janissary corps. He became their most feared warrior, earning the moniker "Vlad the Impaler, Son of the Dragon". After becoming sickened by his own exploits, he retires and rules his domains in peace.

Discovering a helmet in a stream, Vlad fears that an Ottoman scouting party is preparing for an invasion. Following the stream to a cave in Broken Tooth Mountain, Vlad's retinue are attacked by a humanoid creature which kills all of his soldiers. Vlad barely escapes and returns to his castle. He learns from Brother Lucian, a Romanian Orthodox Christian monk, that the creature is a vampire. Once a General from the Roman legions named Caligula, it was tricked by a demon for power, but was trapped in the cave.

As Vlad celebrates an Orthodox Christian Easter-feast with his wife Mirena and son Ingeras, an Ottoman contingent arrives at the castle. The emissary demands a tribute of boys for Sultan Mehmed II, including Vlad's son. Desperate to save his son, Vlad returns to Broken Tooth Mountain to seek help from the Master Vampire.

The vampire offers Vlad blood that temporarily gives him its powers. If he resists the intense urge to drink human blood for the next three days, he will turn back into a human. Otherwise, he will remain a vampire forever, and the ancient vampire will be freed. Vlad drinks its blood and is given superhuman strength and supernatural abilities, including the ability to transform into a cloud of bats. Vlad returns to the castle in time to catch a squad of soldiers and single-handedly kills them all. He then sends most of the castle's subjects to Cozia Monastery for safety.

On the way to the monastery, a Romani man called Shkelgim identifies Vlad as a vampire, and offers his blood and service. Vlad rejects it, but struggles with his thirst. The next morning, he tells Mirena what he's become, and orders her and their people to continue on while he waits for sunset to follow. As night falls, the Turks attack the refugees, until Vlad arrives and kills them.

At the monastery, the soldiers prepare for battle, and Ingeras questions Vlad on the locked vault where his old armor is kept. Brother Lucian exposes Vlad as a vampire, and the inhabitants attempt to burn him alive, only for Vlad to emerge unscathed. He scolds them for the attempt.

That night, the Ottoman army marches on the monastery. Vlad commands an enormous swarm of bats to repel them, but the soldiers are actually a decoy force, allowing a handful of Turks to infiltrate the monastery, kill many inhabitants, and kidnap Ingeras. Trying to defend her son, Mirena falls off the monastery wall. Despite his superhuman speed, Vlad fails to reach her in time. A dying Mirena pleads with Vlad to drink her blood and stay a vampire in exchange for the strength to save their son. Vlad reluctantly complies, triggering his final transformation into a full-blooded vampire. Simultaneously, the magical seal trapping the Master Vampire inside his cave is broken, setting him free. Vlad returns to the monastery and turns the survivors into vampires before he conjures black storm clouds to block out the sun.

At the Ottoman army's camp, Mehmed prepares for the invasion of Christian Europe. While his vampire soldiers arrive and slaughter Ottoman soldiers, Vlad goes after Mehmed, who is holding Ingeras captive. Aware of vampires' weakness, Mehmed lines the floor of his tent with silver coins and fights Vlad with a silver sword. He overpowers Vlad and prepares to impale him with a wooden stake. Vlad, however, evades Mehmed, kills him with the stake and drinks his blood.

When Vlad leaves with Ingeras, he realizes that his subjects have lost their humanity and want to kill Ingeras and drink his blood. Brother Lucian arrives, fending off the vampires with his cross to save Ingeras. Vlad tearfully says goodbye to his son before dispelling the storm clouds so that all the vampires, including himself, will burn away and die in the light. Shkelgim, however, drags his body out of the sunlight and drips his own blood onto Vlad's lips, restoring the vampire to life. Ingeras is crowned the new Prince of Wallachia as Europe is free from Ottoman invasion.

In the present day, Vlad meets a woman named Mina in London who appears to be a reincarnation of his late wife Mirena. The Master Vampire watches them from afar while leaving.

== Cast ==
- Luke Evans as Vlad III "the Impaler" Dracula / Dracula: Known as the Son of the Dragon, Vlad is a prince and war hero, who becomes a monster known as a vampire to protect and defend his family and kingdom.
- Dominic Cooper as Sultan Mehmed II
- Sarah Gadon as Mirena, Vlad's wife
  - Gadon also portrays Mina as a part of the present-day ending.
- Art Parkinson as Ingeras, son of Vlad and Mirena
- Charles Dance as the Master Vampire, the one who turns Vlad into a vampire
- William Houston as Cazan, Vlad's advisor
- Diarmaid Murtagh as Dumitru, one of Vlad's men
- Noah Huntley as Captain Petru, one of Vlad's men
- Paul Kaye as Brother Lucian, a monk
- Zach McGowan as Shkelgim, a mysterious Romani
- Ferdinand Kingsley as Hamza Bey, one of Mehmed's generals
- Joseph Long as Turahanoğlu Ömer Bey, one of Mehmed's generals
- Thor Kristjansson as Bright Eyes, an assassin in the Ottoman Army
- Dilan Gwyn as Ingeras's governess

== Production ==
=== Development ===
Anybody who's going to the film expecting a horror film, is going to be sorely disappointed. For me, it was telling a story. I was trying to tell a good drama, that has action-adventure elements to it.

— Gary Shore, director

In 2007, director Alex Proyas was hired by Universal Pictures to direct the film Dracula: Year Zero. The film was to be produced by Michael De Luca and filmed in Australia. Later, Universal ended the deals with Proyas and scheduled star Sam Worthington because of the high budget. In 2012, Irish director Gary Shore was attached to direct the film. Matt Sazama and Burk Sharpless wrote the script for the new film. The film was scheduled for release on August 8, 2014, later changed to October 10. Legendary Pictures was co-financing the film, with full involvement in May 2014.

=== Casting ===
In 2010, Sam Worthington was in negotiations to play Vlad the Impaler, and the film was set for release in 2011, officially signing to star in the film that August. In 2012, when Universal terminated the deal with director Alex Proyas, Sam Worthington backed out from the project and was replaced by Luke Evans the following year in April, playing the role of Vlad the Impaler, the man who would become the mythological bloodsucker Dracula. Other cast members who were cast in 2013 include Sarah Gadon and Dominic Cooper. Zach McGowan was also cast, in the role of Shkelgim, a Romani chief. Samantha Barks joined the cast to play a character from Slavic folk tales known as Baba Yaga, a beautiful young woman who transforms into a savage witch, but her scenes were later cut from the film. Along with Barks more cast was added, including Charlie Cox (who was cast as Caligula, but his scenes were later cut), Charles Dance, Ferdinand Kingsley, William Houston and Thor Kristjansson, the latter of whom would play the role of Bright Eyes, an Eastern European taken as a slave as a young boy and now an assassin in the Ottoman Army. Art Parkinson then joined on to play the role of Ingeras, son of Dracula.

=== Filming ===
The shooting of Dracula Untold took place in Northern Ireland from August to November 2013, officially beginning on August 5, starting in Roe Valley Country Park in Northern Ireland. The production company received permission for two days of shooting, on August 5–6, to film in the park. Other location shooting took place throughout Northern Ireland.

During filming, Luke Evans received training every day after work, rehearsed with the stuntmen, and ate only chicken, beef, fish and green vegetables to get ready for the shoot of the film.

=== Music ===
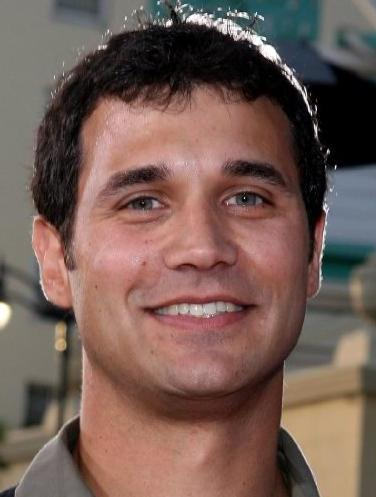
Ramin Djawadi, the composer of the Dracula Untold score

Ramin Djawadi's score for the film was released by Backlot Music on October 7 on CD. Djawadi was originally chosen to work on the film's musical score after his work on Iron Man, Clash of the Titans and Game of Thrones, and after signing on to score the film, he gave up his job of scoring the film Edge of Tomorrow, which was given to Christophe Beck. The official trailer features Lorde's cover of "Everybody Wants to Rule the World", which was produced by Michael A. Levine and Lucas Cantor. The Japanese release of the trailer uses the song "Vampire's Love" by Vamps.

== Release ==
Dracula Untold was originally scheduled for release on August 8, 2014. The film was later delayed and released on October 10. The film was released in all formats including IMAX, and in over 25 foreign markets, on its opening weekend.

=== Home media ===
Dracula Untold was released on DVD and Blu-ray on February 3, 2015. The Blu-ray release comes with an alternate opening, deleted scenes, The Land of Dracula (Interactive Map), and Luke Evans: Creating a Legend. A 4K Ultra HD Blu-ray was released on September 12, 2017.

== Reception ==
=== Box office ===
Dracula Untold grossed $56 million in North America and $164.2 million in other territories for a worldwide total of $220.2 million against a budget of $70 million.

==== North America ====
Dracula Untold was released in North America on October 10, 2014, across 2,885 cinemas. It earned $1.3 million from Thursday late-night showings from 2,133 theaters and $8.9 million in its opening day. The film debuted at #2 at the box office in its opening weekend grossing $24.5 million behind Gone Girl. Four million dollars of the opening gross came from IMAX showings from 351 of its 2,887 locations which is the second-best October total behind only Gravity. Nine of the top 10 locations as well as 18 of the top 20 were in IMAX. The film played 57% male and 61% over-25-year-olds. In its second weekend the film fell 58% and earned $9.9 million.

==== Other territories ====
A few days ahead of its U.S. debut, Dracula Untold was released in 25 foreign markets and earned $21 million. It had a strong $5 million four-day opening in Mexico. The highest debuts came from Australia ($9 million), Germany ($4 million), Malaysia ($3 million) and France ($1 million). The following weekend the film was released to over 42 foreign territories and earned $33.9 million. The film went number one in nine of the 17 new-released territories. It earned $2.5 million from 155 IMAX screens for an overall total of $4.5 million and an international total of $8.5 million. It went #1 in Bolivia, Colombia, Czech Republic, Ecuador, Philippines, Slovakia, Thailand, Trinidad and Vietnam. The film was released to four new markets in its third weekend and earned $14.7 million from 59 territories where Brazil generated $2.7 million and Spain collected $1.8 million. The film opened in Italy at #1 earning $3 million accounting 25% of the market shares. In Japan it earned $1.4 million.

=== Critical reception ===
On Rotten Tomatoes the film has an approval rating of 26% based on 133 reviews with an average rating of 4.5/10. The site's critical consensus reads: "Neither awful enough to suck nor sharp enough to bite, Dracula Untold misses the point of its iconic character's deathless appeal". On Metacritic, the film has a score of 40 out of 100 based on reviews from 30 critics, indicating "mixed or average" reviews. Audiences polled by CinemaScore gave the film an average grade of "A−" on an A+ to F scale.

Frank Scheck of The Hollywood Reporter gave a negative review and compared it with I, Frankenstein. The Village Voice's Alan Scherstuhl criticized the film, saying that the greatest villain in cinema "was bitten on the neck and drained of his hottest blood". Simon Adams for Roger Ebert's website gave Dracula Untold a score of 2.5/4 along with an average review, commenting: "If you can selectively ignore this litany of inanity, you may find some substantial earthy pleasures in Dracula Untold". Kyle Anderson of Entertainment Weekly gave the film a C grade and wrote the film works neither as a sweeping historical epic nor as an action-horror hybrid. Stephen Whitty wrote a negative review for The Star-Ledger: "If this Dracula can kill hundreds of enemies by himself—and he can, and does, in several dull and protracted battle scenes—then where's the suspense? If he's become a monster for noble reasons, then where's the dark conflict?" The Seattle Times' Moira MacDonald said that the film falls into a category of studio offerings that are not good enough to be noteworthy or terrible enough to be truly entertaining.

A. A. Dowd of The A.V. Club and Bilge Ebiri of New York magazine gave a mildly positive review, commenting that the film is neither the worst nor the definitive adaptation of Dracula that they expected. Film critic Mick LaSalle gave the film two stars out of four and wrote for San Francisco Chronicle that Dracula Untold brings together elements from other more popular films. Daniel Krupa from IGN said that Dracula Untold recasts the famous vampire as a dark superhero and called the film a "fast-paced", "shallow" fun. Tim Robey of The Telegraph was positive to the film, commending acting of Luke Evans as Dracula, and considered to be superior to Snow White and the Huntsman from 2012. Michael O'Sullivan of The Washington Post reviewed and responded negatively to the film; although positive to visual effects, he considered that the film too much borrowed the elements from superhero films and comic books. Jordan Hoffman of New York Daily News praised the costume design and film interiors. Kevin C. Johnson for St. Louis Post-Dispatch said that Dracula Untold feels longer than its 95-minute running time.

Brian Truitt of USA Today reacted negatively to Dracula Untold and said the film flirts with dullness. Toronto Star's Peter Howell asked: "Whatever possessed the makers of Dracula Untold to think we'd be interested in a tragically unhip romance that backstories the infamous bloodsucker?" The Boston Globe's Peter Keough criticized the film in several aspects. Film critic Ben Kenigsberg reviewed the film for The New York Times and commented that the classic tale of Dracula is drowned in computer-generated murk. James Berardinelli reviewed for website ReelViews and said that Dracula Untold is a generic vampire tale in the vein of Underworld franchise, combined with Van Helsing (2004) than a memorable re-interpretation of a legendary monster. The Philadelphia Inquirer's David Hiltbrand said the film attempts to humanize one of the most fearful monsters in the Western crypt, but thought that it goes way overboard, past domestication and into canonization. Wesley Morris for the website Grantland was generally negative to the film.

Richard Corliss from Time compared Dracula's origin story to Jesus Christ's story due to Dracula spending his childhood in a foreign land, and due to Dracula choosing to die (or become undead) in order to save his people. Corliss also complimented the film's use of its PG-13 rating by describing it as "robust". In his review, he wrote that the reviewers slammed the film, but Corliss was more positive. He later said that Evans carries Untold by admirably fulfilling the two essential functions of a period-movie hero: to enunciate comic-book dialogue with Shakespearean authority and his "great" look with his shirt off. Graham Killeen of Milwaukee Journal Sentinel gave a positive review and wrote that Dracula Untold tries to be The Lord of the Rings of horror movies. Kofi Outlaw of Screen Rant gave a fairly moderate review to the film, stating that Dracula Untold is not a masterful or deep re-introduction to the franchise, but as basic genre fare, called it a "relatively" fun in its depiction of the monster in a different light. Los Angeles Times critic Gary Goldstein wrote a positive review, saying Dracula Untold is an "absorbing", "swiftly comprehensive" origin tale.

Years after its release, Dracula Untold (2014) would get positive attention from the public. In 2022, Michael John Petty from Collider wrote an article in defense of the film as a refreshing take on Dracula to humanize the character: "The way that Vlad fights for his wife, his son, and his country is a completely unique take on the character that encourages us, as with Mary Shelley's Frankenstein, to take a deeper, more intentional look at the monster".

=== Accolades ===
At the 41st Saturn Awards, Dracula Untold won Best Horror Film and was nominated for Best Costume and Best Make-up. It was nominated for Favorite Thriller Movie at the 41st People's Choice Awards. The film received nominations for Best Music and Best Horror Poster at the 2015 Golden Trailer Awards.

== Legacy ==
One week before the film's release, the tabloids reported that reshoots took place shortly after the end of production to tie the film into the planned cinematic universe. A representative from Universal later denied that Dracula Untold was meant to start any sort of universe. Producer Alissa Phillips hoped that Evans's character might have a cameo in a future The Mummy film and also spoke of a potential sequel to Dracula to reboot the franchise. Director Gary Shore commented that the film was optional for Universal to use it as a launching pad for the franchise. After the release of Dracula Untold, the connections to the shared universe were downplayed, and The Mummy (2017) was re-positioned as the first film in the series.

By January 2019, after the failure of The Mummy film, Universal had decided to return to standalone features instead of using a shared film narrative, effectively ending the Dark Universe.

== See also ==
- List of vampire films
