= Apocalyptica (album) =

Studio album by Apocalyptica
- Released: 24 January 2005
- Studio: SUSI Studios
- Genre: Cello metal, symphonic metal, neo-classical metal, progressive metal
- Length: 51:35
- Label: Universal Music Germany/Vertigo
- Producer: Apocalyptica

Apocalyptica chronology
Reflections (2003)	Apocalyptica (2005)	Worlds Collide (2006)

Singles from Untitled Apocalyptica album
- 1. "Bittersweet" Released: 29 November 2004; 2. "Quutamo/Wie Weit/How Far/En Vie" Released: 14 & 23 February 2005; 3. "Life Burns!" Released: 11 April 2005

Apocalyptica is the fifth studio album by the Finnish symphonic metal band of same name. Although Mikko Sirén has been with Apocalyptica two years prior to this release, he was not an official member of the band until after this release, but this is still his first release with the band along with the band having a drummer for their first time.

The song "Life Burns!" is featured on the soundtrack of the video game Burnout Revenge. "Deathzone" ends at 4:34, after that, there is 2:06 of silence and at 6:40, a hidden track, "En Vie" starts, which is 3:27 long. Bonus tracks "How Far" and "Wie Weit" are alternate versions of the hidden track, with English and German lyrics, respectively. Tracks 1, 4, 7, 9, 11 (Both), and "Wie Weit" were on Amplified // A Decade of Reinventing the Cello.

== Track listing ==
No.	Title	Note	Length
1.	"Life Burns!"	Guest vocals	3:06
2.	"Quutamo"	Instrumental	3:27
3.	"Distraction"	Instrumental	3:56
4.	"Bittersweet"	Guest vocals	4:25
5.	"Misconstruction"	Instrumental	3:55
6.	"Fisheye"	Instrumental	4:09
7.	"Farewell"	Instrumental	5:32
8.	"Fatal Error"	Instrumental	2:59
9.	"Betrayal/Forgiveness"	Instrumental	5:13
10.	"Ruska"	Instrumental	4:39
11.	"Deathzone: "En Vie"	Instrumental	10:14
Total length:			51:35

Special non-U.S. branch iTunes version bonus tracks
No.	Title	Note	Length
12.	"My Friend of Misery" (Metallica cover)	Instrumental	5:17
13.	"South of Heaven / Mandatory Suicide" (Slayer cover)	Instrumental	5:27
Total length:			62:19

Special edition bonus tracks
No.	Title	Note	Length
12.	"How Far"	Guest vocals	3:29
13.	"Wie weit"	Guest vocals	3:29
14.	"Bittersweet" (music video)	Guest vocals	3:21
Total length:			62:04

== Reception ==
Professional ratings
Review scores
Source	Rating
AllMusic	3/5 stars
Collector's Guide to Heavy Metal	8/10
Rock Hard	9/10

In 2005, Apocalyptica was ranked number 483 in Rock Hard magazine's book of The 500 Greatest Rock & Metal Albums of All Time.

== Credits ==
=== Apocalyptica ===
- Eicca Toppinen – cello, programming, music (1–6, 10, 11 & special edition bonus tracks)
- Perttu Kivilaakso – cello, programming, music (7–9)
- Paavo Lötjönen – cello

=== Additional personnel ===
==== Drummers ====
- Mikko Sirén – on (1–8 & 10–14); programming
- Dave Lombardo – on "Betrayal/Forgiveness"

==== Vocalists / Lyricists ====
Bittersweet

- Lauri Ylönen – also on "Life Burns!"
- Ville Valo

Quutamo/Wie Weit/How Far/En Vie

- Manu – on "En Vie"
- Marta Jandová – on "How Far" & "Wie Weit"

==== Double bassist ====
- Mikko Moilanen – on "Betrayal/Forgiveness" & "Deathzone"

==== Writers on "My Friend of Misery" ====
Songwriter

- James Hetfield

Co-Composers

- Lars Ulrich
- Jason Newsted

==== Writers on "South of Heaven" / "Mandatory Suicide"" ====
- Tom Araya
- Jeff Hanneman
- Kerry King

== Charts ==
=== Weekly charts ===
Chart (2005)	Peak position
Austrian Albums (Ö3 Austria)	6
Belgian Albums (Ultratop Flanders)	66
Dutch Albums (Album Top 100)	76
Finnish Albums (Suomen virallinen lista)	2
French Albums (SNEP)	61
German Albums (Offizielle Top 100)	5
Swiss Albums (Schweizer Hitparade)	6

=== Year-end charts ===
Chart (2005)	Position
German Albums (Offizielle Top 100)	95
