= Love Addict (Vamps song) =

Single by Vamps

from the album Vamps
- Released: July 2, 2008
- Genre: Hard rock
- Label: Vamprose
- Songwriter(s): Hyde

Vamps singles chronology
"Love Addict" (2008)	"I Gotta Kick Start Now" (2009)

"Love Addict" is the debut single by Japanese rock duo Vamps, released on July 2, 2008. It reached number 2 on the Oricon Singles Chart and was certified Gold by the RIAJ for sales over 100,000.

== Overview ==
Vamps chose "Love Addict" as the first song because they felt it symbolized the entire album. They tried not to make the song too fast as they wanted people to be able to dance to it, and added an "edgy guitar."

"Time Goes By" was originally created while the two worked on Hyde's 2006 Faith album, but they felt the refrain was not catchy enough. It was only after listening to it again for this single, that K.A.Z came up with a new idea.

The limited edition of the single came with a DVD that includes the music video of the title track and its making of.

"Love Addict" was one of the song's re-recorded for Vamps' 2013 worldwide debut album, Sex Blood Rock n' Roll.

== Track listing ==
All lyrics are written by Hyde

No.	Title	Music	Length
1.	"Love Addict"	Hyde	4:00
2.	"Time Goes By"	Hyde, K.A.Z	4:10
