= Graham Killeen =

American independent filmmaker (born 1980)

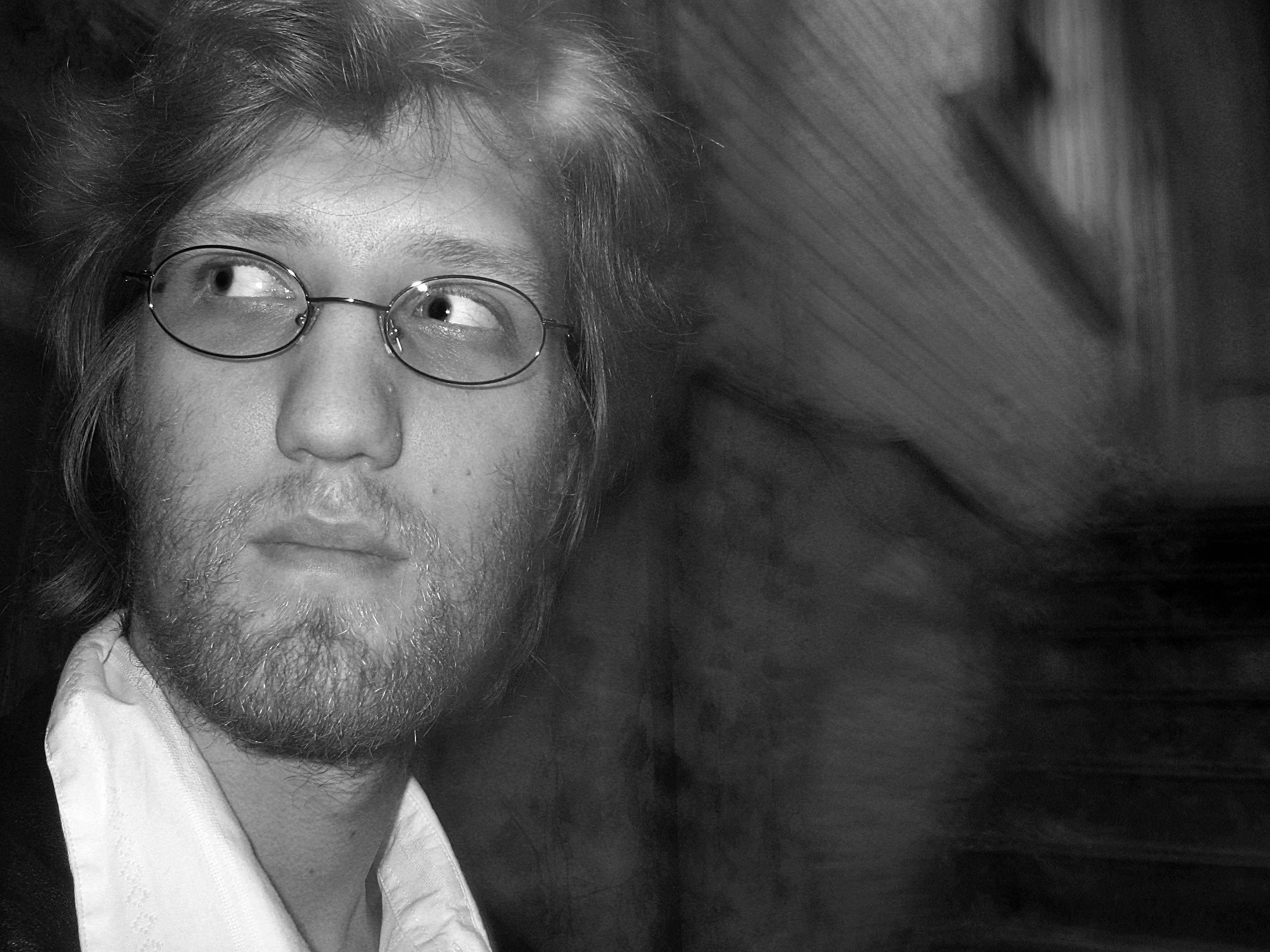
- Writer/Director Graham Killeen
- Born: Graham John Killeen
- Occupations: screenwriter film director film producer actor
- Spouse: Mercedes Hacker
- Awards: 2006 Best Milwaukee Filmmaker
- Website: http://www.signalfirefilms.com/blog/graham.asp

Graham Killeen (born 1980) is an American independent filmmaker. He is best known as the writer-director of Six Bullets, a short film that premiered at the NYC Downtown Film Festival in 2007. He won the Shepherd Express Best of Milwaukee 2006 award for "Best Milwaukee Filmmaker". Currently he is working on a feature-length drama titled Three Fifty-Five for the film company Signal Fire Films.

Killeen was raised in Newburg and West Bend, Wisconsin. He holds a bachelor's degree in Theatre Arts from the University of Wisconsin–Milwaukee, having graduated in 2007. Killeen is a film critic for the Milwaukee Journal-Sentinel.
