= Devil Side =

Single by Vamps

from the album Beast
- Released: May 12, 2010
- Genre: Hard rock
- Label: Vamprose
- Songwriter(s): Hyde
- Producer(s): Vamps

Vamps singles chronology
"Sweet Dreams" (2009)	"Devil Side" (2010)	"Angel Trip" (2010)

"Devil Side" is the fifth single by Vamps, released on May 12, 2010. It includes a cover of the 1982 song "Live Wire" by Mötley Crüe. The limited edition came with a DVD that includes two versions of the music video for the title track.

== Chart performance ==
The single reached number 2 on the Oricon chart.

== Track listing ==
No.	Title	Lyrics	Music	Length
1.	"Devil Side"	Hyde	Hyde	4:23
2.	"Live Wire"	Nikki Sixx	Nikki Sixx	3:16
