= Juhani Lagerspetz =

Finnish pianist

Juhani Henrik Lagerspetz (born 1959 in Turku) is a Finnish pianist trained at the Turku Conservatory and the Sibelius Academy, where he serves as a lecturer. He was prized by the Alfred Kordelin Foundation in 1994.

Lagerspetz may be best known for his recordings for Ondine, including Mikko Heiniö and Jukka Tiensuu's, respectively, Hermes and Mind Piano Concertos. He has also recorded Maurice Ravel's solo piano works for YLE and served as a duo partner to Truls Mørk at a recording of Johannes Brahms's Cello Sonatas for Simax Classics.
