= Bittersweet (Apocalyptica song) =

Single by Apocalyptica featuring Ville Valo and Lauri Ylönen

from the album Apocalyptica
- Released: 29 November 2004
- Genre: Alternative rock Cello rock
- Length: 14:19
- Label: UMG
- Songwriter(s): Eicca Toppinen, Ville Valo, Lauri Ylönen

Apocalyptica singles chronology
"Seemann" (2003)	"Bittersweet" (2004)	"Wie Weit/How Far/En Vie" (2005)

"Bittersweet" is a single by the cello rock band Apocalyptica in collaboration with Ville Valo (of HIM) and Lauri Ylönen (of The Rasmus). The music is by Apocalyptica, the lyrics by Ville Valo and the vocals by Ville Valo and Lauri Ylönen. The song is written for four cellos (quartet) and voice, but there are versions for just the cello quartet. The lyrics are about a love triangle, in which a woman loves a man, who does not love her back, and another man who is in love with the woman, while she does not love him back.

"Bittersweet" was released on 29 November 2004. The song peaked at number 1 on Finnish Singles Chart. It also peaked at number 6 in Germany, number 8 in Switzerland, number 11 In Austria, and number 53 in Sweden.

== Video clip ==
The band produced a video clip for the song "Bittersweet", shot in the band's hometown Helsinki and nationalpark of Torronsuon kansallispuisto and was directed by renowned Finnish director Antti Jokinen, who had previously worked with artists such as Nightwish, Celine Dion, and Shania Twain. The video opens with Ville Valo and Lauri Ylönen sitting at opposite ends of a long table with red candles at each end, using a ouija board as they both sing. Occasional clips of Apocalyptica playing in a misty swamp at what appears to be mid-morning are strewn randomly throughout the video. As the video progresses, the camera follows a woman dressed in black, occasionally flashing back to Valo and Ylönen still singing. The woman runs through the same forest Apocalyptica is playing in. Later, Apocalyptica is shown playing upside down on the ceiling where Valo and Ylönen are sitting with their hair dangling just above them as they (being Valo and Ylönen) continue moving the dial of the ouija board. In the last few seconds of the video, the song ends and the woman is shown laying down to sleep as the moon descends into the horizon. Suddenly the candles at the table blow out, and the video ends with Ylönen and Valo glaring at the camera with wholly black eyes, presumably having been possessed by demons.

== Track listing ==
1. "Bittersweet" (Edit) – 3:23
2. "Bittersweet" (Acoustic version) – 3:21
3. "Bittersweet" (Instrumental version) – 3:22
4. "Misconstruction" – 3:59

== Charts ==
=== Weekly charts ===
Chart (2004–05)	Peak position
Austria (Ö3 Austria Top 40)	11
Finland (Suomen virallinen lista)	1
Germany (GfK)	6
Sweden (Sverigetopplistan)	53
Switzerland (Schweizer Hitparade)	8

=== Year-end charts ===
Chart (2005)	Position
Germany (Official German Charts)	100
Switzerland (Schweizer Hitparade)	72
