= Dolly (French band) =

French rock band

- Origin: Nantes, France
- Genres: Rock, alternative rock
- Years active: 1989–2005
- Labels: WEA International inc., Warner Music Group, East West Records
- Members: Emmanuelle Monet; Thierry (Thierry Lacroix); Nico (Nicolas Bonnière) (1995 - present)
- Past members: Micka (Michaël Chamberlin) († 2005)
- Website: Official site

Dolly is a rock band from Nantes, France. The group is popular in France but less well-known elsewhere. Dolly's vocalist Emmanuelle Monet has appeared in many collaborations, including a song together with Apocalyptica on the single "Wie weit/How far/En Vie". Dolly stopped their activity indefinitely after the death of Michaël Chamberlin in a car accident on 25 May 2005.

== History ==
Dolly was originally formed by Emmanuelle Monet, Thierry Lacroix and Michaël Chamberlin in 1989 under the name of Dollybird. 1991 they changed their name to Dolly & Co and made their debut album which was also named Dolly & Co. The actual Dolly was not born until Nicolas Bonnière joined the band in 1995. The name was then changed to Dolly. Emmanuelle Monet has now reformed her band with a new bassist, under the name of "Manu".

== Members ==
- Manu (Emmanuelle Monet) - vocals, guitar
- Thierry (Thierry Lacroix) - drums
- Nico (Nicolas Bonnière) - Guitar (1995–present)

=== Former members ===
- Micka (Michaël Chamberlin) - bass (1989 - † 2005 at the age of 36 years)

== Discography ==
- Dolly (April 1997) (released in both French and English versions)
- Un jour de rêves (August 1999)
- Sunday Afternoon (2000) (the only English album of the band)
- Plein air (April 2002)
- Tous des stars (2004)

== Sources ==
- RFI music - Dolly biography
- (in French) RFI musique - Dolly biographie
- (in French) Rockmuzik - Dolly biographie (in French)
- (in French) W-Frenc.org - Dolly (in French)
