= Vamps (band) =

Japanese rock duo

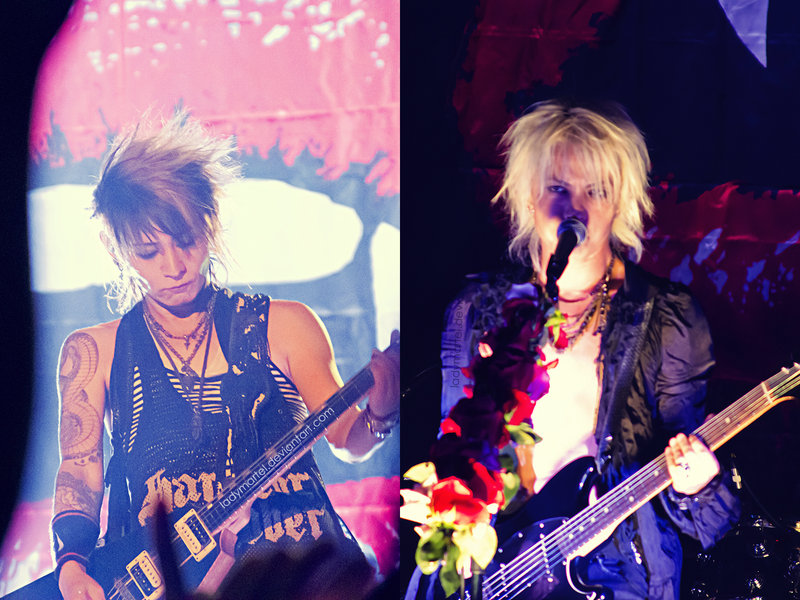
- Vamps in New York City on October 9, 2010; From left: K.A.Z and Hyde

Background information
- Origin: Tokyo, Japan
- Genres: Hard rock; alternative rock
- Years active: 2008–2017 (on hiatus)
- Labels: Vamprose/Avex; Delicious Deli/Universal Music; Sony Music (KR); Gan-Shin (EU); Spinefarm
- Members: Hyde; K.A.Z
- Website: Official site

Vamps is a Japanese rock duo formed in 2008 by Hyde (vocalist, rhythm guitarist, lyricist and composer) and K.A.Z (lead guitarist, backing vocalist and composer). Only a year after their founding, Vamps performed its first international tour, ten dates in the United States, and in 2010 they went on their first world tour. Originally signed to Hyde's own record label Vamprose, every release the band has had to date has reached the top ten on the Oricon music chart. In 2013, the group changed labels to Universal Music Group's Delicious Deli Records and produced their worldwide debut release. After several tours and collaborations with Western acts, Vamps worked with outside producers and songwriters for the first time on the 2017 album Underworld before temporarily ceasing all activities at the end of that year.

== History ==
=== 2008–2011 ===
Vamps was formed by Hyde (L'Arc-en-Ciel) and K.A.Z (Oblivion Dust) in 2008. After working together on Hyde's solo career since 2003, the singer said he came to value K.A.Z's input so much, that he decided to form a band with him instead of using his own name. The name "Vamps" was derived from Hyde's interest in vampires, but he noted that he is also interested in "mysterious women"; referring to how "vamp" is another word for a femme fatale. The band's first material was the single "Love Addict", released on July 2, 2008.

Their first nationwide tour, Vamps Live 2008, kicked off at Zepp Tokyo. The band, having only released one single, played mostly songs from Hyde's solo career. Between August 1 and October 28, they played 46 shows at the Zepp live houses throughout Japan. The band played 6 to 10 shows at each venue and every single show was sold out. Vamps' second single "I Gotta Kick Start Now" was released on March 13, 2009, and was followed by "Evanescent" on May 13.

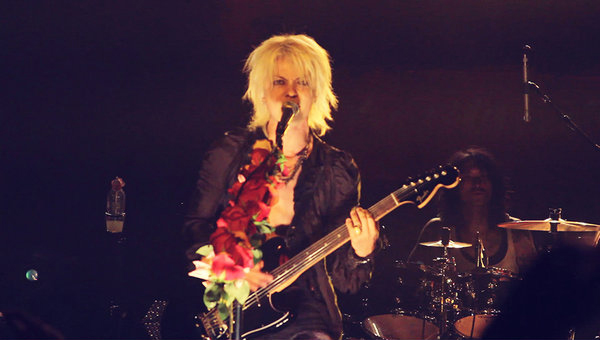
Hyde performing with Vamps in New York City, October 9, 2010

In July 2009, Vamps went on their Vamps Live 2009 U.S.A. Tour. The tour covered 10 cities in the United States from July 11 - August 1. Stopping in the following cities: New York, two Warped Tour 2009 shows (Hartford & Columbia), Baltimore, Seattle, Portland, San Francisco, Las Vegas, San Diego, and finishing off in Los Angeles. They had an additional finale US show in Pearl Harbor, Oahu, Hawaii on board the battleship USS Missouri on September 19. On June 10, 2009, they released their self-titled debut album, Vamps, followed by their fourth single "Sweet Dreams" on September 30.

On January 31, 2010, the band was awarded the Billboard Japan Music Awards Rising International Artist award for their efforts and success with their tour in the US. After releasing the DVD of their US tour on March 17, they released the single "Devil Side" on May 12. Their sixth single "Angel Trip" was released on June 9, followed by their second album, Beast, on July 28, 2010. The band held a free concert in Roppongi Hills on July 30, which was also freely streamed live on several websites.

Vamps embarked on their first world tour in the fall of 2010. Making stops in the following countries: Taiwan, United States, Spain, France, China and Chile. Their seventh single "Memories" was released on December 15, 2010, and contains the B-side "Get Up -Japanese Ver.-", which is an alternative version of "Get Up" that translates some of the English lyrics into Japanese. This recording of the song was used in the Bakuman. anime, which features a fictionalized version of Hyde that is voiced by the singer himself. On July 13, 2011, Vamps released their fourth DVD, Vamps Live 2010 World Tour Chile, which was recorded in Santiago on November 6, 2010, at the Caupolican Theatre.

=== 2013–2017 ===
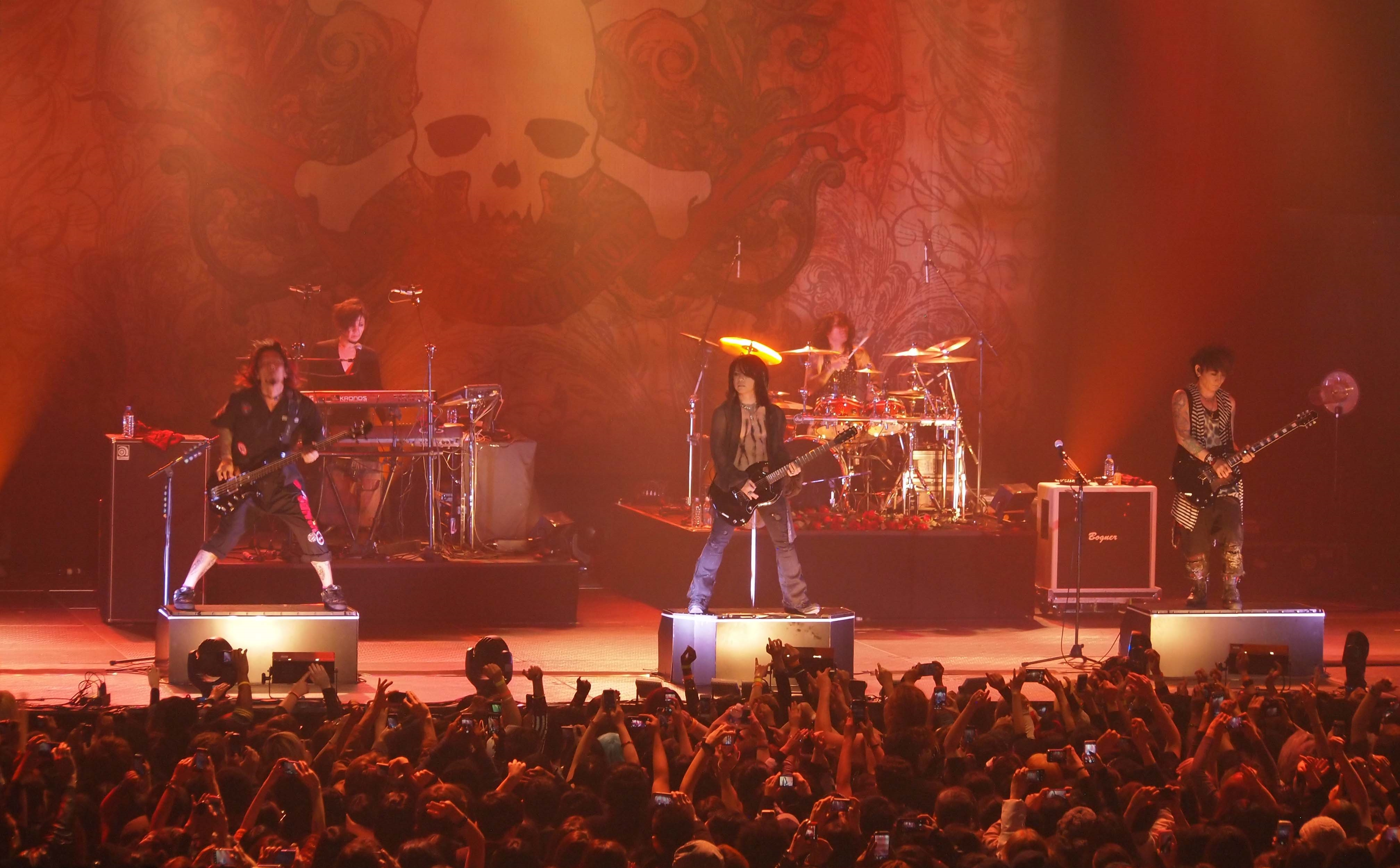
Vamps at the Roseland Ballroom on December 8, 2013.

In February 2013, Vamps announced they were changing record labels to Universal Music Group's Delicious Deli Records. The first release on the label was the home video Vamps Live 2012 on April 24, which was recorded at Zepp Namba in 2012. Vamps, who were recording in Los Angeles, performed at the 2013 MTV Video Music Awards Japan on June 22, coming straight from the airport. This was the first performance of the songs from their double A-side single "Ahead/Replay", which was released on July 3, exactly one year and one day since their debut five years ago. The duo released the best-of album Sex Blood Rock n' Roll on September 25, which includes re-recordings of songs, all in English, and is also their first worldwide release. They supported the record with a world tour that took them to Barcelona, Paris, Berlin, London, and finished with shows in Los Angeles and New York where they were supported by Sid Wilson of Slipknot.

Vamps headlined the U-Express Live 2014 event at the Saitama Super Arena on March 1, played their second show in London on March 28 and also performed at that year's Download Festival on June 14. Two singles "Get Away/The Jolly Roger" and "Vampire's Love" were released on August 20 and October 8 respectively, with the latter being used for the Japanese release of the American film Dracula Untold. The band then produced their third studio album BloodSuckers on October 29, 2014. It was released in Europe on March 23, 2015, and in the US a day later.

Vamps hosted the VampPark Fest at the Nippon Budokan on February 18 and 19, 2015. In addition to themselves, it included Sixx:A.M., Buckcherry, Sads, Nothing More, Gerard Way and Alexandros. Vamps took part in the Japan Night event held in Jakarta on April 4, alongside several other artists promoting Japanese music. Beginning on April 8, they were a support act for twelve stops on Sixx:A.M.'s North American tour. They also performed at two festivals in Florida, the Fort Rock Festival on April 25 and Welcome to Rockville the following day, their own headlining show at the Best Buy Theater on May 1, and at the Rock on the Range festival on May 15. Vamps returned to South America for four concerts in late September and early October, before being a support act for six shows on Apocalyptica's UK tour in November. They released a collaborative single with Apocalyptica titled "Sin in Justice" on November 20.

The single "Inside of Me" produced by Howard Benson and featuring Chris Motionless was released on August 31, 2016. Its B-side, "Rise or Die", features Richard Z. Kruspe. The music video for "Calling" was released via Loudwire in April 2017. These three tracks and "Sin in Justice" were included on the album Underworld, released on April 26, 2017. Designed to appeal to American audiences, it marks the first time Vamps brought in a producer and co-writers on songs. In September, they opened for Danzig at three concerts in the Western US and headlined their own show at the Roxie Theater.

On December 1, 2017, Vamps announced that they were temporarily ceasing all activities; "Our engines have overheated and we need some time to cool down. As soon as we are at our best temperature and the time is right for our return, we plan to kick back into action in top gear!"

== Members ==
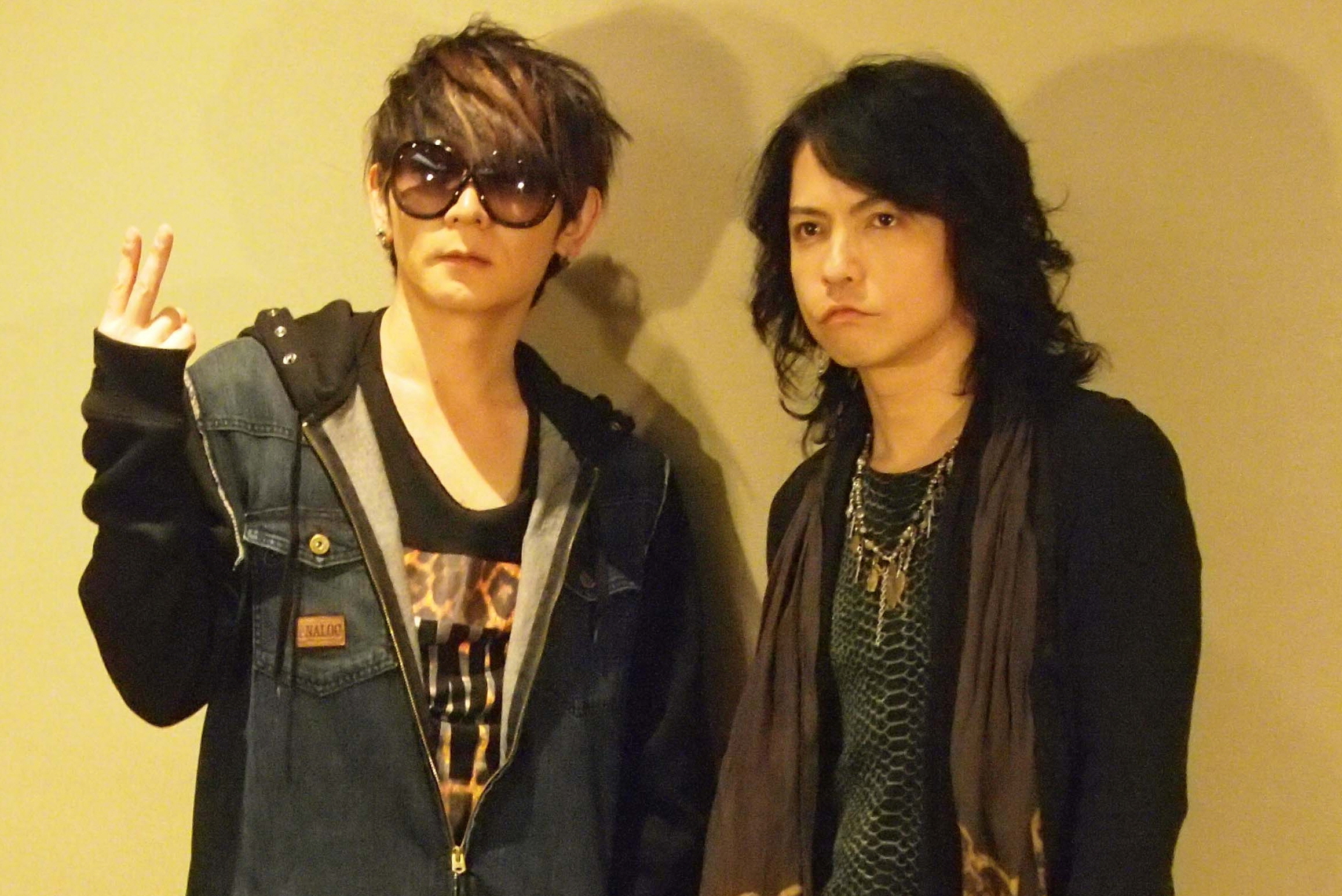
Vamps at a press conference in New York in 2013

- Hyde – vocals, rhythm guitar
- K.A.Z – lead guitar, backing vocals
- Ju-ken – support bass, backing vocals
- Arimatsu – support drums
- Jin – support keyboards, backing vocals

== Discography ==
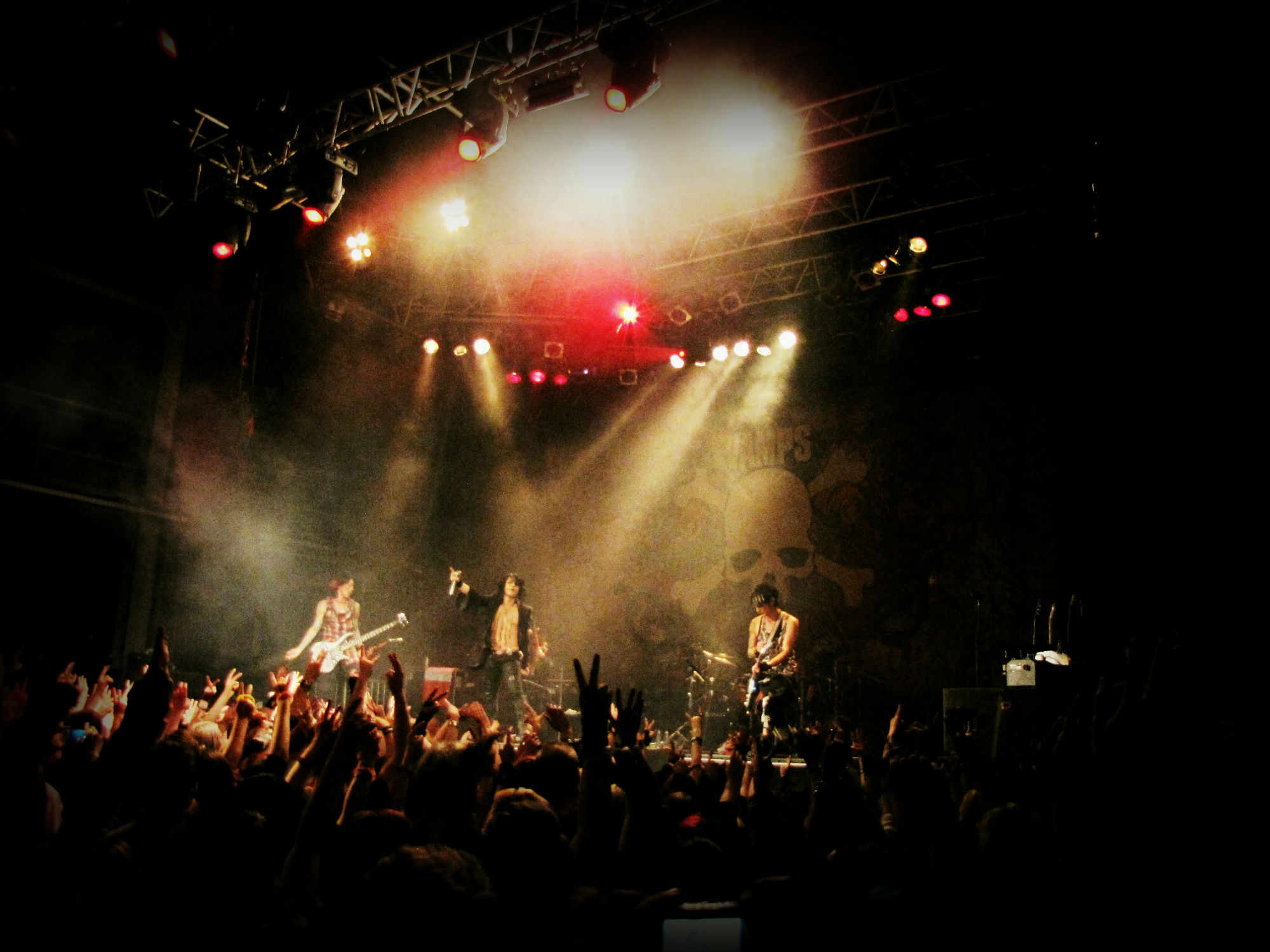
Vamps performing in Berlin on October 3, 2013.

=== Studio albums ===
- Vamps (June 10, 2009) Oricon Albums Chart Peak Position: No. 3
- Beast (July 28, 2010) No. 3
- Bloodsuckers (October 29, 2014) No. 5
- Underworld (April 26, 2017) No. 2

=== Compilation albums ===
- Sex Blood Rock n' Roll (September 25, 2013) No. 2
- Complete Box -Gold Disc Edition- (November 28, 2018, box set)

=== Singles ===
- "Love Addict" (July 2, 2008) Oricon Singles Chart Peak Position: No. 2
- "I Gotta Kick Start Now" (March 13, 2009) No. 6
- "Evanescent" (May 13, 2009) No. 4
- "Sweet Dreams" (September 30, 2009) No. 2
- "Devil Side" (May 12, 2010) No. 2
- "Angel Trip" (June 9, 2010) No. 4
- "Memories" (December 15, 2010) No. 4
- "Ahead/Replay" (stylized as ⒶHEAD／REPLAY, July 3, 2013) No. 3
- "Get Away/The Jolly Roger" (August 20, 2014) No. 3
- "Vampire's Love" (October 8, 2014) No. 3
- "Sin in Justice" with Apocalyptica (November 20, 2015)
- "Inside of Me" featuring Chris Motionless of Motionless in White (August 31, 2016) No. 7
- "Calling" (March 22, 2017) No. 8

=== DVDs ===
- Vamps Live 2008 (February 4, 2009) Oricon DVDs Chart Peak Position: No. 2
- Vamps Live 2009 U.S.A. (March 17, 2010) No. 4
- Vamps Live 2009 (May 12, 2010) No. 2
- Vamps Live 2010 World Tour Chile (July 13, 2011) No. 2
- Vamps Live 2010 Beauty and the Beast Arena (February 15, 2012) No. 4
- Vamps Live 2012 (April 24, 2013) No. 7 Oricon Blu-rays Chart Peak Position: No. 10
- Vamps Live 2014 London (June 25, 2014) No. 8 No. 9
- Vamps Live 2014-2015 (June 24, 2015) No. 7 No. 6
- Vamps Live 2015 BloodSuckers (December 9, 2015) No. 2 No. 5
- MTV Unplugged: Vamps (June 29, 2016) No. 6 No. 6
- Vamps History: The Complete Video Collection 2008-2014 (December 14, 2016) No. 16 No. 6
- Vamps Live 2017 Underworld (December 6, 2017) No. 13 No. 10

== Awards ==
- 2009 Billboard Japan Music Awards, Rising International Artist — Vamps
- 2015 MTV Video Music Awards Japan, Best Rock Artist — Vamps
