= Kaz (musician) =

K.A.Z
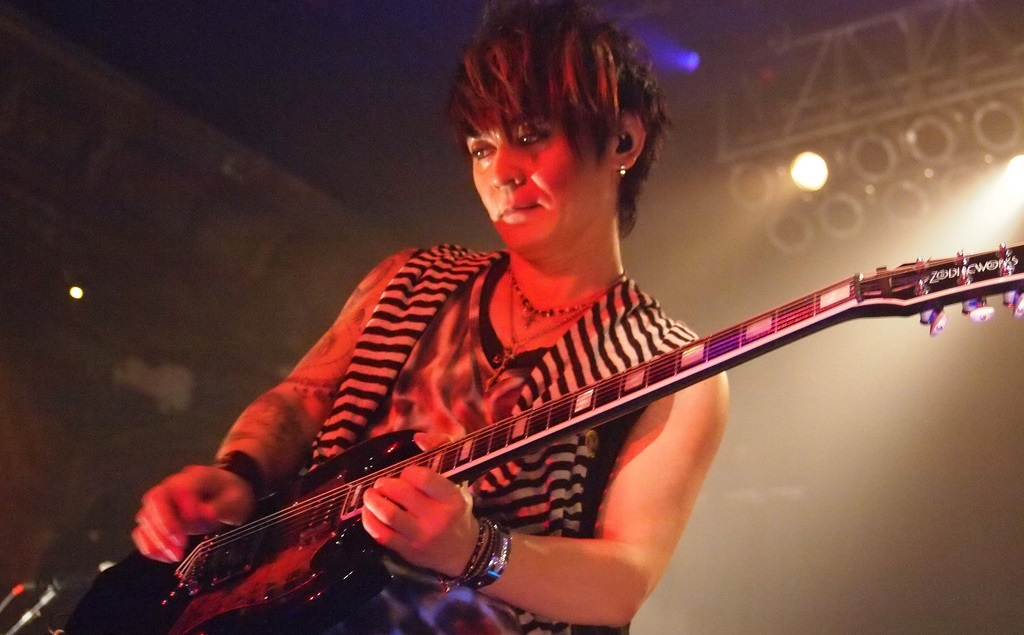
- K.A.Z with Vamps in New York City, 2013

Background information
- Also known as: KAZ
- Born: Kazuhito Iwaike (岩池 一仁); October 11, 1968 (age 57); Yamanashi Prefecture, Japan
- Genres: Alternative rock; hard rock; post-grunge
- Occupations: Musician; guitarist; songwriter
- Instrument: Guitar
- Years active: 1987–present
- Member of: Oblivion Dust; Vamps
- Formerly of: hide with Spread Beaver; Spin Aqua
- Website: www.kaz1011.com

Kazuhito Iwaike (Japanese: 岩池 一仁, Hepburn: Iwaike Kazuhito; born on October 11, 1968), known exclusively by his stage name K.A.Z, is a Japanese musician and songwriter. He is known for his work with Oblivion Dust, hide with Spread Beaver and Vamps.

== Career ==
K.A.Z originally wanted to be a drummer, but drums were too expensive. He found a guitar in his sister's room and began to play with it when she was out.

K.A.Z was first guitarist of the bands Gemmy Rockets and The Lovers, before forming Oblivion Dust in 1996. In January 1998, he joined hide's backing band, Spread Beaver. However this did not last long due to hide's death on May 2, with K.A.Z only appearing on two songs on his final album Ja, Zoo, released at the end of the year. Although, Spread Beaver did go through with the 1998 tour, with K.A.Z joining them. He and his Spread Beaver bandmates I.N.A. and D.I.E. remixed a song for Zilch's Bastard Eyes in 1999. K.A.Z also appears on hide with Spread Beaver's 2000 version of "Tell Me" and has played with them each time they reunited; 2008, 2016, 2018, and 2023. K.A.Z is portrayed by Masato Kataoka in the 2022 film Tell Me: hide to Mita Keshiki (TELL ME ～hideと見た景色～), which shows how Ja, Zoo was completed following hide's death.

In 2001, the year Oblivion Dust disbanded, he co-arranged the song "Tightrope" on the debut double A-side single of L'Arc-en-Ciel bassist Tetsu.

In 2002, K.A.Z formed the short-lived rock unit Spin Aqua with singer, actress, and former model Anna Tsuchiya. After producing three singles and one album, they dispersed in mid-2004.

He started to work with L'Arc-en-Ciel vocalist Hyde in 2003, co-arranging all the songs on 666. He co-arranged and co-produced Hyde's third solo album Faith, and composed five of the songs, including the single "Season's Call". He also served as support guitarist on Hyde's tours.

In late 2004, K.A.Z created the band Sonic Storage with his former Spread Beaver bandmate I.N.A. He also participated in, influential Korean musician, Seo Taiji's album 7th Issue.

On June 28, 2007, it was announced that Oblivion Dust would reunite, and in early 2008 K.A.Z and Hyde formed Vamps.

K.A.Z is also a composer for films, including Detroit Metal City (2008) for which he wrote the main track "Satsugai".

== Equipment ==
K.A.Z had a range of signature guitars:

- ESP VP-K350
- ESP KZ.V-ONE-W
- ESP KZ.P-ONE-W&Fire
- ESP Potbelly K.A.Z Custom
- ESP K.A.Z Model
- ESP TE-K300
- ESP SG Type
- PRS with P-90'
- Dean Markley Strings
