= List of songs recorded by L'Arc-en-Ciel =

This is a comprehensive list of songs recorded by Japanese alternative rock band L'Arc-en-Ciel. Since the band formed in 1991, it has released twelve studio albums.

== Table ==
Key
†	Indicates single release

Title	Year	Album / Single	Songwriter(s)	Notes
"A Silent Letter"	2000	Real	ken	
"A Swell in the Sun"	1998	"Snow Drop"	yukihiro	Single B-side
"All Year Around Falling in Love"	2000	Real	hyde	
"Alone en la Vida"	2007	Kiss	ken	
"Anata"	1998	Heart	tetsuya	
"Anata no tame ni"	1995	"Natsu no Yuu-utsu (Time to Say Good-bye)"	ken	Single B-side
"And She Said"	1995	Heavenly	hyde	
"As if in a Dream"	1993	Dune	ken	
"As One"	2005	Awake	hyde	
"All Dead"	1994	Tierra	hyde	
"Be Destined"	1993	Dune	ken	
"Blame"	1994	Tierra	tetsuya	
"Birth!"	1998	Heart	hyde	
"Bless" †	2010	Butterfly	hyde	
"Blurry Eyes" †	1994	Tierra	tetsuya	DNA²'s opening theme
"Bravery"	2000	Real	tetsuya	
"Brilliant Years"	1995	"Vivid Colors"	hyde	Single B-side
"Butterfly's Sleep"	1999	Ark	ken	
"Bye Bye"	2012	Butterfly	tetsuya	
"C'est la Vie"	1995	Heavenly	tetsuya	
"Caress of Venus"	1996	True	ken	
"Chase" †	2011	Butterfly	hyde, ken	
"Coming Closer"	2004	Smile	ken	
"Cradle"	1999	Ark	yukihiro	
"Cureless"	1995	Heavenly	tetsuya	
"Daybreak's Bell" †	2006	Kiss	ken	Mobile Suit Gundam 00's first opening theme
"Dearest Love"	1996	True	tetsuya	
"Dive to Blue" †	1998	Ark	tetsuya	Re-released on 30 August 2006
"Drink It Down" †	2008	Butterfly	yukihiro	
"Driver's High" †	1999	Ark	tetsuya	Great Teacher Onizuka's first opening theme
"Dune"	1993	Dune	tetsuya	
"Eien"	2004	Smile	hyde	
"Entichers"	1993	Dune	hyde	
"Existence"	2005	Awake	ken	
"Farewell"	1996	True	ken	
"Fate"	1998	Heart	ken	
"Feeling Fine"	2004	Smile	ken	
"Finale"	2000	Real	tetsuya	
"Floods of Tears" †	1992	Dune	tetsuya	
"Flower" †	1996	True	hyde	
"Forbidden Lover" †	1998	Ark	ken	
"Forever" †	2021		tetsuya	
"Garasu Dama"	1995	Heavenly	ken	
"Get out from the Shell"	2000	"Stay Away"	yukihiro	Single B-side
"Get out from the Shell -Asian Version-"	2000	Real	yukihiro	
"Good Luck My Way" †	2011	Butterfly	tetsuya	
"Good Morning Hide"	1996	True	hyde	
"Heaven's Drive" †	1999	Ark	hyde	
"Hitomi ni Utsuru Mono"	1994	Tierra	ken	
"Hitomi no Juunin" †	2004	Smile	tetsuya	
"Honey" †	1998	Ray	hyde	
"Hoshizora"	2005	Awake	hyde	
"Hurry Xmas" †	2007	Kiss	hyde	
"I'm so Happy"	1996	"Kaze ni Kienaide"	hyde	Single B-side
"I Wish"	1996	True	tetsuya	
"Ibara no Namida"	1999	Ray	hyde	
"In the Air"	1994	Tierra	hyde	
"Inner Core"	1994	Tierra	sakura	
"It's the End"	1999	Ray	ken	
"Jiyuu e no Shoutai" †	2004	Awake	tetsuya	
"Jojoushi" †	2005	Awake	ken	
"Kasou" †	1998	Ray	ken	
"Kaze ni Kienaide" †	1996	True	tetsuya	
"Kaze no Yukue"	1994	Tierra	ken	
"Killing Me" †	2005	Awake	hyde	
"Kuchizuke"	2004	Smile	ken	
"L'heure"	1999	Ray	yukihiro	
"Larva"	1999	Ark	yukihiro	
"Lies and Truth" †	1996	True	ken	
"Link" †	2005	Kiss	tetsuya	
"Loreley"	1998	Heart	hyde	
"Lost Heaven"	2005	Awake	ken	Ending theme of the film Fullmetal Alchemist the Movie: Conqueror of Shamballa
"Love Flies" †	1999	Real	ken	
"Lover Boy"	2004	Smile	ken	
"Metropolis"	1998	"Winter Fall"	ken	Single B-side
"Milky Way"	1998	Heart	tetsuya	
"Mirai Sekai"	2012	Butterfly	ken	
"My Dear"	2005	Awake	hyde	
"My Heart Draws a Dream" †	2007	Kiss	ken	
"Natsu no Yuu-utsu"	1995	Heavenly	ken	
"Natsu no Yuu-utsu (Time to Say Good-bye)" †	1995	The Best of L'Arc-en-Ciel 1994-1998	ken	
"Nemuri ni Yosete"	1994	Tierra	ken	
"New World" †	2005	Awake	hyde, yukihiro	
"Nexus 4" †	2008	Butterfly	tetsuya	
"Neo Universe" †	2000	Real	ken	
"Niji" †	1997	Heart	ken	
"Ophelia"	2005	Awake	hyde	
"Peeping Tom"	1998	"Dive to Blue"	hyde	Single B-side
"Perfect Blue"	1999	Ark	tetsuya	
"Pieces" †	1999	Ark	tetsuya	
"Pretty Girl"	2007	Kiss	ken	
"Promised Land"	1998	Heart	ken	
"Ready Steady Go" †	2004	Smile	tetsuya	Fullmetal Alchemist's second opening theme
"Revelation"	2004	Smile	yukihiro	
"Round and Round"	1996	True	hyde	
"Route 666"	2000	Real	hyde	
"Sai wa Nagerareta"	1997	"Lies and Truth"	ken	Single B-side
"Sayonara"	1996	"Flower"	hyde	Single B-side
"Secret Signs"	1995	Heavenly	ken	
"Sell my Soul"	1999	Ray	hyde	
"Seventh Heaven" †	2007	Kiss	hyde	
"Shade of Season"	2012	Butterfly	yukihiro	
"Shi no Hai"	1999	Ray	tetsuya	
"Shinshoku (Lose Control)" †	1998	Ray	ken	Included in the soundtrack of the film Godzilla
"Shine"	2008	Butterfly	tetsuya	
"Shinjitsu to Gensou to"	1999	Ark	ken	
"Shizuka no Umi de"	1995	Heavenly	L'Arc~en~Ciel	
"Shout at the Devil"	1998	Heart	ken	
"Shutting from the Sky"	1993	Dune	L'Arc~en~Ciel	
"Singin' in the Rain"	1998	Heart	hyde	
"Snow Drop" †	1998	Ray	tetsuya	Re-released on 30 August 2006
"Spiral"	2007	Kiss	yukihiro	
"Spirit Dreams Inside"	2001	"Spirit Dreams Inside (Another Dream)"	hyde	Single B-side
"Spirit Dreams Inside (Another Dream)" †	2001	Smile	hyde	Included in the soundtrack of the film Final Fantasy: Spirits Within
"Stay Away" †	2000	Real	tetsuya	
"Still I'm With You"	1995	Heavenly	ken	
"Sunadokei"	2007	Kiss	tetsuya	
"Taste of Love"	1993	Dune	ken	
"The Black Rose"	2007	Kiss	hyde	
"The Fourth Avenue Cafe" †	1996	True	ken	Released on 30 August 2006, Rurouni Kenshin's fourth ending theme
"The Ghost in My Room"	1997	"Niji"	hyde	Single B-side
"The Nepenthes"	2000	Real	ken	
"The Rain Leaves a Scar"	1995	Heavenly	ken	
"The Silver Shining"	1999	Ray	ken	
"Time Goes On"	2004	Smile	tetsuya	
"Time Slip"	2000	Real	ken	
"Trick"	1999	Ray	yukihiro	
"Trust"	2005	Awake	tetsuya	
"Tsuioku no Joukei"	1993	Dune	L'Arc~en~Ciel	
"Twinkle, Twinkle"	2005	Awake	ken	
"Umibe"	2007	Kiss	tetsuya	
"Ushinawareta Nagame"	1993	Dune	ken	
"Vivid Colors" †	1995	Heavenly	ken	
"Voice"	1993	Dune	ken	
"What is Love"	1999	Ark	tetsuya	
"Wild Flower"	2012	Butterfly	ken	
"Wind of Gold"	1994	Tierra	ken	
"Winter Fall" †	1998	Heart	ken	
"White Feathers"	1994	Tierra	ken	
"XXX" †	2011	Butterfly	hyde	
"Yasouka"	1992	Dune	ken	Single B-Side, recorded in 1992 anniversary edition only
"Yokan"	1993	Dune	ken	Recorded in 1993 anniversary edition only
"Yuki no Ashiato"	2007	Kiss	ken	
