= The Best of L'Arc-en-Ciel C/W =

The Best of L'Arc-en-Ciel c/w

Compilation album by L'Arc-en-Ciel
- Released: March 19, 2003
- Genre: Alternative rock, pop rock
- Label: Ki/oon

L'Arc-en-Ciel chronology
| The Best of L'Arc-en-Ciel 1998–2000 (2003) | The Best of L'Arc-en-Ciel c/w (2003) | Smile (2004) |

The Best of L'Arc-en-Ciel C/W is a compilation album released by L'Arc-en-Ciel on March 19, 2003, simultaneously with The Best of L'Arc-en-Ciel 1994–1998 and The Best of L'Arc-en-Ciel 1998–2000. It collects previously released B-sides. The album reached number eight on the Oricon Albums Chart and charted for nine weeks.

== Track listing ==
Track listing for The Best of L'Arc-en-Ciel C/W
| # | Title | Length | Lyrics | Music |
|---|---|---|---|---|
| 1 | "Brilliant Years" | 3:16 | Hyde | Hyde |
| 2 | "Anata no Tame ni" (あなたのために, For You) | 4:33 | Hyde | Ken |
| 3 | "I'm So Happy" | 4:43 | Hyde | Hyde |
| 4 | "Sayōnara" (さようなら, Good-bye) | 4:28 | Hyde | Hyde |
| 5 | "Sai wa Nagerareta" (賽は投げられた, The Die was Cast) | 4:09 | Hyde | Ken |
| 6 | "The Ghost in My Room" | 5:00 | Hyde | Hyde |
| 7 | "Metropolis" | 4:22 | Hyde | Ken |
| 8 | "Peeping Tom" | 4:01 | Hyde | Hyde |
| 9 | "A Swell in the Sun" | 4:42 | Hyde | Yukihiro |
| 10 | "Kasou (1014 mix)" (花葬, Flower Burial) | 5:05 | Hyde | Ken* |
| 11 | "hole" | 1:08 | ‐ | Yukihiro |
| 12 | "Get Out from the Shell" | 4:14 | Hyde | Yukihiro |

* Remix by Yukihiro.

== Credits ==
- Hyde – vocals
- Ken – guitar
- Tetsu – bass guitar, backing vocals
- Sakura/Yukihiro – drums

== Charts ==
Weekly chart performance for The Best of L'Arc-en-Ciel C/W
| Chart (2003) | Peak position |
|---|---|
| Japanese Albums (Oricon) | 8 |

== Certifications ==
Certifications for The Best of L'Arc-en-Ciel C/W
| Region | Certification | Certified units/sales |
|---|---|---|
| Japan (RIAJ) | Gold | 100,000^{^} |
^{^} Shipments figures based on certification alone.
