= The Best of L'Arc-en-Ciel 1994–1998 =

Greatest hits album by L'Arc-en-Ciel
- Released: March 19, 2003
- Genre: Alternative rock, pop rock
- Label: Ki/oon

L'Arc-en-Ciel chronology
Clicked Singles Best 13 (2001)	The Best of L'Arc-en-Ciel; 1994–1998 (2003)	The Best of L'Arc-en-Ciel 1998–2000 (2003)

The Best of L'Arc-en-Ciel 1994–1998 is a compilation album released by L'Arc-en-Ciel on March 19, 2003, simultaneously with The Best of L'Arc-en-Ciel 1998–2000 and The Best of L'Arc-en-Ciel C/W. It reached number six on the Oricon Albums Chart and charted for 13 weeks.

== Track listing ==
All lyrics by Hyde.

Track listing for The Best of L'Arc-en-Ciel 1994–1998
#	Title	Music
1	"In the Air"	Hyde
2	"Blurry Eyes"	Tetsu
3	"Vivid Colors"	Ken
4	"and She Said"	Hyde
5	"Natsu no Yuu-utsu [Time to Say Good-bye]" (夏の憂鬱 [time to say good-bye], Summer's Depression)	Ken
6	"Kaze ni Kienaide" (風にきえないで, Don't Vanish in the Wind)	Tetsu
7	"flower"	Hyde
8	"Lies and Truth"	Ken
9	"Caress of Venus"	Ken
10	"the Fourth Avenue Cafe"	Ken
11	"Niji" (虹, Rainbow)	Ken
12	"winter fall"	Ken
13	"Shout at the Devil"	Ken
14	"fate"	Ken
15	"Anata" (あなた, You)	Tetsu

== Credits ==
- Hyde – vocals
- Ken – guitar, keyboards (on some tracks)
- Tetsu – bass guitar, backing vocals, keyboards (on some tracks)
- Sakura/Yukihiro – drums

== Charts ==
Weekly chart performance for The Best of L'Arc-en-Ciel 1994–1998
Chart (2003)	Peak position
Japanese Albums (Oricon)	6

== Certifications ==
Certifications for The Best of L'Arc-en-Ciel 1994–1998
Region	Certification	Certified units/sales
Japan (RIAJ)	Gold	100,000^{^}
^{^} Shipments figures based on certification alone.
