= Neo Universe/Finale =

"Neo Universe / Finale"

Single by L'Arc-en-Ciel

from the album Real
- A-side: "Neo Universe" "Finale" (double A-side)
- B-side: "hole" "Trick - (New Wave of Japanese Heavy Metal Mix)"
- Released: January 19, 2000
- Genre: Alternative rock, Hard rock, progressive rock, Electropop, Grunge
- Length: 16:32
- Label: Ki/oon Records
- Songwriters: Hyde, Ken, Tetsu, Yukihiro
- Producers: L'Arc-en-Ciel, Hajime Okano

L'Arc-en-Ciel singles chronology
"Love Flies" (1999)	"Neo Universe / Finale" (2000)	"Stay Away" (2000)

Music videos
- "Neo Universe" on YouTube
- "Finale" on YouTube

"Neo Universe/Finale" is the twentieth single by L'Arc-en-Ciel. this Double A-side single was released on January 19, 2000, as the second single from the band's eighth studio album, Real (2000). It debuted at number 1 on the Oricon chart and sold 1,103,880 copies, as certified by the RIAJ. "Finale" was used as the theme song of Ringu 0: Birthday. The third track is an instrumental song called "hole" which also featured in Ringu 0 during the opening sequence, and the fourth is a remix version of the song "Trick" from the band's seventh studio album Ray.

== Background ==
This is the band's first single in about 3 months since the band's previous work "Love Flies". This is the band's first double A-side single since their major debut in 1994, and their second in total, including the band's indie releases. It is also the only single that includes songs written or composed by each of the four members. the inclusion of "Finale" and "hole" in Ringu 0 also the first music collaboration between Sony Music Entertainment Japan (SMEJ) and Kadokawa Shoten Publishing, for almost 7 years since the release of the soundtrack of Rex: A Dinosaur's Story on July 1, 1993.

== Writing and composition ==
=== Neo Universe ===
The first A-side song of this work, "NEO UNIVERSE", is a song with strong electro-pop elements that uses a lot of input, and is finished as a bright pop song, which is unusual for a work composed by Ken at this time. In an interview from Ultra Veat Magazine about the band's 1999 albums "Ark" and "Ray", Ken said, "As soon as I felt like people around me wanted me to write overly upbeat songs, I just couldn't write any more", and says that he consciously wrote a bright song in this production. In an interview from WHAT's IN? Magazine at the time of the release of this singles, Ken revealed that he was decide to "write a cheerful song" and Make a song that starts with a major chord." As the world enter a new millennium in the year 2000, Hyde says, "The lyrics express the "Reality" and "Dreams" of the future."

=== Finale ===
The second A-side song, "Finale", is a melodious fusion of Hard-Power Ballad and Grunge that incorporates Trip hop unique dark sound and gives off a dark and fleeting impression. The lyrics of "Finale" was written in response to a request by Kadokawa to provide the music for "Ringu 0", but the original version of the song was said to have been in stock for about two years before the release of the film. Regarding the reason why this song's prototype was presented to the film production team as a candidate song for the theme song, the composer, Tetsuya, said, "I think it would be a good fit because the next song will be a love story of Sadako Yamamura.". As a side note, Tetsuya had watched all of the Ring series of movies released before the release of "Ringu 0". The band's was previously attempted to record this song once when they was working on the fifth studio album "HEART" which released two year prior, but Tetsuya wasn't satisfied with the previous arrangement and it ended halfway., and the song structure and arrangement was massively overhaul when providing it as the official theme song of "Ringu 0". Also, before starting full-scale recording, Tetsuya decided on the direction of the arrangement by dubbing the keyboard and other sounds by himself. The arrangement of "Finale" was mainly influenced by the Trip hop's unique dark sound, and Tetsuya has claim that the sound and arrangement of "Finale" was on par with "Portishead." Perhaps with this in mind, the arrangement of this song incorporates the noise of a record stylus, and the vocals use a lot of effects to create a processed sound. in addition to Ryo Yoshimata and the band's co-producer Hajime Okano, Ken and Tetsuya also participated in the string arrangement work. The song time is 6 minutes and 28 seconds, making it the longest-running A-side single song of the band's. The lyrics of "Finale" was completely written in Japanese. Hyde, who was in charge of writing the lyrics, looked back on the songwriting process and said, "Even if I approached it completely differently from the movie, it would still feel like I was waking up from a dream, and on the other hand, if it was exactly the same, I felt like there wouldn't be any synergy with the movie."

=== hole ===
The first B-side song, "hole", is an ambient song with an impressive ominous sound. It is an instrumental that yukihiro created before he joined the band's, and the sound source was said to have existed for around 7 to 8 years before the release of this single. After Kadokawa Shoten chosen "Finale" to be the official theme song for the "Ringu 0", Kadokawa requested that the band's also do the insert song, which led to this song being used as the insert song for the movie, before it was decided that it would be recorded as a The B-side song for this single. Regarding this song, Yukihiro said, "It was a song I made when I was playing around with various combinations of sampled things ", adding, "In addition to this song, there are many other versions, including one with bass." ultimately, the song used in the movie is, according to Yukihiro, "a version made mainly of orchestral sampling." The arrangement of this song was done by Yukihiro independently. The song time is 1 minute and 8 seconds, making it the shortest song of all the sound sources released by the band's to date.

=== Trick -new wave of Japanese heavy metal mix ===
The second B-side song, "Trick -new wave of Japanese heavy metal mix", is a remix version of the song "Trick" from the band's seventh studio album "Ray". Regarding how he chose "trick" for the remix, Yukihiro said, "I originally had a guitar riff that I made from a sample, and I was wondering if there was a song I could use for it, and then I got hooked." Regarding the remix process, Yukihiro said, "There were many types of kick sounds, and it was difficult to figure out which one should be played." The subtitle of this song is taken from NWOBHM, a nationwide musical movement that started in England in the mid-1970s and achieved international attention by the early 1980s. Regarding the reason for choosing this word as a subtitle, Yukihiro said, "I thought it would be a cool word for this mix."

Neo Universe, a Japanese Thoroughbred racehorse and sire, is named after the L'Arc-en-Ciel single.

== Music video ==
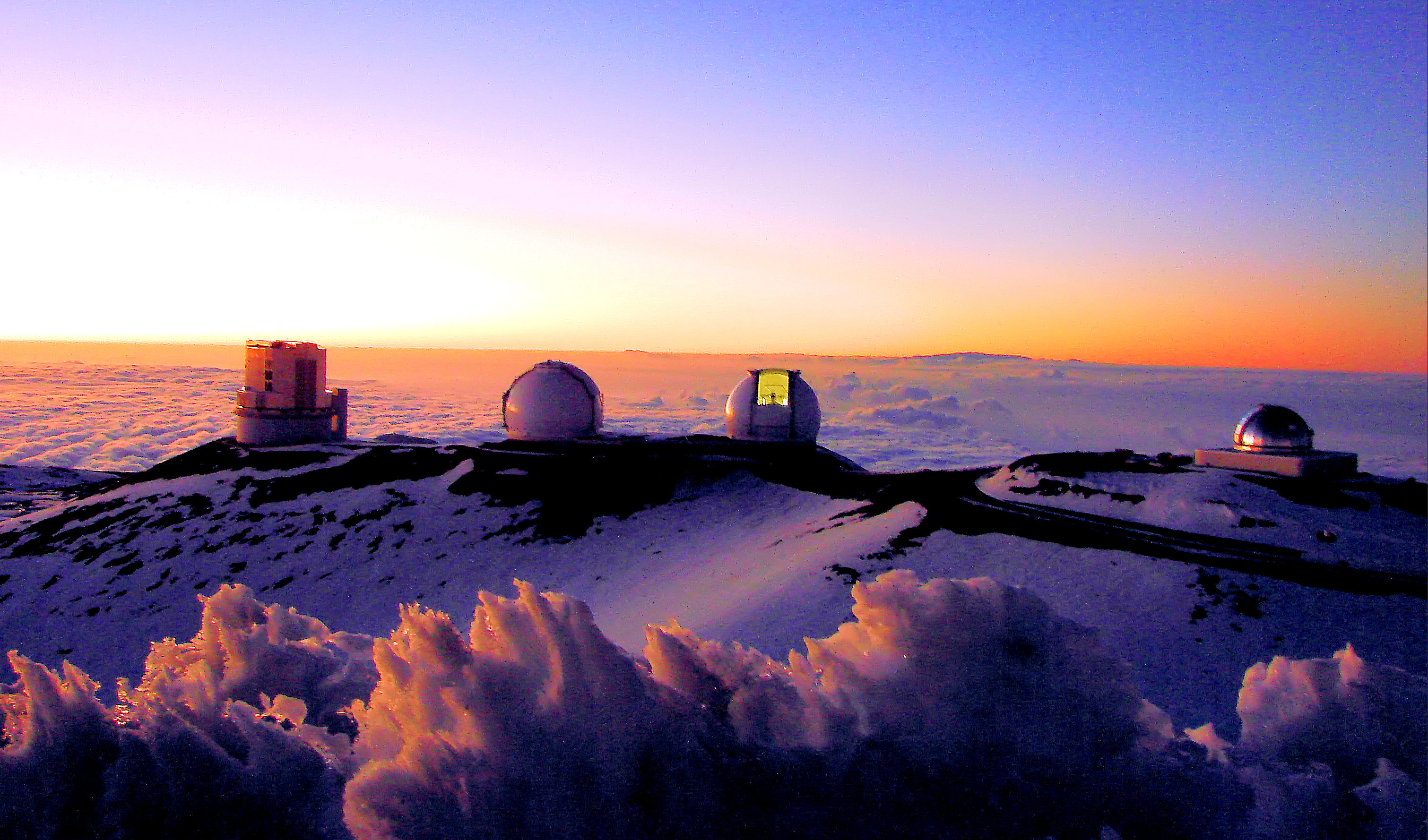
The music video of "Finale" was entirely filmed in various locations in the island of Hawaiʻi, including the Subaru Telescope (NAOJ), the twin W. M. Keck Observatory telescopes (California Association for Research in Astronomy/JPL) and the Infrared Telescope Facility (NASA), at the Mauna Kea Observatories.

=== Neo Universe ===
The music video of "Neo Universe" was directed by Fumihide Anami. The concept of the music video is the world of the 25th century, and is set in a bar in a Neo-futurism City.

=== Finale ===
The music video of "Finale" was directed by Wataru Takeishi, who previously directed many music video for the band including Winter Fall, Dive to Blue and Driver's High. Unlike many music video from the songs were a part of a movie soundtrack or featured in a film at that time (such as I Disappear by Metallica and Take a Look Around by Limp Bizkit, both from Mission: Impossible 2), The music video of "Finale" was developed as an independent L'Arc-en-Ciel clip devoid of any footage from "Ringu 0", since the music video of "Finale" was entirely filmed in various locations in the island of Hawaiʻi, including South Point Complex, Kīlauea and Mauna Kea Observatories. Despite the video doesn't features clips from the movie, it could not be included on any of the DVD releases of Ringu 0: Birthday, since SMEJ and Ki/oon didn't involved as the main production companies for the film. although it was included in the band second video compilation Chronicle 2 in 2001.

== Release ==
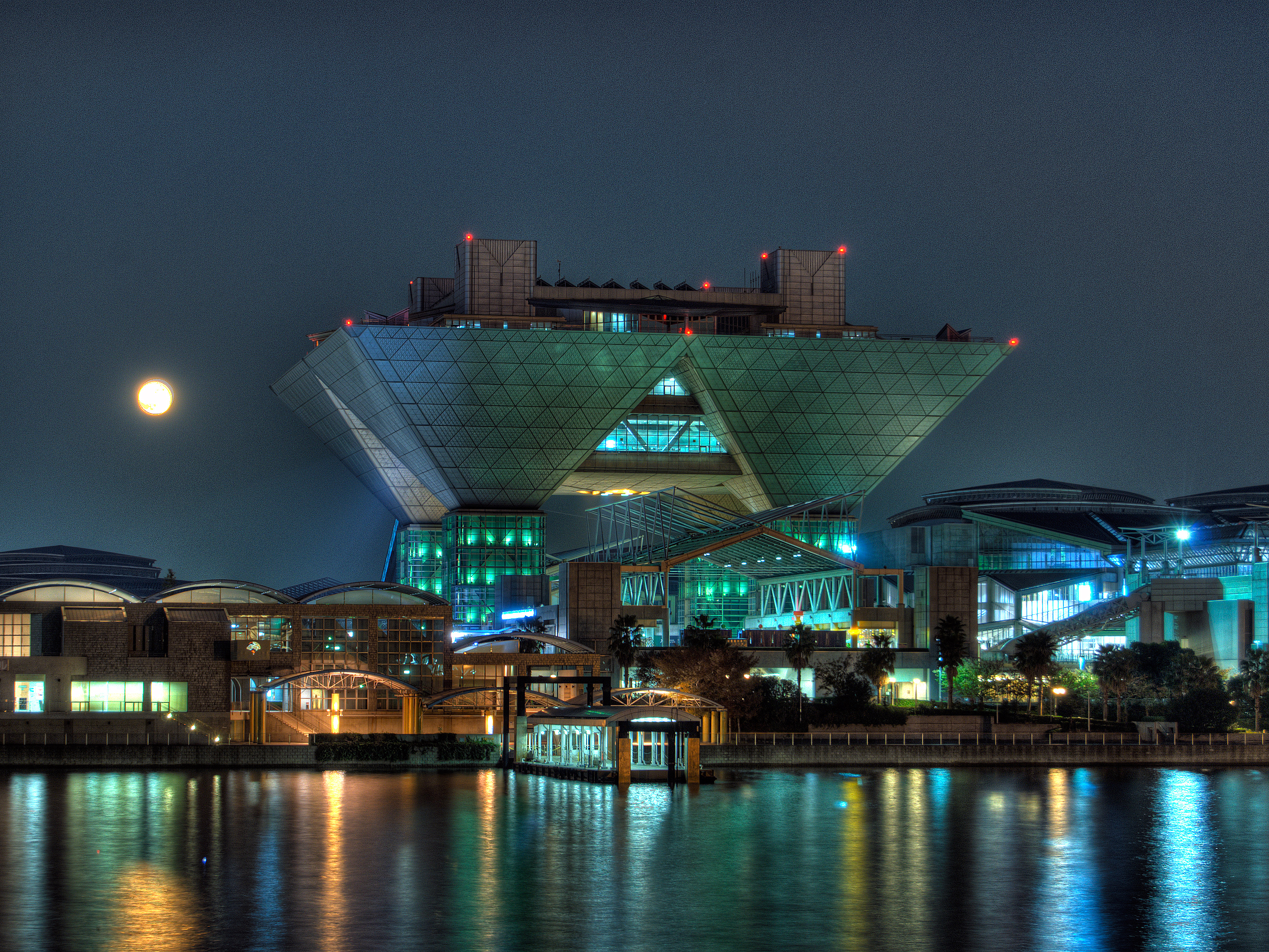
L'Arc-en-ciel performed both "Neo Universe" and "Finale" for the first time on the "RESET>>LIVE *000" Concerts at the Tokyo Big Sight (pictured in 2007) on December 31, 1999.

The promotion for the "Neo Universe/Finale" began a month before its release, To support the released, The Double feature trailers of Ringu 0 and ISOLA Taju-jinkaku Shojo was released on Toho and Rokubu Kogyo-affiliated Movie Theaters. this Double feature trailer which appeared with many films including Godzilla 2000, Fight Club, Tarzan, Random Hearts and End of Days, began with 6 seconds of the final hook-section of the unknown L'Arc-en-ciel song before being interrupted by a screaming voice of Sadako Yamamura, this double feature trailer was end with a partial cast and staff credits for both Ringu 0 and ISOLA, along with a reveal of the release date for double feature and a reveal to moviegoers that the unknown L'Arc-en-ciel song that play for 6 seconds during Ringu 0 trailer segment was actually "Finale". after the Double feature trailers of Ringu 0 and ISOLA was released, Ki/oon Records and Shiseido teamed up to release a non-retail sampler CD Version of "Neo Universe" which containing only 30 seconds of the Hook-section of the song that was used in the TV adverts for Shiseido pN lipsticks was produced and distributed. This sampler CD was first distributed at the Ginza Station on December 24th and 25th, 1999. the band performed both "Neo Universe" and "Finale" for the first time on the "RESET>>LIVE *000" Concerts at the Tokyo Big Sight on December 31, 1999. followed by the released "Neo Universe" and "Finale" to the radio formats through all Japanese commercial radio network systems (JFL, JFN, JRN, MegaNet and NRN) on January 1, 2000, along with the premiered of the 15-second TV adverts Teaser for "Neo Universe" and the released of a non-retail sampler CD Version of "Neo Universe" at the Shibuya Crossing and Harajuku.

=== Release Packaging ===
"Neo Universe/Finale" was released exclusively on standard 120 mm Compact Disc Digital Audio format in both slimline jewel cases with Spine Card "Standard Edition", or Spine Card-less 4-panel Digipak case "Limited Edition". The artwork for both cover art and label side of CD was designed by photographer and art director Mote Sinabel Aoki, the label side of CD also including much-wider The Ring Circle in form of the closed-ended ensō symbol, which is associated with enlightenment, emptiness, freedom, and the state of no-mind. AMD would later implementing the ensō symbol into the retail packaging box of the "Ryzen", "Threadripper" and Zen-based "Athlon" processors family, although ensō symbol design that AMD implemented was opened-ended instead of closed-ended. AMD ultimately began phase-out the ensō symbol from the processor retail packaging box with the released of the "Storm Peak" Threadripper 7000 series and the "Granite Ridge" Ryzen 9000 series.

== Commercial performance ==
Despite the band's previous singles "Love Flies" was unable to breaking the half-million copies barrier, "Neo Universe/Finale" made big debuts In its first week, debuting at number one on the Oricon charts during the chart week of January 31, 2000. ultimately became the biggest first week sales of 2000 at the time, with 537,380 copies sold in its first week of release, In its second and third week, it sold an additional 249,850 and 151,620 copies respectively. "Neo Universe/Finale" ultimately breaking the million seller barrier in its fourth week of release, as it sold an additional 65,580 copies for a selling total of 1,004,430 copies. "Neo Universe/Finale" was received the Million Seller Albums certified by the RIAJ on April of that same year. "Neo Universe/Finale" ultimately selling a total of 1,103,880 copies. the successful released of "Neo Universe/Finale" was mainly fueled by Sony Music Entertainment Japan decision to not including either the full track version or the 4 minutes theatrical cut version of "Finale" in the film official soundtrack CD released by Kadokawa Shoten Publishing.

== Track listing ==
#	Title	Lyrics	Music
1	"Neo Universe"	Hyde	Ken
2	"Finale"	Hyde	Tetsu
3	"hole"	‐	Yukihiro
4	"Trick - (New Wave of Japanese Heavy Metal Mix)"	Yukihiro	Yukihiro*

* Remix by Yukihiro.
