= Clicked Singles Best 13 =

Greatest hits album by L'Arc-en-Ciel
- Released: March 14, 2001
- Genre: Pop rock, alternative rock
- Length: 62:23 (JP)
- Label: Ki/oon

L'Arc-en-Ciel chronology
Real (2000)	Clicked Singles Best 13 (2001)	The Best of L'Arc-en-Ciel 1994–1998 (2003)

Clicked Singles Best 13 is a compilation album released by L'Arc-en-Ciel on March 14, 2001. As the title suggests, it collects previously released singles, with the addition of a new track, "Anemone" (written and composed by vocalist Hyde). There are several alternative editions to the one released in Japan, which have either differently ordered or additional tracks. Reached the top of Oricon Albums Chart.

== Track listing ==
Japanese edition (also released in China, Malaysia and the Philippines)
No.	Title	Length
1.	"Blurry Eyes"
2.	"Flower"
3.	"Lies and Truth"
4.	"Niji"
5.	"Winter Fall"
6.	"Dive to Blue"
7.	"Honey"
8.	"Heaven's Drive"
9.	"Pieces"
10.	"Driver's High"
11.	"Neo Universe"
12.	"Stay Away"
13.	"Anemone"

Korean edition
No.	Title	Length
1.	"Blurry Eyes"
2.	"Flower"
3.	"Lies and Truth"
4.	"Niji"
5.	"Winter Fall"
6.	"Dive to Blue"
7.	"Honey"
8.	"Heaven's Drive"
9.	"Pieces"
10.	"Driver's High"
11.	"Neo Universe"
12.	"Stay Away"
13.	"Anemone"
14.	"Natsu no Yuutsu ~Time to Say Goodbye~"
15.	"Snow Drop"

Hong Kong edition (also released in Thailand)
No.	Title	Length
1.	"Blurry Eyes"
2.	"Flower"
3.	"Niji"
4.	"Winter Fall"
5.	"Dive to Blue"
6.	"Honey"
7.	"Heaven's Drive"
8.	"Pieces"
9.	"Driver's High"
10.	"Neo Universe"
11.	"Finale"
12.	"Stay Away"
13.	"Anemone"

Taiwanese edition
No.	Title	Length
1.	"Blurry Eyes"
2.	"Flower"
3.	"Niji"
4.	"Winter Fall"
5.	"Dive to Blue"
6.	"Honey"
7.	"Snow Drop"
8.	"Heaven's Drive"
9.	"Pieces"
10.	"Driver's High"
11.	"Neo Universe"
12.	"Stay Away"
13.	"Anemone"

== Personnel ==
- Hyde – vocals
- Ken – guitar
- Tetsu – bass guitar, backing vocals
- Sakura/Yukihiro – drums
