= List of Oricon number-one singles of 1998 =

The following is a list of Oricon number-one singles of 1998.

== Oricon Weekly Singles Chart ==
Issue date	Song	Artist(s)	Ref.
January 5	"Aisareru yori Aishitai"	KinKi Kids	
January 12	"Can You Celebrate? (Wedding Mix)"	Namie Amuro	
January 19	"Face the Change"	Every Little Thing	
January 26	"Yozora no Mukō"	SMAP	
February 2	"Ashita ga Kikoeru/Children's Holiday"	J-Friends	
February 9	"Winter fall"	L'Arc-en-Ciel	
February 16	"Kyūkon"	The Yellow Monkey	
February 23	"Nishi e higashi e"	Mr. Children	
March 2	"My Graduation"	Speed	
March 9	"My Graduation"	Speed	
March 16	"My Graduation"	Speed	
March 23	"Be Yourself!"	V6	
March 30	"Nagai Aida"	Kiroro	
April 6	"Dive to Blue"	L'Arc-en-Ciel	
April 13	"Dive to Blue"	L'Arc-en-Ciel	
April 20	"Samayoeru aoi dangan"	B'z	
April 27	"Storm"	Luna Sea	
May 4	"Jet Coaster Romance"	KinKi Kids	
May 11	"Yuuwaku"	Glay	
May 18	"Yuuwaku"	Glay	
May 25	"Pink Spider"	hide with Spread Beaver	
June 1	"Pink Spider"	hide with Spread Beaver	
June 8	"Ever free"	hide with Spread Beaver	
June 15	"Shine"	Luna Sea	
June 22	"There will be love there"	The Brilliant Green	
June 29	"Forever Yours"	Every Little Thing	
July 6	"Hot Limit"	TMRevolution	
July 13	"Alive"	Speed	
July 20	"Home"	B'z	
July 27	"Honey"	L'Arc-en-Ciel	
August 3	"Power"	Pocket Biscuits	
August 10	"Zenbu Dakishimete"	KinKi Kids	
August 17	"Zenbu Dakishimete"	KinKi Kids	
August 24	"Zenbu Dakishimete"	KinKi Kids	
August 31	"Zenbu Dakishimete"	KinKi Kids	
September 7	"Tsumetai hana"	The Brilliant Green	
September 14	"Wanna be a dreammaker"	Globe	
September 21	"Daite Hold on Me!"	Morning Musume	
September 28	"Unmei no roulette mawashite"	Zard	
October 5	"Sa Yo Na Ra"	Globe	
October 12	"Sweet Heart"	Globe	
October 19	"Snow Drop"	L'Arc-en-Ciel	
October 26	"Forbidden Lover"	L'Arc-en-Ciel	
November 2	"Owari naki tabi"	Mr. Children	
November 9	"All My True Love"	Speed	
November 16	"All My True Love"	Speed	
November 23	"Over"	V6	
November 30	"Camouflage"	Mariya Takeuchi	
December 7	"Be with You"	Glay	
December 14	"Be with You"	Glay	
December 21	"Happy Happy Greetings"	KinKi Kids	
December 28	"Toku made"	Kōshi Inaba	
