= Heaven's Drive =

1999 single by L'Arc-en-Ciel

Single by L'Arc-en-Ciel

from the album Ark
- Released: April 21, 1999
- Genre: Alternative rock
- Label: Ki/oon Records
- Songwriter(s): Hyde
- Producer(s): L'Arc-en-Ciel, Hajime Okano

L'Arc-en-Ciel singles chronology
| "Forbidden Lover" (1998) | "Heaven's Drive" (1999) | "Pieces" (1999) |

"Heaven's Drive" is the sixteenth single by L'Arc-en-Ciel, released on April 21, 1999. The single sold over 634,000 copies in the first week of release. It topped the Oricon chart for two weeks and sold over one million copies. The band performed the song at the 50th Kōhaku Uta Gassen.

The length of its b-side "Metropolis ~Android Goes to Sleep Mix~" is 9 minutes 59 seconds. The song "Metropolis" was originally included in the single "Winter Fall" as the b-side.

== Track listing ==
| # | Title | Lyrics | Music |
|---|---|---|---|
| 1 | "Heaven's Drive" | Hyde | Hyde |
| 2 | "Metropolis ~Android Goes to Sleep Mix~" | Hyde | Ken* |

* Remix by Yukihiro.
