= Gekitotsu Toma L'Arc: TomaRunner vs L'Arc-en-Ciel =

2000 video game

- Developer(s): Desert Productions (Note: Additional work by Sony Computer Entertainment Japan.)
- Publisher(s): Sony Computer Entertainment
- Platform(s): PlayStation
- Release: JP: July 19, 2000
- Genre(s): Racing
- Mode(s): Single-player; Multiplayer

Gekitotsu Toma L'Arc: TomaRunner vs L'Arc-en-Ciel (激突トマラルク) is a 2000 racing game developed by Desert Productions and published by Sony Computer Entertainment for the PlayStation. It is the sequel to Gekisou TomaRunner and includes members of the Japanese band L'Arc-en-Ciel as playable characters; like its predecessor it was only released in Japan,

Each member of the band voices the in-game characters themselves. The L'Arc-en-Ciel songs that play within the game are "Driver's High", "Stay Away", "Route 666", "Trick", and "Niji".

The game was popular enough to receive a PS one Books re-release on December 21, 2001.
