= Love Flies =

Single by L'Arc-en-Ciel

from the album Real
- Released: October 27, 1999
- Genre: Alternative rock
- Label: Ki/oon Records
- Songwriter(s): Hyde, Ken
- Producer(s): L'Arc-en-Ciel, Hajime Okano

L'Arc-en-Ciel singles chronology
"Driver's High" (1999)	"Love Flies" (1999)	"Neo Universe/Finale" (2000)

"Love Flies" is the nineteenth single by L'Arc-en-Ciel, released on October 27, 1999. The b-side is Yukihiro's remix version of the song "Shinjitsu to Gensou to" from their 1999 album Ark. The single debuted at number 1 on the Oricon chart, and charted for another 13 weeks.

== Track listing ==
#	Title	Lyrics	Music
1	"Love Flies"	Hyde	Ken
2	"Shinjitsu to Gensou to ~Out of the Reality Mix~" (真実と幻想と, With the Truth and Fantasy)	Hyde	Ken*

* Remix by Yukihiro.
