= Pieces (L'Arc-en-Ciel song) =

Single by L'Arc-en-Ciel

from the album Ark
- Released: June 2, 1999
- Genre: Pop rock
- Label: Ki/oon Records
- Songwriters: Hyde, Tetsu
- Producers: L'Arc-en-Ciel, Hajime Okano

L'Arc-en-Ciel singles chronology
"Heaven's Drive" (1999)	"Pieces" (1999)	"Driver's High" (1999)

"Pieces" is the seventeenth single by L'Arc-en-Ciel, released on June 2, 1999 it debuted at number 1 on the Oricon chart. "Pieces" was awarded "Best Video of the Year" at "Space Shower Music Video Awards 99". It sold 483890 copies in its first week.

The b-side "Fate (Fake Fate Mix)" is Yukihiro's remix version of "Fate" from their 1998 album Heart.

== Track listing ==
#	Title	Lyrics	Music
1	"Pieces"	Hyde	Tetsu
2	"Fate ~Fake Fate Mix~"	Hyde	Ken*

* Remix by Yukihiro.
