= Real (L'Arc-en-Ciel album) =

Studio album by L'Arc-en-Ciel
- Released: August 30, 2000
- Genre: Alternative rock
- Length: 54:16
- Label: Ki/oon
- Producer: L'Arc-en-Ciel; Hajime Okano

L'Arc-en-Ciel chronology
Ectomorphed Works (2000)	Real (2000)	Clicked Singles Best 13 (2001)

Singles from Real
- 1. "Love Flies" Released: October 27, 1999; 2. "Neo Universe/Finale" Released: January 19, 2000; 3. "Stay Away" Released: July 19, 2000

Real is the eighth album by L'Arc-en-Ciel, released on August 30, 2000. It was the band's last original studio album before a prolonged hiatus. It reached number one on the Oricon chart and sold over a million copies, being certified by the RIAJ. The album cover features a photo taken by Mote Sinabel of a gargoyle found on the Notre Dame Cathedral in Paris, France.

One of the singles from the album, "Stay Away", is a playable song in the computer game DrumMania 4th Mix.

== Track listing ==
All lyrics are written by hyde, except track 4 by tetsu.

No.	Title	Music	Length
1.	"Get out from the Shell -Asian Version-"	yukihiro	4:16
2.	"The Nepenthes"	ken	3:26
3.	"Neo Universe"	ken	4:08
4.	"Bravery"	tetsu	5:27
5.	"Love Flies"	ken	4:54
6.	"Finale"	tetsu	6:26
7.	"Stay Away"	tetsu	3:59
8.	"Route 666"	hyde	4:28
9.	"Time Slip"	ken	5:00
10.	"A Silent Letter"	ken	6:39
11.	"All Year Around Falling in Love"	hyde	5:33

== Personnel ==
- hyde – vocals, rhythm guitar on track 2, keyboards on track 11
- ken – guitar, keyboards on tracks 3, 5, 6, 10, 11
- tetsu – bass guitar, backing vocals, keyboards on tracks 6 and 7
- yukihiro – drums, keyboards on track 1
- K – female voice on tracks 2 and 10
- Hajime Okano – keyboards on tracks 3, 5, 6, 7 and 11
- Hitoshi Saitou – keyboards on tracks 6, 7 and 11
- Cheiko – backing vocals on track 3
- Nobuhiko Nakayama – synthesizer on track 4
- Ittetsu Gen – strings on track 6
- Yasushi Nakanishi – Hammond organ on track 8
- Chokkaku – keyboards on track 8

== Charts ==
=== Weekly charts ===
Chart (2000)	Peak position
Japanese Albums (Oricon)	1

=== Year-end charts ===
Chart (2000)	Position
Japanese Albums (Oricon)	13

== Certifications ==
Region	Certification	Certified units/sales
Japan (RIAJ)	3× Platinum	1,200,000^{^}
^{^} Shipments figures based on certification alone.
