= Floods of Tears =

"Floods of Tears/Yasouka"

Single by L'Arc-en-Ciel

from the album Dune
- Released: November 25, 1992
- Genre: Alternative rock, gothic rock, post-punk
- Label: Night Gallery Records
- Songwriters: hyde, tetsu, ken
- Producer: L'Arc-en-Ciel

L'Arc-en-Ciel singles chronology
"Floods of Tears/Yasouka" (1992)	"Blurry Eyes" (1994)

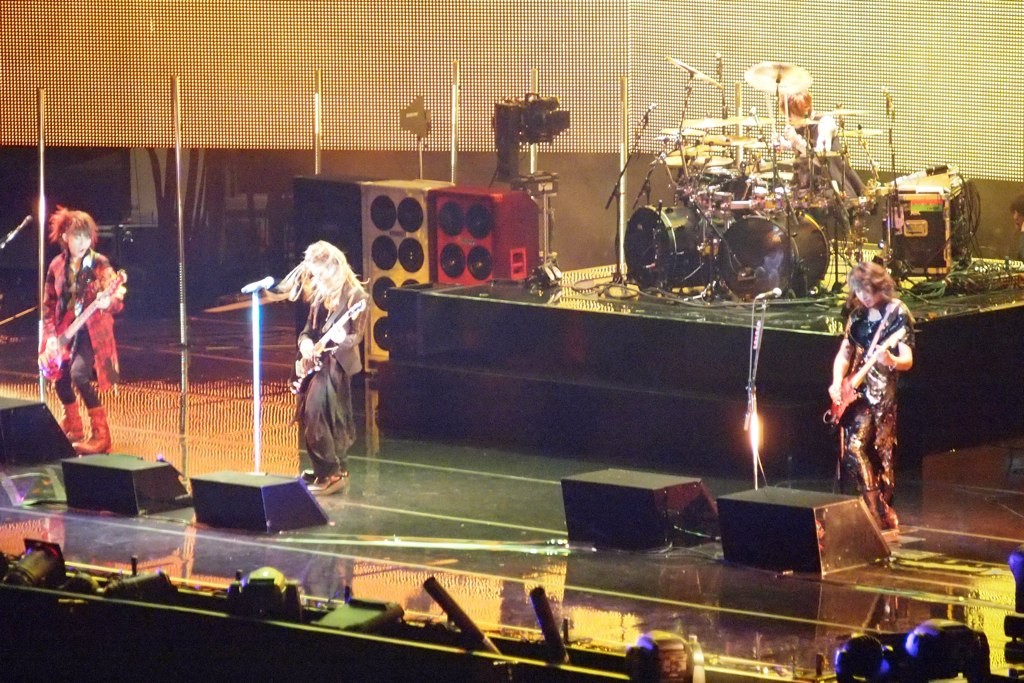
L'arc En Ciel

"Floods of Tears"/"Yasouka" (夜想花) is the debut single by L'Arc-en-Ciel, released on November 25, 1992. It was a limited release and only 1,000 copies were produced.

== Track listing ==
#	Title	Length	Lyrics	Music
1	"Floods of Tears"	5:41	hyde	tetsu
2	"Yasouka" (夜想花)	5:34	hyde	ken

== Personnel ==
- hyde – vocals
- ken – guitar
- tetsu – bass, backing vocals
- PERO – drums
- Kenji Shimizu – keyboards
