= Petit Brabancon (band) =

Japanese heavy metal band

- Origin: Japan
- Genres: Hardcore punk; nu metal
- Years active: 2021–present
- Label: Danger Crue
- Members: Kyo; Yukihiro; Miya; Hirofumi Takamatsu; Antz
- Website: www.petitbrabancon.jp

Petit Brabancon is a Japanese supergroup, active since 2021. It consists of vocalist Kyo (Dir En Grey), drummer Yukihiro (L'Arc-en-Ciel), guitarists Miya (Mucc) and Antz (Tokyo Shoegazer), and bassist Hirofumi Takamatsu (The Novembers). Having been secretly writing and recording music since 2018 or 2019, the band was not publicly unveiled until December 2021.

== History ==
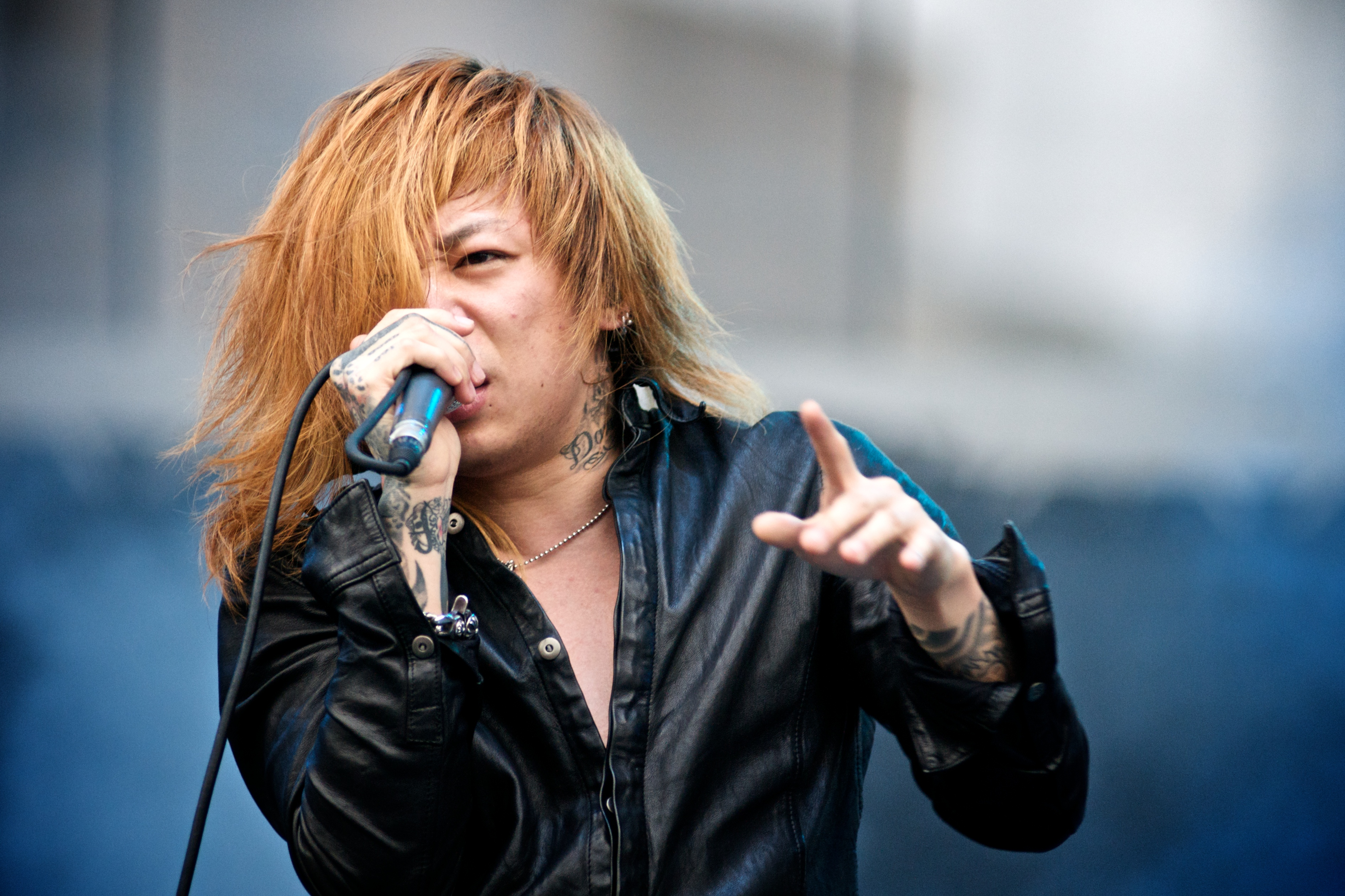
Kyo (pictured) formed Petit Brabancon out of his desire to make music with Yukihiro.

A big fan of Yukihiro since his days in Zi:Kill, Dir En Grey vocalist Kyo approached the drummer about working together four or five years previously. With Kyo not interested in duos, they set out to recruit a five-member band. Needing someone more prolific in composing than himself, Yukihiro suggested Mucc guitarist Miya, believing he would also match Kyo's style of loud music. Miya accepted after talking and drinking with Kyo and learning all that the two had in common, such as upbringings and music tastes, including both being big fans of Zi:Kill. He started composing songs in 2018 or 2019. It was a while before Yukihiro suggested The Novembers bassist Hirofumi Takamatsu and Tokyo Shoegazer guitarist Kiyomi "Antz" Watanabe to complete the lineup. Takamatsu said he accepted immediately after getting a call from Yukihiro's manager in 2019. He started using a five-string bass, something he had never done before, at the other members' request. Antz had played in Yukihiro's Acid Android project for about ten years, but left them in 2012. His Tokyo Shoegazer bandmate Hiroshi Sasabuchi had spoken with Yukihiro and told Antz to get in touch with him. After they caught up in person, Yukihiro then called Antz and asked him to join the new band in 2019. Not wanting a cool name or a funny one, Kyo named the group after the Petit Brabançon dog breed. He said, despite being a small breed, they have an image of being feisty and barking a lot. He personally owns a dog of a very similar breed.

Petit Brabancon was first announced on October 29, 2021, as an unknown act set to perform at the Danger Crue 40th Anniversary Jack in the Box 2021 event at the Nippon Budokan on December 27. Its members were only revealed alongside an artist photo on December 6. Days before the show, the digital-only double A-side single "Koku / Kawaki", containing three songs, was released on December 24. The band's first solo live was held at Club Citta on January 14, 2022. However, it was limited to 29 attendees and noted in advance to be shorter than usual as it was filmed to be used in promotional videos. "Kawaki", their first physical single, was released on April 27, included four songs, and was mastered by Ted Jensen. Petit Brabancon's first album, Fetish, was released on August 31. All lyrics were written by Kyo, while the majority of the music was composed by Miya, with Antz composing four songs, and Yukihiro one. The band's first tour, Resonance of the Corpse, took place at five locations between September 8 and 21. Before the tour, they announced the Petit Brabancon fashion line centered on streetwear.

Petit Brabancon performed at Knotfest Japan on April 2, 2023. They released the five-track Automata EP on June 14 and held the six-date Indented Bite Mark tour throughout July. The July 29 final date of the tour was cancelled after Takamatsu tested positive for COVID-19 the day before. In January 2024, the band performed two shows at Line Cube Shibuya in Tokyo and two at Namba Hatch in Osaka. They sold a two-track CD exclusively at the two Tokyo concerts, the content of which depended on the day, and the first Osaka show was a two-man live with Rottengraffty. Petit Brabancon released their second EP, Seven Garbage Born of Hatred, on August 7 and held the Burst City tour throughout September. Throughout March 2025 they will hold the Cross Counter -01- tour, with some dates also featuring Rottengraffty, Spark!! Sound!! Show!!, or The Bonez.

== Musical style ==
Yukihiro explained that Petit Brabancon came about because Kyo wanted to do something "extreme" with him. Miya speculated that Kyo wanted to combine his usual intense and loud music with Yukihiro's punk-like style of drumming. The guitarist also felt that Kyo's vision for the band was more hardcore than heavy metal. Antz said after he joined, all five members got together and words like "nu metal/loud rock from the 90s–00s" came up. Ryōsuke Tarakane of Mikiki wrote that, while based in nu metal, industrial and alternative rock, Petit Brabancon's music is unrestrained by genre boundaries and has an eerie experimental spirit. Vocalist Kyo said he wants to keep the switching between tones and singing styles from one song to the next more restrained than in Dir En Grey. Before their first tour, Kyo said he believed that Petit Brabancon was a "live band" and that the songs will sound "rougher", in a good way, when they play them live.

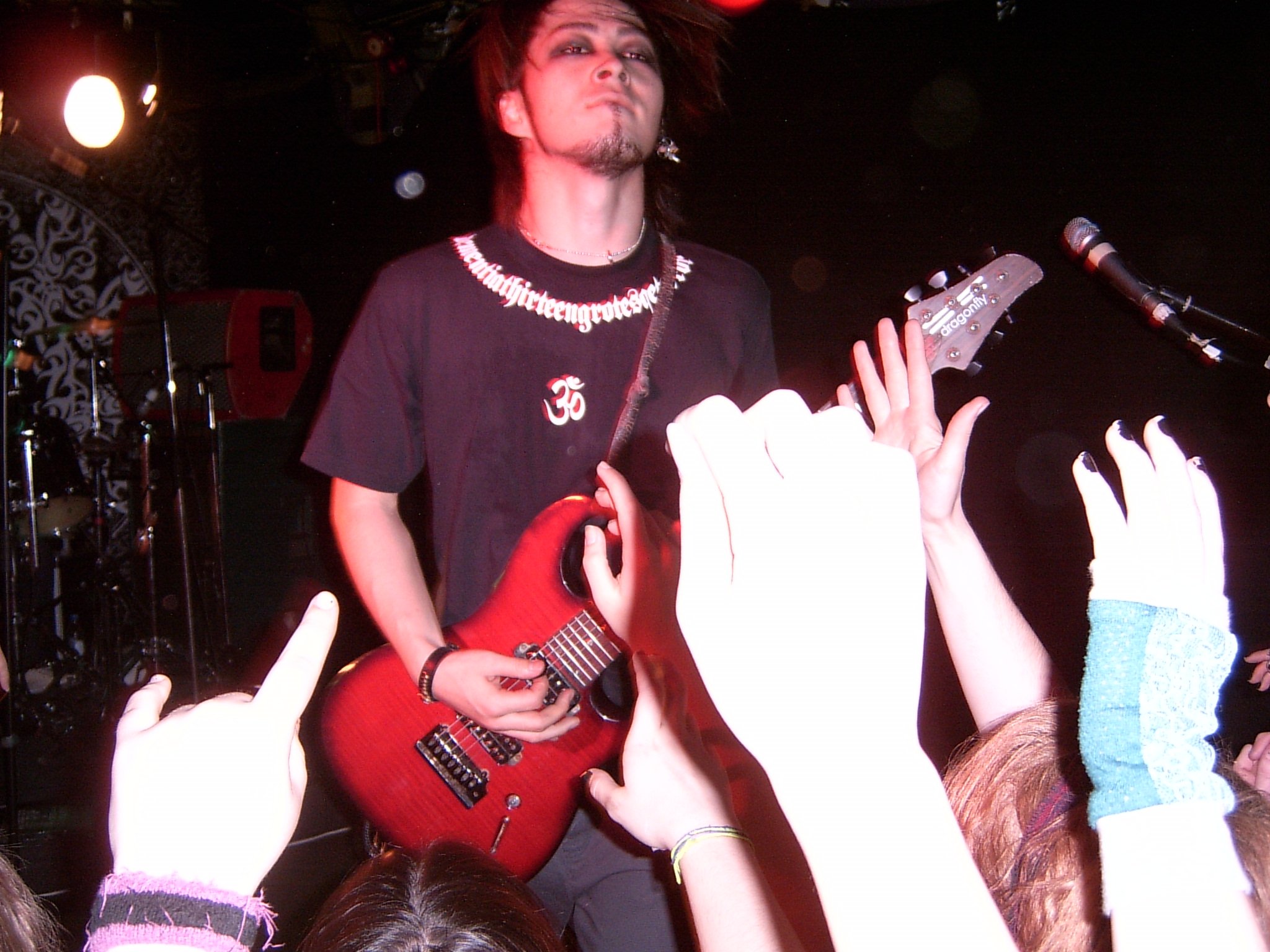
Miya is the principal composer of music in the band.

Although Kyo comes up with all the melodies in his other bands, Miya often wrote the melodies in Petit Brabancon, while sometimes the two collaborated on them. Miya said he would often ask the singer to sing melodies unlike those in his other bands, and likewise asked Yukihiro to play drum phrases he normally would not. Miya also said that he takes the supporting guitar role, playing slightly behind Antz to give a three-dimensional sound. Antz agreed with the assessment that Miya's songs form the core of Petit Brabancon, and he wants his own songs to bring out other elements of the band. Takamatsu described the songs composed by Miya as heavy but sprinkled with pop catchiness, and those composed by Antz as "ceremonial or religious" and "muddy" but with parts that feel like new wave. Antz's songs are full of ideas from the other members and ended up different than he had imagined, but the guitarist said he enjoyed the changes.

Due to the COVID-19 pandemic in Japan, the members recorded their parts for the first album separately; with the exception of the two guitarists, who recorded theirs together. Kyo said he prefers this, as he knows best when his voice is good; he will often record at 3 a.m. or 7–8 a.m. and send it to the others. Unusually, he often records his vocals before the drums and bass are dubbed onto the recording. Miya said he would prefer recording together and to record the drums first, but said that might not suit Petit Brabancon and they have already proven that doing it separate works. Kyo described Miya as very detail-oriented, similar to his Dir En Grey bandmate Kaoru. But Kyo himself prefers to make decisions in the moment, especially when performing live. He described the songs composed by Antz as having been easier for him to understand. As the band's lyricist, Kyo writes the lyrics and records his vocals at the same time. When an interviewer for the music website Barks suggested his lyrics express resentment, anger and frustration with the world, Kyo agreed, admitting to having a negative mindset. Miya agreed that the lyrics are coarse and said that despite being in Japanese, he wanted them to sound like they were not; he does not believe that the listener needs to understand every word.

== Members ==
- Kyo (京) – lead vocals (Dir En Grey, Sukekiyo)
- Yukihiro – drums, programming (L'Arc-en-Ciel, Acid Android, Die in Cries, Zi:Kill)
- Miya (ミヤ) – guitar, backing vocals (Mucc)
- Hirofumi Takamatsu (高松浩史) – bass, backing vocals (The Novembers)
- Antz – guitar, backing vocals (Tokyo Shoegazer, Acid Android)

== Discography ==
=== Studio albums ===
Year	Album details	Oricon	Billboard Japan Hot Albums	Billboard Japan Top Albums
2022	Fetish: Released: August 31, 2022; Label: Danger Crue	26	28	31

=== Extended plays ===
Year	EP details	Oricon	Billboard Japan Hot Albums	Billboard Japan Top Albums
2023	Automata: Released: June 14, 2023; Label: Danger Crue	32	24	29
2024	Seven Garbage Born of Hatred: Released: August 7, 2024; Label: Danger Crue	37	30	31

=== Singles ===
Year	Single details	Oricon	Billboard Japan Top Singles
2022	"Kawaki" (渇き; "Thirst"): Released: April 27, 2022	42	39

=== Video albums ===
Year	Video album details	Oricon Music DVD and Blu-ray Chart
2023	Resonance of the Corpse: Released: January 18, 2023	18
2025	Petit Brabancon Explode -02- "Live Log": Released: February 21, 2025	

=== Other releases ===
- "Koku / Kawaki" (刻 / 渇き; "Carving / Thirst") (December 24, 2021)
- "Miserable" (May 31, 2023)
- "A Humble Border" (December 13, 2023)
- "Petit Brabancon Explode -02- Gushing Blood" (sold only at the Line Cube Shibuya concert on January 2, 2024)
- "Petit Brabancon Explode -02- Neglected Human" (sold only at the Line Cube Shibuya concert on January 3, 2024)
- "Batman" (June 28, 2024)
- "Vendetta" (July 17, 2024)
