= Blurry Eyes =

Single by L'Arc-en-Ciel

from the album Tierra
- Released: October 21, 1994
- Genre: Pop rock, alternative rock
- Length: 4:20
- Label: Ki/oon Sony Records
- Songwriters: Hyde, Tetsu
- Producers: L'Arc-en-Ciel, Haruo Togashi

L'Arc-en-Ciel singles chronology
"Floods of Tears"	"Blurry Eyes" (1994)	"Vivid Colors" (1995)

"Blurry Eyes" is the second single by Japanese rock band L'Arc-en-Ciel, released on October 21, 1994, by Ki/oon Sony Records.

== Overview ==
This is their first single in about three months since their major debut single "Nemuri ni Yosete" was released on July 1, 1994. The title track of this work is a re-cut from their second album, Tierra, released on July 14, 1994. Since their previous work was a video single, this work is positioned as their first CD single and reached number 22 on the Oricon chart. The title track appears on the soundtrack of the DNA² anime. The single was re-released on August 30, 2006, and reached number 12 on the Oricon chart. In 2012, Vince Neil covered the song for a tribute album.

The title track of this album, "Blurry Eyes", is a memorable rock number with light guitar, rhythmically running bass, and technical drumming. L'Arc~en~Ciel is a band that doesn't often play songs released in their early days live, but this song is performed relatively consistently. The title track was also used as the opening theme for the TV anime "D.N.A² ~That Guy Who Lost It Somewhere~", which aired on the Nippon Television Network from October 7, 1994.

The B-side is "Wind of Gold (Many Kind of Percussion Mix)," a rearranged version of the song "Wind of Gold," which was first included on the album Tierra.

== Music video ==
The music video for the title track "Blurry Eyes" was directed by Shingo Goto. The video includes a fantastic scene of a merry-go-round shining in the middle of the night, which was filmed at Yomiuri Land. The location of the filming was revealed in a conversation between Tetsuya and Sakura on a radio program broadcast in 1996. However, despite this episode, many listeners still mistakenly believe that the filming location was Toshimaen. In 2020, Tetsuya again mentioned the actual filming location on a radio program he hosts, saying, "That's Yomiuri Land."

This music video was first included in the video single "and She Said" released on May 21, 1995. It was also included in the limited edition DVD of the best album The Best of L'Arc-en-Ciel 1994–1998 released on March 19, 2003, and in the clip collection CHRONICLE 0 -ZERO- released on February 14, 2007. On December 11, 2019, the video was made available for a fee on the official YouTube artist channel, exclusively for YouTube Music Premium users. On April 1, 2022, about two years and four months after the paid release on the aforementioned YouTube channel, the video was made available for free on the same site.

== Track listing ==
No.	Title	Lyrics	Music	Length
1.	"Blurry Eyes"	Hyde	Tetsu	4:22
2.	"Wind of Gold (Many Kind of Percussion Mix)"	Hyde	Ken	4:36
3.	"Blurry Eyes (Voiceless Version)"		Tetsu	4:21

== Participating musicians ==
- Hyde: Vocals
- Ken: Guitar
- Tetsu: Bass
- Sakura: Drums & percussion
- Haruo Togashii: Keyboard
