= The Novembers =

Japanese band

THE NOVEMBERS
- Origin: Utsunomiya, Tochigi, Japan
- Genres: Alternative rock; indie rock; post-hardcore; shoegazing; gothic rock
- Years active: 2005–present
- Labels: Daizawa Records; Merz; MAGNIPH/Hostess
- Members: Kobayashi Yusuke; Matsumoto Kengo; Takamatsu Hirofumi; Yoshiki Ryousuke
- Website: the-novembers.com

THE NOVEMBERS is a four-piece Japanese alternative rock band.

A preceding band was first formed in 2002 by Kobayashi Yusuke and Takamatsu Hirofumi. Subsequently, the preceding band disbanded in 2005, and "The Novembers" was officially formed in March 2005 with Kobayashi and Takamatsu joined first by drummer Yoshiki Ryousuke in August 2005, before its current lineup solidified in October 2005 with the arrival of Matsumoto Kengo.

The band released two demo albums in 2006 before making its indie debut on UK Project's Daizawa Record with the release of their album, The Novembers in November, 2007.

They launched their independent label MERZ in October 2013 and also played a variety of Japanese festivals, such as appearing at the Red Marquee stage at the Fuji Rock Festival in 2014.

In October 2015 they joined forces with producer Masami Tsuchiya (Blankey Jet City, GLAY) and released their fifth EP, Elegance. The band celebrated their 11th anniversary (its significance highlighted by their namesake) by inviting an array of guests such as Boris, Klan Aileen, MONO, Roth Bart Baron, Art-School, Burgh, acid android, Takkyu Ishino, and The Birthday to their self-produced event series named "KUBI", as well as releasing their sixth album, Hallelujah, becoming the first Japanese artist to release on the MAGNIPH / Hostess joint label. The subsequent album release tour culminated in 11th anniversary show on November 11 at Shinkiba STUDIO COAST in Tokyo. The TODAY EP was released in May 2018 and their 7th album, ANGELS, arrived in March 2019.

To create their 8th album, At The Beginning, THE NOVEMBERS collaborated with yukihiro, drummer of L'Arc~en~Ciel.

They released their 9th album, The Novembers on 6 December 2023. It's a self-titled work, the first to bear the band's name since their debut EP in 2007. The intention behind the title is to convey "a rock album that distills who we are right now—we want people to feel the essence of The Novembers."

The Novembers celebrated their 20th anniversary with a special live performance titled "The Novembers 20th Anniversary -バースデイ-" on March 28, 2025, at HEAVEN'S ROCK Utsunomiya VJ-2, the city where the band was originally formed.

This commemorative concert marked exactly 20 years since their formation on March 28, 2005. During the show, they announced another milestone event: their first-ever hall one-man live, titled "Your November", scheduled for November 20, 2025, at LINE CUBE SHIBUYA in Tokyo.

A special page commemorating the 20th anniversary of the band's formation, "The Novembers Chronicle" has also opened on the official website.

They have also supported numerous international bands, including RIDE, Television, No Age, Mystery Jets, Wild Nothing, Thee Oh Sees, Dot Hacker, Astrobright and Yuck.

== Band members ==
- Yūsuke Kobayashi (小林祐介, born December 18, 1985) – vocals, guitar, keyboards - also vocalist in DECAYS and The Spellbound with Masayuki Nakano of Boom Boom Satellites
- Kengo Matsumoto (ケンゴマツモト, born June 1983) – guitar, keyboards
- Hirofumi Takamatsu (高松浩史, born November 19, 1985) – bass - also bassist in Petit Brabancon with Kyo, Yukihiro, Miya, and antz (Tokyo Shoegazer).
- Ryousuke Yoshiki (吉木諒祐, born November 1, 1985) – drums

== Discography ==
=== Studio albums ===
Year	Album details	Oricon chart
2008	Picnic: Released: March 6, 2008	96
2010	Misstopia: Released: March 10, 2010	56
2011	To (Melt Into): Released: August 3, 2011	45
2013	Zeitgeist: Released: November 30, 2013	289
2014	Rhapsody in Beauty: Released: October 15, 2014	40
2016	Hallelujah: Released: September 21, 2016	36
2019	ANGELS: Released: March 13, 2019	58
2020	At The Beginning: Released: May 14, 2020	
2023	The Novembers: Released: December 5, 2023	

=== EPs ===
Year	Album details	Oricon chart
2007	The Novembers: Released: November 7, 2007	202
2009	Paraphilia: Released: March 18, 2009	68
2012	Gift: Released: November 7, 2012	38
2013	Fourth Wall: Released: May 15, 2013	35
2015	Elegance: Released: October 7, 2015	59
2018	TODAY: Released: May 16, 2018	54
2026	“合奏する、エンジン“ (Gassou suru, Engine): Released: May 20, 2026	

=== Singles ===
Year	Title	Oricon chart
2011	"(Two) Into Holy": Released: August 3, 2011	39
2014	"今日も生きたね" (Kyou mo ikita ne): Released: May 14, 2014	51
2016	"黒い虹" (Black Rainbow): Released: July 21, 2016	—
2020	"理解者" (Rikai-sha): Released: May 13, 2020	
2020	"Rainbow": Released: May 20, 2020	
2023	"kanashimigakawaitara": Released: April 7, 2023	

=== Demos ===
Year	Information
2005	The Novembers: 1st demo; Released: August 13, 2005
2006	The Novembers: 2nd demo; Released: September 13, 2006
2006	The Novembers: 3rd demo; Released: October 13, 2006

=== DVDs and Blu-rays ===
Year	Information
2015	Tour Romance (Live At Studio Coast): Released: May 13, 2015
2017	美しい日: Released: September 25, 2017
2018	ROSES at Shinagawawa GLORIA CHAPEL: Released: August 22, 2018
2020	Live at TSUTAYA O-EAST "NEO TOKYO – 20191111 -": Released: March 19, 2020
2021	Live – At The Beginning – at 大谷資料館: Released: May 17, 2021
2022	Live -At The Beginning- at STUDIO COAST: Released: March 2022
2025	「The Novembers Release Tour 2024 2024.09.19 EBISU LIQUIDROOM」 + 「TOUR – UЯA – The Novembers」: Released: April 2025

=== Compilations appearances ===
Year	Song	Album	Notes
2005	"Brooklyn Saishuu Deguchi" (ブルックリン最終出口)	College of Kitazawa No. 3 (コラージュ オブ 北沢3丁目)	Released: May 30, 2005; Concept album by Shimokitazawa Garage and enndisc
2005	"She Lab Luck"	College of Kitazawa No. 3 (コラージュ オブ 北沢3丁目)	Released: May 30, 2005; Concept album by Shimokitazawa Garage and enndisc
2007	"Chernobyl"	Hi-Style ~Itaku Version 01~	Released: February 20, 2007; High Line Record Compilation No. 1
2012	"Human Flow"	Dip Tribute ~9faces~	Released: June 6, 2012
2012	"Stay Away"	Nevermind Tribute	Released: April 4, 2012; A tribute album to celebrates 20th anniversary of Nirvana's masterpiece album Nevermind.
2013	"Doubt"	Tribute VII -Rock Spirits-	Released: December 18, 2013
2025	“SWAN SONG”	『Dreams Never End』	Released: August 20, 2025 ART-SCHOOL 25th Anniversary Tribute Album

== Music videos ==
=== Official music videos ===
..

Year	Title	Director(s)
2009	"dnim"	KYABETWO FILM
2009	"she lab luck"	H. Koarai
2009	"こわれる" (To Break)	Kojima Takayuki
2010	"Misstopia"	Maruyama Taro
2011	"夢のあと" (After the Dream)	Maruyama Taro
2011	"彼岸で散る青" (Blue falling on the shore)	Kojima Takayuki
2012	"Harem"	Makoto Tezuka
2013	"dogma"	Takeshi Shibata
2013	"Flower of life"	Yu Adumi
2013	"鉄の夢" (The Iron Dream)	Yousuke Asada
2013	"Meursault"	Maruyama Taro
2014	"今日も生きたね" (I Lived Today As Well)	minsak
2014	"Romancé"	minsak
2015	"きれいな海へ (Mother Side)" (To the Beautiful Ocean)	TAIYOU KIKAKU
2015	"きれいな海へ (Father Side)" (To the Beautiful Ocean)	TAIYOU KIKAKU
2016	"黒い虹" (Black Rainbow)	minsak
2016	"1000年" (Year 1000)	Yousuke Asada
2017	"最近あなたの暮らしはどう" (How's Your Life Lately)	Yousuke Asada
2018	"みんな急いでいる" (Everyone is in a Hurry)	Yousuke Asada
2019	"BAD DREAM"	Yousuke Asada
2024	"BOY"	Yousuke Asada
