= Natsu no Yuu-utsu (Time to Say Good-bye) =

"Natsu no Yuu-utsu [Time to Say Good-bye]"

Single by L'Arc-en-Ciel

from the album The Best of L'Arc-en-Ciel 1994-1998
- Released: October 20, 1995
- Genre: Pop rock
- Length: 14:36
- Label: Ki/oon Sony Records
- Songwriters: Hyde, Ken
- Producers: L'Arc-en-Ciel, Akira Nishihira

L'Arc-en-Ciel singles chronology
"Vivid Colors" (1995)	"Natsu no Yuu-utsu [Time to Say Good-bye]" (1995)	"Kaze ni Kienaide" (1996)

"Natsu no Yuu-utsu [Time to Say Good-bye]" (夏の憂鬱[time to say good-bye], Natsu no Yūutsu [Taimu tou Sei Guddo-bai]; "Summer Melancholy") is the fourth single by L'Arc-en-Ciel, released on October 20, 1995 it reached number 22 on the Oricon chart. The title track is a remake of the song "Natsu no Yuu-utsu", released the previous month on their third album Heavenly, it is longer with different and additional lyrics as well as new music. The single was re-released on August 30, 2006.

== Track listing ==
#	Title	Lyrics	Music
1	"Natsu no Yuu-utsu [Time to Say Good-bye]"	Hyde	Ken
2	"Anata no Tame ni" (あなたのために, For You)	Hyde	Ken
3	"Natsu no Yuu-utsu [Time to Say Good-bye] (Voiceless Version)"	‐	Ken

== Chart positions ==
Chart (1995)	Peak position
Japan Oricon	15
