= DNA² =

Japanese manga series

- First tankōbon volume cover, featuring Karin Aoi

D・N・A² ～何処かで失くしたあいつのアイツ～ (Dī En Ei Tsū: Dokoka de Nakushita Aitsu no Aitsu)
- Genre: Romantic comedy; Science fiction
- Manga
- Written by: Masakazu Katsura
- Published by: Shueisha
- Imprint: Jump Comics
- Magazine: Weekly Shōnen Jump
- Original run: August 23, 1993 – July 4, 1994
- Volumes: 5
- Anime television series
- Directed by: Jun'ichi Sakata
- Written by: Tatsuhiko Urahata
- Music by: Fujio Takano
- Studio: Madhouse; Studio Deen
- Licensed by: NA: Discotek Media
- Original network: Nippon TV
- English network: SEA: Animax Asia
- Original run: October 7, 1994 – December 23, 1994
- Episodes: 12
- Original video animation
- Directed by: Jun'ichi Sakata
- Written by: Tatsuhiko Urahata
- Music by: Fujio Takano
- Studio: Madhouse; Studio Deen
- Licensed by: NA: Discotek Media
- Released: February 21, 1995 – June 25, 1995
- Runtime: 30 minutes per episode
- Episodes: 3
- icon

DNA² (Japanese: D・N・A² ～何処かで失くしたあいつのアイツ～, Hepburn: Dī En Ei Tsū: Dokoka de Nakushita Aitsu no Aitsu) is a Japanese manga series written and illustrated by Masakazu Katsura. It was serialized in Shueisha's shōnen manga magazine Weekly Shōnen Jump from August 1993 to July 1994, with its chapters collected in five tankōbon volumes.

A 12-episode anime television series adaptation, produced by Madhouse and Studio Deen, was broadcast on Nippon TV from October to December 1994. A three-episode original video animation (OVA) was released from February to June 1995. In North America, the TV series and the OVA were licensed by Central Park Media and released on DVD in 2003. Discotek Media re-licensed the series and released on DVD in 2014.

== Plot ==
Junta Momonari is a high school student with a very unusual problem. Whenever he becomes sexually aroused by a woman, his "female allergy" kicks in, causing him to throw up. One day, Junta is confronted by a girl in strange clothing who claims to be from the future. The girl, called Karin Aoi, tells him about how the world has become terribly overpopulated in her time, to the point where having more than one child is a crime punishable by death. At the root of the problem is a family of "Mega-Playboys": people with sexual charisma and impulses that lead each of them to have 100 children that carry the Mega-Playboy DNA, causing them and all their descendants to each have 100 children as well. All this started with a single Mega-Playboy, whom Karin has travelled back into the past to deal with. Karin reveals to Junta that she is a "DNA Operator". Her job is to make alterations in people's DNA that will change their nature for the greater good of society. She intends to shoot the original Mega-Playboy with a DCM ("DNA Control Medicine") bullet that will alter his DNA in order to relieve him of his mega-playboy qualities, thus preventing the overpopulation problem from ever happening. She can then return to the future to receive the reward that will allow her to finally get the "nice husband, cute pet, and sweet, sweet home" she yearns for. She confirms Junta's identity, then, to his shock, promptly shoots him.

Junta, the boy who could not look at a naked woman without throwing up, was destined to become the original Mega-Playboy later in his life. Escaping back to her time machine, Karin arrives to a message from her boss in the future. Her hopes for a commendation on a job well done are dashed when her rather upset employer points out that the DCM bullet she was supposed to use on the Mega-Playboy was left behind in the future. By shooting Junta with the wrong DCM bullet—one which Karin planned on using to create an ideal husband—rather than eliminating the Mega-Playboy, Karin actually created him. Now unable to return to the future until she sets things right, Karin decides to improvise by making Junta get together with the only girl who does not give him an allergic reaction: his childhood friend Ami Kurimoto, for whom he does not feel any romantic affection, since he sees her more as a sister.

== Characters ==
Junta Momonari (桃生 純太, Momonari Junta)
Voiced by: Keiichi Nanba (Japanese); Liam O'Brien (English)
A high school boy with a peculiar allergy to girls: he vomits when sexually aroused. He gains the ability to transform into the Mega-Playboy, practically at will, after being shot by Karin's first DCM bullet. However, each time he transforms, his Mega-Playboy DNA stabilizes more and more.
Karin Aoi (葵 かりん, Aoi Karin)
Voiced by: Miina Tominaga (Japanese); Jessica Calvello (English)
A sixteen-year-old DNA Operator from the overcrowded future, sent back in time in order to prevent the advent of the Mega-Playboy using DCM, however she brings back the wrong bullet from the future which accelerates Junta in becoming the Mega-Playboy. All she wants out of life is a nice husband, a cute pet, and a sweet home, but when she met Junta, she falls in love with him–at first because of his Mega-Playboy powers, and finally because of him as a person.
Ami Kurimoto (栗本 亜美, Kurimoto Ami)
Voiced by: Hiroko Kasahara (Japanese); Rachael Lillis (English)
Junta's childhood friend and schoolmate, and, except for two instances, the only girl who doesn't bring about an allergic reaction in him. She is also the only girl immune to the Mega-Playboy's ability to seduce women, something Karin considers a key part in the plan to stop the Mega-Playboy. If Junta and Ami stay together, she can nullify the Mega-Playboy's charms and the future won't be overcrowded.
Tomoko Saeki (佐伯 倫子, Saeki Tomoko)
Voiced by: Megumi Hayashibara (Japanese); Veronica Lake (English)
One of the most popular and beautiful girls in Junta's school, and the ex-girlfriend of Ryuji. She falls in love with Junta because of his Mega-Playboy powers. Apart from this, she's a quite lonely girl; her mother died and her father works abroad.
Ryuji Sugashita (菅下 竜二, Sugashita Ryūji)
Voiced by: Takehito Koyasu (Japanese); Dan Green (English)
Tomoko's wealthy and possessive ex-boyfriend. Swears vengeance against Junta. Later gains powers that rival those of the Mega-Playboy after being accidentally shot by a second DCM bullet.
Kotomi Takanashi (高梨 ことみ, Takanashi Kotomi)
Voiced by: Hekiru Shiina (Japanese); Lotus (English)
A friend and classmate of Ami's who has an embarrassing problem similar to Junta's allergy: she farts whenever she gets nervous. Kotomi develops a crush on Junta due to his Mega-Playboy DNA. She and Junta spend some time together trying to help cure each other of their problems. She's very talented in gymnastics.
Yokomori (横森)
Voiced by: Ryūsuke Ōbayashi (Japanese); Tristan Goddard (English)
Karin's boss from the future.
Oharu (おはる)
Voiced by: Eiko Yamada (Japanese); Barry Banner (English)
The AI of Karin's time traveling ship.
Lulara Kawasaki (川崎 るらら, Kawasaki Rurara)
Voiced by: Sakiko Tamagawa (Japanese); Rebecca Miriam (English)
The Mega-Playboy's youngest daughter and Junta's 101st child. In the anime, she is Junta's great-granddaughter.
Mori (森)
Voiced by: Jun Hazumi (Japanese); David Brimmer (English)
A government official from the future who wishes to use the Mega-Playboy and his descendants for his own purposes.
Kakimaro Someya (染屋 垣麿, Someya Kakimaro)
Voiced by: Mitsuo Iwata (Japanese); Tom Wayland (English)
A friend of Junta who often pokes fun at Junta's bad luck with girls.
Ichigo Ichikawa (市川 一期, Ichikawa Ichigo)
Voiced by: Hidehiro Kikuchi (Japanese); Jake Eisbart (English)
Another one of Junta's friends.
Chiyo Momonari (桃生 チヨ, Momonari Chiyo)
Voiced by: Hiroko Maruyama (Japanese); Lynna Dunham (English)
Junta's mother, she has raised him alone after being widowed. A kind woman, if somewhat of a meddler and tattletale sometimes.
Mako Iwasaki (岩崎 魔子, Iwasaki Mako)
Competitor with Kotomi in gymnastics, tried to remove her competition with the help of her brother, a psychic interested in Junta's psychic soldier abilities.

== Media ==
=== Manga ===
Written and illustrated by Masakazu Katsura, DNA² was serialized in Shueisha's shōnen manga magazine Weekly Shōnen Jump from August 23, 1993, to July 4, 1994. Shueisha collected its 42 chapters in five tankōbon volumes, released from December 2, 1993, to February 3, 1995.

==== Volumes ====
No.	Release date	ISBN
1	December 2, 1993	4-08-871756-2
Karin Aoi is tasked to travel to the past in order to solve the world's overpopulation problem. The origin of the problem is Junta Momonari whose genes makes him an extreme womanizer dubbed as Mega Playboy (メガプレイボーイ, Mega Pureibōi); his genes are passed down to his a hundred descendants which causes a chain reaction. Karin shoots Junta with a DNA modifier which causes the Mega Playboy genes to awaken. Out of DNA modifiers, Karin decides to set Junta up with Ami Kurimoto, his childhood friend who is resistant to the Mega Playboy genes, in order to promote monogamy and destroy the Mega Playboy persona. Junta's Mega Playboy garners the love of Tomoko Saeki; in Envy, Ryuji Sugashita hires people to attack Junta. After his friends are hurt, Junta's Mega Playboy persona takes over and dispatches his attackers with psychic attacks.
2	April 4, 1994	4-08-871757-0
Karin receives a new DNA modifier and attempts to shoot Junta, only to miss and hit Ryuji who discovers he has gained the ability to absorb other people's DNA into himself. Using his powers, he morphs into Junta and ruins his reputation with Ami and Tomoko. Afterwards, Ryuji absorbs Junta's powers and defeats him. Ami suggests Junta to learn how to use the Mega Playboy's powers while in his regular mindset in order to defeat Ryuji.
3	July 4, 1994	4-08-871758-9
Ryuji gathers the school's females in order to publicly humiliate Junta in battle to win Tomoko's affection. Junta gains an early advantage, until Ryuji awakens his psychic abilities. Overwhelmed, Junta's Mega Playboy persona takes over and achieves victory. Ryuji gains a change of heart and expresses regret in his actions before being taken to the hospital.
4	October 4, 1994	4-08-871759-7
Karin explains the Mega Playboy persona to Ami in order to convince her to her plan. Ami's friend, Kotomi Takanashi, wants to ask Junta on a date but whenever she is nervous, she farts. Junta, with the Mega Playboy's influence, decides to help her overcome her problem. Junta's actions garner the attention of a psychic user who wants to compare his abilities to Junta's.
5	February 3, 1995	4-08-871760-0
The psychic user sabotages Kotomi's performance to antagonist Junta; He is easily defeated by Junta. Later Mori, a corrupt government employee from an alternate future, travels to the present. He has taken control of Junta's one-hundred descendants except for the 101st child; the 101st child is Junta and Karin's child, is the strongest among his siblings, and the only good child who actively opposes Mori's reign. Mori forces Junta's Mega Playboy personality to become dominant; the personality is later overcome by Junta. As a result, Mori's plan falls apart and he commits suicide. Karin decides to go on a date with Junta. She asks him who he likes, he replies her and Ami. In response, Karin shoots Junta with a DNA modifier, erases his memories about her, and returns to the future.

=== Anime ===
A 12-episode anime television series adaptation, produced by Madhouse and Studio Deen, and directed by Jun'ichi Sakata, was broadcast on Nippon TV from October 7 to December 23, 1994. L'Arc-en-Ciel performed the opening theme "Blurry Eyes", while Sharam Q performed the ending theme "Single Bed" (シングルベッド, Shinguru Beddo). Three original video animation (OVA) episodes were released from February 21 to June 25, 1995. The entire series was re-released on DVD and Blu-ray Disc sets on January 29, 2014.

In North America, the series was first licensed by Central Park Media. They released the 12 episodes and the three OVA episodes on five DVDs from February 11 to October 14, 2003. Following CPM's bankruptcy in April 2009, the series was acquired by Discotek Media in 2013, and released on a single DVD set on June 24, 2014. The series has been streamed by Viewster and Crunchyroll.

In Southeast Asia, the series was broadcast on Animax Asia.

==== Episodes ====
No.	Title	Original release date
1	"The Girl from the Future -Karin"; Transliteration: "Mirai Kara Kita Shōjo Karin" (Japanese: 未来からの少女 かりん)	October 7, 1994
Junta sits in the living room of his schoolmate, a girl named Tomoko. When she comes on to him strongly his allergy flares up and he pukes, causing him to be kicked out. The day after Junta meets a blue haired girl named Karin. While they are sitting in a restaurant she explains that she comes from the future, is a DNA Operator, and has arrived to prevent him becoming the 'Mega-Playboy'. Karin then shoots him with the DCM bullet. When Karin goes back to her time machine, she learns she used the wrong bullet and actually caused Junta to become the Mega-Playboy in the first place.
2	"Mega-playboy is Born! -Junta"; Transliteration: "Megapure Tanjō! Junta" (Japanese: メガプレ誕生! 純太)	October 14, 1994
Junta is delighted that he can now talk to a girl normally and has already charmed Tomoko with his Mega-playboy power. A girl named Kotomi tells her friend Ami, Junta's childhood friend, that Junta is being friendly with another girl. Meanwhile Ryūji, Tomoko's former boyfriend, gets a bunch of thugs to attack her and Junta.
3	"On the Night of the Festival -Ami"; Transliteration: "Matsuri no Yoru ni Ami" (Japanese: 祭りの夜に 亜美)	October 21, 1994
Karin realizes there is a bond between Junta and Ami and decides that if she could hook them together it would be helpful for her mission. However for some reason Junta's Mega-playboy persona does not work on Ami.
4	"Who Gets the Necklace? -Tomoko"; Transliteration: "Nekkuresu wa dare ni? Tomoko" (Japanese: ネックレスは誰に? 倫子)	October 28, 1994
When Junta asks Ami about what type of present he should get a girl he likes, she tells him to get a necklace, When he is at the mall buying the necklace he runs into Tomoko.
5	"Don't Tell a Soul! -Kotomi"; Transliteration: "Darenimo Ienai! Kotomi" (Japanese: 誰にも言えない! ことみ)	November 4, 1994
Kotomi tells her friend Ami that she is lovesick. Ami asks what class the boy is in, and Kotomi says that he is sitting in a particular seat in Class C. Ami realizes that this is Junta's class and feels concerned. Later, while in a restaurant, Kotomi embarrasses herself in front of Junta and Ami and runs out crying.
6	"What Did Junta Do to Kotomi?"; Transliteration: "Junta wa Kotomi ni nani wo shita?" (Japanese: 純太はことみに何をした?)	November 11, 1994
Ami runs after Kotomi and is tracked by Junta and Karin. Later Ami explains Kotomi's problem, she farts when she gets excited or nervous. When Junta finds Kotomi, they stroll about the hotel district, and Junta then tells Kotomi that he'll help cure her. Meanwhile, Karin looks frantically for them in the local love-hotels.
7	"I Want to Give You All That I Have!"; Transliteration: "Watashi no Subete o Agetai no!" (Japanese: 私のすべてを あげたいの!)	November 18, 1994
Kotomi is still interested in Junta, Ami tells Karin that Junta has to date Kotomi now that she has told him her feelings. Junta and Kotomi spend time together at the gym trying to cure each other of their problems. Kotomi tries to seduce Junta which causes the Mega-playboy persona to reappear.
8	"You've Always Been at My Side"; Transliteration: "Zutto Anata ga Soba Ni Ita" (Japanese: ずっとあなたがそばにいた)	November 25, 1994
Mega-Playboy Junta tells Kotomi that she does not have to change and that she is fine just the way she is. Kotomi realizes that Junta was never serious about going out with her. She tells Ami that she has broken up with Junta and that Ami should not hold back for her sake. Meanwhile, Karin has received the correct DCM bullet from the future.
9	"The Shot to Ryuuji's Heart..."; Transliteration: "Sono Dangan wa Ryūji no Mune ni.." (Japanese: その弾丸は 竜二の胸に…)	December 2, 1994
Karin's boss, Yokomori, warns her that they've run out of budget and this is the last bullet she'll get. Karin sends a note to Junta to meet her on the school roof, she intends to snipe him from an adjacent building. Tomoko and Ryūji are already on the roof arguing. When Junta appears the situation gets complicated and ends with Karin accidentally shooting Ryūji.
10	"Dangerous Ryūji's Dangerous Power"; Transliteration: "Abunai Ryūji no Abunai Nōryoku" (Japanese: アブナイ竜二の危ない能力)	December 9, 1994
As a result of being shot with DCM bullet Ryūji has gained the power to absorb other people DNA and morph into them. He uses this to get revenge on Junta by ruining his reputation with Ami and Tomoko.
11	"Don't Turn Into the Mega-Playboy!"; Transliteration: "Megapure ni Naccha Dame!!" (Japanese: メガプレになっちゃダメ!!)	December 16, 1994
Junta believes the only way he can defeat Ryūji is by transforming into Mega-Playboy however Karin is opposed to it because the change might be permanent. Karin tries to fight Ryūji herself but when Junta and Ami arrive she has already been beaten.
12	"Bye-bye Mega-Playboy"; Transliteration: "Baibai Megapureibōi" (Japanese: バイバイメガプレイボーイ)	December 23, 1994
After a tough fight Junta at last defeats Ryūji by transforming into Mega-Playboy. Karin believes that as long as Ami stays with Junta, he will never turn into the Mega-Playboy again. Karin flies off in her time ship only to return shortly afterwards saying her mission got extended.
OVA–1	"Another Time Machine"; Transliteration: "Mō Hitotsu no Taimumashin" (Japanese: もう一つのタイムマシン)	February 21, 1995
At Junta's house, Karin sings karaoke and gets so drunk she needs to be carried back to her ship and put to bed. Another time ship appears, carrying a girl named Lulara Kawasaki and a man named Mori.
OVA–2	"The Thing Forgotten a Century from Now"; Transliteration: "Hyaku-nen Go no Wasuremono" (Japanese: 100年後の忘れもの)	April 25, 1995
Lulara says that Junta is her ancestor and she has come there to finish the job that Karin could not. Mori tells Karin he does not want to eliminate the Mega-Playboy, and that he synthesized the DCM bullet she shot Ryūji with. Karin analyzes the bullet and finds out it would not only permanently lock Junta's DNA as the Mega-Playboy's, but would allow Junta and all of his descendants to be controlled by high-frequency gamma waves. Junta and Ami try to escape Lulara but she easily catches them and shoots Junta.
OVA–3	"I'll Never Forget You"; Transliteration: "Boku wa Anata o Wasurenai" (Japanese: ぼくはあなたを忘れない)	June 25, 1995
Now controlled by Mori, Junta attacks Karin, however he is not under complete control and regains control of himself. Mori is taken in by the time police, Lulara and Ryūji are free of charges given that they were not responsible for their actions. Karin shoots Junta with the correct DCM bullet and says the Mega-Playboy is now completely gone and that Junta will forget everything about Karin's visit. She then returns to the future.
