= Snow Drop (song) =

Single by L'Arc-en-Ciel

from the album Ray
- Released: October 7, 1998
- Genre: Pop rock, alternative rock
- Label: Ki/oon Records
- Songwriters: Hyde, Tetsu
- Producers: L'Arc-en-Ciel, Hajime Okano

L'Arc-en-Ciel singles chronology
"Honey" (1998)	"Snow Drop" (1998)	"Forbidden Lover" (1998)

"Snow Drop" is the fourteenth single by L'Arc-en-Ciel, released on October 7, 1998 it debuted at number 1 on the Oricon chart. The single was re-released on August 30, 2006. The song was used as the theme song to the TV drama Hashire Kōmuin!.

== Cover versions ==
The American R&B group Boyz II Men recorded an English language cover of the song for L'Arc-en-Ciel's 2012 tribute album.

== Track listing ==
#	Title	Length	Lyrics	Music
1	"Snow Drop"	4:35	Hyde	Tetsu
2	"A Swell in the Sun"	4:42	Hyde	Yukihiro
3	"Snow Drop (Hydeless Version)"	4:21	‐	Tetsu
