= Forbidden Lover (song) =

Single by L'Arc-en-Ciel

from the album Ark
- Released: October 14, 1998
- Genre: Alternative rock
- Label: Ki/oon Records
- Songwriter(s): Hyde, Ken
- Producer(s): L'Arc-en-Ciel, Hajime Okano

L'Arc-en-Ciel singles chronology
"Snow Drop" (1998)	"Forbidden Lover" (1998)	"Heaven's Drive" (1999)

"Forbidden Lover" is the fifteenth single by L'Arc-en-Ciel, released on October 14, 1998. It debuted at number 1 on the Oricon chart (replacing their previous single, "Snow Drop"), selling over 509,000 copies in the initial week of the release. The single was re-released on August 30, 2006.

== Track listing ==
#	Title	Lyrics	Music
1	"Forbidden Lover"	Hyde	Ken
2	"Kasou -1014 Mix-" (花葬, Flower Burial)	Hyde	Ken*
3	"Forbidden Lover (Hydeless Version)"	‐	Ken

* Remix by Yukihiro.
