= Dune (L'Arc-en-Ciel album) =

Studio album by L'Arc-en-Ciel
- Released: April 10, 1993 (limited); April 27, 1993 (regular); April 5, 2000 (regular reissue); April 21, 2004 (anniversary); May 30, 2023 (2023 remaster)
- Genre: Post-punk
- Length: 47:41 (limited); 51:25 (regular); 67:58 (anniversary); 68:00 (2023 remaster)
- Label: Danger Crue

L'Arc-en-Ciel chronology
| Dune (1993) | Tierra (1994) |

Alternative cover
- Cover of the 10th anniversary edition

Singles from Dune
- 1. "Floods of Tears" Released: August 17, 1993

Dune is the debut album by Japanese rock band L'Arc-en-Ciel. It was released by the independent label Danger Crue Records, first in a limited edition on April 10, 1993, and followed by a regular edition on April 27, which contained an additional tenth track. The regular edition reached number 1 on the Oricon indies chart on May 10.

A 10th anniversary edition of Dune was released on April 21, 2004. It was remastered and contains three bonus tracks. It debuted at number 5 on the Oricon Albums Chart.

== Overview ==
A recording of "Floods of Tears" was previously released as a single on November 25, 1992. The version of the song included on the album is different and does not feature original drummer Pero. The band previously contributed "Voice" to the 1992 omnibus album Gimmick, featuring Pero as well.

"Shutting from the Sky" was originally titled "Claustro Phobia". Although the album version is credited to the band, former guitarist Hiro originally composed the track. "Dune" was originally called "Call for Me", and was later re-recorded by the band's Punk~en~Ciel alter-ego for 2008's "Drink It Down". "Tsuioku no Joukei" was previously titled "Call to Mind" and originally composed by Hiro, although the album version is credited to the band.

To promote the album, music videos for "Dune" and "As if in a Dream" were created. Although a live performance of "Claustro Phobia" was earlier included on the band's self-titled and freely distributed first home video in 1992.

== Track listing ==
All lyrics are written by hyde

| No. | Title | Music | Length |
|---|---|---|---|
| 1. | "Shutting from the Sky" | L'Arc-en-Ciel | 5:34 |
| 2. | "Voice" | ken | 4:53 |
| 3. | "Taste of Love" | ken | 5:00 |
| 4. | "Entichers" | hyde | 4:19 |
| 5. | "Floods of Tears" | tetsu | 6:12 |
| 6. | "Dune" | tetsu | 5:06 |
| 7. | "Be Destined" | ken | 4:25 |
| 8. | "Tsuioku no Joukei" (追憶の情景) | L'Arc-en-Ciel | 6:18 |
| 9. | "As if in a Dream" | ken | 5:32 |
| 10. | "Ushinawareta Nagame" (失われた眺め) | ken | 3:38 |

10th anniversary edition
| No. | Title | Music | Length |
|---|---|---|---|
| 11. | "Floods of Tears (Single Version)" (rec. in March 1992) | tetsu | 5:45 |
| 12. | "Yasouka" (夜想花, rec. in June 1992) | ken | 5:32 |
| 13. | "Yokan" (予感, rec. in May 1993) | ken | 5:37 |

== Personnel ==
- hyde – vocals
- ken – guitar
- tetsu – bass guitar, backing vocals
- sakura – drums
- pero – drums on tracks 11 and 12
- Kenji Shimizu – keyboard on tracks 11 and 12

== Charts ==
| Chart (2004) | Peak position |
|---|---|
| Japanese Albums (Oricon) | 5 |
