= Heart (L'Arc-en-Ciel album) =

Studio album by L'Arc-en-Ciel
- Released: February 25, 1998
- Genre: Alternative rock; pop rock
- Length: 48:38
- Label: Ki/oon
- Producer: L'Arc-en-Ciel; Hajime Okano; Chieko Nakayama

L'Arc-en-Ciel chronology
True (1996)	Heart (1998)	Ark (1999)

Singles from Heart
- 1. "Niji" Released: October 17, 1997; 2. "Winter Fall" Released: January 28, 1998

Heart is the fifth album by L'Arc-en-Ciel, released on February 25, 1998. It is the band's first album with yukihiro on drums and marked the band's return to mainstream attention following the arrest of the former drummer sakura. It reached number one on the Oricon chart and sold over a million copies, being certified by the RIAJ.

The first single to be released from this album was "Niji".

== Track listing ==
All lyrics are written by hyde, except track 9 by tetsu.

No.	Title	Music	Length
1.	"Loreley"	hyde	5:58
2.	"Winter Fall"	ken	4:53
3.	"Singin' in the Rain"	hyde	4:34
4.	"Shout at the Devil"	ken	3:57
5.	"Niji (Album Version)" (虹)	ken	5:07
6.	"Birth!"	hyde	4:16
7.	"Promised Land"	ken	4:29
8.	"Fate"	ken	5:41
9.	"Milky Way"	tetsu	4:28
10.	"Anata" (あなた)	tetsu	5:15

== Personnel ==
- hyde – vocals, alto sax on track 1, "master devil" on track 7
- ken – guitar, autoharp on track 1, tambourine on tracks 5 and 10
- tetsu – bass guitar
- yukihiro – drums, industrial noise on track 1, metal percussion on tracks 4 and 7
- Hajime Okano – keyboards on tracks 1, 6 and 7, ARP 2600 on track 8
- Hitoshi Saitou – keyboards on track 1
- Shinri Sasaki – piano on track 2
- Chieko Kanehara – strings on tracks 2 and 10
- Shirou Sasaki – horns on track 2
- Chinpaul Gorichie – female chorus on track 2
- Hal-Oh Togashi – keyboards on track 3
- Kyoya Kimura – "devil's voice" on track 7
- Chinpaul Gilbert – "grand master devil" on track 7, 12-string guitar on track 9

== Charts ==
=== Weekly charts ===
Chart (1998)	Peak position
Japanese Albums (Oricon)	1

=== Year-end charts ===
Chart (1998)	Position
Japanese Albums (Oricon)	15

== Certifications ==
Region	Certification	Certified units/sales
Japan (RIAJ)	4× Platinum	1,600,000^{^}
^{^} Shipments figures based on certification alone.
