= Stay Away (L'Arc-en-Ciel song) =

Single by Japanese rock band L'Arc-en-Ciel

Single by L'Arc-en-Ciel

from the album Real
- Released: July 19, 2000
- Genre: Alternative rock
- Label: Ki/oon Records
- Songwriters: Hyde, Tetsu
- Producers: L'Arc-en-Ciel, Hajime Okano

L'Arc-en-Ciel singles chronology
"Neo Universe / Finale" (2000)	"Stay Away" (2000)	"Spirit Dreams Inside (Another Dream)" (2001)

"Stay Away" is the 21st single by Japanese rock band L'Arc-en-Ciel, released on July 19, 2000. On the same day, Japanese rock band Glay's single "Mermaid" was also released. Although "Stay Away" sold over 504,000 copies in the first week, "Mermaid" debuted at number 1 with the sales of over 525,000 copies. The second track "Get out from the Shell" is also included in their album Real as the English-language song "Get out from the Shell (Asian version)". "Stay Away" was elected as "the best video of the year" at the "Space Shower Music Video Awards 00".

Canadian singer-songwriter Daniel Powter also performed a cover version in English as part of the 2012 album Tribute by L'Arc-en-Ciel.

== Track listing ==
#	Title	Lyrics	Music
1	"Stay Away"	Hyde	Tetsu
2	"Get out from the Shell"	Hyde	Yukihiro
3	"Stay Away -Jaze Poo Mix-"	Hyde	Tetsu*
4	"Stay Away -Truly Barbie Forest Ver.-"	‐	Tetsu

* Remix by TT man.
