= Tierra (L'Arc-en-Ciel album) =

Studio album by L'Arc-en-Ciel
- Released: July 14, 1994
- Genre: Post-punk
- Length: 52:03
- Label: Ki/oon
- Producer: L'Arc-en-Ciel

L'Arc-en-Ciel chronology
Dune (1993)	Tierra (1994)	Heavenly (1995)

Singles from Tierra
- 1. "Blurry Eyes" Released: October 21, 1994

Tierra is the second studio album by L'Arc-en-Ciel, released on July 14, 1994.

It debuted at number 7 on the Oricon Albums Chart. It was later certified platinum by the RIAJ in 1998, selling 400,000 copies.

== Track listing ==
All lyrics are written by hyde.

No.	Title	Music	Length
1.	"In the Air"	hyde	4:51
2.	"All Dead"	hyde	4:17
3.	"Blame"	tetsu	5:11
4.	"Wind of Gold"	ken	4:29
5.	"Blurry Eyes"	tetsu	4:20
6.	"Inner Core"	sakura	5:31
7.	"Nemuri ni Yosete" (眠りによせて)	ken	5:15
8.	"Kaze no Yukue" (風の行方)	ken	5:24
9.	"Hitomi ni Utsuru Mono" (瞳に映るもの)	ken	4:47
10.	"White Feathers"	ken	7:58

== Personnel ==
- hyde – vocals
- ken – guitar
- tetsu – bass guitar
- sakura – drums, percussion
- Haruo Togashi – keyboards
- Kuni Tanaka – saxophone

== Charts ==
Chart (1994)	Peak position
Japanese Albums (Oricon)	7

== Certifications ==
Region	Certification	Certified units/sales
Japan (RIAJ)	Platinum	400,000^{^}
^{^} Shipments figures based on certification alone.
