= Heavenly (L'Arc-en-Ciel album) =

Studio album by L'Arc-en-Ciel
- Released: September 1, 1995
- Genres: Alternative rock; pop rock
- Length: 46:44
- Label: Ki/oon
- Producer: L'Arc-en-Ciel

L'Arc-en-Ciel chronology
Tierra (1994)	Heavenly (1995)	True (1996)

Singles from Heavenly
- 1. "Vivid Colors" Released: July 06, 1995; 2. "Natsu no Yuu-utsu (Time to Say Good-bye)" Released: October 20, 1995

Heavenly is the third album by L'Arc-en-Ciel, released on September 1, 1995.

It debuted at number 3 on the Oricon Albums Chart. It was later certified platinum by the RIAJ in 1998, selling 400,000 copies.

== Background ==
In their previous album, Tierra, they spent about half a year recording the album, but this time they reportedly decided to allow more time for pre-production in an effort to shorten the recording period. One reason behind this change was that the lengthy production of the previous album left them with little opportunity to promote the album’s release or announce their live performances. As a result, during some of the shows on their live tour “Tour Sense of time ’94,” which began in July 1994, tickets failed to sell out. Looking back on the recording process, Tetsuya explained in an interview around the time of the album’s release:

A lesson we learned from Tierra was that we spent a huge amount of time—about six months—on recording. That meant we couldn't carry out promotions the way we wanted. With that in mind, we spent time from around the end of last year building a foundation that would allow us to operate more effectively. So, for this album, we decided that the members would come up with a solid plan before entering the studio and then stick to it

Furthermore, following their major label debut in 1994, there were instances where decisions regarding their activities were made without the members' knowledge; consequently, around the end of that year, the four members gathered privately to hold a meeting and determine their future course of action. Reflecting on the meeting, Sakura recalled, "As the year-end approached, the four of us went to Denny's, discussed what to do for the coming year, and wrote out a schedule," while Tetsuya stated, "We decided, 'We aren't puppets—let's make our own decisions!'" As a result of the meeting, the four decided that, given that they hadn't been able to perform many live shows in 1994, they would shift their focus to live performances in 1995.

In a 2006 conversation with Sakura for a music magazine feature, Tetsuya reflected on that era, stating, "I think the fundamental core of our approach to music and being in a band was established around '94 or '95. It really connects to what we do now—the things we take for granted today, whether it's songwriting, touring, or performing live; those were all established back then." Similarly, in a 2012 television interview, Hyde looked back on that time, remarking, "If we hadn't taken the initiative and led our own activities, I think the band probably would have ended. I don't think that aspect has changed—even though we've all gained experience and matured."

== Development and production ==
Preparations for the production of the album *heavenly* began in late 1994, with full-scale recording—conducted in a "retreat" style—starting in March 1995. The recording process concluded just before the "in CLUB '95" concert tour, which began in May 1995.

With the exception of "Vivid Colors," the four band members handled all production and arrangement duties for the tracks on Heavenly (Akira Nishihira participated as a co-arranger for "Vivid Colors"). Furthermore, while numerous keyboardists participated in the recording of the previous album, Tierra, (Note: For the production of Tierra, released in 1994 , keyboardist Yasuyuki Honda ( ex. GRASS VALLEY ) was in charge of directing the basic sound. In addition, Hideki Matsutake, Itaru Sakoda, and Tetsuo Ishikawa participated as keyboard operators.) this time—again excluding "Vivid Colors"—Takayuki Hatano, who serves as the band's live support keyboardist, handled all keyboard recording. Regarding the arrangement process, Hyde stated, "It was completely different from last time, right from the songwriting stage. You could really feel everyone's momentum. Last time, we’d take what emerged, add [new] ideas, and only once we started recording would we wonder, 'What kind of atmosphere will this have?' This time, we were heavily involved in arranging together from the very beginning of the songwriting process. I could sense the depth of everyone's musicality at that stage... it really feels like a band effort. This is the first release where we were finally able to fully demonstrate the members' arranging capabilities." He added, "People might ask, 'Was it different before?'... but I think this one is outstandingly 'band-like'." Ken also reflected on the production, noting, "A key feature [this time] was that the vocal melodies were clear from an early stage. It was also good that the four of us took the time to nail down the finer details of the songs. I think we collaborated much more closely on that front than we did for Tierra. With Heavenly, we were conscious of how the different parts could intertwine."

Musically, Heavenly—like its predecessor Tierra—includes tracks rooted in the gothic and new wave genres favored by the band members. However, the production process involved experimenting with a wider range of musical genres than before; the album features a psychedelic track inspired by the late-1960s flower power movement, (Note: This refers to "and She Said," the third track on this album.) a song exploring the fusion of hard rock and jazz, (Note: This refers to "Secret Signs," the fifth track on this album.) a track with a blue-eyed soul vibe, (Note: This refers to "C'est La Vie," the sixth track on this album.) and songs incorporating elements of 1970s and 80s folk music. (Note: This refers to "Natsu no Yuu-utsu," the seventh track on this album.) Reflecting on his approach to composition for Heavenly at the time of its release, Ken said, "For these songs, it was more about having fun and letting them emerge while I was just casually strumming the guitar—rather than sitting down specifically to write songs for an album." Notably, Ken mentioned that this recording marked the first time he adopted a keyboard-centered songwriting method. Regarding the background of this approach, he explained in an interview at the time: "Sometimes I write without a guitar now. In the past, I couldn't write a song unless I had a guitar in my hands, but lately, I might get inspired by a landscape and have the song take shape in my head. 'The Rain Leaves a Scar' is a track I composed entirely on the keyboard from the start. I had used the keyboard for 'Hitomi ni Utsuru Mono' on the *Tierra* album as well, but that involved creating the backing and melody on guitar alongside the keyboard; 'The Rain Leaves a Scar' was the first one I wrote exclusively on the keyboard." He added, "I feel like songs written on the keyboard allow me to hear the 'vocals' more clearly. They give rise to chord progressions I wouldn't come up with on the guitar. I love tension chords, and the keyboard is convenient because there are fewer constraints when incorporating them compared to the guitar."

== Track listing ==
All lyrics are written by hyde.

No.	Title	Music	Length
1.	"Still I'm with You"	ken	4:14
2.	"Vivid Colors"	ken	4:46
3.	"And She Said"	hyde	4:43
4.	"Garasu Dama" (ガラス玉)	ken	5:06
5.	"Secret Signs"	ken	3:37
6.	"C'est la Vie"	tetsu	4:05
7.	"Natsu no Yuu-utsu" (夏の憂鬱)	ken	4:13
8.	"Cureless"	tetsu	4:52
9.	"Shizuka no Umi de" (静かの海で)	L'Arc-en-Ciel	7:14
10.	"The Rain Leaves a Scar"	ken	3:53

== Personnel ==
- hyde – vocals
- ken – guitar
- tetsu – bass guitar
- sakura – drums, percussion
- Takeshi Hadano – keyboards
- Akira Nishidaira – keyboards on track 2
- Jonathan E. Miles – voice on track 9

== Charts ==
Chart (1995)	Peak position
Japanese Albums (Oricon)	3

== Certifications ==
Region	Certification	Certified units/sales
Japan (RIAJ)	Platinum	400,000^{^}
^{^} Shipments figures based on certification alone.
