= Lies and Truth =

Single by L'Arc-en-Ciel

from the album True
- Released: November 21, 1996
- Genre: Alternative rock
- Length: 5:52
- Label: Ki/oon Sony Records
- Songwriter(s): Hyde, Ken
- Producer(s): L'Arc-en-Ciel, Akira Nishihira, Takeyuki Hatano

L'Arc-en-Ciel singles chronology
"Flower" (1996)	"Lies and Truth" (1996)	"Niji" (1997)

"Lies and Truth" is the seventh single by L'Arc-en-Ciel, released on November 21, 1996 it reached number 6 on the Oricon chart. The single was re-released on August 30, 2006.

== Track listing ==
#	Title	Lyrics	Music
1	"Lies and Truth"	Hyde	Ken
2	"Sai wa Nagerareta (賽は投げられた, The Die was Cast)	Hyde	Ken
3	"Lies and Truth (Hydeless Version)"	‐	Ken

== Chart positions ==
Chart (1996)	Peak position
Japan Oricon	6
