= Die in Cries =

Japanese visual kei rock band

- Origin: Yokohama, Japan
- Genres: Alternative rock; pop rock
- Years active: 1991–1995
- Label: BMG Japan
- Past members: Kyo; Shin Murohime; Takashi Kaneuchi; Yukihiro

Die in Cries (stylized as DIE IN CRIES) was a Japanese visual kei rock band of the 1990s, whose members have all played in other prominent bands.

== History ==
Formed in 1991, Die in Cries was composed of Kyo (D'erlanger) on vocals, Shin (ex:Mad Capsule Markets) on guitar, Takashi (ex:The Ace) on bass, and Yukihiro (ex:Zi:Kill) on drums. Yukihiro and Shin previously played together in Optic Nerve. While they were one of the more popular visual kei bands in the 90's, international visual kei fans haven't shown the same interest as contemporaries rock bands.

Following their breakup in 1995 the members all went on to play in other bands. The most prominent and well known of these is most likely Yukihiro who was recruited to play for the popular band L'Arc-en-Ciel. Kyo, Shin and Takashi all went on to form Bug, with Shin later leaving to play for Spin and Creature Creature, solo project of Morrie of Dead End, which originally featured Tetsuya of L'Arc-en-Ciel and currently features Sakura, whom Yukihiro replaced when he joined L'Arc-en-Ciel.

== Members ==
- Vocals: Hiroshi "Kyo" Isono (ex:Saver Tiger, D'erlanger,→Solo, Bug, D'erlanger)
- Guitar: Shin Murohime (ex:The Mad Capsule Markets, Optic Nerve,→Bloody Imitation Society, Bug, Spin, Creature Creature)
- Bass: Takashi Kaneuchi (ex:The Ace,→Fame, Hybrid, Bug)
- Drums: Yukihiro (ex:Guerrilla, Zi:Kill, Optic Nerve,→L'Arc-en-Ciel, Acid Android)

== Discography ==
=== Albums ===
- Nothingness to Revolution - 1991.08.01
- Visage - 1992.03.11 Oricon Album Chart Position: No. 5
- Node - 1992.09.23 No. 14
- Eros - 1993.07.07 No. 7
- Classique Ave. no Tobenai Hato (Classique Ave.の飛べない鳩) - 1993.12.01 No. 17
- Seeds - 1995.06.21 No. 20
- Last Live「1995.7.2」 - 1995.09.21 No. 16
- Re-make - 1995.10.21 No. 70
- Thanx: Best of Die in Cries - 1997.06.21

=== Singles ===
- "Melodies" - 1992.02.05 Oricon Single Chart Position: No. 24
- "My Eyes: Boku no Hitomi yo" (MY EYES 〜僕の瞳よ〜) - 1992.09.23 No. 29
- "to you" - 1993.01.08 No. 35
- "Nocturne" - 1993.06.02 No. 34
- "Love Song" - 1993.11.21 No. 56
- "Crescent Moon" - 1994.05.21 No. 42
- "Tane" (種) - 1995.05.24 No. 46
