= Driver's High =

1999 single by L'Arc-en-Ciel

Single by L'Arc-en-Ciel

from the album Ark
- Released: August 11, 1999
- Genre: Alternative rock
- Length: 11:28
- Label: Ki/oon Records
- Songwriters: Hyde, Tetsu
- Producers: L'Arc-en-Ciel, Hajime Okano

L'Arc-en-Ciel singles chronology
| "Pieces" (1999) | "Driver's High" (1999) | "Love Flies" (1999) |

"Driver's High" is the eighteenth single by L'Arc-en-Ciel, released on August 11, 1999, it reached number 2 on the Oricon chart. The title track was used as the first opening theme for the anime adaptation of Great Teacher Onizuka. Mary's Blood recorded a heavy metal version of the song for their 2020 cover album Re>Animator. An arranged version is also featured in the video game Gekitotsu Toma L'Arc: TomaRunner vs L'Arc-en-Ciel (2000).

== Track listing ==
| # | Title | Length | Lyrics | Music |
|---|---|---|---|---|
| 1 | "Driver's Highドライバーの高" | 4:10 | Hyde | Tetsu |
| 2 | "cradle ~down to the earth mix~ re-mixed by yukihiro" | 7:18 | Hyde | Yukihiro* |

* Remix by Yukihiro.
