= Flower (L'Arc-en-Ciel song) =

Single by L'Arc-en-Ciel

from the album True
- Released: October 17, 1996
- Genre: Pop rock
- Length: 4:58
- Label: Ki/oon Sony Records
- Songwriter: Hyde
- Producers: L'Arc-en-Ciel, Takao Konishi

L'Arc-en-Ciel singles chronology
| "Kaze ni Kienaide" (1995) | "Flower" (1996) | "Lies and Truth" (1996) |

"Flower" is the sixth single by Japanese rock band L'Arc-en-Ciel, released on October 17, 1996. It reached number 5 on the Oricon chart. The single was re-released on August 30, 2006.

== Track listing ==
| # | Title | Lyrics | Music |
|---|---|---|---|
| 1 | "Flower" | Hyde | Hyde |
| 2 | "Sayonara (さようなら, Good bye)" | Hyde | Hyde |
| 3 | "Flower (Hydeless Version)" | ‐ | Hyde |

== Chart positions ==
| Chart (1996) | Peak position |
|---|---|
| Japan Oricon | 5 |
