= Vivid Colors =

Single by L'Arc-en-Ciel

from the album Heavenly
- Released: July 6, 1995
- Genre: Alternative rock, pop rock
- Length: 8:02
- Label: Ki/oon Sony Records
- Songwriters: Hyde, Ken
- Producers: L'Arc-en-Ciel, Akira Nishihira

L'Arc-en-Ciel singles chronology
"Blurry Eyes" (1994)	"Vivid Colors" (1995)	"Natsu no Yuu-utsu (Time to Say Good-bye)" (1995)

"Vivid Colors" is the third single by L'Arc-en-Ciel, released on July 6, 1995, it reached number 16 on the Oricon chart. It was re-released on August 30, 2006.

== Track listing ==
#	Title	Lyrics	Music
1	"Vivid Colors"	Hyde	Ken
2	"Brilliant Years"	Hyde	Hyde
3	"Vivid Colors (Voiceless Version)"	‐	Ken

== Chart positions ==
Chart (1995)	Peak position
Japan Oricon	16
