= Ark (L'Arc-en-Ciel album) =

Studio album by L'Arc-en-Ciel
- Released: July 1, 1999
- Genres: Pop rock; alternative rock
- Length: 53:08
- Label: Ki/oon
- Producers: L'Arc-en-Ciel, Hajime Okano

L'Arc-en-Ciel chronology
Heart (1998)	Ark (1999)	Ray (1999)

Singles from Ark
- 1. "Dive to Blue" Released: March 25, 1998; 2. "Forbidden Lover" Released: October 14, 1998; 3. "Heaven's Drive" Released: April 21, 1999; 4. "Pieces" Released: June 02, 1999; 5. "Driver's High" Released: August 11, 1999

Ark is the sixth album by L'Arc-en-Ciel, released on July 1, 1999, simultaneously with Ray. It reached number one on the Oricon chart and sold over two million copies, being certified by the RIAJ.

== Track listing ==
All lyrics are written by hyde, except track 8 by tetsu.

No.	Title	Music	Length
1.	"Forbidden Lover"	ken	6:01
2.	"Heaven's Drive"	hyde	4:15
3.	"Driver's High"	tetsu	4:10
4.	"Cradle"	yukihiro	4:56
5.	"Dive to Blue"	tetsu	5:33
6.	"Larva" (instrumental)	yukihiro	3:55
7.	"Butterfly's Sleep"	ken	5:10
8.	"Perfect Blue"	tetsu	3:48
9.	"Shinjitsu to Gensou to" (真実と幻想と)	ken	5:22
10.	"What is Love"	tetsu	4:13
11.	"Pieces (Ark Mix)"	tetsu	5:45

== Personnel ==
- hyde – vocals
- ken – guitar, keyboards on tracks 1, 4, 5, 9 and 10, tambourine on tracks 2, 5 and 10, "Hong Kong handclaps" on track 5
- tetsu – bass guitar, backing vocals, keyboards on tracks 5, 8 and 11, metal percussion and "Hong Kong handclaps" on track 5
- yukihiro – drums, turntable on track 4, "Hong Kong handclaps" on track 5
- Hajime Okano – keyboards on tracks 1, 2, 3, 4, 8, 9, 10 and 11, chromaharp on track 10
- Hitoshi Saitou – keyboards on all but track 9, piano on track 9
- Yukarie – tenor saxophone on track 2
- Smily – baritone saxophone on track 2
- Akatsuki Tada – trumpet on track 2
- Naoki Hirata – trumpet on track 2
- Eishi Yoshizawa – organ and keyboards on track 3
- Chieko Kanehara – strings on track 7
- Keiko Abe – strings on track 11

== Charts ==
=== Weekly charts ===
Original release

Chart (1999)	Peak position
Japanese Albums (Oricon)	1

15th Anniversary Edition

Chart (2006)	Peak position
Japanese Albums (Oricon)	13

=== Year-end charts ===
Chart (1999)	Position
Japanese Albums (Oricon)	5

== Certifications ==
Region	Certification	Certified units/sales
Japan (RIAJ)	2× Million	2,000,000^{^}
^{^} Shipments figures based on certification alone.
