= Dive to Blue =

Single by L'Arc-en-Ciel

from the album Ark
- Released: March 25, 1998
- Genre: Alternative rock, power pop
- Length: 5:33
- Label: Ki/oon Sony Records
- Songwriter(s): Hyde, Tetsu
- Producer(s): L'Arc-en-Ciel, Hajime Okano

L'Arc-en-Ciel singles chronology
"Winter Fall" (1998)	"Dive to Blue" (1998)	"Honey" (1998)

"Dive to Blue" is the tenth single by L'Arc-en-Ciel, released on March 25, 1998. The single topped the Oricon charts for two weeks. It was re-released on August 30, 2006.

== Track listing ==
#	Title	Lyrics	Music
1	"Dive to Blue"	Hyde	Tetsu
2	"Peeping Tom"	Hyde	Hyde
3	"Dive to Blue (Hydeless Version)"	‐	Tetsu

== Chart positions ==
Chart (1998)	Peak position
Japan Oricon	#1
