= Kaze ni Kienaide =

Single by L'Arc-en-Ciel

from the album True
- Released: July 8, 1996
- Genre: Pop rock
- Length: 4:37
- Label: Ki/oon
- Songwriter(s): Hyde, Tetsu
- Producer(s): L'Arc-en-Ciel, Masahide Sakuma

L'Arc-en-Ciel singles chronology
| "Natsu no Yuu-utsu (Time to Say Good-bye)" (1995) | "Kaze ni Kienaide" (1996) | "Flower" (1996) |

"Kaze ni Kienaide" (風にきえないで, Don't Vanish in the Wind) is the fifth single by L'Arc-en-Ciel, released on July 8, 1996 it reached number 4 on the Oricon chart. The single was re-released on August 30, 2006.

== Track listing ==
| # | Title | Lyrics | Music |
|---|---|---|---|
| 1 | "Kaze ni Kienaide" | Hyde | Tetsu |
| 2 | "I'm So Happy" | Hyde | Hyde |
| 3 | "Kaze ni Kienaide (Voiceless Version)" | ‐ | Tetsu |

== Chart positions ==
| Chart (1996) | Peak position |
|---|---|
| Japan Oricon | 4 |
