= Niji (L'Arc-en-Ciel song) =

Single by L'Arc-en-Ciel

from the album Heart
- Released: October 17, 1997
- Genre: Alternative rock
- Length: 5:07
- Label: Ki/oon Sony Records
- Songwriters: hyde, ken
- Producer: L'Arc-en-Ciel

L'Arc-en-Ciel singles chronology
"Lies and Truth" (1997)	"Niji" (1997)	"Winter Fall" (1998)

"Niji" (虹; "Rainbow") is the eighth single by Japanese rock band L'Arc-en-Ciel, released on October 17, 1997. It reached number 3 on the Oricon chart. It was their first release after Sakura's arrest and Yukihiro joining as the band's support drummer (he officially joined on January 1, 1998). The title track was used as the opening theme of the animated movie Rurouni Kenshin: Requiem for the Ishin Shishi, making them the only artist to contribute more than one song to the franchise. The single was re-released on August 30, 2006. The song is one of the band's signature songs, often played at the end of concerts.

== Cover versions ==
The American R&B group TLC recorded an English-language cover, titled "Rainbow", for L'Arc-en-Ciel's 2012 tribute album. The female heavy metal band Show-Ya released a version of the song on their 2014 cover album Glamorous Show - Japanese Legendary Rock Covers.

== Track listing ==
#	Title	Lyrics	Music
1	"Niji"	Hyde	Ken
2	"The Ghost in My Room"	Hyde	Hyde

== Chart positions ==
Chart (1997)	Peak position
Japan Oricon	#3
