= Winter Fall =

"winter fall"

Single by L'Arc-en-Ciel

from the album Heart
- Released: January 28, 1998
- Genre: Pop rock
- Length: 4:53
- Label: Ki/oon Sony Records
- Songwriters: Hyde, Ken
- Producers: L'Arc-en-Ciel, Hajime Okano

L'Arc-en-Ciel singles chronology
"Niji" (1997)	"winter fall" (1998)	"Dive to Blue" (1998)

"winter fall" (Stylized in lowercase) is the ninth single by L'Arc-en-Ciel, released on January 28, 1998. It debuted at number 1 on the Oricon chart, making it their first number-one single. The single was re-released on August 30, 2006. It was also their first single featuring drummer Yukihiro as an official member of the band.

== Track listing ==
#	Title	Lyrics	Music
1	"winter fall"	Hyde	Ken
2	"Metropolis"	Hyde	Ken
3	"winter fall (hydeless Version)"	‐	Ken

== Chart positions ==
Chart (1998)	Peak position
Japan Oricon	#1
