= Tetsuya (musician) =

Japanese musician (born 1969)

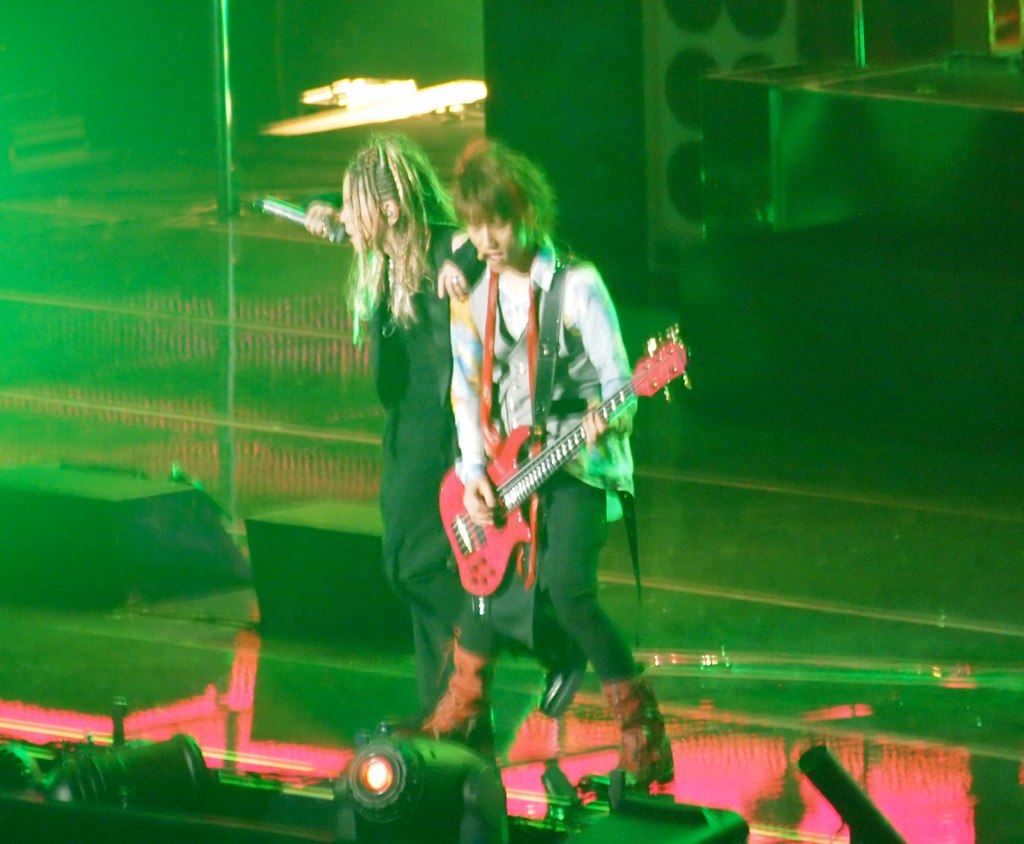
- Tetsuya (right) performing with L'Arc~en~Ciel at Madison Square Garden in 2012.

Background information
- Also known as: T.E.Z P'unk, Tetsu69, Tetsu P'unk, Dark Tetsu, Tetsu
- Born: October 3, 1969 (age 56); Hikone, Shiga, Japan
- Genres: Pop rock; alternative rock
- Occupations: Musician; singer-songwriter; record producer; fashion designer
- Instruments: Vocals; bass; keyboards; guitar
- Years active: 1989–present
- Labels: Ki/oon; Dream Machine; EMI; LDH
- Member of: L'Arc-en-Ciel
- Formerly of: Creature Creature
- Website: tetsuya.uk.com

Tetsuya (Japanese: テツヤ; born October 3, 1969), formerly known as Tetsu, is a Japanese musician, singer-songwriter, and record producer, best known as bassist and bandleader of the rock band L'Arc-en-Ciel. Formed in 1991, they have sold over 40 million records, making them one of the best-selling music artists in Japan.

Tetsuya also performs backing vocals in L'Arc-en-Ciel and has composed many of the band's songs, including "Link", "Ready Steady Go", "Finale", "Driver's High", "Stay Away", "Pieces" and "Good Luck My Way". In 2001, he started a solo career under the name Tetsu69. From 2005 to 2006, Tetsuya was a support member of Morrie's solo project Creature Creature. He formed a L'Arc-en-Ciel cover band named Like-an-Angel in 2023.

== Early life ==
Tetsuya started listening to hard rock music in his first year of junior high school, after seeing upperclassman perform at a school festival. Befriending them, the upperclassmen introduced him to bands such as Deep Purple and Rainbow. After school, Tetsuya would hang out and listen to hard rock records with his friends Ken and Maeda, both of whom were guitarists. One day, Ken suggested Tetsuya start playing bass and he readily agreed, without knowing the difference between the two instruments.

Tetsuya ended up going to a different high school than Ken and was unable to find musicians at his own school to start a band with. In his second year, he joined a band made up of musicians from a different school, which renamed themselves Bystonwell shortly after. It consisted of Tetsuya on bass, Kazuto on vocals, Kouichi on drums and Katsushi on guitar. With activities largely limited to their summer and winter breaks from school, Bystonwell entered contests and won awards, but also experienced lineup changes, with Ken joining the band as guitarist when Katsushi left. Tetsuya later estimated that they stayed together until the year after he graduated high school. Kouichi would join Billy and the Sluts, while Kazuto went on to Angè∞Graie.

== Career ==
=== L'Arc-en-Ciel ===
While searching for musicians to form a band with after Bystonwell broke up, Tetsuya agreed to play bass for a session with guitarists Taki and Fuku, drummer Pero and vocalist Hyde. As time went by, he could not think of teaming up with any other vocalist and attended every concert by Hyde's band Jelsarem's Rod, until the vocalist agreed. In February 1991, Tetsuya (then known as "Tetsu"), Hyde, Pero and guitarist Hiro formed the band L'Arc-en-Ciel. After gaining popularity in their hometown of Osaka, Hiro left the band in 1992 and Tetsuya convinced Ken to quit his university studies and join the band as their guitarist. However, Pero then left the group on December 30, 1992. The following year, Sakura joined as L'Arc-en-Ciel's new drummer.

On April 1, 1993, the band released their debut album Dune on the well-known independent record label Danger Crue Records. The album was a success and caught the attention of some major labels. In 1994, L'Arc-en-Ciel signed a contract with Sony Music Entertainment Japan's Ki/oon division and released their major debut album Tierra that same year. Their third studio album Heavenly followed in 1995. In 1996, their fourth album, True, became their first number one record on the Oricon Albums Chart and sold over a million copies. However, Sakura was arrested for drug possession in early 1997, and the band took a hiatus.

L'Arc-en-Ciel resumed activities as a trio with the October 1997 release of the single "Niji". It features former Zi:Kill and Die in Cries drummer Yukihiro as a support member. Sakura officially announced his departure from L'Arc-en-Ciel on November 4, and the band held their first concert back at the Tokyo Dome on December 23, 1997, entitled Reincarnation. It was the band's first performance at the venue and had an attendance of 56,000 people, with the tickets sold out in a record-breaking four minutes. Yukihiro officially joined L'Arc-en-Ciel as their drummer on January 1, 1998. The single "Winter Fall", which was released at the end of the month, became the group's first number one on the Oricon Singles Chart.

L'Arc-en-Ciel went on to become one of the best-selling music artists in Japan. Their 1999 simultaneously-released albums Ark and Ray are each one of the best-selling albums of all time in Japan. In 2003, L'Arc-en-Ciel were ranked number 58 on a list of the top 100 Japanese pop musicians by HMV Japan. In 2012, they became the first Japanese act to headline Madison Square Garden in New York City.

=== Solo career and other work ===
In 2001, Tetsuya started a solo career under the name "Tetsu69". His solo material was then released under the name Tetsu from 2006 to 2009. On December 1, 2009, he changed his stage name from "Tetsu" to "Tetsuya".

In 2019, Tetsuya started the fashion brand Stealth Stell'a, for which he is the creative director. He explained that he is involved in every aspect of the label and only products that he personally approves are released. A lifestyle brand called Stellage was also launched. The music equipment brand Stella Gear was launched on October 3, 2023.

On April 1, 2023, Tetsuya announced the formation of a L'Arc-en-Ciel cover band called Like-an-Angel (also written as "Like〜an〜Angel" or "Like-ən-Angel"). He explained that L'Arc-en-Ciel is only active once every few years due to the members having other projects. Because his solo activities are mostly vocal, Tetsuya said he does not have the opportunity to play bass live. "If I play L'Arc songs only once every few years, it takes time and rehabilitation to recall them. If I play in a copy band, I can smoothly get into it when L'Arc starts to move." The other members, vocalist Jekyll, Vivid guitarist Reno and Matenrou Opera drummer Hibiki, were not revealed until their first concert at Daikanyama Unit on May 30. Jekyll, who cannot speak Japanese, writes the lyrics out in rōmaji in order to memorize them. He also said he has people translate the lyrics so he can understand their meaning and therefore sing them with feeling. Guitarist Saki made her debut with the band at a Hibiya Open-Air Concert Hall concert on October 7, 2023, which also saw La'cryma Christi guitarist Hiro stand in for Reno. Like-an-Angel held their first tour between September and October 2024, with former L'Arc-en-Ciel drummer Sakura sitting in with the band for "I'm So Happy" at the final show. Their first original song, "Angel Beside You", was released on June 4, 2025.

== Equipment ==
Tetsuya is an avid collector of basses and guitars, owning over 120 basses and more than 20 guitars. In August 1992, he signed a contract with Sheldon Guitars, an ESP Guitars shop in Kita-ku, Osaka. The bassist has continued to endorse ESP for over 30 years and has several signature models with them. However, Tetsuya has also endorsed Lakland and Zon Guitars. His signature models with Lakland are the 55-69, part of their U.S.A. Series, and the SL55-69, part of their Shoreline Series. Although he has used Zon's Legacy Elite series for recording since L'Arc-en-Ciel's first album, he received his first signature model with them in 2011, the Legacy Elite 519 Tetsuya Model. Tetsuya launched his own musical equipment brand Stella Gear in 2023, but retains a relationship with ESP. He described it as how Lexus is a brand of Toyota.

Tetsuya has primarily played 5-string basses since L'Arc-en-Ciel's 15th anniversary, but is known to occasionally use 6-strings. Such as on "Neo Universe", "Time Goes On" and "Get Out of the Shell", where he plays the lead melody. On "Perfect Blue", he used a 6-string baritone guitar (an electric guitar between the range of a bass and a standard electric guitar). Tetsuya also uses a guitar/bass double neck for the song "Trust".

== Personal life ==
Tetsuya and model Sakai Ayana married in late 2007, and the couple announced in September 2014 that they had given birth to a son. On August 6, their baby girl was born, Tetsuya has revealed that Sakai has given birth to their second kid.

== Discography ==
=== Singles ===
Stage name	Title	Release date	Album
Tetsu69	"Wonderful World/Tightrope"	July 18, 2001	Suite November
Tetsu69	"Shinkirou" (蜃気楼, Shinkirō; "Mirage")	August 28, 2002	Suite November
Tetsu69	"15 1/2 Fifteen Half" (15 1/2 フィフティーンハーフ, Fifutīn Hāfu)	October 23, 2002	Suite November
Tetsu69	"White Out: Memory of a Color"	February 13, 2003	Suite November
Tetsu	"Can't Stop Believing"	March 14, 2007	Come On!
Tetsuya	"Roulette"	May 19, 2010	Come On!
Tetsuya	"Looking For Light"	August 18, 2010	Come On!
Tetsuya	"Lonely Girl"	November 10, 2010	Come On!
Tetsuya	"Make a Wish"	September 7, 2016	Stealth
Tetsuya	"Time goes on 〜泡のように〜"	September 7, 2016	Stealth
Tetsuya	"愛されんだぁ I Surrender"	June 14, 2017	Stealth
Tetsuya	"白いチューリップ"	October 10, 2021	Stealth
Tetsuya	"何があっても"	July 1, 2026	

=== EPs ===
Stage name	Title	Release date
Tetsuya	I Wanna Be With You	July 18, 2018

=== Albums ===
Stage name	Title	Release date
Tetsu69	Suite November	November 20, 2002
Tetsuya	Come On!	January 5, 2011
Tetsuya	Stealth	October 6, 2021

=== Home videos ===
Stage name	Title	Release date
Tetsuya	FIRST TOUR 2010 ルーレットを回せ! ～LIVE & DOCUMENTARY FILMS～	December 15, 2010
Tetsuya	Live Selections 2010-2012!	October 3, 2012
Tetsuya	Thank You!	July 2, 2017
Tetsuya	15th Anniversary Live	April 25, 2018
Tetsuya	Tetsuya Live 2019 Thank You 4950	August 19, 2020

=== Other releases ===
Stage name	Name	Album
Tetsu69 for Trapnest	"Reverse"	Love for Nana: Only 1 Tribute
