= Yukihiro (musician) =

Japanese musician

yukihiro
- Also known as: YUKI P'UNK
- Born: November 24, 1968 (age 57); Ichikawa, Chiba, Japan
- Genres: Alternative rock; industrial rock; punk rock; pop rock; hard rock; electronica
- Occupations: Musician; singer-songwriter; record producer
- Instruments: Vocals; drums; percussion; bass; keyboards; synthesizer; guitar
- Label: Ki/oon Records/Tracks On Drugs
- Member of: L'Arc-en-Ciel; Acid Android; Petit Brabancon
- Formerly of: Die in Cries; Zi:Kill

Yukihiro (Note: Stylized as yukihiro, and formerly as YUKIHIRO.) (born November 24, 1968, in Ichikawa, Chiba) is a Japanese musician, best known as drummer of the rock band L'Arc-en-Ciel since 1998. He also sings and plays bass for his solo project Acid Android, and drums for the supergroup Petit Brabancon. Before joining L'Arc-en-Ciel he was in the popular visual kei bands Zi:Kill and Die in Cries.

== Biography ==
=== Early life ===
Yukihiro was born on November 24, 1968, in Ichikawa, near Tokyo. His father is a company worker, and his mother is a kimono-wearing instructor. He has a younger sister.

Yukihiro has stated that he had an ordinary childhood just like other kids, never questioning his destined path of going to school, graduating from university, and ultimately becoming a white-collar salaryman. But he loved music, both Japanese and American, from heavy metal to pop. He was also a good short-track athlete in junior high school. However, he was kicked out from his athletics club for skipping daily training.

When he entered high school, he started to play the drums and immediately decided to be a professional rock musician. Once he made the decision, he told his parents that he was leaving school because it was of no use to him. His parents forbade this, thus he continued his education while devoting himself mostly to rock music.

During his university days (he left The Chiba University of Commerce), he joined Zi:Kill, one of the rising visual kei rock groups of the time.

=== 1990–1996: Zi:Kill and Die in Cries ===
Zi:Kill signed a recording contract with Toshiba EMI in 1990. However, during the recording of their major debut, there was infighting and ultimately yukihiro was fired after a show in December. He then formed a band named Optic Nerve with guitarist Shin Murohime.

In 1991, he joined former D'erlanger vocalist Kyo's band Die in Cries together with Shin, who released their debut album Nothing to Revolution that same year. They became quite popular and performed at the Nippon Budokan in 1994. Yukihiro wrote some songs for the band, but they were rejected because of their style. Some of these songs, "Trick" and "L'heure" were later recorded by L'Arc-en-Ciel in 1999.

Die in Cries broke up in 1995, with their last album Seed. For a while, yukihiro worked as a free-lance drummer. During that time, he had no home and moved around staying with friends. Tetsu stated it was so hard to catch yukihiro then, because he had no mobile phone and was always on the move.

=== 1997–present: L'Arc-en-Ciel, Acid Android and Petit Brabancon ===
When it was announced that the former L'Arc drummer Sakura left in 1997, Tetsu, the leader of the band, asked yukihiro to help record the new single. During that time, they had good chemistry. So after their first "come-back" single, "Niji", was released, they held a comeback concert with Yukihiro as support drummer. In 1998, the band announced Yukihiro as an official member with the new single "Winter Fall", followed by the album Heart. After joining L'Arc-en-Ciel, he changed the stylization of his name to all lowercase letters, to match the rest of the members' names (his name had been written in all capital letters prior).

Despite some arguments from Sakura's fans, yukihiro quickly got accepted to L'Arc. His first song, "A Swell in the Sun", was played as a prologue during their 1998 tour. L'Arc-en-Ciel quickly became one of the most popular rock bands in Japan. Their tour was sold out, the album went platinum and all seven of their singles hit the top 10 in the charts.

On July 1, 1999, they released their sixth and seventh albums Ark and Ray on the same day. The albums hit the top two ranks, and the tour was a huge success. L'Arc-en-Ciel stopped activities until 2003 and each member started their own solo projects. Yukihiro started Acid Android, where he is the singer. L'Arc-en-Ciel came back with the single, "Ready Steady Go!", and album, Smile, after the three-year hiatus in 2004. Then followed up with Awake and "Link" in 2005. In 2007, L'Arc-en-Ciel released the single called "My Heart Draws a Dream" and album Kiss The group also released the single "Drink It Down" in January 2008, with the music composed by yukihiro.

In 2021, Yukihiro formed the supergroup Petit Brabancon with Kyo, Miya, antz (Tokyo Shoegazer), and Hirofumi Takamatsu (The Novembers).

== Equipment ==
With L'arc-en-Ciel, yukihiro has played Pearl drums and Sabian AA and HH-series cymbals. He uses two double bass drum kits, with different set ups. He has his own signature 13x3.5" snare drum made by Pearl. He has also played his kit with Remo rototoms.
