= Ken (musician) =

- Also known as: KEN P'unk, Kën D'Ark
- Born: November 28, 1968 (age 57); Maibara, Shiga, Japan
- Genres: Alternative rock; pop rock; punk rock
- Occupations: Musician; singer-songwriter; record producer
- Instruments: Vocals; guitar; drums; percussion; autoharp; keyboards
- Years active: 1992–present
- Label: Danger Crue
- Member of: L'Arc-en-Ciel
- Formerly of: Sons of All Pussys
- Website: ken-curlyhair.com

Ken (born November 28, 1968, in Maibara, Shiga) is a Japanese musician and singer-songwriter, best known as the guitarist of the rock band L'Arc-en-Ciel. After he joined them in 1992, they went on to sell over 40 million records, making them one of the best-selling music artists in Japan. He has written a breadth of L'Arc-en-Ciel's material, including "Vivid Colors", "The Fourth Avenue Cafe", "Niji", "Kasou", "My Heart Draws a Dream", "Daybreak's Bell" and "Chase". Ken was also the vocalist and guitarist of the rock trio Sons of All Pussys (also known as S.O.A.P.), and has released a solo album entitled In Physical.

== Biography ==
=== L'Arc-en-Ciel ===
Two months before his graduation in 1992, Ken left the Nagoya Institute of Technology, where he was an architect major, to join L'Arc-en-Ciel at the request of his childhood friend Tetsuya. On April 1, 1993, the band released their debut album Dune on the well-known independent record label Danger Crue Records. The album was a success and caught the attention of some major labels. In 1994, L'Arc-en-Ciel signed a contract with Sony Music Entertainment Japan's Ki/oon division and released their major debut album Tierra that same year. Their third studio album Heavenly followed in 1995. In 1996, their fourth album, True, became their first number one record on the Oricon Albums Chart and sold over a million copies. However, drummer Sakura was arrested for drug possession in early 1997, and the band took a hiatus.

L'Arc-en-Ciel resumed activities as a trio with the October 1997 release of the single "Niji". It features former Zi:Kill and Die in Cries drummer Yukihiro as a support member. Sakura officially announced his departure from L'Arc-en-Ciel on November 4, and the band held their first concert back at the Tokyo Dome on December 23, 1997, entitled Reincarnation. It was the band's first performance at the venue and had an attendance of 56,000 people, with the tickets sold out in a record-breaking four minutes. Yukihiro officially joined L'Arc-en-Ciel as their drummer on January 1, 1998. The single "Winter Fall", which was released at the end of the month, became the group's first number one on the Oricon Singles Chart.

L'Arc-en-Ciel went on to become one of the best-selling music artists in Japan. Their 1999 simultaneously released albums Ark and Ray are each one of the best-selling albums of all time in Japan. In 2003, L'Arc-en-Ciel were ranked number 58 on a list of the top 100 Japanese pop musicians by HMV Japan. In 2012, they became the first Japanese act to headline Madison Square Garden in New York City.

=== Sons of All Pussys ===
In 2002, during a break in L'Arc-en-Ciel's activities, Ken formed the band Sons of All Pussys (S.O.A.P.) with ex-L'Arc-en-Ciel drummer Sakura, and bassist Ein (a half Japanese/German model who appeared in a few L'Arc music videos). Each member contributed songs based on themes; Ken with love, Ein with desire, and Sakura with his experiences in jail, and together they released three albums; Grace, Gimme a Guitar and High!, and one single, "Paradise". S.O.A.P. has been inactive since 2006.

=== Solo career and other work ===
On August 23, 2006, Ken began a solo career with the release of the single "Speed" by Danger Crue Records. But it was another two and a half years before second single "Deeper" was released on March 4, 2009. His first studio album, In Physical, followed on April 22. The album was supported by his first solo tour, Live In Physical, from June 8 to July 16, 2009. Ken released the mini-album The Party on August 4, 2010. It was supported by the Hey! Join the Party! tour from October 5 to November 11. Ken's first solo release in 10 years, "Ambient Before the Trigger (Live at Trigger in the Box 2019)", was released digitally-only on November 28, 2020. It consists solely of a nearly 50-minute ambient live performance that Ken performed with Baroque guitarist Kei at the Trigger in the Box event on December 28, 2019.

Ken's mascot is a lion named C.H. Lion Rag Baby, or simply Rag Baby (ラグベベ). He appears on the musician's merchandise, at various mascot-related events, and runs Ken's Twitter account. Rag Baby came in 10th place in the corporate category of the 2013 Yuru-chara Grand Prix. In 2009, Ken began a column titled "Ken Gyūnyū" (Ken牛乳) for the magazine Ongaku to Hito and continued it for two years and seven months. It was collected and published as a book on January 25, 2013.

Ken contributed guitar to the song "The Inside War" from Sid bassist Aki's 2015 album Ephemeral, and produced Baroque's 2016 single "Girl". Ken arranged the songs "Monokuro no Keshiki" and "Ryūsei" for Mucc's 2017 self-cover album Koroshi no Shirabe II: This is Not Greatest Hits, and also provided keyboards and programming to the former. That year, Ken also contributed a cover of Mucc's "EMP" to their tribute album En. In 2018, Ken produced Daizystripper's single "4Get Me Not", and the songs "F+ix=You" and "Unreal" from A9's album Planet Nine. He composed, co-wrote and co-arranged the rock opera-style song "The Love Letter" for Tatsuro's 2022 album Hikagaku Hoteishiki.

== Equipment ==
Ken has used many different guitars in his career, including Gibsons and Steinbergers, but he is best known for playing the Fernandes and Fender brands. From circa 1995 to 2009, Ken was an endorser of Japan-based Fernandes Guitars. He had three different lines of signature models with them; the LD series, the LA series, and the LV series. The LA series have a reverse-headstock and had 24 frets up until 2003 and 21 frets from 2007 on, while the LV series was made by their Burny brand and mimics the shape of a Gibson Flying V. In December 2010, Ken endorsed American-based Fender Guitars. His first signature model with them, the Galaxy Red Stratocaster, was released in a limited amount in December 2011. There are two versions, the Team Built line was limited to only 30 copies, while the Masterbuilt line was made-to-order and has the words "C.H. Lion" engraved on the neck plate. A Japan-made version later received a general release in June 2017. An updated version was released in October 2021 to coincide with L'Arc-en-Ciel's 30th anniversary.

The FSR Jaguar model was released on December 20, 2013 in a limited amount of 150. It was created after a Jaguar that Ken customized himself caught the attention of a Fender product development specialist. The Paisley Fantasy Stratocaster with its custom paisley paint job was made for Ken in 2016 and became his main guitar, before being made available to the public in 2022. Ken's signature white and gold Experiment #1 Stratocaster was also made available in 2022. In 2023, Ken began using the jet black prototype of a new Stratocaster model referred to as the HH Prototype. The final version, Ken Stratocaster Dodome, received a limited release on May 22, 2026. It features 22 frets, Fishman Fluence Classic Humbucker pickups and a hardtail bridge. The latter two mark a change from Ken's previous Fender models, which all have single-coil pickups and whammy bars. Ken signed an endorsement contract with guitar string manufacturer Dean Markley USA in September 2015.

== Discography ==
=== Albums ===
- In Physical (2009.04.22), Oricon Albums Chart Peak Position: #8

=== Mini-albums ===
- The Party (2010.08.04) #18

=== Singles ===
- "Speed" (2006.08.23), Oricon Singles Chart Peak Position: #4
- "Deeper" (2009.03.04) #7
- "Ambient Before the Trigger (Live at Trigger in the Box 2019)" (2020.11.28, digital-only)

=== Home videos ===
- Ken Tour 2009 "Live in Physical" (2009.11.18)

== Other work ==
Mucc

- "Ageha" (2008.08.27) – produced
- "Sora to Ito" (2009.01.28) – produced
- "Freesia" (2009.11.25) – produced and arranged
- Myakuhaku (2017.01.25) – produced

Baroque

- "Girl" (2016.10.26) – produced

Tatsuro

- "The Love Letter" (2022.02.02) – composed, co-wrote and co-arranged
