= Flow The Best =

FLOW THE BEST ~Single Collection~

Compilation album by FLOW
- Released: December 20, 2006
- Genre: Rock
- Label: Ki/oon Records

FLOW chronology
FLOW THE BEST ~Single Collection~ (2006)	Coupling Collection (2009)

FLOW THE BEST ~Single Collection~ is FLOW's first best album. Two different editions of the album were released: regular and limited. The limited edition includes a bonus DVD. It reached #4 on the Oricon charts and charted for 11 weeks. *

Limited Edition Cover

== Track listing ==
No.	Title	Length
1.	"COLORS"	3:38
2.	"Around the World"	4:24
3.	"Re:member"	3:17
4.	"Garden ~Summer Edit~"	3:48
5.	"DAYS"	4:13
6.	"Rookie"	3:24
7.	"Life is beautiful"	4:26
8.	"GO!!!"	3:59
9.	"Ryuusei (流星)"	4:15
10.	"Dream Express (ドリームエクスプレス)"	4:07
11.	"Blaster (ブラスター)"	3:22
12.	"Melos"	4:05
13.	"Okuru Kotoba (贈る言葉)"	3:08
14.	"Melody -Bonus Track-"	5:41

== Bonus DVD Track listing ==
No.	Title	Length
1.	"COLORS (PV)"
2.	"Around the world (PV)"
3.	"Re:member (PV)"
4.	"Garden (PV)"
5.	"DAYS (PV)"
6.	"Rookie (PV)"
7.	"Life is beautiful (PV)"
8.	"GO!!! (PV)"
9.	"Ryuusei (PV)"
10.	"Dream Express (PV)"
11.	"Blaster (PV)"
12.	"Melos (PV)"
13.	"Okuru Kotoba (PV)"
14.	"FLOW THE CARNIVAL 2006 "Kaimakusen" Digest ("開幕戦" ダイジェスト; Opener)"
