= Anime Best =

FLOW ANIME BEST

Compilation album by FLOW
- Released: March 23, 2011
- Genre: Rock
- Length: 1:05:17
- Label: Ki/oon Records

FLOW chronology
Coupling Collection (2009)	FLOW ANIME BEST (2011)	FLOW ANIME BEST Kiwami (2015)

FLOW ANIME BEST is FLOW's third best album. It is a compilation of FLOW assembling all the songs released in anime. The album has two editions: regular and limited. The limited edition includes a Kira Kira☆BOX cover, a DVD with a short-anime featuring the band and Nana Mizuki, a special anime illustration book featuring various anime shows that FLOW did theme songs for, a special photo and illustration lyrics booklet and an event lottery ticket. It reached #5 on the Oricon charts and charted for 8 weeks.

== Track listing ==
No.	Title	Length
1.	"Go!!!" (Naruto fourth opening)	3:59
2.	"Days" (Eureka Seven first opening)	4:11
3.	"Realize" (Eureka Seven video game opening)	3:33
4.	"Re:member" (Naruto eighth opening)	3:17
5.	"Colors" (Code Geass: Lelouch of the Rebellion first opening theme)	3:38
6.	"Word of the Voice" (Persona: Trinity Soul second opening theme)	3:47
7.	"World End" (Code Geass: Lelouch of the Rebellion R2 second opening theme)	3:48
8.	"Summer Freak" (Naruto Shounen-Hen second opening theme)	3:21
9.	"Sign" (Naruto Shippuden sixth opening theme)	3:56
10.	"Calling" (Heroman first ending theme)	3:35
11.	"1/3 no Junjō na Kanjō" (cover of Rurouni Kenshin sixth ending (originally done by Siam Shade))	3:53
12.	"Flow Anime OP-ED Size Special Collection"	14:55
13.	"Flow (2 Animeny DJ's MegaMix)"	5:55
14.	"Metal Blade High-School"	3:29
