= Isle (album) =

Studio album by Flow
- Released: March 19, 2008
- Genre: Rock
- Length: 59:31
- Label: Ki/oon Records

Flow chronology
| Golden Coast (2005) | Isle (2008) | #5 (2009) |

Professional ratings
Review scores
| Source | Rating |
|---|---|
| AllMusic | 3/5 stars |

Isle is Flow's fourth studio album. The album comes in two editions: regular and limited. The limited edition comes with a bonus DVD. It reached #7 on the Oricon charts and charted for 12 weeks.

== Track listing ==
| No. | Title | Length |
|---|---|---|
| 1. | "Answer" | 4:36 |
| 2. | "Re:member (Album Mix)" | 3:17 |
| 3. | "Fuyu no Amaoto (冬の雨音)" | 4:33 |
| 4. | "Tsubaki (椿)" | 5:25 |
| 5. | "Welcome to my misery" | 3:28 |
| 6. | "Carry on" | 3:14 |
| 7. | "Colors (Album Mix)" | 3:35 |
| 8. | "Hidamari feat. Azumi from Wyolica (陽だまり)" | 5:00 |
| 9. | "Smells Like Thirty Spirit" | 3:09 |
| 10. | "Survive ~mission No.149~" | 3:55 |
| 11. | "Night Parade" | 4:55 |
| 12. | "Around the World (Album Mix)" | 4:23 |
| 13. | "Taiyou no Uta (太陽の唄)" | 4:15 |
| 14. | "Arigatou (ありがとう)" | 5:29 |
| Total length: | | 59:31 |

== Bonus DVD Track listing ==
| No. | Title | Length |
|---|---|---|
| 1. | "Answer (PV)" |
| 2. | "Fuyu no Amaoto (PV)" |
| 3. | "Night Parade (PV)" |
| 4. | "Arigatou (PV)" |
| 5. | "Just do it!!! (PV)" |
| 6. | "Re:member (Live Video)" |
| 7. | "Colors (Live Video)" |
| 8. | "Answer (Live Video)" |
| 9. | "Fuyu no Amaoto/Night Parade (Music Video Making)" |
| 10. | "Arigatou (Photo Shooting)" |
