= Coupling Collection =

Compilation album by FLOW
- Released: November 4, 2009
- Genre: Rock
- Label: Ki/oon Records

FLOW chronology
FLOW THE BEST (2006)	Coupling Collection (2009)	FLOW ANIME BEST (2011)

Coupling Collection (カップリングコレクション) is FLOW's first B-Side best album. The album comes into two editions: regular and limited. The limited edition includes a bonus DVD and a BOX Special Package. It reached #25 on the Oricon charts and charted for 4 weeks. *

== Track listing ==
No.	Title	Length
1.	"PULSE"	3:37
2.	"Fiesta"	3:01
3.	"Shakys"	4:05
4.	"Steppers high"	3:20
5.	"NIGHT PARADE"	4:56
6.	"KANDATA"	3:39
7.	"Boku ni Sasageru Ballad (僕に捧げるバラード)"	4:49
8.	"ESCA"	3:20
9.	"Sharirara (シャリララ)"	3:09
10.	"RISING DRAGON"	3:16
11.	"Always"	4:04
12.	"Kaleidoscope (カレイドスコープ)"	3:36
13.	"Image"	3:40
14.	"Nostalgia (ノスタルジア)"	4:17
15.	"Tabibito (旅人)"	4:14
16.	"DAYS -PIANO HOUSE Mix-"	6:49
17.	"Just do it!!!"	2:00
18.	"Summer Freak"	3:22
19.	"Fun Time Delivery 2009"	4:24

== Bonus DVD Track listing ==
No.	Title	Length
1.	"Fun Time Delivery 2009 (PV)"
2.	"NUTS BANG!!! (PV)"
3.	"SUMMER FREAK ~Ofu da!! Hawai da!! 4kakan no Natsu Yasumi~ (PV)"
4.	"Secret Live at Bunankoutou Gakkou 2009.02.25"
5.	"Acoustic Live 2009.05.05"
6.	"Photo Session "NUTS BANG!!!""
7.	"Web Program "Natsu ban -natsuban-" Edit ver."
