= Game (Flow album) =

Studio album by Flow
- Released: May 26, 2004
- Genre: Rock
- Label: Ki/oon Records

Flow chronology
Splash!!! (2003)	Game (2004)	Golden Coast (2005)

Limited edition cover

Singles from Game
- 1. "Blaster" Released: 2003; 2. "Dream Express" Released: 2003; 3. "Ryūsei / Sharirara" Released: 2004; 4. "Go!!!" Released: 2004

Game is the second studio album by Japanese rock band Flow. Two editions exist: regular and limited. The limited edition includes a bonus DVD. It reached #4 on the Oricon charts and charted for 17 weeks.

== Track listing ==
No.	Title	Length
1.	"Go!!!"	3:56
2.	"Blaster (ブラスター)"	3:24
3.	"Ryuusei (流星)"	4:45
4.	"Without you"	2:34
5.	"Taiyou (太陽)"	3:43
6.	"Surprise"	3:55
7.	"Nostalgia (ノスタルジア)"	4:15
8.	"Sharirara (シャリララ)"	3:06
9.	"Shuu Chuu Chiryou Shitsu -I.C.U.- (集中治療室)"	2:44
10.	"MC2=E"	3:34
11.	"Sono Saki ni wa... (その先には...)"	3:18
12.	"Dream Express (ドリームエクスプレス)"	4:06
13.	"Hands"	4:30
