= 5 (Flow album) =

#5

Studio album by Flow
- Released: January 28, 2009
- Genres: Rock; ska punk
- Label: Ki/oon

Flow chronology
| Isle (2008) | #5 (2009) | Microcosm (2010) |

Limited edition cover

Professional ratings
Review scores
| Source | Rating |
|---|---|
| AllMusic | 2.5/5 stars |

#5 is Flow's fifth studio album. The album comes into two editions: regular and limited. The limited edition includes a bonus DVD. It reached #7 on the Oricon charts and charted for 5 weeks.

== Track listing ==
| No. | Title | Length |
|---|---|---|
| 1. | "World End" | 3:46 |
| 2. | "Heavenly Stars" | 2:59 |
| 3. | "Pulse" | 3:38 |
| 4. | "Snow Flake ~Kioku no Koshitsu~ (Album version)" | 5:11 |
| 5. | "Anthem" | 3:55 |
| 6. | "Brand-New Day" | 3:34 |
| 7. | "Akai Siren (赤いサイレン)" | 3:35 |
| 8. | "Antares (アンタレス)" | 4:54 |
| 9. | "Music" | 3:29 |
| 10. | "Word of the Voice" | 3:47 |
| 11. | "Butterfly (バタフライ)" | 4:55 |
| 12. | "Gakuen Tengoku (学園天国)" | 3:11 |

== Bonus DVD Track listing ==
| No. | Title | Length |
|---|---|---|
| 1. | "Word of the Voice (PV)" |
| 2. | "World End (PV)" |
| 3. | "Snow Flake ~Kioku no Koshitsu~ (PV)" |
| 4. | "Making of Word of the Voice" |
| 5. | "Making of World End" |
| 6. | "Making of Snow Flake ~Kioku no Koshitsu~" |
| 7. | "Recording Diary" |
