= Nuts Bang =

EP by Flow
- Released: July 22, 2009
- Genre: Rock
- Label: Ki/oon

Flow chronology
| #5 (2009) | Nuts Bang (2009) | Microcosm (2010) |

Nuts Bang is Flow's first major extended play. It reached #23 on the Oricon charts and charted for 3 weeks.

== Track listing ==
| No. | Title | Length |
|---|---|---|
| 1. | "Nuts Bang!!!" | 4:02 |
| 2. | "Summer Freak" | 3:20 |
| 3. | "Bring It On!" | 3:06 |
| 4. | "Tasogare Summer Days (黄昏サマーデイズ)" | 4:06 |
| 5. | "Surfin' U.S.A." | 3:26 |
