= Flow (Japanese band) =

Japanese rock band

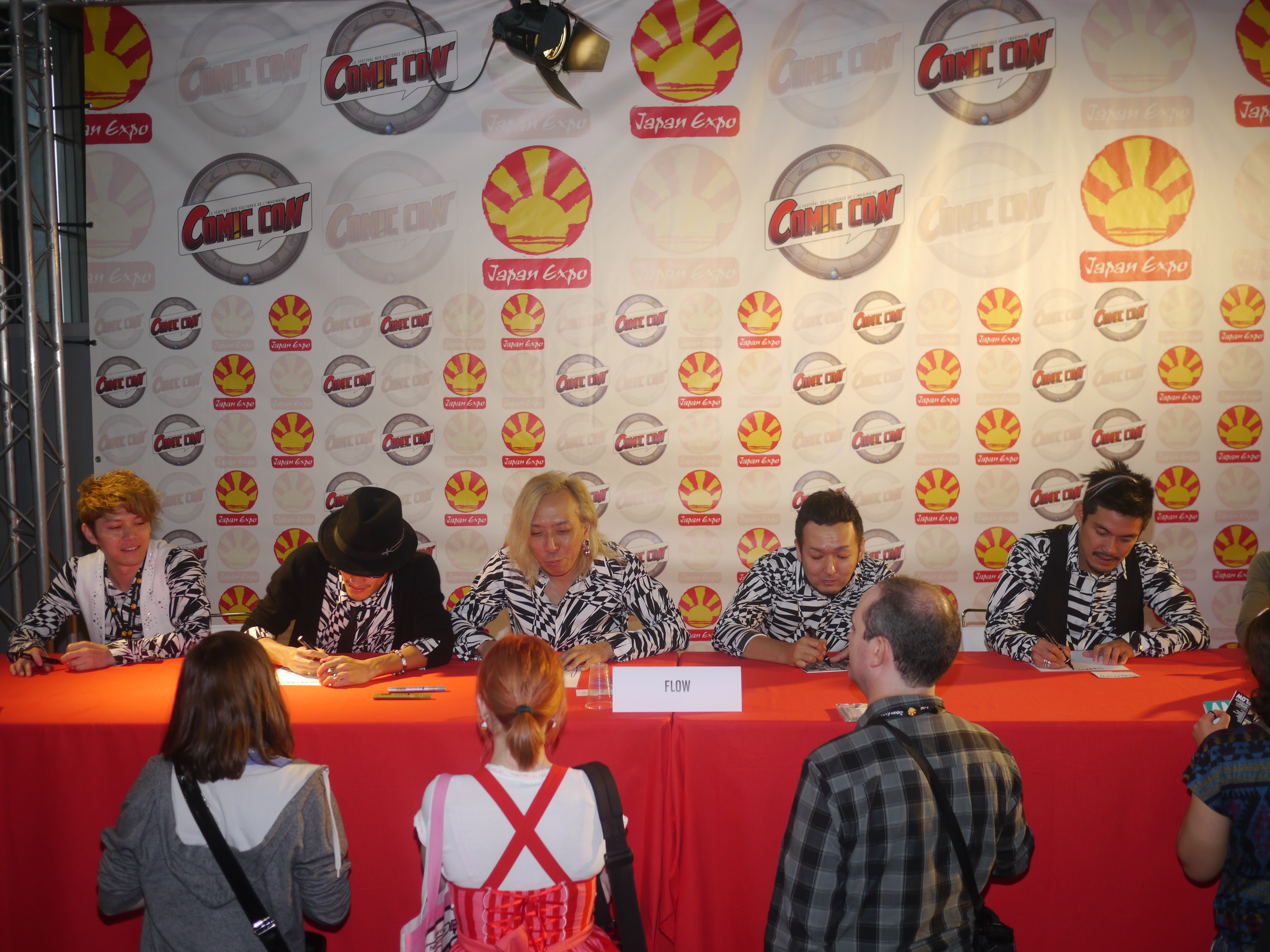
- Flow at Japan Expo 2012 in Paris, France

Background information
- Origin: Tokyo, Japan
- Genres: Alternative rock; pop-punk; indie rock; rap rock; dance-rock; ska punk
- Years active: 1998–present
- Labels: Fun City Records (2002-2003); Ki/oon Music (2003–2020); Sacra Music (2020–present)
- Members: Kōshi Asakawa (Vocal); Keigo Hayashi (Vocal); Takeshi Asakawa (Guitar); Kōtaro Gotō (Bass); Hiroshi Iwasaki (Drums)
- Website: www.flow-official.jp

Flow (stylized in all caps) is a Japanese rock band formed in 1998 as a five-piece band made up of two vocalists, a guitarist, a bassist, and a drummer. They are signed to Sacra Music. As of November 2023, the band has released 40 singles and 12 studio albums. Their songs have been featured in the opening sequences of several anime and Japanese drama series.

== History ==
=== 1993–2003: Formation and major label debut ===
The group began in 1993 when brothers Kōshi (elder: vocals, rhythm guitar) and Take (younger: lead guitar) began playing together. They formed Flow in 1998, and by 2000, were joined by Keigo (vocals), Gotō (bass) and Iwasaki (drums). In 2001, the band released its first maxi single, Flow #0. In 2002, the group released two mini-albums within the same year, followed by "Okuru Kotoba", Flow's first cover single, released in January 2003, which remained on the Oricon indie chart for seven consecutive weeks and also hit No. 6 on the overall singles chart. In the spring of that year, their first full-scale album Splash!!! debuted at No. 2 on the Oricon album chart. In July 2003, Flow released the single "Blaster" on the major label Ki/oon Records.

=== 2004–2007: "Go!!!", Naruto, and Code Geass ===
In April 2004, they released "Go!!!", which stayed on the Oricon Top 10 Chart for three weeks. In May 2004, Flow released their first major label album Game. A string of singles followed and in July 2005 the band released its third album, Golden Coast. After the release of Golden Coast, Flow released two A-side singles, including the double A-side "Around The World / Kandata". The songs "Go!!!" and "Re:member" both served as opening themes to the anime series Naruto, as well as "Sign" for Naruto Shippuden. "Days" was the first opening for Bones' Eureka Seven anime, and "Realize" was the opening for the PlayStation 2 video games based on the same series. Flow performed live in the United States for the first time in Dallas, Texas, on September 2, 2006, at AnimeFest in Dallas. Flow then released "Colors" in 2006, the first opening for Sunrise's original series, Code Geass: Lelouch of the Rebellion. Their song "Answer" was the first opening theme for the live action Japanese drama Detective School Q. They performed "Night Parade" with the hip-hop band Home Made Kazoku.

=== 2008–2012: Persona, Heroman, anime convention appearances ===
In February 2008, they released the single "Arigatō", followed by Persona -trinity soul-'s opening theme, "Word of the Voice" in June 2008. They performed Code Geass: Lelouch of the Rebellion R2's second opening theme "World End" released in 2008. In 2009, the band performed "Sign", the sixth opening for Naruto Shippuden. The band released a B-side compilation album on November 4, 2009. Their single "Calling" was featured as the ending for the anime Heroman. Flow returned to North America to perform at Anime Central, in Rosemont, Illinois on May 20, 2011, and FanimeCon in San Jose, California on May 28, 2010, and in May 2011. Their song "Hey!!!" was the third opening theme for the anime Beelzebub, and the song "Brave Blue" was used as the second opening theme for the anime Eureka Seven AO. In 2012, they performed in France for the first time at Japan Expo.

=== 2013–2019: Flow Anime Best and first world tour ===
They provided a cover of "Cha-La Head-Cha-La" as the main theme song for the film Dragon Ball Z: Battle of Gods; the song, coupled with an insert song from the film, was released as a double A-side single on March 20, 2013, and subsequently would be featured as the opening theme for Dragon Ball video games such as Dragon Ball Z: Battle of Z and Dragon Ball XenoVerse. Flow released their eighth studio album Flow The Max!!! on March 27, 2013. Flow went to Brazil for the first time to perform at Ressacca Friends in 2013. Their single "Ai Ai Ai ni Utarete Bye Bye Bye" released on February 26, 2014, was used as the second opening to the anime Samurai Flamenco. Flow returned to Brazil in the summer of 2014 to perform at Anime Friends in São Paulo and at SuperCon in Recife. They returned to perform at AnimeFest after 8 years in August 2014 at the Sheraton Dallas Hotel. Their single, "7 -seven-", was a collaboration with the band Granrodeo and was featured as the ending theme to the anime The Seven Deadly Sins. Flow released their second anime best album compilation Flow Anime Best Kiwami on February 25, 2015. Flow's first-ever world tour, Flow World Tour 2015 Kiwami, saw them performing five times in Japan and fourteen times in seven other countries. Their first digital single, "Hikari Oikakete" (光追いかけて), was released on March 21, 2015, and was used as the image song for the Naruto stage play Live Spectacle Naruto. Their single "Niji no Sora" (虹の空) was used as the 34th ending theme of Naruto Shippuden.

Their single "Steppin' out" was used as the opening theme of Durarara!!x2: Ketsu. Flow's single "Kaze no Uta (風ノ唄) / Burn" was released on August 24, 2016; the songs are used as the opening themes of Tales of Zestiria the X and Tales of Berseria. Their single "Innosense" was released on February 8, 2017; the song was used as the second ending theme of Tales of Zestiria the X. The band covered "Classic" on the album Tribute of Mucc -en- as a tribute to the band Mucc released on November 22, 2017. Flow returned to North America to perform at Anime Boston on March 30, 2018. They covered "D.O.D. (Drink Or Die)" for the June 6, 2018, hide tribute album Tribute Impulse. They also performed the theme song "Neiro" (音色; lit. "Sound-colored") for the drama series Sachiiro no One Room. Their song "Break it down" was used in the 2020 game Naruto x Boruto Ninja Tribes. Flow again performed at the Nippon Budokan on January 30, 2019. They released their album Tribalythm on April 10, 2019, and their tour Flow Live Tour 2019: Tribalythm promoted the album.

=== 2020–2022: Online concerts, collaborations ===
Flow performed Flow Chokaigi 2020 Anime Shibari Returns at the Makuhari Messe Event Hall on February 24, 2020. They covered Granrodeo's "Modern Strange Cowboy" on the album Granrodeo Tribute Album "Rodeo Freak" released on May 13, 2020. Flow's song "Shinsekai" (新世界; lit. "New World") was used for opening theme of the 2020 anime series Shadowverse. They held a special online concert series featuring all 11 of their albums titled Flow Special Online Live Comprehensive Album Series: Flame of 12 Months every 26 of the month, which started on September 26, 2020, and ended on August 26, 2021. The band produced "Nijīro no Puddle" (虹色のPuddle; lit. "Puddle of Rainbow Color") for the virtual YouTuber agency Nijisanji, which celebrated their 3rd anniversary in 2021. Their single "United Sparrows" was used for the ending theme of the 2021 anime series Back Arrow. On August 9, 2021, they held their first in-person concert since the COVID-19 pandemic titled Flow The Carnival 2021 ~Shinsekai~ in Line Cube Shibuya.

The single "Dice" was released on December 15, 2021, and contained three collaboration songs. "Dice" was used for the first opening theme song of the 15th anniversary rebroadcast of the 2006 anime series Code Geass: Lelouch of the Rebellion. "Moment" (モメント) was featured in the slot machine game Pachislot Anemone: Eureka Seven HI-Evolution. "Yūshou" (優勝; lit. "Winner") was a partnership between Flow and Afterglow from the BanG Dream! Girls Band Party! mobile rhythm game. The two parties also collaborated for a cover of "Colors", which is a playable song in Girls Band Party!; "Yūshō" was also added to the game for a limited time from December 11, 2021, to January 10, 2022.

Two songs from the single "Gold" were used in the Naruto franchise. "Tomoshibi" (燈; lit. "Light") was used as the image song for the stage play Live Spectacle "Naruto" ~Uzumaki Naruto Monogatari~, while "Gold" used as the tenth opening theme song for the anime Boruto: Naruto Next Generation in January 2022. The single titled "Daydream Believer" (デイドリーム ビリーヴァー)" was a collaboration with the band Orange Range and was used for the second opening theme of 15th Anniversary re-run of Code Geass: Lelouch of the Rebellion R2 anime. The single also includes a cover of Orange Range's "O2".

=== 2023–present: 20th anniversary, Flow World Tour Anime Shibari ===
For their 20th anniversary, Flow performed the Flow World Tour Anime Shibari 2024–2025, in which they performed only their anime songs. The tour took the band to Australia, Europe, Middle East, Asia, and North America. In October 2025, Flow launched an American and European tour in which they will perform only Naruto and Boruto songs, called Flow World Tour 2025 Naruto The Rock.

== Members ==
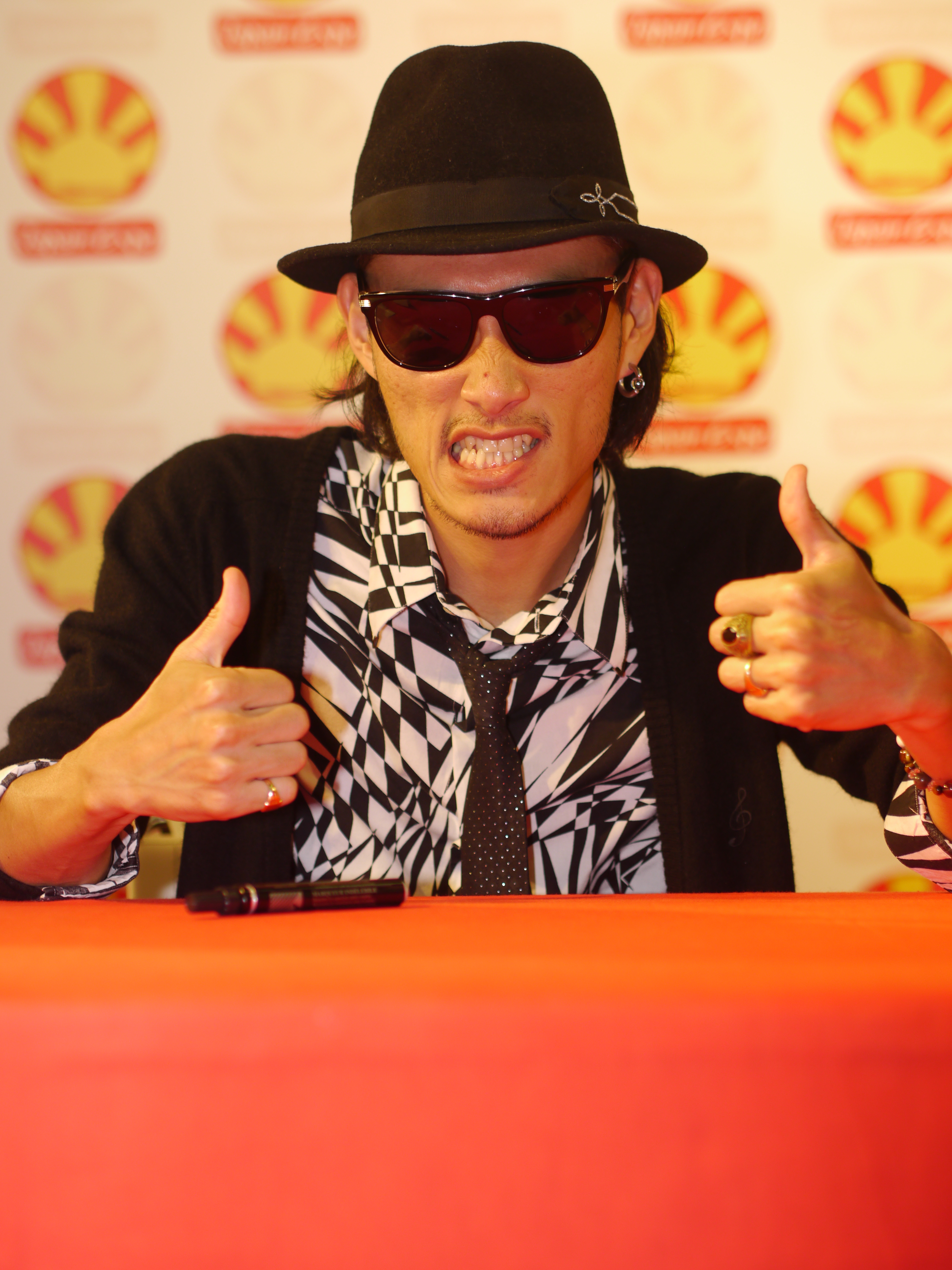
Kohshi

Kohshi

- Position: Vocalist, Rapping, Rhythm Guitarist
- Real name: Kōshi Asakawa
- Birthday: April 22, 1977
- Birthplace: Saitama
- Leader years: 2014, 2017, 2020

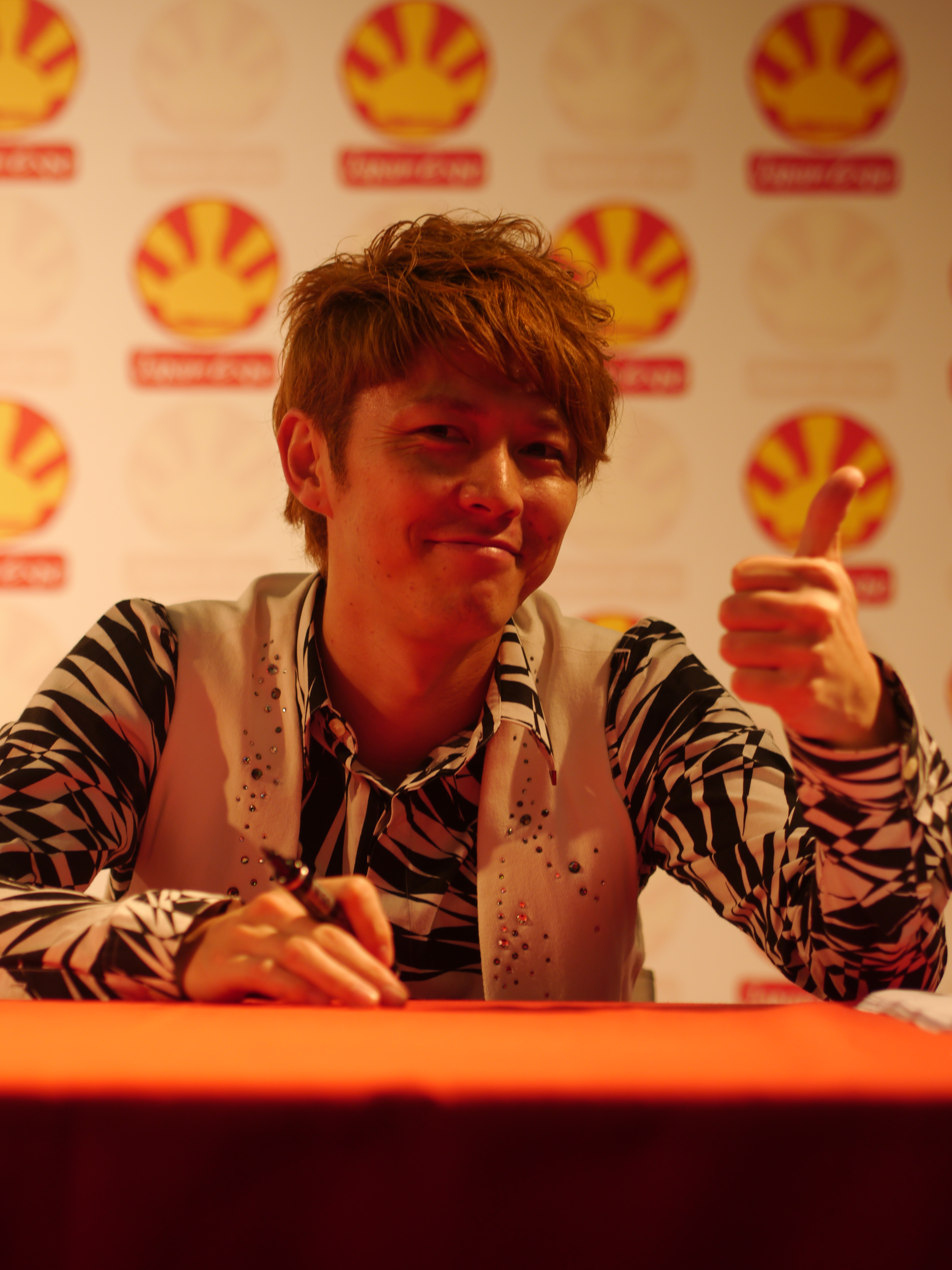
Keigo

Keigo

- Position: Vocalist, Rapping, Harmonica
- Real name: Keigo Hayashi
- Birthday: July 1, 1977
- Birthplace: Tokyo
- Leader years: 2011, 2018

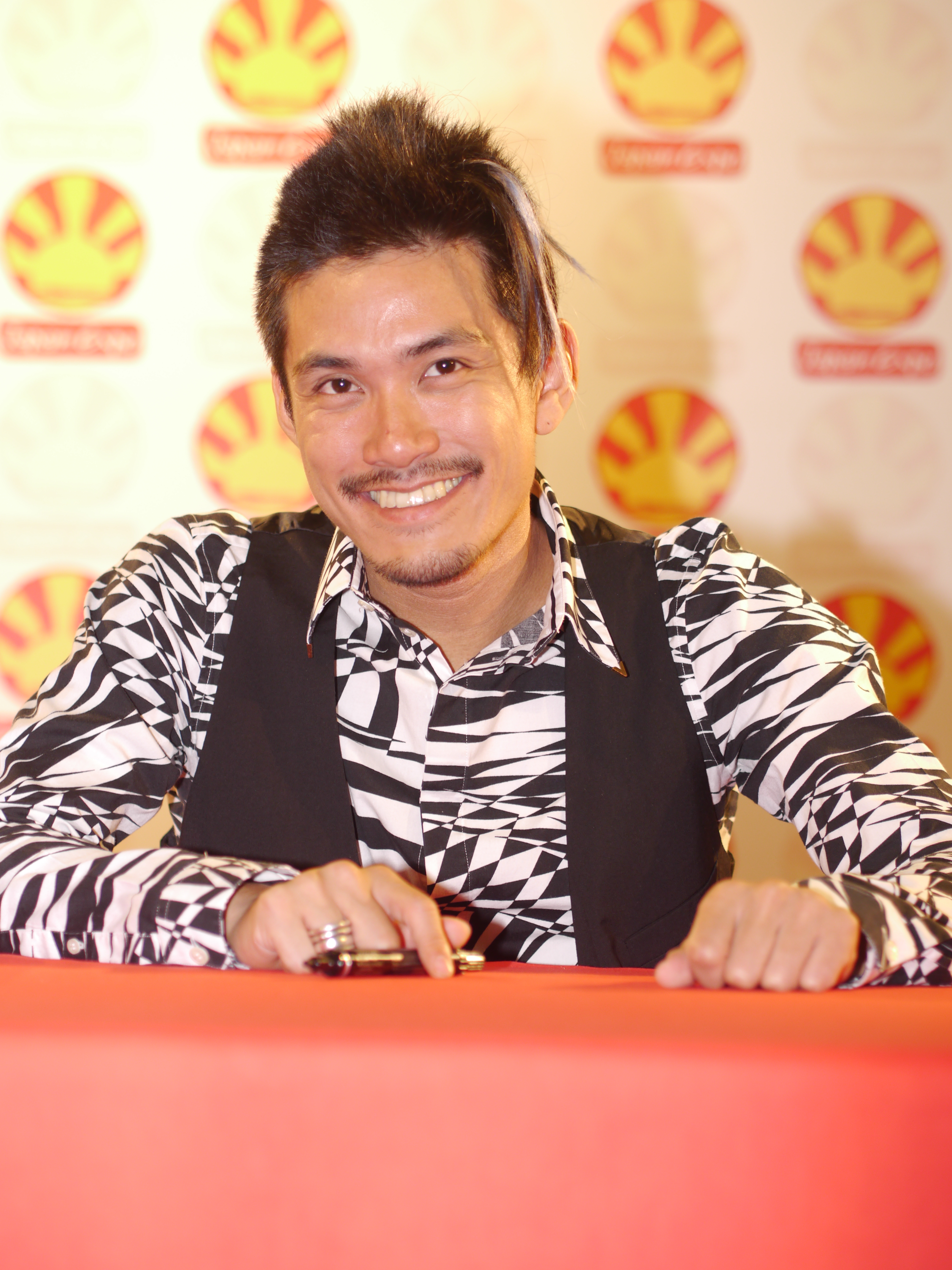
Take

Take

- Position: Lead Guitarist, Backing Vocalist, Programing, Keyboards, DJ
- Real name: Takeshi Asakawa
- Birthday: August 31, 1978
- Birthplace: Saitama
- Leader years: 1998–2007, June-December 2009, 2012, 2015, 2016, 2024, 2026

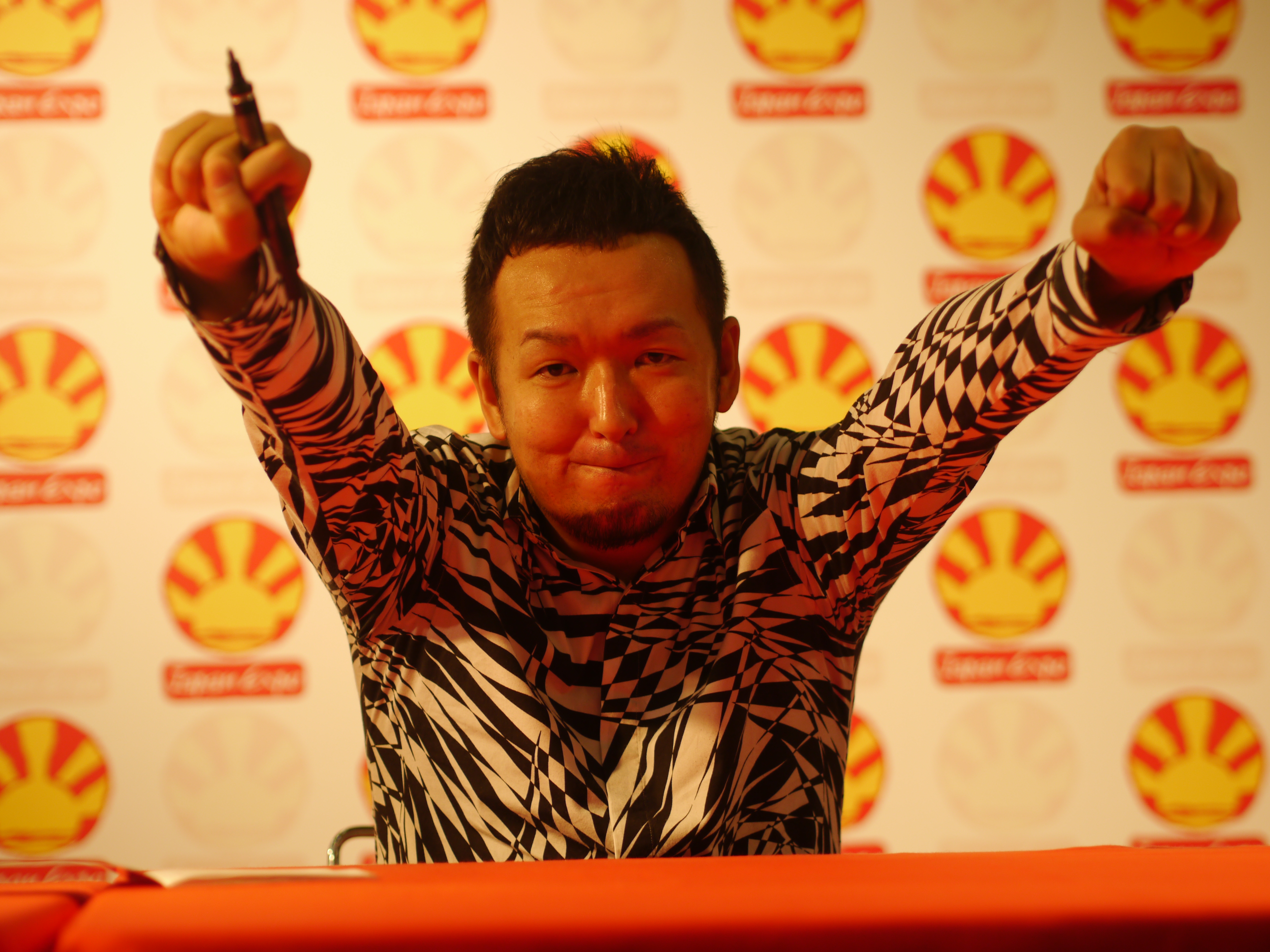
Got's

Got's

- Position: Bassist, Backing Vocalist, Chorus
- Real name: Kohtaro Gotō
- Birthday: January 26, 1977
- Birthplace: Niigata
- Leader years: 2010, 2013, 2023, 2025

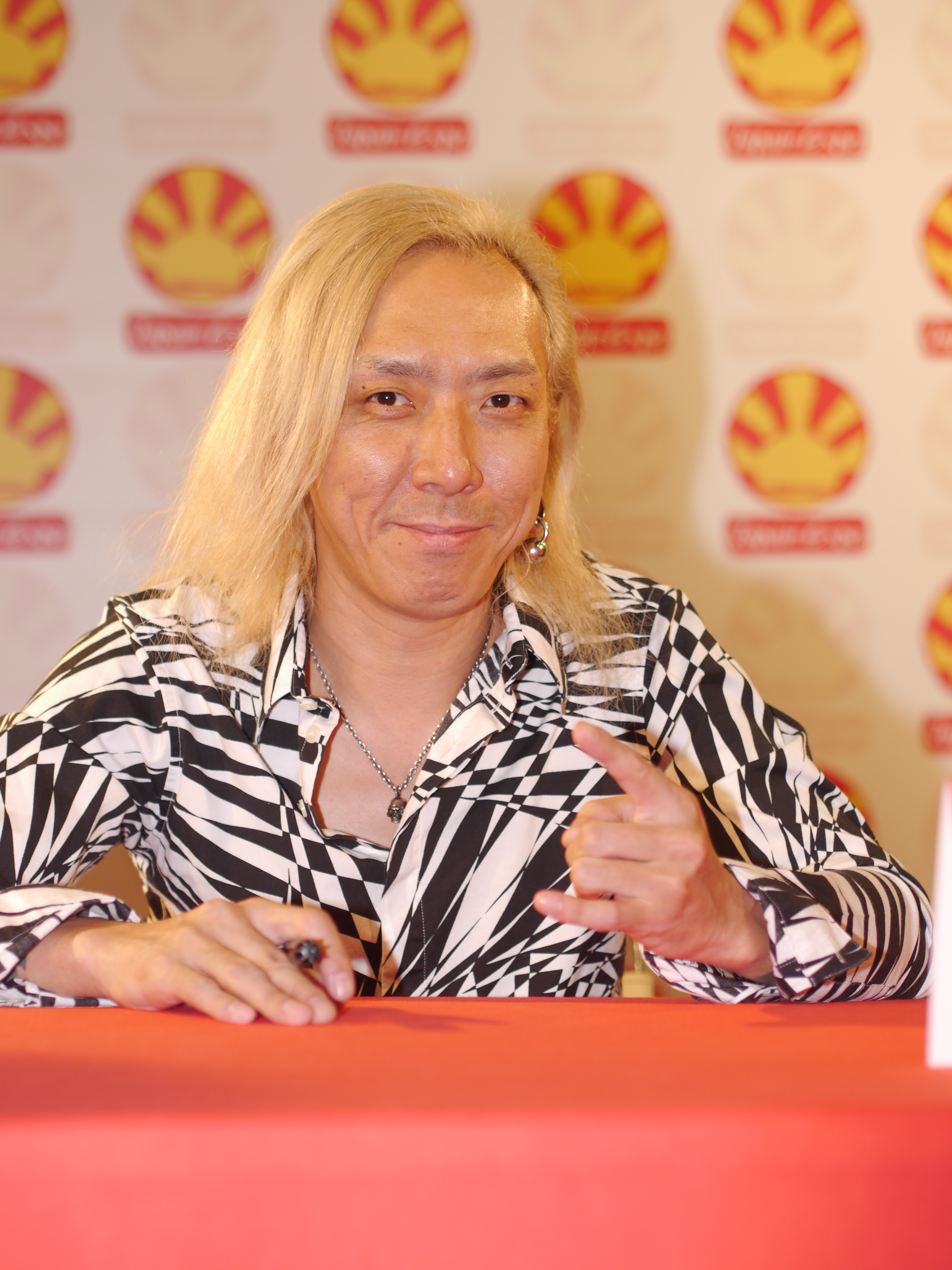
Iwasaki

Iwasaki

- Position: Drummer, Backing Vocalist, Percussion, Sampling
- Real Name: Hiroshi Iwasaki
- Birthday: November 21, 1969
- Birth Place: Osaka
- Leader years: 2008, January-May 2009, 2019, 2021, 2022

Touring members

- Haruna Miyoshi - Bass (2023, during concerts held in August; 2025, Freedom Nagoya, Crunchyroll Anime Awards, Nagano Aniera Festa)
- Masami Endo - Bass (2023, Naruto The Live)
- Jinichiro Hori - Keyboards (2025, Billboard Live)
- Mai Tanizaki - Violin (2025, Billboard Live)
- Majikun - Keyboards (2025, Billboard Live)
- Tsubasa - Percussion (2025, Billboard Live)
- Isamu Takita - Bass (2025, Flow The Festival, Anime Expo, Sammy's New Horizon Fest)
- Yuta Tsujimura - Bass (2025, Flow The Festival in Shanghai)

== Discography ==
=== Albums ===
==== Studio albums ====
Title	Album details	JPN chart		Certifications
Title	Album details	Peak position	Weeks on chart	Certifications
Splash!!!	Released: May 21, 2003; Label: Ki/oon Records; Formats: CD, CD+DVD, digital download	2	18	RIAJ: Gold
Game	Released: May 26, 2004; Label: Ki/oon Records; Formats: CD, CD+DVD, digital download	4	17	RIAJ: Gold
Golden Coast	Released: July 20, 2005; Label: Ki/oon Records; Formats: CD, digital download	9	8	
Isle	Released: March 19, 2008; Label: Ki/oon Records; Formats: CD, CD+DVD, digital download	7	12	
#5	Released: January 28, 2009; Label: Ki/oon Records; Formats: CD, CD+DVD, digital download	7	5	
Microcosm	Released: June 16, 2010; Label: Ki/oon Records; Formats: CD, CD+DVD, digital download	9	5	
Black & White	Released: February 12, 2012; Label: Ki/oon Records; Formats: CD, CD+DVD, digital download	29	3	
Flow The Max!!!	Released: March 27, 2013; Label: Ki/oon Records; Formats: CD, CD+DVD, digital download	21	4	
26 a Go Go!!!	Released: March 26, 2014; Label: Ki/oon Records; Formats: CD, CD+DVD, digital download	36	3	
#10	Released: February 3, 2016; Label: Ki/oon Records; Formats: CD, CD+DVD, digital download	26	3	
Tribalythm	Released: April 10, 2019; Label: Ki/oon Records; Formats: CD, CD+Blu-ray, digital download	21	2	
Voy✩✩✩	Released: February 2, 2023; Label: Sacra Music; Formats: CD, CD+Blu-ray, digital download	—	—	

==== Extended plays ====
Title	EP details	JPN chart	
Title	EP details	Peak position	Weeks on chart
Sunshine 60	Released: August 31, 2002; Label: Fun City Records; Format: CD	202	—
Like a Rolling Snow	Released: November 27, 2002; Label: Fun City Records; Format: CD	—	—
Nuts Bang!!!	Released: July 22, 2009; Label: Ki/oon Records; Formats: CD, digital download	23	3
Fighting Dreamers	Released: June 28, 2017; Label: Ki/oon Records; Formats: CD, digital download	36	4

==== Compilation albums ====
Title	Album details	JPN chart		Certifications
Title	Album details	Peak position	Weeks on chart	Certifications
Flow The Best: Single Collection	Released: December 20, 2006; Label: Ki/oon Records; Formats: CD, CD+DVD, digital download	4	11	RIAJ: Gold
Coupling Collection	Released: November 4, 2009; Label: Ki/oon Records; Formats: CD, CD+DVD, digital download	25	4	
Flow Anime Best	Released: March 23, 2011; Label: Ki/oon Records; Formats: CD, CD+DVD, digital download	5	8	
Flow Anime Best Kiwami	Released: February 25, 2015; Label: Ki/oon Records; Formats: CD, CD+DVD, digital download	35	4	
Flow The Best Anime Shibari	Released: March 7, 2018; Label: Ki/oon Records; Formats: CD, CD+DVD, digital download	21	5	

=== Singles ===
Title	Year	Peak chart positions		Certifications	Album
Title	Year	JPN Oricon	JPN Hot	Certifications	Album
"Blaster" (ブラスター)	2003	12	—		Game
"Dream Express" (ドリームエクスプレス)	2003	9	—		Game
"Ryūsei" (流星)	2004	12	—		Game
"Sharirara" (シャリララ)	2004	12	—		Game
"Go!!!"	2004	6	24	RIAJ: Gold (phy.); Platinum (dig.); Gold (rt.); Gold (st.)	Game
"Life Is Beautiful"	2004	28	—		Golden Coast
"Rookie"	2005	32	—		Golden Coast
"Stay Gold"	2005	32	—		Golden Coast
"Days"	2005	3	—	RIAJ: Gold (phy.); 2× Platinum (dig.); Platinum (rt.)	Golden Coast
"Garden ~Summer Edit~"	2005	50	—		Golden Coast
"Re:member"	2006	12	—	RIAJ: Gold (dig.)	Isle
"Around the World"	2006	23	—		Isle
"Kandata"	2006	23	—		Isle
"Colors"	2006	2	—	RIAJ: Platinum (dig.); Gold (rt.)	Isle
"Answer"	2007	7	—	RIAJ: Gold (phy.); Platinum (rt.)	Isle
"Fuyu no Amaoto" (冬の雨音)	2007	19	—		Isle
"Night Parade" (with Home Made Kazoku)	2007	19	—		Isle
"Arigatō" (ありがとう)	2008	25	18		Isle
"Word of the Voice"	2008	15	45		#5
"World End"	2008	4	7	RIAJ: Gold (rt.)	#5
"Snow Flake ~Kioku no Koshitsu~" (Snow Flake ~記憶の固執~)	2008	24	49		#5
"Pulse"	2008	24	—		#5
"Sign"	2010	4	14	RIAJ: Gold (rt.)	Microcosm
"Calling"	2010	21	37		Microcosm
"Tabidachi Graffiti" (旅立ちグラフィティ)	2010	32	88		Black & White
"1/3 no Junjō na Kanjō" (1/3の純情な感情)	2011	20	—		Flow Anime Best
"Hey!!!"	2011	23	—		Black & White
"Rock Climbers" (ロッククライマーズ)	2012	43	—		Black & White
"Brave Blue" (ブレイブルー)	2012	12	41		Flow The Max!!!
"Hero ~Kibō no Uta~" (Hero ~希望の歌~)	2013	24	39		Flow The Max!!!
"Cha-La Head-Cha-La"	2013	24	—		Flow The Max!!!
"Tokonatsu Endless" (常夏エンドレス)	2013	35	—		26 a Go Go!!!
"Ai Ai Ai ni Utarete Bye Bye Bye" (愛愛愛に撃たれてバイバイバイ)	2014	44	99		26 a Go Go!!!
"7 -Seven-" (featuring Granrodeo)	2014	10	17		
"Niji no Sora" (虹の空)	2015	34	—		#10
"Steppin' Out"	2016	18	54		#10
"Kaze no Uta" (風ノ唄)	2016	17	11		Tribalythm
"Burn"	2016	17	35		Tribalythm
"Innosense"	2017	21	43		Tribalythm
"Howling" (featuring Granrodeo)	2018	13	26		
"Neiro" (音色)	2018	37	—		Tribalythm
"Break It Down"	2018	37	—		
"Shinsekai" (新世界)	2021	29	—		Voy✩✩✩
"United Sparrows"	2021	50	—		Voy✩✩✩
"Dice"	2021	22	—		Voy✩✩✩
"Gold"	2022	37	—		Voy✩✩✩
"Daydream Believer" (デイドリーム ビリーヴァー)(featuring Orange Range)	2022	32	—		Voy✩✩✩
"Get Back"	2023	40	—		—
"Alright!!!"	2025	—	—		
"+Encount"	2026	—	—		
"—" denotes a recording that did not chart or was not released in that territory.

==== Indie singles ====
Title	Year	JPN Oricon	Album
"Flow #0"	2001	—	Splash!!!
"Sunshine 60"	2002	—	Splash!!!
"Okuru Kotoba" (贈る言葉)	2003	6	Splash!!!
"Melos" (メロス)	2003	10	Splash!!!

==== Digital singles ====
Title	Year	JPN Oricon		Notes	Album
Title	Year	Peak position	Weeks on chart	Notes	Album
"Hikari Oikakete" (光追いかけて)	2015	—	—	Image song for the play Live Spectacle Naruto.	#10
"Oneness"	2018	—	—	Theme song for Flow Live Best 2019 at Nippon Budokan ~Kamimatsuri~.	Tribalythm
"Winter Story"	2022	—	—	Campaign song for the FM Nack5 program Winter Aloha 2023.	Voy✩✩✩
"Rekka" (烈火)	2024	—	—	Opening theme for the Japanese dub of the Chinese animation Lie Huo Jiao Chou.	—
"White Moon"	2025	—	—	3rd Opening theme for the game Code Geass: Lellouch of the Rebellion Lost Stories.	—

=== Demos ===
Title	Year	Notes
Untitled cassette tape	1999	Flow's first release, released in the spring of 1999. It contains 15 songs written by Kōshi and Take during their days as members of Pinkish, including "From 9 to 0", "Cockroach Life", and "F.A Baby".
"Let's Start!"	1999	Songs: "Millenium" (featuring Ace) and the live audio of "Cockroach Life" taken on the first show with Keigo on September 20. It is the first release to feature Keigo, and was released at a gig in Ōmiya Hearts on December 8.
"Demo Tape" (デモテープ)	2000; 2001 (MiniDisc reissue)	Songs: "BCG", "Make Yourself", "Parasite", "F.A Baby" and "From 9 to 0". It is the first release to feature Got's and Iwasaki.

=== Videos ===
==== DVDs & Blu-rays ====
Year	Title	Oricon chart	
Year	Title	Peak position	Weeks on chart
2004	The Play Off: Game 1: Released: December 1, 2004	74	—
2007	Flow Countdown Live 2006–2007 "Kizuna Factory: Differ Toshiake": Released: March 21, 2007	76	1
2008	Flow the Video: Released: September 9, 2008	24	2
2008	Flow Live Tour 2007–2008 'Isle' Final at Nippon Budokan: Released: December 24, 2008	82	2
2011	Flow First Zepp Tour 2011 'On The Line': Released: September 11, 2011	39	2
2013	Flow Video the Max!!!: Released: February 6, 2013	36	2
2013	Flow Live Tour 2013 "Tour The Max!!!!" -Grand Final- at Maihama Amphitheater: Released: December 18, 2013	59	1
2017	Flow The Live 2016: Released: March 15, 2017	20	2
2020	Flow Chokaigi 2020 "Anime-Shibari Returns" at Makuhari Messe Event Hall: Released: August 5, 2020	16 (Blu-ray); 35 (DVD)	2 (Blu-ray); 1 (DVD)
2024	Flow 20th Anniversary Special Live ~Anime Shibari Festival~: Released: February 21, 2024	—	—

==== Fanclub-limited DVDs & Blu-rays ====
Year	Title
2018	26ers The Movie
2019	26ers The Movie 2018–2019
2020	26ers The Movie 2019–2020
2021	26ers The Movie 2020–2021
2022	26ers The Movie 2021–2022
2022	Flow Honō no 12-kagetsu Renzoku Live - Jōkan: Release: July 2, 2022
2022	Flow Honō no 12-kagetsu Renzoku Live - Gekan: Release: August 26, 2022
2023	26ers The Movie 2022–2023
2024	26ers The Movie 2023–2024
2025	Flow at Billboard Live Yokohama 2025: Release: May 26, 2025
2025	26ers The Movie 2024–2025

=== Others ===
==== Compilations ====
Title	Release date	Song(s)
Fine	June 29, 2001	"Bluster"
Kōkyōshihen Eureka Seven Pocket ga Niji de Ippai Music Collection	June 24, 2009	"Days -Piano House Mix-"
Dragon Ball Z: Kami to Kami Original Soundtrack	March 27, 2013	"Hero ~Kibō no Uta~ -Short ver.-" (HERO 〜希望の歌〜 -Short ver.-), "Cha-La Head-Cha-La"
Animelo Summer Live 2013 -Flag Nine- 8.23	March 26, 2014	"Days", "Cha-La Head-Cha-La", "Go!!!"
Animelo Summer Live 2014 -Oneness- 8.30	March 25, 2015	"Go!!!", "Colors", "Ai Ai Ai ni Utarete Bye Bye Bye" (愛愛愛に撃たれてバイバイバイ)
Animelo Summer Live 2016 -Toki- 8.27	March 29, 2017	"Steppin' out", "Burn", "Kaze no Uta" (風ノ唄), "Go!!!"
Tribute of Mucc -en-	November 22, 2017	"Classic"
Animelo Summer Live 2017 -The Card- 8.25	March 28, 2018	"Innosense", "World End", "Go!!!", "7-seven-"
hide Tribute Impulse	June 6, 2018	"D.O.D. (Drink Or Die)"
Granrodeo Tribute Album "Rodeo Freak"	August 19, 2020	"modern strange cowboy"
Bandai Namco Entertainment Festival 2days Live Blu-ray	September 9, 2020	"Burn", "Kaze no Uta" (風ノ唄), "Innosense", "Colors", "World End"

==== Guest appearances ====
Year	Song	Artist(s)	Released on	Note
2011	"Let's try again!"	Team Amuse!!	Let's try again!	Collaboration of 54 talents of Amuse.
2014	"Oneness (2014 ver.)"	Idolmaster, Eir Aoi, Afilia Saga East, Angela, Wake Up, Girls!, Kanako Ito, Kensho Ono, Oldcodex, Eri Kitamura, Minami Kuribayashi, Granrodeo, Maon Kurosaki, Zaq, JAM Project, Sweet Arms, Konomi Suzuki, Star☆Ais, Takayoshi Tanimoto, Yukari Tamura, Minori Chihara, T.M.Revolution, Sayaka Nakagaya, Hitoshi Hashimoto, Fhána, Flow, Petit Milady, Yui Horie, Sachika Misawa, Nana Mizuki, Suzuko Mimori, Mamoru Miyano, μ's, May'n, YuiKaori, Aoi Yuuki, Hitomi Yoshida, LiSA, Kouji Wada	Oneness (2014 ver.)	Animelo Summer Live 2014 -Oneness- theme song.
2017	"Sore wo Tsuyosa to Yobitai (2017 ver.) - Live"	Yu Takahashi, Perfume, Flumpool, Porno Graffitti, Weaver, Shogo Sakamoto, Sakura Gakuin, Skoop On Somebody, Sakura Fujiwara, Flow	Sore wo Tsuyosa to Yobitai (2017 ver.) - Live	Theme song for Amuse Fes held in Makuhari Messe.
2018	"Sore wo Tsuyosa to Yobitai (2018 ver.) - Live"	Yu Takahashi, Perfume, Flow, Porno Graffitti, Weaver, Edoga Sullivan, Yuki Tsujimura, Sakura Fujiwara, Frederic, Rihwa, Amuse Special Band	Sore wo Tsuyosa to Yobitai (2018 ver.) - Live	Theme song for Amuse Fes held in Makuhari Messe.
2019	"Sore wo Tsuyosa to Yobitai (2019 ver.) - Live"	Porno Graffitti, Perfume, Flumpool, Yu Takahashi, s**t kingz, Sakura Fujiwara, Yuki Tsujimura, Flow, Rihwa, Skoop On Somebody, Edoga Sullivan, Weaver, Aiko Yamaide	Sore wo Tsuyosa to Yobitai (2019 ver.) - Live	Theme song for Amuse Fes held in Makuhari Messe.
2022	"Not Enough (feat. Flow)"	Back-On	Not Enough (feat. Flow)	
2023	"I Don't Wanna Die in the Paradise (feat. Flow)"	Burnout Syndromes	The WORLD is Mine	
2023	"Colors"	Afterglow x Flow	BanG Dream! Girls Band Party! Cover Collection Vol.8	Playable song in the game BanG Dream! Girls Band Party!.
2024	"Chemy x Story"	Back-on x Flow	Chemy x Story	Opening theme for Kamen Rider Gotchard performed by Back-on and Flow.
2024	"Waremonogatari"	CHiCO x Flow	CONTiNUE	
2024	"Love & Justice"	Yasuharu Takanashi x Flow	Love & Justice/Chojin	Opening theme for Kinnikuman Perfect Origin Arc performed by Yasuharu Takanashi and Flow. The song was written by Yukinojo Mori and composed by Hiroaki Suzuki.
2024	"The Future Daybreak"	Back-on x Flow	TBA	Theme song for the Kamen Rider Gotchard the Movie: The Future Daybreak.

==== Credited work ====
Year	Song	Artist	Released on	Credit
2021	"Nijiiro no Puddle" (虹色のPuddle)	Nijisanji	Palette 002 - Nijiiro no Puddle	Flow as producer and arranger; Kōshi and Keigo as lyricists; Take as composer and recording director and on guitar; Got's on bass; Iwasaki on drums
2024	"Henkaku Delight" (変革Delight)	Ayaka Ohashi	Henkaku Delight	Flow as arranger; Kōshi as lyricist; Take as composer

=== Covers ===
Year	Song	Original artist	Released on	Notes
2003	"Okuru Kotoba" (贈る言葉)	Kaientai	Okuru Kotoba	Released on January 15, 2003.
2009	"Gakuen Tengoku" (学園天国)	Finger 5	#5	Released on January 28, 2009.
2009	"Surfin' U.S.A."	The Beach Boys	Nuts Bang!!!	Released on July 22, 2009.
2011	"1/3 no Junjō na Kanjō" (1/3の純情な感情)	Siam Shade	1/3 no Junjō na Kanjō	Released on March 9, 2011. Featuring Siam Shade's lead guitarist Daita.
2013	"Cha-La Head-Cha-La"	Hironobu Kageyama	Hero ~Kibō no Uta~ / Cha-La Head-Cha-La	Released on March 20, 2013. It is used as the theme song for the theatrical film Dragon Ball Z: Battle of Gods.
2014	"Glory Days"	D✩Date	26 a Go Go!!!	Released on March 26, 2014. The original song itself was written by Kōshi and composed by Take.
2015	"Blue Bird" (ブルーバード)	Ikimonogakari	Flow Anime Best Kiwami	Released on February 25, 2015. Featuring American J-Pop singer, Diana Garnet. The original song was the third opening theme for the Naruto: Shippuden anime.
2017	"Classic"	Mucc	Tribute of Mucc -en-	Released on November 22, 2017.
2018	"D.O.D. (Drink or Die)"	hide	hide Tribute Impulse	Released on June 6, 2018.
2020	"modern strange cowboy"	Granrodeo	Granrodeo Tribute Album "Rodeo Freak"	Released digitally on May 15, 2020.
2020	"Invasion"	Com.A	Flow Chokaigi 2020 "Anime-Shibari Returns" Live at Makuhari Messe Event Hall	Released digitally on July 1, 2020. It is a rock arrangement cover of one of the Heroman anime soundtrack.
2022	"O2"	Orange Range	Daydream Believer	Released on November 16, 2022.
2023	"Haruka Kanata" (遙か彼方)	Asian Kung-Fu Generation	Flow The Cover ~Naruto Shibari~	Released digitally on June 14, 2023. Part of the "Flow x Naruto Theme Song Cover" project, in which the band covered the opening and ending themes of the Naruto anime series at the Naruto x Boruto park in Nijigen no Mori. The original song was the second opening theme for Naruto.
2023	"Viva★Rock" (ビバ★ロック)	Orange Range	Flow The Cover ~Naruto Shibari~	Released digitally on June 7, 2023. Part of the "Flow x Naruto Theme Song Cover" project. The original song was the third ending theme for the Naruto anime series.
2023	"Yurayura" (ユラユラ)	Hearts Grow	Flow The Cover ~Naruto Shibari~	The original song was the ninth opening theme for the Naruto anime series.
2023	"Hero's Come Back!!"	Nobodyknows	Flow The Cover ~Naruto Shibari~	The original song was the first opening theme for the Naruto: Shippuden anime series.
2023	"Nagareboshi ~Shooting Star~" (流れ星 ～Shooting Star～)	Home Made Kazoku	Flow The Cover ~Naruto Shibari~	The original song was the first ending theme for the Naruto: Shippuden anime series.
2023	"Closer"	Joe Inoue	Flow The Cover ~Naruto Shibari~	Released digitally on June 26, 2023. Part of the "Flow x Naruto Theme Song Cover" project. The original song was the fourth opening theme for the Naruto: Shippuden anime series.
2023	"Moshimo"	Daisuke	Flow The Cover ~Naruto Shibari~	The original song was the twelfth opening theme for the Naruto: Shippuden anime series.
2023	"Silhouette" (シルエット)	Kana-Boon	Flow The Cover ~Naruto Shibari~	Released digitally on July 26, 2023. Part of the "Flow x Naruto Theme Song Cover" project. The original song was the sixteenth opening theme for the Naruto: Shippuden anime series.
2023	"Kara no Kokoro" (カラノココロ)	Anly	Flow The Cover ~Naruto Shibari~	Part of the "Flow x Naruto Theme Song Cover" project. The original song was the twentieth and the last opening theme for the Naruto: Shippuden anime series.
2024	"Naruto Main Theme"	Musashi Project	Flow 20th Anniversary Special Live 2023 ~Anime Shibari Festival~ (Limited Edition)	Cover of one of the Naruto anime soundtrack.

== Tours ==
=== Solo concerts ===
- Hatsu One-man Live: Attack 26 (2002)
- Flow The Party: Attack 27 (2002)
- Nissan X-trail presents: Flow Free Live in Yuigahama (2003)
- 26ers 1st Anniversary Special Party!!! Kureba Wakarusa! Arigatō!!! (2005)
- Flow Request Super Live: Minna ga Erabu Chiki Chiki Ranking Countdown! (2010)
- Totsunyū The Max!!!: Zen Kyoku Mōra Honō no 5-days @ Shibuya O-nest (2012)

Guests: Azumi and Home Made Kazoku during the "Ailu The Max!!!" gig.

- Dansei Gentei Live: Otoko-Flow (2015)
- Josei Gentei Live: Onna-Flow (2015)
- Dansei Gentei Live 2017: Otoko-Flow
- Josei Gentei Live 2017: Onna-Flow
- Flow Live Best 2019 in Nippon Budokan: Kami Matsuri

Guest: Granrodeo, Real Akiba Boyz, Ginyuforce

- Flow Chōkaigi 2020: Anime Shibari Returns

Guests: Ginyuforce and Real Akiba Boyz

- Flow 20th Anniversary Special Live 2023: Anime Shibari Festival

Guests: Ayane Sakura (as Ran Mitake), Granrodeo, Hironobu Kageyama, Orange Range, Jun Fukuyama, Kaori Nazuka, Yuko Sanpei, Real Akiba Boyz, Fly-N

- 26ers 20th Anniversary Special Party!!! Kureba Wakarusa! Arigatō!!! (2023)

Bass performed by Haruna Miyoshi, as substitution for Got's.

- Anime Shibari Standing (2023)
- Flow at Billboard Live Osaka 2025

Supporting members: Hori Junichiro as keyboardist, Mai Tanizaki as violinist, Majikun as saxophonist and Tsubasa as percussionist.

- Flow at Billboard Live Yokohama 2025

Supporting members: Hori Junichiro as keyboardist, Mai Tanizaki as violinist, Majikun as saxophonist and Tsubasa as percussionist.

==== Flow The Carnival ====
Year	Title	Associated release(s)	Note	Ref.
2004	Flow The Carnival Nishi no Jin: Outdoor-hen	Game		
2004	Flow The Carnival Higashi no Jin: Indoor-hen	Game		
2005	Flow The Carnival 2005 in Hibiya Yagai Ongakudō	—N/a		
2006	Flow The Carnival 2006: Kaimakusen	Re:member		
2008	Flow The Carnival 2008: Rakuensai	—N/a	Guest: Azumi from Wyolica	
2009	Flow The Carnival 2009: Nuts Bang!!!	Nuts Bang!!!		
2014	Flow The Carnival 2014: All Star Game	—N/a		
2015	Flow The Carnival 2015 Daikanshasai	—N/a	Guest: Futoshi from Kiba of Akiba	
2017	Flow The Carnival 2017: Anime Shibari	—N/a		
2021	Flow The Carnival 2021: Shinsekai	Shinsekai	Guests: Yuriage Daiko, Yoh Ueno, Ru	
2023	Flow The Carnival 2023: Naruto Shibari	Flow The Cover: Naruto Shibari	Guest: Diana Garnet	

==== Differ Toshiake ====
Year	Title	Associated release(s)	Note
2006	Count Down Special Live "Differ Toshiake"	Flow The Best: Single Collection	Final leg of the "Kizuna Factory" tour.
2012	Flow Count Down Live 2012–2013: Toshikoshi The Max!!! (Differ Toshiake Season 2)	—N/a	
2016	Flow Count Down Live 2016–2017: Toki no Jin (Differ Toshiake Season 3)	Kaze no Uta/Burn	

==== 26ers NaNaNa Night ====
Year	Title	Associated release(s)	Note
2011	26ers NaNaNa Night Vol. 1: Yomigaeru Indie Special Night	Flow #0, Sunshine 60, Like a Rolling Snow, Splash!!!	
2012	26ers NaNaNa Night Vol. 2: Cover The Max!!!	—N/a	
2013	26ers NaNaNa Night: Flow vs. Got's with Flow	—N/a	
2014	26ers NaNaNa Night Dream Match: Anata no Yume ō Kanaemasu	—N/a	
2016	26ers NaNaNa Night: Natsu Matsuri no Jin	Kaze no Uta/Burn	
2017	26ers NaNaNa Night Vol. 7: 26ers ni Yoru 26ers no Tame no 26ers All Time Best Live	—N/a	
2018	26ers NaNaNa Night Vol. 8: Anime Igai Shibari	—N/a	
2019	26ers NaNaNa Night Vol. 9 Day 1: 26ers 15th Anniversary Live: Ashika to Oiwai~	—N/a	
2019	Flow NaNaNa Night Vol. 9 Day 2: Wakuwaku Ranran Summer Live: Ashika to Omatsuri	—N/a	
2020	26ers NaNaNa Night Vol. 10 Online: Fun Time Delivery Night	—N/a	
2024	26ers NaNaNa Night Vol. 11: Honō no 12-kagetsu Offline: Splash!!! Hen ~ Indie Kyoku ō Soete	Splash!!!, Flow #0, Sunshine 60, Like a Rolling Snow	
2025	26ers NaNaNa Night Vol. 12: Honō no 12-kagetsu Offline: Game Hen	Game	
2026	26ers NaNaNa Night Vol. 13: Honō no 12-kagetsu Offline: Golden Coast Hen	Golden Coast	

=== Solo tours ===
==== Japan tours ====
Year	Title	Associated release(s)	Note
2003	Flow Live Tour 2003: Tope con Giro	Dream Express	
2004	Flow Live Tour 2004: Tope Suicida	Ryūsei/Sharirara	
2004	Flow The Limited Circuit Kita no Jin	Game	
2004	Flow Limited Circuit Minami no Jin	Game	
2004	Flow Nenmatsu Special Tour 2004: All You Need Is Live!!!: Jōnetsu no Jiyūseki ☆ Miwaku no Shiteiseki	Life is Beautiful	
2005	Flow Live Tour 2005: The Sound Of Golden Coast	Golden Coast	
2006	Flow Live Tour 2006: Kizuna Factory	Flow The Best: Single Collection	
2007–2008	Flow Live Tour 2007–2008: Ailu	Ailu	Guest: Home Made Kazoku, during the fourth leg final gig in Tokyo.
2009	Flow Live Tour 2009: #5	#5	
2009–2010	Flow Live Tour 2009–2010: Sign	Sign	
2010	Flow Live Tour 2010: Microcosm	Microcosm	Guest: Home Made Kazoku, during the final gig in Tokyo.
2011	Flow First Zepp Tour 2011: On The Line	Flow Anime Best	
2012	Flow Live Tour 2012: Black & White	Black & White	
2013	Flow Live Tour 2013: Tour The Max!!!: Last Max!!!	Flow The Max!!!	
2013	Flow Live Tour 2013: Tour The Max!!!: Max!!! no Mukō Gawa	Flow The Max!!!	
2014	Flow Live Tour 2014 26 a Go Go!!!: Gekitō Pennant Race	26 a Go Go!!!	
2016	Flow Live Tour 2016: #10	#10	Guests: Afra and Hayate during the final leg in Tokyo.
2016	Flow Limited Circuit 2016: Kaze no Jin	Kaze no Uta/Burn	
2016	Flow Limited Circuit 2016: Honō no Jin	Kaze no Uta/Burn	
2017	Flow 15th Anniversary Tour 2017: We are still Fighting Dreamers	Fighting Dreamers	
2018	Flow×Granrodeo 1st Live Tour: Howling	Howling	A tour by Flow×Granrodeo as one unit.
2018	Flow 15th Anniversary Tour 2018: Anime Shibari	Flow The Best: Anime Shibari	Guest: Hiroshi Kitadani during the final leg in Tokyo.
2019	Flow Live Tour 2019: Tribalythm	Tribalythm	
2022	Flow Tour 2022: The Die Is Cast	Dice	
2023	Flow 20th Anniversary Live Tour 2023: Voy	Voy	Guest: Koji Yamaguchi during the Nagoya leg.
2026	Flow 26th Anniversary Tour 2026: All Time 26: 26 Kyoku Live	—N/a	

==== World tours ====
Year	Title	Countries	Associated release(s)	Note
2015	Flow World Tour 2015 Kiwami	Argentina, Brazil, Canada, Chile, Peru, Taiwan, United States, Japan	Flow Anime Best Kiwami	Guests: Ryou Sakai Project as an opening act for the Lima, Peru leg; Joe Inoue during the appearance at SANA in Fortaleza, Brazil; Diana Garnet and Granrodeo during the final leg in Tokyo.
2016	Flow Limited Circuit 2016: Chūnanbei no Jin	Brazil, Mexico	Kaze no Uta/Burn	
2018	Flow 15th Anniversary Tour 2018 "Anime-Shibari" -Latin America Tour-	Argentina, Brazil, Chile, Mexico, Peru	Flow The Best: Anime Shibari	
2022	Flow World Tour 2022	Mexico, Saudi Arabia, United States	Dice	
2024–2025	Flow World Tour "Anime Shibari 2024–2025"	Argentina, Australia, Brazil, Canada, China, Germany, Indonesia, Peru, Mexico, Switzerland, Chile, Ecuador, Spain, France, United Arab Emirates, United Kingdom, United States, Malaysia, Netherlands, Singapore, Thailand, Taiwan, Japan	—N/a	Guest: Yasuharu Takanashi, during the final of the Japan leg in Tokyo.
2025	Flow World Tour 2025 "Naruto The Rock"	Belgium, Canada, Germany, Switzerland, Spain, France, United Kingdom, United States, Italy, Netherlands, Norway, Poland, Sweden	Flow The Cover: Naruto Shibari	
2026	Flow World Tour 2026 "Naruto The Rock"	Argentina, Australia, Chile, Hong Kong, Mexico, Peru, Philippines, Singapore, Taiwan, Thailand	Flow The Cover: Naruto Shibari	

=== Online concerts ===
- Anime Shibari Online (2020)

==== Flow Special Online Live Zen Album Mōra Honō no 12-kagetsu ====
Year	Title	Streaming format	Note
2020	Vol. 1: Splash!!!	Real-time	
2020	Vol. 2: Game	Real-time	
2020	Vol. 3: Golden Coast	Pre-recorded	
2020	Vol. 4: Ailu	Real-time	Guest: Azumi
2021	Vol. 5: #5	Real-time	
2021	Vol. 6: Microcosm	Pre-recorded	
2021	Vol. 7: Black & White	Real-time	
2021	Vol. 8: Flow The Max!!!	Real-time	
2021	Vol. 9: 26 a Go Go!!!	Pre-recorded	Guest: Ginyuforce
2021	Vol. 10: #10	Pre-recorded	Guest: Afra
2021	Vol. 11: Tribalythm	Pre-recorded	
2021	The Final: Best Selection Live	Real-time	

=== Co-headlining gigs ===
- "Flow [Flow #0]" Reko Hatsu Live: Atsui Munasawagi (2001)

Guests: Gari, H, Panic or Reset

- Syakariki & Herts presents: FLOW Reko Hatsu Live (2001)

Guests: Cand Yards Jack Jam, Dekorap Crew, Dustbox, Head Phones President, Muratrix, Oyster Bed, Robin Mask

- Flow×Granrodeo 1st Live Tour "Howling" in Taiwan (2018)

In addition to featuring Flow×Granrodeo's performances as a unit, it also featured individual performances from both bands.

- Flow 2man Tour 2019–2020: VS Next Generation

Guests: Uso to Chameleon, Brian the Sun, Bentham, Novelbright, Luck Life, Spark!!Sound!!Show!!, The Boys&Girls, My Hair is Bad, She's, Oisicle Melonpan

- Flow Live in Mexico City 2026

Guest: Does

==== Flow The Party ====
Year	Title	Guest performer(s)	Associated release(s)	Note
2002	Flow The Party: Attack 28	Rottengraffty, Source	—N/a	
2002	Flow The Party: Attack 29	Full Monty, Landscape	Sunshine 60	
2002	Flow The Party: Attack 30	Possibility, Source	Like a Rolling Snow	
2003	Flow The Party: Winter Collection	2BL, Dustbox	Okuru Kotoba	
2003	Flow The Party Tour	Back Dommest, Bakuretsu Haze, Duo Hoop, Kotobuki, Side Line, Yamatosei Geronimo & Love Guerrilla Experience, Almighty Bomb Jack, Chubu Track, Masa Band, Over Limit, #18, Marsas Sound Machine, Orange Range, Ska Shippe	Splash!!!	
2010	Flow The Party 2010	Possibility, Snail Ramp, Rottengraffty, Uzumaki, Glory Jackpot System, Hundred Percent Free	—N/a	
2011	Flow The Party 2011	2gMonkeyz, A.F.R.O, Piko, The Yatō, Spyair, Totalfat, The Kanmuri, Sadie	—N/a	
2012	Flow The Party 2012: Taiban The Max!!!	Kanojo in the Display, Sowlkve, Ao, Home Made Kazoku, Aqua Timez, Brand New Vibe, Flip, Three Lights Down Kings, Orange Range, Scandal	—N/a	
2013	Flow The Party 2013	Granrodeo, Home Made Kazoku, Rookiez Is Punk'd, Cinema Staff, Huwie Ishizaki, Duff	—N/a	
2014	Flow The Party 2014	A.F.R.O, Selfarm, Funkist, Six of Sprites, Back-On, Solid Red Style, Mucc, Oto×Air, Granrodeo, The Challenge	—N/a	
2018	15th Anniversary Live: Flow The Party 2018	Totalfat, Anger Jully The Sun, Knock Out Monkey, Leetspeak Monsters, Xmas Eileen, Solomon, Ren, Everlong, Rottengraffty, Innosent in Formal, The Bonez, Ros	—N/a	
2024	Flow The Party 2024	Frederic, Spark!!Sound!!Show!!, Survive Said The Prophet, Ash Da Hero, Nobodyknows, Who-ya Extended, Su-xing-cyu, Uchikubi Gokumon Dōkōkai, Does, Luck Life	—N/a	

==== Act Against AIDS in Sendai ====
Year	Guest performer(s)	Note
2013	Does, Yuriage Daiko	
2014	Lisa, Yuriage Daiko	
2015	Back-On, Yuriage Daiko	
2016	Sambomaster, Yuriage Daiko	
2017	Fhána, Yuriage Daiko	
2018	Garnidelia, Yuriage Daiko	
2019	Eir Aoi, Yuriage Daiko	

=== Self-organized festival ===
==== Flow The Festival ====
Year	Performer(s)		Note
Year	Day 1	Day 2	Note
2024	Main stage: Flow, Granrodeo, Kana-Boon, Keytalk, Masayoshi Oishi, Spyair, From Argonavis Special Band, Back-On (guest act); Side stage(s): Real Akiba Boyz, DJ Pierre Nakano, and more.	Main stage: Flow, Burnout Syndromes, Creepy Nuts, JAM Project, Orange Range, Scandal, Rookiez Is Punk'd, Chico (guest act); Side stage(s): O-Menz, DJ Caesar, and more.	It was held on June 29 and 30 in Pia Arena MM.
2025	Main stage: Flow, Argonavis, Does, ReoNa, Sambomaster, Sukima Switch, Yasuharu Takanashi & Yaiba, Akira Kushida (guest act), Ayaka Ohashi (guest act), Jin Ogasawara (guest act); Side stage(s): Madkid, DJ Kevin Mitsunaga, and more.	Main stage: Flow, Back-On, Blue Encount, Flumpool, Granrodeo OxT, Spira Spica, Jun Fukuyama (guest act), Micro & Kuro from Home Made Kazoku (guest acts); Side Stage (s): Real Akiba Boyz, DJ Kazu, Hisashi, Ash (guest act), and more.	It was held on June 14 and 15 in Pia Arena MM.
2026	Main stage: Flow, Granrodeo, Home Made Kazoku, Raise A Suilen, Survive Said The Prophet, Uchikubi Gokumon Dōkōkai, SunSet Swish, I.N.A & Kiyoshi from hide with Spread Beaver (guest acts); Side stage(s): Project Leap!, DJ Koo, Hiroshi Kitadani (guest act), and more.	Main stage: Flow, 9mm Parabellum Bullet, Angela, Chico with HoneyWorks, Frederic, Orange Range, Real Akiba Boyz & Real Akiba Band feat. Spira Spica, Arika Takarano (guest act), Fly-N (guest act), Takuma Terashima (guest act); Side stage(s): Anatashia, DJ Meguchee, and more.	It was held on June 6 and 7 in Pia Arena MM.

===== Overseas festival =====
Year	Title	Country	Performer(s)	Note
2025	Flow The Festival in Shanghai 2025	China	Flow, Blue Encount, Does, DJ Caesar	It was held on September 26 and 27 in Phase Live House.

===== Kekki Shūkai =====
Year	Title	Performer(s)	Note
2024	Flow The Festival 2024 Kekki Shūkai @ Raizeen	DJ Take, DJ Hiroto Akiya, and more.	
2025	Flow The Festival 2025: Kekki Shūkai Akihabara	DJ Take, DJ Hiroto Akiya, DJ Caesar, and more.	
2026	Flow The Festival 2026: Kekki Shūkai Akihabara	DJ Take, DJ KG, DJ Caesar, Kirari Sawamura, Mashiro Ayano, DJ Meguchee, Nano, Nano Ripe, Rookiez Is Punk'd, Project Leap!, and more.	

== Live appearances ==
=== Events/festivals ===
- A.V.E.S.T Project (2008, 2009, 2015, 2020, 2023, 2025, 2026)
- A-Nation (2004, 2006, 2013)
- Act Against AIDS (2007, 2008, 2010, 2011, 2012, 2014)
- Amuse Fes
  - BBQ in Tsumagoi: 2013
  - Amuse Fes in Makuhari: 2017, 2018, 2019
- Animax Musix (2013, 2014, 2021, 2022)
- Anime Central (2011)
- Anime Festival Asia
  - Singapore: 2011, 2012, 2014, 2017, 2023
  - Malaysia: 2012
  - Thailand: 2015
  - Indonesia: 2015
- Anime Friends
  - Brazil: 2014, 2015, 2023, 2025, 2026
  - Argentina: 2015
  - Chile: 2015
- AnimeFest (2006, 2014)
- Animelo Summer Live
  - Japan: 2013, 2014, 2016, 2017, 2022, 2025
  - Philippines: 2025
- Arabaki Rock Fest. (2003, 2023)
- Bandai Namco Entertainment Festival (2019)
- Bilibili Macro Link (2019)
- Caldera Sonic (2021)
- Comic Fiesta (2015)
- Con-Con Hong Kong (2026)
- Connichi (2019)
- Countdown Japan (2026)
- Crunchyroll Expo (2019)
- Day Of The Dead (2023, 2024)
- FanimeCon (2010, 2011)
- Freedom Nagoya (2021, 2025)
- Higher Ground (2006)
- Impactnation Japan Festival (2023)
- Japan Expo (2012)
- Japan Jam (2026)
- Jeddah Season (2022)
- Jump Music Festa (2018)
- Kawaii Kon (2026)
- Ki/oon 20 Years & Days (2012)
- Kitamae Sapporo Manga Anime Festival (2014)
- LisAni! Live (2011, 2013, 2017, 2018, 2023, 2025)
- LuckyFes (2024, 2026)
- Machi Asobi (2017, 2026)
- MBS Anime Fes (2005, 2015, 2017, 2019)
- Michinoku Anisong Fes: Eastern Gale (2017, 2018)
- Miyako Island Rock Festival (2017)
- Monster Bash (2003)
- Nagano Aniera Festa (2023, 2025, 2026)
- New Horizon Fest (2025)
- Niigata Rainbow Rock (2017)
- Oga Namahage Rock Festival (2010, 2011, 2014, 2019, 2026)
- One Fes (2024)
- Otakon (2017, 2024)
- Ozine Fest (2016)
- Pati Night (2008, 2011, 2014)
- Peaceful Love Rock Festival (2003, 2005)
- Ressaca Friends (2013)
- Rising Sun Rock Festival (2003, 2023)
- Riyadh Season (2022)
- RoxyParty (2013)
- SANA (2015, 2018, 2023, 2026)
- Sacra Music Fes.
  - Japan: 2022
  - Hong Kong: 2023
  - Malaysia: 2024
- Sanuki Rock Colosseum (2017)
- Saudi Anime Expo (2019, 2022)
- SME Music Theater (2017)
- Super-Con (2014)
- Takao Rock (2024)
- Twinkle Rock Festival (2013)
- Tug of Rock 'n Roll (2002, 2004)

=== Concerts hosted by artist ===
- A.F.R.O
  - A.F.R.O Station: Hokkaido wa Dekkai no? Tour 2014
- Abingdon Boys School
  - Match Up (2009)
- Ash Da Hero
  - Gachinko (2024)
  - Ash Da Hero 5th Anniversary Live 2026: 5 days 5-ban Shōbu
- Back-On
  - Pack Of The Future Tour (2016)
  - Bring the Noise (2022)
- BRADIO
  - Alien Circus (2023)
- ChuLa
  - ChuLa Tōmeihan Zepp Tour 2024: Kimi to Yakusoku shita Yume ō Kanaeru Tameni
- Civilian Skunk
  - Otorance (2012)
- Dempagumi.inc
  - Cosmo Tour (2018)
- Gang Parade
  - Gang Parade Say Hello! (2024)
- GNz-Word
  - Rock The Spirit (2012)
- Granrodeo
  - Round GR (2015, 2021)
  - Granrodeo Live 2023: Rodeo Jet Coaster
- Home Made Kazoku
  - Kazoku Fes. (2010, 2011)
  - Home Made Kazoku 10th Anniversary Family Jam 2013: Special Collaboration Tour
- IRabBits
  - Tobu Fes (2024)
- JAM Project
  - Japan Anisong Meeting Festival (2020)
- Keisuke Kuwata
  - The Mujintō Fes. 2006
- Keytalk
  - Keytalk × X no Hōteishiki Kono Sora ni Hibike 2-man Rhapsody: Jitsuni Omoshiroi ne (2019)
- Knock Out Monkey
  - Enbakusai (2022, 2026)
  - Knock Out Monkey Tour 2024: We Back Again
- Lacco Tower
  - Lacco Tower 2-man Tour 2019 Gonin Hayashi no Kakeochi Sawagi
  - I Rocks (2021, 2024)
- Lenny Code Fiction
  - 2nd Album Release Tour: Happy End ō Okuritai (2023)
- Luck Life
  - Luck Life Tour 2019: Now Is The Time
  - Good Luck (2023)
- Madkid
  - Future Note Fes (2024)
- May'n
  - May'n Road to 20th Anniversary: Nice to Meat You! (2024)
- Mio Yamazaki
  - Mio Fes (2019)
- Mucc
  - En (2017)
- Orange Range
  - Enb (2012)
  - Televi's Night (2016)
- Porno Graffitti
  - Romance Porno (2011)
- Rottengraffty
  - Porno Chōtokkyū (2003, 2010)
  - Rottengraffty "Walk" Tour 2013–2014
- Rookiez Is Punk'd
  - Rookiez Is Punk'd 10th Anniversary: We Are Still Not Punk'd (2016)
  - Bump On Da Style (2026)
- Shinshi Todoroku, Gekijou no Gotoku.
  - Legit (2023)
- Survive Said The Prophet
  - Magic Hour Tour (2026)
- Su-xing-cyu
  - Fuzakete Night (2023)
- Takanori Nishikawa
  - Inazuma Rock Fes (2011)
- Totalfat
  - "Evolve + Infect" Tour 2019
- Uchikubi Gokumon Dōkōkai
  - 20!+39!=59! Tour (2024)
- UMake
  - U&Make Live Fes. (2023)
- United
  - Yoko Fest (2014)
- UZMK
  - Dongima Night (2010)
  - Piss Bonanza of Badzz Head (2024)
- Vamps
  - Halloween Party (2017)
- YamaArashi
  - Shonan Oto Matsuri (2008, 2009)
    - Beach Clean (2011)
  - Gokujō Ongaku Shū Tour 2019–2020
- Yu Takahashi
  - Akita Caravan Music Fes (2017)

=== Concerts/events hosted by media franchises ===
- Dragon Ball
  - Tenkaichi Shishakai (2013)
- Eureka Seven
  - Pachislot Kōkyōshihen Eureka Seven 2: Dōnyū Zenya Karajō Rinijōre: Fan Live (2013)
- From Argonavis
  - From Argonavis Special Live 2025: Crossing Stage
- Genshin Impact
  - Genshin Concert (2022)
- Gundam and Code Geass
  - Gundam 00 × Code Geass Go! Go! 5! Fes '08 in Budokan
- Kamen Rider and Super Sentai
  - Chō Eiyūsai Kamen Rider × Super Sentai Live & Show (2024, 2025)
- Kinnikuman
  - Kinnikuman Chōjinsai (2025)
- Naruto
  - Naruto The Live (2015, 2016, 2019, 2023)
- Samurai Flamenco
  - Samurai Flamenco: Hero wa Owaranai (2014)
- Tales of
  - Tales of Festival (2016, 2017, 2023)
  - Tales of Orchestra Concert (2016)

== Media appearances ==
- CDTV Special! Toshikoshi Premium Live
  - 2017-2018: "Go!!! ~15th Anniversary Ver.~"
  - 2018-2019: "Colors", "Go!!! ~15th Anniversary Ver.~"
  - 2019-2020: "Sign"
  - 2020-2021: "Go!!!", "Sign"
  - 2021-2022: "Dice"
  - 2022-2023: "Okuru Kotoba (20th Anniversary Version)"
  - 2023-2024: "Go!!!"
  - 2024-2025: "Go!!!"
- The First Take
  - 2023: "Go!!!", "Sign"
  - 2026: "Colors", "Hero ~Kibou no Uta~"
