= 26 a Go Go =

Studio album by Flow
- Released: March 26, 2014
- Genre: Rock
- Label: Ki/oon

Flow chronology
Flow The Max (2013)	26 a Go Go (2014)	#10 (2016)

26 a Go Go is Flow's ninth studio album. The album comes into two editions: regular and limited. The limited edition includes a bonus DVD. It reached #36 on the Oricon charts and charted for 3 weeks.

Limited Edition Cover

== Track listing ==
No.	Title	Length
1.	"Introduction -collage-"	1:46
2.	"Ai Ai Ai ni Utarete Bye Bye Bye -Album Mix-"	4:10
3.	"Senkou no Uta (閃光の唄)"	3:59
4.	"Marionette"	3:14
5.	"Love Sera (ラブ☆セラ)"	3:16
6.	"Smile Smile Smile"	3:35
7.	"Tokonatsu Endless -Album version-"	4:21
8.	"Glory Days"	3:46
9.	"Someday"	4:46
10.	"Interlude -departure-"	0:44
11.	"Wanderlust (ワンダーラスト)"	3:50
12.	"Mata Au Hi Made (また逢う日まで)"	4:00
13.	"Pride"	4:20
14.	"Conclusion -pride-"	1:33

== Bonus DVD Track listing ==
No.	Title	Length
1.	"Ai Ai Ai ni Utarete Bye Bye Bye (愛愛愛に撃たれてバイバイバイ) (Music Video)"
2.	"Tokonatsu Endless (常夏エンドレス) (Music Video)"
3.	"New Album「26 a Go Go!!!」完成記念全曲紹介という名の慰労会 in 箱根"
