= Microcosm (album) =

Studio album by Flow
- Released: June 16, 2010
- Genre: Alternative rock
- Label: Ki/oon

Flow chronology
5 (2009)	Microcosm (2010)	Black & White (2012)

Limited edition cover

Studio album by Flow

Professional ratings
Review scores
Source	Rating
AllMusic	4/5 stars

MICROCOSM is Flow's sixth studio album. The album comes into two editions: regular and limited. The limited edition includes a bonus DVD. It reached #9 on the Oricon charts and charted for 5 weeks.

== Track listing ==
No.	Title	Length
1.	"-Echoes-"	1:41
2.	"Calling"	3:35
3.	"Sign"	3:57
4.	"Union"	4:32
5.	"Atmosphere"	4:40
6.	"Planetarium"	3:46
7.	"-Core-"	2:00
8.	"Freedom"	3:21
9.	"Enemy"	4:14
10.	"Soul Red"	3:41
11.	"Luna"	4:47
12.	"Tonight"	3:53
13.	"Ambiance"	4:11
14.	"TO-O-KU-E"	4:42
15.	"-F.O.E-"	1:12

=== Bonus DVD track listing ===
No.	Title	Length
1.	"Sign" (music video)
2.	"Calling" (music video)
3.	"Recording scene of Microcosm"
4.	"Radio Program "Flow no Kyaputen 26" Finale 2010.03.26 Movie ver."
5.	"Sign" (launch event at Lazona Kawasaki Plaza)
6.	"Calling" (photo shoot)
7.	"Offshoot at Musix 2010" (Okinawa International Asia Music Festival)
