= Flow The Max =

FLow The Max

Studio album by Flow
- Released: March 27, 2013
- Genre: Rock
- Label: Ki/oon Records

Flow chronology
Black & White (2012)	FLow The Max (2013)	26 a Go Go (2014)

Flow The Max is Flow's eighth studio album. The album comes into two editions: regular and limited. The limited edition includes a bonus DVD. It reached #21 on the Oricon charts and charted for 4 weeks.

Limited Edition Cover

== Track listing ==
No.	Title	Length
1.	"Hero ~Kibou no Uta~ (Hero ~希望の歌~)"	3:38
2.	"Black Market (ブラックマーケット)"	3:30
3.	"Kimi Jishin Band (君自身Band)"	4:45
4.	"Brave Blue (ブレイブルー)"	4:07
5.	"Red Hot Riot"	3:36
6.	"Toy Machine"	3:35
7.	"Won't You Stay?"	3:57
8.	"Umbrella"	4:06
9.	"On My Way"	3:40
10.	"Kanpai Hour (乾杯アワー)"	3:20
11.	"Kyuujitsu ~Renkyuu Ver.~ (休日 ~連休)"	3:09
12.	"Celebration"	4:02
13.	"Name"	4:44
14.	"Cha-La Head-Cha-La"	3:22

== Bonus DVD Track listing ==
No.	Title	Length
1.	"Brave Blue (ブレイブルー) (Music video)"
2.	"Hero ~Kibou no Uta~ (Hero ~希望の歌~) (Music video)"
3.	"Cha-La Head-Cha-La (Music video)"
4.	"Go (Live) 2012.4.14 Ki/oon 20Years and days at Liquidroom ebisu"
