= Brave Blue =

2012 single by FLOW

Single by FLOW
- Released: September 5, 2012
- Genre: Rock
- Label: Ki/oon Records

FLOW singles chronology
"Rock Climbers" (2012)	"Brave Blue" (2012)	"HERO ~Kibō no Uta~ / CHA-LA HEAD-CHA-LA" (2013)

"Brave Blue" is FLOW's twenty fourth single. Its A-Side was used as the second opening theme song for Eureka Seven: AO. The single has three editions: regular, limited, and anime. The limited edition includes a bonus DVD with extra footage including the song's music video. The anime edition has extra tracks. It reached #12 on the Oricon charts and charted for 7 weeks.

Limited Edition Cover

Anime Edition Cover

== Track listing ==
No.	Title	Length
1.	"Brave Blue (ブレイブルー)"	4:08
2.	"Kyuujitsu (休日)"	3:11
3.	"DAYS -AO MIX-"	3:43

== Anime Edition Track listing ==
No.	Title	Length
1.	"Brave Blue (ブレイブルー)"	4:08
2.	"Kyuujitsu (休日)"	3:11
3.	"DAYS"	4:11
4.	"Realize"	3:33
5.	"Brave Blue -TV size- (ブレイブルー)"	1:33
6.	"Brave Blue -Instrumental- (ブレイブルー)"	4:07

== Bonus DVD Track listing ==
No.	Title	Length
1.	"Brave Blue (ブレイブルー) (Music Video)"
2.	"Brave Blue (Off-Shot)"
