= Splash (Flow album) =

Splash!!!

Studio album by Flow
- Released: May 21, 2003
- Genre: Rock
- Label: Ki/oon Records

Flow chronology
| Splash!!! (2003) | Game (2004) |

Splash!!! is Flow's first studio album. The release has two editions: regular and limited. The limited edition includes a bonus DVD. It reached #2 on the Oricon charts and charted for 18 weeks.

== Track listing ==
| No. | Title | Length |
|---|---|---|
| 1. | "SUNSHINE 60" | 3:19 |
| 2. | "Everything all right" | 3:08 |
| 3. | "Melos (メロス)" | 4:06 |
| 4. | "Hibi Dōdō (日々道々)" | 3:19 |
| 5. | "Umi e Ikō (海へ行こう)" | 4:05 |
| 6. | "Go Places" | 5:32 |
| 7. | "Planet Walk (プラネットウォーク)" | 3:13 |
| 8. | "Sunny Side Circuit (サニーサイドサーキット)" | 3:16 |
| 9. | "Like a Rolling Snow" | 4:04 |
| 10. | "Boku ni Sasageru Ballad (僕に捧げるバラード)" | 4:16 |
| 11. | "Who Needs Baby" | 4:16 |
| 12. | "Okuru Kotoba (album version) (贈る言葉)" | 3:08 |
