= 1/3 no Junjō na Kanjō =

Single by Siam Shade

- 2007 re-release

Single by Siam Shade

from the album Siam Shade IV - Zero
- Released: November 27, 1997
- Recorded: August 1997
- Genre: Hard rock
- Length: 3:43
- Label: Sony Music Entertainment Japan
- Songwriter: Siam Shade
- Producer: Masao Akashi

Siam Shade singles chronology
"Passion" (1997)	"1/3 no Junjō na Kanjō" (1997)	"Glacial Love" (1998)

"1/3 no Junjō na Kanjō" (Japanese: 1/3の純情な感情, Hepburn: Sanbun no Ichi no Junjō na Kanjō; lit. '1/3 Pure Heart Emotion') is a song by the Japanese rock band Siam Shade. It was released as their sixth single on November 27, 1997, before being featured on their fourth studio album Siam Shade IV - Zero, released on January 21, 1998.

It was used as the sixth ending theme of the Rurouni Kenshin anime series, and is the band's best known work and best-selling single. It reached number three on the Oricon Singles Chart, and has sold over 800,000 copies. Originally released as an 8 cm CD, the single was reissued in the 12 cm CD format on November 14, 2007.

== Background and composition ==
"1/3 no Junjō na Kanjō" was originally composed after the release of the band's second album, November 1995's Siam Shade II. Guitarist Daita and vocalist Hideki were talking about what type of song is most typical of Siam Shade, and Hideki responded with "sad melodies", which led to the creation of this song. When Daita first began working with arranger Masao Akashi on the band's previous single, "Passion", they each brought collections of songs both new and old, and "1/3 no Junjō na Kanjō" was one that Daita brought. The band recorded it with Akashi at the end of August 1997.

The original version of "1/3 no Junjō na Kanjō" was quite different from the final version in that it was a mellow song with a significantly slower tempo, which Daita said reminded him of a Van Halen song. The structure and tempo were changed, with Hideki pointing out that the chorus has been placed at the beginning. Bassist Natchin and guitarist Kazuma found the drastic changes made the song feel strange, and Jun-ji said he had particular difficulty because they quickly went into recording and started with the drums. But Daita said the melody is the same and the track retains the "image" he originally had in mind. Hideki wrote the lyrics, which are pretty much the provisional ones written two years earlier. They are about the common experience of wanting to express your romantic feelings to someone, but being unable to because it will make things awkward or mess things up at work. The fraction "1/3" was chosen because it is a bit of a "toxic" phrase due to being less than half of one's emotions, and therefore acts as a hook that grabs listeners' attention. It was also the best fit rhythmically.

"1/3 no Junjō na Kanjō" was used as the sixth ending theme of the Rurouni Kenshin anime series. Mitsuhisa Hida of SPE Visual Works said that he specifically wanted to use songs that non-anime fans would want to buy. Although they were not written for the anime, Hideki said he believed the emotions he wrote about in the lyrics are straightforward and relevant to both adults and children.

The B-side, "D.D.D.", is a hard and technical song typical of Siam Shade, originally composed by Natchin. The lyrics were inspired by a doctor visit Hideki had where he disagreed with the physician; "I don't think what the doctor said was wrong, but I don't think it was right either. So, the lyrics are about living my life my own way and proving him wrong." He said the English phrase "Dead duck doctor" means the doctor was "incompetent or useless", and may be where the initials in the song title are derived.

== Music video ==
The music video for "1/3 no Junjō na Kanjō" was filmed on Mount Kirigamine in Nagano Prefecture, Japan in October 1997. It cost 13 million yen and involved a crew of approximately 30 people and three helicopters emblazoned with the Siam Shade logo. The video features the band performing the song as the helicopters circle them overhead. Inter-cut are aerial shots filmed from said helicopters. Each member is wearing sunglasses due to the strong wind caused by the helicopters flying so close to them, although Hideki managed to take his off for a few shots.

== Reception ==
"1/3 no Junjō na Kanjō" is Siam Shade's best known work and best-selling single. It reached number three on the Oricon Singles Chart, and charted for 21 weeks. The single was certified gold by the Recording Industry Association of Japan in December 1997 for sales of 200,000 copies. This number doubled in a month, and it was certified platinum for sales of 400,000 in January 1998. "1/3 no Junjō na Kanjō" was the 31st best-selling single of 1998 with 698,520 copies sold. By 2015, total sales had grown to over 800,000 copies. In a 2012 poll conducted by RecoChoku on the best theme song from the Rurouni Kenshin anime, "1/3 no Junjō na Kanjō" came in second place.

Mayu Motoike of B-Pass called "1/3 no Junjō na Kanjō" a thrilling love song, with major and minor chords that subtly intertwine to create a "fast-paced, exhilarating sound that makes your heart race". Ryutaro Hokari of OK Music praised the song as exceptionally well-crafted and found that its B-section highlights Siam Shade's signature twin vocals from Hideki and Kazuma. He wrote that as the track progresses, the contrast between the strumming and arpeggios of the twin guitars effectively color the vocal melody.

According to music writer Takuya Ito and journalist Showgun Fuyu, the massive success of "1/3 no Junjō na Kanjō" led to misconceptions about the band's music. Fuyu explained that Siam Shade subsequently began to be labelled as "pop rock" and "visual kei", despite being a serious and technical hard rock band that had moved away from the visual kei image in 1994.

== Track listing ==
All songs written and composed by Siam Shade. Arranged by Masao Akashi.

No.	Title	Length
1.	"1/3 no Junjō na Kanjō" (1/3の純情な感情)	3:43
2.	"D.D.D."	3:30
3.	"1/3 no Junjō na Kanjō (Original Karaoke)" (1/3の純情な感情 (Original Karaoke))	3:43

== Flow version ==
"1/3 no Junjō na Kanjō"

Single by Flow

from the album Anime Best
- Released: March 9, 2011
- Genre: Rock
- Length: 7:43
- Label: Ki/oon Records
- Songwriter: Siam Shade

Flow singles chronology
"Tabidachi Graffiti" (2010)	"1/3 no Junjō na Kanjō" (2011)	"Hey!!!" (2011)

Flow recorded a cover version of "1/3 no Junjō na Kanjō" for release as their twenty first single on March 9, 2011. The recording features Siam Shade's lead guitarist Daita and was included on their 2011 compilation album Anime Best. The single reached number 20 on the Oricon chart and charted for 4 weeks.

Written and composed by Siam Shade. Arranged by Flow and Daita.

No.	Title	Length
1.	"1/3 no Junjō na Kanjō" (1/3の純情な感情)	3:53
2.	"1/3 no Junjō na Kanjō (Instrumental)" (1/3の純情な感情 (Instrumental))	3:53

== Other cover versions ==
In 2010, "1/3 no Junjō na Kanjō" was covered by Mikuni Shimokawa for her album Replay! Shimokawa Mikuni Seishun Anison Cover III. Heavy metal musician Eizo Sakamoto covered it for his Super Anime Song Legend of the 1990s album in October. That same month it was covered by both Jani Lane and Acid Black Cherry for the tribute album Siam Shade Tribute, the former being an English-language version.

In 2011, it was covered by Nogod on the compilation Crush! -90's V-Rock Best Hit Cover Songs-, which was released on January 26 and features current visual kei bands covering songs from bands that were important to the '90s visual kei movement. Pop trio Buono! covered it for their album Partenza in August 2011. A cover by Venus appears in the November 2011 rhythm video game Reflec Beat Limelight.

In 2012, the song was covered by both Mr. Big singer Eric Martin and Megamasso singer Inzargi for their respective cover albums. It was also covered that year by Fest Vainqueur for the compilation album Counteraction - V-Rock covered Visual Anime songs Compilation-, which was released on May 23, 2012, and features covers of songs by visual kei bands that were used in anime.

Japanese American singer Kylee recorded an English-language version for her 2013 Japan-only Crazy for You EP. "1/3 no Junjō na Kanjō" was covered by Animetal the Second in 2016 for their second album Blizzard of Animetal the Second, and by Shō Kiryūin for his 2020 cover album Utatte Kiririnpa 2nd Season. In 2021, fictional visual kei band Fantôme Iris covered the song for the video game Argonavis from BanG Dream AAside.
