= Nogod =

Japanese visual kei heavy metal band

NoGoD
- Also known as: Shinko Shukyo Gakudan Nogod
- Origin: Tokyo, Japan
- Genres: Heavy metal; alternative metal; progressive metal
- Years active: 2005–present
- Labels: Art Pop Entertainment; King; Art Pop; CLJ (EU); Gan-Shin (EU); JPU (EU)
- Members: Dancho; K Shinno hibiki
- Past members: Somu; Kana; Aki; Karin; Kyrie
- Website: Official website

Nogod (stylized as NoGoD) is a Japanese visual kei heavy metal band formed in 2005 by vocalist Dancho. Originally named Shinko Shukyo Gakudan Nogod (Japanese: 新興宗教楽団NOGOD, Hepburn: Shinkō Shūkyō Gakudan Nōgoddo; 'New Religion Band Nogod'), the band has been using Nogod since signing to the major label King Records in 2010.

== History ==
=== 2005–2009: Formation and rise ===
The band was formed in early 2005 by vocalist Dancho, under the name Shinko Shukyo Gakudan NoGoD. They held their debut performance on October 19, at Akasaka L@n, with a lineup consisting of Dancho on vocals, Aki and Kyrie on guitar, Karin on bass, and K on drums. On November 12, the band released their first demo "Kimi ni Okuru Bukiyou de Migatte na Uta" (君に贈る不器用で身勝手な詩, A Selfish and Awkward Poem For You). They spent the rest of 2005 and the beginning of 2006 performing with other bands in Tokyo.

In July 2006, the members were signed to Art Pop Entertainment and released two singles, "Akafukyō" (赫布教; "Red Propagation") and "Kurofukyō" (黒布教; "Black Propagation"), the following month. In 2007, guitarist Aki left and was replaced by Shinno.

In April 2008, the band released their first studio album, Mugenkyō (夢幻教; "Dream Teachings"), which reached No. 6 on the Oricon Indies chart.

In February 2009, the band released their second studio album, Gokusaishiki (極彩色; "Richly Colored").

=== 2010–present: Going major ===
In November 2009, vocalist Dancho announced that the band would be making their major debut. On June 9, 2010, Nogod released their first major single, "Kakusei" (カクセイ; "Awakening"), on King Records. The song was used as the ending theme for Chūkyō TV's Futtonda.

On August 4, 2010, Nogod released their first major album, Kakera (欠片; "Fragments"), in Japan and Europe. The band kicked off a one-man tour to promote their album in Taiwan; they followed up the show with other performances throughout Tokyo.

In January 2011, Nogod began hosting their own radio show on Tokyo Bay FM. The program is titled Nogod Bless You!!! and airs every Saturday at 12:00AM.

Nogod covered Siam Shade's song "1/3 no Junjou na Kanjou" for the compilation Crush! -90's V-Rock Best Hit Cover Songs-. The album was released on January 26, 2011 and features current visual kei bands covering songs from bands that were important to the '90s visual kei movement. In July 2014, they performed at two days of the Japan Expo in Paris, France.

In January 2018, Nogod bassist Karin announced that he would leave the band after 13 years. His final performance with the band was on April 6 of that year in Tokyo at Shinjuku ReNY. Saber Tiger bassist hibiki became the band's support bassist.

In September 2021, it was announced that guitarist Kyrie would be leaving Nogod after 16 years. His final performance with the band was at Nakano Sun Plaza Hall on February 22, 2022. hibiki joined Nogod as an official member in August 2022. At the same time, former Ancient Myth guitarist Kyohei Iyoda started working with the group as a support member.

== Musical style ==
Nogod's music is based in heavy metal. Founder Dancho explained that the members were previously part of the Japanese metal scene, but he felt stifled by all the rules, "The metal field, for better or worse, places a lot of emphasis on style, and when I tried to do something new, it wasn't accepted. So I thought, 'Well, I might as well wear makeup!' and that's how I started NoGoD." Because some live houses refused to book acts that wear makeup, they had no choice but to play in visual kei venues. Dancho explained that he had always liked acts such as Kinniku Shojo Tai and Ningen Isu, but said, "in Japan, if you wear makeup and play in a band, you're lumped in with the visual kei bands." However, he made it clear that he has no problem with being labeled as such. He and Kyrie said they just wanted the freedom to play whatever they wanted. When Kyrie suggested that Dancho was more influenced by melodic hardcore and punk than metal, the singer admitted to being from the "Hi-Standard generation", but explained, "I love metal, and there is a metallic taste in our basic elements. But we listened to a rich variety of music in the '90s. There was a lot of Japanese music, and a lot of foreign music was coming in. Those elements naturally made their way into our music." In 2025, Tomoyuki Mori of Real Sound said that Nogod's sound at the time seemed to be a mix of metal from different eras and the members agreed, with Hibiki saying, "It's true that we're not the latest, but it's not old heavy metal either" and noted that there are elements of metalcore.

Nogod's songs such as "Kakusei" (カクセイ; "Awakening") have been praised for the technical skill that the band has exhibited. Dancho said that, before 2014's Make A New World, they had only made concept albums. He also said that he prefers the Japanese language over English, and does not like songs that make listeners sad; "I just want them to feel better."

== Members ==
- Dancho (団長) – vocals (2005–present)
- K – drums (2005–present)
- Shinno – guitar (2007–present)
- hibiki – bass (2022–present)

Former members

- Somu (想夢) – guitar (left July 2005)
- Kana – bass (left October 2005)
- Aki (アキ) – guitar (2005–2007)
- Karin (華凛) – bass, screams (2005–2018)
- Kyrie – guitar, backing vocals (2005–2022)

== Discography ==
=== Studio albums ===
- Mugenkyō (夢幻教; "Dream Teachings") (2008.04.09)
- Gokusaishiki (極彩色; "Richly Colored") (2009.02.25)
- Kakera (欠片; "Fragments") (2010.08.04)
- Genjitsu (現実; "Reality") (2011.08.03)
- V (2013.02.06)
- Make A New World (2014.09.17)
- Renovate (2016.03.30)
- Proof (2017.08.20)
- NoW Testament (2023.04.21)

=== Mini albums ===
- Kanna Fukyou (神無布教; "Godless Propagation") (2006.12.06)
- Rashinban (羅針盤; "Compass") (2009.09.23)
- Shingeki (神劇) (2019.04.10)

=== Compilation albums ===
- Indies Best Selection 2005-2009 (2010.03.03)
- Voyage ~ 10th Anniversary Best Album (2015.04.08)

=== Singles ===
- "Kimi ni Okuru Bukiyou de Migatte na Uta" (君に贈る不器用で身勝手な詩; "A Selfish and Awkward Poem For You") (2005.11.12)
- "Sakura/Kimi wa Tsuki o Tsukamu" (櫻/君は月を掴む; "Cherry Blossoms/You Caught the Moon") (2006.04.09)
- "Akafukyō" (赫布教; "Red Propagation") (2006.07.12)
- "Kurofukyō" (黒布教; "Black Propagation") (2006.08.30)
- "Atria" (2007.05.09)
- "Ten" (天; "Heaven") (2007.08.08)
- "Batsu" (罰; "Punishment") (2007.09.26)
- "「Ten」 「Bastu」 Enban" (「天」「罰」円盤; "Divine Punishment Disc") (2007.09.26)
- "Saikou no Sekai/Shirasagi" (最高の世界/白鷺; "The Best World / White Heron") (2008.02.16)
- "Yume no Tsuzuki" (夢の続き; "Continued Dreams) " (2008.07.13)
- "Midori no Kaze" (碧の風-ミドリノカゼ-; "The Green Wind") (2008.10.08)
- "Ao no Daichi" (碧の大地-アヲノダイチ-; "The Blue Ground") (2008.11.05)
- "Mr.Heaven" (2009.07.25)
- "Kakusei" (カクセイ; "Awakening") (2010.06.09)
- "Raise a Flag" (2011.04.06)
- "Kamikaze" (神風; "Divine Wind") (2011.07.06)
- "Love?" (2012.02.19)
- "Stand Up!" (2012.10.10)
- "Shinzui -Frontier-" (神髄 -FRONTIER-) (2013.07.24)
- "Shinzui -The Power-" (神髄 -THE POWER-) (2013.09.18)
- "Helix" (2020.01.08, sold only at concerts)
- "I.A.N" (2022.11.25, sold only at concerts)

=== DVDs ===
- Daisakkai (大殺界; "Big Unfavorable Karma") (2006.06.20)
- Tandoku Dai Fukyō -22222- Tenchūsatsu Nakano Sunplaza Hall 2022.4.28 (単独大布教-22222- 天中殺 Nakano Sunplaza Hall 2022.4.28) (2022.08.24)

=== Other ===
- "No God" on Loop of Life 6 (2006.06.28)
- "Kimi ni Okuru Bukiyou de Migatte na Uta" on Ura★Kaizoku Ban No.003 (「裏★海賊盤。」No.003; "Inside Bootleg") (2006.09.15)
- "Guren" on Shock Edge 2006 (2006.10.10)
- Cover of Siam Shade's "1/3 no Junjou na Kanjou" on Crush! -90's V-Rock Best Hit Cover Songs- (2010.01.26)
