= Arigatō (Flow song) =

"Arigatou"

Single by FLOW
- Released: February 20, 2008
- Genre: Rock
- Label: Ki/oon Records

FLOW singles chronology
"Fuyu no Amaoto / Night Parade" (2007)	"Arigatou" (2008)	"WORD OF THE VOICE" (2008)

"Arigatou" is FLOW's fourteenth single. It reached #25 on the Oricon charts in its first week and charted for 7 weeks. *

== Track listing ==
No.	Title	Length
1.	"Arigatou (ありがとう)"	5:29
2.	"Tabibito (旅人)"	4:58
3.	"Arigatou -Instrumental-"	5:28
