= Ai Ai Ai ni Utarete Bye Bye Bye =

Single by FLOW
- Released: February 26, 2014
- Genre: Rock
- Label: Ki/oon Records
- Songwriter(s): Asakawa Kohshi, Asakawa Takeshi

FLOW singles chronology
"Tokonatsu Endless" (2013)	"Ai Ai Ai ni Utarete Bye Bye Bye" (2014)

Ai Ai Ai ni Utarete Bye Bye Bye is FLOW's twenty seventh single. Its A-Side was used as the second opening theme song for the anime Samurai Flamenco. The single has two editions: regular and limited. The limited edition includes a bonus DVD. It reached number 44 on the Oricon charts and charted for three weeks. *

Limited Edition Cover

== Track listing ==
No.	Title	Length
1.	"Ai Ai Ai ni Utarete Bye Bye Bye (愛愛愛に撃たれてバイバイバイ)"	4:13
2.	"FROGS ~Keronpa Teikoku no Gyakushu~ (FROGS ～ケロンパ帝国の逆襲～)"	4:45
3.	"SAMURYMAFLO 2014 (サムライムアフロ2014)"	3:35
4.	"Ai Ai Ai ni Utarete Bye Bye Bye (愛愛愛に撃たれてバイバイバイ) -TV Size-"	1:36
5.	"Ai Ai Ai ni Utarete Bye Bye Bye (愛愛愛に撃たれてバイバイバイ) -Instrumental-"	4:11

== Bonus DVD Track listing ==
No.	Title	Length
1.	"FROGS ~Keronpa Teikoku no Gyakushu~ (FROGS ～ケロンパ帝国の逆襲～) (Music Video)"
2.	"FROGS ~Keronpa Teikoku no Gyakushu~ (FROGS ～ケロンパ帝国の逆襲～) (Music Video Making)"
