= Detective School Q =

Japanese manga series and its adaptations

- First tankōbon volume cover

探偵学園Q (Tantei Gakuen Kyū)
- Genre: Mystery
- Manga
- Written by: Seimaru Amagi
- Illustrated by: Fumiya Satō
- Published by: Kodansha
- Magazine: Weekly Shōnen Magazine
- Original run: May 23, 2001 – July 20, 2005
- Volumes: 22
- Anime television series
- Directed by: Noriyuki Abe
- Produced by: Andrew Tamon Niwa; Tetsuo Gensho; Ken Hagino
- Written by: Makoto Hayashi
- Music by: Daisuke Ikeda
- Studio: Pierrot
- Original network: JNN (TBS)
- English network: SA: Animax; SEA: Animax Asia
- Original run: April 15, 2003 – March 20, 2004
- Episodes: 45
- Television drama
- Directed by: Jun Ishio; Ryuichi Inomata; Kyoji Otsuka; Masato Kuraibe
- Produced by: Takeya Kuwahara; Takayuki Akimoto
- Written by: Tetsuya Oishi; Yusuke Watanabe
- Music by: Kei Yoshikawa
- Studio: AVEC
- Original network: Nippon TV
- Original run: July 3, 2007 – September 11, 2007
- Episodes: 11
- icon

Detective School Q (Japanese: 探偵学園Q, Hepburn: Tantei Gakuen Kyū) is a Japanese manga series written by Seimaru Amagi and illustrated by Fumiya Satō (the creators of The Kindaichi Case Files). It was originally serialized in Kodansha's Weekly Shōnen Magazine between May 2001 and July 2005, with its chapters collected in 22 tankōbon volumes. A 45-episode anime television series by Pierrot was broadcast on TBS from April 2003 to March 2004.

== Plot ==
Detective School Q is the story of a group of young students from Class Q of Dan Detective School (DDS), a prestigious and renowned detective academy founded by Morihiko Dan, the most famous detective in Japan, and the adventures and mysteries they unfold and solve together. They eventually work against Pluto (冥王星, Meiosei), a mysterious organization which creates almost fool-proof plans that only a handful of detectives can solve.

== Characters ==
Kyū Renjō (連城 究, Renjō Kyū)
Voiced by: Megumi Ogata
Portrayed by: Ryūnosuke Kamiki
Kyū is a bright, optimistic, and highly skilled detective who serves as the leader of Class Q. Known for his logical reasoning and sharp judgment, he openly supports Ryū when others distrust him. He harbors affection for Meg, often teasing her while deeply caring for her. Raised as an only child by his mother, Kyū was unaware that his mentor during childhood was actually his father, Satoru Renjō—Morihiko Dan's partner and right-hand man. Renjō had secretly married Kyū's mother to protect them from the dangers of his profession. After rescuing Kyū from a kidnapping at age five, Renjō later died, prompting Kyū's mother to conceal the truth for years. Once Kyū joined the DDS, she ultimately chose to support his pursuit of detective work.
Ryū Amakusa (天草 流, Amakusa Ryū)
Voiced by: Kōichi Tōchika
Portrayed by: Ryosuke Yamada
Ryū is the grandson of King Hades, founder of Pluto, who sent him to DDS after his parents' death. Raised by Pluto, he bears the organization's mark on his neck. Isolated in his youth, he saw his home as a prison, shaping his reserved demeanor. Despite his cold exterior, he bonds with Class Q, particularly Kyū, the first to truly understand him. Though more naturally skilled, Ryū acknowledges Kyū's superior detective abilities, attributing them to his persistence and dedication. Ryū suffers from amnesia regarding his childhood, a condition later revealed to be induced by hypnosis. Kyū uncovers his Pluto connection but keeps it secret while aiding his search for the truth. After the hypnosis is lifted, King Hades removes the final mental block, deeming his plan a failure. Ryū then recalls his father's survival and reunites with him.
Megumi Minami (美南 恵, Minami Megumi) / "Meg" (メグ, Megu)
Voiced by: Hōko Kuwashima
Portrayed by: Mirai Shida
Megumi, commonly known as Meg, is a member of Class Q with an eidetic memory, enabling her to instantly memorize scenes and detect altered evidence. She harbors romantic feelings for Kyū, but Kyū teasingly reciprocates. She previously studied at the Tokyo National Talent Development Research Center alongside Yutaka Saburōmaru and currently lives with her university-student sister, Akane, as her parents work abroad. Upon first meeting Ryū, Meg senses familiarity despite being unable to recall him—an anomaly given her photographic memory. After recovering suppressed memories, she remembers they both attended the Tokyo National Talent Development Research Center.
Kazuma Narusawa (鳴沢 数馬, Narusawa Kazuma)
Voiced by: Tomoko Kawakami
Portrayed by: Naruki Matsukawa (live-action special), Katsumi Wakaba (live-action drama)
Kazuma is a renowned computer game programmer who assists Class Q with his ever-present laptop. Initially dissatisfied with Class Q's perceived inferior status, he attempts to transfer to Class A but chooses to remain after his classmates support him during a crisis. He maintains a friendly rivalry with Kinta, frequently exchanging jokes while differing in investigative methods. Though a prodigy, Kazuma initially relies on his "lucky" hat for correct deductions but eventually overcomes this dependence.
Kintarō Tōyama (遠山 金太郎, Tōyama Kintarō)
Voiced by: Hideo Ishikawa
Portrayed by: Jun Kaname
Commonly known as Kinta (キンタ), he is the son of a prominent police officer but lives independently after a family dispute, working various part-time jobs. As Class Q's strongest member, he trains in judo, kendo, and karate, possessing exceptional eyesight and olfactory senses. Kinta frequently ridicules Kazuma's technological methods, favoring instinctual detective work instead. His physical prowess and acute senses prove valuable during investigations.
Morihiko Dan (団 守彦, Dan Morihiko)
Voiced by: Hideyuki Tanaka
Portrayed by: Takanori Jinnai
Dan is the founder and principal of DDS, a renowned detective licensed as Japan's only private investigator permitted to carry firearms. A former police officer, he established Dan Detective Company (DDC) and its subsidiary DDS, developing both into elite institutions with the help of his protégé Satoru Renjō. Their most formidable adversary, the criminal organization Pluto, was seemingly destroyed at great cost—Renjō perished and Dan was left permanently unable to walk. When signs emerge of Pluto's resurgence, the aging Dan creates Class Q, selecting exceptional students to train as potential successors. He intends to evaluate their abilities and appoint his replacement from among them.
Shino Katagiri (片桐 紫乃, Katagiri Shino)
Voiced by: Aya Hisakawa
Portrayed by: Sawa Suzuki
The loyal assistant of Dan, she assisted Meg, Kyū and Kinta in getting admitted to DDS, having met them during a case.
Shintarō Maki (真木 慎太郎, Maki Shintarō)
Voiced by: Ken Narita
Portrayed by: Toshihide Tonesaku
DDS's head of forensics, Maki is both a skilled teacher and doctor, and is quite intelligent in his knowledge of medical and forensic science.
Kōtarō Nanami (七海 光太郎, Nanami Kōtarō)
Voiced by: Shin-ichiro Miki
Portrayed by: Tarō Yamamoto
Nanami serves as Dan's trusted assistant, specializing in disguise. He frequently monitors Class Q by posing as suspects during investigations. Though typically carefree—often demonstrating new disguises, including his signature cactus costume with a sombrero—he becomes serious when required. Dan primarily assigns him to protect Class Q during Pluto-related cases.
Yutaka Saburōmaru (三郎丸 豊, Saburōmaru Yutaka)
Voiced by: Nobuo Tobita
Portrayed by: Akiyoshi Nakao
Saburōmaru is an arrogant Tokyo University student who enjoys boasting about his "superiority". He thinks that he will be a qualified detective. Although he has an IQ of 180, he seems too inept in solving mysteries. Saburōmaru is initially in Class A after joining DDS, but later gets demoted to Class B. He knows Meg via the Tokyo National Talent Development Research Center and has a crush on her older sister Akane.
King Hades (キング・ハデス, Kingu Hadesu)
Voiced by: Gorō Naya
King Hades, born Hoshihiko Kokuō (黒王 星彦, Kokuō Hoshihiko), is Pluto's founder and Ryū's grandfather. The illegitimate son of artist Takumi Kuzuryū and criminal Yurika Kokuō, he retaliated against childhood bullies with an arson disguised as an accident. After rejecting Dan's friendship, he was imprisoned by Takumi in the "House of Dragon" basement, where he scarred his face and kept a blood diary before escaping and killing his father. As Pluto's leader, he attempts to groom Ryū through manufactured despair, but ultimately dies in a fire when his plan fails.

== Media ==
=== Manga ===
Detective School Q, written by Seimaru Amagi and illustrated by Fumiya Satō, was serialized in Kodansha's Weekly Shōnen Magazine between May 23, 2001, (Note: It started in the magazine's 25th issue of 2001 (cover date June 6), released on May 23 of the same year.) to July 20, 2005. (Note: It finished in the magazine's 34th issue of 2005 (cover date August 3), released on July 20 of the same year.) Kodansha collected its chapters in 22 tankōbon volumes, released from September 17, 2001, to October 17, 2005.

=== Anime ===
A 45-episode anime television series adaptation, animated by Pierrot and directed by Noriyuki Abe, was broadcast on TBS from April 15, 2003, to March 20, 2004. The episodes were collected in twelve DVD sets, released by Marvelous Entertainment between August 23, 2003, and July 24, 2004. The series' first opening theme (episodes 1–21) is "MeiQ!? – Meik Yū – Make You" (迷Q!?-迷宮-MAKE★YOU), performed by Hayami Kishimoto; the second (episodes 22–34) and third opening theme (episodes 35–45) are "Luvly, Merry-Go-Round" and "100% Pure", respectively, both performed by Pipo Angels. The first ending theme (episodes 1–11) is "Koigokoro" (恋ごころ; 'My Love') performed by Akane Sugazaki; the second ending theme (episodes 12–21) is "Nijiiro ni Hikari Umi" (虹色にひかる海; 'The Rainbow-colored Sea') performed by Aiko Kitahara; the third (episodes 22–34) and fourth ending theme (episodes 35–45) are "Mienai Story" (みえないストーリー, Mienai Sutōrī; 'Invisible Story') and "Kaze ni Mukai Aruku Youni" (風に向かい歩くように; 'Like Walking towards the Wind'), respectively, both performed by Hayami Kishimoto.

=== Drama ===
A two-hour special television drama adaptation was broadcast on Nippon TV on July 1, 2006. An eleven-episode television drama adaptation series was broadcast on Nippon TV from July 3 to September 11, 2007. The opening theme is "Answer" by Flow, while the ending theme was "Stand By Me" by the brilliant green.
