= Answer (Flow song) =

Single by FLOW
- Released: August 1, 2007
- Genre: Rock
- Label: Ki/oon

FLOW singles chronology
| "COLORS" (2006) | "Answer" (2007) | "Fuyu no Amaoto / Night Parade" (2007) |

"Answer" is FLOW's twelfth single. The title track was used as opening theme song for the live action Detective School Q television series. It reached #7 on the Oricon charts in its first week and charted for 12 weeks.

== Track listing ==
| No. | Title | Length |
|---|---|---|
| 1. | "Answer" | 4:40 |
| 2. | "Electric circus" | 4:45 |
| 3. | "Steppers high" | 3:22 |
| 4. | "Answer -Instrumental-" | 4:40 |
