= Snow Flake (Kioku no Koshitsu) / Pulse =

"Snow Flake ~Kioku no Koshitsu~ / Pulse"

Single by FLOW
- Released: December 12, 2008
- Genre: Rock
- Label: Ki/oon Records

FLOW singles chronology
"WORLD END" (2008)	"Snow Flake ~Kioku no Koshitsu~ / Pulse" (2008)	"Sign" (2010)

Snow Flake ~Kioku no Koshitsu~ / Pulse is FLOW's seventeenth single. PULSE was the official image song of the world’s biggest snowboard event "X-TRAIL JAM in TOKYO DOME ‘08." It reached #24 on the Oricon charts in its first week and charted for 4 weeks. *

== Track listing ==
No.	Title	Length
1.	"Snow Flake ~Kioku no Koshitsu~ (記憶の固執)"	4:28
2.	"PULSE"	3:39
3.	"Phantom"	4:02
