= Dream Express (song) =

Single by FLOW
- Released: September 18, 2003
- Genre: Rock
- Label: Ki/oon Records
- Songwriter(s): Kōshi Asakawa, Hiroshi Iwasaki

FLOW singles chronology
"Blaster" (2003)	"Dream Express" (2003)	"Ryūsei / Sharirara" (2004)

Dream Express is FLOW's second single. It reached #9 on the Oricon charts in its first week and charted for 9 weeks. *

== Track listing ==
No.	Title	Writer(s)	Length
1.	"Dream Express (ドリームエクスプレス)"	Kōshi Asakawa, Hiroshi Iwasaki	4:10
2.	"Saiken (再見)"	Kōshi Asakawa, Keigo Hayashi	3:42
3.	"ATTACK 26"		2:07
