= Rottengraffty =

Japanese rock band

- Origin: Kyoto Prefecture, Japan
- Genres: Alternative rock; punk rock; electronic rock; post-hardcore; nu metal
- Years active: 1999–present
- Labels: Bellwood/King; Inferno/Universal; Pine Fields; Getting Better/Victor
- Members: Nobuya; Naoki; Kazuomi; Yuichi; Hiroshi
- Website: rotten-g.com

Rottengraffty (Japanese: ロットングラフティー, Hepburn: Rottongurafutī; stylized as ЯOTTENGR∀FFTY) is a Japanese rock band from Kyoto Prefecture, formed in 1999. Their musical style mixes alternative rock, heavy metal, electronica, hip hop and reggae. They have had several top ten albums and several top twenty singles on the Oricon charts.

== History ==
Rottengraffty formed as a five-piece rock band with two vocalists in 1999. The mini-album Radical Peace × Radical Genocide was released on Bellwood, a sub label of King Records in 2001. After releasing Ekisapiko in 2005, Rottengraffty left King Records. In 2006, they released the single "Mandāra" on Inferno Records, a sub label of Universal created by J.

In 2010, the band switched from writing their name in katakana, to writing it in English. The album This World was released by Pine Fields Recordings that year. After signing to Victor Entertainment's Getting Better Records, Rottengraffty released the mini-album Life is Beautiful on 7 October 2015. It reached number 6 on the Oricon Albums Chart. However, it was announced on 29 December that distribution of the mini-album would be discontinued due to issues with the rights to its songs.

Their 2017 single, "70cm Shiho no Madobe", was used as the 10th ending theme song for the Dragon Ball Super anime. On 9 September 2020, it was announced that guitarist and programmer Kazuomi would be refraining from live performances due to poor health. On 15 March 2022, the band announced he was stepping away from live performances permanently and will work as their "sound producer".

== Members ==
- Nobuya Murase (村瀬 展弥) – vocals
- Naoki Makizawa (牧沢 直樹; stage name stylized as "N∀OKI") – vocals
- Kazuomi Nakakita (仲北 和臣) – guitar, programming
- Yuichi Adachi (安達 友一; stage name spelled 侑威地) – bass
- Hiroshi Nakama (中間 弘士) – drums

== Discography ==
=== Studio albums ===
- Classick (stylized as "CL∀SSICK") – 2004
- Ekisapiko (えきさぴこ) – 2005
- This World – 2010
- Familiarize – 2011
- Walk – 2013
- Play – 2018
- Hello – 2022
- Wabi Sabi (わびさび) – 2025

=== Mini-albums ===
- Radical Peace × Radical Genocide – 2001
- Grind Vibes – 2002
- Synchronicitizm – 2003
- Life is Beautiful – 2015
- Goodbye to Romance – 2021

=== Singles ===
- "Warudakumi ~ Merry Christmas Mr.Lawrence" (悪巧み〜Merry Christmas Mr.Lawrence) – 2003
- "E for 20" – 2004
- "Mandāra" (マンダーラ) – 2006
- "D.A.N.C.E." – 2012
- "Sekai no Owari" (世界の終わり) – 2014
- "So... Start" – 2016
- "70cm Shiho no Madobe" (「70cm四方の窓辺」) – 2017
- "Hallelujah" (ハレルヤ) - 2019
- "Towa to Kage" (永遠と影) - 2020
- "Goodbye to Romance" (表題曲) - 2021
- "Akizakura" (秋桜) - 2022
- "Akatsuki Identity" (暁アイデンティティ) - 2024

=== Limited singles ===
- "Bō izu Dead" (暴イズDEAD) – 2001
- "Chaos in Terminal" – 2005
- "Palm" – 2006
- "Form" – 2006
- "Maido Ookini" (まいどおおきに) – 2008

=== Demos ===
- "Noise Performance Attitude"
- "Destrocker's Revolution"

=== Compilation albums ===
- Silver – 2011
- Gold – 2011
- You are Rottengraffty - 2020

=== Tribute albums ===
- Rottengraffty Tribute Album ~Mouse Trap~ - 2019

=== Home videos ===
- Chaos in Terminal – 2006
- Tour 2010 This World ~Kyoto Muse 2 Days~ – 2010
- Silver & Gold – 2012
- Walk..... This Way - 2014
- Play All Around Japan Tour 2018 in Nippon Budokan - 2018
- Rottengraffty Live in Tō-ji - 2020
- Rottengraffty in Billboard Live Osaka ~Goodbye to Romance Tour 2021~ - 2021
