= Calling (Flow song) =

"CALLING"

Single by FLOW
- Released: May 12, 2010
- Genre: Rock
- Label: Ki/oon Records
- Songwriter(s): Kōshi Asakawa, Takeshi Asakawa

FLOW singles chronology
"Sign (Flow song)" (2010)	"CALLING" (2010)	"Tabidachi Graffiti" (2010)

CALLING is FLOW's nineteenth single. Its A-Side was used as the first ending theme song for Heroman. The single has two editions: regular and limited. The limited edition includes a bonus DVD with extra clips including its music video. It reached #21 on the Oricon charts and charted for 3 weeks. *

Limited Edition Cover

== Track listing ==
No.	Title	Length
1.	"CALLING"	3:36
2.	"FREEDOM"	3:24
3.	"Around the world -Shin Seikatsu Ouen Mix-"	5:23
4.	"CALLING -HEROMAN Ending Mix-"	1:34
5.	"CALLING -Instrumental-"	3:34

== Bonus DVD Track listing ==
No.	Title	Length
1.	"CALLING (MUSIC VIDEO)"
2.	"CALLING (Music Video Making Movie)"
3.	""HEROMAN" -Debut Trailer- ("CALLING" ver.)"
