= Sign (Flow song) =

Single by FLOW
- Released: January 13, 2010
- Genre: Hard rock; punk rock; emo
- Label: Ki/oon Records
- Songwriter: Takeshi Asakawa

FLOW singles chronology
"Snow Flake ~Kioku no Koshitsu~ / Pulse" (2008)	"Sign" (2010)	"CALLING" (2010)

Sign is FLOW's eighteenth single. Its A-Side was used as the sixth opening theme song for Naruto Shippuden. The single has two editions: regular and limited. The limited edition includes a bonus CD with extra tracks, a wide cap sticker, double-sided jacket, and Sharingan sticker. It reached number 4 on the Oricon charts in its first week and charted for 6 weeks. The song was performed on The First Take in February 2023.

Limited Edition Cover

== Track listing ==
No.	Title	Length
1.	"Sign"	3:58
2.	"Nowhere ~Kimi ni Okuru Orera Nari no Ouenka~ (君に贈る俺らなりの応援歌))"	4:12
3.	"Bring it on! -Reggaeton Mix-"	3:09
4.	"Sign -NARUTO Opening Mix-"	1:33
5.	"Sign -Instrumental-"	3:54

== Limited edition track listing ==
No.	Title	Length
1.	"Sign"	3:58
2.	"Nowhere ~Kimi ni Okuru Orera Nari no Ouenka~ (君に贈る俺らなりの応援歌))"	4:12
3.	"FLOWxNARUTO -Time machine Special Mix-"
4.	"Sign -NARUTO Opening Mix-"	1:33
5.	"Sign -Instrumental-"	3:54

== Bonus DVD track listing ==
No.	Title	Length
1.	"Sign (MUSIC VIDEO)"
2.	"Sign (NARUTO Mix Ver.) (MUSIC VIDEO)"
3.	"Sign (Making-of)"
