= Blaster (song) =

Single by FLOW
- Released: July 2, 2003
- Genre: Rock
- Label: Ki/oon Records
- Songwriter(s): Keigo Hayashi, Kōshi Asakawa, Takeshi Asakawa, Hiroshi Iwasaki, Yasutarō Gotō

FLOW singles chronology
"Blaster" (2003)	"Dream Express" (2003)

Blaster was FLOW's first major debut single after signing with Ki/oon Records. It reached #12 on the Oricon charts in its first week and charted for 6 weeks. *

== Track listing ==
No.	Title	Length
1.	"Blaster (ブラスター)"	3:24
2.	"Nostalgia (ノスタルジア)"	4:24
3.	"From 9 to 0"	1:57
