= Go (Flow song) =

"Go!!!"

Single by Flow

from the album GAME
- Released: April 28, 2004
- Genre: Pop-punk, hard rock, rap rock
- Label: Ki/oon Records

Flow singles chronology
"Ryūsei / Sharirara" (2004)	"Go!!!" (2004)	"Life is beautiful" (2004)

"Go!!!" is a song by Japanese rock band FLOW, released on April 28, 2004, as their fourth single. The song serves as the fourth opening theme song of the popular Japanese anime Naruto. It reached #6 on the Oricon charts in its first week where it stayed on the Oricon's Top 10 for 3 straight weeks. It charted for 22 weeks in total.

== Track listing ==
No.	Title	Length
1.	"Go!!!"	3:59
2.	"Rising Dragon"	3:18
3.	"My Life"	3:43
4.	"Go!!! ~Vocaless Mix~"	4:00
5.	"Go!!! ~Naruto Opening Mix~"	1:35

== Covers ==
The song was covered by Argonavis, a fictional rock band from multimedia franchise Argonavis from BanG Dream! during their pre-debut live Argonavis 0-2nd LIVE -The Beginning- held on September 15, 2018. It was playable in the game Argonavis from BanG Dream! AAside on January 14, 2021 while the full version is included on "Argonavis Cover Collection -Mix-", released on November 17, 2021.
