= Ozine Fest =

Anime convention in the Philippines

- Status: Active
- Genre: Anime
- Venue: SM Megatrade Hall (2007-present)
- Location: Mandaluyong
- Country: Philippines
- Inaugurated: December 2005
- Organizer: PSICOM Publishing, Inc. (Otakuzine Anime Magazine)
- Website: http://www.ozine.events/

Ozine Fest is an annual anime convention organized by the editorial committee of Otakuzine Anime Magazine, a local anime magazine published in the Philippines by PSICOM Publishing, Inc. (Now as merged and jointly owned by Viva Entertainment as Viva PSICOM Publishing Corporation). The event features mainstream activities such as cosplay competition, exhibition booths, band tournament, Japanese karaoke contests and art contests.

== History ==
Ozine Fest was first held at Robinsons Galleria on December 16, 2005, where 3,752 tickets were reportedly sold. It followed a year later and was held at the Le Pavillon, Metropolitan Park on July 30, 2006.

On April 1, 2007, the third Ozine Fest was held at a new venue, the Megatrade Hall of SM Megamall in Mandaluyong. The Megatrade Hall became the official venue of Ozine Fest from 2007 up to 2016
