= Re:member (Flow song) =

Single by FLOW
- Released: May 31, 2006
- Genre: Rock
- Label: Ki/oon Records
- Songwriter(s): Kōshi Asakawa, Takeshi Asakawa

FLOW singles chronology
| "Garden ~Summer Edit~" (2005) | "Re:member" (2006) | "Around The World / Kandata" (2006) |

Re:member is FLOW's ninth single. Its A-Side was used as the eighth opening theme song for the anime series Naruto. It reached #12 on the Oricon charts in its first week and charted for 8 weeks. The single received a Gold certification in January 2014 from the Recording Industry Association of Japan, for reaching 100,000 music downloads.

== Track listing ==
Track listing adapted from Sony Music Entertainment Japan.

| No. | Title | Length |
|---|---|---|
| 1. | "Re:member" | 3:19 |
| 2. | "Your song" | 3:24 |
| 3. | "Kaleidoscope" (カレイドスコープ) | 3:40 |
| 4. | "Re:member -Vocalless Mix-" | 3:22 |
| 5. | "Re:member -NARUTO Opening Mix-" | 1:34 |
