= Word of the Voice =

"WORD OF THE VOICE"

Single by FLOW
- Released: June 4, 2008
- Genre: Rock
- Label: Ki/oon Records
- Songwriter(s): Kōshi Asakawa, Takeshi Asakawa

FLOW singles chronology
"Arigatou" (2008)	"WORD OF THE VOICE" (2008)	"WORLD END" (2008)

WORD OF THE VOICE is FLOW's fifteenth single. Its A-Side was used as the second opening theme song for Persona -trinity soul-. It reached #15 on the Oricon charts in its first week and charted for 6 weeks. *

== Track listing ==
No.	Title	Length
1.	"WORD OF THE VOICE"	3:48
2.	"ESCA"	3:18
3.	"Always"	4:05
4.	"WORD OF THE VOICE -Instrumental-"	3:47
5.	"WORD OF THE VOICE -PERSONA Opening Mix-"	1:34
