= World End =

"WORLD END"

Single by FLOW
- Released: August 13, 2008
- Genre: Rock
- Label: Ki/oon Records
- Songwriter(s): Kōshi Asakawa

FLOW singles chronology
"WORD OF THE VOICE" (2008)	"WORLD END" (2008)	"Snow Flake (Kioku no Koshitsu) / Pulse" (2008)

WORLD END is FLOW's sixteenth single. Its A-Side was used as the second opening theme song for Code Geass: Lelouch of the Rebellion R2. It reached number 4 on the Oricon charts in its first week and charted for 10 weeks. *

== Track listing ==
No.	Title	Length
1.	"WORLD END"	3:46
2.	"LEATHER FACE"	3:10
3.	"I WILL"	3:56
4.	"WORLD END -Instrumental-"	3:48
5.	"WORLD END -CODE GEASS Opening Mix-"	1:29
