= Fuyu no Amaoto / Night Parade =

Single by FLOW
- Released: November 28, 2007
- Genre: Rock
- Label: Ki/oon

FLOW singles chronology
"Answer" (2007)	"Fuyu no Amaoto / Night Parade" (2007)	"Arigatou" (2008)

"Fuyu no Amaoto / Night Parade" is FLOW's thirteenth single. "Night Parade" is a collaboration between FLOW and Home Made Kazoku. The single has two editions: regular and limited. The limited edition includes a bonus DVD. It reached #19 on the Oricon charts in its first week and charted for 4 weeks. *

== Track listing ==
No.	Title	Length
1.	"Fuyu no Amaoto (冬の雨音)"	4:36
2.	"Night Parade"	4:58
3.	"Image"	3:44
4.	"Fuyu no Amaoto -Instrumental-"	4:36
5.	"Night Parade -Instrumental-"	4:56

== Bonus DVD Track listing ==
No.	Title	Length
1.	"Answer (PV)"
2.	"Making of Answer"
