= Colors (Flow song) =

2006 single by Flow

Single by Flow

from the album Isle
- Language: Japanese
- B-side: "Astro Slider" "Love Dub"
- Released: November 8, 2006
- Genre: J-pop; pop rock; anime song
- Length: 3:41
- Label: Ki/oon Music
- Songwriters: Kōshi Asakawa; Keigo Hayashi

Flow singles chronology
"Around The World / Kandata" (2006)	"Colors" (2006)	"Answer" (2007)

Music video
- "Colors" on YouTube

"Colors" (stylized in all caps) is a song by Japanese rock band Flow. Released as a single on November 8, 2006, it served as the first opening theme for the first season of the Japanese anime series Code Geass. It was later included on their fourth studio album Isle.

== Background and release ==
According to Flow bassist Got's (Kōtaro Gotō), the song's working title was "Lelouch" during the early stages of recording, named after the series protagonist, Lelouch Lamperouge.

Due to Code Geass being an anime-original series, the band was only given brief summaries of the plot and characters as references for writing the song.

The single was released on November 8, 2006 in two versions: a standard edition and a first-press limited edition. The limited edition included a window film jacket of the band, a 24-page collection of original artwork and setting materials of the opening, a Code Geass illustration jacket sticker drawn by series character designer Takahiro Kimura, a Lelouch Lamperouge Ashford Academy student ID, an Ashford Academy emblem sticker, an Enhanced CD that contained a live bootleg of "Colors" recorded in Dallas, and a TV commercial collection of the series.

== Composition and lyrics ==
"Colors" is a pop rock song, composed in the key of C-sharp major and is set in time signature of common time with a tempo of 136 BPM. Described as a "tearful disco", the song is inspired by progressive rock, with lyrics that express themes of a "trigger" and "conflict" to take initiative achieving world-changing dreams.

== Track listing ==
No.	Title	Lyrics	Music	Arrangement	Length
1.	"Colors"	Kōshi Asakawa; Keigo Hayashi	Takeshi Asakawa	Flow; Koichi Tsutaya	3:41
2.	"Astro Slider" (アストロスライダー)	K. Asakawa	T. Asakawa	Flow	3:38
3.	"Love Dub"	T. Asakawa	T. Asakawa	Flow	4:41
4.	"Colors" (Vocalless mix)				3:40
5.	"Colors" (Code Geass opening mix)				1:34
Total length:					17:14

== Covers ==
A cover by Haruna Kamijo (Mitsuna Nagashima) and Hina Araki (Rui Tanabe) was added to the game The Idolmaster Cinderella Girls: Starlight Stage on October 18, 2019. It was included in the single "The Idolmaster Cinderella Girls Starlight Master 35 Palette", released on January 8, 2020.

A cover by fictional rock band Afterglow (Ran Mitake (Ayane Sakura)) was added as a playable song in the smartphone rhythm game BanG Dream! Girls Band Party! on December 11, 2021, with Flow as a guest performer.

A cover by Kanaha Motosu (Hikaru Akao) and Mito Shiromaru (Reina Kondō) was added to the game World Dai Star: Yume no Stellarium on June 10, 2024.

Japanese voice actor Kōhei Amasaki covered the song for the 2024 voice actor cover album [Re:collection] Hit Song Cover Series feat. Voice Actors 2 〜00's-10's Edition〜.

== Charts ==
=== Weekly charts ===
Weekly chart performance for "Colors"
Chart (2006)	Peak position
Japan (Oricon)	2

== Certifications and sales ==
Certifications and sales for "Colors"
Region	Certification	Certified units/sales
Japan (RIAJ) Digital	Platinum	250,000^{*}
^{*} Sales figures based on certification alone.
