= Ryūsei / Sharirara =

Single by FLOW
- Released: February 18, 2004
- Genre: Rock
- Label: Ki/oon Records
- Songwriter(s): Kōshi Asakawa, Keigo Hayashi (both tracks)

FLOW singles chronology
"Dream Express" (2003)	"Ryūsei / Sharirara" (2004)	"GO!!!" (2004)

Ryuusei / Sharirara is FLOW's third single. It is a double A-side single. It reached #12 on the Oricon charts in its first week and charted for 10 weeks. *

FLOW's photo shoot promoting Ryūsei / Sharirara

== Track listing ==
No.	Title	Writer(s)	Length
1.	"Ryuusei (流星)"	Kōshi Asakawa, Keigo Hayashi	4:17
2.	"Sharirara(シャリララ)"	Kōshi Asakawa, Keigo Hayashi	3:09
3.	"3 Byou Mae (３秒前)"		3:37
4.	"Ryuusei ~Suisou Gakudan Version~ (~吹奏楽団バージョン~)"		2:10

== Cover version ==
4 of Argonavis project casts, Masahiro Itō, Jin Ogasawara, Daisuke Hyūga, and Kōsuke Miyauchi were covered "Ryūsei" on 5th leg of Argonavis Acoustic Tour 2021 -Autumn Session- held in Sendai Rensa on October 23, 2021.
