= Around the World / Kandata =

"Around The World / Kandata"

Single by FLOW
- Released: September 13, 2006
- Genre: Rock
- Label: Ki/oon Records
- Songwriters: Kandata: Takeshi Asakawa, Hiroshi Iwasaki; Around the World: Kōshi Asakawa, Takeshi Asakawa, Yasutarō Gotō

FLOW singles chronology
"Re:member" (2006)	"Around The World / Kandata" (2006)	"Colors" (2006)

"Around The World / Kandata" is Flow's tenth single. "Around The World" was used as the advertising theme song for the Suzuki Swift. It reached #23 on the Oricon charts in its first week and charted for five weeks.

== Track listing ==
No.	Title	Length
1.	"Around the World"	4:25
2.	"Kandata"	3:38
3.	"Shakys"	4:04
4.	"Around the World - Vocalless Mix"	4:25
5.	"Kandata - Vocalless Mix"	3:36
