= Golden Coast (album) =

Studio album by Flow
- Released: July 20, 2005
- Genre: Rock
- Label: Ki/oon Records

Flow chronology
Game (2004)	Golden Coast (2005)	Isle (2008)

Golden Coast is Flow's third studio album. It reached #9 on the Oricon charts and charted for 8 weeks.

== Release ==
The song "Life is beautiful" was released as the first single to promote Golden Coast. It reached #28 on the Oricon charts in its first week and charted for 4 weeks.

The next singles, "Rookie / Stay Gold", were released as a double A-Side single. "Stay Gold" was used as the theme song for the Korean film Make It Big. It reached #32 on the Oricon charts in its first week and charted for 5 weeks.

The third single, "DAYS", was used as the first opening theme song for Eureka Seven. It reached number 3 on the Oricon charts in its first week and charted for 14 weeks.

The final single, "Garden ~Summer Edit~", was released as a recut single from the original B-Side in their album Golden Coast. It reached #50 on the Oricon charts in its first week and charted for 2 weeks. *

== Track listing ==
No.	Title	Length
1.	"Dear"	3:09
2.	"Rookie"	3:23
3.	"Monster"	3:11
4.	"Days (Album Version)"	4:21
5.	"Garden"	4:03
6.	"Party Crazy"	3:32
7.	"No Limit"	3:12
8.	"Change Up!!!"	3:24
9.	"Yuuhi no Sakamichi (夕日の坂道)"	4:36
10.	"Stay Gold"	3:24
11.	"Blue Bird"	2:58
12.	"Funk-a-style"	3:00
13.	"Realize"	3:33
14.	"Life is Beautiful"	4:24
