= Kioon Music =

Japanese record label

- Parent company: Sony Music Entertainment Japan (1992–2014); Sony Music Labels Inc. (2014–present)
- Founded: April 1992; 34 years ago (as Kioon Sony Records); 1998; 28 years ago (as Kioon Records); 2012; 14 years ago (as Kioon Music)
- Founder: Shigeo Maruyama
- Status: Active
- Distributors: Epic/Sony Records (Japan); Sony Music Entertainment (outside Japan); Sony Music Solutions
- Genre: J-pop; J-rock
- Country of origin: Japan
- Official website: www.kioon.com

Kioon Music (キューンミュージック, Kyūn Myūjikku; stylized as Ki/oon Music) is a Japanese record label owned by Sony Music Labels Inc., a subsidiary of Sony Music Entertainment Japan.

Founded in 1992 as Kioon Sony Records, the label was renamed to Kioon Records in 1998. In 2001, Kioon Records Inc. was founded as a subsidiary of Sony Japan. In 2012, the company was rebranded as Kioon Music. In 2014, Sony Music Records Inc. absorbed Kioon Music alongside other Sony Japan subsidiaries, changing its name to Sony Music Labels. Since the absorption, Kioon Music has operated as an imprint of Sony Music Labels.

== Artists ==
- L'Arc-en-Ciel
- Asian Kung-Fu Generation
- Kocchi no Kento
- Polysics
- The Gospellers
- Denki Groove
- KANA-BOON
- Guitar Wolf
- Sid
- Group Tamashii
- Unicorn
- Lenny Code Fiction
- Kairi Yagi
- Tani Yuuki
- otoha
- Neguse
- Hitsujibungaku
- Regal Lily
- FZMZ
- Cody Lee
- CVLTE
- Awich
- Reol
- Yutori

== Former artists ==
- FLOW
- Home Made Kazoku
- BLUE ENCOUNT
- Puffy AmiYumi
- Supercar
- Pushim
- Chatmonchy
- Tomoe Shinohara
- The Babystars
- DOES
- Nico Touches the Walls
- plingmin
- Joe Inoue
- Merengue
- Acid Android
- Miki Furukawa
- Piko
- Domino
- Prague
- Lama
- Totalfat
- Hemenway
- Negoto
- Chara
- Folks
- Scenarioart
- PELICAN FANCLUB

== Labels ==
- And Music
- FCLS
- Loopa

=== Former ===
- Haunted Records
- Ki/oon Overseas
- Neosite Discs

== Vocaloid ==
In December 2010, Ki/oon Records released their own Vocaloid product Utatane Piko.

== See also ==
- List of record labels
- I Say Yeah!, the 10th anniversary single from Neosite Discs.
