= Ken Hirai discography =

Discography of Ken Hirai

- Studio albums: 10
- Compilation albums: 2
- Tribute albums: 3
- Singles: 40
- Video albums: 13
- Remix album: 1

The discography of Japanese R&B and pop singer Ken Hirai consists of ten studio albums, two compilation albums, one remix album, three cover albums, thirteen video albums and numerous singles and promotional singles. Hirai debuted as a musician under Sony Music Records in 1995 with the single "Precious Junk", but found success five years later with the single "Lakuen" and his third album, The Changing Same.

Hirai's success continued through the 2000s, with the single "Ōki na Furudokei" (2002), a Japanese-language version of "My Grandfather's Clock", an 1876 song by American composer Henry Clay Work, "Hitomi o Tojite" (2004), the theme song for the film Crying Out Love, In the Center of the World and "Pop Star" (2005), the theme song of the Misaki Ito-starring drama Kiken na Aneki.

In addition to his studio albums, Hirai has released a series of acoustic cover albums entitled Ken's Bar, named after a series of concept live concerts he performs.

== Studio albums ==
All release dates pertain to their release in Japan, unless stated.

List of albums, with selected chart positions
Title	Album details	Peak positions				Sales (JPN) (Note: Sales provided by Oricon database and are rounded to the nearest thousand copies.)	Certifications
Title	Album details	JPN	KOR Overseas (Note: The Gaon Albums Chart was established in 2010.) (Note: Week references for Gaon: Japanese Singer, Ura Utabaka, Ken's Bar III.)	TWN (Note: The G-Music chart was established in July 2005 and only archives the top 20 releases.)	TWN East Asian (Note: The G-Music East Asian chart is a sub-chart, so releases listed may not have charted on the main top 20.) (Note: Position was taken from 2005 week 30 for Sentimentalovers, 2008 week 11 for Fakin' Pop, 2011 week 24 for Japanese Singer.)	Sales (JPN)	Certifications
Un-balanced	Released: July 7, 1995; Label: Sony Music Records; Formats: CD, cassette, digital download	57	—	—	—	18,000	
Stare At	Released: December 1, 1996; Label: Sony; Formats: CD, cassette, digital download	—	—	—	—		
The Changing Same	Released: June 21, 2000; Label: Sony, DefStar Records; Formats: CD, cassette, digital download	1	—	—	—	1,265,000	RIAJ: Million
Gaining Through Losing	Released: July 4, 2001; Label: DefStar; Formats: CD, cassette, digital download	1	—	—	—	1,081,000	RIAJ: Million (Note: Gaining Through Losing received a 3× Platinum certification for 1,200,000 copies, however the 3× Platinum threshold was redefined as 750,000 copies in 2003.)
Life Is...	Released: January 22, 2003; Label: DefStar; Formats: CD, cassette, digital download	1	—	—	—	806,000	RIAJ: Million
Sentimentalovers	Released: November 24, 2004; Label: DefStar; Formats: CD, cassette, digital download	1	—	—	1	1,661,000	RIAJ: Million
Fakin' Pop	Released: March 12, 2008; Label: DefStar; Formats: CD, digital download	2	—	6	2	332,000	RIAJ: 2× Platinum
Japanese Singer	Released: June 8, 2011; Label: DefStar; Formats: CD, CD/DVD, digital download	3	10	—	12	141,000	RIAJ: Gold
The Still Life	Released: July 6, 2016; Label: Ariola Japan; Formats: CD, CD/DVD, digital download	4	—	—	—	72,000	
Anata ni Naritakatta (あなたになりたかった; I Wish I Were You)	Released: May 12, 2021; Label: Ariola Japan; Formats: CD, CD/DVD, CD/Blu-ray, digital download	2	—	—	—	25,521 (physical)	
"—" denotes items which were released before the creation of the G-Music or Gaon Charts, or items that did not chart.

== Compilation albums ==
List of albums, with selected chart positions
Title	Album details	Peak positions				Sales (JPN)	Certifications
Title	Album details	JPN	KOR Overseas	TWN	TWN East Asian (Note: Position was taken from 2005 week 46 for Utabaka, 2010 week 46 for Ura Utabaka.)	Sales (JPN)	Certifications
Ken Hirai 10th Anniversary Complete Single Collection '95-'05 Utabaka (歌バカ; "Song Fool")	Released: November 23, 2005; Label: DefStar; Formats: 2CD, Blu-spec CD, digital download	1	—	3	1	2,107,000	RIAJ: 2× Million
Ken Hirai 15th Anniversary c/w Collection '95-'10 "Ura Utabaka" (裏 歌バカ; "Reverse Song Fool")	Released: November 10, 2010; Label: DefStar; Formats: 2CD, 3CD, digital download	5	51	—	15	44,000	
Ken Hirai Singles Best Collection Utabaka 2" (歌バカ 2; "Song Fool 2")	Released: November 10, 2010; Label: DefStar; Formats: 3CD, 4CD, 3CD+DVD, digital download	2	—	—	—	77,000	
"—" denotes items which were released before the creation of the G-Music or Gaon Charts, or items that did not chart.

== Remix album ==
List of remix albums, with selected chart positions
Title	Album details	Peak positions	Sales (JPN)	Certifications
Title	Album details	JPN	Sales (JPN)	Certifications
KH Re-mixed Up 1	Released: November 28, 2001; Label: DefStar; Formats: 2CD, cassette	6	186,000	RIAJ: Gold

== Cover albums ==
List of cover albums, with selected chart positions
Title	Album details	Peak positions				Sales (JPN)	Certifications
Title	Album details	JPN	KOR	KOR Overseas	TWN East Asian (Note: Position was taken from 2009 week 25 for Ken's Bar II, 2014 week 45 for Ken's Bar III.)	Sales (JPN)	Certifications
Ken's Bar	Released: December 10, 2003; Label: DefStar; Formats: CD, Blu-spec CD, digital download	2	—	—	—	492,000	RIAJ: 2× Platinum
Ken's Bar II	Released: May 27, 2009; Label: DefStar; Formats: CD, CD/DVD, digital download	2	—	—	6	122,000	RIAJ: Gold
Ken's Bar III	Released: May 28, 2014; Label: Ariola Japan; Formats: CD, 2CD, CD/DVD, digital download	4	22	68	6	58,000	
"—" denotes items which were released before the creation of the G-Music or Gaon Charts.

== Singles ==
List of singles, with selected chart positions
Title	Year	Peak chart positions				Sales (JPN)	Certifications	Album
Title	Year	Oricon Singles Charts	Billboard Japan Hot 100 (Note: The Japan Hot 100 was established in February 2008.) (Note: Sources for chart positions are as follows: "Canvas", "Kimi wa Suteki", "Itsuka Hanareru Hi ga Kite mo", "Candy", "Boku wa Kimi ni Koi o Suru", "Sing Forever", "Aishiteiru", "Itoshiki Hibi yo", "Kokuhaku", "Kikyō ga Oka", "Grotesque", "Soredemo Shitai", "Kimi no Kodō wa Kimi ni Shika Narasenai", "Plus One", "Time".)	TWN	TWN East Asian (Note: Position was taken from 2009 week 43 for "Boku wa Kimi ni Koi o Suru", 2014 week 15 for "Grotesque", "Soredemo Shitai/Onnaji Samishisa".)	Sales (JPN)	Certifications	Album
"Precious Junk"	1995	50	—	—	—	44,000		Un-balanced
"Katahō Zutsu no Earphone" (片方ずつのイヤフォン; "One Side of an Earphone Each")	1995	—	—	—	—			Un-balanced
"Yokogao" (横顔; "Face in Profile")	1995	—	—	—	—			Stare At
"Doshaburi" (ドシャブリ; "Downpour")	1996	—	—	—	—			Stare At
"Stay with Me"	1996	—	—	—	—			Stare At
"Heat Up"	1997	—	—	—	—			Non-album single
"Love Love Love"	1998	—	—	—	—			The Changing Same
"Lakuen"	2000	7	—	—	—	549,000	RIAJ: (physical): Platinum; RIAJ (download): Gold	The Changing Same
"Why"	2000	8	—	—	—	211,000	RIAJ (physical): Gold	The Changing Same
"Love or Lust"	2000	6	—	—	—	264,000	RIAJ (physical): Gold	Gaining Through Losing
"Even If"	2000	3	—	—	—	333,000	RIAJ (physical): Gold; RIAJ (download): Gold	Gaining Through Losing
"Miracles"	2001	4	—	—	—	240,000	RIAJ (physical): Gold	Gaining Through Losing
"Kiss of Life"	2001	2	—	—	—	555,000	RIAJ (physical): Platinum	Gaining Through Losing
"Missin' You (It Will Break My Heart)"	2002	4	—	—	—	115,000	RIAJ (physical): Gold	Life Is...
"Strawberry Sex"	2002	13	—	—	—	49,000		Life Is...
"Ōki na Furudokei" (大きな古時計; "The Large Old Clock")	2002	1	—	—	—	772,000	RIAJ (physical): 2× Platinum	Life Is...
"Ring"	2002	1	—	—	—	322,000	RIAJ (physical): Platinum	Life Is...
"Life Is..."	2003	3	—	—	—	191,000	RIAJ (physical): Platinum	Life Is...
"Style"	2003	12	—	—	—	44,000	RIAJ (physical): Gold	Sentimentalovers
"Hitomi o Tojite" (瞳をとじて; "Close Your Eyes")	2004	2	—	—	—	893,000	RIAJ (ringtone): Million; RIAJ (physical): 3× Platinum; RIAJ (cellphone): Platinum; RIAJ (PC): 2× Platinum; RIAJ (streaming): Gold	Sentimentalovers
"Kimi wa Tomodachi" (キミはともだち; "You're My Friend")	2004	5	—	—	—	161,000	RIAJ (physical): Gold	Sentimentalovers
"Omoi ga Kasanaru Sono Mae ni..." (思いがかさなるその前に…; "Before the Thoughts Pile Up...")	2004	1	—	—	—	272,000	RIAJ (ringtone): 2× Platinum; RIAJ (physical): Platinum; RIAJ (download): Gold	Sentimentalovers
"Pop Star"	2005	1	91 (Note: Charted in 2008.)	—	—	244,000	RIAJ (ringtone): Million; RIAJ (cellphone): 2× Platinum; RIAJ (physical): Platinum; RIAJ (streaming): Platinum	Utabaka / Fakin' Pop
"Bye My Melody" (バイマイメロディー, Baimaimerodī)	2006	2	—	—	—	81,000	RIAJ (physical): Gold	Fakin' Pop
"Elegy" (哀歌(エレジー), Erejī)	2007	5	—	—	—	119,000	RIAJ (cellphone): Platinum; RIAJ (physical): Gold	Fakin' Pop
"Kimi no Suki na Toko" (君の好きなとこ; "Your Favorite Places")	2007	5	—	—	—	103,000	RIAJ (cellphone): Platinum; RIAJ (physical): Gold; RIAJ (streaming): Gold	Fakin' Pop
"Fake Star"	2007	6	—	—	—	32,000	RIAJ (download): Gold	Fakin' Pop
"Canvas" (キャンバス, Kyanbasu)	2008	6	5	—	—	40,000	RIAJ (cellphone): Gold	Fakin' Pop
"Kimi wa Suteki" (君はス・テ・キ♥; "You're Lovely")	2008	6	80	—	—	40,000		Fakin' Pop
"Itsuka Hanareru Hi ga Kite mo"	2008	19	17	—	—	19,000	RIAJ (cellphone): Gold	Fakin' Pop
"Candy"	2009	7	2	—	—	14,000		Japanese Singer
"Boku wa Kimi ni Koi o Suru"	2009	3	1	—	16	70,000	RIAJ (cellphone): 2× Platinum	Japanese Singer
"Sing Forever"	2010	7	5	—	—	16,000		Japanese Singer
"Aishiteru"	2010	9	12	—	—	34,000	RIAJ (cellphone): Gold	Japanese Singer
"Itoshiki Hibi yo"	2011	7	6	—	—	31,000	RIAJ (download): Platinum	Japanese Singer
"Kokuhaku" (告白; "Love Confession")	2012	5	6	—	—	44,000	RIAJ (download): Gold	The Still Life
"Kikyō ga Oka" (桔梗が丘; "Bellflower Hill")	2013	—	16	—	—			The Still Life
"Grotesque" (グロテスク, Gurotesuku) (featuring Namie Amuro)	2014	4	4	17	3	51,000	RIAJ (download): Platinum	The Still Life
"Onnaji Samishisa" (おんなじさみしさ; "The Same Sadness")	2014	13	— (Note: Charted at number 65 on the Adult Alternative Airplay chart.)	—N/a	12	13,000		The Still Life
"Soredemo Shitai" (ソレデモシタイ; "Still Want to")	2014	13	10	—N/a	12	13,000		The Still Life
"Kimi no Kodō wa Kimi ni Shika Narasenai" (君の鼓動は君にしか鳴らせない; "Your Heartbeat Can Only Beat for You")	2015	18	18	—N/a	—	11,000		The Still Life
"Plus One"	2016	15	20	—N/a	—	10,000		The Still Life
"Time"	2016	15	54	—N/a	—	10,000		The Still Life
"Mahotte Itte Ii Kana?" (魔法って言っていいかな?; "Speaking of Magic, Isn't it Nice?")	2016	15	4	—	—	12,000	RIAJ (download): Platinum	The Still Life
"Boku no Kokoro wo Tsukutteyo" (僕の心をつくってよ; "Make My Mind")	2017	7	7	—	—	17,000		Ken Hirai Singles Best Collection Utabaka 2
"Nonfiction"	2017	10	5	—	—	18,000	RIAJ (download): Platinum; RIAJ (streaming): Gold	Ken Hirai Singles Best Collection Utabaka 2
"Todokanaikara" (トドカナイカラ)	2018	18	13	—	—	7,000		Anata ni Naritakatta
"Shiranaindesho?" (知らないんでしょ？, "You Don't Know, Right?")	2018	16	35	—	—	7,000		Anata ni Naritakatta
"Half of Me"	2018	15	17	—	—	13,000	RIAJ (download): Gold	Anata ni Naritakatta
"Itemotattemo" (いてもたっても, "Can't Stand Still")	2019	—	39	—	—			Anata ni Naritakatta
"#302"	2019	11	18	—	—	9,000		Anata ni Naritakatta
"Kaibutsusan" (怪物さん, "Mr. Monster") (featuring Aimyon)	2020	—	15	—	—		RIAJ (streaming): Silver	Anata ni Naritakatta

=== Promotional singles ===
Title	Year	Peak chart positions	Album
Title	Year	Billboard Japan Hot 100 (Note: Sources for chart positions are as follows: "Shashin", "Stardust", "Because of You", "Love (Destiny)", "Heart of Mine", "Wakareuta".)	Album
"K.O.L."	2000	—	The Changing Same
"Gaining Through Losing"	2001	—	Gaining Through Losing
"One Love Wonderful World"	2001	—	KH Re-mixed Up 1
"Come Back"	2003	—	Life Is...
"Sekai de Ichiban Kimi ga Suki?" (世界で一番君が好き？; "Do I Like You Most in the World?")	2003	—	Life Is...
"The Rose"	2003	—	Ken's Bar
"Lovin' You"	2003	—	Ken's Bar
"Miagete Goran Yoru no Hoshi o"	2003	—	Ken's Bar
"You've Got a Friend"	2003	—	Ken's Bar
"Faith"	2003	—	Ken's Bar
"When You Wish upon a Star"	2003	—	Ken's Bar
"ABC"	2003	—	Ken's Bar
"Sentimental" (センチメンタル, Senchimentaru)	2004	—	Sentimentalovers
"Utsukushii Hito" (美しい人; "Beautiful Person")	2007	—	Fakin' Pop
"Shashin" (写真; "Photograph")	2008	49	Fakin' Pop
"Stardust" (with Hibari Misora)	2009	54	Ken's Bar II
"Because of You"	2009	69	Ken's Bar II
"Love (Destiny)"	2009	77	Ken's Bar II
"Heart of Mine"	2009	68	Ken's Bar II
"Wakareuta" (with Masamune Kusano)	2009	91	Ken's Bar II
"Yume no Mukō de" (夢のむこうで; "On the Other Side of a Dream")	2011	—	Japanese Singer
"Girls 3x"	2011	—	Japanese Singer
"Virtual Insanity"	2014	— (Note: Charted at number 17 on the Adult Alternative Airplay subchart, and at number 51 on the Hot Top Airplay chart.)	Ken's Bar III
"1995"	2021	—	Anata ni Naritakatta

== Video albums ==
=== Music video collections ===
List of media, with selected chart positions
Title	Album details	Peak positions
Title	Album details	JPN
Ken Hirai Films Vol. 1	Released: December 1, 1996; Label: Sony; Formats: VHS, DVD	—
Ken Hirai Films Vol. 2	Released: June 21, 2000; Label: Sony; Formats: DVD, VHS	—
Ken Hirai Films Vol. 3	Released: July 4, 2001; Label: DefStar; Formats: DVD	17
Ken Hirai Films Vol. 5	Released: January 22, 2003; Label: DefStar; Formats: DVD	14
Ken Hirai Films Vol. 7	Released: November 24, 2004; Label: DefStar Records; Formats: DVD	5
Ken Hirai Films Vol. 9	Released: April 23, 2008; Label: DefStar Records; Formats: DVD	49
Ken Hirai Films Vol. 12	Released: May 30, 2012; Label: DefStar; Formats: DVD	4
Ken Hirai Films Vol. 12	Released: May 12, 2021; Label: Ariola Japan; Formats: DVD, Blu-ray	TBA

=== Live concerts ===
List of media, with selected chart positions
Title	Album details	Peak positions
Title	Album details	JPN
Ken Hirai Films Vol. 4: Live Tour 2001 Gaining Through Losing at the Budokan	Released: January 30, 2002; Label: DefStar; Formats: DVD	3
Ken Hirai Films Vol. 6: MTV Unplugged Ken Hirai	Released: December 20, 2003; Label: DefStar; Formats: DVD	8
Ken Hirai Films Vol. 8: Ken Hirai 10th Anniversary Tour Final at Saitama Super Arena	Released: December 7, 2005; Label: DefStar; Formats: Blu-ray, DVD	9
Ken Hirai Films Vol. 10: Ken Hirai Live Tour 2008 Fakin' Pop	Released: December 17, 2008; Label: DefStar; Formats: Blu-ray, DVD	18
Ken Hirai Films Vol. 11: Ken's Bar 10th Anniversary	Released: June 10, 2009; Label: DefStar; Formats: DVD	6
Ken's Bar 10th Anniversary Christmas Eve Special!	Released: June 10, 2009; Label: DefStar; Formats: Blu-ray	6
Ken Hirai Films Vol. 13: Ken Hirai 20th Anniversary Opening Special at Zepp Tokyo	Released: March 23, 2016; Label: Ariola Japan; Formats: DVD, Blu-ray	19
Ken Hirai Films Vol.14 Ken’s Bar 20th Anniversary Special	Released: December 5, 2018; Label: Ariora Japan; Formats: DVD, Blu-ray	17

== Other appearances ==
List of non-studio album or guest appearances that feature Ken Hirai
Title	Year	Album
"Moonstruck" (Chaka with Ken Hirai)	1996	With Friends
"Holding On to Promises" (Gerry DeVeaux featuring Ken Hirai)	1996	Back to You
"Kimi ga Warattara" (君が笑ったら; "If You Laugh")	1998	Setsunai: Tokyo Heart Break Original Soundtrack
"Scent of Woman (Yume no Kaori)" (夢の香り; "Scent of Dreams") (K Dub Shine featuring Ken Hirai)	2000	Ikiru
"Eyes on You" (Akina Nakamori)	2002	Resonancia
"You Are the Sunshine of My Life"	2003	Conception: Stevie Wonder Tribute
"Got Me a Feeling" (Bonnie Pink featuring Ken Hirai)	2005	Reminiscence
"Tokyo Pierrot" (東京ピエロ; "Tokyo Clown") (Ohashi Trio featuring Ken Hirai)	2012	White
"Sayonara Restaurant" (さよならレストラン; "Goodbye Restaurant") (Toko Furuuchi featuring Ken Hirai)	2013	And Then...: 20th Anniversary Best
