= MTV Video Music Award Japan for Best Male Video =

Annual Japanese music award

Best Male Video (最優秀男性アーティストビデオ賞)

== Results ==
The following table displays the nominees and the winners in bold print with a yellow background.

=== 2000s ===
Year	Artist	Video
**2002** (1st)	**Ken Hirai**	
**2002** (1st)	Cornelius	
**2002** (1st)	Eminem	
**2002** (1st)	Fatboy Slim	
**2002** (1st)	Jamiroquai	
**2003** (2nd)	**Craig David**	**"What's Your Flava?"**
**2003** (2nd)	Eminem	"Without Me"
**2003** (2nd)	Ken Hirai	"Ring"
**2003** (2nd)	Tamio Okuda	"Man wo Jishite" (ヘヘヘイ)
**2003** (2nd)	Justin Timberlake	"Like I Love You"
**2004** (3rd)	**Pharrell featuring Jay-Z**	**"Frontin'"**
**2004** (3rd)	Ken Hirai	"Style"
**2004** (3rd)	Sean Paul	"Get Busy"
**2004** (3rd)	Justin Timberlake	"Rock Your Body"
**2004** (3rd)	Zeebra	"Touch The Sky"
**2005** (4th)	**Ken Hirai**	**"Hitomi wo Tojite" (瞳をとじて)**
**2005** (4th)	Kreva	"Hitori Janai No Yo" (ひとりじゃないのよ)
**2005** (4th)	Tamio Okuda	"Nanto Iu" (何と言う)
**2005** (4th)	Usher featuring Lil' Jon and Ludacris	"Yeah!"
**2005** (4th)	Kanye West	"Jesus Walks"
**2006** (5th)	**Ken Hirai**	**"Pop Star"**
**2006** (5th)	50 Cent featuring Olivia	"Candy Shop"
**2006** (5th)	Hyde	"Countdown"
**2006** (5th)	Jack Johnson	"Sitting, Waiting, Wishing"
**2006** (5th)	Kanye West	"Diamonds From Sierra Leone"
**2007** (6th)	**DJ Ozma**	**"Age Age Every Night" (アゲ♂アゲ♂EVERY☆騎士)**
**2007** (6th)	Ken Hirai	"Bye My Melody"
**2007** (6th)	Kreva	"The Show"
**2007** (6th)	Daniel Powter	"Bad Day"
**2007** (6th)	Justin Timberlake	"SexyBack"
**2008** (7th)	**Ne-Yo**	**"Because of You"**
**2008** (7th)	Chris Brown featuring T-Pain	"Kiss Kiss"
**2008** (7th)	Ken Hirai	"Fake Star"
**2008** (7th)	Tamio Okuda	"Mugen no Kaze" (無限の風)
**2008** (7th)	Seamo	"Cry Baby"
**2009** (8th)	**Kreva**	**"Akasatanahamayarawawon" (あかさたなはまやらわをん)**
**2009** (8th)	Motohiro Hata	"Forever Song" (フォーエバーソング)
**2009** (8th)	Ne-Yo	"Closer"
**2009** (8th)	Usher featuring Young Jeezy	"Love in This Club"
**2009** (8th)	Kanye West	"Heartless"

=== 2010s ===
Year	Artist	Video
**2010** (9th)	**Shota Shimizu**	**"Utsukushiki Hibi Yo" (美しき日々よ)**
**2010** (9th)	Jay'ed	"Everybody"
**2010** (9th)	Jay-Z featuring Alicia Keys	"Empire State of Mind"
**2010** (9th)	Kreva	"Speechless" (瞬間speechless)
**2010** (9th)	Sean Paul	"So Fine"
**2011** (10th)	**Bruno Mars**	**"Just the Way You Are"**
**2011** (10th)	Kanye West featuring Pusha T	"Runaway"
**2011** (10th)	Saito Kazuyoshi	"Zutto Suki Datta" (ずっと好きだった)
**2011** (10th)	Shota Shimizu	"You & I"
**2012** (11th)	**Bruno Mars**	**"It Will Rain"**
**2012** (11th)	David Guetta featuring Flo Rida and Nicki Minaj	"Where Them Girls At"
**2012** (11th)	Gen Hoshino	"Film" (フィルム)
**2012** (11th)	Justin Bieber	"Mistletoe"
**2012** (11th)	Naoto Inti Raymi	"Brave"
**2013** (12th)	**Exile Atsushi**	**"Melrose"**
**2013** (12th)	Bruno Mars	"Locked Out of Heaven"
**2013** (12th)	Gotye featuring Kimbra	"Somebody That I Used to Know"
**2013** (12th)	Justin Bieber featuring Nicki Minaj	"Beauty and a Beat"
**2013** (12th)	Daichi Miura	"Two Hearts"
**2014** (13th)	**Exile Atsushi**	**"Blue Dragon"**
**2014** (13th)	Justin Timberlake	"Take Back the Night"
**2014** (13th)	Miyavi	"Horizon"
**2014** (13th)	Naoto Inti Raymi	Naoto Inti Raymi
**2014** (13th)	Robin Thicke featuring T.I. and Pharrell Williams	"Blurred Lines"
**2015** (14th)	**Gen Hoshino**	**"Sun"**
**2016** (15th)	**Yu Takahashi**	**"Hikari no Hahen"**
**2016** (15th)	AK-69	"Flying B"
**2016** (15th)	Daichi Miura	"Cry & Fight"
**2016** (15th)	Motohiro Hata	"Sumire"
**2016** (15th)	Rekishi (feat. Morino Ishimatsu)	"Saigo no Shogun"
**2017** (16th)	**Gen Hoshino**	**"Family Song"**
**2018** (17th)	**Kenshi Yonezu**	**"Lemon"**
**2019** (18th)	**Daichi Miura**	**"Katasumi(片隅)"**

== See also ==
- MTV Video Music Award for Best Male Video
- MTV Europe Music Award for Best Male
