= Lakuen =

2000 single by Ken Hirai

Single by Ken Hirai

from the album The Changing Same
- Released: January 19, 2000
- Recorded: 1999
- Genre: contemporary R&B
- Length: 5:34
- Label: Sony Music Records
- Songwriters: Makoto Atozi, Masahito Nakano

Ken Hirai singles chronology
"Love Love Love" (1998)	"Lakuen" (2000)	"Why" (2000)

Music video
- "Lakuen" on YouTube

"Lakuen" (Japanese: 楽園, Hepburn: Rakuen; "Paradise"), stylised as "LAKuEN", is a song by Japanese singer Ken Hirai. It was released on January 19, 2000, as his eighth single, and became his biggest hit since his debut in 1995.

== Background and development ==
"Lakuen" was Hirai's first release in two years, since the single "Love Love Love" in 1998. Hirai's debut single "Precious Junk" in 1995 charted at number 50 on Oricon's singles charts, but since then he had not charted on Oricon's singles chart. The popularity of this song managed to revitalise Hirai's career.

== Promotion and release ==
The song became popular after intense radio play from FM stations across Japan. Hirai's follow-up album The Changing Same, released in June 2000, debuted at number one on Oricon's albums chart, and became certified for over one million copies sold.

Hirai performed the song three times on TV Asahi's Music Station: first on March 10, 2000, followed by on the 2000 New Year's special on December 29, and a week before the release of his sixth album Sentimentalovers on November 19, 2004. Hirai performed the song at the 51st Kōhaku Uta Gassen New Year's TV song contest on December 31, 2000.

== Critical reception and covers ==
CDJournal reviewers described the song as a "mellow soul number" that was "an emotionally moving good quality work". They noted Hirai's strong use of falsetto in the song not present in his previous works. They further praised the lyrics for the strong imagery of "pure love" that they create for the listener.

In 2007 on her extended play Sings: Winter, and Luv, Satomi' covered the song, and in 2010 Nami Tamaki covered the song on her single "Omoide ni Naru no?" (2010). In 2012, bilingual singer Beni covered the song in English for her album Covers 2. She wrote the new English lyrics in collaboration with lyricist Seiji Motoyama.

== Track listing ==
No.	Title	Lyrics	Music	Arranger	Length
1.	"Lakuen"	Makoto Atozi	Masahito Nakano	Nakano	5:35
2.	"Affair"	Gorō Matsui	243	Uru	5:18
3.	"What's Goin' On?"	Ken Hirai, Anna	Hirai	Ken Matsubara	4:14
4.	"Lakuen (Birthday Mix)"	Atozi	Nakano	DJ Koutarou.A	6:45
Total length:					21:52

== Chart rankings ==
Chart (2000)	Peak position
Japan Oricon weekly singles	7

=== Sales and certifications ===
Chart	Amount
Oricon physical sales	549,000
RIAJ physical certification	Platinum (400,000+)
RIAJ digital certification	Gold (100,000+)

== Release history ==
Region	Date	Format	Distributing Label	Catalogue codes
Japan	January 19, 2000	CD single	Sony Music Records	SRCL-4720
Taiwan	May 29, 2000	CD single	Linfair Records Ltd.	SRCL4720A
Japan	October 1, 2000	CD single	Defstar Records	DFCZ-1014
Japan	October 23, 2013	Digital download	Defstar Records	
