= 666 =

666 may refer to:

- 666 (number)
- 666 BC, a year
- AD 666, a year
- 666 AM, an AM radio frequency
- The number of the beast, a reference in the Book of Revelation in the New Testament

== Places ==
- 666 Desdemona, a minor planet in the asteroid belt
- List of highways numbered 666
  - U.S. Route 666, an American highway now numbered U.S. Route 491
  - Pennsylvania Route 666, a state route in Northwestern Pennsylvania
- 666 Fifth Avenue, now 660th Fifth Avenue

== Entertainment ==
- 666, a pornographic movie series by John Thompson Productions
- Wrestling of Darkness 666, a Japanese professional wrestling promotion
- 666 ABC Canberra, an ABC Local Radio station based in Canberra
- username:666, a 2008 Japanese qrostue animation
- 666 Park Avenue, an American supernatural drama series

=== Music ===
- 666 (band), a German trance music group

==== Albums ====
- SixSixSix, a four-LP box set by Sleep Chamber
- 666 (Aphrodite's Child album)
- 6:66 Satan's Child, a 1999 album by Danzig
- 666 (Hyde album), an album by the musician Hyde
- 666 (Billy Talent album), a live album by Billy Talent
- 6:6:6, a split CD between Smackin' Isaiah (a.k.a. A Wilhelm Scream), Moronique and Merrick

==== Songs ====
- 666, a song on the 1982 album Metal on Metal, by Anvil
- Six Six Six, a song on the 2014 album Hebrews, by Say Anything
- 666, a song on the 2022 album G.I.N.A, by Amerado

== See also ==
- 667 (disambiguation)
- A666 road in Greater Manchester and Lancashire, England
- Hexakosioihexekontahexaphobia, fear of the number 666
- Old 666, a noted Boeing B-17E Flying Fortress heavy bomber of World War II
- Three 6 Mafia, an American hip-hop/rap group
- Damián 666 (born 1961), Mexican professional wrestler
- Bestia 666 (born 1989), Mexican professional wrestler
