= Life Is =

Life Is may refer to

- Life Is..., a 2003 album by Ken Hirai
- Life Is...Too Short, the second studio album by Too Short 1988
