= Unbalanced =

Unbalanced may refer to:

- Lacking physiological balance
- Unbalanced line, where the impedance of the two conductor paths are not equal
- Unbalanced circuit, a circuit with unbalanced ports, usually with one terminal connected to common
- An unbalanced formation in American football
- Unbalanced chemical equations
- The opposite of balanced audio

== Music ==
- Un-balanced
- Unbalanced Load second album by comedian Doug Benson
- "Unbalanced", song by The 77s from EP (The 77s EP)
- "Unbalanced", song by Artery (band) 1980
