= Countdown (Hyde song) =

Single by Hyde

from the album Faith
- Released: October 5, 2005
- Genre: Alternative rock
- Length: 12:56
- Label: Ki/oon Records / Haunted Records
- Songwriter: Hyde

Hyde singles chronology
"Horizon" (2003)	"Countdown" (2005)	"Season's Call" (2006)

"Countdown" is the sixth single by Japanese singer Hyde, and the first single from his third solo album Faith.

It was released on 5 October 2005, and was Hyde's first solo single since 2003. This is the first single co-produced by Hyde and K.A.Z and charted at #1 on the Oricon ranking charts the week it was released.

The B-side to this single is "Evergreen (Dist.)", a rock version of Hyde's very first solo single that was also featured on his first solo album, Roentgen (released March 27, 2002). Countdown is also featured in Moero! Nekketsu Rhythm Damashii Osu! Tatakae! Ouendan 2, a Nintendo DS game.

== Track listing ==
1. "Countdown" (Hyde/Hyde) - 4:07
2. "Countdown <US>" (Hyde/Hyde) - 4:10
3. "Evergreen <Dist.>" (Hyde/Hyde) - 4:39
