= Itsuka Hanareru Hi ga Kite mo =

Single by Ken Hirai

from the album Fakin' Pop
- Released: April 23, 2008
- Recorded: 2007
- Genre: Pop
- Length: 13:07
- Label: Defstar Records
- Songwriter(s): Ken Hirai
- Producer(s): Ken Hirai

Ken Hirai singles chronology
"Canvas/Kimi wa Su-te-ki♥"" (2008)	"Itsuka Hanareru Hi ga Kite mo" (2008)	"Candy" (2009)

Music video
- "Itsuka Hanareru Hi ga Kite mo" on YouTube

"Itsuka Hanareru Hi ga Kite mo" (いつか離れる日が来ても, lit. "Even If the Day We Get Separated Comes") is Ken Hirai's twenty-ninth (second recut) single, released on April 23, 2008. The song was written for the movie "Ano Sora wo Oboeteru", starring Yutaka Takenouchi. The music video stars actress Rie Miyazawa.

== Track list ==
No.	Title	Lyrics	Music	Length
1.	"Itsuka Hanareru Hi ga Kite mo (いつか離れる日が来ても)"	Ken Hirai	Ken Hirai	6:30
2.	"Itsuka Hanareru Hi ga Kite mo (Less Vocal) (いつか離れる日が来ても (less vocal))"	Ken Hirai	Ken Hirai	6:32

== Charts ==
=== Oricon Sales Chart ===
Release	Chart	Peak Position	First Day/Week Sales	Sales Total	Chart Run
April 23, 2008	Oricon Daily Singles Chart	14			
April 23, 2008	Oricon Weekly Singles Chart	19	7,933	19,347	8 weeks
April 23, 2008	Oricon Monthly Singles Chart				
April 23, 2008	Oricon Yearly Singles Chart	367			

=== Billboard Japan Sales Chart ===
Release	Chart	Peak Position
April 23, 2008	Billboard Japan Hot 100	17
April 23, 2008	Billboard Japan Hot 100 Airplay	
April 23, 2008	Billboard Japan Hot Singles Sales	

=== Physical Sales Charts ===
Chart	Peak position
Oricon Daily Singles Chart	14
Oricon Weekly Singles Chart	19
Oricon Yearly Singles Chart	367
Soundscan Singles Chart (CD-Only)	19
