= Roentgen Stories =

2004 DVD collective by Hyde

Roentgen Stories is a DVD collective of four promotional videos (PVs) by popular Japanese rock vocalist Hyde. It was released November 3, 2004 by Ki/oon Records and Haunted Records. The record peaked at number 7 on Oricon DVD Chart.

== Contents ==
It features the PVs of the three singles and additional bonus music video. All songs are from his first solo album, Roentgen.

1. "Evergreen" (single released 2001.10.17)
2. "Angel's Tale" (single released 2001.12.12)
3. "Shallow Sleep" (single released 2002.02.27)
4. "Secret Letters"

The order the videos are arranged on the DVD are coincidentally the order in which they were released.

The four videos are intended to be viewed as a sequence, forming a continuous narrative that explores themes of life, death, and their intersection. Although the songs on Roentgen are largely ballads, the accompanying videos present a darker and more somber thematic tone.

=== Covers note ===
An interesting note is that the cover of the Evergreen single features one rose. Angel's Tale features two tulips. Continuing in this pattern, Shallow Sleep, the third single released should have three lilies but instead, the single's cover clearly depicts four lilies.

Two theories are possible:

1. Lilies are a classic symbol of death. The number 'four' (四; shi) is a Japanese homonym of death (死; shi.)
2. Roentgen Stories features not only the trilogy of singles, but also a music video for another Roentgen song, Secret Letters. Perhaps Secret Letters was the "lost" third single.

The first theory is more likely, though, due to the arrangement of the videos on the DVD and the progression of the story told through them.

== See also ==
- Roentgen (album)
