= Aishiteru (Ken Hirai song) =

Single by Ken Hirai

from the album Japanese Singer
- Released: November 10, 2010
- Recorded: 2010
- Genre: Pop, R&B
- Length: 23:13
- Label: Defstar Records
- Songwriters: Ken Hirai, Hy Zaret, Alex North
- Producer: Seiji Kameda

Ken Hirai singles chronology
"Sing Forever" (2010)	"Aishiteru" (2010)	"Itoshiki Hibi yo" (2011)

Music video
- "Aishiteru" on YouTube

"Aishiteru" (アイシテル; lit. "I Love You") is the thirty-third single by Japanese recording artist Ken Hirai. The song was written and composed by Hirai and production was handled by Seiji Kameda. It was released on November 10, 2010, as the fourth single from Hirai's eighth studio album Japanese Singer. "Aishiteru" serves as theme song for the film Ghost: In Your Arms Again, a Japanese remake of the 1990 American film Ghost. The single includes two B-sides: "Air Cameraman," written and composed by Hirai, and "Unchained Melody," a cover of the 1965 The Righteous Brothers song, which was featured in the original Ghost.

The single was issued in both standard and limited editions. The limited edition was released in Enhanced CD format and includes live footage from Hirai's Ken's Bar concert in New York and the music video of "Sing Forever."

The single debuted at number 10 on the Oricon Daily Singles Chart on November 9, 2010, and climbed to number 7 on November 11, 2010. It peaked at number 9 on the Oricon Weekly Singles Chart with 18,137 copies sold. The single ranked at number 24 on the Oricon Monthly Singles Chart for the month of November 2010 with 28,056 copies sold.

== Track listing ==
No.	Title	Lyrics	Music	Length
1.	"Aishiteru" (アイシテル I Love You)	Ken Hirai	Hirai	5:15
2.	"Air Cameraman"	Hirai	Hirai	4:06
3.	"Unchained Melody"	Hy Zaret	Alex North	3:59
4.	"Boku wa Kimi ni Koi wo Suru (Rei Harakami Remix)"	Hirai	Hirai	4:48
5.	"Aishiteru (Less Vocal)"		Hirai	4:48
Total length:				23:13

Limited edition CD-Extra
No.	Title	Length
1.	"Live Movie: Ken Hirai 15th Anniversary Special!! Vol. 3 Ken's Bar in N.Y."
2.	"Sing Forever (Music Video)"

== Charts and sales ==
Chart (2010)	Peak position	Sales
Billboard Japan Hot 100	12	33,063
Billboard Japan Hot Top Airplay	18	33,063
Billboard Japan Adult Contemporary Airplay	20	33,063
Billboard Japan Hot Singles Sales	10	33,063
Oricon Daily Singles	7	33,063
Oricon Weekly Singles	9	33,063
Oricon Monthly Singles	24	33,063
Oricon Yearly Singles	210	33,063
SoundScan Japan Weekly Singles	7	33,063
