= 667 (disambiguation) =

667 is a calendar year. 667 may also refer to:

- 667 BC
- 667 (number)
- 667 (Pier Gonella album), 2023
- 667 Denise, a minor planet
- 667.. The Neighbour of the Beast, a 2004 album by Wig Wam

== See also ==
- 666 (disambiguation)
- Area codes 410, 443, and 667
