= Dangerous Beauty (TV series) =

- Genre: Drama
- Written by: Shigeki Kaneko; Tamio Hayashi; Chiho Watanabe
- Directed by: Satoshi Kubota; Hiroaki Matsuyama
- Starring: Misaki Ito; Mirai Moriyama; Ken Utsui; Yumiko Shaku; Masanobu Takashima
- Opening theme: "See Ya" by Atomic Kitten
- Ending theme: "Pop Star" by Ken Hirai
- Country of origin: Japan
- Original language: Japanese
- No. of episodes: 10

Production
- Producer: Hiroyuki Gotō
- Running time: 54 minutes

Original release
- Network: Fuji Television
- Release: 17 October – 19 December 2005

Dangerous Beauty (危険なアネキ, Kiken na Aneki; also known as Dangerous Sister) is a Japanese television drama. It premiered in 2005 and was broadcast by Fuji Television, and ran for 10 episodes. It boasted the acclaimed actress Misaki Ito as one of the primary roles.

The ending theme is the song "Pop Star" by Ken Hirai.

== Summary ==
Minagawa Yutaro's life has always followed a straight and narrow path, while his sister, Minagawa Hiroko, has only her looks to get her by. However, Yutaro's begins to unravel after his sister moves in. What he doesn't realize is that while he was studying to pass the entrance examinations for a prestigious medical school, his father's sake business, the Minagawa Brewery, was slowly going bankrupt and was forced to take a ¥6,000,000 loan. How will Hiroko tackle this loan? What is the fate of the Minagawa Brewery? Will it all work out itself out, as things always have in Hiroko's favor, or will her dreams fail?

== Cast ==
- Misaki Ito as Hiroko Minagawa
- Mirai Moriyama as Yūtarō Minagawa
- Ken Utsui a Gentarō Minagawa
- Yumiko Shaku as Saori Kitamura
- Nana Eikura as Ai Tamura
- Yūta Hiraoka as Takumi Nakamura
- Masanobu Takashima as Ikuo Takeda

Preceded by Slow Dance; 4 July 2005 – 12 September 2005	Fuji TV Getsuku Drama; Mondays 21:00 – 21:54 (JST)	Succeeded by Saiyūki (9 January 2006 – 20 March 2006)
