= Itoshiki Hibi yo =

Single by Ken Hirai

from the album Japanese Singer
- A-side: "Itoshiki Hibi yo"
- B-side: "Run to You"
- Released: May 4, 2011
- Recorded: 2011
- Genre: Pop
- Length: 16:43
- Label: Defstar Records
- Songwriters: Ken Hirai, Kiyoshi Matsuo
- Producers: Ken Hirai, Reo

Ken Hirai singles chronology
"Aishiteru" (2010)	"Itoshiki Hibi yo" (2011)	"Kokuhaku" (2012)

Music video
- "Itoshiki Hibi yo" on YouTube

"Itoshiki Hibi yo" (いとしき日々よ; lit. "Oh Sweet Days") is the thirty-fourth single by Japanese recording artist Ken Hirai. The song was written by Hirai, composed by Kiyoshi Matsuo and production was handled by Hirai. It was released on May 4, 2011 as the fifth single from Hirai's eighth studio album Japanese Singer. "Itoshiki Hibi yo" serves as theme song for the second season of the TBS drama Jin. The B-side, "Run to You" is used in Nexco Central Japan commercials starring actress Aya Ueto.

The single debuted at number 9 on the Oricon Daily Singles Chart on May 3, 2011 and climbed to number 4 on May 9, 2011. It peaked at number 7 on the Oricon Weekly Singles Chart with 13,766 copies sold. The single ranked at number 24 on the Oricon Monthly Singles Chart for the month of May 2011 with 22,456 copies sold.

The song was certified platinum for digital downloads by the RIAJ.

"Itoshiki Hibi yo" was voted third most popular drama theme song of the spring season in a RecoChoku user poll.

== Track listing ==
No.	Title	Lyrics	Music	Length
1.	"Itoshiki Hibi yo" (いとしき日々よ Oh Sweet Days)	Ken Hirai	Kiyoshi Matsuo	6:03
2.	"Run to You"	Hirai	Hirai	4:39
3.	"Itoshiki Hibi yo (Less Vocal)"		Matsuo	6:00
Total length:				16:43

== Charts and sales ==
Chart (2011)	Peak position	Sales
Billboard Japan Hot 100	6	25,328
Billboard Japan Hot Top Airplay	4	25,328
Billboard Japan Adult Contemporary Airplay	3	25,328
Billboard Japan Hot Singles Sales	7	25,328
Oricon Daily Singles	4	25,328
Oricon Weekly Singles	7	25,328
Oricon Monthly Singles	24	25,328
SoundScan Japan Weekly Singles	3	25,328
