= Faith (Hyde album) =

Studio album by Hyde
- Released: April 26, 2006
- Recorded: 2005–2006
- Genre: Alternative rock; hard rock
- Length: 45:10
- Label: Haunted Records, Ki/oon Records, Tofu Records (NA)
- Producer: Hyde, K.A.Z, Steven Johnson, Shinya "Robot" Kishiro, Takao Saiki, George Tetsumoto

Hyde chronology
666 (2003)	Faith (2006)	Hyde (2009)

Faith is the third album by Hyde, released on April 26, 2006. The limited edition included a DVD with the music video for the two singles: "Countdown" and "Season's Call". The overseas version of the album was released on June 27, 2006. All songs were arranged by Hyde and K.A.Z, his future Vamps bandmate. It peaked at number 2 on the Oricon weekly chart.

== Themes ==
The Western press has noted Faith for its lyrics' spiritual subject matter as the album contains references to Christianity. In an interview with the German dark music magazine Orkus, the interviewer asked Hyde: "What can we hear from your latest release?" Hyde replied:

"The religious expressions and aspects. I am not a member of a special religion but when I was in Europe and visited some churches there, I felt this enormous power and I felt like my soul was being purged. And I wanted to create this atmosphere on my album.

== Tour ==
A five-month tour promoting Faith was scheduled, beginning in April 2006. Most locations are in Japan; however, after Hyde and Itachi signed on with Sony's North American-based Tofu Records, two concerts in the United States were added to the line up.

The first concert announced was scheduled for July 5, 2006, located in San Francisco, California. Shortly after tickets sold out for the event, a second concert was confirmed to be held July 2, in Anaheim, California. In the end, two US concerts as well as an appearance for a question and answer session in Anaheim at the anime convention Anime Expo, were added to Hyde's mini US tour.

== Track listing ==
No.	Title	Lyrics	Music	Length
1.	"Jesus Christ"	Hyde	Hyde	4:14
2.	"Countdown"	Hyde	Hyde	4:07
3.	"Made in Heaven"	Hyde	Hyde	3:44
4.	"I Can Feel"	Hyde	K.A.Z	5:09
5.	"Season's Call"	Hyde	K.A.Z	5:26
6.	"Faith"	Hyde	K.A.Z	4:41
7.	"Dolly"	Hyde	K.A.Z	3:35
8.	"Perfect Moment"	Hyde	Hyde	4:33
9.	"Mission"	Hyde	Hyde	5:18
10.	"It's Sad"	Hyde	K.A.Z	4:27

== Personnel ==
- Hyde – vocals, guitars, arranger, production, songwriter, mastering
- Craig Adams – bass guitar (tracks 2, 5)
- Sean Beavan – mixing
- Brian Gardner – mastering
- Scott Garrett – drums
- Lynne Hobday – vocals (tracks 7, 10)
- Steven Johnson – production
- K.A.Z – production, songwriter
- Shinya "Robot" Kishiro – production
- Kouichi Kobayashi – photography
- Keiji Kondo – engineering
- Stoeps Langensteiner – photography
- Danny Lohner – bass guitar (tracks 1, 3, 4, 6, 7, 8, 9, 10)
- Koichi Matsuoka "Dentsu" – art direction
- Satoshi Mishiba – piano (track 1)
- Michihiko Nakayama – executive producer
- Motiki Ohashi – art direction, design
- Takao Saiki – production
- Takayuki Saito – engineering
- Naoto Tanemura – engineering
- George Tetsumoto – production
- Osami Yabuta – photography
- Kazuhiro Yoneda – photography
