= Last Quarter =

Japanese manga series

- First tankōbon volume cover

下弦の月 (Kagen no Tsuki)
- Genre: Mystery; Romance; Supernatural
- Manga
- Written by: Ai Yazawa
- Published by: Shueisha
- English publisher: NA: Viz Media
- Imprint: Ribon Mascot Comics
- Magazine: Ribon
- Original run: April 1998 – June 1999
- Volumes: 3
- Live-action film
- Directed by: Ken Nikai
- Written by: Ken Nikai
- Music by: Kuniaki Haishima
- Studio: Shochiku
- Licensed by: Geneon Entertainment
- Released: October 9, 2004
- Runtime: 112 minutes
- icon

Last Quarter (Japanese: 下弦の月, Hepburn: Kagen no Tsuki) is a Japanese manga series written and illustrated by Ai Yazawa. It was serialized in Shueisha's shōjo manga magazine Ribon from the April 1998 to June 1999 issues. A live action film adaptation was released on October 9, 2004.

== Plot ==
Facing struggles with her father's remarriage and cheating ex-boyfriend, 17-year-old high school student Mizuki Mochizuki falls in love with Adam, a British musician, one night under the full moon. Captivated, Mizuki begins avoiding her family and friends to spend time with him in secret at an abandoned mansion. Two weeks into their relationship, Adam tells her that he will be leaving by sunrise, and Mizuki decides to run away from home to follow him. While crossing the street to him, Mizuki is hit by a car.

At the same time, 5th grade elementary school student Hotaru Shiraishi is also hospitalized from a car accident while looking for her pet cat Lulu and dreams of a girl who helped her look for her. After being discharged from the hospital, Hotaru's search leads her to finding the girl at the abandoned mansion and discovering she is a ghost, with Hotaru being the only one who can see her. The girl has no memories of her past life other than Adam and she is unable to leave the mansion. With the help of her classmates Sae Kayama, Tetsu Sugisaki, and Masaki Miura, Hotaru assists the girl with recovering her memories. The four children nickname the girl "Eve" due to her searching for Adam and they communicate through Hotaru's interpretation and Eve writing in Sae's notebook.

Miura initially identifies Eve as Sayaka Kamijo, but Hotaru states they look nothing alike. Sugisaki and Miura are then able to identify Eve as Mizuki, and the children learn that she is alive but in a coma, leading Hotaru to the conclusion that she will awaken if she is able to meet Adam again. They manage to identify Adam based on a song written by his band, Evil Eye, that Eve plays on the piano, only to learn that Adam had died in 1979, before Mizuki was born. At the same time, Eve begins recovering memories of another person.

The children soon discover that Adam's girlfriend was Sayaka, who died at age 17 from illness, leading them to realize that Sayaka has possessed Eve. Miura concludes that the only way to have Sayaka leave Mizuki is to give her closure by revealing Adam's death. Once Hotaru tells Eve the truth, Eve vanishes and reappears at the street where Mizuki's accident took place, while Mizuki's body takes a turn for the worse. Hotaru chases down Eve and convinces her that she is loved by her family and friends, giving her resolve to live. Once Eve disappears for good, Mizuki wakes up from her coma after Adam leads her out of her dreams.

At the end of the series, Mizuki returns to her normal life with no recollection of what had happened, and the children bury Sae's notebook inside the abandoned mansion. Through a monologue, Adam reveals himself to be a wandering spirit searching for Sayaka after his death, and he had managed to lure her during a moon cycle after she had possessed Mizuki; during their time together, he had also fallen in love with Mizuki. While she ultimately had been unable to follow him due to her willpower to live, Adam states that he will continue to watch over her.

== Characters ==
Mizuki Mochizuki (望月 美月, Mochizuki Mizuki) / Eve (イブ, Ibu)
Portrayed by: Chiaki Kuriyama (film)
Mizuki is a 17-year-old high school student who has recently been struggling with her father's re-marriage and infidelity from her ex-boyfriend. After meeting Adam one night, she is drawn to him in an instant and quickly falls in love with him, spending every night with him in secret for two weeks. When she attempts to pursue him as he is leaving, she is hit by a car and falls in a coma, awakening with no recollection of her past other than Adam. After meeting her, Hotaru and her classmates nickname her "Eve" and decide to help her recover her memories. However, they later learn that Sayaka Kamijo's soul has also possessed her, which leads her into confusing Sayaka's memories as her own.
Hotaru Shiraishi (白石 蛍, Shiraishi Hotaru)
Portrayed by: Tomoka Kurokawa (film)
Hotaru is a 5th grade elementary school student. She meets Eve while in a coma after a car accident taking place around the same time as Mizuki's while looking for her pet cat Lulu. Throughout the series, she befriends Eve and becomes dedicated in helping her recover her memories. Hotaru has feelings for Miura, but she later finds herself in love with Sugisaki.
Sae Kayama (香山 沙絵, Kayama Sae)
Sae is Hotaru's classmate and has been best friends with her since she saved the latter from being bullied in 3rd grade. She is strong-willed but she also comes from a strict family. Throughout the series, she becomes impressed by Miura and develops feelings for him.
Tetsu Sugisaki (杉崎 哲, Sugisaki Tetsu)
Sugisaki is Hotaru's classmate who comes from a family of doctors, with his father treating Hotaru at the clinic while she was in a coma. He is on the soccer team and has a cheerful personality. He finds himself falling in love with Hotaru throughout the series.
Masaki Miura (三浦 正輝, Miura Masaki)
Portrayed by: Motoki Ochiai (film)
Miura is Sugisaki's best friend and an attractive boy from class 1 who Hotaru initially is infatuated with. His parents are actors and he lives with his father after their divorce. He is level-headed and logical, but he is also noted by Sugisaki to be curt and disregarding of other people's feelings.
Tomoki Anzai (安西 知己, Anzai Tomoki)
Portrayed by: Hiroki Narimiya (film)
Tomoki is Mizuki's ex-boyfriend who cheated on her with her friend Aya. Tomoki reveals he is still in love with Mizuki and regrets what happened in their relationship.
Adam Lang (アダム・ラング, Adamu Rangu)
Portrayed by: Hyde (film)
Adam is a mysterious man with blond hair and blue eyes who Mizuki meets one night under the full moon. He is from London and is the lead singer of the band Evil Eye. Hotaru and her friends eventually learn that Adam died in 1979, presumably from drug addiction, after being distraught from the death of his girlfriend, Sayaka.
Sayaka Kamijo (上條 さやか, Kamijō Sayaka)
Portrayed by: Ayumi Ito (film)
Sayaka was Adam's girlfriend and pianist, and they met when she was studying abroad in England. She died at age 17 from an illness, and her soul later possesses Mizuki after being drawn to Adam's song.

== Media ==
=== Manga ===
Written and illustrated by Ai Yazawa, Last Quarter was serialized in Shueisha's monthly shōjo manga magazine Ribon from the April 1998 to the June 1999 issues. Shueisha collected its chapters in three tankōbon volumes, released from December 7, 1998, to November 15, 1999. It was republished in a two-volume aizōban edition on September 17, 2004, and a two-volume bunkoban edition on March 19, 2013.

In February 2024, Viz Media in licensed the manga for North American distribution in English, publishing the bunkoban version of the manga.

In 2022, Yazawa stated that she had initially moved on from using dip pens and brushes to illustrate manga after the conclusion of Neighborhood Story in 1996; however, she mentioned that she returned to using those tools for Last Quarter, as she felt that they helped convey the mood of the story better.

==== Volumes ====
===== Tankōbon edition =====
| No. | Release date | ISBN |
|---|---|---|
| 1 | December 7, 1998 | 4-08-856114-7 |
| 2 | May 14, 1999 | 4-08-856143-0 |
| 3 | November 15, 1999 | 4-08-856173-2 |

===== Aizōban edition =====
| No. | Release date | ISBN |
|---|---|---|
| 1 | September 17, 2004 | 4-08-782083-1 |
| 2 | September 17, 2004 | 4-08-782084-X |

===== Bunkoban edition =====
| No. | Original release date | Original ISBN | English release date | English ISBN |
|---|---|---|---|---|
| 1 | March 19, 2013 | 978-4-08-619421-1 | September 3, 2024 | 978-1-9747-4353-7 |
| 2 | March 19, 2013 | 978-4-08-619422-8 | January 7, 2025 | 978-1-9747-5156-3 |

=== Film ===
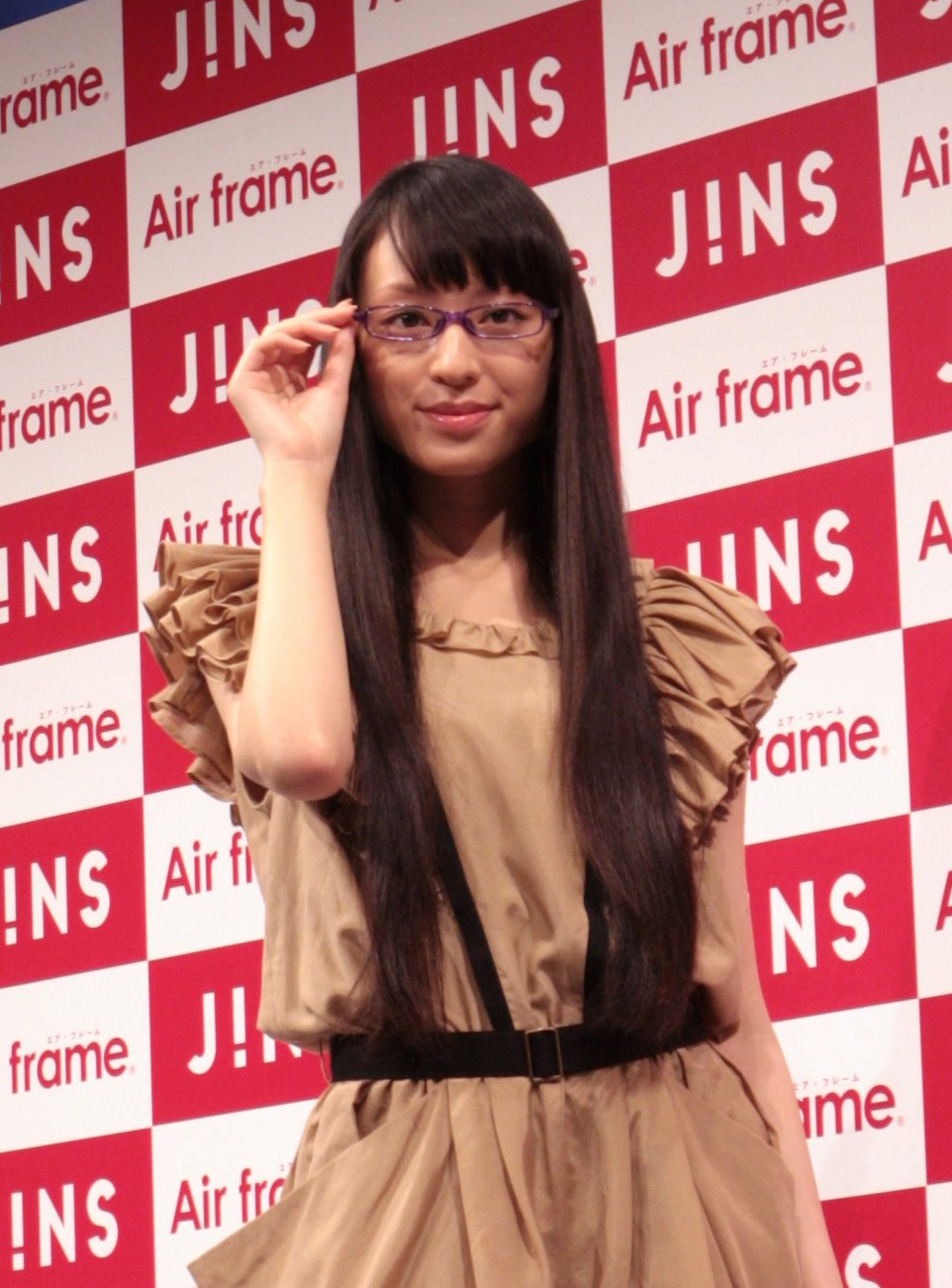
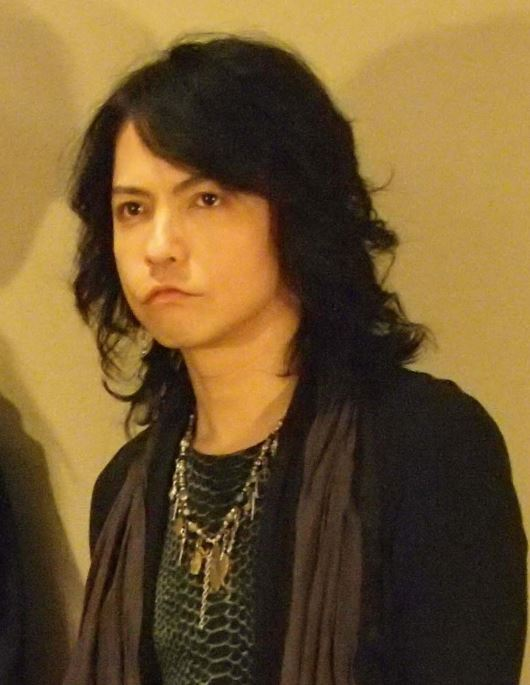
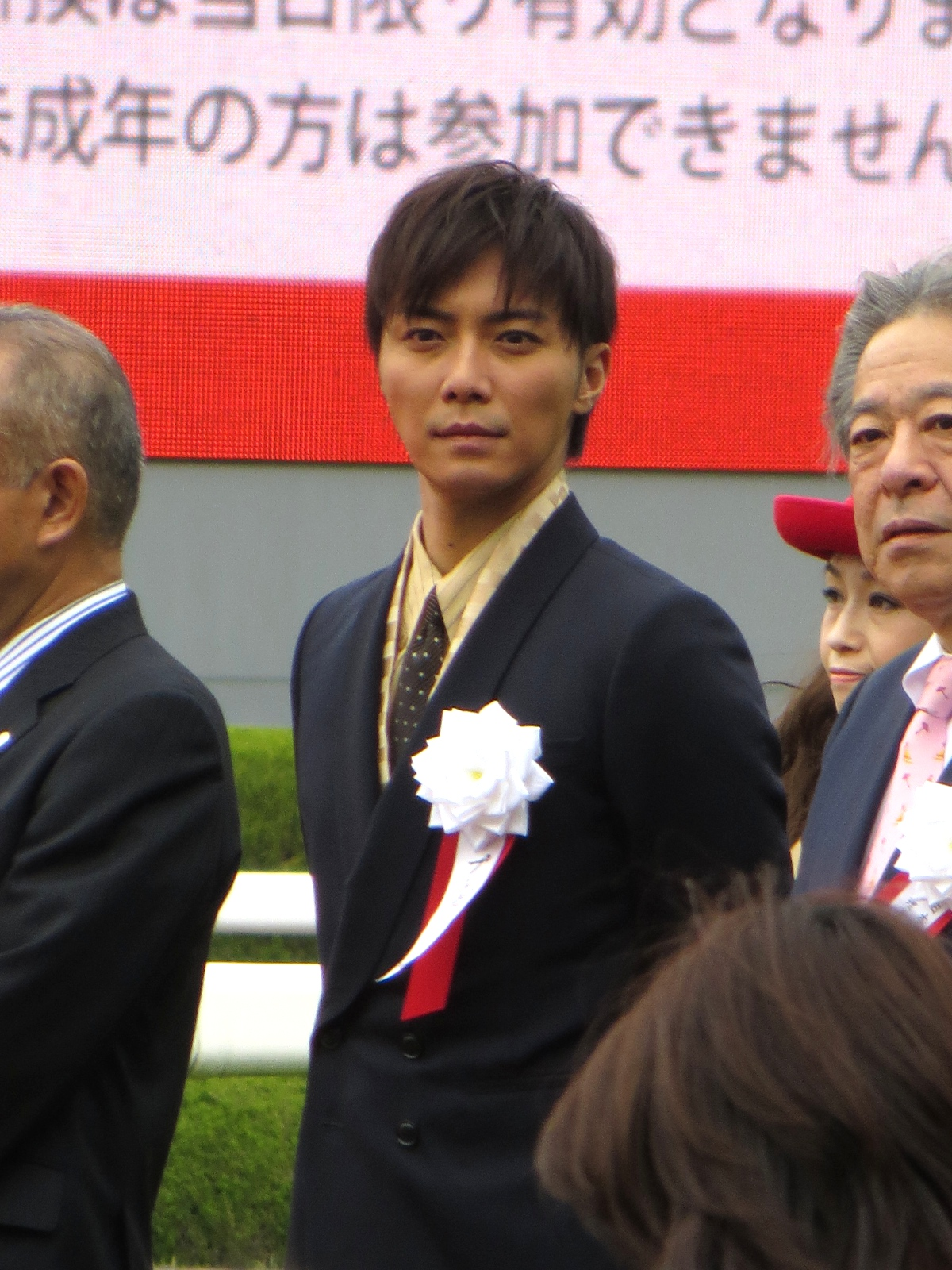
(From left to right) Chiaki Kuriyama (2010), Hyde (2013), and Hiroki Narimiya (2015) starred in the 2004 live-action film adaptation.

A live action film adaptation, written and directed by Ken Nikai and distributed by Shochiku, premiered in Japan on October 9, 2004. It stars Chiaki Kuriyama as Mizuki, Hyde as Adam, and Hiroki Narimiya as Tomoki. Additional cast members include Tomoka Kurokawa as Hotaru and Motoki Ochiai as Miura. The film's theme song is "The Cape of Storms" by Hyde. A music video for the song was filmed and featured in the film to promote the Japanese release of the English version of Hyde's debut studio album Roentgen (titled Roentgen English in Japan). The film grossed ¥247,000,000 at box office. The film was licensed by Geneon Entertainment for North American distribution in English, and it was released on DVD on July 4, 2006. The film saw several changes from the manga, such as making Mizuki, Hotaru, and Miura older.

== Reception ==
Animefringe columnist Steve Diabo stated that Last Quarter immediately ranked in the Top 10 New Manga in May 1998. Editors at Anime News Network reviewed Last Quarter favorably, praising the artwork, storytelling, and tone. Sequential Tart stated that the story became more interesting after Hotaru's introduction. The manga has been nominated for the Eisner Awards's Best U.S. Edition of International Material—Asia category in 2025.

For the live-action film adaptation, Anime News Network panned Hyde's acting and the film's cinematography.
