= Moshi mo Negai ga... =

"もしも願いが．．．"

Single by Nami Tamaki
- B-side: "MAGIC 好きやで～愛しい人へ～"
- Released: October 14, 2009
- Genre: J-pop
- Label: Universal Music Japan

Nami Tamaki singles chronology
"Friends!" (2009)	"もしも願いが．．．" (2009)	"思い出になるの？(Omoide ni Naru no?)" (2010)

"もしも願いが．．．" is the 18th single to be released by Nami Tamaki. It is also being used as the image song for the Nintendo Wii Version of VALHALLA KNIGHTS. It is also Nami's first ballad single since 2007. This single sold out 3,408 copies for first week and rank at #20 on Oricon weekly chart.

== Music video ==
The music video features Nami walking down the streets of Japan, as well as inside a room with a window overlooking the city.

== Single versions ==
The single comes in 3 different versions. A CD+Calendar Version and a CD+DVD Version and a CD Version.
