= Friends! =

Single by Nami Tamaki
- B-side: Negai Hoshi; Happy Forever; Mata ne
- Released: July 29, 2009
- Genre: J-pop
- Label: Universal Music Japan
- Songwriters: Chihiro Close, Masaaki Asada

Nami Tamaki singles chronology
"'Negai Hoshi'" (2009)	"Friends!" (2009)	"'Moshi mo Negai ga...'" (2009)

"Friends!" is the seventeenth single released by Nami Tamaki on July 29, 2009. It is her second single of 2009. The song was used as the Dariya beauty salon chain 'Palty' campaign CM song, as well as the NTV news show NNN News Real Time August theme song.

The single was released in three versions: two limited CD+DVD versions and a regular version. Each version had a unique B-side. The track "Mata ne" (またね; "See You Later") was written for Tamaki by the electronic band Hi-Fi Camp. The song "Negai Hoshi" (願い星; "Wish Star") was used as the theme song for the Nintendo Wii game, Arc Rise Fantasia. It was originally released as a digital single on June 3, 2009.

== Music video ==
The PV opens with Tamaki walking through a darkly lit grocery store, picking up various items off the shelves. It then shows her winking at the camera. The music then starts to play as Tamaki dances in a brightly lit grocery store with two of her friends. It occasional shows clips of Tamaki dancing and singing in with a pink background behind her as well as a mirror. The song ends with Tamaki smiling at the camera.

== Track listings ==
=== Standard Version ===
No.	Title	Writer(s)	Arranger	Length
1.	"Friends!"	Chihiro Close, Masaaki Asada	Masaaki Asada	3:47
2.	"Mata ne (またね; See You Later)"	Hi-Fi Camp	Hi-Fi Camp	4:35
3.	"Friends! (Instrumental)"	Chihiro Close, Masaaki Asada	Masaaki Asada	3:47

=== Limited Edition A (CD+DVD) ===
==== CD ====
No.	Title	Writer(s)	Arranger	Length
1.	"Friends!"	Chihiro Close, Masaaki Asada	Masaaki Asada	3:47
2.	"Negai Hoshi (願い星; Wish Star)"	Maki Iwasa, Susumu Kawai	Takeshi Ikezawa	5:27
3.	"Friends! (Instrumental)"	Chihiro Close, Masaaki Asada	Masaaki Asada	3:47

==== DVD ====
1. Friends! (music video)

=== Limited Edition B (CD+DVD) ===
==== CD ====
No.	Title	Writer(s)	Arranger	Length
1.	"Friends!"	Chihiro Close, Masaaki Asada	Masaaki Asada	3:47
2.	"Happy Forever"	Kenko-P, Kazuya Fukuda	Hiroto Suzuki	3:32
3.	"Friends! (Instrumental)"	Chihiro Close, Masaaki Asada	Masaaki Asada	3:47

==== DVD ====
1. Friends! (Dance PV Version)
2. Friends! (Making of)
