= Season's Call =

Single by Hyde

from the album Faith
- Released: February 22, 2006
- Genre: Pop punk; alternative rock; post-grunge
- Length: 10:35
- Label: Ki/oon Records / Haunted Records
- Songwriters: Hyde, K.A.Z

Hyde singles chronology
""Countdown"" (2006)	"Season's Call" (2006)	""Who's Gonna Save Us"" (2018)

"Season's Call" is the Japanese singer, Hyde's seventh single and second single from his album Faith, released 22 February 2006. This is the second single co-produced by Hyde and K.A.Z and has a bonus track "Unexpected (Dist.)", a rock version of the first track from Hyde's first solo album Roentgen (2002).

"Season's Call" was used as the second opening theme for the Japanese anime Blood+ and topped Oricon charts, returning Hyde to the #1 position on the charts after his successful sixth single "Countdown". It was certified gold by RIAJ for selling over 100,000 copies and was the 97th best-selling single in Japan in 2006.

Two editions of this single were released. The normal contained just the audio CD. The "limited edition," in addition to the audio CD, came with a DVD of the "Season's Call" music video and Blood+ sticker.

== Track listing ==
No.	Title	Length
1.	"Season's Call"	5:22
2.	"Unexpected (Dist.)"	5:13
