= Hyde Run =

2021 video game

- Developer(s): Grounding
- Publisher(s): Phoenixx
- Platform(s): iOS, Android
- Release: 2021
- Genre(s): Endless runner
- Mode(s): Single-player

Hyde Run is a 2021 endless runner game developed by Grounding and published by Phoenixx, in commemoration of the 20th anniversary of musician Hyde's solo career. It is set in Neo-Tokyo. In the game, the player is represented by a caricature of Hyde, which they can dress up in various outfits and decorate a room for using items earned in the running game. Gameplay is described as simple running action, featuring jumping and running on walls.

In August 2022, shortly after the first anniversary of the game, users could register a username and enter the Hyde Run Ranking.
