= Ken's Bar II =

Studio album by Ken Hirai
- Released: May 27, 2009

Ken Hirai chronology
Fakin' Pop (2008)	Ken's Bar II (2009)

Ken's Bar II is the cover album by Japanese pop singer Ken Hirai.

== Track listing ==
No.	Title	Writer(s)	Original performer	Length
1.	"Open"
2.	"Even If (Instrumental)"	Ken Hirai	Ken Hirai
3.	"New York State of Mind"	Billy Joel	Billy Joel
4.	"Boku ga Don'na ni Kimi wo Sukika, Kimi wa Shiranai (僕がどんなに君を好きか､君は知らない)"	Seishiro Kusunose, Rui Serizawa	Seishiro Kusunose
5.	"Love (Destiny)"	Ayumi Hamasaki, Tsunku	Ayumi Hamasaki
6.	"Desperado"	Don Henley, Glenn Frey	Eagles
7.	"Moon River"	Johnny Mercer, Henry Mancini	Andy Williams
8.	"Intermission"
9.	"Because of You"	Eriksen, Hermansen, Smith	Ne-Yo
10.	"Lately"	Stevie Wonder	Stevie Wonder
11.	"The Parting Song (Wakareuta) (わかれうた)" (featuring Masamune Kusano on vocals)	Miyuki Nakajima	Miyuki Nakajima
12.	"Heart of Mine"	Robert Hunter Caldwell, Dennis Matkosky, Jason Randolph Scheff	Bobby Caldwell
13.	"Shiroi Koibitotachi (白い恋人達)"	Keisuke Kuwata	Keisuke Kuwata
14.	"Close"
15.	"Stardust" (sampling vocals by Hibari Misora)	Hoagy Carmichael, Mitchell Parish	Hoagy Carmichael's Orchestra

== Oricon sales charts (Japan) ==
Release	Chart	Peak position	Debut sales	Sales total (copies)	Chart run
May 27, 2009	Oricon Daily Albums Chart	1	15,648 (first day sales)	122,208	12 weeks
May 27, 2009	Oricon Weekly Albums Chart	2	64,570	122,208	12 weeks
May 27, 2009	Oricon Monthly Albums Chart	6		122,208	12 weeks
May 27, 2009	Oricon Yearly Albums Chart			122,208	12 weeks
