= Boku wa Kimi ni Koi o Suru =

Single by Ken Hirai
- Released: October 21, 2009
- Recorded: 2009
- Genre: Pop
- Length: 18:37
- Label: Defstar Records
- Songwriters: Ken Hirai, Kōki Mitani, Nao Tanaka

Ken Hirai singles chronology
"Candy" (2009)	"Boku wa Kimi ni Koi o Suru" (2009)

Alternative cover
- Limited edition cover

Music video
- "Boku wa Kimi ni Koi o Suru" on YouTube

"Boku wa Kimi ni Koi o Suru" (僕は君に恋をする; lit. "I Will Love You") is Ken Hirai's thirty-second single, released on October 21, 2009, just a month after "Candy". The single was released in two formats: limited CD+DVD and regular CD only editions. The title song was written for the movie Boku no Hatsukoi o Kimi ni Sasagu (僕の初恋をキミに捧ぐ, I'll Give You My First Love), starring Mao Inoue and Masaki Okada.

In 2011, the song was certified as being downloaded more than 500,000 times as a full-length download to cellphones.

== Track list ==
No.	Title	Lyrics	Music	Length
1.	"Boku wa Kimi ni Koi o Suru (僕は君に恋をする, Fall in love with You)"	Ken Hirai	K. Hirai	5:12
2.	"Hitori ja Nai (一人じゃない, Not Alone)"	Kōki Mitani	K. Hirai	4:50
3.	"Catch You"	K. Hirai	K. Hirai, Nao Tanaka	3:26
4.	"Boku wa Kimi ni Koi o Suru (Less Vocal)"		K. Hirai	5:09

Limited Edition DVD
No.	Title	Length
1.	""Ken's Bar II" Release Party Special!"

== Charts ==
=== Oricon sales chart ===
Release	Oricon Singles Charts	Peak Position	Debut Sales	Sales Total	Chart Run
October 21, 2009	Daily Chart	2		60,379	5 weeks
October 21, 2009	Weekly Chart	3	30,034	60,379	5 weeks
October 21, 2009	Monthly Chart (October 2009)	10		60,379	5 weeks
October 21, 2009	Yearly Chart (2009)	87		60,379	5 weeks

=== Billboard Japan sales chart ===
Release	Chart	Peak Position
October 21, 2009	Billboard Japan Hot 100	1
October 21, 2009	Billboard Japan Hot Top Airplay	1
October 21, 2009	Billboard Japan Hot Singles Sales	3

=== Physical sales charts ===
Chart	Peak position
Oricon Daily Singles Chart	2
Oricon Weekly Singles Chart	3
Oricon Monthly Singles Chart	10
Oricon Yearly Singles Chart	87
Five Music J-pop/K-pop Chart (Taiwan)	
Soundscan Singles Chart (CD+DVD)	3
Soundscan Singles Chart (CD-Only)	15
