= The Changing Same =

Studio album by Ken Hirai
- Released: June 21, 2000
- Recorded: Japan
- Genre: J-Pop
- Length: 60 minutes
- Label: Sony Music Records
- Producer: Ken Hirai

Ken Hirai chronology
Stare At (1996)	The Changing Same (2000)	Gaining Through Losing (2001)

The Changing Same is the third studio album to be released by Japanese singer Ken Hirai. It was released on June 21, 2000, under Sony Music Japan subsidiary DefSTAR Records. The name comes from a term coined by the poet Amiri Baraka.

Track titles are: "Here Comes K.H.," "Love Love Love," "Why," "Affair," "The Flower Is You," "Brighten Up," "K.O.L.," "Ladynapper," "Unfit in Love," "Wonderful World," "Turn off the Lights," "Rakuen 楽園," "Aoi Tori アオイトリ," "The Changing Same: Kawariyuku Kawaranaimono (変わりゆく変わらないもの)"

== Chart positions ==
Oricon sales chart (Japan)

Release	Chart	Peak position	First week sales	Sales total
June 21, 2000	Oricon Daily Albums Chart	1		
June 21, 2000	Oricon Weekly Albums Chart	1	381,180	1,263,000
June 21, 2000	Oricon Yearly Albums Chart	18		
