= Candy (Ken Hirai song) =

Single by Ken Hirai
- Released: September 23, 2009
- Recorded: 2009
- Genre: Pop
- Length: 17:02
- Label: Defstar Records
- Songwriter(s): Ken Hirai, Shōko Fujibayashi, Fu Snoy, Daisuke Sakurai, Akira, Masahito Nakano

Ken Hirai singles chronology
"Itsuka Hanareru Hi ga Kite mo" (2008)	"Candy" (2009)	"Boku wa Kimi ni Koi o Suru" (2009)

Music video
- "Candy" on YouTube

"Candy" is Ken Hirai's thirteenth single, released on September 23, 2009. It is his first single in over a year and five months.

== Track list ==
No.	Title	Lyrics	Music	Length
1.	"Candy"	Ken Hirai	Daisuke Sakurai	4:19
2.	"Furusa Saīda (フルサ・サイーダ, Nice To Meet You)"	Shōko Fujibayashi	K. Hirai, Akira	3:05
3.	"Do it !!"	K. Hirai, Fu Snoy	Masahito Nakano	5:04
4.	"Candy (Less Vocal)"	K. Hirai	D. Sakurai	4:20

== Charts ==
=== Oricon sales chart ===
Release	Chart	Peak Position	Debut Sales	Sales Total	Chart Run
September 23, 2009	Oricon Daily Singles Chart	3		12,697	3 weeks
September 23, 2009	Oricon Weekly Singles Chart	7	10,301	12,697	3 weeks
September 23, 2009	Oricon Monthly Singles Chart	46		12,697	3 weeks
September 23, 2009	Oricon Yearly Singles Chart			12,697	3 weeks

=== Billboard Japan sales chart ===
Release	Chart	Peak Position
September 23, 2009	Billboard Japan Hot 100	2
September 23, 2009	Billboard Japan Hot Top Airplay	1
September 23, 2009	Billboard Japan Hot Singles Sales	5

=== Physical sales charts ===
Chart	Peak position
Oricon Daily Singles Chart	3
Oricon Weekly Singles Chart	7
Oricon Monthly Singles Chart	46
Oricon Yearly Singles Chart	
Five Music J-pop/K-pop Chart (Taiwan)	19
Soundscan Singles Chart (CD-Only)	3
