= Gaining Through Losing =

Studio album by Ken Hirai
- Released: July 4, 2001
- Recorded: Japan
- Genre: J-Pop
- Length: 65:06
- Label: Sony Music Records
- Producer: Ken Hirai

Ken Hirai chronology
The Changing Same (2000)	Gaining Through Losing (2001)	Life Is... (2003)

Gaining Through Losing is the fourth studio album released by Japanese singer Ken Hirai. It was released on July 4, 2001 on DefStar Records (Sony Music Entertainment).

Four singles are featured on the CD along with two Double A-Sides from the singles ("Tug of War" from Miracles and "Taboo" from Love or Lust). The album was ranked #21 for 2001 by Oricon for best selling albums. The style of the album continue on his two following albums, Sentimentalovers and Life Is....

A concert DVD was later released. The concert was filmed at Budokan and was titled Ken Hirai Films Vol.4 Live Tour 2001 gaining through losing at the Budokan.

== Release ==
"Even If" is the first single taken from Gaining Through Losing. It was released on December 6, 2000 and reached #3 on the Oricon weekly chart, with a total of 360,000 sales. The track "Even if" appears on Hirai's fourth studio album, Gaining Through Losing. It was also included in his first best-of compilation released in 2005. The song was originally called "Bourbon and Cassis Soda" (バーボンとカシスソーダ).

The second single, "Miracles", was released released on February 15, 2001. The track appears on Hirai's fourth studio album, Gaining Through Losing.

The third single, "Kiss of Life", was released on May 16, 2001. The single's title song was the theme song to the drama Love Revolution. The song sold a total of 650,000 copies and reached number 2 on the Oricon weekly chart, remaining in the chart for a total of 29 weeks. It remained Hirai's most successful single until August 2002, when he released his first #1 single, "Ōkina Furudokei" (大きな古時計), a cover of My Grandfather's Clock.

== Track list ==
All lyrics are written by Ken Hirai, except Merry Go-round Highway and World's End (Taku Tada); all music is composed by Ken Hirai, except Kiss of Life, Tug of War (Hirai and Masahito Nakano), Merry Go-round Highway, Sweet Pillow (Nakano), Taboo (Maestro-T), Love or Lust (Hirai and Ken Matsubara), World's End (Makoto Kuriya).

No.	Title	Length
1.	"She Is!" (Arranged by Masahito Nakano.)
2.	"Kiss of Life" (Arranged by Masahito Nakano. Was used as the theme song for the drama Love Revolution.)
3.	"L'Amant" (Arranged by Ken Matsubara.)
4.	"Miracles" (Arranged by Maestro-T. Was the commercial song for Suntory.)
5.	"Tug of War" (Arranged by Masahito Nakano. Was the featured on "Miracles".)
6.	"Merry Go-round Highway" (Arranged by Masahito Nakano.)
7.	"Taboo" (Arranged by Maestro-T. Was featured on "Love or Lust".)
8.	"Sweet Pillow" (Arranged by Masahito Nakano)
9.	"Love or Lust" (Arranged by Masahito Nakano)
10.	"World's End" (Arranged by Makoto Kuriya)
11.	"Even If" (Arranged by Ken Matsubara)
12.	"Gaining Through Losing" (Arranged by Shirō Sagisu. In 2005, Hirai performed this song live as the grand finale in a celebration of his 10th year anniversary in music. The Taiwanese band F4 sang a Chinese version of this song, known as Meteor Rain.)

== Related works ==
- Kiss of Life was featured on Ken Hirai 10th Anniversary Complete Single Collection '95-'05 Utabaka. Kh Re-mixed Up 1 featured Kiss of Life (Hex Hector Remix). His "[Missin' you: It will break my heart]" single featured (S.O.U.L.remix=Sound Of Urban London).
- Kh Re-mixed Up 1 featured L'Amant (Da Lata remix).
- Miracles appeared on Ken Hirai 10th Anniversary Complete Single Collection '95-'05 Utabaka, on The "Kiss of Life" (Silent Poets remix) and on Kh Re-mixed Up 1 (Silent Poets remix).
- Tug of War was featured on the "Miracles" single and Kh Re-mixed Up 1 (United Future Organization Remix).
- Merry Go-round Highway appeared on Kh Re-mixed Up 1 (Dj ajapai mix).
- Taboo was featured on the "Love or Lust" single. and Kh Re-mixed Up 1 (a tip of M-Flo remix).
- Love or Lust appeared on Kh Re-mixed Up 1 (V.I.P. remix). and on Ken Hirai 10th Anniversary Complete Single Collection '95-'05 Utabaka.
- Even If was featured on Ken Hirai 10th Anniversary Complete Single Collection '95-'05 Utabaka.
