= 666 AM =

AM radio frequency

The following radio stations broadcast on AM frequency 666 kHz:

== Australia ==
- 2CN at Canberra, A.C.T.
- 4CC at Biloela, Queensland
- 4LM at Mount Isa
- 6LN at Carnarvon, Western Australia

== Belarus ==
- Radio Signal

== China ==
- Voice of the Strait in Fujian

== Iran ==
- IRIB Fars from several sites

== Japan ==
- JOBK at Osaka

== Philippines ==
Call Sign	City of License	Power (kW)	AM Stereo Compatibility
DZRH	Pasay City	50,000	Yes

== Portugal ==
- Antena 1 from several sites

== Spain ==
- EAJ-1 at Barcelona

== Vietnam ==
- VOV1 at Nha Trang

== Defunct ==
- Gold in Exeter, United Kingdom
- SWR cont.ra from the Bodensee transmitter in Rohrdorf, Germany; shut down on 8 January 2012
