= Un-balanced =

Studio album by Ken Hirai
- Released: July 7, 1995
- Recorded: Japan
- Genre: J-Pop
- Label: Sony Music Records
- Producer: Ken Hirai

Ken Hirai chronology
Un-balanced (1995)	Stare At (1996)

Un-balanced is a 1995 album by Japanese pop singer Ken Hirai.

== Track listing ==
1. Futari no Meiro 二人の迷路
2. Negative
3. Precious Junk
4. Egao 笑顔
5. Katahō zutsu no Ear phone 片方ずつのイヤフォン
6. Easy
7. Yaburitai 破りたい
8. Aozora 青空
9. Hanabira 花びら
10. White: Boku ni Aitai (僕に会いたい)
11. Star
