= 666 (Hyde album) =

Studio album by Hyde
- Released: December 3, 2003
- Genres: Alternative rock; hard rock
- Length: 45:41
- Languages: Japanese and English
- Labels: Haunted Records, Miya Records
- Producers: Hyde, K.A.Z

Hyde chronology
Roentgen (2002)	666 (2003)	Faith (2006)

666 is the second album by Hyde, released on December 3, 2003. The album reached number two on the Oricon Top 200 chart.

== Track listing ==
All music is composed by Hyde.

No.	Title	Lyrics	Length
1.	"Sweet Vanilla"	Hyde, Lynne Hodbay	4:00
2.	"Hello"	Hyde, Lynne Hodbay	4:07
3.	"Words of Love"	Hyde	3:44
4.	"Horizon"	Hyde, Lynne Hodbay	5:09
5.	"Prayer"	Hyde, Lynne Hodbay	5:26
6.	"Masquerade"	Hyde, Lynne Hodbay	4:41
7.	"Midnight Celebration"	Hyde	3:35
8.	"Shining Over You"	Hyde	4:33
9.	"Fruits of Chaos"	Hyde	5:18
10.	"Hideaway"	Hyde, Lynne Hodbay	4:27
Total length:			45:41

== Personnel ==
- Hyde – vocals, guitars, arrangement, production
- Anis – [speech] (tracks 3, 7–9)
- Lynne Hodbay – [English] (tracks 1, 2, 4–6, 10)
- Hiroki – bass
- Furuton – drums
- Shinji Takeda – saxophone (tracks: 3)
- K.A.Z – synthesizer, guitar, arrangement, production
