= Omoide ni Naru no? =

"思い出になるの？"

Single by Nami Tamaki
- A-side: "Omoide ni Naru no? (Does it become a memory?)"
- B-side: "Itoshi sa no yukue (Love's whereabouts) Rakuen (Paradise)"
- Released: February 17, 2010
- Genre: Pop, R&B
- Label: Universal Music Japan
- Songwriter(s): Jeff Miyahara.

Nami Tamaki singles chronology
"もしも願いが．．．" (2009)	"思い出になるの？" (2010)

"思い出になるの？" is the 19th single released by Tamaki Nami. The song marks the first to be released under the moniker "nami".

== Music video ==
Aired version: This version of the music video only shows Nami for 2 seconds. It instead focuses on many different women who sing along to the song, giving off the meaning and showing how a girl is affected by a boyfriend when he cheats on her. Many of the girls in the music video are crying or breaking down.

Nami Version: Much like the previous version, this one shows more shots of Nami singing the song, as well as showing emotions similar to that of the other girls in the PV especially when it appears that she is on the verge of crying. This version of the PV will be released on the DVD with her album STEP.

== Single versions ==
Unlike her previous singles, it comes in only a regular CD edition. Nami's face is hidden on the cover of the single, in order to show the fact that she is hiding her tears, as well as an attempt to market her as a fresh artist.
