= Precious Junk =

J-pop single by Ken Hirai

Single by Ken Hirai
- Released: May 13, 1995; October 1, 2000 (Re-released)
- Genre: J-pop
- Label: Sony Music Records; DefSTAR Records
- Songwriter(s): Ken Hirai and Yamashita Shun

Ken Hirai singles chronology
"Precious Junk" (1995)	"Katahō Zutsu no Earphone" (1995)

Music video
- "Precious Junk" on YouTube

Precious Junk is the debut single released by Japanese singer, Ken Hirai. It was released on May 13, 1995, under the label DefSTAR Records. The single charted for nine weeks, selling 44,000 copies, and peaking at #50 on the Oricon charts.

== Summary ==
- Upon being first released, the single debuted at #67 on the charts eventually rising to #50.
- The single was featured on Hirai's album Ken Hirai's 10th Anniversary Complete Single Collection '95-'05 Utabaka.

== Track list ==
1. Precious Junk
  - Written by Ken Hirai. Composed by Ken Hirai and Yamashita Shun. Arranged by Joe Rinoie.
  - Was the theme song for Fuji Television drama Ō-sama no restoran.
2. Orugōru (Music Box)
  - Written and Composed by Ken Hirai. Arranged by Joe Rinoie.
3. Precious Junk (Original Karaoke).
