= Fake Star =

Single by Ken Hirai
- Released: September 12, 2007
- Genre: J-Pop, R&B
- Label: Defstar Records, a subsidiary of Sony Music Japan
- Songwriters: Ken Hirai, Uru

Ken Hirai singles chronology
"Kimi no Suki na Toko" (2007)	"Fake Star" (2007)	"キャンバス/君はス．テ．キ♥" (2008)

Music video
- "Fake Star" on YouTube

"Fake Star" is an up-tempo song by Japanese pop singer Ken Hirai. It was used in a Meiji Confectionery commercial for Fran Aromatier. This is his third single of 2007 and his 27th of all time.

In the lyrics, Ken references the lyrics of his previous hit single, "Pop Star", and the song serves as a mirror-image of that single.

== Track listing ==
=== CD version ===
1. Fake Star
2. Fake Star: Ken's Swingin' Jazz
3. Pop Star x Fake Star (Mash up) remixed by Metalmouse
4. Fake Star: Less vocal

== Charts ==
Oricon Sales Chart (Japan)

Release	Chart	Peak position	Sales total	Chart run
September 12, 2007	Oricon Daily Charts	3		
September 12, 2007	Oricon Weekly Charts	6	32,009	
September 12, 2007	Oricon Monthly Charts			
September 12, 2007	Oricon Yearly Charts			
