= Fakin' Pop =

Studio album by Ken Hirai
- Released: March 12, 2008
- Genre: J-pop
- Length: 62 minutes 36 seconds
- Label: Defstar Records
- Producer: Ken Hirai

Ken Hirai chronology
Ken Hirai 10th Anniversary Complete Single Collection '95-'05 Uta Baka (2005)	Fakin' Pop (2008)

Fakin' Pop is the seventh original studio album by Japanese singer Ken Hirai. It was released on March 8, 2008 on the Defstar Records label (Sony Music Entertainment).

== Background ==
Fakin' Pop was Ken Hirai's first original album in nearly three and a half years since his previous original album, Sentimentalovers, and two years and three months since the release of his compilation album Ken Hirai 10th Anniversary Complete Single Collection '95-'05 Uta Baka.

== Reception ==
In a review for AllMusic, Adam Greenberg writes that "Ken Hirai shows some versatility in Fakin' Pop, bouncing around with his astoundingly clear voice from upbeat dance tracks to more emotional balladry with only minor hitches in the transitions." Greenberg characterizes most of the songs on the album as "well within the realm of basic J-pop", while arguing that "the ones that stand out have something special within them".

== Track list ==
1. Pop Star (4:40)
  - Written and composed by Ken Hirai. Arranged by Kameda Seiji.
  Was featured on a Japanese TV drama (October to December 2005).
2. Kimi wa Su・Te・Ki♥ (君はス・テ・キ♥; You are Beau・ti・ful♥)
  - Written and composed by Ken Hirai. Arranged by Akira
  Was the commercial song for Lipton tea.
3. Kimi no Suki na Koto (君の好きなとこ; Why I Love You) (5:25)
  - Written and Composed by Ken Hirai. Arranged by Kameda Seiji.
  Featured on a Japanese TV drama (January to March 2007).
4. Canvas (キャンバス) (5:52)
  - Written and composed by Ken Hirai. Arranged by Tomita Keiichi.
  Featured on a Japanese TV drama (January to March 2008)
5. Pain (4:23)
  - Written by Ken Hirai. Composed by Ken Hirai and Suzuki Dai. Arranged by Kameda Seiji.
6. fake star (3:41)
  - Written and Composed by Ken Hirai. Arranged by Uru.
  Was the commercial song for "Fran", a food product of Meiji Seika Ltd.
7. UPSET (3:08)
  - Written by Ken Hirai and Lisa Shirato. Composed by Ken Hirai. Arranged by Tanaka Choko.
  Was the commercial song for Docomo's Foma L705IX.
8. Utsukushii Hito (美しい人; Beautiful One) (5:05)
  - Written and composed by Ken Hirai. Arranged by Nakanishi Yasuharu.
  Was a commercial song for Shiseido Co. Ltd.
9. Elegy (哀歌(エレジー)) (5:18).
  - Written and composed by Ken Hirai. Arranged by Kameda Seiji
  Was the theme song of the movie, "愛の流刑地" (Ai no Rukeichi)
10. Twenty! Twenty! Twenty! (4:48)
  - Written, composed, and arranged by Kan.
  J-Wave 20th Anniversary Song.
11. By My Melody (バイマイメロディー) (5:12)
  - Written and composed by Ken Hirai. Arranged by Honma Akimitsu.
  Was au's LISMO commercial song.
12. Itsuka Hanareru Hi ga Kite mo (いつか離れる日が来ても; The Day May Come When Someday We Shall Part)(6:30)
  - Written and composed by Ken Hirai. Arranged by Takeba Satoshi.
  Theme song for film, あの空をおぼえてる (Ano Sora o Oboeteru, Remembering That Sky).
13. Shashin (写真; Photographs) (4:47)
  - Written and composed by Ken Hirai. Arranged by Akihasa Matzura.
  JRA's image song for 2008.

== Charts ==
Oricon sales chart (Japan)

Release	Chart	Peak position
March 12, 2008	Oricon Daily Albums Chart	2
March 12, 2008	Oricon Weekly Albums Chart	2
March 12, 2008	Oricon Yearly Albums Chart	28
