= Life Is... =

Studio album by Ken Hirai
- Released: January 22, 2003
- Length: 54:24
- Label: Defstar (DFCL-1092)
- Producer: Ken Hirai, Babyface

Ken Hirai chronology
Gaining Through Losing (2001)	Life Is... (2003)	Sentimentalovers (2004)

Life Is... is the fifth original studio album by Japanese singer Ken Hirai, released by Defstar Records on January 22, 2003. It reached number one on Japan's Oricon sales chart and has been certified for one million sales by the Recording Industry Association of Japan.

== Track listing ==
1. Strawberry Sex (4:26)
  - Written by Tada Taku and Ken Hirai. Composed by Nakano Masahito and Ken Hirai. Arranged by Nakano Masahito.
2. Revolver (3:39)
  - Written by Ken Hirai and Sean Garren. Composed by T.Kura and Sean Garren. Arranged by T.Kura.
3. Ex-girlfriend (4:13)
  - Written by Ken Hirai. Composed and arranged by Murayama Shinichiro.
  The B-side of Hirai's 15th single, "Strawberry Sex".
4. Ring (5:15)
  - Written and composed by Ken Hirai. Arranged by Tomida Keichi.
  Ending song for the Japanese TV drama Psycho Doctor.
5. Come Back (4:20)
  - Written by Ken Hirai and Angie Irons. Composed by T.Kura and Angie Irons. Arranged by T.Kura.
  This song was the double A-side of his single "Life Is...: Another Story".
6. Somebody's Girl (4:44)
  - Written by Fujibayashi Shōko. Composed and arranged by Uru.
  This song was the B-side of his single "Ring".
7. I'm So Drunk (3:40)
  - Written by Ken Hirai. Composed and Arranged by Akira.
8. Missing You: It Will Break My Heart (4:47)
  - Written by Ken Hirai. Composed and arranged by Babyface.
  This song was a collaboration with American producer Babyface.
  An English version of the song was included on the single.
9. 世界で一番君が好き? (Sekai de Ichiban Kimi ga Suki?, (Am I Your Favorite in the World?) (5:27)
  - Written by Tada Taku. Composed and arranged by Kuriya Makoto.
10. メモリーズ (Memoriizu, Memories) (4:29)
  - Written and Composed by Ken Hirai and Suzuki Dai. Arranged by Matally.
11. Life Is... (4:28)
  - Written and Composed by Ken Hirai. Arranged by Suzuki Dai.
  This was the commercial song for the video game Fire Emblem.
12. 大きな古時計 (Ōkiina Furu Tokei, Great Old Clock) (4:46)
  - Written and composed by Henry Clay Work. Translated to Japanese by Hotomi Kōgo. Arranged by Kameda Seiji.

== Charts ==
Chart	Peak	First week sales	Sales total
Oricon Daily Albums Chart	1		
Oricon Weekly Albums Chart	1	351,258	806,000
Oricon Yearly Albums Chart	10		
