= Hyde (musician) =

Japanese rock musician (born 1969)

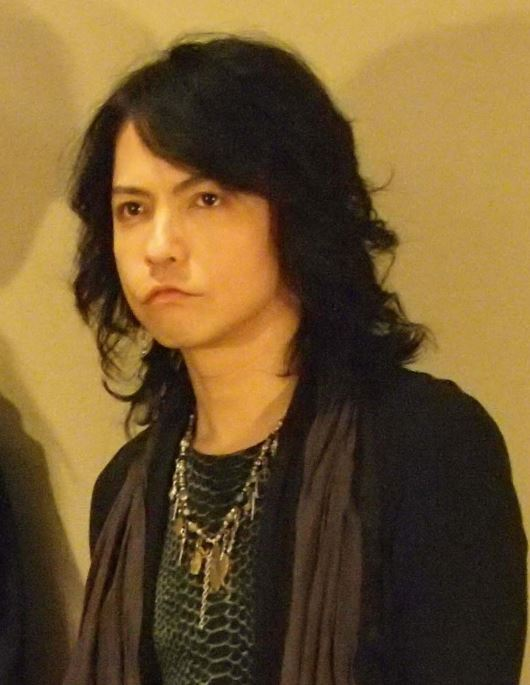
- Hyde at a press conference in 2013

Background information
- Also known as: HYDE P'UNK; HYDE DARK
- Born: Hideto Takarai (寶井 秀人); January 29, 1969 (age 57); Wakayama, Japan
- Origin: Osaka
- Genres: Alternative rock; hard rock; pop rock
- Occupations: Musician; singer-songwriter; record producer; actor
- Instruments: Vocals; guitar; keyboards; saxophone; harmonica
- Years active: 1988–present
- Labels: Ki/oon/Haunted; Gan-Shin(EU); Tofu(US)
- Member of: L'Arc-en-Ciel; The Last Rockstars
- Formerly of: Vamps
- Website: hyde.com

Hideto Takarai (寶井 秀人, Takarai Hideto; born January 29, 1969, in Wakayama, Japan), known by his stage name Hyde (stylized in upper or lowercase), is a Japanese musician, singer-songwriter, record producer, and actor. Best known as the lead vocalist of the rock band L'Arc-en-Ciel since 1991, he is also the lead vocalist of Vamps and has a solo career.

Hyde rose to fame in the 1990s as part of L'Arc-en-Ciel, who have sold over 40 million records and were the first Japanese act to perform a solo show at Madison Square Garden. He began a successful solo career in 2001, releasing several number one singles, and many of his albums have reached the top five on the Oricon chart. In 2008, Hyde teamed up with K.A.Z to form the hard rock duo Vamps.

Through both his solo career and Vamps, Hyde has collaborated/toured with artists such as Apocalyptica, Motionless in White, Starset, Yoshiki, Sixx:A.M., In This Moment, and Danzig, and producers such as Kane Churko, Nicholas Furlong, Drew Fulk, and Howard Benson.

== Early life ==
Hyde attended a vocational high school for art, where the majority of the students were musicians. Influenced by a friend who was a guitarist, he bought a guitar and started learning to play. Hyde was then invited to play his first show by his friend and fellow guitarist Hirai. Wanting to form a band with Hirai some time later, Hyde forced another friend to play bass and they used a drum machine. With Hirai having surpassed him on guitar, Hyde said he had to be the vocalist and quickly realized he was better suited to singing. It was at this point that he started to believe he could become a professional musician.

== Career ==
=== L'Arc-en-Ciel ===
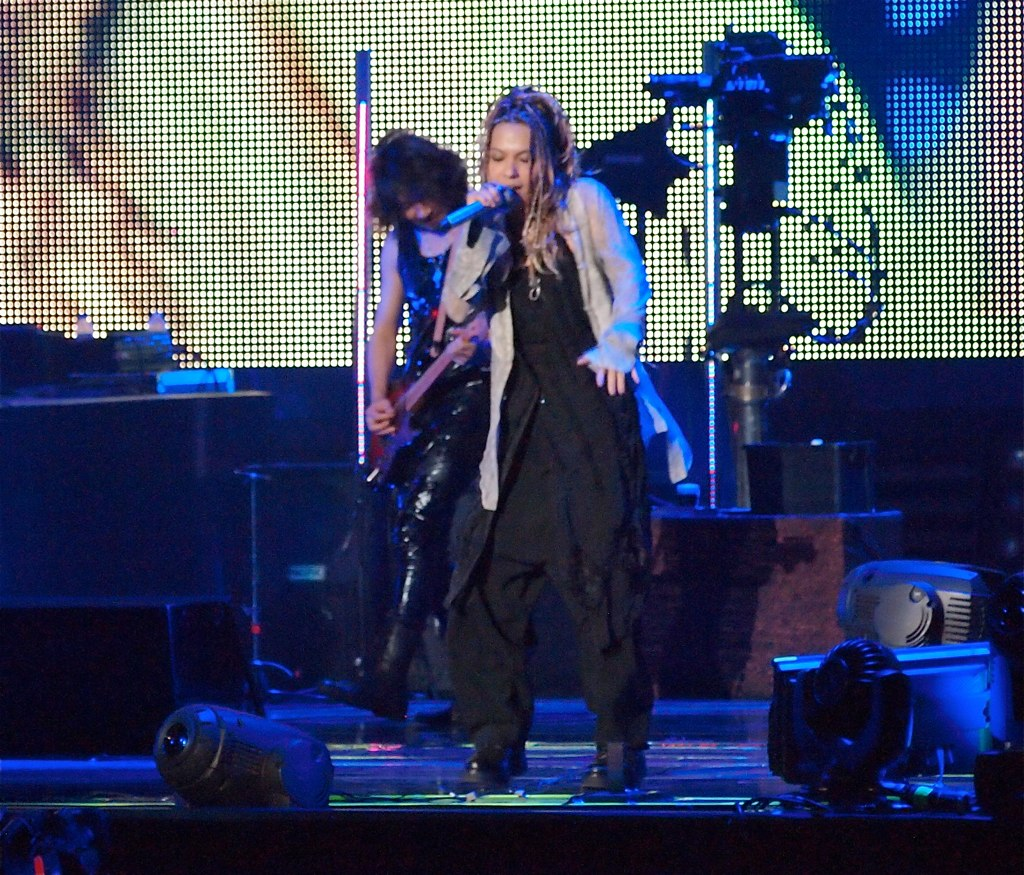
Hyde performing with L'Arc-en-Ciel at Madison Square Garden, 2012

After playing a session with Hyde, drummer Pero and guitarists Fuku and Taki, former Bystonwell bassist Tetsuya could not think of teaming up with any other vocalist and attended every concert by Hyde's band Jelsarem's Rod, until the vocalist agreed. In February 1991, Hyde, Tetsuya, Pero and guitarist Hiro formed the band L'Arc-en-Ciel. After gaining popularity in their hometown of Osaka, Hiro left the band in 1992 and Tetsuya convinced his friend Ken to quit his university studies and join the band as their guitarist. However, Pero then left the group on December 30, 1992. The following year, Sakura joined as L'Arc-en-Ciel's new drummer. They signed to Danger Crue Records, where they released their first album Dune in April 1993. It peaked at number five on Oricon's main chart, but topped its independent chart.

In December 1997, L'Arc-en-Ciel sold out the 55,000-seat Tokyo Dome in a record-breaking four minutes. Since then, L'Arc-en-Ciel has sold-out the Tokyo Dome 16 times. By 2003, L'Arc-en-Ciel expanded their market overseas and had their first North American debut at Otakon in Baltimore, playing to an audience of 12,000 people. In April 2008, their Tour 2008 L'7 Trans Asia via Paris led them to 7 cities across the world, where a total of 320,000 people were in attendance. By 2012, L'Arc-en-Ciel became the first-ever Japanese act to sell out Madison Square Garden in New York.

In 2003, HMV Japan ranked L'Arc-en-Ciel number 58 on a list of the top 100 Japanese pop acts.

Between the years 1993–2000, L'Arc-en-Ciel released 8 albums and in 1999, becoming the first Japanese musicians to not only release two albums simultaneously, but have both albums reach number 1 and number 2 on the Oricon charts, respectively.

After the success of their eighth studio album, Real, L'Arc-en-Ciel went on hiatus, during which each of the members pursued solo activities. Three years later, L'Arc-en-Ciel returned in 2003 for a series of seven concerts titled "Shibuya Seven Days" in June and July. In March 2004, their ninth album Smile was released, and the single "Ready Steady Go" became the opening theme for the anime Fullmetal Alchemist.

In the summer of 2004, L'Arc-en-Ciel officially debuted in North America, where they performed at the anime convention, Otakon in Baltimore, Maryland on July 31, 2004, as part of their Smile tour. The performance was their first international performance outside of Asia.

To celebrate their 20th Anniversary, L'Arc-en-Ciel held their 20th L'Anniversary concert at Ajinomoto Stadium in Tokyo, a two-day event held from May 28–29, 2011, with each day dedicated to one-half of their career. All of the proceeds from the concerts were donated to the Great East Japan earthquake relief efforts.

In 2012, L'Arc-en-Ciel released their twelfth studio album, Butterfly, at the beginning of their first world tour. The tour led the band to Shanghai, Taipei, London, Paris, Singapore, New York, Indonesia, Seoul, Japan, and concluded in Hawaii. On March 23, L'Arc-en-Ciel became the first Japanese act to ever perform at Madison Square Garden. At their concert in Hawaii, the mayor of Honolulu, Peter Carlisle, appeared at the show and declared May 31 to be "L'Arc-en-Ciel Day", saying he felt the band "made a great contribution to cultural activities, and built a bridge of friendship between Hawaii and Japan".

In 2014, L'Arc-en-Ciel performed at the National Stadium in Tokyo. A year later in 2015, the band put on yet another two-day event called "L'ArCasino", which was held outdoors at the Yumeshima Outdoor Special Stage in Osaka, constructed specifically for their use. L'Arc-en-Ciel announced a 23-city tour in 2020.

=== 2000–2003: Going solo ===
Hyde made his debut as a solo artist with the release of his first single, "evergreen" in October 2001. The single was released under Hyde's own record label, Haunted Records, which was a division of Sony's Ki/oon Records. After releasing two more singles, "Angel's Tale" and "Shallow Sleep," Hyde released his first solo album, Roentgen, in March 2002. An overseas edition featuring all-English lyrics was released in July of the same year.

In April 2003, Hyde starred alongside fellow Japanese rock musician Gackt in the film Moon Child, which was co-written by Gackt himself. The duo performed the duet "Orenji no Taiyou", which was used as the movie's theme song. The song was also released on Gackt's fourth full-length album, Crescent.

Hyde followed up Roentgen with the release of two singles, "Hello" and "Horizon", in June and November 2003, respectively. "Horizon" was used as the ending theme in Ryuhei Kitamura's film Sky High. His second solo album, 666, was released in December 2003. That same month, Hyde's song "Shining Over You" was used as the commercial theme for the video game Baten Kaitos: Eternal Wings and the Lost Ocean.

In early 2004, Hyde began off his first-ever solo tour "Hyde 2004 First Tour: 666", which spanned 11 cities and 21 shows across Japan. In fall 2004, Hyde starred in his second film, Kagen no Tsuki, a live-action film adaption of the manga created by Ai Yazawa. In the film, Hyde's song "The Cape of Storms" from his previously released Roentgen album was used as a plot line, and became the unofficial theme song for the movie.

=== 2005–2006: Faith and going international ===
In the summer of 2005, L'Arc-en-Ciel released their 10th studio album, Awake. However, Hyde continued his solo activities in conjunction with L'Arc-en-Ciel's work. He composed the music for the song "Glamorous Sky", which was used in the live-action film adaption of Nana, the popular manga by Ai Yazawa. "Glamorous Sky" was performed by the movie's star Mika Nakashima, with Yazawa writing the lyrics. In August, Hyde and Nakashima performed "Glamorous Sky" live for the first time on the music program Music Station, with Hyde on guitar.

Hyde's fifth solo single "Countdown" was released in October 2005 as the first song to be released off his album Faith. The single was released in both Japanese and English, and featured a hard rock version of Hyde's single "Evergreen". The Japanese version of "Countdown" was used for the Japanese version of Stealth (film).

A cover of "Countdown" was used as the "semi-final" stage song in the Nintendo DS rhythm game, Moero! Nekketsu Rhythm Damashii Osu! Tatakae! Ouendan 2.

Later that month, Hyde hosted "Halloween of the Living Dead", a three-night event held at Club Citta from October 29–31, marking the first of many Halloween concerts to come. Each night of "Halloween of the Living Dead" featured performances not only by Hyde himself, but by other well-known Japanese musicians as well . Hyde created the special Halloween band, Jack-O-Lantern, specifically for the event, which consisted Hyde himself and the band, Monoral. Other artists/bands who took part in the three-day Halloween event included Uverworld, Olivia Lufkin, High and Mighty Color, Yasu (Janne Da Arc / Acid Black Cherry), and Mika Nakashima. Jack-O-Lantern played covers of their own respective works, as well as a cover of the original "Ghostbusters" theme song.

Hyde's single "Season's Call" was released in February 2006 as the second opening theme to the anime Blood+ and was the second single to be released off his album Faith. Faith was released in April 2006, and was the first full-length collaboration between Hyde and K.A.Z, with all songs arranged by the duo.

In 2006, Hyde signed on with Tofu Records as a solo artist, and in June 2006, an overseas version of Faith was released which included a bonus DVD featuring music videos for both "Countdown" and "Season's Call". Following the release of Faith, Hyde, supported by Tofu Records, launched his debut U.S. tour Hyde Faith Tour 2006 across several cities in California. A DVD was released in November 2006 which included documentary footage of Hyde's mini-U.S. tour.

=== 2007–2017: Vamps ===
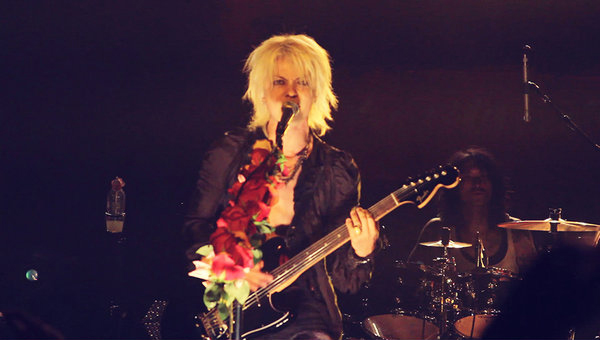
Hyde performing with Vamps in New York in 2010

In the spring of 2008, Hyde rejoined the guitarist, K.A.Z (Oblivion Dust), who had previously worked with him on both 666 and Faith, and formed the hard rock unit, Vamps. Vamps was signed to Vamprose, which was originally Hyde's own record label, "Haunted Records." Hyde assumed the role of lead vocalist, as well as rhythm guitarist, lyricist, and composer, while K.A.Z took on lead guitar, backing vocalist, and composer.

The rock duo released their first single "Love Addict" in July 2008. The first band's self-titled debut album, Vamps, was released in June 2009, just one month before their first international tour.

Following the release of their first album, Vamps launched a ten-date tour in the United States, beginning July 11, 2009, with performances in New York, Hartford, Columbia, Baltimore, Seattle, Portland, San Francisco, Las Vegas, San Diego, and Los Angeles. Their appearances in Hartford and Columbia were part of the Vans Warped Tour, making them the only Japanese act in the lineup that year. Their final performance in the United States took place at the Wiltern Theatre in L.A. and was later released on DVD. Vamps performed on board the battleship U.S.S. Missouri in Hawaii in early September, the first musical act to do so since Cher.

After the band's live tour in the U.S., they were named in the category "Billboard Japan Ranking International 2009" in recognition of their success overseas. In July 2010, Vamps released their second album, Beast. Hyde also debuted as a voice actor in Bakuman, playing the producer of the musician Koogy, a character who is voiced by Showtaro Morikubo. Vamps wrote a Japanese version of their song "Get Up" to be sung by Morikubo's character, which was used in the anime. They then recorded it themselves as the coupling track to their single, "Memories."

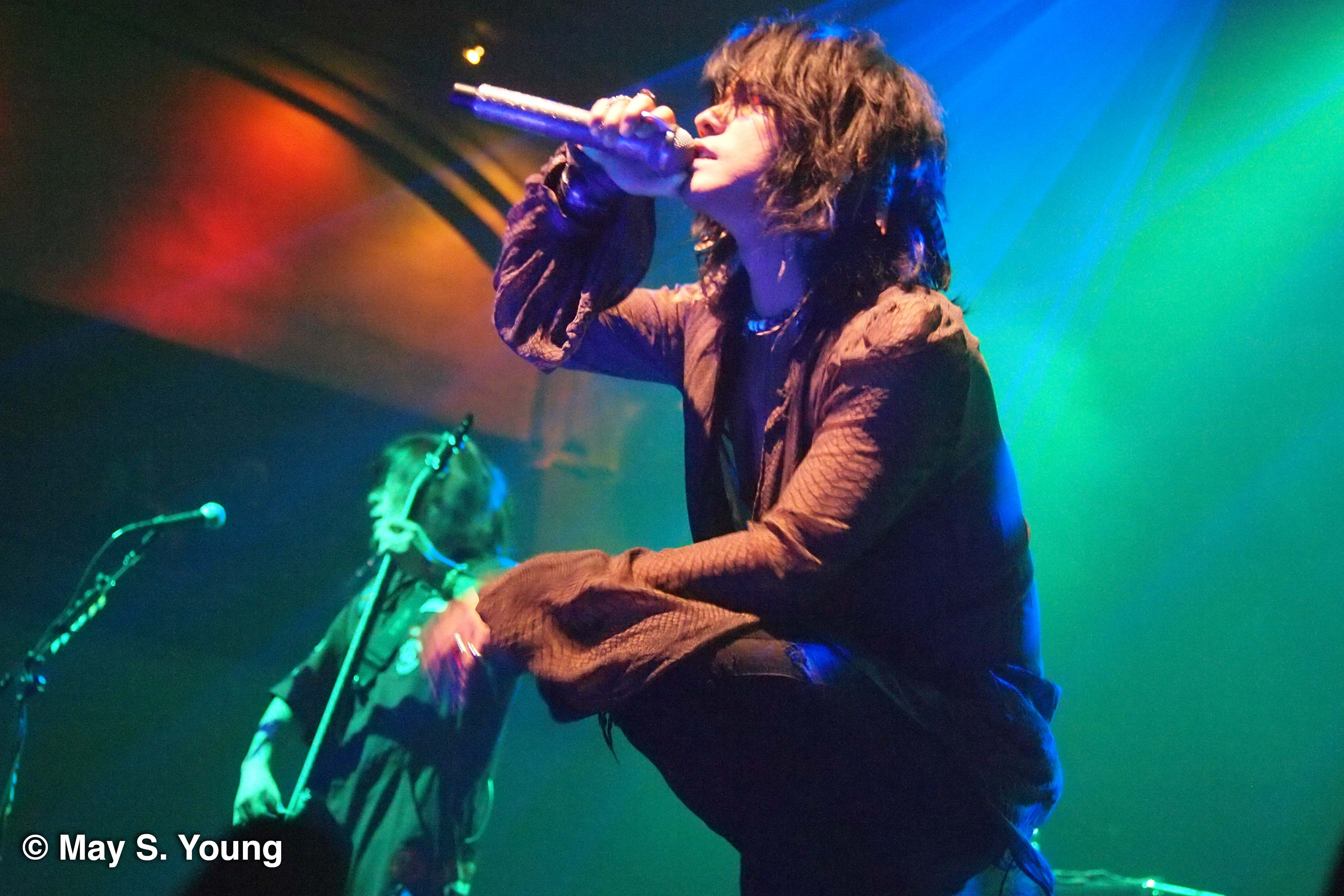
Hyde on stage with Vamps at the Roseland Ballroom, 2013

In 2013, Vamps signed on with Universal Music Group's Delicious Deli Records and released their first compilation album, Sex Blood Rock n' Roll. In support of Sex Blood Rock n' Roll, Vamps teamed up with Live Nation for their first European tour in years, which also included their first performance at a European rock festival, where they played the Download Festival 2014, held at Donington Park that year.

Vamps held their first-ever music festival, Vampark Festival 2015 in February at Nippon Budokan and featured acts such as Nothing More, Gerard Way (My Chemical Romance), Buckcherry, Sixx:A.M., and Apocalyptica. By April, they began their 2015 world tour in Jakarta before embarking on Sixx:A.M.’s U.S. “The Modern Vintage” tour as a support act. After the brief tour with Sixx:A.M., Vamps made their North American rock festival debut, performing at festivals such as Fort Rock, Welcome to Rockville, and Rock on the Range. They concluded their 2015 spring tour with a headlining show at the Best Buy Theatre in New York.

In addition to touring with Sixx:A.M. that spring, Vamps also headlined shows in Paris, London, Hong Kong, Taiwan, and all over Japan. In late summer of 2015, Vamps headed to Latin America, and then to the U.S. once more, heading to San Francisco, as well as a sold-out show at The Roxy in Los Angeles. They returning to the UK as special guests on Apocalyptica’s UK tour in late November in support of the two bands' collaborative single, "Sin in Justice".

In early 2016, the band headed to the studio in Los Angeles with Grammy-nominated producer, Howard Benson (My Chemical Romance, Three Days Grace), to work on recording music for their fourth full-length album, Underworld. Vamps also performed on MTV: Unplugged for the first time with Apocalyptica and the show would be released on DVD/Blu-ray later on that year.

They returned to North America at the end of the year, headlining major cities including New York, Los Angeles, Chicago, Toronto, and Mexico City, supported by rock band Citizen Zero.

Vamps released their 12th single, "Inside of Me" in September 2017, with the title track featuring the musician Chris Motionless of the band Motionless In White. Vamps co-wrote "Rise or Die", the single's coupling song, with Richard Kruspe (Emigrate/Rammstein).

Vamps' fourth album, Underworld, was released at the end of April in 2017. On May 27, 2017, Vamps performed at the Blackest of the Black festival, hosted by Glenn Danzig, marking their 4th U.S. rock festival performance, featuring major American rock musicians Ministry, Atreyu, Suicidal Tendencies, and Danzig. Vamps then returned to Japan for a summer tour, but returned to the U.S. once more in the fall, marking their final tour before going on hiatus.

=== 2018–present: Return to solo work ===
After Vamps announced their hiatus in the fall of 2017, Hyde resumed work as a solo artist, releasing his eighth single, "Who's Gonna Save Us" in June 2018, his first solo release in 12 years. Two more solo singles, "After Light" and "Fake Divine", were released in June 2018 and October 2018, respectively.

In 2018, Hyde collaborated with noted musicians such as Yoshiki and Mika Nakashima. Hyde produced Nakashima's single "Kiss of Death", which was released in March 2018, their second collaboration in 13 years. The single was used as the opening theme song for the anime Darling in the Franxx. Hyde collaborated with Yoshiki on the single "Red Swan", which was used as the opening theme song for the third season of the anime Attack on Titan. The song was released worldwide in October 2018, and features Yoshiki on piano and Hyde on vocals.

In the summer of 2018, Hyde launched his first solo tour in over a decade. Hyde Live 2018 tour commenced on June 29, 2018, in Tokyo and spanned across 7 cities in Japan, with a total of 33 performances. Hyde also invited the American rock band Starset, whom Vamps previously toured with, to open for him during his 7-day stint at Zepp Tokyo. In order to promote the tour with Starset as a support act, Hyde's vocal tracks were added to Starset's original song, "Monster". The track was then re-released as "Monster feat. Hyde" in Japan on August 10, 2018, and was released on the Japanese version of Starset's album Vessels. The tour ended in Fukuoka on October 14, 2018.

In early 2019, Hyde collaborated once more with Yoshiki on Hyde's single "Zipang". The title refers to an old way of saying "Japan" and was released in February 2019. The track featured Yoshiki on piano and Hyde on vocals, and its coupling song was a cover of Duran Duran's "Ordinary World". In March 2019, Hyde's 11th single, "Mad Qualia" was released as the theme song for the Japanese version of Capcom's video game Devil May Cry 5.

Hyde's fourth solo album Anti was released in digital format in May 2019, and later in CD format in June. Hyde teamed up with Drew Fulk (Bullet for My Valentine, Bad Wolves, Motionless in White) and Nick Furlong (Blink-182, Papa Roach, 5 Seconds of Summer, Diplo), among other producers, to write 10 songs for the album. The CD version of the album reached number 3 on the Billboard charts in Japan and marked his second full-length English album as a solo artist.

Hyde joined In This Moment on their 13-date U.S. Tour, beginning May 7, 2019, in Louisville, Kentucky. His tour stops also included an appearance at the Welcome to Rockville Festival in Jacksonville, FL (his set was cancelled due to severe weather), the Epicenter Festival in Charlotte, NC on May 11, the Japan Night concert in New York City on May 12, and concluded with a sold-out headlining show in Los Angeles on May 26.

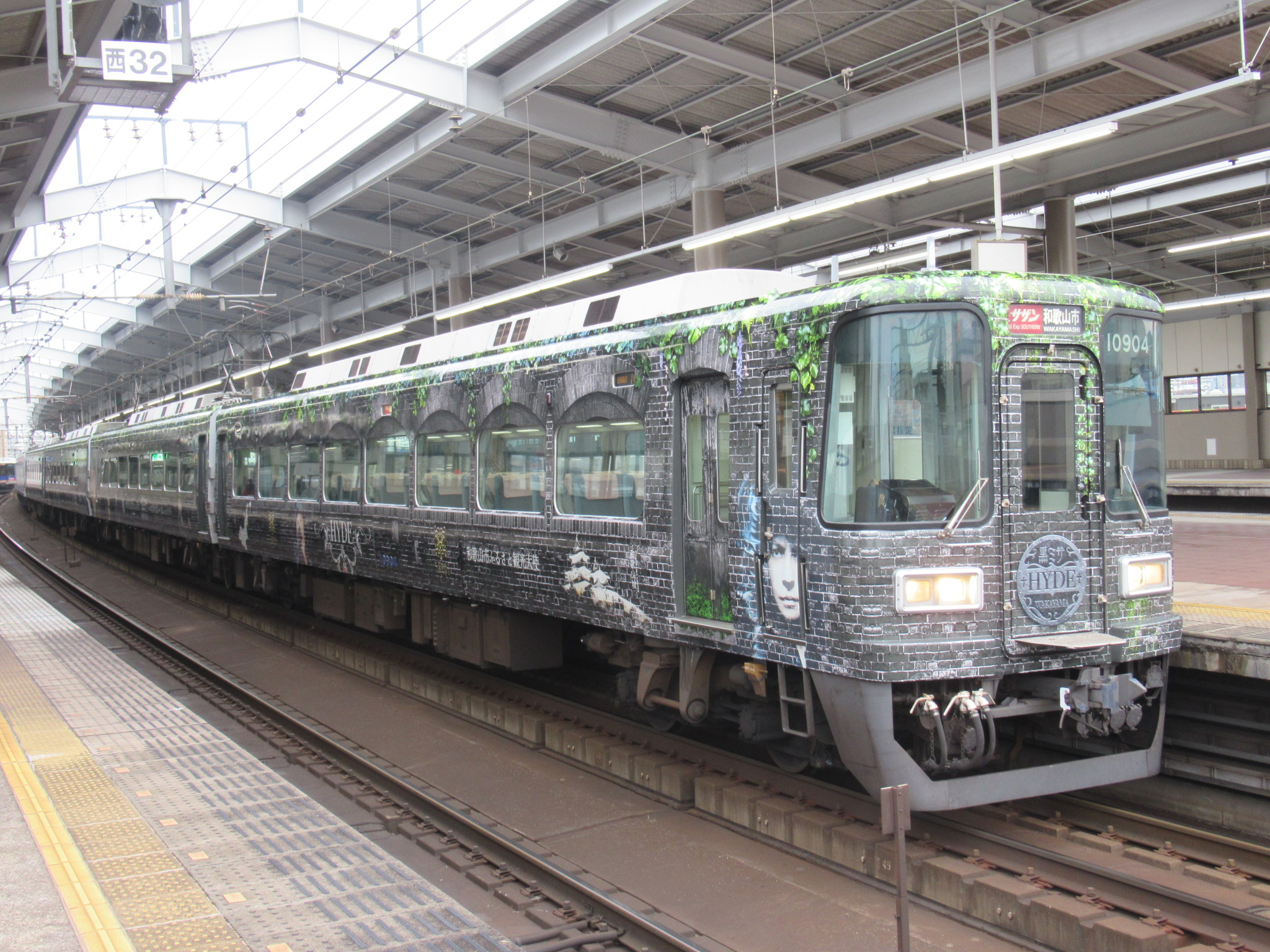
Hyde-themed train at Tengachaya Station in Nishinari-ku, Osaka

In conjunction with the physical release of Anti in June, Hyde embarked on a 26-date domestic tour that commenced in Tokyo on June 22 and ended in Sapporo on September 1, 2019. Following the conclusion of his domestic tour, Hyde was invited to tour as a support act for Starset on their 35-date U.S. “Divisions” tour.

Hyde became a tourism ambassador for his hometown, Wakayama, in January 2019, and following his appointment, a train service named "Hyde Southern" began operating between Namba Station and Wakayamakō Station in Wakayama Prefecture. The trains, decorated with images of Hyde and local landmarks, ran until October 2020.

By the end of 2019, Hyde concluded the fall with his arena tour Hyde Live 2019 Anti Final and ended 2019 by performing at the event Rockin'on presents Countdown Japan 19/20 on December 29.

In March 2020, Hyde released the single "Believing in Myself", which was composed for the 2020 Tokyo Marathon.

In April 2021, Hyde released the single "On My Own", which was used as the ending for the TV anime Mars Red.

In November 2022, Hyde was announced as a member of the supergroup The Last Rockstars, along with fellow musicians Yoshiki, Miyavi, and Sugizo. The group released their first single, "The Last Rockstars (Paris Mix)", in December of the same year.

In June 2023, Hyde released the song "Taking Them Down" which was featured in the Fist of the Northstar pachinko machines. A day later, Hyde started his 2023 "HYDE LIVE 2023" nationwide tour, spanning 7 cities, performing 18 dates, concluding his tour in September 2023, partnering up with Rakuten NFT, for the "HYDE LIVE 2023 Presented by Rakuten NFT" in Makuhari Messe Event Hall.

On September 6, 2023, Hyde released the song "6or9", three days before the concert presented by Rakuten NFT.

In 2023, Hyde collaborated with Yoshiki to perform "Red Swan" in the documentary film Yoshiki: Under the Sky.

In 2024, Hyde collaborated with My First Story on the singles "Mugen" and "Tokoshie", which were used as the opening and ending theme songs respectively, for the fourth season's Hashira Training Arc in the anime Demon Slayer: Kimetsu no Yaiba.

== Influences and style ==
Hyde has cited Dead End, D'erlanger, Gastunk, the Misfits, David Sylvian, Mötley Crüe, Depeche Mode, and Off Course as influences.

Hyde feels that his style of rock music works best with English lyrics. He first composes his music and lyrics in Japanese, and then works with American partners to translate the lyrics.

== Discography ==
=== Albums ===
Information
Roentgen
- Released: March 27, 2002
- Oricon Top 200 Weekly peak: #5
- Weeks on chart: 5
- Oricon Daily Chart: #5
666
- Released: December 3, 2003
- Oricon Top 200 Weekly peak: #2
- Weeks on chart: 11
- Oricon Daily Chart: #1
Roentgen (English version)
- Released: October 14, 2004
- Oricon Top 200 Weekly peak: #5
- Weeks on chart: 6
- Oricon Daily Chart: #5
Faith
- Released: April 26, 2006
- Oricon Top 200 Weekly peak: #2
- Weeks on chart: 8
- Oricon Daily Chart: #1
Hyde
- Released: March 18, 2009
- Oricon Top 200 Weekly peak: #4
- Weeks on chart: 14
Anti
- Released: May 3, 2019 (digital) / June 19 (CD)
- Oricon Top 200 Weekly peak: #3
Hyde (Inside)
- Released: September 13, 2024 (digital); October 16, 2024 (CD)
- Oricon Top 200 Weekly peak: #4

=== Singles ===
Information
"Evergreen"
- Released: October 17, 2001
- Oricon Top 200 Weekly peak: #1
- Weeks on chart: 7
- Oricon Daily Chart: #1
"Angel's Tale"
- Released: December 12, 2001
- Oricon Top 200 Weekly peak: #2
- Weeks on chart: 6
- Oricon Daily Chart: #2
"Shallow Sleep"
- Released: February 27, 2002
- Oricon Top 200 Weekly peak: #2
- Weeks on chart: 4
- Oricon Daily Chart: #2
"Hello"
- Released: June 4, 2003
- Oricon Top 200 Weekly peak: #1
- Weeks on chart: 8
- Oricon Daily Chart: #1
"Horizon"
- Released: November 6, 2003
- Oricon Top 200 Weekly peak: #6
- Weeks on chart: 6
- Oricon Daily Chart: #6
"Countdown"
- Released: October 5, 2005
- Oricon Top 200 Weekly peak: #1
- Weeks on chart: 8
- Oricon Daily Chart: #1
"Season's Call"
- Released: February 22, 2006
- Oricon Top 200 Weekly peak: #1
- Weeks on chart: 11
- Oricon Daily Chart: #1
"Who's Gonna Save Us"
- Released: June 20, 2018
- Oricon Top 200 Weekly peak: #6
- Weeks on chart: 7
"After Light"
- Released: June 29, 2018
- Oricon Top 200 weekly peak: #11
- Weeks on chart: 4
"Fake Divine"
- Released: October 24, 2018
- Oricon Top 200 Weekly peak: #7
- Weeks on chart: 4
"Zipang"
- Released: February 6, 2019
- Oricon Top 200 Weekly peak: #7
- Billboard Japan Hot 100: #10
"Mad Qualia"
- Released: March 20, 2019
- Oricon Weekly peak: #8
"Believing in Myself/Interplay"
- Released: March 18, 2020
- Oricon Weekly peak: 6
"Let It Out"
- Released: November 25, 2020
"Defeat"
- Released: December 25, 2020
"On My Own"
- Released: April 9, 2021
"Nostalgic"
- Released: June 25, 2021
"Final Piece"
- Released: November 24, 2021
"Pandora"
- Released: October 26, 2022
"Taking Them Down"
- Released: June 16, 2023
"6or9"
- Released: September 6, 2023

=== DVDs ===
- Roentgen Stories (2004)
- Faith Live (2006)

== Filmography ==
- Moon Child as Kei (2003)
- Kagen no Tsuki as Adam (2004)
- Bakuman voice of Hyde (2011)

== Video games ==
- Hyde Run (July 15, 2021, iOS/Android)
