= Roentgen (album) =

Studio album by Hyde
- Released: March 27, 2002; July 4, 2002 (international version)
- Recorded: 2001–2002 in London, England
- Genre: Acoustic rock
- Length: 48:36
- Label: Haunted Records, Ki/oon Records
- Producer: Hyde

Hyde chronology
Roentgen (2002)	666 (2003)

International version

Roentgen English
- The international version, as reissued in 2004 in Japan

Roentgen is the debut album by Hyde, released on March 27, 2002. It was released on his own label Haunted Records, a division of Sony's Ki/oon Records. The cover of the regular edition is an X-ray of Hyde's own skull. "The Cape of Storms" was used as the theme song for the movie Last Quarter (2004), which Hyde starred in. An English version of the album (titled Roentgen English in Japan) was released on July 4, 2002, worldwide and October 14, 2004, in Japan.

The album ranked fifth on the Oricon chart.

== Background and release ==
An English version was released overseas on July 4. A Japanese release of the English version, titled Roentgen English, was released on October 14, 2004. That version came with three bonus songs that were originally used as B-side's on Hyde's singles. The limited edition of the Japanese release came with a DVD that included the music video for "The Cape of Storms" and the audio only track; "The Cape of Storms -Last Quarter Mix-".

== Track listing ==
All songs written and composed by Hyde.

1. "Unexpected"
2. "White Song"
3. "Evergreen"
4. "Oasis"
5. "A Drop of Colour"
6. "Shallow Sleep"
7. "New Day's Dawn"
8. "Angel's Tale"
9. "The Cape of Storms"
10. "Secret Letters"

International version bonus tracks

1. "Evergreen (English Ensemble)"
2. "Angel's Tale (English Ensemble)"
3. "Shallow Sleep (English Ensemble)"
