= Pop Star (Ken Hirai song) =

Single by Ken Hirai

from the album Ken Hirai 10th Anniversary Complete Single Collection '95-'05 Utabaka
- B-side: "Tameiki Kip"
- Released: 2005
- Genre: J-pop
- Length: 4:43
- Label: Defstar
- Songwriter: Ken Hirai
- Producer: Ken Hirai

Ken Hirai singles chronology
| "Omoi ga Kasanaru Sono Mae ni" (2004) | "Pop Star" (2005) | "Bye My Melody" (2006) |

Music video
- "Pop Star" by Ken Hirai on YouTube

"Pop Star" is a song by Japanese singer Ken Hirai. The single went on to top the 2005 Oricon Charts and is known for its remarkable music video, featuring Ken in seven different personas, including a raccoon and his own manager. The Video also helped Hirai break into the US and Canadian markets where stations would play the video despite the fact that it was in Japanese.

The song is the theme song of the Japanese drama Kiken na Aneki starring Ito Misaki.

Hip-hop artist Kreva performed a parody of this song, "Rap Star", at his appearance at Countdown Japan 05/06 in 2005 and during his 2006 tour, Kreva Tour 2006 Ai Jibun Haku: Kokuminteki Gyoji.

== Composition ==
"Pop Star" is in the key of F major, a 4/4 time signature, and a tempo of 140 beats per minute.

The melody ranges almost 2 octaves from C_{3} to B♭_{4}. If including background vocals, the vocal range is 2 octaves and 2 semitones from C_{3} to D_{5}.

== Certifications ==
Certifications for "Pop Star"
| Region | Certification | Certified units/sales |
Streaming
| Japan (RIAJ) | Platinum | 100,000,000^{†} |
^{†} Streaming-only figures based on certification alone.

== In video games ==
The song is featured in the following music and rhythm games:

Games published by Nintendo

- Moero! Nekketsu Rhythm Damashii Osu! Tatakae! Ouendan 2 for Nintendo DS (in-house cover)
- Just Dance Wii 2 for Wii (Cover version by Ms. OOJA)

Namco games

- Taiko No Tatsujin 8 for arcades (in-house cover)
- Taiko No Tatsujin Portable 2 for the PSP
- Happy Dance Collection for Nintendo Wii

Konami games, under the Bemani brand

- Jubeat Ripple for arcades (in-house cover)
- Dance Dance Revolution Grand Prix for home PCs
