= Ken Hirai =

Japanese R&B and pop singer (born 1972)

Ken Hirai 平井 堅
- Born: Hirai Ken; January 17, 1972 (age 54)
- Origin: Higashiōsaka, Osaka, Japan
- Genres: J-pop, R&B, jazz, soul
- Occupations: Singer-songwriter, record producer
- Instruments: Vocals, piano, keyboards
- Years active: 1995–present
- Label: DefStar Records
- Website: kenhirai.jp

Ken Hirai (平井 堅, Hirai Ken; born January 17, 1972) is a Japanese singer-songwriter. Since his debut, Hirai has worked as a model, actor, composer, lyricist, singer, and brand ambassador.

During his career, Hirai has released forty-seven singles and eleven studio albums as of January 2024. According to Oricon, his single Hitomi o Tojite (Close Your Eyes) became the best-selling single of 2004 in Japan, while his compilation album Ken Hirai 10th Anniversary Complete Single Collection '95–'05 "Utabaka" became the best-selling album of 2006 in Japan.

== Early life ==
Born on January 17, 1972, in Higashiōsaka, Osaka, Ken Hirai grew up in Nabari, Mie.

== Career ==
=== 1995–2000: Un-balanced, Stare At, The Changing Same ===
Signing with Sony, he released his first single in 1995, but to no great success. Hirai used the next four years to consolidate his style and take time out – he only released one single each in 1997 and 1998, and did not produce any new music during 1999. Fans waited until 2000 for a third album from Hirai, The Changing Same. It was the first single, "Rakuen" (楽園; Paradise), that established him as a major player in the Japanese sales charts and overseas. Hirai was voted "Best New Japanese Act" in a pop poll organized by the RTHK radio station in Hong Kong.

=== 2001–2003: Gaining Through Losing, Life Is... ===
Hirai's 1st remix album, Kh Re-mixed Up 1 was released on November 28, 2001. Through the album, the artist showed a new part of himself to the audience, which appealed to club-goers and DJs for the first time. In the summer of that same year, Hirai earned the title of Best Male Artist at the inaugural MTV Video Music Awards Japan, and appeared at the official FIFA World Cup 2002 concert with Chemistry and Lauryn Hill.

Already an established star, Hirai went one step further when he released a cover of "Ōki na Furudokei" (大きな古時計; A Big Old Clock); a Japanese version of "My Grandfather's Clock" by Henry Clay Work) in 2002. A popular nursery rhyme, it was expected to be a minor success, but went on to become one of the biggest hits of the year.

In 2003, Hirai performed for MTV Unplugged Live in New York; he was the first Japanese male solo vocalist to perform on the show. He was also interviewed by CNN's The Music Room, televised in 210 countries and watched by 230 million viewers. His 5th album Life Is..., which contains "Strawberry Sex", "Ring", and "Ōki na Furudokei", was released on January 22, 2003.

On December 1, 2003, the concept album Ken's Bar was released. On the album, Hirai selected favorite songs and covered them in his own style. The music was primarily jazz and blues oriented.

=== 2004–2006: Sentimentalovers ===
In May 2004, Hirai launched his next album, Sentimentalovers. The album spawned four singles, with "Hitomi o Tojite" (瞳をとじて; Close Your Eyes) being the most successful, becoming the highest-selling single of that year.

Hirai's 2005 single, "Pop Star", was one of his career's biggest hits, reaching number one on the Oricon charts. The video for the song, which featured Hirai playing 7 different characters and animals, became an instant hit. A cover of the song was featured on the rhythm game Moero! Nekketsu Rhythm Damashii Osu! Tatakae! Ouendan 2 for the Nintendo DS, and Namco popular drumming game Taiko no Tatsujin 8.

=== 2007–2009: Fakin' Pop, Ken's Bar II ===
In 2007, Hirai released two singles. Both singles peaked at number 5 on the Oricon charts and sold around 100,000 copies. The first of these was "Elegy", followed by "Kimi no Suki na Toko (Why I Love You)". "Elegy" was a major radio success in Japan. In August 2007, Hirai released his 27th single, titled "Fake Star".

On February 20, 2008, Hirai released his 28th and 1st double A-side single, titled "Canvas/Kimi wa Suteki (You're Wonderful)". The singles debuted at number six on the Oricon charts. "Canvas" was used as the insert and ending theme song to Fuji TV's Hachimitsu to Clover. It was written and composed by Hirai, and arranged by Tomita Keichi, as was Hirai's 17th single "Ring".

On March 12, 2008, Hirai released his seventh studio album, Fakin' Pop. Hirai then released his 29th single, "Itsuka Hanareru Hi ga Kite mo" (いつか離れる日が来ても; If One Day I'm Separated From You) on April 23, 2008. The song was a recut single from Fakin' Pop, and used as the theme song for Ano Sora o Oboeteru (あの空をおぼえてる).

On May 27, 2009, Hirai released Ken's Bar II, continuing the concept of creating jazz covers of his favorite Japanese and English songs; these included "Love: Destiny" (Ayumi Hamasaki), "White Lovers" (Keisuke Kawata), and "Because of You" (Ne-Yo). He held a 2009 summer concert tour in Japan under the same name. On September 23, 2009, his 30th single, "Candy" was released, followed by "Boku wa Kimi ni Koi wo Suru" (僕は君に恋をする; "I'm Going to Fall in Love With You") in October.

=== 2010–2014: 15th anniversary, Japanese Singer ===
On October 13, 2010, Hirai's 32nd single "Sing Forever" was released. His 33rd single, "Aishiteru", was followed by a compilation entitled 'Ken Hirai 15th Anniversary c/w Collection '95–'10 "Ura Utabaka"' that celebrated his fifteenth anniversary in the music industry.

On May 4, 2011, Hirai released a new single "いとしき日々よ" for the Japan TV mega hit TV drama JIN-仁. On June 8, 2011, Hirai released his ninth studio album, Japanese Singer.

In 2014, he released the third in his series of song covers, Ken's Bar III, and a collaborative single with Namie Amuro called Grotesque.

=== 2015–present: 25th anniversary, The Still Life, Anata ni Naritakatta ===
On July 6, 2016, Hirai released his tenth studio album The Still Life.

In 2021, Anata ni Naritakatta (あなたになりたかった, I Wanted to be You) was announced as his eleventh studio album, released to commemorate his twenty-fifth anniversary. The album cover, taken with a heavy flash filter, represented the singer's desire to explore ego loss in his art: "I don't really have anything I want to convey, and it's more like I'm erasing my ego." Hirai commented, "I thought that erasing the contents of my face would best express my stance."

== Discography ==
- Un-balanced (1995)
- Stare At (1996)
- The Changing Same (2000)
- Gaining Through Losing (2001)
- Life Is... (2003)
- Sentimentalovers (2004)
- Fakin' Pop (2008)
- Japanese Singer (2011)
- The Still Life (2016)
- Anata ni Naritakatta (2021)
