= L'Arc-en-Ciel discography =

- Studio albums: 12
- Live albums: 1
- Compilation albums: 9
- Singles: 45

The discography of L'Arc-en-Ciel, a rock band from Osaka, Japan, formed in 1991. The group has sold over 14 million albums, 17 million singles, more than 2 millions VHS, DVD, and Blu-ray (BD) combine, and millions of merchandise, including home videos. In 2003, L'Arc-en-Ciel were ranked 58 on HMV Japan's list of the top 100 Japanese pop artists.

== Albums ==
=== Studio albums ===
Title	Album details	Peak chart positions	Sales/Units	Certifications
Title	Album details	JPN	Sales/Units	Certifications
Dune	Released: April 27, 1993; Label: Danger Crue Records	5		
Tierra	Released: July 14, 1994; Label: Kioon Music	7	JPN: 161,180	RIAJ: Platinum
Heavenly	Released: September 1, 1995; Label: Kioon Music	3	JPN: 390,640	RIAJ: Platinum
True	Released: December 12, 1996; Label: Kioon Music	1	JPN: 1,428,300	RIAJ: 4× Platinum
Heart	Released: February 25, 1998; Label: Kioon Music	1	JPN: 1,551,490	RIAJ: 4× Platinum
Ark	Released: July 1, 1999; Label: Kioon Music	1	JPN: 2,274,920	RIAJ: Multi-Million
Ray	Released: July 1, 1999; Label: Kioon Music	2	JPN: 2,137,600	RIAJ: Multi-Million
Real	Released: August 30, 2000; Label: Kioon Music	1	JPN: 1,097,760	RIAJ: 3× Platinum
Smile	Released: March 31, 2004; Label: Kioon Music	2	JPN: 378,748; KOR: 10,642	RIAJ: Platinum
Awake	Released: June 22, 2005; Label: Kioon Music	1	JPN: 358,703	RIAJ: Platinum
Kiss	Released: November 21, 2007; Label: Kioon Music	1	JPN: 327,496	RIAJ: Platinum
Butterfly	Released: February 8, 2012; Label: Kioon Music	1	JPN: 235,660; KOR: 1,396	RIAJ: Platinum

=== Repackaged albums ===
Title	Album details	Peak chart positions	Sales/Units	Certifications
Title	Album details	JPN	Sales/Units	Certifications
Dune 10th Anniversary Edition	Released: April 21, 2004; Label: Danger Crue Records	5	JPN: 65,575	
Ark 15th Anniversary Expanded Edition	Released: December 13, 2006; Label: Kioon Music	13	JPN: 40,143	
Ray 15th Anniversary Expanded Edition	Released: December 13, 2006; Label: Kioon Music	12	JPN: 41,561	

=== Live albums ===
Title	Album details	Peak chart positions	Sales/Units	Certifications
Title	Album details	JPN	Sales/Units	Certifications
25th L'Anniversary Live	Released: March 28, 2018; Label: Kioon Music	5		

=== Compilation albums ===
Title	Album details	Peak chart positions		Sales/Units	Certifications
Title	Album details	JPN	KOR	Sales/Units	Certifications
Clicked Singles Best 13	Released: March 14, 2001; Label: Kioon Music	1	—	JPN: 1,241,500; KOR: 12,686	RIAJ: 4× Platinum
The Best of L'Arc-en-Ciel 1994–1998	Released: March 19, 2003; Label: Kioon Music	6	—	JPN: 180,662	RIAJ: Gold
The Best of L'Arc-en-Ciel 1998–2000	Released: March 19, 2003; Label: Kioon Music	4	—	JPN: 193,086	RIAJ: Platinum
The Best of L'Arc-en-Ciel C/W	Released: March 19, 2003; Label: Kioon Music	8	—	JPN: 141,419	RIAJ: Gold
Quadrinity: Member's Best Selections	Released: March 10, 2010; Label: Kioon Music	2	8	JPN: 116,871	RIAJ: Gold
Twenity 1991–1996	Released: February 16, 2011; Label: Kioon Music	12	58	JPN: 16,543	
Twenity 1997–1999	Released: February 16, 2011; Label: Kioon Music	11	59	JPN: 21,114	
Twenity 2000–2010	Released: February 16, 2011; Label: Kioon Music	7	60	JPN: 22,396	
World's Best Selection	Released: March 3, 2012; Label: Kioon Music	8	—	JPN: 18,746	

=== Remix albums ===
Title	Album details	Peak chart positions	Certifications
Title	Album details	JPN	Certifications
Ectomorphed Works	Released: June 28, 2000; Label: Kioon Music	3	RIAJ: Gold

== Singles ==
Title	Year	Peak chart positions	Sales/Units	Certifications	Album
Title	Year	JPN	Sales/Units	Certifications	Album
"Floods of Tears/Yasouka" (Floods of tears/夜想花)	1992	—			Dune
"Blurry Eyes"	1994	12	JPN: 67,580		Tierra
"Vivid Colors"	1995	16	JPN: 132,677	RIAJ: Gold	Heavenly
"Natsu no Yuu-utsu (Time to Say Good-bye)" (夏の憂鬱 [time to say good-bye])	1995	15	JPN: 82,609		Heavenly
"Kaze ni Kienaide" (風にきえないで)	1996	4	JPN: 210,625	RIAJ: Gold	True
"Flower"	1996	5	JPN: 336,090	RIAJ: Platinum	True
"Lies and Truth"	1996	6	JPN: 299,809	RIAJ: Gold	True
"Niji" (虹)	1997	3	JPN: 723,211	RIAJ: Platinum	Heart
"Winter Fall"	1998	1	JPN: 849,835	RIAJ: 2× Platinum	Heart
"Dive to Blue"	1998	1	JPN: 859,035	RIAJ: 2× Platinum	Ark
"Honey"	1998	1	JPN: 1,238,414	RIAJ: 3× Platinum	Ray
"Kasou" (花葬)	1998	4	JPN: 1,049,639	RIAJ: Million	Ray
"Shinshoku ~Lose Control~" (浸食 ～Lose Control～)	1998	2	JPN: 938,401	RIAJ: 2× Platinum	Ray
"Snow Drop"	1998	1	JPN: 1,146,101	RIAJ: 3× Platinum	Ray
"Forbidden Lover"	1998	1	JPN: 838,815	RIAJ: 2× Platinum	Ark
"Heaven's Drive"	1999	1	JPN: 1,123,580	RIAJ: 3× Platinum	Ark
"Pieces"	1999	1	JPN: 734,710	RIAJ: 2× Platinum	Ark
"Driver's High"	1999	2	JPN: 340,480	RIAJ: Platinum	Ark
"Love Flies"	1999	1	JPN: 514,450	RIAJ: Platinum	Real
"Neo Universe/Finale"	2000	1	JPN: 1,103,880	RIAJ: Million	Real
"Stay Away"	2000	2	JPN: 733,660	RIAJ: 2× Platinum	Real
"Spirit Dreams Inside -Another Dream-"	2001	1	JPN: 287,050	RIAJ: Platinum	Smile
"Ready Steady Go"	2004	1	JPN: 310,534	RIAJ: Platinum	Smile
"Hitomi no Juunin" (瞳の住人)	2004	1	JPN: 170,370	RIAJ: Gold	Smile
"Jiyuu e no Shoutai" (自由への招待)	2004	1	JPN: 215,134	RIAJ: Platinum	Awake
"Killing Me"	2005	1	JPN: 193,772	RIAJ: Gold	Awake
"New World"	2005	1	JPN: 183,181	RIAJ: Gold	Awake
"Jojoushi" (叙情詩)	2005	1	JPN: 145,718	RIAJ: Gold	Awake
"Link"	2005	2	JPN: 235,751	RIAJ: Platinum	Kiss
"The Fourth Avenue Café"	2006	5	JPN: 49,916		True
"Seventh Heaven"	2007	1	JPN: 143,769	RIAJ: Gold	Kiss
"My Heart Draws a Dream"	2007	1	JPN: 147,634	RIAJ: Gold	Kiss
"Daybreak's Bell"	2007	1	JPN: 181,306	RIAJ: Gold	Kiss
"Hurry Xmas"	2007	2	JPN: 188,123	RIAJ: Gold	Kiss
"Drink It Down"	2008	1	JPN: 125,728	RIAJ: Gold	Butterfly
"Nexus 4/Shine"	2008	2	JPN: 135,295	RIAJ: Gold	Butterfly
"Bless"	2010	2	JPN: 109,456	RIAJ: Gold	Butterfly
"Good Luck My Way"	2011	4	JPN: 129,658	RIAJ: Gold	Butterfly
"XXX"	2011	1	JPN: 115,001	RIAJ: Gold	Butterfly
"Chase"	2011	2	JPN: 95,647	RIAJ: Gold	Butterfly
"Everlasting"	2014	2	JPN: 57,816		Non-album singles
"Wings Flap"	2015	2	JPN: 58,380		Non-album singles
"Don't be Afraid"	2016	4	JPN: 49,923		Non-album singles
"Mirai"	2021	3	JPN: 38,305		Non-album singles
"Forever"	2021	7	JPN: 18,260		Non-album singles
"You Gotta Run"	2024	5	JPN: 12,000		

=== Limited digital download songs ===
Title	Year	Peak chart positions	Sales/Units	Certifications	Album
Title	Year	JPN	Sales/Units	Certifications	Album
"I Love Rock 'n' Roll"	2010	–			Twenity 2000–2010

== Filmography ==
=== VHS, DVD, and Blu-ray (BD) ===
Title	Album details	Peak chart positions		Sales/Units	Certifications
Title	Album details	JPN DVD	JPN BD	Sales/Units	Certifications
L'Arc-en-Ciel	Released: March 16, 1992; Label: Danger Crue; Format: VHS	—	—		
Touch of Dune	Released: October 21, 1993; Label: Danger Crue; Format: VHS	—	—		
Nemuri ni Yosete (眠りによせて)	Released: July 1, 1994 (VHS); Rereleased: December 17, 2003 (DVD); Label: Kioon Music; Format: VHS, DVD		—		
Siesta～Film of Dreams～	Released: December 1, 1994 (VHS); Rereleased: December 17, 2003 (DVD); Label: Kioon Music; Format: VHS, DVD		—		
And She Said	Released: May 21, 1995 (VHS); Rereleased: December 17, 2003 (DVD); Label: Kioon Music; Format: VHS, DVD		—		
Heavenly ~Films~	Released: March 21, 1996 (VHS); Rereleased: December 17, 2003 (DVD); Rereleased: March 19, 2014 (BD); Label: Kioon Music; Format: VHS, DVD, Blu-ray		76		
A Piece of Reincarnation	Released: April 22, 1998 (VHS); Rereleased: August 11, 1999 (DVD); Label: Kioon Music; Format: VHS, DVD		—		
Heart ni Hi wo Tsukero! (ハートに火をつけろ！)	Released: December 23, 1998 (VHS); Rereleased: August 11, 1999 (DVD); Rereleased: March 19, 2014 (BD); Label: Kioon Music; Format: VHS, DVD, Blu-ray		129		RIAJ: Platinum
Chronicle	Released: August 11, 1999 (VHS); Rereleased: August 11, 1999 (DVD); Label: Kioon Music; Format: VHS, DVD		—		
1999 Grand Cross Conclusion	Released: December 1, 1999 (VHS, DVD); Rereleased: March 19, 2014 (BD); Label: Kioon Music; Format: VHS, DVD, Blu-ray		78		RIAJ: Platinum
Chronicle 2	Released: March 28, 2001; Label: Kioon Music; Format: VHS, DVD		—		
Club Circuit 2000 Realive -No Cut-	Released: June 20, 2001 (VHS, DVD); Rereleased: March 19, 2014 (BD); Label: Kioon Music; Format: VHS, DVD, Blu-ray		148		RIAJ: Gold
7	Released: December 17, 2003 (DVD); Rereleased: March 19, 2014 (BD); Label: Kioon Music; Format: DVD, Blu-ray		216		
Live In U.S.A.～at 1st Mariner Arena July 31, 2004～	Released: December 8, 2004 (DVD); Rereleased: March 19, 2014 (BD); Label: Kioon Music; Format: DVD, Blu-ray		—		
Smile Tour 2004 全国編	Released: June 1, 2005 (DVD); Rereleased: March 19, 2014 (BD); Label: Kioon Music; Format: DVD, Blu-ray	1	247		
Awake Tour 2005	Released: December 14, 2005 (DVD); Rereleased: March 19, 2014 (BD); Label: Kioon Music; Format: DVD, Blu-ray	3	173		
AsiaLive 2005	Released: June 21, 2006 (DVD); Rereleased: March 19, 2014 (BD); Label: Kioon Music; Format: DVD, Blu-ray	11	—		
Chronicle 0 -Zero-	Released: February 14, 2007; Label: Kioon Music; Format: DVD	2	—		
Five Live Archives	Released: April 4, 2007; Label: Kioon Music; Format: DVD	4	—		
15th L’Anniversary Live	Released: September 12, 2007 (DVD); Rereleased: March 19, 2014 (BD); Label: Kioon Music; Format: DVD, Blu-ray	1	63		RIAJ: Gold
Chronicle 3	Released: December 7, 2007; Label: Kioon Music; Format: DVD	3	—		
Are you Ready? 2007 またハートに火をつけろ! in Okinawa	Released: April 2, 2008 (DVD); Rereleased: March 19, 2014 (BD); Label: Kioon Music; Format: DVD, Blu-ray	2	241		
Tour 2007-2008 Theater of Kiss	Released: August 27, 2008 (DVD); Rereleased: March 19, 2014 (BD); Label: Kioon Music; Format: DVD, Blu-ray	1	159		
Chronicle 4	Released: February 25, 2009; Label: Kioon Music; Format: DVD	4	—		
Documentary Films ~Trans Asia via Paris~	Released: March 25, 2009 (DVD); Rereleased: March 19, 2014 (BD); Label: Kioon Music; Format: DVD, Blu-ray	7	—		
Live in Paris	Released: May 20, 2009 (DVD); Rereleased: March 19, 2014 (BD); Label: Kioon Music; Format: DVD, Blu-ray	1	202		
Tour 2008 L’7～Trans Asia via Paris～	Released: March 31, 2010 (DVD); Rereleased: March 19, 2014 (BD); Label: Kioon Music; Format: DVD, Blu-ray	2	134		
Five Live Archives 2	Released: April 6, 2011; Label: Kioon Music; Format: DVD	4	—		
20th L’Anniversary Live Day1	Released: December 28, 2011 (DVD); Rereleased: March 19, 2014 (BD); Label: Kioon Music; Format: DVD, Blu-ray	2	86		
20th L’Anniversary Live Day2	Released: December 28, 2011 (DVD); Rereleased: March 19, 2014 (BD); Label: Kioon Music; Format: DVD, Blu-ray	3	91		
Live Twenity	Released: June 13, 2012; Label: Kioon Music; Format: DVD	2	—		
World Tour 2012 Live at Madison Square Garden	Released: December 26, 2012 (DVD); Rereleased: March 19, 2014 (BD); Label: Kioon Music; Format: DVD, Blu-ray	2	136		
20th L’Anniversary World Tour 2012 - The Final Live at National Stadium	Released: March 20, 2013; Label: Kioon Music; Format: DVD, Blu-ray	4	5		
L’Aive Blu-ray Box-Limited Edition-	Released: February 26, 2014; Label: Kioon Music; Format: Blu-ray	—	12		
L'Arc-en-Ciel Live 2014 at National Stadium	Released: November 12, 2014; Label: Kioon Music; Format: DVD, Blu-ray	2	1		
Documentary Films～World Tour 2012～Over The L’Arc-en-Ciel	Released: April 15, 2015; Label: Kioon Music; Format: DVD, Blu-ray	10	2		
L’Arc～en～Ciel Live 2015 L’ArCASINO	Released: March 1, 2017; Label: Kioon Music; Format: DVD, Blu-ray	4	2		
25th L’Anniversary Live	Released: May 30, 2018; Label: Kioon Music; Format: DVD, Blu-ray	5	1		
Live 2018 L’ArChristmas	Released: December 18, 2019; Label: Kioon Music; Format: DVD, Blu-ray	5	1		
30th L’Anniversary Live	Releases: March 27, 2024; Label: Kioon Music; Format: DVD, Blu-ray				
