= Butterfly (L'Arc-en-Ciel album) =

2012 studio album by L'Arc-en-Ciel

Studio album by L'Arc-en-Ciel
- Released: February 8, 2012
- Recorded: 2007–2011
- Genre: Pop rock
- Length: 46:38
- Label: Ki/oon
- Producer: L'Arc-en-Ciel

L'Arc-en-Ciel chronology
Twenity 2000-2010 (2011)	Butterfly (2012)

Singles from Butterfly
- 1. "Drink It Down" Released: April 02, 2008; 2. "Nexus 4/Shine" Released: August 27, 2008; 3. "Bless" Released: January 27, 2010; 4. "Good Luck My Way" Released: June 29, 2011; 5. "X X X" Released: October 12, 2011; 6. "Chase" Released: December 21, 2011

P'unk Is Not Dead

Studio album by P'unk-en-Ciel
- Released: February 8, 2012
- Genre: Punk rock
- Label: Ki/oon
- Producer: P'unk-en-Ciel

Butterfly is the twelfth album by the Japanese rock band L'Arc-en-Ciel. It was released on February 8, 2012, in two versions: regular and deluxe edition, with the latter including the tracks of the first album by their alter ego band P'unk-en-Ciel, titled P'unk Is Not Dead, and a DVD. The album was released in several European countries, starting on March 5, 2012, with the United Kingdom and finishing on March 17 with Spain and Poland.

The band's first studio album in four years, it includes all six singles (including one double A-side single) released between "Drink It Down" in 2008 and "Chase" in 2011. Butterfly debuted at number one on the Oricon chart, selling over 170,000 copies in its first week. It also debuted at number eight on Gaon Music Chart.

== Butterfly track listing ==
All lyrics are written by hyde, except track 6, lyrics by yukihiro.

Butterfly – standard edition
No.	Title	Music	Length
1.	"Chase"	ken, hyde	4:27
2.	"X X X"	hyde	4:05
3.	"Bye Bye"	tetsuya	3:36
4.	"Good Luck My Way -Butterfly Ver.-"	tetsuya	4:38
5.	"Bless"	hyde	4:57
6.	"Shade of Season"	yukihiro	4:11
7.	"Drink It Down"	yukihiro	4:07
8.	"Wild Flower"	ken	5:22
9.	"Shine"	tetsuya	4:05
10.	"Nexus 4"	tetsuya	3:52
11.	"Mirai Sekai" (未来世界)	ken	3:19

== Punk Is Not Dead track listing ==
All lyrics are written by hyde, except track 11, lyrics by tetsuya.

Butterfly – Deluxe Edition: Punk Is Not Dead
No.	Title	Music	Arrangement	Length
1.	"Natsu no Yuu-utsu [Sea in Blood 2007]" (夏の憂鬱 [SEA IN BLOOD 2007])	ken	HYDE P'UNK	4:08
2.	"Kasou Heisei 17 Nen" (花葬 平成十七年)	ken	HYDE P'UNK	4:34
3.	"Heaven's Drive 2005"	hyde	YUKI P'UNK	3:47
4.	"Round and Round 2005"	hyde	KEN P'UNK	3:34
5.	"Dune 2008"	tetsuya	KEN P'UNK	4:08
6.	"I Wish 2007"	tetsuya	T.E.Z P'UNK	4:19
7.	"Promised Land 2005"	ken	T.E.Z P'UNK	4:31
8.	"Honey 2007"	hyde	KEN P'UNK	3:42
9.	"Feeling Fine 2007"	ken	YUKI P'UNK	3:48
10.	"Route 666 -2010-"	hyde	YUKI P'UNK	3:41
11.	"Milky Way 2004"	tetsuya	HYDE P'UNK	4:14
12.	"Metropolis −2011-"	ken	T.E.Z P'UNK	4:11

== Personnel ==
Butterfly

- hyde – vocals, keyboards on tracks 1, 2 and 5
- ken – guitar, backing vocals, keyboards on tracks 1, 6–8 and 11, tambourine on track 3, vibes on track 5
- tetsuya – bass guitar, backing vocals, keyboards on tracks 3, 4, 9 and 10
- yukihiro – drums, keyboards on tracks 6 and 7, tambourine on 8, grancassa on track 11
- Rie Eto – backing vocals on track 1
- Akira Nishihara – keyboards on tracks 2, 4, 9 and 10
- Hajime Okano – keyboards on track 3, 5, 9 and 10, Q-chord on track 4
- Chieko Kanehara – strings on tracks 2, 4 and 5
- Shiro Sasaki, Teppei Kawakami – trumpet on track 4
- Kanade Shishiuchi – trombone on track 4
- Masato Honda – alto saxophone on track 4
- Takayuki Mogami – oboe on track 5
- Hikoutsu Fujita, Shingi Takahashi – horn on track 5
- Yuji Sugiyama – keyboards on track 7
- Takashi Kusama – keyboards on track 10

P'unk is Not Dead

- T.E.Z P'UNK – vocals
- HYDE P'UNK – guitar
- YUKI P'UNK – bass guitar
- KEN P'UNK – drums

== Charts ==
=== Weekly charts ===
Chart (2012)	Peak position
Japanese Albums (Oricon)	1
Japanese Top Albums Sales (Billboard Japan)	1
South Korean Albums (Gaon)	8

=== Year-end charts ===
Chart (2012)	Position
Japanese Albums (Oricon)	23
Japanese Top Albums Sales (Billboard Japan)	22

== Certifications ==
Region	Certification	Certified units/sales
Japan (RIAJ)	Platinum	250,000^{^}
^{^} Shipments figures based on certification alone.
