= List of Oricon number-one singles of 2005 =

The highest-selling singles in Japan are ranked in the weekly Oricon Singles Chart, which is published by Oricon Style magazine. The data are compiled by Oricon based on each singles' weekly physical sales. This list includes the singles that reached the number one place on that chart in 2005.

== Chart history ==
Issue date	Song	Artist(s)	Ref.
January 3	"Anniversary"	KinKi Kids	
January 17	"Anniversary"	KinKi Kids	
January 24	"Killing Me"	L'Arc-en-Ciel	
January 31	"Tomodachi e (Say What You Will)"	SMAP	
February 7	"Fantastipo"	Toraji Haiji	
February 14	"Fantastipo"	Toraji Haiji	
February 21	"Hatsukoi Ressha"	Kiyoshi Hikawa	
February 28	"Sakura"	Ketsumeishi	
March 7	"Asterisk"	Orange Range	
March 14	"Asterisk"	Orange Range	
March 21	"Ai no Bakudan"	B'z	
March 28	"Cherish"	NEWS	
April 4	"Sakura Sake"	Arashi	
April 11	"Do the Motion"	BoA	
April 18	"New World"	L'Arc-en-Ciel	
April 25	"Bokutachi no Yukue"	Hitomi Takahashi	
May 2	"Step You/Is This Love?"	Ayumi Hamasaki	
May 9	"Step You/Is This Love?"	Ayumi Hamasaki	
May 16	"Kamen/Mirai Kōkai"	Tackey & Tsubasa	
May 23	"Smily/Biidama"	Ai Otsuka	
May 30	"Jojoushi"	L'Arc-en-Ciel	
June 6	"Love Parade"	Orange Range	
June 13	"Love Parade"	Orange Range	
June 20	"Onegai! Señorita"	Orange Range	
June 27	"Veludo no Yami"	KinKi Kids	
July 4	"Utao-Utao"	V6	
July 11	"Yonjigen: Four Dimensions"	Mr. Children	
July 18	"Yonjigen: Four Dimensions"	Mr. Children	
July 25	"Teppen"	NEWS	
August 8	"Bang! Bang! Vacance"	SMAP	
August 15	"Fairyland"	Ayumi Hamasaki	
August 22	"Ocean"	B'z	
August 29	"Vestige"	T.M.Revolution	
September 5	Kizuna"	Orange Range	
September 12	"Glamorous Sky"	Mika Nakashima	
September 19	"Glamorous Sky"	Mika Nakashima	
August 29	"Heaven"	Ayumi Hamasaki	
October 3	"Planetarium"	Ai Otsuka	
October 10	"Be My Last"	Hikaru Utada	
October 17	"Countdown"	Hyde	
October 24	"Orange"	V6	
October 31	"Suki Sugite Baka Mitai"	Def.Diva	
November 7	"Pop Star"	Ken Hirai	
November 14	"Seishun Amigo"	Shūji to Akira	
November 21	"Seishun Amigo"	Shūji to Akira	
November 28	"Wish"	Arashi	
December 5	"Triangle"	SMAP	
December 12	"Bold & Delicious/Pride"	Ayumi Hamasaki	
December 19	"You"	Kumi Koda	
December 26	"Tada...Aitakute"	Exile	
