= List of Oricon number-one singles of 2004 =

The following is a list of Oricon number-one singles of 2004.

== Oricon Weekly Singles Chart ==
Issue date	Song	Artist(s)	Ref.
January 5	No chart data available		
January 12	"Sekai ni Hitotsu Dake no Hana"	SMAP	
January 19	"Star Gazer"	Spitz	
January 26	"Toki no Shizuku"	Glay	
February 2	"READY STEADY GO"	L'arc-en-Ciel	
February 9	"One Day, One Dream"	Tackey & Tsubasa	
February 16	"PIKA☆☆NCHI DOUBLE"	Arashi	
February 23	"Michishirube ~a road home~"	Orange Range	
March 1	"Hitomi no Juunin"	L'arc-en-Ciel	
March 8	"Wonderful Life"	&G	
March 15	"Subete ga Boku no Chikara ni Naru!"	Kuzu	
March 22	"Arigatou no Uta"	V6	
March 29	"Moments"	Ayumi Hamasaki	
April 5	"Moments"	Ayumi Hamasaki	
April 12	"Aja"	Southern All Stars	
April 19	"Dareka no Negai ga Kanau Koro"	Hikaru Utada	
April 26	"Dareka no Negai ga Kanau Koro"	Hikaru Utada	
May 3	"Banzai"	B'z	
May 10	"Kibou: Yell"	NEWS	
May 17	"Tenshi no Wakemae"	Glay	
May 24	"Sign"	Mr. Children	
May 31	"Jiyuu e no Shoutai"	L'arc-en-Ciel	
June 7	"Waver"	Domoto Tsuyoshi	
June 14	"Locolotion"	Orange Range	
June 21	"Locolotion"	Orange Range	
June 28	"Real World"	Exile	
July 5	"Only Lonely Glory"	Bump of Chicken	
July 12	"Wonderland"	Koshi Inaba	
July 19	"Kimi Koso Star da"	Southern All Stars	
July 26	"Inspire"	Ayumi Hamasaki	
August 2	"Blue Jean"	Glay	
August 9	"Akaku Moyuru Taiyou"	NEWS	
August 16	"Hitomi no Naka no Galaxy"	Arashi	
August 23	"Chest"	Orange Range	
August 30	"Arigato"	B'z	
September 6	"Mickey"	Gorie with Jasmine & Joann	
September 13	"Mickey"	Gorie with Jasmine & Joann	
September 20	"Naniwa Iroha Bushi"	Kanjani8	
September 27	"Carols"	Ayumi Hamasaki	
October 4	"Omoi ga Kasanaru Sono Mae ni..."	Ken Hirai	
October 11	"Omoi ga Kasanaru Sono Mae ni..."	Ken Hirai	
October 18	"Hana"	Orange Range	
October 25	"Hana"	Orange Range	
November 1	"Hana"	Orange Range	
November 8	"108.681"	TM Revolution	
November 15	"Hana"	Orange Range	
November 22	"Ai to Yokubou no Hibi"	Southern All Stars	
November 29	"Naitari Shinaide / Red x Bue"	Masaharu Fukuyama	
December 6	"White Road"	Glay	
December 13	"Koibumi / Good Night"	Every Little Thing	
December 20	"Anniversary"	KinKi Kids	
December 27	"Anniversary"	KinKi Kids	
