= Home (B'z song) =

Single by B'z
- Released: July 8, 1998
- Genre: Hard rock; blues-rock
- Label: Rooms
- Songwriter(s): Koshi Inaba; Tak Matsumoto
- Producer(s): Tak Matsumoto

B'z singles chronology
"Samayoeru Aoi Dangan" (1998)	"Home" (1998)	"Giri Giri Chop" (1999)

"Home" is the twenty-fifth single by B'z, released on July 8, 1998. This song is one of B'z many number-one singles on the Oricon weekly chart. Japanese rock band L'Arc-en-Ciel released three singles in the same day. Although L'Arc-en-Ciel's three singles—"Honey", "Shinshoku (Lose Control)" and "Kasō"—passed the first week sales of 500,000 copies each and were ranked at number two, three and four respectively, the single "Home" managed to debut at the number-one position. The single sold over 961,000 copies according to Oricon. While they won "the artist of the year award", the song was elected as one of "songs of the year" at the 13th Japan Gold Disc Award.

== Track listing ==
1. "Home"
2. "The Wild Wind"

== Certifications ==
Region	Certification	Certified units/sales
Japan (RIAJ)	Million	1,000,000^{^}
^{^} Shipments figures based on certification alone.
