= The Best of L'Arc-en-Ciel 1998–2000 =

Greatest hits album by L'Arc-en-Ciel
- Released: March 19, 2003
- Genre: Alternative rock, pop rock
- Label: Ki/oon

L'Arc-en-Ciel chronology
The Best of L'Arc-en-Ciel 1994–1998 (2003)	The Best of L'Arc-en-Ciel; 1998–2000 (2003)	The Best of L'Arc-en-Ciel C/W (2003)

The Best of L'Arc-en-Ciel 1998–2000 is a compilation album released by L'Arc-en-Ciel on March 19, 2003, simultaneously with The Best of L'Arc-en-Ciel 1994–1998 and The Best of L'Arc-en-Ciel C/W. It reached number four on the Oricon Albums Chart and charted for 16 weeks.

== Track listing ==
Track listing for The Best of L'Arc-en-Ciel 1998–2000
#	Title	Lyrics	Music
1	"Dive to Blue"	Hyde	Tetsu
2	"Honey"	Hyde	Hyde
3	"Shinshoku ~Lose Control~" (浸食 ~lose control~, Erosion)	Hyde	Ken
4	"Kasō" (花葬, Flower Burial)	Hyde	Ken
5	"Snow Drop"	Hyde	Tetsu
6	"Forbidden Lover"	Hyde	Ken
7	"Heaven's Drive"	Hyde	Hyde
8	"Pieces"	Hyde	Tetsu
9	"Trick"	Yukihiro	Yukihiro
10	"Driver's High"	Hyde	Tetsu
11	"Love Flies"	Hyde	Ken
12	"Neo Universe"	Hyde	Ken
13	"Finale"	Hyde	Tetsu
14	"Stay Away"	Hyde	Tetsu
15	"Get out from the Shell -Asian Version-"	Hyde	Yukihiro

== Credits ==
- Hyde – vocals
- Ken – guitar, keyboards (on some tracks)
- Tetsu – bass guitar, backing vocals, keyboards (on some tracks)
- Yukihiro – drums

== Charts ==
Weekly chart performance for The Best of L'Arc-en-Ciel 1998–2000
Chart (2003)	Peak position
Japanese Albums (Oricon)	4

== Certifications ==
Certifications for The Best of L'Arc-en-Ciel 1998–2000
Region	Certification	Certified units/sales
Japan (RIAJ)	Platinum	250,000^{^}
^{^} Shipments figures based on certification alone.
