= Fullmetal Alchemist 2: Curse of the Crimson Elixir =

2004 video game

- North American cover art
- Developer: Racjin
- Publisher: Square Enix
- Director: Shigeru Maekawa
- Designers: Shinji Yamashita; Kazuhito Yamashita; Koji Yasumura; Isao Mutou
- Series: Fullmetal Alchemist
- Platform: PlayStation 2
- Release: JP: September 22, 2004; NA: July 12, 2005
- Genre: Action role-playing
- Mode: Single-player

Fullmetal Alchemist 2: Curse of the Crimson Elixir (Note: Japanese: 鋼の錬金術師2〜赤きエリクシルの悪魔〜, Hepburn: Hagane no Renkinjutsushi 2: Akaki Erikushiru no Akuma; Alchemist of Steel 2: Devil of the Red Elixir) is the second role-playing video game for the PlayStation 2 based on the series of the same name. It is the prequel of sorts to Fullmetal Alchemist and the Broken Angel. The game has more improved visuals than the previous title, as well as all dialogue being voiced over.

== Plot ==
Edward and Alphonse arrive in the city of Lior to deal with Father Cornello and ask him about the Philosopher's Stone. However, just as soon as the two brothers defeat him, Father Cornello is pulled into a dark void and disappears. Edward notices a strange phantom-like woman hiding behind the statues watching the scene. Shortly afterwards, after facing off against Bald, investigating Shou Tucker's home, and barely escaping death at Scar's hands, Edward and Alphonse return to Resembool for repairs. Healed, they investigate rumors of monsters appearing at a cave, coming across "monsters"; they come across the Phantom again, badly burning her. An alchemist appears and heals her, without using a transmutation circle; they both vanish.

Reporting this incident to Roy Mustang, he reveals that similar creatures have been appearing all over Amestris; in addition, people have been disappearing. He sends the brothers and Lt. Riza Hawkeye to investigate a recent sighting; they find the village empty, and a bloodstained transmutation circle. Following a howl to a graveyard, they meet archaeologist Arlen Glostner, who is being attacked; after they defeat the monster, the same mysterious alchemist appears again. Arlen identifies the man as Jack Crowley; Crowley then vanishes again, seemingly saddened by the encounter. Arlen reveals he studies the ancient civilization of Lebis, and Crowley was once his friend. Crowley teamed up with Arlen to study the art of creating Golems (the monsters they're battling), hoping it would help revive his lost love, Elma, after failing with alchemy; they succeeded in bringing her back in a Golem body, but she reverted to dirt after a few months. Crowley went mad, bringing Elma back repeatedly against her wishes; Arlen left Crowley, unable to stand what became of his friend.

Arlen leads them to city of Siam-Sid, where Crowley is hiding out. They meet Elma, who tells Arlen it's not his fault for her pain, and that Crowley only keeps bringing her back out of love. When attacked by Golems (who disguised themselves as natives), Ed, Al, Riza, and Arlen are saved by the timely arrival of the military. Infiltrating the Tower of Lebis to find Crowley, the brothers get separated from Mustang, Hawkeye, and Armstrong. Choosing which one to go after, the brothers fight more Golems and come to the conclusion they may have to kill Crowley to put an end to the Golems' terror. Arlen arrives and gets transported away with the brothers to the Queen's Chamber; there, they defeat the Phantom, revealed to be the Golem form of Elma, who Arlen stay behind to mourn.

Ed and Al reach Crowley in the King's Chamber, where they attempt reasoning with him to no avail. In defeat, Crowley draws on the power of the Crimson Stone to become stronger; this reveals he became a Golem himself, to escape his sickly body. Even reduced to sludge, Crowley reanimates as an amorphous creature; Mustang, Hawkeye and Armstrong arrive, taking Crowley's attention away from the Elrics. They rush down the corridor, finding the Crimson Stone; touching it, Ed sees the memories of the King of Lebis and Crowley, who both caused destruction and death out of love. It's revealed that, like Crowley, the King of Lebis lost his Queen and tried to revive her, using Golems. However, the many Golems he created destroyed the city. Another memory of Crowley reveals that, in order to stay with Elma forever, he turned himself in a Golem but left a transmutation circle that could be used to destroy the Golems and himself. Using this transmutation circle Crowley left before going mad, Edward and Alphonse destroy the stone; Crowley and Elma are released from their Golem bodies, while Siam-sid is reduced back to ruins, and all the remaining Golems melt into mud. Arlen elects to remain in the city, having decided to live out his remaining years in the place he spent with his friends. Spectating the events from afar, Homunculi Lust, Envy and Gluttony say they received enough crimson stones from Crowley before he got caught up in bringing back Elma for good.

== Characters ==
- Edward Elric: The Fullmetal Alchemist, his nickname is given because the term "Fullmetal" is used to describe a person who is stubborn. In the series it is often mistakenly attributed by minor characters to Ed's automail arm and leg, or Al's armor body.
- Alphonse Elric: Al is the younger brother of Edward Elric, but is often confused to be older than Ed because he is trapped in a suit of armor twice as large as he is.
- Roy Mustang (non-playable): The Flame Alchemist, a man who specializes in flame alchemy. He is Ed's immediate superior in the military and seems to have his own ambitious objectives unknown to those but his closest confidantes. He is also quite the ladies' man.
- Riza Hawkeye (non-playable): One of Mustang's most trusted confidantes, a severe woman who can remain cool under even the greatest pressure. She is an officer highly capable of accomplishing any designated mission and is an excellent shot with a gun. When out of ammo, she's also good at hand-to-hand combat with knives.
- Maes Hughes (non-playable): One of Mustang's most trusted confidantes, a warm-hearted family man whose favorite thing to do is show off pictures of his young daughter to anyone. He is a skilled knife thrower.
- Alex Louis Armstrong (non-playable, mini-boss): Another member of Mustang's group, a man who can use alchemy to increase the muscular strength of his already extremely well built body.
- Winry Rockbell (non-playable): The childhood friend of Ed and Al, an automail mechanic. She replaces Ed's automail after it is destroyed by Scar. She is also the daughter of two doctors who were murdered by Roy during the Ishbalan conflict. She holds resentment toward Roy but it is speculated that she forgives him to some extent. (In the original manga, Scar is actually the murderer.) However, the events of this game occur before Winry has learned that Colonel Mustang was the one who was ordered to kill her parents by the military; also, she does not particularly act with Mustang during this game.
- Arlen Glostner (アーレン・グロースター, Āren Gurōsutā) (non-playable): An archaeologist who specializes in certain ancient civilizations. He was once friends with Crowley and Elma, and led them to the ruins of Siam-sid. This old codger is stubborn and cranky, but his soul still burns with a fiery passion. And yet he seems to be haunted by shadowy memories of the past...
- Jack Crowley (ジャック・クロウリー, Jakku Krourī) (non-playable): Once nicknamed "The Silver Bullet Alchemist", this former state alchemist was stripped of his certification long ago. He lost his sanity trying to bring Elma back, failing with Human Transmutation, and almost succeeding with use of Golems. He, himself, became a Golem when his human body became too sickly. When he first meets Ed, he remarks that Ed has "the same eyes," but whether this refers to Ed's desire to restore Al or something else isn't clarified.
- Elma (エルマ, Eruma) (non-playable): A beautiful but enigmatic woman who appears to Ed and Al time and time again. She is in fact the strange phantom-like woman and Crowley's lover. He tried to revive her, using the golems of Lebis, like the king before him, but she always turn into mud at the end. After several resurrections, she is in pain and has trouble speaking. The Phantom is her Golem form, over which she has no control (mostly).

== Development ==
To help boost sales, Square Enix decided to release the game with a bonus DVD in the United States containing the second and third episodes of season two (episode 27 "Teacher" and episode 28 "One is All, All is One") of the Fullmetal Alchemist anime series, since the show took a four-month break in its Adult Swim broadcast.

This DVD contains only English audio, with the shortened version of the second opening theme song "Ready Steady Go" by L'Arc-en-Ciel and the shortened third ending "Motherland" by Crystal Kay.

== Reception ==
Reception

Aggregate scores
Aggregator	Score
GameRankings	67%
Metacritic	67/100

Review scores
Publication	Score
1Up.com	C+
GameSpot	7.3/10
GameSpy	3.5/5

As of August 31, 2005, the game has sold 160,000 units in Japan. In his review of the August 2005 Newtype USA Game of the Month Kevin Gifford writes "For Broken Angel veterans, the improvements here will likely be incremental." and that "If there's anything to complain about with Curse, it's the slow buildup."
