= Sayaka Aoki =

Sayaka Aoki may refer to:

- Sayaka Aoki (comedian) (born 1973), Japanese comedian
- Sayaka Aoki (voice actress) (born 1972), Japanese voice actress
- Sayaka Aoki (athlete) (born 1986), Japanese athlete
