= Don't Be Afraid =

Don't Be Afraid may refer to:

- Don't Be Afraid (album), by Information Society, 1997
- Don't Be Afraid (film), a 2011 Spanish film
- Don't Be Afraid, a 1999 novel by Malorie Blackman
- Don't Be Afraid, an organisation representing Catholic Church sexual abuse victims in Poland

== Songs ==
- "Don't Be Afraid" (Aaron Hall song), 1992
- "Don't Be Afraid", by Boston from Don't Look Back, 1978
- "Don't Be Afraid", by the Carpenters from Ticket to Ride, 1969
- "Don't Be Afraid", by Danzig from Blackacidevil, 2000 reissue
- "Don't Be Afraid", by Diplo and Damian Lazarus featuring Jungle, 2021
- "Don't Be Afraid", by L'Arc-en-Ciel, 2016
- "Don't Be Afraid", by the Spooks, 2003
- "Don't Be Afraid", by Stereomud from Perfect Self, 2001
- "Don't Be Afraid", by TKA, 1988
- "Don't Be Afraid", from the musical Happy End, 1929
- "Don't Be Afraid", from the TV series Shining Time Station, 1989
