= Drink It Down =

Drink It Down is a traditional American drinking song found in many variants. The drink varies from stanza to stanza but the common refrain is "Drink it down ! Drink it down !"

In Charles Samuel Elliot's 1870 collection of Yale College songs the refrain goes:

Here's to good old Yale,
drink it down, drink it down, ...

In the version cited by Jack London in The Strange Experience of a Misogynist the refrain goes:

"Here's to the good old whiskey,
For it makes you feel so frisky,
Drink it down ! Drink it down ! Drink it down !""

Elements of the traditional song were used in "Drink It Down", a 1936 song by Ralph Rainger and Leo Robin, first sung in the film Rhythm on the Range (1936) by Leonid Kinskey and Bing Crosby, accompanied by Bob Burns.

== See also ==
- "Drink It Down", a 2008 Japanese-language song by L'Arc-en-Ciel
- "Drink It Down", a song by Diesel Boy on the 1999 album Sofa King Cool
- "Drink It Down, Lady", a 1980 country song by Rex Allen, Jr.
