= Ectomorphed Works =

Remix album by L'Arc-en-Ciel
- Released: June 28, 2000
- Genre: Industrial rock; EBM
- Length: 64:21
- Label: Ki/oon
- Producer: Yukihiro

L'Arc-en-Ciel chronology
| Ray (1999) | Ectomorphed Works (2000) | Real (2000) |

Ectomorphed Works is a remix album released by L'Arc-en-Ciel on June 28, 2000. All mixes were created by the band's drummer, Yukihiro.

== Track listing ==
| No. | Title | Lyrics | Music | Length |
|---|---|---|---|---|
| 1. | "Larva -Ectomorphed Long Mix-" | | Yukihiro | 7:44 |
| 2. | "Trick -New² Wave of Japanese Heavy Metal Mix-" | Yukihiro | Yukihiro | 4:48 |
| 3. | "Kasou -0628 Mix-" (花葬 -0628 Mix-) | Hyde | Ken | 5:09 |
| 4. | "Fate -Everybody Knows But God Mix-" | Hyde | Ken | 6:27 |
| 5. | "Shinshoku" ~Lose Control~ -Ectoborn Mix-" (浸食 ~lose control~ -Ectoborn Mix-) | Hyde | Ken | 5:59 |
| 6. | "A Swell in the Sun -System in Chaos Mix-" | Hyde | Yukihiro | 4:39 |
| 7. | "L'Heure -Quiet Afternoon Mix-" | Yukihiro | Yukihiro | 5:09 |
| 8. | "Cradle -Down to the Moon Mix-" | Hyde | Yukihiro | 7:21 |
| 9. | "Shinjitsu to Gensou To -Out of the Reality Mix #2-" (真実と幻想と-Out of the Reality Mix #2-) | Hyde | Ken | 7:04 |
| 10. | "Metropolis -Android Goes to Be a Deep Sleep Mix-" | Hyde | Ken | 9:59 |

== Charts ==
=== Weekly charts ===
| Chart (2000) | Peak position |
|---|---|
| Japanese Albums (Oricon) | 3 |

=== Year-end charts ===
| Chart (2000) | Position |
|---|---|
| Japanese Albums (Oricon) | 89 |

== Certifications ==
| Region | Certification | Certified units/sales |
|---|---|---|
| Japan (RIAJ) | Gold | 200,000^{^} |
^{^} Shipments figures based on certification alone.

== Personnel ==
- Hyde – vocals
- Ken – guitar
- Tetsu – bass guitar, backing vocals
- Yukihiro – drums
