= X X X (L'Arc-en-Ciel song) =

Single by L'Arc-en-Ciel

from the album Butterfly
- B-side: "I'm so Happy -L'Acoustic version-"
- Released: October 12, 2011
- Genre: Alternative rock
- Length: 17:34
- Label: Ki/oon
- Songwriter(s): hyde
- Producer(s): L'Arc-en-Ciel

L'Arc-en-Ciel singles chronology
"Good Luck My Way" (2011)	"'X X X'" (2011)	"Chase" (2011)

"X X X" (Kiss Kiss Kiss) is the thirty-ninth single by L'Arc-en-Ciel, released on October 12, 2011. The single debuted at number one on the Oricon chart and remained for over a week, selling 81,414 copies. The band had not reached the top of the Oricon chart since the release of "Drink It Down" in 2008.

This single also included the first of a new group of B-Sides, the L'Acoustic versions, after the earliest release, "Good Luck My Way", ended with the introduction of the alter-ego band P'unk-en-Ciel.

== Track listing ==
All lyrics are written by Hyde.

Disc one
No.	Title	Music	Length
1.	"X X X"	hyde	4:07
2.	"I'm so Happy -L'Acoustic version-"	hyde	4:41
3.	"X X X (Hydeless version)"	hyde	4:08
4.	"I'm so Happy -L'Acoustic version- (Hydeless version)"	hyde	4:37
