= Tofu Records =

American record label

- Parent company: Sony Music (US/JP)
- Founded: 2003
- Founder: Yaz Noya
- Defunct: 2007
- Distributor(s): Sony Music
- Genre: Various: mostly pop and rock
- Country of origin: US
- Location: Santa Monica, California

Tofu Records (東風レコード, Tofu Rekodo) was a US record label of Sony Music Entertainment Japan that was launched in 2003 to distribute Japanese Sony artists in the United States until its closure in 2007. Their first signed artist was T.M.Revolution, and they used the anime fandom community to spread the word. T.M.Revolution's U.S. concert debut at Otakon 2003 was successful, drawing an audience of over 5,000.

Tofu Records' second signing was with L'Arc-en-Ciel. The label kicked off publicity for the group with a concert at 1st Mariner Arena in Baltimore, Maryland during Otakon 2004. L'Arc-en-Ciel made 1st Mariner Arena history by being the first music group from Japan to headline there. The concert drew an estimated 12,000. In 2006, Tofu Records also published the Splurge album by pop rock duo PUFFY. They also represented Nami Tamaki, High and Mighty Color, ZONE, Miss Monday, Rhymester, Soulhead and Polysics.

In March 2007, Tofu Records closed. Releases on Sony Music Japan now appear on Columbia or Epic Records through a new deal.

== Releases ==
All releases listed at discogs.com.

Artist	Title	Catalog #	Year	Notes
Boom Boom Satellites	Epk	BBSEPK-9	2005	DVD
Various Artists	Jpop CD	TOF-001	2003	
T.M. Revolution	Coordinate	TOF-002	2003	
Nami Tamaki	Greeting	TOF-007	2004	
L'Arc-en-Ciel	Smile	TOF-010	2004	
L'Arc-en-Ciel	Clicked Singles Best 13	TOF-011	2004	rerelease of Japanese album
Various Artists	Japan for Sale Vol. 4	TOF-014	2004	
Polysics	Polysics or Die!!	TOF-015	2004	
Various Artists	Appleseed Original Soundtrack	TOF-016	2004	2-CD set
Polysics	8-Track CD Sampler + Bonus CD Extra	TOF-018	2005	
T.M. Revolution	Vertical Infinity	TOF-019	2005	
L'Arc-en-Ciel	Awake	TOF-021	2005	
Asian Kung-Fu Generation	Sol-Fa	TOF-022	2005	includes DVD
Polysics	Now Is the Time!	TOF-024	2006	
Boom Boom Satellites	Full of Elevating Pleasures	TOF-026	2005, 2006	three versions with same catalog #
Hyde	Faith	TOF-029	2006	includes DVD
Hitoshi Sakamoto	Final Fantasy XII Original Soundtrack	TOFU 033	2006	2-CD set

== See also ==
- List of record labels
