= Smile (L'Arc-en-Ciel album) =

Studio album by L'Arc-en-Ciel
- Released: March 31, 2004 (JP); June 26, 2004 (US)
- Genres: Alternative rock; pop rock
- Length: 44:42
- Labels: Ki/oon (JP); Tofu (US)
- Producers: L'Arc-en-Ciel; Hajime Okano

L'Arc-en-Ciel chronology
The Best of L'Arc-en-Ciel C/W (2003)	Smile (2004)	Awake (2005)

Singles from Smile
- 1. "Spirit Dreams Inside" Released: September 5, 2001; 2. "Ready Steady Go" Released: February 4, 2004; 3. "Hitomi no Juunin" Released: March 3, 2004

Smile is the ninth album by L'Arc-en-Ciel, released on March 31, 2004. It was the band's first original studio album after a prolonged hiatus. Smile was later given a United States release by Tofu Records, for which all Japanese song titles received English translations in the liner notes. The song "Ready Steady Go" was used as the second opening for the Fullmetal Alchemist anime.

== Track listing ==
All lyrics are written by hyde, except track 3 by ken; track 5 by tetsu.

No.	Title	Music	Length
1.	"Kuchizuke" (接吻 Kiss)	ken	4:25
2.	"Ready Steady Go"	tetsu	3:45
3.	"Lover Boy"	ken	4:45
4.	"Feeling Fine"	ken	4:17
5.	"Time Goes On"	tetsu	4:44
6.	"Coming Closer"	ken	5:14
7.	"Eien" (永遠 Forever)	hyde	4:39
8.	"Revelation"	yukihiro	3:18
9.	"Hitomi no Jūnin" (瞳の住人 Living in Your Eyes)	tetsu	5:55
10.	"Spirit Dreams Inside"	hyde	3:47
11.	"Ready Steady Go (hydeless Version)" (US release only)	tetsu	3:47

== Personnel ==
- hyde – vocals, acoustic guitar on track 10
- ken – guitar, backing vocals, keyboards on tracks 1, 2, 4, 5, 6, 7, 9 and 10, lap steel guitar on track 10
- tetsu – bass guitar, backing vocals, keyboards on tracks 2, 5 and 9, guitar solo on track 5
- yukihiro – drums, percussion, backing vocals, metal percussion on track 3
- Hajime Okano – keyboards on tracks 2, 4, 5, 9 and 10, backing vocals on track 8
- Hiroaki Sugawara – keyboards on track 6, synthesizer on track 10
- Asuka Kaneko – strings on track 6
- Jack Danger – backing vocals on track 8
- Hal-Oh Togashi – acoustic piano on track 9

== Charts ==
=== Weekly charts ===
Chart (2004)	Peak position
Japanese Albums (Oricon)	2

=== Year-end charts ===
Chart (2004)	Position
Japanese Albums (Oricon)	35

== Certifications ==
Region	Certification	Certified units/sales
Japan (RIAJ)	Platinum	250,000^{^}
^{^} Shipments figures based on certification alone.
