= True (L'Arc-en-Ciel album) =

Studio album by L'Arc-en-Ciel
- Released: December 12, 1996
- Genre: Alternative rock; pop rock
- Length: 49:40
- Label: Ki/oon
- Producer: L'Arc-en-Ciel; Hajime Okano; Harunama Togashi; Takeshi Hadano; Takao Konishi; Akira Nishidaira

L'Arc-en-Ciel chronology
Heavenly (1995)	True (1996)	Heart (1998)

Singles from True
- 1. "Kaze ni Kienaide" Released: July 08, 1996; 2. "Flower" Released: October 17, 1996; 3. "Lies and Truth" Released: November 21, 1996; 4. "The Fourth Avenue Cafe" Released: August 30, 2006

True is the fourth album by L'Arc-en-Ciel, released on December 12, 1996. It was the band's last record with sakura on drums. It reached number one on the Oricon chart and sold over a million copies, being certified by the RIAJ. It was also named one of the top albums from 1989 to 1998 in a 2004 issue of the music magazine Band Yarouze.

== Track listing ==
All lyrics are written by hyde, except track 5 by sakura.

No.	Title	Music	Length
1.	"Fare Well"	ken	4:57
2.	"Caress of Venus"	ken	4:25
3.	"Round and Round"	hyde	3:25
4.	"Flower"	hyde	4:58
5.	"Good-Morning Hide"	hyde	5:02
6.	"The Fourth Avenue Cafe"	ken	5:03
7.	"Lies and Truth ("True" Mix)"	ken	5:52
8.	"Kaze ni Kienaide ("True" Mix)" (風にきえないで)	tetsu	4:37
9.	"I Wish"	tetsu	4:35
10.	"Dearest Love"	tetsu	6:47

== Personnel ==
- hyde – vocals, backing vocals, harmonica on track 4, handclaps on track 9
- ken – guitar, backing vocals, vibraphone on track 2, tambourine on track 5, handclaps on track 9
- tetsu – bass guitar, backing vocals, handclaps on track 9
- sakura – drums, backing vocals, handclaps on track 9
- Asuka Kaneko – violin on tracks 1 and 10, strings on track 7
- Shinobu Hashimoto – cello on tracks 1 and 10
- Take – tambourine on tracks 3 and 6
- Shinri Sasaki – female chorus on track 4
- Kimiyoshi Nagoya (Tokyo Ska Paradise Orchestra) – trumpet on track 6
- Masahiko Kitahara (Tokyo Ska Paradise Orchestra) – trombone on track 6
- Tatsuyuki Hiyamuta (Tokyo Ska Paradise Orchestra) – alto saxophone on track 6
- Gamou (Tokyo Ska Paradise Orchestra) – tenor saxophone on track 6
- Atsushi Yanaka (Tokyo Ska Paradise Orchestra) – baritone saxophone on track 6
- Yasushi Nakanishi – piano, organ on track 9
- Jake H. Concepcion – alto sax, clarinet on track 9
- Susumu Kazuhara – trumpet on track 9
- Kiyoshi Okatarou – trombone on track 9
- Hirofumi Kinjou – tenor sax on track 9
- Yusaku, Reiko, Nozomi, Yukari, Toshiyuki – children chorus on track 9
- Takako Ogawa – female chorus on track 10

== Charts ==
=== Weekly charts ===
Chart (1997)	Peak position
Japanese Albums (Oricon)	1

=== Year-end charts ===
Chart (1997)	Position
Japanese Albums (Oricon)	18

Chart (1998)	Position
Japanese Albums (Oricon)	87

== Certifications ==
Region	Certification	Certified units/sales
Japan (RIAJ)	4× Platinum	1,600,000^{^}
^{^} Shipments figures based on certification alone.
