= The Fourth Avenue Cafe =

Single by L'Arc-en-Ciel

from the album True
- Released: August 30, 2006
- Genre: Pop rock
- Length: 5:03
- Label: Ki/oon Records
- Songwriter(s): Hyde, Ken
- Producer(s): L'Arc-en-Ciel

L'Arc-en-Ciel singles chronology
"Link" (2005)	"The Fourth Avenue Cafe" (2006)	"Seventh Heaven" (2007)

"The Fourth Avenue Cafe" is the thirtieth single by L'Arc-en-Ciel. Originally expected on March 21, 1997, but due to drug charges against drummer Sakura it was only finally released on August 30, 2006. The single reached number 5 on the Oricon chart. Back in 1997, it was used as the 4th ending theme to the popular Rurouni Kenshin anime series but was removed after a few episodes (for the same reasons listed above) and replaced with the previous ending song "Heart of Sword" by T.M. Revolution. As a result, the song does not appear on any officially released soundtracks for the series.

== Track listing ==
#	Title	Length	Lyrics	Music
1	"The Fourth Avenue Cafe"	5:03	Hyde	Ken
2	"D'ark-en-Ciel"	‐	‐	‐
2-1	"Dark Song"	0:00-1:15	‐	Hyde
2-3	"D･A･R･K ~Dark in My Life~"	1:16-2:53	Hyde	Hyde
2-4	"Accident"	2:54-3:01	‐	Hyde
2-4	"Insanity"	3:02-4:36	Tetsu	Hyde
2-5	"From Hell" (Hidden Track)	16:13-16:52		

== Chart positions ==
Chart (2006)	Peak position
Japan Oricon	5
