= Seventh Heaven (L'Arc-en-Ciel song) =

Single by L'Arc-en-Ciel

from the album Kiss
- Released: May 30, 2007
- Genre: Alternative rock
- Length: 5:02
- Label: Ki/oon Records
- Songwriter(s): Hyde
- Producer(s): L'Arc-en-Ciel

L'Arc-en-Ciel singles chronology
"The Fourth Avenue Cafe" (2006)	"Seventh Heaven" (2007)	"My Heart Draws a Dream" (2007)

"Seventh Heaven" is a song by L'Arc-en-Ciel, released as a single on May 30, 2007. It reached number one on the Oricon chart. The b-side "Honey 2007" is a rewritten version of their eleventh single "Honey", and is the sixth appearance of their alter ego, P'unk-en-Ciel. The single's music video was nominated for the MTV Video Music Award Japan for Best Rock Video in 2008.

== Track listing ==
#	Title	Lyrics	Music
1	"Seventh Heaven"	Hyde	Hyde
2	"Honey 2007"	Hyde	Hyde
3	"Seventh Heaven (Hydeless version)"	‐	Hyde
4	"Honey 2007 (Tetsu P'unkless version)"	‐	Hyde
