= Kiss (L'Arc-en-Ciel album) =

Studio album by L'Arc-en-Ciel
- Released: November 21, 2007
- Genres: Pop rock; alternative rock
- Length: 53:07
- Label: Ki/oon
- Producers: L'Arc-en-Ciel, Hajime Okano, Akira Nishidaira

L'Arc-en-Ciel chronology
Awake (2005)	Kiss (2007)	Quadrinity: Member's Best Selections (2010)

Singles from Kiss
- 1. "Link" Released: July 20, 2005; 2. "Seventh Heaven" Released: May 30, 2007; 3. "My Heart Draws a Dream" Released: August 29, 2007; 4. "Daybreak's Bell" Released: October 10, 2007; 5. "Hurry Xmas" Released: November 14, 2007

Kiss is the eleventh album by L'Arc-en-Ciel, released on November 21, 2007. Its first-press edition had a 23-page photobook and sold out in less than a week. The album reached No. 1 on the Oricon album chart. The song Daybreak's Bell was used as the first opening song for the Gundam 00 series.

== Track listing ==
No.	Title	Lyrics	Music	Length
1.	"Seventh Heaven"	hyde	hyde	5:01
2.	"Pretty Girl"	ken	ken	3:17
3.	"My Heart Draws a Dream"	hyde	ken	4:16
4.	"Sunadokei" (砂時計)	tetsu	tetsu	4:35
5.	"Spiral"	yukihiro	yukihiro	4:01
6.	"Alone en la Vida"	hyde	ken	5:12
7.	"Daybreak's Bell"	hyde	ken	4:11
8.	"Umibe" (海辺)	hyde	tetsu	4:33
9.	"The Black Rose"	hyde	hyde	3:38
10.	"Link -Kiss Mix-"	hyde	tetsu	4:46
11.	"Yuki no Ashiato" (雪の足跡)	hyde	ken	4:47
12.	"Hurry Xmas"	hyde	hyde	4:49

== Personnel ==
- hyde – vocals, keyboards on track 12
- ken – guitar, backing vocals, keyboards on tracks 1–3, 5-9 and 11, tambourine on track 2
- tetsu – bass guitar, backing vocals, keyboards on tracks 4, 8 and 10, handclap on track 10
- yukihiro – drums, metal percussion on track 2
- Akira Nishidaira – keyboards on tracks 1, 4, 10, handclap on track 10
- Hajime Okano – keyboards on track 2, handclap on track 10, tambourine on track 12
- Toshihiko Komura – saxophone on track 2
- Harunam Togashi – keyboards on tracks 3, 11, acoustic piano on track 3, 7, 11
- Chieko Kanehara – strings on tracks 10 and 12
- Jeremy Lubbock – conductor on track 6
- Bruce Dukov, Becky Bunnell, Darius Campo, Pip Clarke, Charles Everett, Armen Garabedian, Pat Johnson, Peter Kent, Miran Kojian, Dennis Molchan, Anatoly Rosinski, Haim Shtrum, Mari Tsumura, Shari Zippert – violin on track 6
- Marilyn Baker, Dennyse Buffum, Pam Goldsmith, Jimbo Ross – viola on track 6
- Larry Corbett, Ernie Ehrhardt, Vanessa Freebairn-Smith, Suzie Katayama, Steve Richards, Dan Smith – cello on track 6
- Masahiro Kobayashi – trumpet on tracks 9 and 12
- Ta Kobayashi, Isao Sakuma, Mikio Saitou – trumpet on tracks 9
- Hikoutsu Fujita, Yuji Uesato – horn on track 9
- Kiyoshi Satou – tuba on track 9
- Takeshi Hatano – keyboards on track 12
- Masahiko Sugasasa – trumpet on track 12
- Youichi Murata, Masanori Hirohara – trombone
- Kazuhiko Kondou – alto saxophone and flute on track 12
- Ooji Miyamoto – tenor saxophone on track 12
- Yoshiaki Satou – accordion on track 12

== Charts ==
=== Weekly charts ===
Chart (2007)	Peak position
Japanese Albums (Oricon)	1

=== Year-end charts ===
Chart (2007)	Position
Japanese Albums (Oricon)	39

== Certifications ==
Region	Certification	Certified units/sales
Japan (RIAJ)	Platinum	250,000^{^}
^{^} Shipments figures based on certification alone.
