= Spirit Dreams Inside (Another Dream) =

"Spirit Dreams Inside -Another Dream-"

Single by L'Arc-en-Ciel

from the album Smile
- Released: September 5, 2001
- Genre: Alternative rock
- Label: Ki/oon Records
- Songwriter(s): Hyde
- Producer(s): L'Arc-en-Ciel, Hajime Okano

L'Arc-en-Ciel singles chronology
"Stay Away" (2000)	"Spirit Dreams Inside -Another Dream-" (2001)	"Ready Steady Go" (2004)

"Spirit Dreams Inside -Another Dream-" is the twenty-second single by L'Arc-en-Ciel, released on September 5, 2001. It was their first single of the 21st century and their last single until "Ready Steady Go" in 2004. The song debuted at number 1 on the Oricon chart and sold over 201,000 copies in its first week.

The single contains an English language b-side, "Spirit Dreams Inside", which was played during the credits of the film Final Fantasy: The Spirits Within. As well as appearing on the film's soundtrack, Spirit Dreams Inside was also featured on L'Arc-en-Ciel's 2004 album Smile.

== Track listing ==
#	Title	Lyrics	Music
1	"Spirit Dreams Inside -Another Dream-"	Hyde	Hyde
2	"Spirit Dreams Inside"	Hyde	Hyde

== Personnel ==
- Hyde – vocals, acoustic guitar
- Ken – guitar, backing vocals, keyboards, lap steel guitar
- Tetsu – bass guitar, backing vocals
- Yukihiro – drums, percussion, backing vocals
- Hajime Okano – keyboards
- Hiroaki Sugawara – synthesizer
- Hal-Oh Togashi – acoustic piano
