= Killing Me (L'Arc-en-Ciel song) =

Single by L'Arc-en-Ciel

from the album Awake
- Released: January 13, 2005
- Genre: Alternative rock
- Label: Ki/oon Records
- Songwriter: Hyde
- Producers: L'Arc-en-Ciel, Hajime Okano

L'Arc-en-Ciel singles chronology
"Jiyuu e no Shoutai" (2004)	"Killing Me" (2005)	"New World" (2005)

"Killing Me" is the twenty-sixth single by L'Arc-en-Ciel, released on January 13, 2005. It debuted at number 1 on the Oricon chart, and was certified Gold by RIAJ for shipment of 100,000 copies. The single aroused public notice because they collaborated with Sayaka Aoki on the B-side song, "Round and Round 2005" (the second appearance by their alter ego, P'unk-en-Ciel).

== Track listing ==
#	Title	Lyrics	Music
1	"Killing Me"	Hyde	Hyde
2	"Round and Round 2005"	Hyde	Hyde
3	"Round and Round 2005 feat.P'unk Aoki"	Hyde	Hyde
4	"Killing Me (Hydeless version)"	‐	Hyde
5	"Round and Round 2005 (Tetsu P'unkless version)"	‐	Hyde
