= My Heart Draws a Dream =

Single by L'Arc-en-Ciel

from the album Kiss
- Released: August 29, 2007
- Genre: Alternative rock
- Length: 4:18
- Label: Ki/oon Records
- Songwriters: Hyde, Ken

L'Arc-en-Ciel singles chronology
"Seventh Heaven" (2007)	"My Heart Draws a Dream" (2007)	"Daybreak's Bell" (2007)

"My Heart Draws a Dream" is the thirty-second single by L'Arc-en-Ciel, released on August 29, 2007. It reached number 1 on the Oricon chart.

== Track listing ==
#	Title	Lyrics	Music
1	"My Heart Draws a Dream"	Hyde	Ken
2	"Feeling Fine 2007"	Hyde	Ken
3	"My Heart Draws a Dream (Hydeless version)"	‐	Ken
4	"Feeling Fine 2007 (Tetsu P'unkless version)"	‐	Ken

== Sales ==
=== Oricon sales chart (Japan) ===
Release	Chart	Peak position	Sales total
August 29, 2007	Oricon Daily Singles Chart	1	
August 29, 2007	Oricon Weekly Singles Chart	1	128,664
