= Hurry Xmas =

- 2007 Regular edition cover

Single by L'Arc-en-Ciel

from the album Kiss
- B-side: "I Wish 2007"
- Released: November 14, 2007 (1st); November 26, 2008 (2nd); December 9, 2009 (3rd); November 24, 2010 (4th)
- Genre: Pop rock, punk rock
- Length: 22:55
- Label: Ki/oon
- Songwriter: Hyde

L'Arc-en-Ciel singles chronology
"Daybreak's Bell" (2007)	"Hurry Xmas" (2007)	"Drink It Down" (2008)

Alternative cover
- 2007 Special edition cover

"Hurry Xmas" is the thirty-fourth single by L'Arc-en-Ciel, released on November 14, 2007. There are two editions of the original single, a regular and a special edition. The special edition was packaged in a gift box, includes a DVD with two music videos for the A-side and B-side, a photograph of the band, and a Christmas ornament.

It was also re-released on November 26, 2008, and again on December 9, 2009. The 2009 special edition was packaged in a gift box, included a DVD with two live videos for the A-side and B-side, a new photograph of the band, and a new Christmas ornament. The single was re-released again on November 24, 2010.

The 2007 original release reached number 2 on the Oricon chart. The 2008, 2009 and 2010 re-releases reached number 8, 5, and 19 respectively.

== Track listing ==
All lyrics are written by Hyde.

Disc one
No.	Title	Music	Length
1.	"Hurry Xmas"	Hyde	4:50
2.	"I Wish 2007" (P'unk-en-Ciel)	Tetsu	4:19
3.	"Hurry Xmas (Silent Night version)"	Hyde	4:41
4.	"Hurry Xmas (Hydeless version)"	Hyde	4:50
5.	"I Wish 2007 (Tetsu P'unkless version)" (P'unk-en-Ciel)	Tetsu	4:18

Disc two (2007 and 2008 limited editions DVD)
No.	Title	Music	Length
1.	"Hurry Xmas (Music clip)"	Hyde	4:50
2.	"I Wish 2007 (Music clip)" (P'unk-en-Ciel)	Tetsu	4:19

Disc two (2009 and 2010 limited editions only DVD)
No.	Title	Music	Length
1.	"Hurry Xmas (Live)"	Hyde
2.	"I Wish 2007 (Live)" (P'unk-en-Ciel)	Tetsu
