= Ray (L'Arc-en-Ciel album) =

Studio album by L'Arc-en-Ciel
- Released: July 1, 1999
- Genre: Pop rock; alternative rock
- Length: 49:24
- Label: Ki/oon
- Producer: L'Arc-en-Ciel, Hajime Okano

L'Arc-en-Ciel chronology
Ark (1999)	Ray (1999)	Ectomorphed Works (2000)

Singles from Ray
- 1. "Honey" Released: July 8, 1998; 2. "Kasou" Released: July 8, 1998; 3. "Shinshoku (Lose Control)" Released: July 8, 1998; 4. "Snow Drop" Released: October 7, 1998

Ray is the seventh album by L'Arc-en-Ciel, released on July 1, 1999, simultaneously with Ark. It reached number two on the Oricon chart, behind only Ark, and sold over two million copies, being certified by the RIAJ.

== Track listing ==
No.	Title	Music	Length
1.	"Shi no Hai" (死の灰)	tetsu	4:08
2.	"It's the End"	ken	3:25
3.	"Honey"	hyde	3:48
4.	"Sell my Soul"	hyde	4:39
5.	"Snow Drop (Ray Mix)"	tetsu	4:33
6.	"L'heure"	yukihiro	4:04
7.	"Kasou" (花葬)	ken	5:13
8.	"Shinshoku ~Lose Control~" (浸食 ～lose control～)	ken	4:45
9.	"Trick"	yukihiro	3:47
10.	"Ibara no Namida" (いばらの涙)	hyde	5:22
11.	"The Silver Shining"	ken	5:40

== Covers ==
"Shinshoku ~lose control~" was covered by Fantôme Iris, a fictional visual kei band from multimedia franchise Argonavis from BanG Dream! on their first solo live Fantôme Iris 1st LIVE -C'est la vie!-. "Honey" and "Snow Drop" were covered by Eric Martin and Boyz II Men, respectively, on L'Arc-en-Ciel Tribute; a different mix of Martin's cover was later included on his cover album Mr. Rock Vocalist.

== Personnel ==
- hyde – vocals
- ken – guitar, chromaharp on track 1, keyboards on tracks 2, 7, 8 and 11, tambourine on tracks 3, 5 and 11
- tetsu – bass guitar, backing vocals
- yukihiro – drums, tambourine and shaker on track 2, guitar and keyboards on track 9
- Hajime Okano – keyboards on tracks 1, 2, 4, 5, 7, 8, 10, 11
- Hitoshi Saitou – keyboards on tracks 1, 2, 4, 5, 6, 7, 8, 10, 11
- Shinri Sasaki – piano on track 4
- Sylvie – fills on track 6

== Charts ==
=== Weekly charts ===
Original release

Chart (1999)	Peak position
Japanese Albums (Oricon)	2

15th Anniversary Edition

Chart (2006)	Peak position
Japanese Albums (Oricon)	12

=== Year-end charts ===
Chart (1999)	Position
Japanese Albums (Oricon)	7

== Certifications ==
Region	Certification	Certified units/sales
Japan (RIAJ)	2× Million	2,000,000^{^}
^{^} Shipments figures based on certification alone.
