= Hitomi no Juunin =

Single by L'Arc-en-Ciel

from the album Smile
- Released: March 3, 2004
- Genre: Pop rock, power ballad
- Label: Ki/oon Records
- Songwriter(s): Hyde, Tetsu
- Producer(s): L'Arc-en-Ciel, Hajime Okano

L'Arc-en-Ciel singles chronology
"Ready Steady Go" (2004)	"Hitomi no Juunin" (2004)	"Jiyuu e no Shoutai" (2004)

"Hitomi no Juunin" (瞳の住人, Hitomi no Jūnin; Living in Your Eyes) is the twenty-fourth single by L'Arc-en-Ciel, released on March 3, 2004. It reached the number-one position and charted for 10 weeks on the Oricon chart. The single was certified Gold by RIAJ for shipment of 100,000 copies.

== Track listing ==
#	Title	Lyrics	Music
1	"Hitomi no Jyuunin"	Hyde	Tetsu
2	"Hitomi no Jyuunin (Hydeless Version)"	‐	Tetsu
3	"Ready Steady Go (Ken Ready)"	Hyde	Tetsu
4	"Ready Steady Go (Tetsu Ready)"	Hyde	Tetsu
5	"Ready Steady Go (Yukihiro Ready)"	Hyde	Tetsu
