= Daybreak's Bell =

Single by L'Arc-en-Ciel

from the album Kiss
- Released: October 10, 2007
- Genre: Alternative rock
- Length: 16:43
- Label: Ki/oon Records
- Songwriter(s): Hyde, Ken
- Producer(s): L'Arc-en-Ciel

L'Arc-en-Ciel singles chronology
"My Heart Draws a Dream" (2007)	"Daybreak's Bell" (2007)	"Hurry Xmas" (2007)

"Daybreak's Bell" is the thirty-third single by L'Arc-en-Ciel, released on October 10, 2007. It also has a P'unk-en-Ciel track, "Natsu no Yuutsu [Sea in Blood 2007]", a remake of their fourth single "Natsu no Yuu-utsu [Time to say Good-bye]". It debuted at number 1 in the Oricon singles sales chart.

This song serves as the first opening for the anime Mobile Suit Gundam 00, and the ending songs for the final episodes of both seasons. The first press versions of this single include Gundam 00 memorabilia. The Gundam 00 opening version is also playable in the Nintendo DS game Metcha! Taiko no Tatsujin DS: Nanatsu no Shima no Daibouken.

== Track listing ==
#	Title	Lyrics	Music
1	"Daybreak's Bell"	Hyde	Ken
2	"Natsu no Yuu-utsu [Sea in Blood 2007] (夏の憂鬱, Summer's Depression)"	Hyde	Ken
3	"Daybreak's Bell. (Hydeless Version)"	‐	Ken
4	"Natsu no Yuu-utsu [Sea in Blood 2007] (Tetsu P'unkless Version) (夏の憂鬱, Summer's Depression)"	‐	Ken

=== Oricon sales chart (Japan) ===
Daily rank	Weekly rank	Sales
1	1	179,000
