= Nexus 4/Shine =

Single by L'Arc-en-Ciel
- Released: August 27, 2008
- Genre: Pop rock, alternative rock
- Length: 15:56
- Label: Ki/oon
- Songwriters: Hyde, Tetsu
- Producer: L'Arc-en-ciel

L'Arc-en-Ciel singles chronology
"Drink It Down" (2008)	"Nexus 4/Shine" (2008)	"Bless" (2010)

"Nexus 4/Shine" is the thirty-sixth single by L'Arc-en-Ciel, released on August 27, 2008. The double A-side single features the song "Nexus 4" which was used in a commercial for the Subaru Legacy and the song "Shine" which was used as the opening song for the NHK anime series Guardian of the Spirit. "Nexus 4/Shine" reached number 2 on the Oricon Singles Chart and sold 109,752 in the first week.

== Track listing ==
All lyrics are written by Hyde.

No.	Title	Lyrics	Music	Length
1.	"Nexus 4"	Hyde	Tetsu	3:51
2.	"Shine"	Hyde	Tetsu	4:10
3.	"Nexus 4 (Hydeless version)"	-	Tetsu	3:51
4.	"Shine (Hydeless version)"	-	Tetsu	4:04
