= Chase (L'Arc-en-Ciel song) =

Single by L'Arc-en-Ciel
- Released: December 21, 2011
- Genre: Alternative rock
- Length: 19:36
- Label: Ki/oon
- Songwriter(s): hyde, ken

L'Arc-en-Ciel singles chronology
"X X X" (2011)	"Chase" (2011)	"Everlasting" (2014)

"Chase" is the fortieth single by L'Arc-en-Ciel, released on December 21, 2011. The single reached number 2 on the Oricon chart, selling 71,894 copies in the first week.

The song was used for live action film adaptation of Wild 7, released on December 21, 2011.

== Track listing ==
All lyrics are written by Hyde, when lyrics are present.

Disc one
No.	Title	Music	Length
1.	"Chase"	hyde, ken	4:25
2.	"My Dear -L'Acoustic version-"	hyde (L'Acoustic version by ken)	5:15
3.	"Chase (Hydeless version)"	hyde	4:25
4.	"My Dear -L'Acoustic version- (Hydeless version)"	hyde (L'Acoustic version by ken)	5:15
