= Bless (song) =

Single by L'Arc-en-Ciel
- Released: January 27, 2010
- Genre: Pop rock
- Length: 23:15
- Label: Ki/oon
- Songwriter: Hyde
- Producer: L'Arc-en-Ciel

L'Arc-en-Ciel singles chronology
"Nexus 4/Shine" (2008)	"Bless" (2010)	"I Love Rock'n Roll" (2010)

"Bless" is the thirty-seventh single by L'Arc-en-Ciel, released on January 27, 2010. It was used as the theme song to the NHK broadcast of the 2010 Vancouver Olympics. "Bless" reached number 2 on the Oricon singles chart, selling 80,859 copies during the first week.

== Track listing ==
All lyrics are written by Hyde, when lyrics are present.

No.	Title	Lyrics	Music	Length
1.	"Bless"	Hyde	Hyde	4:57
2.	"Bless -Concerto-"		Hyde	5:37
3.	"Route 666 -2010-" (P'unk-en-Ciel)	Hyde	Hyde	3:40
4.	"Bless (Hydeless Version)"		Hyde	4:55
5.	"Route 666 -2010- (T.E.Z P'unkless Version)" (P'unk-en-Ciel)		Hyde	3:41
