= Shinshoku (Lose Control) =

Single by L'Arc-en-Ciel

from the album Godzilla: The Album and Ray
- Released: July 8, 1998
- Genre: Alternative rock
- Length: 10:08
- Label: Ki/oon
- Songwriters: Hyde, Ken
- Producers: L'Arc-en-Ciel, Hajime Okano

L'Arc-en-Ciel singles chronology
"Dive to Blue" (1998)	"Shinshoku (Lose Control)" (1998)	"Snow Drop" (1998)

"Shinshoku (Lose Control)" (浸食 〜lose control〜; Erosion) is the thirteenth single by L'Arc-en-Ciel. It was released simultaneously with "Honey" and "Kasou" on July 8, 1998. The single reached number 2 on the Oricon chart. It was re-released on August 30, 2006.

The song was used briefly in the background of the American film Godzilla and was included on the Japanese, Taiwanese and the Asean edition of the soundtrack Godzilla: The Album. "Lose Control" was ranked at number twentieth on the 1998 end-of-year Oricon single chart, where it sold 938,530 copies.

== Track listing ==
#	Title	Length	Lyrics	Music
1	"Shinshoku (Lose Control)"	4:44	Hyde	Ken
2	"Shinshoku (Lose Control) (Control Experiment Mix)"	7:17	Hyde	Ken*

* Remix by Yukihiro.

== Covers ==
Fantôme Iris, a fictional visual kei band from multimedia franchise Argonavis from BanG Dream! covered the song on their first solo live Fantôme Iris 1st LIVE -C'est la vie!-.
