= Honey (L'Arc-en-Ciel song) =

Single by L'Arc~en~Ciel

from the album Ray
- Released: July 8, 1998
- Genre: Alternative rock
- Length: 3:48
- Label: Ki/oon Records
- Songwriter(s): Hyde
- Producer(s): L'Arc-en-Ciel, Hajime Okano

L'Arc~en~Ciel singles chronology
"Dive to Blue" (1998)	"Honey" (1998)	"Snow Drop" (1998)

"Honey" is the eleventh single by L'Arc-en-Ciel. It was released simultaneously with "Shinshoku ~Lose Control~" and "Kasou" on July 8, 1998. "Honey" was used as the main theme song and ending song for the TBS Television Football highlights programme "Super Soccer".

The release day of "Honey" was the same as B'z's single "Home". B'z had already had 20 consecutive number-one singles on the Oricon weekly charts, approaching Seiko Matsuda's record of 24. "Honey" recorded first week sales of over 544,000 copies, but "Home" debuted at No. 1 with sales of over 559,000 copies. Nevertheless, it topped the Oricon charts the following week and sold over one million copies. The single was re-released on August 30, 2006.

== Track listing ==
#	Title	Lyrics	Music
1	"Honey"	Hyde	Hyde

== Chart positions ==
Chart (1998)	Peak position
Japan Oricon	1
