= Good Luck My Way =

Single by L'Arc-en-Ciel
- Released: June 29, 2011
- Recorded: 2011
- Genre: Pop rock, Alternative rock
- Label: Ki/oon
- Songwriters: Hyde, Tetsuya

L'Arc-en-Ciel singles chronology
"I Love Rock'n Roll" (2010)	"Good Luck My Way" (2011)	"X X X" (2011)

Music video
- "Good Luck My Way" on YouTube

"Good Luck My Way" is the thirty-eighth single, and first 20th L'Anniversary's single, by L'Arc-en-Ciel, released on June 29, 2011. It was used as the closing theme song of Fullmetal Alchemist: The Sacred Star of Milos. Released in three different editions; a standard, a limited, which came with a DVD of "Good Luck My Way" music clip compilation, and a "Fullmetal Alchemist". The later version contains; all of L'Arc-en-Ciel's songs that were used for the franchise, and a DVD of "Good Luck My Way" music clip "Fullmetal Alchemist" version compilation and Fullmetal Alchemist: The Sacred Star of Milos theatrical version and TV spot (all 7 versions).

== Track listing ==
#	Title	Artist	Lyrics	Music
1	"Good Luck My Way"	L'Arc-en-Ciel	hyde	tetsuya
2	"Metropolis 2011"	P'unk-En-Ciel	hyde	ken
3	"Good Luck My Way (hydeless Version)"	L'Arc-en-Ciel	‐	tetsuya
4	"Metropolis 2011 (T.E.Z P'unkless Version)"	P'unk-En-Ciel	‐	ken
