= Kasou =

Single by L'Arc-en-Ciel

from the album Ray
- Released: July 8, 1998
- Genre: Alternative rock, gothic rock
- Length: 5:09
- Label: Ki/oon Records
- Songwriter(s): Hyde, Ken
- Producer(s): L'Arc-en-Ciel, Hajime Okano

L'Arc-en-Ciel singles chronology
"Dive to Blue" (1998)	"Kasou" (1998)	"Snow Drop" (1998)

"Kasou" (Japanese: 花葬, Kasō, Flower Burial) is the twelfth single by L'Arc-en-Ciel. It was released simultaneously with "Honey" and "Shinshoku ~Lose Control~" on July 8, 1998. The song was used as the ending theme to TV Asahi's Shinsou Kyumei! Uwasa no Flie. The single debuted at number 4 on the Oricon chart. It was re-released on August 30, 2006. The single was also rerecorded by P'unk~en~ciel in 2012 as "花葬 平成十七年", in the album "P'unk is Not Dead".

== Track listing ==
#	Title	Length	Lyrics	Music
1	"Kasou"	5:09	Hyde	Ken

== Kanji meaning ==
花, pronounced "ka", means "flower". 葬, pronounced "sou", means "burial" or "funeral"
Together, the kanji means "burial flowers"
