= Jojoushi =

Single by L'Arc-en-Ciel

from the album Awake
- Released: May 18, 2005
- Genre: Pop rock
- Label: Ki/oon Records
- Songwriter(s): Hyde, Ken
- Producer(s): L'Arc-en-Ciel, Hajime Okano

L'Arc-en-Ciel singles chronology
"New World" (2005)	"Jojoushi" (2005)	"Link" (2005)

"Jojoushi" (叙情詩, Jojōshi; Lyrical Poetry) is the twenty-eighth single by L'Arc-en-Ciel, released on May 18, 2005. It debuted at number one on the Oricon chart. The music video for "Jojoushi" was nominated for the 2005 Japan Media Arts Festival.

== Track listing ==
#	Title	Lyrics	Music
1	"Jojoushi"	Hyde	Ken
2	"Heaven's Drive 2005"	Hyde	Hyde
3	"Jojoushi (Hydeless Version)"	‐	Ken
4	"Heaven's Drive 2005 (Tetsu P'unkless Version)"	‐	Hyde
