= Sayaka Aoki (comedian) =

Japanese television personality and comedian

- 青木 さやか or 青木 沙耶加
- Born: March 27, 1973 (age 53)
- Occupation: Entertainer Comedian Actress

Sayaka Aoki (青木 さやか or 青木 沙耶加, Aoki Sayaka; born March 27, 1973) is a Japanese entertainer, comedian, and actress from Owariasahi, Aichi Prefecture.

== Career ==
Aoki started her career by working as a free announcer at a local TV station and as an attendant to a TV star. When she landed an introductory spot in a late-night TV show, she introduced herself as wanting to become a "funny TV star" which was taken as an aspiration to become a comedian. At one time, Aoki was part of a five-person comedy group called Onsen Konnyaku Acrobat Show. After leaving this group, she went back to working solo. She was scouted by Watanabe Entertainment's president, Miki Watanabe, when she guest starred in a Watanabe Entertainment Comedy Live Show.

Aoki's popularity grew around the fall of 2003 as she started appearing in Fuji TV Network's Warau Inu No Taiyo (The Sun of the Laughing Dog), NepLeague and TV Asahi's Out of Order, thanks to the strong promotion by her agency. She also grew popular by performing comedy sketches on Enta no Kamisama (The God of Entertainment). Aoki furthered her career by taking on acting and narrating roles in addition to her comedian career. Aoki was the first person to host the FNS ALL STARS: 25 HRS TELEVISION as an official Fuji TV Announcer (which was designated just for this occasion) and read the last notes.

On August 10, 2004, Aoki appeared as a gravure idol on the "Weekly Post" Magazine. On October 12, 2004, Aoki introduced her boyfriend at the time on London Hearts Three Hour Special, contributing to the highest TV rating ever (Avg 22.1%, 30.4% for the moment of her boyfriend's appearance) for the show. On April 13, 2005, she published her photobook"Où Voyez-vous?" (meaning "what are you looking at?" in French) which sold out all 20,000 copies of the first print in three days.

On October 25, 2007, Aoki published an "I Novel" (auto-biography) titled Because I'm 34, I'm feeling happy (ISBN 978-4334975272).

Aoki occasionally presents her piano skills on TV, especially on her own late-night TV show Utsukushiki Aoki De Now. She is one of the hosts for the music variety show, Music Fighter.
