= Jiyuu e no Shoutai =

Single by L'Arc-en-Ciel

from the album Awake
- Released: June 2, 2004
- Genre: Alternative rock
- Label: Ki/oon Records
- Songwriters: hyde, tetsu
- Producers: L'Arc-en-Ciel, Hajime Okano

L'Arc-en-Ciel singles chronology
"Hitomi no Juunin" (2004)	"Jiyuu e no Shoutai" (2004)	"Killing Me" (2005)

"Jiyuu e no Shoutai" (自由への招待, Jiyū e no Shōtai; lit. "Invitation to Freedom") is the twenty-fifth single by L'Arc-en-Ciel, released on June 2, 2004. Its B-side "Milky Way" is the first song that was performed by their alter ego, P'unk-en-Ciel. The single debuted at the number one position on the Oricon chart, and was certified Platinum by RIAJ for shipment of 250,000 copies.

== Track listing ==
#	Title	Lyrics	Music
1	"Jiyuu e no Shoutai"	hyde	tetsu
2	"Jiyuu e no Shoutai (hydeless Version)"	‐	tetsu
3	"Milky Way"	tetsu	tetsu
4	"Milky Way (Tetsu P'unkless Version)"	‐	tetsu
