= Drink It Down (L'Arc-en-Ciel song) =

"Drink it Down"
- Regular edition cover

Single by L'Arc-en-Ciel
- Released: April 2, 2008
- Genre: Alternative rock, hard rock
- Length: 16:30
- Label: Ki/oon
- Songwriters: Hyde, Yukihiro

L'Arc-en-Ciel singles chronology
"Hurry Xmas" (2007)	"Drink it Down" (2008)	"Nexus 4 / Shine" (2008)

"Drink it Down" is the thirty-fifth single by L'Arc-en-Ciel, released on April 2, 2008. The single debuted at number one on the Oricon chart. It was the theme song of Devil May Cry 4 video game.

== Track listing ==
All lyrics are written by Hyde.

Disc one
No.	Title	Music	Length
1.	"Drink it Down"	Yukihiro	4:05
2.	"Dune 2008" (P'unk-en-Ciel)	Tetsu	4:11
3.	"Drink it Down (Hydeless version)"	Yukihiro	4:06
4.	"Dune 2008 (Tetsu P'unkless version)" (P'unk-en-Ciel)	Tetsu	4:05
