= Ready Steady Go (L'Arc-en-Ciel song) =

Single by L'Arc-en-Ciel

from the album Smile
- Released: February 4, 2004
- Genre: Alternative rock
- Label: Ki/oon Records
- Songwriters: Hyde, Tetsu
- Producers: L'Arc-en-Ciel, Hajime Okano

L'Arc-en-Ciel singles chronology
"Spirit Dreams Inside (Another Dream)" (2001)	"Ready Steady Go" (2004)	"Hitomi no Juunin" (2004)

Music video
- "Ready Steady Go" on YouTube

"Ready Steady Go" is the twenty-third single by L'Arc-en-Ciel, released on February 4, 2004; it reached number 1 on the Oricon chart. The four alternate versions on the single omit each titular band member's contributions; for instance, the "Hydeless Version" features none of hyde's vocals (but still contains the backing vocals), while the "Yukihiroless Version" has no percussion whatsoever.

"Ready Steady Go" was used as the second (first in the U.S. Adult Swim broadcast) opening song to the first Fullmetal Alchemist anime series. It was featured as a song in the Japan-exclusive Nintendo DS launch music video game, Daigasso! Band Brothers, along with the Japan-exclusive 2005 iNiS music video game Osu! Tatakae! Ouendan as the last stage.

== Track listing ==
#	Title	Lyrics	Music
1	"Ready Steady Go"	Hyde	Tetsu
2	"Ready Steady Go (Hydeless Version)"	‐	Tetsu
3	"Ready Steady Go (Kenless Version)"	Hyde	Tetsu
4	"Ready Steady Go (Tetsuless Version)"	Hyde	Tetsu
5	"Ready Steady Go (Yukihiroless Version)"	Hyde	Tetsu

== Covers ==
American punk rock band Zebrahead loosely translated and covered the song, which features on a tribute album to L'Arc-en-Ciel. It was also released as a Japanese bonus track on their 2013 album Call Your Friends.

Three fictional groups from Bushiroad's multimedia franchises have covered the song. A cover by Afterglow from the BanG Dream! band series became playable in the Girls Band Party! game beginning October 27, 2017; a full version is included in the BanG Dream! Girls Band Party! Cover Collection Vol.1 released on June 27, 2018. Argonavis, of the related Argonavis from BanG Dream!, had a cover added to its AAside game on January 14, 2021. The D4DJ project has a cover by Photon Maiden that is playable in D4DJ Groovy Mix and has been performed live.
