= New World (L'Arc-en-Ciel song) =

Single by L'Arc-en-Ciel

from the album Awake
- Released: April 6, 2005
- Genre: Alternative rock
- Label: Ki/oon Records
- Songwriters: Yukihiro, Hyde
- Producers: L'Arc-en-Ciel, Hajime Okano

L'Arc-en-Ciel singles chronology
| "Killing Me" (2005) | "New World" (2005) | "Jojoushi" (2005) |

"New World" is the twenty-seventh single by L'Arc-en-Ciel, released on April 6, 2005. It debuted at number 1 on the Oricon chart.

== Track listing ==
| # | Title | Lyrics | Music |
|---|---|---|---|
| 1 | "New World" | Yukihiro | Yukihiro, Hyde |
| 2 | "Kasou Heisei 17 Nen (花葬 平成十七年, "Flower Burial 2005) | Hyde | Ken |
| 3 | "New World (Hydeless Version)" | ‐ | Yukihiro, Hyde |
| 4 | "Kasou Heisei 17 Nen (Tetsu P'unkless Version)" | ‐ | Ken |
