= L'Arc-en-Ciel =

Japanese rock band

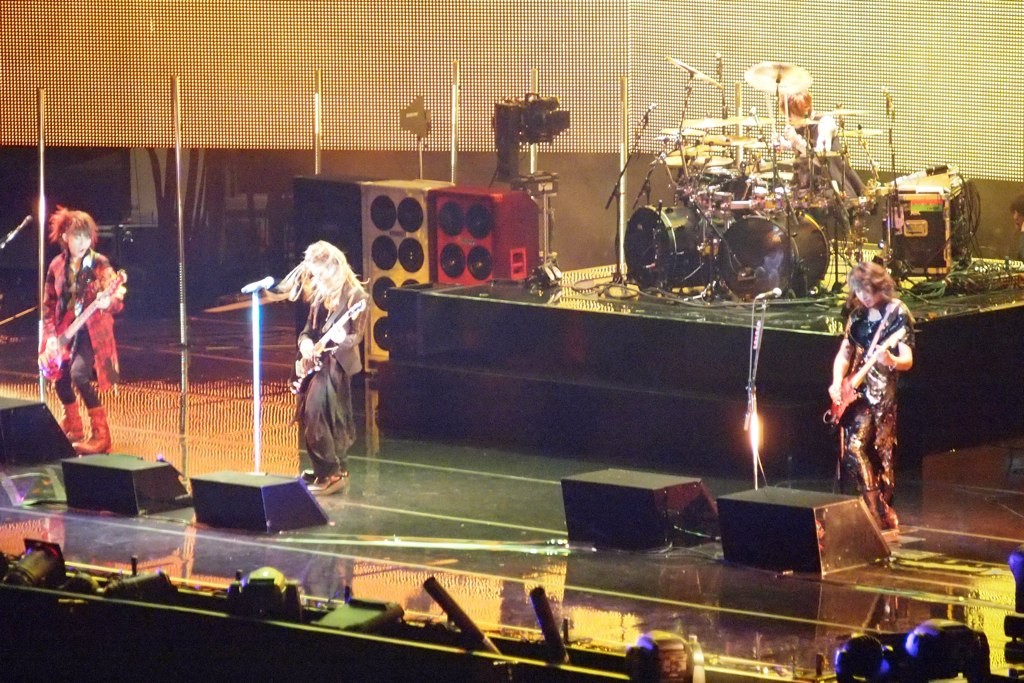
- L'Arc-en-Ciel performing at Madison Square Garden in March 2012

Background information
- Also known as: P'unk-en-Ciel, The Zombies, D'ark-en-Ciel
- Origin: Osaka, Japan
- Genres: Alternative rock; pop rock; post-punk (early)
- Works: L'Arc-en-Ciel discography
- Years active: 1991–present
- Labels: Night Gallery; Danger Crue; Ki/oon; Tofu (US); Gan-Shin (EU)
- Members: Tetsuya; Hyde; Ken; Yukihiro
- Past members: Hiro; Pero; Sakura
- Website: www.larc-en-ciel.com

L'Arc-en-Ciel (Japanese: ラルク アン シエル, Hepburn: Raruku an Shieru; French for "The Rainbow"), stylized as L'Arc〜en〜Ciel and abbreviated as Laruku, is a Japanese rock band formed in Osaka in 1991 by bassist Tetsuya and vocalist Hyde. Following the departure of original members Hiro and Pero, guitarist Ken and drummer Sakura were recruited to replace them in 1992 and 1993, respectively. While they first got their start as a visual kei band, L'Arc-en-Ciel have not had any association with the movement since their major label debut in 1994. Sakura left the band in 1997 and was replaced by Yukihiro in January 1998, completing the current line-up.

With a reported 40 million records sold, L'Arc-en-Ciel are one of the best-selling music artists in Japan. Their 1999 simultaneously-released albums Ark and Ray are each one of the best-selling albums of all time in Japan. L'Arc-en-Ciel have had seven number one studio albums and 21 number one singles. They were ranked number 58 on a 2003 list of the top 100 Japanese pop musicians by HMV Japan, and were the first Japanese act to headline Madison Square Garden in New York City.

L'Arc-en-Ciel begin their career as indie act with first album Dune in 1993, which topped the indie chart. They made major label debut in July 1994 with Tierra. In the 1990s, they had numerous hits songs such as "flower", "Niji", "Winter Fall", "Honey", "Kasou", "Shinshoku~lose control~", "Snow drop", "Forbidden lover", "Dive to blue", "Heven's drive", and "Driver's High". In the 2000s and 2010s, they topped the charts with songs such as "Neo Universe", "Ready Steady Go", "Hitomi no Juunin", "Jojoushi", "My Draws A Dream", "Daybreak's Bell", "Drink it down", and "XXX".

Since the late 1990s, they have frequently performed live in stadium-class venue. In 1999, they attracted 650,000 people to a 12 show tour of outdoor venues, and in 2000 they embarked on a four dome tour in Japan. Furthermore, in 2014, they held a concert at the National Stadium (formerly the National Stadium) that drew 80,000 people (160,000 over two days), setting a new record for the largest audience. In 2025, they held their 20th solo concert at the Tokyo Dome.

== History ==
=== 1991–1997: Formation, major label debut and Sakura's departure ===
In February 1991, bassist Tetsuya (then known as TETSU) recruited vocalist Hyde (then known as HIDE), guitarist Hiro and drummer Pero. Together, they formed a band and named themselves L'Arc-en-Ciel. A year later, after gaining popularity in their hometown of Osaka, Hiro left the band on June 12, 1992. Tetsuya then convinced his friend Ken to quit his university studies and join the band as guitarist. However, Pero then left the group after their show at Osaka Muse Hall on December 30, 1992. The following year, Sakura joined as L'Arc-en-Ciel's new drummer.

On April 1, 1993, the band released their debut album Dune on the independent, but well-known, record label Danger Crue. The album was a success and ranked number one on the Oricon indies charts. This caught the attention of some major labels. In 1994, L'Arc-en-Ciel signed a contract with Sony Music Entertainment Japan's Ki/oon division. They released their major debut album Tierra that same year. Their third album Heavenly followed in 1995. In 1996, their fourth album, True, became their first to sell over a million copies.

On February 24, 1997, drummer Sakura was arrested for violating the Stimulants Control Law. In May, he received a two year prison sentence suspended for three years. When news of the arrest became public, the group's CDs were removed from the shelves in record shops. Their song "The Fourth Avenue Cafe" was replaced as the fourth ending theme of the Rurouni Kenshin anime after only four episodes and its single release was halted. (It was eventually released in 2006.)

Over the next few months, the group continued to be featured in magazines as a trio. On October 17, the single "Niji" was released without Sakura. Instead, it features former Zi:Kill and Die in Cries drummer Yukihiro as a support member. Sakura officially announced his departure from L'Arc-en-Ciel on November 4. The remaining members formed "The Zombies", which was advertised as a "copy band" singing L'Arc-en-Ciel songs. The end of their hiatus was marked by a concert at the Tokyo Dome on December 23, 1997, entitled Reincarnation. It was the band's first performance at the venue and had an attendance of 56,000 people, with the tickets sold out in a record-breaking four minutes.

=== 1998–2003: Blockbuster success and hiatus ===
Official L'Arc-en-Ciel logo during 2010s

Yukihiro officially joined L'Arc-en-Ciel as their drummer on January 1, 1998. The single "Winter Fall", which was released at the end of the month, became the group's first number one on the Oricon Singles Chart. They subsequently released their album Heart on February 25, 1998. The band's song "Lose Control" was included in the Japanese and Philippine releases of the official movie soundtrack of Godzilla, released on May 19, 1998, through Epic Records.

On July 1, 1999, the group released two albums, Ark and Ray, simultaneously. These two albums became the first Japanese albums to be released simultaneously in other Asian countries outside Japan. Both albums topped the Oricon music charts, with Ark occupying number one and Ray number two and each selling over two million copies. This, along with the 1999 Grand Cross Tour which united over 650,000 people in 12 concerts, marked the commercial high point of the group's career.

In 2000, two of the band's songs were included in the soundtrack for Ring 0: Birthday. Their next album Real, released on August 30, 2000, was their last studio album for some time. Its song "Stay Away" was featured in the arcade game DrumMania 4th Mix. The compilation album Clicked Singles Best 13 was released on March 14, 2001. It includes twelve songs chosen online by the group's fans. It also includes an additional thirteenth song, "Anemone". Their album Real was re-released as a Super Audio CD on July 4, 2001. "Spirit Dreams Inside (Another Dream)", released on September 5, 2001, was L'Arc-en-Ciel's last single before a long period of inactivity. The English-language version of the single's title track was adopted as Final Fantasy: The Spirits Within's ending theme song.

During this period of inactivity, the members began working on solo careers and side projects. In 2001, Tetsuya started his solo career under the name Tetsu69 and Yukihiro formed the band Acid Android. The following year, Ken founded Sons of All Pussys with L'Arc-en-Ciel's former drummer Sakura. Hyde released two solo albums, Roentgen (2002) and 666 (2003), and co-starred in the 2003 movie Moon Child. He also played the part of Adam in the film Kagen no Tsuki (2004).

Three compilation albums; The Best of L'Arc-en-Ciel 1994–1998, The Best of L'Arc-en-Ciel 1998–2000 and The Best of L'Arc-en-Ciel C/W, were released on March 19, 2003. The album series included all of their previous singles, with the exception of "Spirit Dreams Inside (Another Dream)".

=== 2003–2006: Comeback and international activities ===
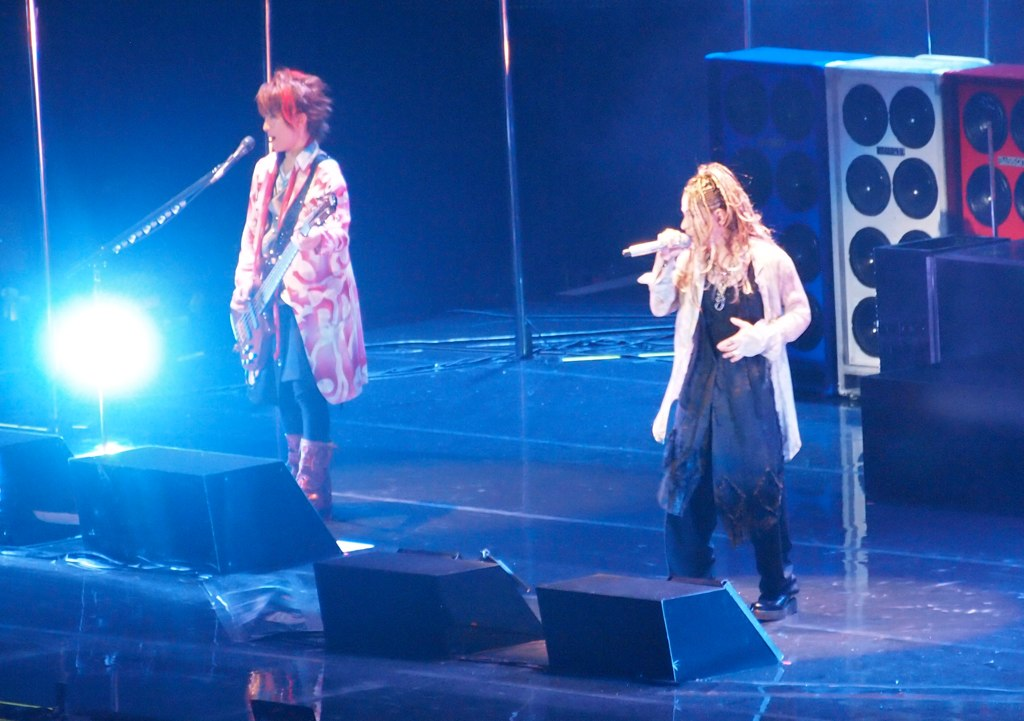
tetsuya and hyde performing at Madison Square Garden, 2012

After two and a half years, L'Arc-en-Ciel performed a series of seven concerts, entitled Shibuya Seven Days, in Tokyo in June 2003. During this event, the group announced that a new album would be released the following year. "Ready Steady Go", the group's first single in more than three years, was released in February 2004. This song was used as an opening theme song for the Fullmetal Alchemist anime. The single topped the Oricon weekly singles charts. Additionally, a sample of this song was also used in a Nintendo DS game called Osu! Tatakae! Ouendan. The group subsequently released another single, "Hitomi no Juunin", in early March 2004. This was followed by the group's album, Smile, on March 31. Shortly after, on June 2, the single "Jiyuu e no Shoutai" was the first to feature a song by P'unk-en-Ciel.

On July 31, 2004, L'Arc-en-Ciel made their North American debut at the anime convention Otakon. Approximately 12,000 people attended the concert, which was held at the 1st Mariner Arena. They were the first Japanese band to perform at the arena. On May 31, 2005, Tofu Records, Sony Music Japan's U.S. label, released a DVD of their 2004 Otakon concert.

In 2005, the band released various singles, including "Killing Me", "New World" and "Jojoushi". These were later complied onto the album Awake, which was released on June 22, 2005. It features twelve tracks, including "Lost Heaven", the ending theme song of Fullmetal Alchemist the Movie: Conqueror of Shamballa. Another of the band's single, "Link", was released on July 20, 2005. This song was also featured in the movie as the opening theme song, and was included on their next album, entitled Kiss.

In August 2005, the band went on a nationwide tour for their album Awake. It was followed by another tour titled Asia Live 2005, which had the band performing in Seoul and Shanghai and ended at the Tokyo Dome. Following these two tours, L'Arc-en-Ciel's members turned their attention back to their own solo projects. Tetsuya began recording with Morrie for his solo project Creature Creature. Yukihiro regrouped his band Acid Android and released the single "Let's Dance" on April 5, 2006. Acid Android joined Mucc to perform two concerts in Shanghai in April 2006. Hyde composed "Glamorous Sky", the theme song of the film adaption of the manga Nana. The song was sung by pop singer Mika Nakashima, the first time hyde composed music for another vocalist. In addition, his own solo album, Faith, was released on April 26, 2006. Hyde also went on a five-month tour throughout Japan to publicize his album. After signing with Tofu Records, he held four small concerts in the United States in July 2006, making his US debut. This was the first of L'Arc-en-Ciel's solo projects to be held outside Japan. On August 23, 2006, ken released a solo single entitled "Speed".

=== 2006–2010: 15th anniversary and concert hiatus ===
On November 25 and 26, 2006, L'Arc-en-Ciel played two shows at the Tokyo Dome to celebrate their 15th anniversary. The tickets for these concerts sold out in two minutes, breaking the venue's previous record, which was also set by them. A poll was created on their official website, during the weeks before the concert, which allowed fans to pick the songs they would like to hear at the show. The concert was later broadcast on the WOWOW channel on December 23, 2006, and was subsequently broadcast on Korean MTV on February 8, 2007.

L'Arc-en-Ciel recorded the song "Shine", which was to be used as the opening song for the NHK anime Moribito: Guardian of the Spirit. In the spring of 2007, the group kicked off their Mata Heart ni hi wo Tsukero 2007 tour in Japan. They also released the single "Seventh Heaven" on May 30, 2007, which topped the Oricon charts. Their song "My Heart Draws a Dream", which was used in a Subaru commercial, was also released as a single on August 29, 2007. This single also topped the Oricon charts.

L'Arc-en-Ciel subsequently recorded the song "Daybreak's Bell", which was used as the first opening theme for the anime Mobile Suit Gundam 00. This song was released as a single on October 10, 2007, later topping the Oricon weekly charts. From November 14 to December 25, 2007, they released a limited edition single titled "Hurry Xmas", along with two new DVDs, titled 15th L'Anniversary Live and Chronicle 3. Their studio album Kiss was released on November 21, 2007, and debuted at number one on the Oricon charts.

L'Arc-en-Ciel then performed the Theater of Kiss tour, which was held from December 22, 2007, to February 17, 2008. The song "Drink It Down" was used as the Japanese opening song for the PS3/Xbox 360 game Devil May Cry 4. It was released as a single on April 2, 2008, and topped the Oricon weekly charts. The band went on a tour, entitled Tour 2008 L'7: Trans Asia via Paris, which covered several major Asian cities, as well as Paris, France. On this tour, a live show hiatus until 2011 was announced, although new material would still continue to be released.

Their double A-side single "Nexus 4/Shine" and the DVD Tour 2007-2008 Theater of Kiss were released together on August 27, 2008. On May 20, 2009, L'Arc-en-Ciel released the DVD of their live concert in Paris, titled Live in Paris. hyde and K.A.Z formed the hard rock group Vamps and released their self-titled first album, Vamps, on June 10, 2009. On December 1, 2009, L'Arc-en-Ciel announced the release of a new single named "Bless" on January 27, 2010. This was used as the theme song for NHK's broadcast of the 2010 Vancouver Olympics. Also, tetsu announced that he had changed his stage name to "tetsuya" and released his first artist book. The book, which ranked number six amongst the Talent Book Charts, featured early live pictures and a 30,000 character interview with the bassist.

On March 10, 2010, L'Arc-en-Ciel released their fifth "best of" album, entitled Quadrinity: Member's Best Selections. It contained 4 CDs with 7 tracks chosen and remastered by each band member. The first press edition of this compilation also came with a DVD that included a variety quiz show titled The L'Arquiz.

=== 2011–2013: 20th anniversary and world tour ===
Ending their live show hiatus on January 1, 2011, L'Arc-en-Ciel celebrated both their 20th anniversary and the New Year with the midnight concert L'A Happy New Year! at Makuhari Messe. On February 16, they released the compilation album Twenity, which consists of three parts: Twenity 1991-1996, Twenity 1997-1999, and Twenity 2000-2010. The albums are an all-around "best of" collection of the band, covering everything from the formation of the group, including their hit singles up to their newest works. A box set entitled Twenity Box was later released on March 9 and contains all three of the albums. It also came with a special digest DVD that covered the 20-year history of the band, a deluxe booklet, and a special music box that contained either "Flower", "Anata", "New World", or "My Heart Draws a Dream" at random.

Later, it was announced that L'Arc-en-Ciel would provide the theme song for Fullmetal Alchemist the Movie: The Sacred Star of Milos, entitled "Good Luck My Way". This is their fourth contribution to the Fullmetal Alchemist franchise. The song was released as their first 20th L'Anniversary single on June 29, 2011. To further celebrate their 20 years together, L'Arc-en-Ciel put on a 20th L'Anniversary Concert at Ajinomoto Stadium in Tokyo on May 28–29, 2011, with each day dedicated to one half of their career. All of the proceeds from the concerts were donated to the Great East Japan earthquake relief efforts. Additionally, at the end of the concert, it was announced that there would be a L'Anniversary Japan Tour in 2011, as well as a world tour in 2012. On October 12, 2011, the second 20th L'Anniversary single was released, entitled "XXX" . L'Arc-en-Ciel was subsequently approached by the producers of the Wild 7 live-action film to perform the movie's theme song. Entitled "Chase", the song was released as the group's third L'Anniversary single on December 21.

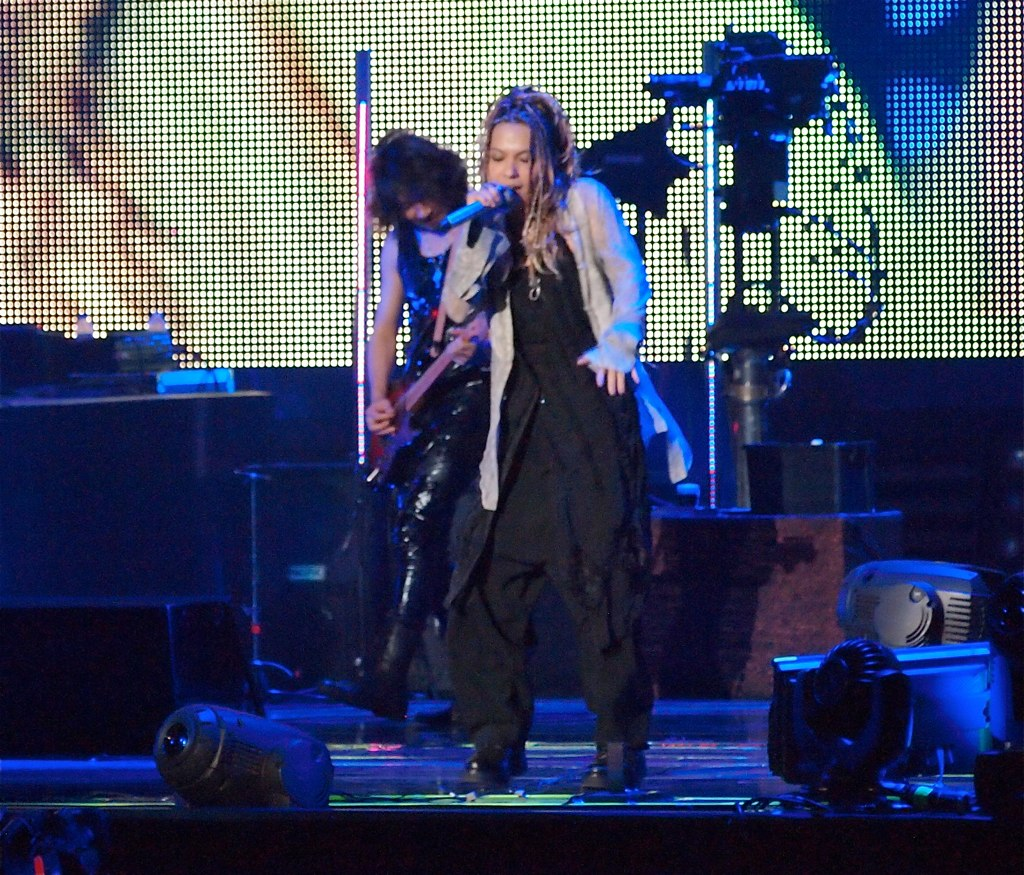
ken and hyde performing at Madison Square Garden, 2012

L'Arc-en-Ciel then announced that they would be releasing their twelfth studio album, and gave fans who bought "Chase" a sneak peek with a live internet broadcast of the band mastering the album on December 26 on Ustream. They also announced that their alter ego band P'unk-en-Ciel would be releasing their first album, titled P'unk is Not Dead, the same day. The band's twelfth album, Butterfly, was released on February 8, 2012. It includes all their singles from the single "Drink it Down" onwards and four new songs.

The band's 2012 world tour took them to Hong Kong on March 3, Bangkok on March 7, Shanghai on March 10, Taipei on March 17, New York on March 25, London on April 11, Paris on April 14, Singapore on April 28, Jakarta on May 2, Seoul on May 5, Yokohama on May 12–13, Osaka on May 19–20, Tokyo on May 26–27, and Honolulu on May 31. Their show in New York was originally scheduled to be at The Theater at Madison Square Garden on March 23, but was later moved to the main arena, making L'Arc-en-Ciel the first Japanese artist to be the headlining act at the legendary venue. They ended the tour by returning to the US for two nights in Honolulu, Hawaii on May 31 and June 1, the latter being for the group's fan club members only. At the first day, the mayor of Honolulu Peter Carlisle made a surprise appearance and declared May 31 "L’Arc~en~Ciel Day", saying he felt the band "made a great contribution to cultural activities, and built a bridge of friendship between Hawaii and Japan".

=== 2014–2022: 25th and 30th anniversaries ===
On March 21 and 22, 2014, the band played a two-day concert at the Japan National Stadium in Tokyo, where they also played and announced the future release of their new single "Everlasting". In June 2015, the band announced a two-day concert under the name of L'ArCasino, held at Yumeshima Outdoor Special Stage, Osaka, on September 21 and 22. As they did with the previous live performances in Tokyo, they played a single for a Christmas release, "Wing's Flap". In December 2016, the single "Don't be Afraid" was released. The song was used as the theme song for the film Resident Evil: The Final Chapter, and the video game Resident Evil 7. To promote their release, the band recorded a VR music video for the PlayStation 4, which features the band members fighting zombies in the franchise's fictional Racoon City.

In 2017, L'Arc-en-Ciel celebrated their 25th anniversary with two shows at the Tokyo Dome on April 9 and 10. Only 110,000 seats were available for the almost 600,000 fans who signed up for the ticket lotteries. In December 2018, L'Arc-en-Ciel's first Christmas live was held at the Tokyo Dome. In late 2019 the band reinforced their presence on social media, opening an official account on Instagram, as well as an official channel in YouTube. They also released most of their music albums across different music streaming services, including Apple Music and Spotify.

On January 9, 2020, the band started a new arena tour, the first one in eight years. A total of twelve live shows were to be held across five cities between January and March, starting with their home town at the Osaka-jō Hall. However, the last four concerts were cancelled due to coronavirus outbreak-related concerns.

Official L'Arc-en-Ciel logo

For the band's 30th anniversary in 2021, a partnership with Japanese TV-broadcasting station WOWOW was made. Starting in February 2021, the station broadcast most of L'Arc-en-Ciel's past concerts for several months. On May 29 and 30, the band played two concerts named L'Appy Birthday at Chiba's Makuhari Messe. On May 31, the band digitally released "Mirai", their first new song in almost five years. The single was used as the theme of the Bandai Namco video game Blue Protocol. A second single, "Forever", was announced as the second opening theme of the anime adaptation of Edens Zero on the day of its broadcast on July 3. The song was digitally released on August 8, 2021, while the physical version was released on September 21, 2021.

The national 30th L'Anniversary Tour saw the band play 19 concerts across Japan from September 5 to December 26. The tour's two final concerts were held at the Tokyo Dome on May 21 and 22, 2022.

On May 18, 2022, the band released L'Album Complete Box -Remastered Edition-, a compilation box containing remastered versions of all their albums from 1994 to 2012.

=== 2023–present: 2024 Arena Tour ===
On May 30, 2023, for its 30th anniversary, the band released a remastered edition of their first album Dune, released originally in 1993.

On December 7, 2023, the band announced a 10 dates national stadium tour titled 'Arena Tour 2024 Underground', which is set to start on February 8, 2024 until April 14, 2024. On September 13, 2024, their new single "You Gotta Run" was announced as the intro for the second season of the anime Beyblade X. The single was released digitally on October 18, 2024 and released physically on January 15, 2025.

The band performed at Tokyo Dome on January 18 and 19, with the concert named L'Arc-en-Ciel Live 2025 Hyde Birthday Celebration -Hyde 誕生祭- in honor of Hyde's birthday.

== Legacy and influence ==
With 40 million records sold, L'Arc-en-Ciel are one of the best-selling music artists in Japan. Their 1999 simultaneously-released albums Ark and Ray are each one of the best-selling albums of all time in Japan. In 2003, L'Arc-en-Ciel were ranked number 58 on a list of the top 100 Japanese pop musicians by HMV Japan. In 2012, they became the first Japanese act to headline Madison Square Garden in New York City. Hiroki Kamemoto, lead guitarist of Glim Spanky, became interested in music after hearing L'Arc-en-Ciel and Glay. Vocalist Eye and bassist Rio of the heavy metal band Mary's Blood both started bands because of L'Arc-en-Ciel. Masato Hayakawa of Coldrain, D vocalist Asagi, Vistlip vocalist Tomo and guitarist Yuh, and American disc jockey DJ Heavygrinder have all cited L'Arc-en-Ciel as an influence.

== P'unk-en-Ciel ==
P'unk-en-Ciel (stylized as P'UNK〜EN〜CIEL) is an alter ego of L'Arc-en-Ciel. Introduced in 2004, Hyde takes over the guitar, Ken the drums, Yukihiro plays the bass, while Tetsuya performs the vocals. P'unk-en-Ciel's songs have a more punk sound and their music is usually heavier and faster with a different tone due to Tetsuya's vocals. Hyde wears a pirate patch over his left eye in P'unk-en-Ciel performances. Yukihiro is known to wear a gas mask; however, this has only been seen once at a live concert during their Smile tour in 2004.

Each member is called in capital letters; T.E.Z P'UNK (formerly TETSU P'UNK), KEN P'UNK, HYDE P'UNK and YUKI P'UNK. Each member produces one song of their choice, and they alternate their productions.

P'unk-en-Ciel is the re-visitation of D'ark-en-Ciel (stylized as D'ARK〜EN〜CIEL), a special event that took place during concerts in the years when Sakura was their drummer. The only material released from D'ark-en-Ciel is the 18-minute self-titled B-side found on the (then) unreleased "The Fourth Avenue Cafe" single. Each member was called; DARK TETSU, HYDE DARK, Suck・D'ark・La and Kën D'Ark.

P'unk-en-Ciel songs have been recorded and used as B-sides on singles since 2004 and their performances can be found on live DVDs. They also featured television personality Sayaka Aoki (called P'UNK 青木) in the song "Round and Round 2005". On February 8, 2012, P'unk-en-Ciel released their first album P'unk is Not Dead, which contains all twelve songs they released up to that point.

=== P'unk-en-Ciel songs ===
Recorded versions released on singles:

- "Milky Way", found on the "Jiyuu e no Shoutai" single (Produced by HYDE P'UNK).
- "Round and Round 2005", found on the "Killing Me" single (Produced by KEN P'UNK).
- "Kasou Heisei 17 Nen", found on the "New World" single (Produced by HYDE P'UNK).
- "Heaven's Drive 2005", found on the "Jojoushi" single (Produced by YUKI P'UNK).
- "Promised land 2005", found on the "Link" single (Produced by TETSU P'UNK).
- "Honey 2007", found on the "Seventh Heaven" single (Produced by KEN P'UNK).
- "Feeling Fine 2007", found on the "My Heart Draws a Dream" single (Produced by YUKI P'UNK).
- "Natsu no Yuu-utsu [Sea in Blood 2007]", found on the "Daybreak's Bell" single (Produced by HYDE P'UNK).
- "I Wish 2007", found on the "Hurry Xmas" single (Produced by TETSU P'UNK - it also has a PV).
- "Dune 2008", found on the "Drink It Down" single (Produced by KEN P'UNK).
- "Route 666 -2010-", found on the "Bless" single (Produced by YUKI P'UNK).
- "Metropolis -2011-", found on the "Good Luck My Way" single (Produced by T.E.Z P'UNK).

Commercially released live performances:

- Smile Tour 2004 ("Milky Way")
- Asia Live 2005 ("Round and Round 2005")
- Are You Ready? 2007 Mata Heart ni hi wo Tsukero! ("Honey 2007" and "Feeling Fine 2007")
- Tour 2007-2008 Theater of Kiss ("Natsu no Yuutsu [Sea in Blood 2007]" and "I Wish 2007")
- Tour 2008 L'7: Trans Asia via Paris ("Feeling Fine 2007" and "Milky Way 2004")
- Five Live Archives 2 (Are You Ready? 2007 Mata Heart ni hi wo Tsukero!) ("Feeling Fine 2007" and "Honey 2007")

== Members ==
- Hyde – lead vocals, guitars, keyboards, harmonica (1991–present)
- Tetsuya – bass guitar, keyboards, backing vocals, bandleader (1991–present)
- Ken – guitars, keyboards, percussion, autoharp, backing vocals (1992–present)
- Yukihiro – drums, percussion, synthesizers (1998–present)

Former members

- Hiro – guitars (1991–1992)
- Pero – drums (1991–1992)
- Sakura – drums, percussion (1993–1997)

== Discography ==
- Dune (1993)
- Tierra (1994)
- Heavenly (1995)
- True (1996)
- Heart (1998)
- Ark (1999)
- Ray (1999)
- Real (2000)
- Smile (2004)
- Awake (2005)
- Kiss (2007)
- Butterfly (2012)
- P'unk Is Not Dead (2012) (as P'unk-en-Ciel)

== See also ==
- List of best-selling music artists in Japan
- Acid Android
- Sons of All Pussys
- Vamps
- Zigzo
