= Sid discography =

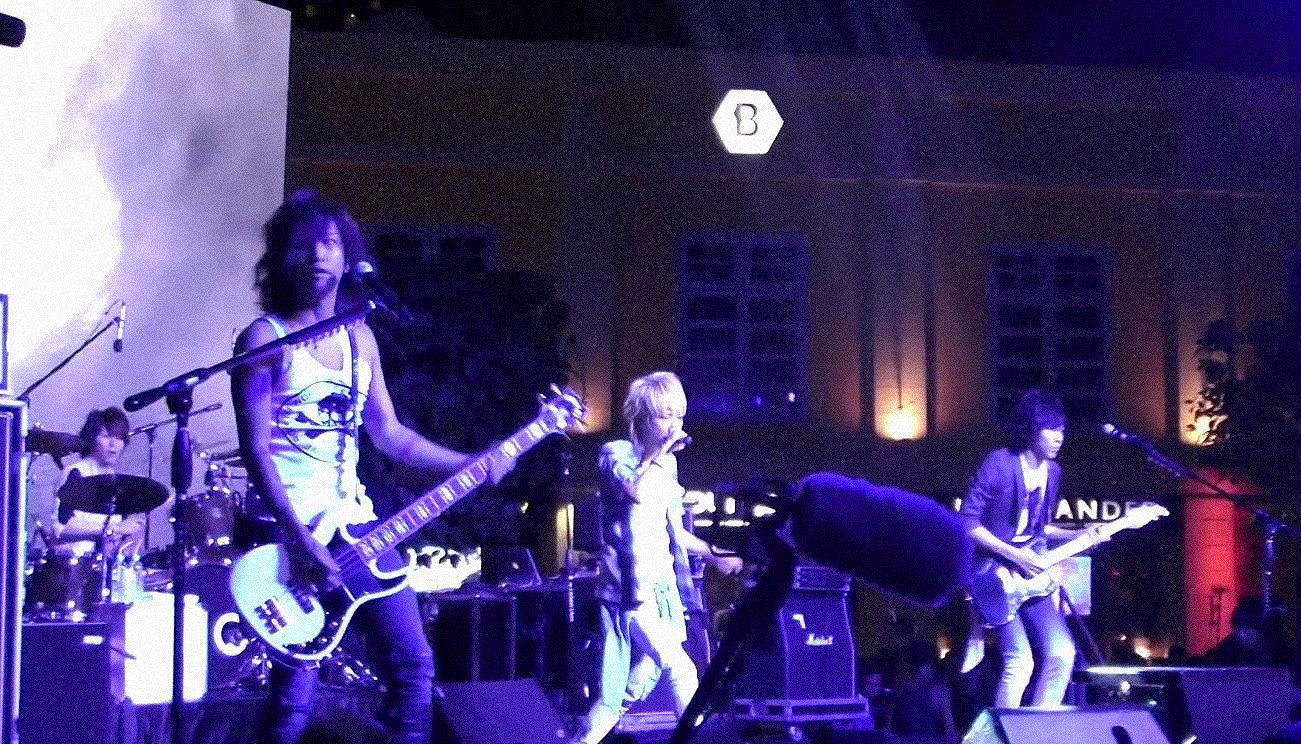
- Studio albums: 10
- EPs: 2
- Compilation albums: 6
- Singles: 39

Japanese band Sid's discography consists of 10 studio albums, 2 EPs, 6 compilations and 39 singles. Sid is a visual kei rock band formed in 2003 by Mao, Shinji, Aki and Yūya. They debuted on a major record label, Ki/oon Records in 2008 and since then have released several theme songs for anime or films.

== Studio albums ==
Title	Release	Peak position		RIAJ certification
Title	Release	Oricon	Billboard Japan	RIAJ certification
Renai (憐哀 -レンアイ-)	December 22, 2004	44		—N/a
Hoshi no Miyako (星の都)	November 16, 2005	26		—N/a
Play	November 8, 2006	9		—N/a
Sentimental Macchiato (センチメンタルマキアート)	February 20, 2008	8		—N/a
Hikari	July 1, 2009	2		Gold
Dead Stock	February 23, 2011	4		Gold
M&W	August 1, 2012	3		—N/a
Outsider	March 12, 2014	5		—N/a
Nomad	September 6, 2017	4	4	—N/a
Shōnin Yokkyū (承認欲求)	September 4, 2019	5	5	—N/a
Umibe (海辺)	March 23, 2022	11	13	—N/a

== EPs ==
Title	Release	Oricon peak position
Ichiban Suki na Basho (いちばん好きな場所)	August 22, 2018	8
Dark side	September 17, 2025	17

== Singles ==
Year	Title	Peak position		RIAJ certification	Album
Year	Title	Oricon	Billboard Japan Hot 100	RIAJ certification	Album
Indies
2003	"Yoshikai Manabu 17sai (Mushoku)" (吉開学17歳 (無職) ): Release: December 22	—	—	—N/a	Non album song
2005	"Sweet?": Release: October 12	23	—	—N/a	Hoshi no Miyako
2006	"Hosoi Koe" (ホソイコエ): Release: February 8	18	—	—N/a	Play
2006	"chapter 1": Release: June 14	10	—	—N/a	Play
2006	"Otegami" (御手紙): Release: August 16	9	—	—N/a	Play
2007	"Smile": Release: April 4	11	—	—N/a	Sentimental Macchiato
2007	"Natsukoi" (夏恋): Release: July 11	10	—	—N/a	Sentimental Macchiato
2007	"Mitsuyubi" (蜜指~ミツユビ~): Release: September 26	5	—	—N/a	Sentimental Macchiato
2007	"Namida no Ondo" (涙の温度): Release: December 5	4	—	—N/a	Sentimental Macchiato
Ki/oon Music
2008	"Monochrome no Kiss" (モノクロのキス): Release: October 29; Kuroshitsuji theme song	4	—	Platinum	Hikari
2009	"2°C Me no Kanojo" (2 °C目の彼女): Release: January 14	3	—	Gold	Hikari
2009	"Uso" (嘘): Release: April 29; Fullmetal Alchemist theme song	2	94	2× Platinum (digital); Gold (CD)	Hikari
2009	"One way": Release: November 11	3	5	—N/a	Dead Stock
2010	"Sleep": Release: March 3	2	4	—N/a	Dead Stock
2010	"Rain" (レイン): Release: June 2; Fullmetal Alchemist theme song	2	1	Platinum	Dead Stock
2010	"cosmetic": Release: September 29	3	5	—N/a	Dead Stock
2010	"Ranbu no Melody" (乱舞のメロディ): Release: December 1; Bleach theme song	5	9	Gold	Dead Stock
2011	"Itsuka" (いつか): Release: September 28	2	3	—N/a	M&W
2011	"Fuyu no Bench" (冬のベンチ ): Release: December 28	6	43	—N/a	M&W
2012	"Nokoriga" (残り香): Release: May 2	5	11	—N/a	M&W
2012	"S": Release: May 9; Sadako 3D theme song	4	4	—N/a	M&W
2012	"V.I.P": Release: November 21; Magi theme song	4	7	Gold	Outsider
2012	"Koi ni Ochite" (恋におちて): Release: April 10	4	—	—N/a	Outsider
2013	"Sa-Ma-La-Va" (サマラバ ): Release: July 24	7	15	—N/a	Outsider
2013	"Anniversary": Release: November 6; Magi theme song	6	18	—N/a	Outsider
2014	"Hug": Release: February 12	6	21	—N/a	Outsider
2014	"Enamel": Release: August 27; Black Butler: Book of Circus theme song	7	5	—N/a	Non album song
2014	"White tree": Release: December 10	7	13	—N/a	Non album song
2015	"Hyoryu" (漂流): Release: November 25	16	—	—N/a	Non album song
2017	"Glass no Hitomi" (硝子の瞳): Release: January 18; Black Butler: Book of the Atlantic theme song	5	18	—N/a	Nomad
2017	"Butterfly Effect" (バタフライエフェクト): Release: May 10	13	65	—N/a	Nomad
2017	"Rasen no Yume" (螺旋のユメ): Release: August 2; Altair: A Record of Battles theme song	18	83	—N/a	Nomad
2020	"Delete": Release: March 4; Nanatsu no Taizai theme song	25	—	—N/a	Non album song
2020	"Hokiboshi" (ほうき星): Release: December 23	29	—	—N/a	Non album song
2021	"Star Forest": Release: May 15	15	—	—N/a	Non album song

Other singles

Title	Release	Notes
"Kaijou-Ban" (会場盤)	March 28, 2004	Sold exclusively at a show on this date. The tracks are "Watashi wa Ame" and "Ao", which were remixed for the album Renai.
"Tsūhan-ban" (通販盤)	April 4, 2004	Second version of the previous single, this time sold through mail order.
"Ryūtsū-ban" (流通盤)	June 6, 2004	Third version with a bonus track, "Neurosis Party". 110th place on Oricon.
"Sono Mirai e" (その未来へ)	March 10, 2019	Sold exclusively at the show Sid 15th Anniversary Grand Final at Yokohama Arena. Included in Ichiban Suki na Basho.
"Jiu no Kuchizuke" (慈雨のくちづけ)	July 18, 2021	Released digitally. Opening theme of Heaven Official's Blessing.

== Compilations ==
Title	Release	Oricon peak position
Side B complete collection~e.B~	August 13, 2008	10
Sid 10th Anniversary Best	January 16, 2013	1
Side B complete collection~e.B 2~	August 21, 2013	6
Side B complete collection~e.B 3~	August 21, 2013	7
Sid All Singles Best	January 13, 2016	6
Sid Anime Best 2008-2017	April 4, 2018	19
Story of Sid	September 2, 2026	19

== Videos ==
Only those listed on Oricon list.

Title	Release	Oricon peak position
paint pops	July 20, 2007	32
SIDNAD vol.1 ~film of "play"~	July 7, 2007	14
SIDNAD vol.2 ~CLIPS ONE~	May 14, 2008	7
SIDNAD Vol.3~TOUR 2008 Sentimental Macchiato~	October 15, 2008	5
SIDNAD Vol.4 ~TOUR 2009 hikari	February 10, 2010	3
SIDNAD Vol.5 ~CLIPS TWO~	July 28, 2010	7
SIDNAD Vol.6 ~LIVE 2010~	March 16, 2011	3
SIDNAD Vol.7 ~dead stock TOUR 2011~	October 5, 2011	2
SIDNAD Vol.8 ~TOUR 2012 M&W~	March 6, 2013	7
SIDNAD Vol.9 ~YOKOHAMA STADIUM~	December 11, 2013	2
SIDNAD Vol.10 ~CLIPS THREE~	April 9, 2014	9
SID 10th Anniversary TOUR 2013	September 3, 2014	2
SID TOUR 2014 OUTSIDER	March 18, 2015	13
SID Nippon Budokan 2017 "Yofuke to Ame to/Yoake to Kimi to" (SID 日本武道館 2017「夜更けと雨と/夜明けと君と」)	December 27, 2017	19
SID TOUR 2017「NOMAD」	July 25, 2018	28
Sid 15th Anniversary Grand Final at Yokohama Arena	July 24, 2019	18

== Collaborations ==
Soundtracks

- Kuroshitsuji Complete Sound BLACK BOX (August 26, 2009)
- Fullmetal Alchemist Final Best (July 28, 2010)
- Bleach Best Trax (April 25, 2012)
- Sadako 3D (October 31, 2013)

Tribute albums

- Luna Sea Memorial Cover Album, "Wish" (December 19, 2017)
- Fuck the Border Line, "Yasashii Higeki" (February 9, 2011)
- All Time Super Guest, "Justy" (August 15, 2011)
- L'Arc-en-Ciel Tribute, "Shout at the Devil" (June 13, 2012)
- Tribute of Mucc -en-, "Akatsuki Yami" (November 11, 2017)
- Parade III ~Respective Tracks of Buck-Tick~, "Jupiter" (January 29, 2020)
- Granrodeo Tribute Album "RODEO FREAK", "Infinite Love" (May 13, 2020)

As a producer

"Ash", LiSA (2020)
