= List of Black Butler episodes =

The cover of the first DVD compilation released by Aniplex; the characters featured are Sebastian Michaelis (left) and Ciel Phantomhive (right)

Black Butler is an anime television series adapted from Yana Toboso's manga series of the same. Directed by Toshiya Shinohara and produced by A-1 Pictures, Black Butler follows the adventures of Sebastian Michaelis, a demon butler who is obligated to serve Ciel Phantomhive, the young head of the Phantomhive noble family, due to a contract he made.

The anime adaptation was confirmed on July 11, 2008, by Gakken's Animedia magazine, and the official website of the anime began to stream a trailer of the anime on July 26, 2008. The series premiered on October 3, 2008, on Mainichi Broadcasting System and Chubu-Nippon Broadcasting. Two DVD compilations were released by Aniplex; the first compilation on January 21, 2009, and the second on February 25, 2009.

After the sixth episode, the anime begins to diverge from the storyline of the manga. The second season, which premiered on July 2, 2010, and concluded on September 17, 2010, continues this original storyline. The third season, Book of Circus (黒執事・サーカスの書, Kuroshitsuji: Sākasu no Sho), premiered on July 10, 2014, and concluded on September 12, 2014. Serving as a soft reboot of the anime, the series adapts the "Noah Ark Circus" arc from the manga while ignoring the anime-exclusive events of the previous two seasons. The series was followed by a two-episode OVA, Black Butler: Book of Murder, which adapts the "Phantomhive Manor Murders" arc. The first OVA was released in Japanese cinemas on October 25, and the second on November 15, 2014.

At Anime Expo 2023, Crunchyroll announced that a fourth season was in production. Titled Black Butler: Public School Arc and adapting the arc of the same name, it was directed by Kenjirō Okada and produced by CloverWorks, with Hiroyuki Yoshino handling series composition, Yumi Shimizu designing the characters, and Ryo Kawasaki composing the music. The season aired from April 13 to June 22, 2024, on Tokyo MX and other networks.

At Anime Expo 2024, it was announced that a fifth season, titled Black Butler: Emerald Witch Arc (黒執事 -緑の魔女編-, Kuroshitsuji Midori no Majo-hen), was in production. Licensed by Crunchyroll, it will be again directed by Kenjirō Okada and produced by CloverWorks. The season aired from April 5 to June 28, 2025, on Tokyo MX and other networks.

Three pieces of theme music are used for the first season. The opening theme song is "Monochrome no Kiss" performed by the Japanese rock band Sid, while the first ending theme song is "I'm Alive!" performed by American singer Becca. The second ending theme song, which began airing with episode 14, is "Lacrimosa" performed by Kalafina. Two singles containing the theme music and other tracks have been released; the single containing tracks from Sid was released on October 29, 2008, and the single from Becca was released on October 22, 2008. The third single containing tracks from Kalafina has a release date of March 4, 2009. For the second season, the opening theme song is "Shiver" performed by The Gazette, while the ending theme song is "Bird" performed by Yuya Matsushita, which released as a single in August 2010. The ending for episode 8 is "Kagayaku Sora no Shijima ni wa" performed by Kalafina. The opening theme song for Book of Circus is "Enamel" performed by Sid, while the ending theme song is "Aoki Tsuki Michite" performed by Akira. For the Public School Arc, the opening theme song is "Kyoshinsha no Parade -The Parade of Battlers-" performed by Otoha, while the ending theme song is "Shokuzai" performed by Sid. For the Emerald Witch Arc, the opening theme song is "Maisie" performed by Cö shu Nie featuring Hyde, while the ending theme song is "Waltz" performed by Ryūgūjō.

== Series overview ==
Season	Episodes	Originally released		
Season	Episodes	First released	Last released	Network
1	24	October 3, 2008	March 27, 2009	MBS, TBS, CBC
OVAs	7	September 30, 2009	May 25, 2011	—N/a
2	12	July 2, 2010	September 17, 2010	MBS, TBS, CBC
3	10	July 11, 2014	September 12, 2014	MBS, TBS, CBC
OVA	2	October 25, 2014	November 15, 2014	—N/a
Film		January 21, 2017		—N/a
4	11	April 13, 2024	June 22, 2024	Tokyo MX
5	13	April 5, 2025	June 28, 2025	Tokyo MX

== Episodes ==
=== Season 1 (2008–09) ===
No. overall	No. in season	Title	Directed by	Written by	Storyboarded by	Original release date	English air date
1	1	"His Butler, Able"; Transliteration: "Sono Shitsuji, Yūno" (Japanese: その執事、有能)	Hirofumi Ogura	Mari Okada	Toshiya Shinohara	October 3, 2008	January 11, 2011
Earl Ciel Phantomhive's butler, Sebastian Michaelis informs him that Damian, the head of Funtom, Ciel's confectionery toy company, is coming. Sebastian orders the household staff, Baldroy, Finnian, and Mey-Rin—the cook, the gardener, and the maid, respectively—to prepare for his arrival. Damian plays a board game with Ciel in which his character loses a leg and is incinerated. Damian is actually attempting to fraudulently acquire more money from Ciel. Similar to the scenario in the board game, Damian ends up breaking his leg, and Sebastian locks him in the oven to be cooked; Damian later limps away from the mansion as Ciel chuckles.
2	2	"His Butler, Strongest"; Transliteration: "Sono Shitsuji, Saikyō" (Japanese: その執事、最強)	Mika Iwamoto & Takahiro Okao	Mari Okada	Toshiya Shinohara	October 10, 2008	January 12, 2011
After a visit from Ciel's aunt Madame Red and Lau, Ciel is kidnapped for ransom by Azzurro Vanel, a drug dealer of an Italian mafia. Sebastian easily defeats his mob of underlings. He is shot several times but does not die, being a demon. Ciel takes off his eye patch, revealing the pentagram in his eye symbolizing the pact he made with Sebastian, and calls for his help, which enables Sebastian to save him.
3	3	"His Butler, Omnipotent"; Transliteration: "Sono Shitsuji, Bannō" (Japanese: その執事、万能)	Yasuhiro Geshi	Mari Okada	Minoru Ōhara	October 17, 2008	January 13, 2011
Grell Sutcliff is requested by Madame Red to train under Sebastian. It is revealed by Tanaka that the real Phantomhive estate burned down three years ago and was rebuilt. Ciel's parents died in the fire. Elizabeth Midford, Ciel's fiancée, visits. Elizabeth unhappily shatters Ciel's family ring when she sees that he isn't wearing the one she got him. Enraged but stopped by Sebastian, Ciel calms down and throws out the ring, declaring that he is head of the family with or without it. That night, to Ciel's surprise, Sebastian returns the ring to him, restored. He tells Sebastian to stay until he falls asleep, amusing the butler, who comments on the boy showing his weakness to him.
4	4	"His Butler, Capricious"; Transliteration: "Sono Shitsuji, Suikyō" (Japanese: その執事、酔狂)	Tomihiko Ōkubo	Yuka Yamada	Tomihiko Ōkubo	October 24, 2008	January 14, 2011
Jack the Ripper terrorizes the city of London. After receiving information from the Undertaker, they suspect the Viscount of Druitt. Sebastian, Ciel, and Lau attend the Viscount's ball to catch him, with Ciel disguised as a girl. At the ball, Ciel passes out, awaking to find himself being sold in an underground auction. When the Viscount removes Ciel's blindfold, Ciel calls for Sebastian. Sebastian saves Ciel, revealing that the pentagram in Ciel's eye is actually a mark that allows the demon to trace wherever his prey is. Jack the Ripper commits another murder, revealing that it was not the Viscount.
5	5	"His Butler, Chance Encounter"; Transliteration: "Sono Shitsuji, Kaikō" (Japanese: その執事、邂逅)	Ai Yoshimura	Mari Okada	Ai Yoshimura	October 31, 2008	January 17, 2011
At the house of the latest victim, Mary Jane Kelly, Ciel and Sebastian discover that the murderer is Madame Red and Grell, the latter a Grim Reaper. Madame Red attempts to kill Ciel but is unable to hurt her own nephew. Disappointed by her hesitation, Grell kills Madame Red and her life is played back, as Grim Reapers can see how one spent their life at the time of death. Madame Red had lost everyone she loved in life: her husband and unborn child; then her older sister and brother-in-law in the Phantomhive mansion fire. She decided to kill women who threw away the things she couldn't have, such as children. She met Grell, and they murdered prostitutes that had abortions. Ciel orders Sebastian to kill Grell.
6	6	"His Butler, At the Funeral"; Transliteration: "Sono Shitsuji, Sōsō" (Japanese: その執事、葬送)	Naokatsu Tsuda	Hiroyuki Yoshino	Toshifumi Takizawa	November 7, 2008	January 18, 2011
Before Sebastian can kill Grell, they are interrupted by William T. Spears, the administrator of the Grim Reapers. Spears takes a defeated Grell back to headquarters, ending Jack the Ripper's reign of terror. The following day, Ciel and Sebastian attend Madame Red's funeral, where Ciel recalls his childhood memories of her. Afterward, they tend to Mary Jane Kelly's tombstone, which Ciel had the Undertaker make to honor her. Sebastian remarks that Ciel's kindness is weakness, as he was afraid of killing his own aunt. Ciel responds that he knew Sebastian would protect him and he will not hesitate going forward. He asks Sebastian to promise never to betray him like Madame Red did; Sebastian agrees.
7	7	"His Butler, Merrymaking"; Transliteration: "Sono Shitsuji, Yūkyō" (Japanese: その執事、遊興)	Daisuke Tsukushi	Hiroyuki Yoshino	Minoru Ōhara	November 14, 2008	January 19, 2011
By the command of Queen Victoria, Ciel is to secure Houndsworth, a village controlled by a nobleman Henry Barrymore. The village is a dark and dreary place inhabited by a demon hound that kills bad dogs and people. Angela Blanc, Henry's servant, warns Ciel and Sebastian to leave, only for them to witness a boy's death caused by the demon hound. Finnian intervenes when a wrongly accused dog is sentenced to punishment, forcing him along with Bardroy, Mey-rin, Tanaka and Ciel to be captured. Sebastian reveals that Henry used a projection of a dog to make the villagers believe a demon hound existed so he could control the village.
8	8	"His Butler, Training"; Transliteration: "Sono Shitsuji, Chōkyō" (Japanese: その執事、調教)	Takahiro Okao & Mika Iwamoto	Mari Okada	Kazuo Takigawa	November 21, 2008	January 20, 2011
Henry is jailed but found dead with an arm torn off, revealing that there really is a demon hound. Finnian and Mey-Rin discover Angela's dominatrix personality, much to Finnian's dismay. When Angela goes missing, Ciel's servants venture out to search for her and encounter the real demon hound. Sebastian saves them. The demon hound is named Pluto and can take human form; Angela had taken him in and hidden him from her master. Angela asks Ciel to keep Pluto at the Phantomhive estate so Sebastian can train him, much to his chagrin, as Sebastian dislikes dogs. Before leaving, Sebastian suspiciously comments on Angela's ability to have "lesser beings" submit to her.
9	9	"His Butler, Phantom Image"; Transliteration: "Sono Shitsuji, Maboroshi Genzō" (Japanese: その執事、幻像)	Hirofumi Ogura	Yuka Yamada	Hirofumi Ogura	November 28, 2008	January 21, 2011
Ciel assigns his servants to take a photo of Sebastian with a camera that reveals what is most precious to the picture's subject that is deceased or not of this world. The camera requires one to stay still for ten seconds; Sebastian never does, evading their efforts effortlessly as he goes about the day's tasks. Exasperated, Ciel risks his own life to capture his photograph and Sebastian quips that Ciel could've just asked him for a photo. In the end, when Sebastian finds Ciel asleep, he takes a photo of Ciel, himself, and Pluto behind them, leading to a photo that confuses the servants. Sebastian remarks that it was an honor to learn that what Ciel most treasures is Sebastian himself.
10	10	"His Butler, on Ice"; Transliteration: "Sono Shitsuji, Hyōjō" (Japanese: その執事、氷上)	Tomihiko Ōkubo	Hiroyuki Yoshino	Tomihiko Ōkubo	December 5, 2008	January 24, 2011
Ciel and Sebastian visit a festival held on the frozen River Thames. They enter an ice-sculpting contest for the prize, a ring with a slice of blue diamond called the Hope Piece, which is important evidence in an investigation by Scotland Yard into the kidnappings of young girls. Sebastian creates an ice model of Noah's Ark, but the Hope Piece is lost in the river following a bombing incident. Meanwhile, Elizabeth discovers the Hope Piece in a toy ship she buys for Ciel's birthday.
11	11	"His Butler, However You Please"; Transliteration: "Sono Shitsuji, Ikayō" (Japanese: その執事、如何様)	Kentarō Suzuki	Mari Okada	Minoru Ōhara	December 12, 2008	January 25, 2011
It's Ciel's birthday, though he is unhappy, as his parents' death happened on his tenth birthday. Elizabeth becomes distraught when she can't find a good birthday gift for Ciel and encounters a strange dollmaker. It is reported that a series of kidnappings of girls are occurring in London. On his way to find Elizabeth, Ciel encounters Grell, learning that a puppeteer named Drocell Keinz is behind the kidnappings. Clues lead the two to a tower, where Grell is attacked by an army of dolls. Ciel finds Sebastian at the top of the tower.
12	12	"His Butler, Forlorn"; Transliteration: "Sono Shitsuji, Sekiryō" (Japanese: その執事、寂寥)	Ai Yoshimura	Mari Okada	Toshiya Shinohara & Ai Yoshimura	December 19, 2008	January 26, 2011
Ciel finds Elizabeth in the tower. Drocell is controlling her like a marionette and forces her to attack Ciel. Sebastian and Grell free Elizabeth and defeat Drocell, discovering he too is a doll being manipulated. The master of the tower states that someone unclean like Ciel must die. The trio discover the "master" is speaking through a doll; the actual master is hiding elsewhere, not present in the tower. Elizabeth and the rest of the Phantomhive estate celebrate Ciel's thirteenth birthday with a party, wishing to see him happy. The master of the tower is revealed to be Angela.
13	13	"His Butler, Freeloader"; Transliteration: "Sono Shitsuji, Isōrō" (Japanese: その執事、居候)	Naokatsu Tsuda	Yuka Yamada	Toshifumi Takizawa	December 26, 2008	January 27, 2011
In London, Ciel and Sebastian meet Prince Soma and his servant, Agni. After Prince Soma saves Ciel from thugs, he begrudgingly lets the two stay at the Phantomhive estate for their visit. Sebastian and Agni duel in a fencing match; when it ends in a draw, Ciel is shocked that Agni, a human, was able to equally match a demon, and wonders who he is. Sebastian is stunned when Agni convinces the normally wayward servants to help prepare supper. Prince Soma reveals that he is searching for his nursemaid, Mina, who was kidnapped from India by a wealthy Englishman. After Prince Soma goes to sleep, Sebastian witnesses Agni sneaking out and remarks that he knew that Agni would make a move.
14	14	"His Butler, Supremely Talented"; Transliteration: "Sono Shitsuji, Inō" (Japanese: その執事、異能)	Takahiro Okao & Mika Iwamoto	Yuka Yamada	Minoru Ōhara	January 16, 2009	January 28, 2011
Harold West, a wealthy businessman, is responsible for Agni's betrayal and Mina's wedlock, forcing Agni to commit crimes. Sebastian tells Prince Soma to face the truth that Agni would abandon him someday. Ciel preaches to never give up, using his parents' death as an example. West's goal is to gain a Royal Warrant for his curry restaurant by using Agni's talent to win the curry festival competition. Ciel decides to compete with his company Funtom as well. At the exhibition, Prince Soma finds Mina, who confesses that she purposefully escaped India and married West to free herself from the India's caste system. Queen Victoria, escorted by her butler, Ashe Landers, makes a grand entrance.
15	15	"His Butler, Competing"; Transliteration: "Sono Shitsuji, Kyōsō" (Japanese: その執事、競争)	Hirofumi Ogura	Hiroyuki Yoshino	Hitoyuki Matsui	January 23, 2009	January 31, 2011
Sebastian creates his curry with chocolate, Agni uses blue lobster, and a French chef uses a mysterious spice that was given to him by Angela. Sebastian wins with his curry buns and Funtom gains the Royal Warrant. However, the people who ate the curry with the mysterious spice become possessed and start attacking others. Sebastian and Agni fight them off and they are cured after a taste of Sebastian's curry buns because he put "kindness" into them (something Ciel finds ironic). With the competition over, Prince Soma and Agni bid farewell to Ciel and Sebastian and return to India.
16	16	"His Butler, in an Isolated Castle"; Transliteration: "Sono Shitsuji, Kojō" (Japanese: その執事、孤城)	Tomihiko Ōkubo	Rico Murakami	Tomihiko Ōkubo	January 30, 2009	February 1, 2011
Ciel is informed that the abandoned Ludlow Castle his estate owns is haunted by ghosts and the workers are too spooked to continue remodeling it into a hotel. At the castle, they encounter the ghosts of two princes who were assassinated four centuries ago, Edward V and his younger brother Richard, Duke of York. Ciel plays chess against Edward in order to win the castle but Edward wins and claims Sebastian as his prize. Edward has the skulls of his family on a chessboard, believing that the brothers can move on if the chessboard is complete. Ciel and Sebastian help him realize that he was simply holding a grudge against the man who killed them, preventing them from moving on. The princes are then able to depart for the afterlife.
17	17	"His Butler, Offering"; Transliteration: "Sono Shitsuji, Hōnō" (Japanese: その執事、奉納)	Tetsuo Ichimura	Mari Okada	Hiroyuki Morita	February 6, 2009	February 2, 2011
Ashe informs Ciel that an abandoned monastery in Preston, Lancashire has been taken over by a cult planning to overthrow the government. Ciel and Sebastian find out from Grell that the cinematic records were stolen too. At the monastery, Sebastian seduces a nun named Mathilda Simmons in order to learn that the cult uses a strange doomsday book to recruit new members and expose and "cleanse" them of their pasts. The trio witnesses a cleansing ceremony and Ciel recognizes the cult's symbol as the one branded on his body, remembering that he was also called "unclean" by the doll master that kidnapped Lizzie. He is kidnapped by Angela, who reveals herself to be an angel, and Sebastian and Grell give pursuit.
18	18	"His Butler, Transmitted"; Transliteration: "Sono Shitsuji, Tensō" (Japanese: その執事、転送)	Ai Yoshimura	Mari Okada	Minoru Ōhara	February 13, 2009	February 3, 2011
Angela uses the cinematic record to force Ciel recall his parents' murder. Sebastian and Grell go the Grim Reaper library to see Spears, who tells them that an Angel cannot change the past, only provide a changed impression of it. Angela attempts to "purify" Ciel of his dark past but his overwhelming hatred of his tormentors enables him to overcome her mirage. The Undertaker transports Sebastian, Grell, and Spears to Angela to incapacitate her. Angela destroys the monastery and vanishes as most of the cult members escape or die in the destruction. Believing the cult that killed his family is destroyed, Ciel tells Sebastian to take his soul. When Sebastian doesn't, Ciel realizes there are still others who are responsible for his family's demise.
19	19	"His Butler, Imprisoned"; Transliteration: "Sono Shitsuji, Nyūrō" (Japanese: その執事、入牢)	Naokatsu Tsuda	Hiroyuki Yoshino	Toshifumi Takizawa	February 20, 2009	February 4, 2011
The body of John Stanley, a man who worked under Queen Victoria, is found murdered in the River Thames. Ash wants Ciel to retrieve a secret item from Stanley's body. Ciel goes to Lau for information. Lau mentions a new drug, Lady Blanc circulating around. A large amount of the illicit drug is found in one of Ciel's warehouses and Lau and Ciel are both charged with drug trafficking. Lau knows what the secret item is and flees after framing Ciel for it. Ciel and Sebastian are arrested and separated. It is revealed that due to Lau's framing, orders for the arrest were given by Ash with the drugs planted as a pretext.
20	20	"His Butler, Escaping"; Transliteration: "Sono Shitsuji, Dassō" (Japanese: その執事、脱走)	Norihiko Nagahama	Hiroyuki Yoshino	Hiroyuki Shimazu	February 27, 2009	February 7, 2011
Sebastian is tortured in the Tower of London by Angela; she proposes that if he abandons Ciel, she will give him abundant souls to eat. Sebastian turns down the deal, stating that he only desires Ciel's soul. Scotland Yard inspector Fred Abberline helps Ciel with Stanley's case. Ciel frees Sebastian by summoning him, and they confront Lau for his betrayal on his junk. Lau reveals that the secret item was a letter exposing that Queen Victoria is trying to start a world war and mocks Ciel for still supporting her. As Lau goes to kill him, Abberline intercepts and takes a fatal blow for Ciel, dying in his arms. Sebastian kills Lau but Ciel, upset, slaps him for not saving him and letting Abberline sacrifice himself.
21	21	"His Butler, Engaging Servants"; Transliteration: "Sono Shitsuji, Koyō" (Japanese: その執事、雇傭)	Hirofumi Ogura	Yuka Yamada	Hirofumi Ogura	March 6, 2009	February 8, 2011
Ciel remains upset from Abberline's death and the revelation about Queen Victoria. His servants decide to try and cheer him up. The Phantomhive estate is attacked by enemies but Sebastian hides this from Ciel, who is teaching Elizabeth to play chess, and asks the servants to take care of it. The backgrounds of Mey-Rin, Bardroy, and Finnian are revealed: they are more than they appear on the surface. Mey-Rin was a sniper assassinating politicians; Bardroy was a skilled military soldier; Finnian was an imprisoned human test subject, experimented on and given superhuman strength. Sebastian recruited them for these strengths so they could protect Ciel under the guise of being servants. The servants drive the criminals away and Ciel, unaware of what just transpired, finally smiles in amusement when he sees them all looking rather disheveled.
22	22	"His Butler, Dissolution"; Transliteration: "Sono Shitsuji, Kaishō" (Japanese: その執事、解消)	Tetsuo Ichimura	Mari Okada	Minoru Ōhara	March 13, 2009	February 9, 2011
Ciel and Sebastian travel to the Exposition Universelle in Paris to meet Queen Victoria. At the top of the Eiffel Tower, Ciel is confronted by Queen Victoria, who reveals that Ashe, an angel, granted her youth. She wishes to kill Ciel and end his family to "cleanse" London. Ciel orders Sebastian to kill them but their duel causes debris to fall onto people below. Ciel calls off the duel to prevent people from getting hurt, angering Sebastian, who believes Ciel is retreating on his vow of revenge. The next morning, Ciel realizes that Sebastian has abandoned him. He attempts to make it back to London on his own but as a child, finds himself powerless as others get the best of him. Penniless, he spends the night cold and hungry on the docks. Ashe takes control of Pluto and sets the Phantomhive estate on fire.
23	23	"His Butler, Up In Flames"; Transliteration: "Sono Shitsuji, Enjō" (Japanese: その執事、炎上)	Tomihiko Ōkubo	Mari Okada	Tomihiko Ōkubo	March 20, 2009	February 10, 2011
Ciel stows away in a London-bound steamship, where he meets the Undertaker, who informs Ciel that he will die. The fire spreads in London and takes many lives. Ciel finds his servants in the burning streets, trying to tranquilize Pluto, who continues breathing fire onto the city. Ciel orders them to kill Pluto, surprising both them and Sebastian, who is watching. Ciel states that Pluto is no longer Pluto but a beast and Sebastian realizes that Ciel is still focused on revenge. Ashe is revealed to be the male version of Angela; they are the same angel. They try to convince Sebastian to join them but he goes after Ciel. Ciel heads to Windsor Castle, where he discovers Queen Victoria dead. The palace guards believe that he murdered her and shoot him. Sebastian appears and saves Ciel, stating that due to him, Sebastian will enjoy a delicious soul.
24	24	"His Butler, Fluent"; Transliteration: "Sono Shitsuji, Tōtō" (Japanese: その執事、滔滔)	Hirofumi Ogura	Mari Okada	Toshiya Shinohara	March 27, 2009	February 11, 2011
On the Tower Bridge, Ciel and Sebastian face the merged Angela/Ashe, who Ciel now knows was responsible for his family's brutal end. With Pluto dead and Grell, the Undertaker, and Spears cutting off the supply of souls that fuel Ashe's strength, Ashe is weakened. Sebastian reverts to his true demonic form to destroy Ashe. Satisfied, an injured Ciel, hanging off the edge, lets himself fall into the river. In the aftermath, a false Queen Victoria emerges to lead London. Ciel wakes up being ferried by Sebastian on a river, where he sees the cinematic record of his life and learns that his father knew of his impending death. They land at a ruined mansion, where Sebastian will take Ciel's soul. When he states that it may hurt and promises to be gentle, Ciel's final order is to make the process painful as proof that he lived. Sebastian agrees.

=== OVAs (2009–11) ===
No.	Title	Directed by	Written by	Storyboarded by	Original release date
1	"His Butler, On Stage"; Transliteration: "Sono Shitsuji, Kōgyō" (Japanese: その執事、興行)	Tetsuo Ichimura	Mari Okada	Toshiya Shinohara	September 30, 2009
Ciel and Sebastian celebrate the third anniversary of Funtom Company by hosting Hamlet as the play for an orphan charity. However, all the actors hired to perform in the play cannot arrive in town for another week due to a shipwreck. Since the play cannot be postponed, Sebastian is ordered by Ciel to make the play a success regardless. Sebastian rallies up the whole group together to be in the play, and they are visited by mostly every character in the series in this episode. Though the plot was ultimately altered, the play turns out, for the most part, a success.
2	"Ciel in Wonderland Part 1"; Transliteration: "Shieru・in・Wandārando (Zenpen)" (Japanese: シエル・イン・ワンダーランド（前編）)	Hirofumi Ogura	Rico Murakami	Hirofumi Ogura	October 27, 2010
One normal day at the manor, Ciel catches sight of Sebastian suddenly sprouting rabbit ears and a tail. He follows him into a hole in the floor, landing in an alternate dimension, where he encounters the other characters in different animal variations: the rat-like Elizabeth and her dodo-like maid Paula, his servants, Pluto the puppy, and the turtle-shelled Viscount of Druitt, who dances with him and spins him into the sky. Ciel lands in a palace, where he meets Prince Soma as the Duchess, his cook Agni, and Grell as the Cheshire Cat. After eating Agni's curry bun, Ciel becomes a giant and accidentally destroys the palace. Ciel next encounters the lizard-tailed Aberline, who offers him a hard candy. He eats it, hoping to turn back to normal, and instead shrieks in shock at the result.
3	"Welcome to the Phantomhive's"; Transliteration: "Fantomuhaivu-ka e Yōkoso" (Japanese: ファントムハイヴ家へようこそ)	Tomihiko Ōkubo	Tatsuto Higuchi	Tomihiko Ōkubo	November 24, 2010
This episode is filmed resembling a role-playing game. Elizabeth invites the main character, referred to as the lady, to join her at the Phantomhive ball. When the lady spills tea on her dress, Sebastian gives her a change of clothes: a dress belonging to Ciel's mother. It is revealed that the lady is an assassin sent to kill Sebastian and capture Ciel. The Viscount of Druitt kidnaps her; Grell helps Sebastian save her. Upon returning, the lady attempts to attack a sleeping Ciel. Sebastian, already knowing her true identity, stops her. At the ball, everyone gives the lady a surprise birthday party and Sebastian tells her that he'll spare her but won't hesitate to kill her if she goes after Ciel again. After the ball, the lady leaves with Elizabeth and throws her knife out onto the road, displaying her change of heart.
4	"Making of Kuroshitsuji II"	Shinobu Sasaki	Toshizo Nemoto	Shinobu Sasaki	January 26, 2011
This episode is filmed meta style, with the characters acting like actors in the real world, filming "Black Butler." They give a behind-the-scenes look at the debut of "Black Butler", which became globally famous. Ciel, Sebastian, and the rest of the characters return for the sequel. Use of the green screen effect is explained during Sebastian and Grell's battle scenes in London. When Claude destroys the set after being disappointed with the script, Ciel is rescued from falling debris by Sebastian, who fractures his ankle in the process but stubbornly continues filming. There is never-before-seen footage of the series shown and a "trailer" for the "Black Butler" sequel, with surprising twists and parodies.
5	"Ciel in Wonderland Part 2"; Transliteration: "Shieru・in・Wandārando (Kōhen)" (Japanese: シエル・イン・ワンダーランド（後編）)	Hirofumi Ogura	Rico Murakami	Hirofumi Ogura	February 23, 2011
Ciel, now shrunken, meets a caterpillar Lau and a mushroom-headed Ran-Mao. The two revert Ciel to his normal size and drop him into the forest, where Grell guides Ciel toward Sebastian. Ciel encounters the Undertaker as the Mad Hatter, William T. Spears as the March Hare, and Ronald Knox as the Dormouse at their tea party. He is then taken to the castle where Madame Red is the Queen of Hearts; she sentences him to death as Ciel's acquaintances throughout the series all accuse him of the pain he has caused them in real life. Ciel is filled with guilt, implying that he feels this in real life. He calls out for Sebastian, who saves him; it is revealed that Sebastian is actually reading a bedtime story to Ciel's soulless body, implying that this took place before the first episode of season two.
6	"The Tale of Will the Shinigami"; Transliteration: "Shinigami Wiru no Monogatari" (Japanese: 死神ウィルの物語)	Takayuki Tanaka	Toshizo Nemoto	Takayuki Tanaka	April 27, 2011
William T. Spears and Grell are chosen to train new grim reaper recruits to be admitted into the dispatch association. While touring the building, the two explain the rules of the upcoming exam. The last part of the exam requires all grim students to find a partner and pass the given challenges. Only those who fully complete the exam can become a full-fledged grim reaper. While passing a glance over the nervous students, William recalls back to the time when he was a young rookie grim reapers, back to the time when he ironically challenged the grim reaper exam with Grell as his partner. They were given one month to track down a novelist named Thomas Wallace conclude whether or not he should die. They reveal themselves as grim reapers to Thomas, however he mistakes them for actors. Inspired, Thomas begins to write a fictional novel about the romance between a grim reaper and a maiden. It is realized that the date of publication is the same of the execution. Grell disagrees with William about sentencing Thomas to death, after seeing how successful his novel might become. Thomas is run over a passing carriage, and William arrives to collect his soul. While absorbing the cinematic record into his death scythe, Thomas fights for his life, which causes the cinematic record to flow inside William. Grell saves William from being consumed, and the two work together to absorb the cinematic record. It is then that the two become full-fledged grim reapers.
7	"Spider's Intention"; Transliteration: "Kumo no Ito" (Japanese: 蜘蛛の意図)	Shinobu Sasaki	Mari Okada	Shinobu Sasaki	May 25, 2011
Alois Trancy frees a butterfly from a spiderweb and breaks off one of its wings, so that it cannot escape him. He orders Claude to fill his bedroom with flowers and an insect cage to keep the butterfly in. The story is shown in the views of the servant triplets, Hannah, and Claude. In the end, the butterfly dies and Alois tries to cremate it, but ends up setting his room alight and begs Claude not to go in, in fear that Claude will burn and leave him. Alois dreams of being trapped in a spiderweb and describing himself as a butterfly with no wings.

=== Season 2 (2010) ===
No. overall	No. in season	Title	Directed by	Written by	Storyboarded by	Original release date
25	1	"Clawed Butler"; Transliteration: "Kuro Shitsuji" (Japanese: クロ執事)	Shinobu Sasaki	Mari Okada	Hirofumi Ogura	July 2, 2010
Earl Alois Trancy's butler, Claude Faustus, announces that his uncle, the Viscount of Druitt, and a priest are coming for a visit because his uncle suspects Alois' legitimacy as the former head's son. Alois tells them how he was kidnapped at birth and sent into slavery at a village. He was the only survivor of a plague that killed the village; his father found him but died of an infection. During a storm, a cloaked man arrives and asks for shelter. In the basement, he targets a special black tea box, said to help undergo an aromatherapy of darkness. The man is Sebastian, hiding the lifeless body of Earl Ciel in his suitcase. Sebastian escapes; the tea box is revealed to contain Ciel's family heirloom ring. Sebastian places it on Ciel's finger and says it is time to wake up.
26	2	"Solo Butler"; Transliteration: "Soroshitsuji" (Japanese: 単執事)	Ai Yoshimura	Rico Murakami	Ai Yoshimura	July 9, 2010
Ciel, now reawakened, attends the grand opening of a bridge. Elizabeth wishes to seek a legendary white stag; Ciel doesn't want to but agrees, realizing he should keep her happy and maintain a positive standing in high society. When a downpour occurs, Elizabeth becomes trapped in the river with the old dam about to burst. Ciel orders Sebastian to stop the flood; to his shock, Sebastian breaks the dam instead, causing water to flood them. When Ciel wakes up, Sebastian explains that he worked with the servants and Lau and Ran-Mao to change the river's shape to prevent future floods. The group discovers the white stag is a figure etched into the hill.
27	3	"Wench Butler"; Transliteration: "Merōshitsuji" (Japanese: 女郎執事)	Tetsuya Endo	Tatsuto Higuchi	Hiroshi Matsuzono	July 16, 2010
Ciel investigates incidents of brides randomly combusting into flame in London. The culprit is wedding photographer Turner's wife Margaret, who sprinkles magnesium powder, likened to the powder used in flash pans for photography, in the air and ignites it with her camera flash. She is jealous of the newlyweds' love. When Sebastian and the Grim Reaper, Grell Sutcliff stop her, she bursts into flames, stating that a man (Claude) told her to do this. Ciel learns that the Trancy estate also works undercover for Queen Victoria, investigating cases like the Phantomhives do. Three years ago, the head of the Trancys died, leaving his son, Alois Trancy, to take over as Earl.
28	4	"Terrorist Butler"; Transliteration: "Teroshitsuji" (Japanese: テロ執事)	Takayuki Tanaka	Mari Okada & Masahiro Yokotani	Takayuki Tanaka	July 23, 2010
Ciel and Sebastian board a train to investigate a kidnapping case. Sebastian sees Claude aboard but keeps this from Ciel. There is a murderer being transferred aboard by police. The officer is Fred Aberline's twin brother though Ciel has no recollection of Aberline. Ciel and Sebastian stop the kidnapping but learn that the kidnapper planted a bomb in the train, which is also headed for a broken bridge. Sebastian amends each crisis by getting rid of the kidnapper, the murderer, the bomb, and halting the train. Claude invites Sebastian to the Trancy estate, knowing Ciel wants to investigate them. He remarks to a suspicious Sebastian that the visit will help resolve Ciel's revenge.
29	5	"Beacon Butler"; Transliteration: "Noroshitsuji" (Japanese: 狼煙執事)	Tomihiko Ōkubo	Toshizo Nemoto	Tomihiko Ōkubo	July 30, 2010
Before the costume ball at the Trancy estate, Sebastian warns Prince Soma and Agni that Ciel has lost his memory and he has asked those close to Ciel to pretend everything is normal. Ciel feels uneasy in the Trancy mansion. One of the maids acts strange and steals Ciel's eye patch. Ciel chases her into the cellar, where he becomes nauseous and hallucinates events of the first episode, when Sebastian had visited for the tea. He flees into the woods, having figured out that the maid is really Alois in costume. Alois wants Ciel and threatens to kill everyone at the ball if Ciel does not give himself up. Ciel commands Sebastian to protect him.
30	6	"Bedewed Butler"; Transliteration: "Yoroshitsuji" (Japanese: 夜露執事)	Takahiro Harada	Toshizo Nemoto	Hirofumi Ogura	August 6, 2010
Sebastian defeats Alois' servant triplets. At the estate, Hannah Annafellows plays the armonica and takes control of the guests with her music. Sebastian saves them using a glass harp. It is revealed that Sebastian could not devour Ciel's soul because Claude took his soul first but could not use it without having Ciel's body. Having lost his memories and with the evil cult destroyed, Ciel no longer has any hatred or drive for revenge. Sebastian decides that Ciel needs a second revenge in order to become his Ciel again. The butlers strike a deal in which Alois will be the new target of Ciel's revenge, and Sebastian and Claude will battle for who will have Ciel's soul.
31	7	"Deathly Butler"; Transliteration: "Koroshitsuji" (Japanese: 殺執事)	Shunichi Yoshizawa	Tatsuto Higuchi	Shunichi Yoshizawa	August 13, 2010
Sebastian and Ciel are privately invited to the Trancy estate. After Sebastian says Alois is behind the murder of his parents, Ciel decides to kill Alois. Alois has prepared an enormous chessboard for Sebastian and Claude to battle on while they watch. As Claude gains the upper hand, the butlers find that Ciel has stabbed Alois. Alois insists that both boys are being tricked by the demons. Claude stops Ciel, but Ciel slaps him with his bleeding hand, inadvertently giving Claude a taste of his blood. To Sebastian's dismay, Claude is entranced, realizing Sebastian is obsessed with Ciel's soul because although he dwells in darkness, his soul is pure and surprisingly untainted. Claude ignores Alois, who collapses from his wound.
32	8	"Divulging Butler"; Transliteration: "Toroshitsuji" (Japanese: 吐露執事)	Shinobu Sasaki	Mari Okada	Shinobu Sasaki	August 20, 2010
Bandaged but injured, Alois notes that after tasting Ciel's blood, Claude no longer seems enamoured with Alois. Desperate for Claude's attention again, he travels to see Ciel. His true past is revealed: his real name is Jim Macken and he had a little brother named Luka. One night, Alois discovered the entire village dead, including Luka, which devastates him. He was brought to the previous Trancy head as a sex slave, where he summoned Claude and seduced Trancy to win the inheritance. It was Sebastian who massacred the village as an order from a former master. Learning that Sebastian is unusually attached to Ciel, Alois plans to take Ciel from him to make him suffer. In the present, Claude kills Alois, remarking that he has no appetite for a soul like his but still has a use for it.
33	9	"Hollow Butler"; Transliteration: "Uroshitsuji" (Japanese: 虚執事)	Yoshihisa Matsumoto	Mari Okada	Yoshihisa Matsumoto	August 27, 2010
Ciel is tasked with solving another crime. When they are attacked, Sebastian asks Ciel to remain hidden in a crate while he battles William T. Spears and Ronald Knox, who are investigating Alois' soul. Ciel gets flashes of his past memories and is bothered by Alois' words about them being tricked by the demons. Angry that Sebastian is hiding something, Ciel acts against his orders and flees but is immediately framed by Hannah, who tells police that Ciel is Alois. Ciel is tortured at an asylum, where Claude uses hypnosis to confuse him into thinking Alois' memories are his own, then puts Alois' ring onto Ciel's finger. By the time Sebastian arrives, Ciel believes it was Sebastian who killed his parents and Claude is his butler. Sebastian resolves to get rid of Claude.
34	10	"Zero Butler"; Transliteration: "Zeroshitsuji" (Japanese: 零執事)	Takayuki Tanaka	Mari Okada	Takayuki Tanaka	September 3, 2010
Claude attempts to convince Ciel to break his contract with Sebastian and forge a new one with him but Ciel refuses, unable to forget Sebastian. Sebastian goes to Alois's village and learns that Luka was responsible for the massacre: he made a contract with a demon to make his older brother's wish of the village's destruction come true as revenge for the village treating them poorly; then died when his soul was eaten upon the contract's completion. When Ciel is with Hannah, she opens her mouth and reveals a gaping abyss. Inside, Ciel sees Alois's eye and faints from terror. As Sebastian and Claude break their deal, Ciel suddenly calls for Sebastian, threatening to jump from a clock tower. Sebastian realizes that Alois' soul has taken control of Ciel's body. Hannah says that her master has returned.
35	11	"Crossroads Butler"; Transliteration: "Kiroshitsuji" (Japanese: 岐路執事)	Tomihiko Ōkubo	Mari Okada	Tomihiko Ōkubo	September 10, 2010
Hannah puts Sebastian and Claude in a hedge maze that is actually a labyrinth of Alois' mind; they must answer his questions to reach him at the tower. Ciel's memories slowly return; when he remembers that his revenge is in fact complete, the labyrinth shifts to reflect his mind. He asks why Sebastian did not eat his soul; Sebastian answers that he'd lost the arm with the contract's seal in the battle; this provided Claude an opportunity to steal Ciel's soul. It is revealed that the demon Luka contracted with was Hannah, who came to love Luka and Alois. Ciel orders Sebastian to eat his soul as promised but Alois snatches back his body, saying he has found people who love him. He makes a contract with Hannah, telling Claude he had only wanted Claude's love.
36	12	"Black Butler"; Transliteration: "Kuroshitsuji" (Japanese: 黒執事)	Shinobu Sasaki	Mari Okada	Hirofumi Ogura	September 17, 2010
As part of Alois' contract, Sebastian and Claude are to duel; the winner will claim Ciel's soul. Sebastian wins, killing Claude. Hannah jumps into the ocean with Ciel, revealing something that causes Sebastian to try to kill Ciel as soon as he awakens. Hannah dies alongside Claude, reuniting them with Alois and Luka forever. Some time later, Ciel awakens back home with red eyes like Sebastian. He sends farewell gifts to his friends, dismisses his servants, and leaves the city with Sebastian. It is revealed that in the contract, Alois asked that Hannah make Ciel's soul unattainable for either butler. She did this by causing Ciel to be reborn as a demon, which is why Sebastian tried to kill him. As a result, Sebastian cannot consume Ciel's soul yet is still bound by their contract. Sebastian affirms his service to Ciel as he carries him off a cliff into the underworld.

=== Season 3: Book of Circus (2014) ===
No. overall	No. in season	Title	Directed by	Written by	Storyboarded by	Original release date
37	1	"His Butler, Presenting"; Transliteration: "Sono Shitsuji, Hirō" (Japanese: その執事, 披露)	Noriyuki Abe	Yana Toboso	Noriyuki Abe	July 11, 2014
A new day begins at the Phantomhive Estate and guests are expected for a business meeting that evening. Lau and Ran-Mao arrive with Cedric Brandel, a businessman who secretly intends to have Ciel killed as Ciel's position as the Queen's guard dog is interfering with his illegal arms trade. However, just when he orders his men to attack, Cedric learns that Sebastian had already dealt with all of them and is killed by the butler. Lau delivers an invitation for the Circus that has just arrived in the city. Sebastian puts Ciel to sleep, eagerly awaiting the day when he will claim his master's soul.
38	2	"His Butler, Taking the Stage"; Transliteration: "Sono Shitsuji, Danjō" (Japanese: その執事, 檀上)	Noriyuki Abe	Hiroyuki Yoshino	Noriyuki Abe	July 18, 2014
The Queen orders Ciel to investigate the circus' possible connection with missing children as children have vanished from every town the circus has visited. Ciel and Sebastian attend the circus and Sebastian volunteers for one of the acts. A commotion is caused when he finds himself enticed, then attacked, by the tiger. Joker, the ringleader, insists that Sebastian be examined by their doctor. The butler's curiosity is piqued when he finds that many of the performers wear prosthetic limbs made by the doctor. Sebastian asks Joker for a job, and upon being accepted, agrees to return the next day with an "acquaintance" who also wishes to join. Sebastian then tries to investigate the circus further but the snake charmer Snake stops him.
39	3	"His Butler, Hired"; Transliteration: "Sono Shitsuji, Saiyō" (Japanese: その執事、採用)	Harume Kosaka	Hiroyuki Yoshino	Yasuto Nishikata	July 25, 2014
After a brief reunion with Soma and Agni, Sebastian and Ciel return to the circus in the next day to become part of it. But Ciel's abilities are yet to prove, and he is forced to participate in two trials, one of throwing knives and another of tightrope walking, succeeding on both with Sebastian's help. However, once accepted into the circus, the duo discover, much to their surprise, that William T. Spears is also working there undercover, and realize that there is something truly suspicious occurring in Noah's Ark Circus, to the point of having a Grim Reaper personally investigating it.
40	4	"His Butler, Coworker"; Transliteration: "Sono Shitsuji, Dōryō" (Japanese: その執事、同僚)	Takayuki Tanaka	Hiroyuki Yoshino	Takayuki Tanaka	August 1, 2014
Ciel and Sebastian begin their undercover job at the circus. William reveals that in the next days, a huge number of souls are to be collected at the circus. While Ciel is paired with another recruit called "Freckles", Sebastian is assigned to sleep in the same tent as William, much to each other's dismay. Later at night, the first-string circus members kidnap a young child in the city, killing all the police officers who intervene. At the circus, the rougher environment take a toll on Ciel's body, but he vows to figure out the truth behind the circus as soon as possible.
41	5	"His Butler, Takes Flight"; Transliteration: "Sono Shitsuji, Hishō" (Japanese: その執事、飛翔)	Shin'ichi Masaki	Yuka Miyata	Miyana Okita	August 8, 2014
Ciel and Sebastian intend to look for clues in the first-string members' tents while they are performing. However, Ciel is left alone when Sebastian and William are summoned to replace injured artists. He finds a mysterious symbol of status in old photos and a letter addressed to Joker that states Ciel's name and biographical information. Ciel is saved from a snake by Doll, one of the main performers, and learns that she is in fact his roommate Freckles. He has a sudden asthma attack, brought on by the abrupt stress and cold. Though bedridden, he sends Sebastian to investigate further. Snake discovers that the duo is spying on them and Joker decides to consult with "Father" before taking action.
42	6	"His Butler, Liaison"; Transliteration: "Sono Shitsuji, Kōshō" (Japanese: その執事、交渉)	Mitsutaka Noshitani	Ichirō Ōkouchi	Shinichi Omata	August 15, 2014
Sick and delirious, Ciel has nightmares of his past. Beast, one of the circus members, attempts to convince Joker to flee with her but he claims that they can't run away from their leader. Knowing her feelings for Joker are unrequited, Sebastian seduces Beast and gets her to tell him the name of their leader. The next day, he leaves the circus with Ciel, certain they have the information they need. Once they return home, Soma and Agni condemn Sebastian for not taking care of Ciel while sick and convince him to let him rest for the day. The circus realizes that Ciel, Sebastian, and William are all gone, and fear that their plans are compromised.
43	7	"His Butler, Careful Tending"; Transliteration: "Sono Shitsuji, Buyō" (Japanese: その執事、撫養)	Hitomi Ezoe	Hiroyuki Yoshino	Kiyoko Sayama	August 22, 2014
Joker meets with his adoptive father, Baron Kelvin, and upon telling him about Ciel and Sebastian, the Baron is eager to meet them, ordering Joker to prepare a banquet. After recovering, Ciel leaves with Sebastian to confront the Baron. They are welcomed by Joker, who now knows who Ciel is. During the banquet, the Baron has Joker perform a gruesome show where the brainwashed children are brutally killed. When one of the missing children are found among them, Ciel goes to kill the Baron but he reveals that he has one more thing to show him. Sebastian and Ciel are shocked upon finding a room built exactly like the one where Ciel was tortured by the cult after his parents' death, where he first summoned Sebastian.
44	8	"His Butler, Sneering"; Transliteration: "Sono Shitsuji, Chōshō" (Japanese: その執事、嘲笑)	Harume Kosaka	Hiroyuki Yoshino	Toshifumi Takizawa	August 29, 2014
Kelvin reveals that he met Ciel and his father years before the tragedy that befell Ciel's family. He became obsessed with the Phantomhives' beauty and felt that he was too ugly to be worthy of them. Kelvin underwent plastic surgery; when he learned that Ciel survived the attack on his family, he began gathering disabled children in hopes of recreating that night for Ciel. Ciel shoots the Baron dead, and Joker moves to attack him only to have his arm cut off by Sebastian. Joker reveals that the circus members were sent to the Phantomhive estate in order to capture Ciel but the earl has no fear. As expected, Mey-Rin, Baldroy, Finnian and Tanaka are too powerful and skillfully dispose of the members.
45	9	"His Butler, Serene"; Transliteration: "Sono Shitsuji, Shōyō" (Japanese: その執事、従容)	Tsuyoshi Tobita	Hiroyuki Yoshino	Kiyoko Sayama	September 5, 2014
As the other Phantomhive servants kill the circus members, Grell collects their souls. At the Kelvin estate, the circus doctor reveals that the prosthetic limbs he developed are manufactured using the bones of the children kidnapped by the circus. The members did not know this and Joker suffers a mental breakdown when he learns what his artificial limb truly is. When the doctor kills another child before Ciel, he orders Sebastian to kill him, and (opposing the Queen's orders to rescue the children alive) commands his butler to burn down the mansion, killing the captive children as well.
46	10	"His Butler, Fulfilling His Duty"; Transliteration: "Sono Shitsuji, Suikou" (Japanese: その執事、遂行)	Tomokazu Tokoro	Hiroyuki Yoshino	Noriyuki Abe	September 12, 2014
As Joker dies from blood loss, he reminisces about how he and his friends were rescued from the slums by the Baron and swore to serve him to protect the other orphans under his care. Doll arrives at the burning mansion for Joker; she attacks Ciel and is apparently killed by Sebastian. Emissaries from the Queen watch the scene but decide to not report Ciel's decision to sacrifice the captive children. On the way to Kelvin's orphanage, Ciel reveals that he ordered the deaths of the children knowing that they would never have their minds restored again. Upon arriving, the two learn that the orphanage was abandoned years before, and the circus members were deceived by the Baron into working for him. Sebastian states that humans' willingness strive for a better future despite the odds is what makes them interesting.

=== OVA: Book of Murder (2014) ===
No. overall	No. in OVA	Title	Directed by	Written by	Storyboarded by	Original release date
46.25	1	"Book of Murder Part 1"; Transliteration: "Kuro Shitsuji: Ue" (Japanese: 黒執事:上)	Ayako Kono, Ken Andou & Mitsutaka Noshitani	Hiroyuki Yoshino	Kazunori Mizuno, Tomokazu Tokoro & Yukio Nishimoto	October 25, 2014
The Queen decides to test Ciel's loyalty, believing he omitted something from his report about the killed captive children from Noah's Ark Circus. Her butlers order that a banquet be held at the Phantomhive mansion for a German banker, Lord Georg von Siemens. After the banquet, Siemens is found murdered in his guest room. Everyone has an alibi except Ciel, who is then confined to one of his guests – Arthur Conan Doyle, a novice writer Ciel is a fan of. That night, someone kills Sebastian and another guest is found dead in the morning. Doyle surmises that three different people committed the murders, since all three could not have been done by one person. Just as they begin to wonder if there may be a person from the outside attacking them, a mysterious reverend Jeremy Rathborne arrives.
46.75	2	"Book of Murder Part 2"; Transliteration: "Kuro Shitsuji: Shita" (Japanese: 黒執事:下)	Noriyuki Abe, Haruna Kosaka & Mitsutaka Noshitani	Hiroyuki Yoshino	Noriyuki Abe, Takayuki Tanaka & Yukio Nishimoto	November 15, 2014
Sebastian had asked Rathborne to come investigate. One of the murders was done by a snake trained to hunt down Ciel's scent; it was sent by Snake from Noah's Ark Circus to avenge his friends. Siemens had faked his death as a joke but was killed after by Woodley, who wanted to frame Ciel to prevent him from destroying his diamond business. The case is closed but Arthur Conan Doyle notices the inconsistencies and learns the truth: Rathborne is Sebastian in disguise and they'd known the culprit all along – Earl Grey, the Queen's butler, whom the Queen had sent to kill Siemens via the banquet in order to halt Germany's financial growth, and at the same time, jokingly frame Ciel as punishment for the accident with Noah's Ark Circus and test whether he still had the guts for the job as her Guard Dog. Ciel and Sebastian framed Woodley, who was corrupt anyway. This experience influences Doyle and sets off his career. At the end, Ciel invites Snake to live in the Phantomhive manor to win his trust and prevent another attempt on Ciel's life.

=== Film: Book of the Atlantic (2017) ===
Title	Directed by (Note: Although Noriyuki Abe is officially credited as the film's director, the listed credits below are unit directors (演出), which in this case are assigned to episode-length sections of the film)	Written by	Storyboarded by	Original release date
Black Butler: Book of the Atlantic	Noriyuki Abe, Ayako Kouno, Kazunori Mizuno, Yasuhito Nishikata, Takayuki Tanaka & Tsuyoshi Tobita	Hiroyuki Yoshino	Kazunori Mizuno, Noriyuki Abe, Shinichi Omata, Takayuki Tanaka & Yasuto Nishikata	January 21, 2017
Ciel boarded the luxury passenger ship Campania, accompanied by his servants Sebastian and Snake. Tagging along with the Midford family, Earl Phantomhive was there to investigate a sinister case of illegal human experimentation, however. A shady doctor appeared to be the mastermind, as he demonstrated to the Aurora Society how he had been bringing the deceased back to life. The reanimated dead were not quite human however, as what was left of the people on board were about to find out.

=== Season 4: Public School Arc (2024) ===
No. overall	No. in season	Title	Directed by	Written by	Storyboarded by	Original release date
47	1	"His Butler, at School"; Transliteration: "Sono Shitsuji, Tōkō" (Japanese: その執事、登校)	Kenjirō Okada	Hiroyuki Yoshino	Kenjirō Okada	April 13, 2024
Ciel enrolls in the prestigious Weston College following a request from the Queen to investigate the disappearance of several students, including Derrick Arden, son of the Queen's cousin. The school is divided into four dorms (Houses): Scarlet Fox, for the sons of the wealthy, Sapphire Owl, for students with academic merit, Green Lion, for those who excel in sports, and Violet Wolf, for art students. Sebastian comes with as a teacher and supervisor of the Sapphire Owl Dorm, where Ciel is put. Ciel meets the four prefects of Weston College, the school's most notable students, each in charge of a different dorm. He attempts to visit Derrick at Violet Wolf's dorm but is driven away. He also attempts to meet the elusive, mysterious headmaster but hears from Johann Agares, the vice principal, that the headmaster only ever meets with the prefects. Ciel decides to gain favor with the prefects in order to reach the headmaster.
48	2	"His Butler, in Disguise"; Transliteration: "Sono Shitsuji, Gisō" (Japanese: その執事、偽装)	Shōgo Ono	Hiroyuki Yoshino	Hiroyuki Oshima	April 20, 2024
Ciel's efforts to earn praise from his peers with Sebastian's help bring him the attention of the four prefects, who invite him for tea. Edgar Redmond, Scarlet Fox's prefect, sends his student fag Maurice Cole, to deliver the invitation, but Maurice purposely gives Ciel the wrong time, causing him to be late. This leads to him being shunned by the prefects. Ciel and Sebastian investigate Maurice and discover that he pushes most of his fag duties to his underclassmen, among other misdeeds. Ciel decides that he needs to infiltrate a spy into the Scarlet Fox Dorm. He convinces Soma to enroll in Weston College and take on the role.
49	3	"His Butler, Plotting"; Transliteration: "Sono Shitsuji, Sakubō" (Japanese: その執事、策謀)	Yukiko Imai	Hiroyuki Yoshino	Yukiko Imai	April 27, 2024
Soma not only catches Maurice sending out task cards to underclassmen but also uncovers his other secret. In the art room, Ciel confronts him about his misdeeds and Maurice calls in his lackeys to attack him. Green Lion's prefect, Herman Greenhill, and his student fag, Edward Midford, stop them. Ciel had attached strings to the paintings and connected them to gramophones at the Swan Gazebo, the prefects' meeting place. Thus, the prefects heard everything, and Edgar relieves Maurice of his position. Ciel also reveals Maurice's other secret to the school, spreading photos of his true appearance that he hides with makeup to be "the prettiest boy in school." Having uncovered the truth about Maurice, Ciel gains the prefects' favor and becomes fag to Clayton, the Sapphire Owl prefect's fag.
50	4	"His Butler, Colluding"; Transliteration: "Sono Shitsuji, Dangō" (Japanese: その執事、談合)	Yasuo Ejima	Michiko Yokote	Kazuki Ōhashi	May 4, 2024
Having joined the prefects' social circle, Ciel inquires about Derrick. Their reaction makes him and Sebastian suspect that they're hiding something about his disappearance. Edward, the brother of Elizabeth, Ciel's betrothed, figures that Ciel is really here as the Queen's watchdog, not a student. Ciel and Sebastian learn from the other students that Derrick and a few other students were suddenly transferred to the Violet Wolf dorm six months ago by the principal. Out of options, Ciel and Sebastian cause a fire at Violet Wolf's dorm to force the students to evacuate, hoping to draw Derrick out.
51	5	"His Butler, Gaining Admittance"; Transliteration: "Sono Shitsuji, Nyūjō" (Japanese: その執事、入場)	Kakushi Ifuku	Sumika Hayakawa	Kakushi Ifuku	May 11, 2024
The students evacuate Violet Wolf's dorm but neither Derrick nor the other missing students are among them; they were never at the dorm to begin with. Looking for another way to reach the principal, Ciel learns that every year, the principal invites the most distinguished student from the upcoming annual cricket tournament to the special midnight tea meeting. Sebastian arranges for Ciel to join Sapphire Owl's cricket team. During the opening ceremony, Ciel meets Elizabeth and her parents. Her father, Alexis, reminisces that Sapphire Owl won the tournament only once, back when he was a student. It is revealed that during that time, Sapphire Owl's prefect was none other than Ciel's father, Vincent Phantomhive.
52	6	"His Butler, Scheming"; Transliteration: "Sono Shitsuji, Sakudō" (Japanese: その執事、策動)	Shōgo Ono	Hiroyuki Yoshino	Ryou Kodama	May 18, 2024
Dietrich, a German exchange student and Green Lion's prefect, had lost a bet to Vincent after Sapphire Owl won the Cricket tournament. Having lost, Dietrich is asked by Vincent to be his subordinate for life, leaving him sputtering. In the present, Sapphire Owl's first match is against Scarlet Fox, who forfeits due to food poisoning caused by Sebastian. Sapphire Owl makes it to the final match against Green Lion, managing to always hit the ball thanks to Sebastian sending musical signals through the orchestra he is leading. Just then, the principal finally arrives to watch the match, causing a commotion. Sebastian rushes to capture him in order to inquire about the missing students.
53	7	"His Butler, Final Match"; Transliteration: "Sono Shitsuji, Kesshō" (Japanese: その執事、決勝)	Ryou Kodama	Michiko Yokote	Ryou Kodama	May 25, 2024
With Sebastian absent, the Sapphire Owl team resorts to their other underhanded tactics devised by Ciel as backups. Sebastian keeps looking for the principal, but fails, as he is always one step ahead. When he drops all pretenses and attacks, the principal vanishes before his eyes, making the demon realize that they are not dealing with a human. Green Lion keeps behind Sapphire Owl in the score but closes the gap near the end of the game. In the last throw, Ciel puts himself in harm's way to distract Herman and seize victory, repeating his father's feat of having Sapphire Owl win the Cricket tournament.
54	8	"His Butler, Locking Up"; Transliteration: "Sono Shitsuji, Sejō" (Japanese: その執事、施錠)	Akihisa Shibata & Ryouta Karasawa	Konomi Shugo	Hajime Kawamura	June 1, 2024
After the match, Saphire Owl's team participates in the annual boat parade for the winners, though, due to their lack of training, they fall into the river during their greeting to the Queen. Ciel learns that he's been invited to the midnight tea that night with the principal for his efforts in the tournament. During the occasion, he confronts the principal and the prefects about the disappearance of Derrick and the other students. Agares states that won't be necessary as Derrick is here; sure enough, Derrick arrives, much to Ciel's surprise.
55	9	"His Butler, Having a Laugh"; Transliteration: "Sono Shitsuji, Rōshō" (Japanese: その執事、朗笑)	Yasuo Ejima	Hiroyuki Yoshino	Yasuo Ejima	June 8, 2024
Derrick attacks Herman, taking a bite out of his arm, and Ciel summons Sebastian to restrain him. He realizes that Derrick was transformed into a reanimated corpse like those they faced aboard the Campania. The principal reveals himself as Undertaker in disguise, affirming that he'd been toying with Ciel and Sebastian. The four prefects confess that Herman killed Derrick months ago and they sought help from the Aurora Society to cover it up. Derrick, who was Redmond's fag at the time, was assigned to investigate complaints of bullying occurring in the school, only for the prefects to discover that Derrick himself, along with four of his friends, were the culprits, tormenting and assaulting their schoolmates.
56	10	"His Butler, Assenting"; Transliteration: "Sono Shitsuji, Sandō" (Japanese: その執事、賛同)	Shinobu Sasaki	Sumika Hayakawa	Shinobu Sasaki	June 15, 2024
Despite witnessing Derrick's bullying, Agares had covered for him and threatened the prefects instead. Enraged at this, Herman killed Derrick and his accomplices, while the other prefects helped him cover it up, enlisting the help of the Aurora Society. Undertaker took this opportunity to continue his research and improve the corpses he creates. The Agares before them now is also a reanimated corpse; Undertaker's most successful one yet. Ciel orders Sebastian to capture Undertaker as they are attacked by the other reanimated students. Realizing that Undertaker's objective is to kidnap Ciel, Sebastian refuses his order and prioritizes protecting him instead, forcing Undertaker to flee. To prevent Derrick's crimes from being exposed and causing a family scandal, the Queen simply has the prefects expelled from Weston instead of arrested, with their fags, including Edward, replacing them as the new prefects. Ciel and Sebastian return home while the Queen considers welcoming Undertaker and his corpses as allies to England.
57	11	"His Butler, Taking Off"; Transliteration: "Sono Shitsuji, Kassō" (Japanese: その執事、滑走)	Kakushi Ifuku, Kenjirō Okada & Shōgo Ono	Hiroyuki Yoshino	Kenjirō Okada	June 22, 2024
Soma and Agni visit Ciel. Ciel and Sebastian take the Phantomhive servants to London for some shopping. There, they analyze Undertaker's funeral lockets and discover the locket of Ciel's grandmother, Claudia Phantomhive, among them, making them realize that Undertaker has been associated with the Phantomhives long before Ciel and his father. While inspecting the sales of the Funtom Company's new line of perfumes, Sebastian saves Irene Diaz from an accident and escorts her to her opera performance in time. In return, she helps promote the perfumes, making them sell out. Ciel then hires Irene as the face of his products. Meanwhile in Germany, two hunters pursue a fox into a forest said to be haunted. They ignore the warning that they will be cursed and come across a giant wolf creature.

=== Season 5: Emerald Witch Arc (2025) ===
No. overall	No. in season	Title	Directed by	Written by	Storyboarded by	Original release date
58	1	"His Butler, Doing Fieldwork"; Transliteration: "Sono Shitsuji, Tanbō" (Japanese: その執事、探訪)	Shinobu Sasaki	Konomi Shugo	Shinobu Sasaki	April 5, 2025
59	2	"His Butler, Sounding the Alarm"; Transliteration: "Sono Shitsuji, Keishō" (Japanese: その執事、警鐘)	Nahoko Iiyama	Sumika Hayakawa	Nahoko Iiyama	April 12, 2025
60	3	"His Butler, On Loan"; Transliteration: "Sono Shitsuji, Shukkō" (Japanese: その執事、出向)	Shōgo Ono	Hiroyuki Yoshino	Kenjirō Okada & Shōgo Ono	April 19, 2025
61	4	"His Butler, Serving"; Transliteration: "Sono Shitsuji, Hōkō" (Japanese: その執事、奉公)	Hidetoshi Takahashi & Yasuo Ejima	Michiko Yokote	Yasuo Ejima	April 26, 2025
62	5	"His Butler, Descending"; Transliteration: "Sono Shitsuji, Kakō" (Japanese: その執事、下降)	Kakushi Ifuku	Konomi Shugo	Kakushi Ifuku	May 3, 2025
63	6	"His Butler, Despairing"; Transliteration: "Sono Shitsuji, Shitsubō" (Japanese: その執事、失望)	Ryūichi Man'o	Sumika Hayakawa	Kenjirō Okada & Ryūichi Man'o	May 10, 2025
64	7	"His Butler, Encouraging"; Transliteration: "Sono Shitsuji, Kanshō" (Japanese: その執事、勧奨)	Yumeko Iwaoka	Hiroyuki Yoshino	Yumeko Iwaoka	May 17, 2025
65	8	"His Butler, Furious"; Transliteration: "Sono Shitsuji, Kyōbō" (Japanese: その執事、狂暴)	Ryūichi Man'o	Konomi Shugo	Tatsuya Kyōgoku	May 24, 2025
66	9	"His Butler, Crossing Paths"; Transliteration: "Sono Shitsuji, Sōhō" (Japanese: その執事、遭逢)	Ryou Kodama	Michiko Yokote	Ryou Kodama	May 31, 2025
67	10	"His Butler, Mopping Up"; Transliteration: "Sono Shitsuji, Sōtō" (Japanese: その執事、掃討)	Shinobu Sasaki	Sumika Hayakawa	Shinobu Sasaki	June 7, 2025
68	11	"His Butler, Much Unknown"; Transliteration: "Sono Shitsuji, Fushō" (Japanese: その執事、不詳)	Nahoko Iiyama	Michiko Yokote	Nahoko Iiyama	June 14, 2025
69	12	"His Butler, Calling"; Transliteration: "Sono Shitsuji, Jinbō" (Japanese: その執事、尋訪)	Akihisa Shibata	Hiroyuki Yoshino	Akihisa Shibata	June 21, 2025
70	13	"His Butler, Submerged"; Transliteration: "Sono Shitsuji, Senkō" (Japanese: その執事、潜航)	Kakushi Ifuku & Shōgo Ono	Hiroyuki Yoshino	Kakushi Ifuku	June 28, 2025
