= Delete (Sid song) =

- Regular edition cover

Single by SID
- Released: March 4, 2020
- Genre: Rock
- Length: 3:33
- Label: Ki/oon Records

SID singles chronology
"Sono Mirai e" (2019)	"Delete" (2020)	"Hokiboshi" (2020)

"Delete" is a single by Japanese rock band SID, released on March 4, 2020, via Ki/oon Music. It is the opening theme of The Seven Deadly Sins: Imperial Wrath of The Gods anime.

Sora Amamiya, who plays Elizabeth in the anime, covered "Delete" for the 2023 tribute album Sid Tribute Album -Anime Songs-.

== Promotion and release ==
The song was first performed at a concert at the Tokyo International Forum Hall on November 21, 2019, the last show of the tour in promotion of the album Shōnin Yokkyū. Its release as a single was announced on mid December. "Delete" was released in advance on streaming services as soon as it started airing in Nanatsu no Taizai series, on January 8, 2020. At 6:30 pm of the same day, members started a livestream on YouTube to talk about the single. They revealed complete information about the single's formats, content and artwork. A shortened version of the music video was also uploaded on the band's official YouTube channel at 8:00 pm. On February 19, the full version of the music video was made available on the channel, showing the four members playing their instruments facing each other.

"Delete" was released on CD on March 4 in three editions: regular, limited and anime limited edition. The regular edition comes with the CD only, with the title track and its instrumental version. The limited edition also includes a DVD with the song's music video and its making-of, and the anime limited edition includes the television cut of "Delete" and the anime's opening video without the credits.

First buyers of the single at Tower Records received a free poster.

== Musical style and themes ==
SID said they were honored to collaborate with a popular anime worldwide, and explained the song's message:

"Delete" is a message to those who have a "past" or "present" that they would like to delete, and our music expresses the idea of living strongly despite that. We would be happy if it resonated with people who got to know us through the anime.

CD Journal website commented that the song has a "fast-paced feel" and a "hooky arrangement".

== Commercial performance ==
"Delete" reached 25th position on weekly Oricon Singles Chart and stayed onchart for three weeks. It was the first time since "Sweet?" (2005) that a single by Sid did not surpass Oricon top 20.

== Track listing ==
All lyrics are written by Mao.

No.	Title	Length
1.	"Delete"	3:33
2.	"Delete" (Instrumental)	3:33
3.	"Delete" (TV Size)	1:33
Total length:		8:42

=== Limited edition ===
DVD
No.	Title	Length
1.	"Delete" (Music video)
2.	"Delete" (Music Video & off shot)

=== Anime edition ===
Bonus track
No.	Title	Length
3.	"Delete" (TV Size)	1:33

DVD
No.	Title	Length
1.	"Delete" (Music video)	3:33
2.	"Nanatsu no Taizai Kamigami no Gekirin Non Credits Opening" (「七つの大罪 神々の逆鱗」 （ノンクレジット オープニング映像）)	1:33

== Personnel ==
- Mao – vocals
- Shinji – guitar
- Aki – bass
- Yūya – drums
