= Ren'ai =

Ren'ai or Renai may refer to:

- Ren'ai, Nantou, a township in Nantou County, Taiwan
- Ren-ai District, of the city of Keelung, Taiwan
- Renai Medicity, a hospital in Kochi, Kerala, India
- Ren'ai adventure game, a romance-themed subgenre of adventure game
- Ren'ai simulation game, a romance-themed subgenre of life simulation game also known as a dating sim
- Renai (album), by Japanese rock band Sid
- "Renai Circulation", the 4th opening song in the anime Bakemonogatari
- Ren'ai Shoal in South China Sea

== See also ==
- 仁愛 (disambiguation)
