= Sweet? =

Single by SID

from the album Hoshi no Miyako
- Language: Japanese
- B-side: "Boku, dinner"
- Released: 2005
- Length: 8:20
- Label: Danger Crue
- Composer: Aki
- Lyricist: Mao

SID singles chronology
"Ryūtsū-ban" (2005)	"Sweet?" (2005)	"Hosoi Koe" (2006)

Music video
- "Sweet?" on YouTube

"Sweet?" is a single by the Japanese band SID, released on October 12, 2005. The title track was composed by band's bassist Aki and was included on the album Hoshi no Miyako.

It is considered SID's first official single, since the previous ones are classified as belonging to the band's "mourning period" and "paint pops" released in July, is a DVD+CD set.

== Promotion and release ==
The single was announced in mid-2005, along with the announcement of a new album (Hoshi no Miyako), the official fan club's opening, and a national tour. "Sweet?" was released in two editions, a regular edition and a limited edition. The limited edition was sold only by pre-order and was limited to 10,000 copies.

The tour had the same name as the single and took place from November 12 to 23, ending with a sold-out show on NHK Hall.

== Commercial performance ==
The single reached twenty-third position on Oricon Singles Chart, remaining on the chart for three weeks. It sold 7,019 copies while on charts. On Tower Records' Japanese rock and pop singles chart, it ranked nineteen.

== Track listing ==
All lyrics are written by Mao.

No.	Title	Music	Length
1.	"Sweet?"	Aki	4:16
2.	"Boku, dinner" (僕、ディナー)		4:03
Total length:			8:20

== Personnel ==
- Mao – vocals
- Shinji – guitar
- Aki – bass
- Yūya – drums
