= The Seven Deadly Sins: Imperial Wrath of The Gods =

2019-20 Japanese anime TV series

- Season 3
- First key visual of the season
- No. of episodes: 24

Release
- Original network: TV Tokyo, BS TV Tokyo
- Original release: October 9, 2019 – March 25, 2020

Season chronology
- ← Previous; Revival of The Commandments Next → Dragon's Judgement

The Seven Deadly Sins: Imperial Wrath of The Gods (七つの大罪 神々の逆鱗, Nanatsu no Taizai: Kamigami no Gekirin), subtitle also known simply as Wrath of The Gods, is the third season of The Seven Deadly Sins anime television series, which is based on the manga series of the same name written and illustrated by Nakaba Suzuki. The season was animated by Studio Deen instead of A-1 Pictures and premiered on October 9, 2019. Susumu Nishizawa and Rintarō Ikeda replaced Takeshi Furuta and Takao Yoshioka as director and series composer respectively, with Hiroyuki Sawano, Kohta Yamamoto, and Takafumi Wada returning to reprise their roles as the music composers. The series was broadcast on TV Tokyo and BS TV Tokyo. The season was released on Netflix in licensed markets on August 6, 2020, as "Imperial Wrath of The Gods". The first opening theme song is "Rob The Frontier" by Uverworld, and the first ending theme song is "Regeneration" by Sora Amamiya. The second opening theme song is "delete" by Sid and the second ending theme is "Good day" by Kana Adachi.

== Episodes ==
Story	Episode	Title (Note: English translated titles are taken from Netflix.)	Directed by	Written by	Storyboarded by	Original release date
53	1	"The Light That Sweeps Away the Darkness"; Transliteration: "Yami wo Harau Hikari" (Japanese: 闇を払う光)	Bob Shirohata, Kazuya Fujishiro	Rintarou Ikeda	Bob Shirohata	October 9, 2019
Ban and Meliodas defeat a group of demons, saving villagers that had been captured as demons' food after falling into a trap set by another village in Camelot. As the two of them camp out, Meliodas recalls how his power increases exponentially when he returns to his former demonic self, but also the fear of losing himself that comes with it. The two of them continue to set out to eradicate demons, tracing the trap to a village in Camelot, where the Ten Commandments have made their stronghold. In Ordan village, Pelio attempts to fight the demons to stop his community from continually capturing sacrifices for them, but he fails and is nearly slaughtered. They are ultimately saved by Ban and Meliodas, along with Gowther, Escanor, Merlin and Elizabeth. Back at Liones, Bartra appoints Howzer as the new acting Grandmaster Holy Knight, needing a leader to rise during this dark age. Privately, the King reveals to the current five members of the Seven Deadly Sins a premonition of his: the Sins will reassemble when the moon shines at midday and the fog hangs low in the royal capital. In the Fairy King's Forest, the missing two members, Diane and King, encounter each other unexpectedly in a bathing river.
54	2	"Memories of the Holy War"; Transliteration: "Seisen no Kioku" (Japanese: 聖戦の記憶)	Yoshito Hata	Rintarou Ikeda	Susumu Nishizawa	October 16, 2019
Diane and King, not knowing of Meliodas' revival, mourn over his death together. As the Giant and Fairy Clans now live together in the Fairy King's Forest, King has created a barrier to repel demons and the peace culminates in a dance festival. During the dance, Gerheade sees a vision of the first Fairy King, Gloxinia, who is grateful that she is alive. When the dance stops, however, everyone realises that Diane and King are missing, the two having been teleported to Drole and Gloxinia. The two former kings promise to kill them unless they successfully pass a test after completely defeating them. Drole and Gloxinia transport Diane and King into their past selves respectively, in order to help them determine whether they made the right choice 3,000 years ago that wound up to them being members of the Ten Commandments. Diane and King watch through Drole and Gloxinia's eyes as they fight alongside Meliodas and a member of the Goddess clan greatly resembling Elizabeth against the Demon Clan.
55	3	"Let There Be Light"; Transliteration: "Hikari Are" (Japanese: 光あれ)	Kazuya Fujishiro	Rie Uehara	Susumu Nishizawa	October 23, 2019
King and Diane discover how powerful Gloxinia and Drole actually are, able to go head-to-head with the Ten Commandments easily. The humans they save from the Demon Clan end up joining their group, Stigma, to fight in the Holy War, with their leader Rou being a man greatly resembling Ban. As Stigma regroups back at the Fairy King's Forest, King meets with Gerheade, who reveals that her and Gloxinia are siblings. Stigma then meets with Ludociel, one of the Four Archangels and the Goddess Clan strongest warriors, who incites everyone to completely eradicate the demons, much to Elizabeth's horror. Elizabeth, who believes in fighting for peace and not destruction, urges Ludociel to reconsider, and when it fails, leaves to negotiate with an upcoming wave of demons, led by Derieri and Monspeet, with fellow Ten Commandments Fraudrin and Galand joining them. Derieri agrees to leave peacefully if Elizabeth returns their captured brethren, but Ludociel gleefully presents to the demons a barrier of light, an Omega Ark, containing the wounded bodies of thousands of demons, one of which is Derieri's sister, before murdering all of them. The negotiations break down and the Holy War reaches its climax. King entrusts Rou and the humans with the duty of protecting the Forest and Gerheade during his absence and rushes to help with Diane.
56	4	"The Ten Commandments vs. The Four Archangels"; Transliteration: "<Jikkai> vs. <Yondai Tenshi>" (Japanese: 〈十戒〉vs.〈四大天使〉)	Shunji Yoshida	Yoshiki Ōkusa	Yukihiro Matsushita	October 30, 2019
Derieri knocks Elizabeth unconscious in anger, believing that she was lying to them the whole time about wanting to make peace with the Demon Clan. The Archangels Tarmiel and Sariel then arrive to eliminate the demon army using a powerful Omega Ark, but the members of the Ten Commandments leading the army manage to escape the blast and struggle against the Archangels, with Derieri losing her left arm to Sariel. Inside Stigma's headquarters, Ludociel entrusts Nerobasta to guard the Gate of Heaven so as to allow reinforcements from the rest of the clan and departs to join the fighting. Unbeknownst to him, Gowther and Melascula have infiltrated headquarters and currently control Nerobasta. On the battlefield, Derieri and Monspeet sacrifice six of their seven hearts to release a tremendous amount of power, transforming into horrible creatures whose only instinct is to destroy, called Indura, placing them at an advantage. Meliodas, King and Diane find Elizabeth unconscious in a barrier set up by Sariel prior to the battle's beginning. Meliodas chooses to pull her out, badly burning his arms from the goddess power. Although Elizabeth laments, she swiftly returns to the battlefield as Monspeet's power destroys the forest, declaring that she will stop the war.
57	5	"Emotional Maelstrom"; Transliteration: "Kanjō Meirushutorōmu" (Japanese: 感情メイルストローム)	Seung Deok Kim, Yoshihisa Matsumoto	Yoshiki Ōkusa	Hideki Tonokatsu	November 6, 2019
Elizabeth uses a spell 'Let there be light' to purify Derieri and Monspeet with the help of Sariel and Tarmiel, while Meliodas prevents Ludociel from interfering. She argues with Ludociel, who claims that the demons are unworthy of being saved, over who and what decides the worth of others when light and darkness fall equally upon everyone. Ludociel, overpowered, calls telepathically to Nerobasta for reinforcements, reawakening her from her trance as Gowther and Melascula are attempting to transform the Gate of Heaven into a portal to the Demon Realm. Nerobasta calls the humans in the Fairy King's Forest instead, only for Gerheade to realize that Rou and his troops were actually the demon's accomplices, slaughtering other members who were fooled. Diane and King rush to the Goddesses' headquarters, the Light of Grace, as Meliodas stays behind to take care of Elizabeth, who has collapsed after exhausting her power. There, they engage in combat with Gowther and inadvertently reveal their identities to him. Melascula is in a fury after realizing Gowther manipulated her to summon a gate into the Demon Realm's Prison, where Gowther's real body, a paraplegic demon, appears from within. He reveals to a shocked Diane and King that the Gowther they have been speaking to is a doll he created. bidding Melascula farewell.
58	6	"We Call That Love"; Transliteration: "Sore wo Bokura wa Ai to Yobu" (Japanese: それをボクらは愛と呼ぶ)	Masayuki Iimura	Rintarou Ikeda	Bob Shirohata	November 13, 2019
Demon Gowther informs King and Diane about the humans' betrayal, prompting King to return to the Forest. Diane remains to speak to Gowther, who is pleased the Holy War will end soon as it gives meaning to his death. He severs the connection between him and the doll Gowther, giving the doll sentience in order for them to go their separate ways. Demon Gowther requests for Diane to be doll Gowther's friend in the future and returns her missing memories to thank her. In the Forest, Gerheade attempts to reason with Rou and has her right eye destroyed and her wings and legs cut off. Rou questions why she didn't use her powers and Gerheade admits to looking into his memories and discovering a human who resembled her. Rou reveals she was murdered by Stigma after the village looked after a wounded but kind demon. Ashamed. he realizes he has committed atrocities like Stigma, but Gerheade comforts him. Rou vows to protect her if he reincarnates. Just then, King returns to find Rou holding a collapsed Gerheade. Mistaking her as dead, he attacks him but ultimately stops, remembering how he did the same to Ban, although he finds Rou already dead. Behind him, the real Gloxinia has killed Rou. King awakens in the present, where Gloxinia admits he plunged into a downfall of evil from that point on and congratulates King on changing history. Back in the past, Zeldris has traveled through the Gate and lands near Diane and the Gowthers.
59	7	"Deadly Sins Unite!"; Transliteration: "Iza, Taizai Shūketsu e!!" (Japanese: いざ、大罪集結へ！！)	Yoshito Hata	Yoshiki Ōkusa	Yukihiro Matsushita	November 20, 2019
Diane fights Zeldris, giving the Gowthers time to stop the Holy War. Having borrowed the Demon King's power, Zeldris seals Diane's power and lets her choose to die or join the Ten Commandments. In the present, Drole narrates the events of the past as they happen, but if Diane dies in the past or chooses to accept the offer, she can never return. Zeldris talks to Diane of Drole's past as he was alienated from the other giants due to his larger size, one eye, four arms and blue skin, which reminds Diane of how she was similarly an outcast due to her poor outlook on fighting. Diane reawakens in the present, having chosen to run away — something a giant would never do, shocking Drole. Diane then kisses King, as she now has her memories returned to her, and the two confess their feelings for each other. Through each of their journeys, King realizes that he has also grown tiny wings, which Gloxinia assures will grow in size as he matures both emotionally and physically. As Gloxinia reunites with his sister, Gerheade shows him Oslo, who the former realizes is Rou reincarnated and has been indeed protecting her all this while. Gloxinia decides to defect from the Ten Commandments and protect the Forest in King's place, allowing the two to reunite with everyone else. Diane promises to return Gowther's lost heart to him, which King Bartra offers, but Gowther runs away in fear. Merlin shrinks Diane as she and the other Sins chase after him.
60	8	"The Doll Seeks Love"; Transliteration: "Ningyō wa Ai wo Kou" (Japanese: 人形は愛を乞う)	Shunji Yoshida	Yurika Miyao	Shinichi Watanabe	November 27, 2019
While searching for Gowther, Meliodas tells Ban the Commandment of Selflessness erases the memories and emotions of those who desire it. As Gowther hides, he faintly recalls a young woman but prepares to use his power on himself to forget it, deeming the memory a malfunction. A flashback reveals that 45 years ago, when Gowther still had his emotions and heart, he was found by the then-princess of Liones, Nadja, who was King Bartra's sickly elder sister. Gowther, realizing he had been asleep since the end of the Holy War, buries demon Gowther's body. Nadja frequently visits to spend time with him and he reveals his identity to her. Gowther, who has fallen in love with her, realizes Nadja's heart will soon stop beating, and after she dies, he partially undresses her and removes his heart in an attempt to bring her back to life. To the guards who arrived from his distressed cries, it looked as if he raped and killed the princess, earning him the Sin of Lust. After being sentenced to execution, Gowther decides to discard his heart to be rid of emotional and physical pain. In the present, Diane stops him from erasing his memories again and tells him that although memories can be painful, they are precious. Merlin, having examined Gowther's heart, reveals there has never been any magic inside it all this time, prompting him to accept the pain of the past.
61	9	"The Cursed Lovers"; Transliteration: "Norowareshi Koibito-tachi" (Japanese: 呪われし恋人たち)	Shigeki Awai	Rie Uehara	Bob Shirohata	December 4, 2019
A familiar of Merlin's searches Camelot for Arthur but is found by Zeldris, who uses it to curse Merlin. Diane asks how Gowther's creator ended the Holy War as the idea was the Goddess Clan sacrificed themselves to seal the Demon Clan, but Gowther refuses to answer, saddened. Diane tells Elizabeth there was a Goddess who looked like her with Meliodas 3000 years ago, and Elizabeth remembers Cain saying there was an Elizabeth at Danafor that was also Meliodas's girlfriend. Elizabeth asks Meliodas about the coincidences with her namesakes but Meliodas doesn't answer. Merlin is feverish the next morning and Elizabeth telepathically meets Zeldris when she tries to heal her. Zeldris calls Elizabeth a cursed goddess torturing Meliodas. She has been dying, losing the memories of her past life, reincarnating, and meeting Meliodas over and over. The Elizabeth of the present day is Goddess Elizabeth from 3000 years ago. Elizabeth is happy as that means she's always been with Meliodas, but Zeldris says she's been torturing him and returns her memories of her past lives. After Merlin awakens, Elizabeth leaves to get some air alone, pleased she can remember her time with him. The Seven Deadly Sins set out to free Camelot, leaving Ban tortured. The barrier around the city is held by Melascula, and if they kill her, the spell keeping Elaine alive will end. Elizabeth becomes entangled in the memories of her past lives, shouting about tragedies that happened millennia ago. Her eyes glow orange, Goddess eyes, and she collapses. Meliodas is in despair. If all her memories return, she will die in three days.
62	10	"The Life We Live"; Transliteration: "Sore ga Bokura no Ikirumichi" (Japanese: それが僕らの生きる道)	Kazue Otsuki	Rintarou Ikeda	Shinichi Watanabe	December 11, 2019
Meliodas reveals to the rest of the Sins he and Elizabeth have been cursed by the Demon King and Supreme Deity respectively: he will be immortal and never die, but Elizabeth will constantly reincarnate and Meliodas will be forced to watch every one of her deaths. This was due to them forming a relationship despite being from the Demon and Goddess Clans. After the Holy War ended, Meliodas wandered the continent upon discovering the original Elizabeth dead, only to meet her reincarnation, a human with no memory of him. As they relationship deepened again, the new Elizabeth's right eye became a Goddess symbol, confirming Meliodas's suspicions of her being an incarnate, and narrates the past to her which prompts her left eye to take the symbol as well. Elizabeth, having regained her memories, tells Meliodas of their respective curses and reveals she will die three days after regaining her memories. Meliodas has met 107 Elizabeths and seen 106 of them die. Meliodas decided to work with Merlin to break the curse, with their only lead being Zeldris, who is able to borrow the Demon King's power, but this requires reopening the Coffin of Eternal Darkness where the Ten Commandments are sealed. However, Fraudrin was restored by a demon worshipper after sacrificing all the citizens of Danafor and killed Liz, Elizabeth's then reincarnation, to use her Goddess blood to reopen the Coffin, although it fails. Meliodas destroyed Danafor in anguish and rage, only to rediscover the newborn child of a woman to be the present Elizabeth.
63	11	"The Hateful Cannot Rest"; Transliteration: "Onnen-tachi wa Nemuranai" (Japanese: 怨念たちは眠らない)	Masayuki Iimura	Rintarou Ikeda	Hideki Tonokatsu	December 18, 2019
The Seven Deadly Sins approach the ruined city of Coland, which is the source of a dimensional warp that is preventing them from accessing Camelot. On approach they notice Zeldris waiting at the entrance. Meliodas attacks him instantly only to find out it was a trap set by Melascula. She traps Meliodas in her Cocoon of Darkness and forces the other Sins to fight an army of skeletons powered by the trapped captain's dark energy. Diane's mind gets taken over by the hateful thoughts of the slaughtered people. Gowther tries to help and fails, and Helbram offers himself as the culprit responsible for massacring the city in his deranged hatred against humans. It is still not enough to save Diane until Elizabeth arrives and uses her Ark to purify the resentment of the spirits and save her.
64	12	"Love is a Maiden's Power"; Transliteration: "Ai wa Otome no Chikara" (Japanese: 愛は乙女の力)	Kazuya Fujishiro	Yoshiki Ōkusa	Megumi Soeno	December 25, 2019
Melascula appears before the Seven Deadly Sins, transforming into a giant snake, her true form, to exact revenge on Ban. He was saved from her by Elaine, whose feelings for Ban led her to gain her wings. With the help of Elizabeth's Goddess powers, Melascula is sealed away by Merlin. Suddenly, Meliodas escapes the Cocoon of Darkness at the cost of his emotions, now standing against his comrades with hostility. Facing him first is the strongest man alive, Escanor.
65	13	"The Almighty vs. the Greatest Evil"; Transliteration: "Saikyō vs. Saikyō" (Japanese: 最強 vs. 最凶)	Shigeki Awai	Yoshiki Ōkusa	Marie Tagashira	January 8, 2020
Meliodas and Escanor face off against each other in a grave battle. Meliodas' demonic strength puts the Sin of Pride on the ropes, but Escanor eventually subdues him upon entering his one-minute overpowered state, "The One". After Meliodas and Escanor's fierce battle at Coland concludes, the Sins take the injured Meliodas and Escanor (left overexerted from Sunshine's effect on him) to Camelot for Arthur's help. Meanwhile, Lord Orlondi, Merlin's familiar, finds Arthur (or vice versa), taking him to his secret hideout where Nanashi and many of his subjects are hiding out. After some time, Nanashi tells Arthur to set their plan in motion: to retrieve the holy sword 'Excalibur'. On the other hand, in Camelot's capital, the Demon King orders Zeldris to retrieve Meliodas now that he has reverted to his former self.
66	14	"A New Threat"; Transliteration: "Aratanaru Kyōi" (Japanese: 新たなる脅威)	Toshihiro Nagao	Yurika Miyao	Ken'ichi Ishikura	January 15, 2020
Committed to the task of rescuing Meliodas, Zeldris attempts to gather the remaining Ten Commandments, but get no response. Chandler and Cusack, Meliodas' master and his own respectively, appears. Chandler offers to personally rescue Meliodas, whom he easily finds, easily putting the Seven Deadly Sins on the ropes.
67	15	"To Our Captain"; Transliteration: "Danchō e" (Japanese: 団長へ)	Taiki Nishimura	Rintarou Ikeda	Shinichi Watanabe	January 22, 2020
The Seven Deadly Sins fight back against Chandler with all they got, but the Pacifier Fiend proves to be way too powerful, darkening the sky to prevent Escanor from helping. He undergoes a transformation as a final attempt to take back Meliodas by deadly force.
68	16	"The Seven Deadly Sins End"; Transliteration: "Nanatsu no Taizai Shūketsu" (Japanese: 〈七つの大罪〉終結)	Fumio Maezono	Rie Uehara	Masaki Ōzora	January 29, 2020
The Seven Deadly Sins are saved from Chandler by Gloxinia and Drole, who pass their titles to Diane and King before they sacrifice their lives in order to buy them time to escape. However, Chandler tracks them down again as Meliodas finally awakens to reveal he will find a way to break his and Elizabeth's curses by becoming the new Demon King. To prevent the others from interfering, Meliodas uses his rank as captain to disband the Seven Deadly Sins.
69	17	"Our Choices"; Transliteration: "Bokutachi no Sentaku" (Japanese: ボクたちの選択)	Shunji Yoshida	Rintarou Ikeda	Masaki Ōzora	February 5, 2020
In a desperate attempt to save his best friend, Ban offers to go to Purgatory and bring back Meliodas' emotions, as he is the only one who can survive the realm's dangerous environment. Meanwhile, Meliodas returns to the Demon Clan with his own plan for breaking his and Elizabeth's curses: becoming the new Demon King.
70	18	"March of the Saints"; Transliteration: "Seija no Kōshin" (Japanese: 聖者の行進)	Kazuya Fujishiro	Rintarou Ikeda	Kazuya Fujishiro	February 12, 2020
Merlin negotiates with Zeldris for a bargain in exchange for something else. Meanwhile, Princess Margaret's search for Gilthunder comes to an end after she pays a high price in order to save her lover: sacrificing her body to be a vessel for the Goddess Clan's highest-ranked warrior: Ludociel of the Four Archangels.
71	19	"The Holy War Pact"; Transliteration: "Seisen Kyōtei" (Japanese: 聖戦協定)	Toshihiro Nagao	Yurika Miyao	Maho Aoki	February 19, 2020
Thanks to Ludociel's intervention, the rest of the Seven Deadly Sins evacuate most of Camelot's citizens and rescue Elizabeth, who escapes and joins them to find a way of stopping Meliodas from becoming the new Demon King, even if that means to die again. Once they reunite with the recently awakened Four Archangels, including Sariel and Tarmiel in vessels of their own, Elizabeth, in representation of the Seven Deadly Sins, forms a pact with Ludociel in order to protect Meliodas and the rest of their loved ones.
72	20	"Child of Hope"; Transliteration: "Kibō no Ko" (Japanese: 希望の子)	Yoshito Hata	Yurika Miyao	Shinichi Watanabe	February 26, 2020
As the Seven Deadly Sins prepare for the upcoming war, Ludociel confronts Escanor about his magic power Sunshine, revealing its origin and its former holder. Meanwhile, Arthur infiltrates Camelot and claims Excalibur, intending to fight Meliodas and his allies by himself.
73	21	"Beginning of the Holy War"; Transliteration: "Seisen no Makuake" (Japanese: 聖戦の幕開け)	Fumio Maezono	Yoshiki Ōkusa	Hideki Tonokatsu	March 4, 2020
Merlin saves Arthur from a losing battle with the demons, but as he safely teleported to the Boar Hat, Cusack uses a spell to remotely control Arthur and impale him with Excalibur. On the other hand, Ludociel leads the Holy Knights to resume the Holy War in order to finish it once for all.
74	22	"War-torn Britannia"; Transliteration: "Senka no Buritania" (Japanese: 戦禍のブリタニア)	Masayuki Iimura	Rintarou Ikeda	Bob Shirohata	March 11, 2020
The Holy War rages on as King and Diane are supported by Elizabeth and the Archangels to aid out the Holy Knights in the battlefield, Elizabeth managing to convince some of the less violent demons to withdraw while working to heal Deathpierce and the other Holy Knights, who are too deluded by Ludociel's Breath of Bless to realize their injuries. Meanwhile, at a nearby village, Annie, a villager allowing Monspeet and Derieri, who were hiding out since their defeat during the Liones siege, to stay with her, evacuates with her villagers due to the war approaching them. The two Demons agree to relinquish their commandments when they see Annie killed by Estarossa. Monspeet uses his Trick Star to keep him from eating her soul, restraining Estarossa after revealing his intent on claiming their commandments, having already taken Galand's, before explaining that only Meliodas and Zeldris can withstand holding multiple commandments. However, when Estarossa manages to grab Derieri to rip out her remaining heart, Monspeet sacrifices himself to take the fatal blow and ensure Derieri's escape, lamenting that he never confessed his love for her.
75	23	"The One Twisted by Darkness"; Transliteration: "Yami ni Yugamu Mono" (Japanese: 闇に歪む者)	Taiki Nishimura	Rintarou Ikeda	Shigenori Kageyama	March 18, 2020
Estarossa pursues Derieri to the battlefield, deciding to steal Elizabeth for himself, but is confronted by both Sariel and Tarmiel, who seek to kill him and avenge a fallen member of the Four Archangels. The three commandments in his body cause him to grow insane, believing himself to be Meliodas.
76	24	"Rampaging Love"; Transliteration: "Bōsō suru Ai" (Japanese: 暴走する愛)	Shunji Yoshida, Hideki Tonokatsu, Shinichi Watanabe	Rintarou Ikeda	Masaki Ōzora	March 25, 2020
A twisted and unstable Estarossa tries to capture Elizabeth, after recalling his love for her. Being unable to fully control the power of the absorbed Commandments, Estarossa goes berserk, putting everyone in danger. In order to save her loved ones, Elizabeth agrees to go with him. The Holy Knights prepare for the next battle, while King leads a rescue team made of Hawk, Sariel, Tarmiel, and a reformed Derieri to go after Elizabeth. Meanwhile, at Purgatory, Meliodas' emotions awaken, determined to return to Britannia.

== Home media release ==
=== Japanese ===
VAP (Japan – Region 2/A)
Box	Discs	Episodes	Release date	Ref.
I	3 + 1 bonus CD	1–12	February 12, 2020	
II	3 + 1 bonus DVD	13–24	September 25, 2020	
