= 2°C Me no Kanojo =

- Regular edition cover

Single by SID

from the album Hikari
- B-side: "Nakidashita Onna to Kyomu-kan"
- Released: January 14, 2009
- Genre: J-pop
- Length: 12:17
- Label: Ki/oon Records
- Songwriters: Mao, Aki

SID singles chronology
"Monochrome no Kiss" (2009)	"2°C Me no Kanojo" (2009)	"Uso" (2009)

"2°C Me no Kanojo" (2℃目の彼女, Nidome no Kanojo) is a single by Japanese band Sid, released on January 14, 2009, by Ki/oon Music. It was released in three editions; the regular with a CD and its three tracks, and the limited editions A and B with a bonus DVD that differs between the two versions.

"2°C Me no Kanojo" is a theme song for the television programs Arabiki-dan, aired on TBS TV, and PVTV, aired on TV Tokyo. The B-side is "Nakidashita Onna to Kyomu-kan" (泣き出した女と虚無感), which was used in a commercial for the jewelry brand GemCEREY. The third track is a live recording of "Owakare no Uta" at Nippon Budokan.

== Musical style and reception ==
Tower Records called it a "powerful song" and commented that the band's ability was already there before joining Ki/oon Music. Digital music magazine CD Journal opined that the "melancholic melody" (a term also used by Tower Records) stands out in the fast-paced sound, and praised the group's songwriting ability, vocals and guitars. Thematically, the magazine described "2°C Me no Kanojo" as a danceable, winter-themed love song. They elaborated: "[...] About pledging eternal love to an old lover who happens to meet you again."

Speaking about the B-side "Nakidashita Onna to Kyomu-kan", CD Journal said that it is a well-developed jazzy track that utilizes glockenspiel, and is also a song about love.

== Commercial performance ==
The single peaked at number three on Oricon Singles Chart and remained on chart for twelve weeks. On Tower Records' Japanese Rock and Pop Singles chart, it peaked at number two.

It sold 48,213 physical copies while on the Oricon charts, becoming the band's eighth best-selling single. It was certified gold disc by RIAJ for selling over 100,000 digital downloads.

== Track listing ==
All lyrics are written by Mao.

No.	Title	Music	Length
1.	"2°C Me no Kanojo" (2℃目の彼女)	Shinji	4:13
2.	"Nakidashita Onna to Kyomu-kan" (泣き出した女と虚無感)	Aki	3:59
3.	"Owakare no Uta" (お別れの唄, Live at Nippon Budokan 2008.11.2)	Shinji	4:03
Total length:			12:17

== Personnel ==
- Mao – vocals
- Shinji – guitar
- Aki – bass
- Yūya – drums
