= Dark side (EP) =

EP by SID
- Released: September 17, 2025
- Genre: Rock
- Length: 14:13
- Language: Japanese
- Label: Ki/oon

SID chronology
Umibe (2022)	Dark side (2025)

Dark side is the second EP by Japanese band SID, released on September 17, 2025, in two editions. Its concept is to bring back the heavier sound linked to the band's early visual kei rock.

== Promotion and release ==
In early July 2025, before the EP was revealed, a seven-date Dark side tour was announced, to run from October 5 to November 9 in Japan, along with a new look for the band, with the musicians wearing black suits against a dark backdrop.

The EP and its details were announced at the end of July, along with the promotional single “0.5 Byou no Koi” (0.5秒の恋). The single was released digitally on August 6, and its music video premiered later that day.

Dark side was released in two editions: regular and limited. The limited edition comes with a bonus Blu-ray disc featuring a recording of Best of SID 2025 concert, held on April 10.

== Composition and themes ==
The concept behind Dark side is to bring back the heavier side of SID from its early years, when the band had a sound more managed towards typical visual keirock. In an interview with Natalie website, the members shared their feelings about composing heavier songs again.

Vocalist Mao said that the narrative of the single “0.5 Byou no Koi” was written as a prelude to "Propose" (B-side of “Natsukoi”). It was composed by bassist Aki, who sought to match Mao's vision, along with the keyword and image of Dark side. The second track on the EP, “Shout,” was composed by Shinji and recorded in a single take. It is a song about teenage impulses. The other two tracks, “Kioku no Umi” and "Akushumi", were composed by drummer Yūya. According to Mao, the first deals with “daydreaming,” while the second seeks to portray “a dark and sensual world between men and women” without the intention of being “simple.”

In an interview with Billboard Japan, Mao stated that he wanted to create a concept that would link the album to the tour. He came up with the idea for Dark side by looking for the band's strengths and distinctive features, as well as feeling that he had more freedom in creating EPs than in creating albums. Aki and Shinji said that they found it easy to understand and produce the concept. Yūya said that he worked on the songs with their live performance in mind, since the EP is directly linked to their tour.

== Commercial performance ==
At Oricon, Dark side reached No. 17 on the weekly chart and No. 6 on the daily chart. It also reached third place on the rock albums chart. It sold 3,573 copies in the first week.

== Track listing ==
All lyrics are written by Mao.

No.	Title	Music	Length
1.	"Kioku no Umi" (記憶の海)	Yūya	3:58
2.	"Shout"	Shinji	3:24
3.	"Akushumi" (悪趣味)	Yūya	3:41
4.	"0.5 Byou no Koi" (0.5秒の恋)	Aki	3:09
Total length:			14:13

== Personnel ==
- Mao – vocals
- Shinji – guitar
- Aki – bass
- Yūya – drums
