= Ichiban Suki na Basho =

EP by SID
- Released: August 22, 2018
- Length: 19:35
- Language: Japanese
- Label: Kioon Music

SID chronology
Nomad (2017)	Ichiban Suki na Basho (2018)	Shōnin Yokkyū (2019)

Ichiban Suki na Basho (いちばん好きな場所) is the first EP by Japanese rock band SID, released on August 22, 2018, by Kioon Music.

== Background ==
The EP was inspired by the band's tours Ichiban Suki na Basho (いちばん好きな場所), which can be translated to My Favorite Place. The first took place in 2008 as the last indies tour, right before the group joined Ki/oon Music, and the second in 2010. In the first one, Sid performed in concert halls that they played in at the beginning of the band, marking the EP as a tribute to these places.

== Promotion and release ==
Ichiban Suki na Basho release was announced on June 16, 2018, at a concert at Zepp Tokyo. On August 8, the group made their work available on several music streaming services. At the same time, the cover art of Ichiban Suki na Basho were revealed and the title track was released on these services. Two days later, the track's music video was released on YouTube. On August 13, the band made a public recording for Yamada Hisashi no Radian Limited F radio at LaLaport Toyosu shopping mall in Tokyo and the same at Abeno Q's Mall in Osaka for REDNIQS radio the following day, explaining the mini album and its production. Soon after, an exclusive event for those who pre-ordered the EP was also held.

Ichiban Suki na Basho was released on August 22, 2018, celebrating the band's 15th anniversary. It was released in two editions: regular and limited. The regular version comes with the CD with its 5 tracks only, and the limited edition includes a bonus DVD. Buyers of the EP received a prize-winning sticker, potentially winning a pin or a rainproof cell phone case from the band's merchandise. For purchases in online stores, the gift was a postcard. Additionally, the album contained a download of an interview with the members.

== Touring ==
Another Ichiban Suki na Basho tour was announced with the EP announcement on June 16, 2018. The tour took place after the release of the EP, from September to November, and tickets at all venues sold out on the same day sales were opened. An additional date was revealed on the first show: March 10, 2019 on Yokohama Arena. The tour expanded to Asia in 2019, with shows in Taipei, Xangai, Hong Kong and Beijing.

== Commercial performance ==
Ichiban Suki na Basho reached number eight on Oricon Albums Chart and remained on chart for four weeks. On Billboard Japan Hot Albums, it reached thirteenth place.

== Track listing ==
All lyrics are written by Mao

No.	Title	Music	Length
1.	"Voice"	Aki	2:52
2.	"Reverb"	Shinji	4:11
3.	"Sono Mirai e" (その未来へ)	Aki	4:06
4.	"Rubber Sole" (ラバーソール)	Yūya	3:04
5.	"Ichiban Suki na Basho" (いちばん好きな場所)	Yūya	5:21
Total length:			19:35

== Personnel ==
- Mao – vocals
- Shinji – guitar
- Aki – bass
- Yūya – drums
