= Umibe =

- Artistic edition cover

Studio album by Sid
- Released: March 23, 2022
- Genre: Rock
- Length: 40:48
- Language: Japanese
- Label: Ki/oon Music

Sid chronology
Shōnin Yokkyū (2019)	Umibe (2022)	Dark side (2025)

Singles from Umibe
- 1. "Jiu no Kuchizuke" Released: July 18, 2021

Umibe (海辺) is the eleventh studio album by Japanese rock band Sid, released on March 23, 2022, by Ki/oon Music. The digital single "Jiu no Kuchizuke" is the opening theme of Heaven Official's Blessing.

== Background ==
The concept of Umibe is "Reiwa Kayo", Kayōkyoku of the Reiwa era. However, initially the members thought of making an album centered on city pop. Mao, the vocalist and writer of all the lyrics, said that the first part of the album to be produced was the lyrics, for the first time in the band, and that the key to the album is the words.

The Umibe promotion tour was scheduled for shortly after the release, but had to be postponed due to Mao's health problems. It took place about a year later, from April to May 2023.

== Release ==
On July 4, 2021, Heaven Official's Blessing animation began serialization and the chosen opening theme was "Jiu no Kuchizuke" by Sid, released as a digital single on the 18th.

In mid-January 2022, Sid announced a new album, Umibe, set to be released on March 23. On March 1, the pre-save of the track "Damashi Ai" began and its music video was released on YouTube in the evening. Soon after, they started an experimental tour on movie theaters in five cities across Japan. On March 8 the song "Daisuki dakara..." also became available for pre-save.

Umibe pre-sale started on March 15. It was released in three editions, the regular one only having the 11-track CD. The "Artistic Edition" comes with a 40-page photo booklet and a DVD in Blu-ray containing the music videos for the title track "Umibe", "Damashi Ai" and their respective making-ofs. In the "Poetic Edition", the album is a 100-page hardcover leather book where the lyrics were written in poetry and explained by vocalist Mao. After the release, a lottery campaign was held among the album buyers where it was possible to win posters and autographs.

== Critical reception ==
Bounce magazine, in the April 2022 issue, stated that Umibe has Sid's characteristic sentimentality, incorporating genres such as shoegaze and dream pop in the title track and chilling lyrics such as "Daisuki dakara...".

== Track listing ==
No.	Title	Length
1.	"Keibetsu" (軽蔑)	3:57
2.	"Daisuki dakara..." (大好きだから…)	3:38
3.	"Juusangastu" (13月)	4:09
4.	"Gairouju" (街路樹)	3:50
5.	"Ekitai" (液体)	3:02
6.	"Damashi Ai" (騙し愛)	3:26
7.	"Shiroi Koe" (白い声)	4:56
8.	"Jiu no Kuchizuke" (慈雨のくちづけ)	4:00
9.	"Yureru Natsufuku" (揺れる夏服)	4:06
10.	"Umibe" (海辺)	5:39
Total length:		40:48

Artistic Edition

Tracks from DVD
No.	Title	Length
1.	"Damashi Ai Music Video" (騙し愛)
2.	"Making-of Music Video Damashi Ai" (騙し愛)
3.	"Umibe Music Video" (海辺)
4.	"Photo Session & Making of Music Video Umibe" (海辺)

== Personnel ==
- Mao – vocals
- Shinji – guitar
- Aki – bass
- Yūya – drums

== Charts ==
Chart performance for Umibe
Chart (2023)	Peak position
Japanese Albums (Oricon)	11
Hot Albums (Billboard Japan)	13
