= Hoshi no Miyako =

Studio album by SID
- Released: November 16, 2005
- Genre: Rock
- Length: 45:28
- Language: Japanese
- Label: Danger Crue Records

SID chronology
Renai (2004)	Hoshi no Miyako (2005)	Play (2006)

Singles from Hoshi no Miyako
- 1. "Sweet?" Released: October 12, 2005

Hoshi no Miyako (星の都) is the second studio album by Japanese visual kei rock band SID, released on November 16, 2005, by Danger Crue Records. It was released in two editions: regular and limited.

"Sweet?" is the only single of the album, released after "Paint pops", which is a box set containing a CD with songs included on the album: "Alibi", "Binetsu" and a DVD, with "Re:Dreamer" and "Aikagi".

== Commercial performance ==
Hoshi no Miyako reached number twenty-six on Oricon Albums Chart, remained for seven weeks and sold 16,402 copies while on chart. "Sweet?" reached twenty-third position on Oricon Singles Chart, staying for three weeks and selling 7,019 copies.

== Track listing ==
All lyrics are written by Mao.

No.	Title	Music	Length
1.	"Ringo Ame" (林檎飴)	Shinji	3:42
2.	"Alibi" (アリバイ)	Shinji	4:04
3.	"Sono Daishou" (その代償)	Shinji	4:26
4.	"Caramel" (キャラメル)	Aki	4:58
5.	"Aikagi" (合鍵)	Aki	4:53
6.	"Hoshi no Miyako" (星の都)	Yūya	3:57
7.	"Yell" (エール)	Aki	3:26
8.	"Sweet?"	Aki	4:05
9.	"Izon no Niwa" (依存の庭)	Aki	3:54
10.	"Toge no Neko" (刺と猫)	Aki	3:38
11.	"Binetsu" (微熱)	Aki	4:20
Total length:			45:28

== Personnel ==
- Mao – vocals
- Shinji – guitar
- Aki – bass
- Yūya – drums
