= Enamel (song) =

- Regular edition cover

Single by SID
- B-side: "Kagee (影絵)"
- Released: August 27, 2014
- Genre: Rock
- Length: 13:38
- Label: Ki/oon Records
- Songwriters: Mao, Aki

SID singles chronology
"hug" (2014)	"Enamel" (2014)	"White tree" (2014)

"Enamel" is the eighteenth single by Japanese visual kei rock band SID, released on August 27, 2014, by Ki/oon Records. It is the opening theme of Kuroshitsuji: Book of Circus.

== Background ==
In May, it was announced that Sid's new song "Enamel" would be used as the opening theme for Kuroshitsuji: Book of Circus. Sid had already composed the first opening theme of Kuroshitsuji saga, "Monochrome no Kiss". The B-side of "Enamel" is "Kagee" (影絵) and the third track is a live version of "Monochrome no Kiss", recorded on a tour celebrating Sid's 10th anniversary in 2013.

On July 3, a program about the anime, comments from Sid members and interviews with voice actors and producers of the anime aired.

Since April, the group has been on tour to promote the album Outsider. It ended on July 6 and was a mostly national tour, but featured one performance in Hong Kong and one in Taiwan.

== Songwriting ==
When writing the song, the band was asked to express themselves in accordance with the essence of the anime. Bassist Aki, the song's composer, said that there were no limitations when composing "Enamel" according to the image that the anime presents. He said that it was fun because he was already familiar with anime. He said: "Observing the appearance of four or five characters, I realized that they were related to Gothic. I was also inspired by the word "circus" in the title."

== Release ==
The single was released on August 27, 2014, more than a month after Kuroshitsuji aired, in four editions: the regular, limited edition (also called the Kuroshitsuji edition or anime edition) and the limited editions A and B. The regular edition only contains a three-track CD, the limited edition contains a shortened television version of Enamel, the limited edition A comes with a DVD along with the CD and the limited edition B comes with a photo booklet.

== Commercial performance ==
It reached number seven on Oricon Singles Chart and charted for nine weeks. On Billboard Japan Hot 100, reached number five.

CD Journal website described the single as a "dramatic song enveloped by the diversity of SID".

== Track listing ==
All lyrics are written by Mao.

No.	Title	Music	Length
1.	"Enamel"	Aki	3:36
2.	"Kagee" (影絵)	Aki	2:53
3.	"Monochrome no Kiss (ao vivo em Sid 10th Anniversary Tour 2013)" (モノクのキス)	Shinji	4:04

Limited edition

No.	Title	Length
1.	"Enamel"	3:36
2.	"Kagee" (影絵)	2:53
3.	"Monochrome no Kiss (live at Sid 10th Anniversary Tour 2013)" (モノクのキス)	4:04
4.	"Enamel -TV Ver.-"	1:33
5.	"Monochrome no Kiss -TV Ver.-" (モノクのキス)	1:31
Total length:		13:38

== Personnel ==
- Mao – vocals
- Shinji – guitar
- Aki – bass
- Yūya – drums
