= 仁愛 =

仁愛 or 인애 may refer to:

- Prince Inae, Korean Royal Prince
- Jen-Ai Hospital, Taiwanese hospital
- Jin-ai University, Japanese university
- Ren'ai (disambiguation), Chinese transliterated
