= Shōnin Yokkyū =

- Regular edition cover

Studio album by SID
- Released: September 4, 2019
- Genre: Rock
- Length: 40:31
- Language: Japanese
- Label: Ki/oon Records

SID chronology
Ichiban Suki na Basho (2018)	Shōnin Yokkyū (2019)	Umibe (2022)

Shōnin Yokkyū (承認欲求) is the tenth studio album by Japanese visual kei rock band SID, released on September 4, 2019, by Ki/oon Records.

== Promotion and release ==
The album and its release date were announced in July 2019, along with teaser images. A month before the premiere, four tracks were distributed for free for demonstration: "Blood Vessel", "Kimiiro no Asa", "Deai = Kiseki" and the title track "Shōnin Yokkyū", that had its music video was released on YouTube on the 21st. Additionally, a handshake event with the members was held for album pre-purchasers on September 7 and 8 in Tokyo and Osaka.

"Shōnin Yokkyū" was released on September 4 in three editions: the regular CD-only edition containing ten tracks, the limited edition A with a bonus DVD containing the music video for "Shōnin Yokkyū", and the limited edition B with a 32-page bonus booklet. A poster was distributed to the album's first buyers at Tsutaya, Tower Records and other affiliated stores.

The album was sponsored by the Sid Tour 2019 -Shōnin Yokkyū- from September to November 2019, while on YouTube the band showed videos of the tour diary. The full tour diaries video was given as a gift to fans who attended the last show at the Tokyo International Forum, which was added as an extra show earlier.

CD Journal website commented about the album: "With a challenging and glamorous musical style, this is a work that aims for even greater heights."

== Commercial performance ==
The album reached number five on Oricon Albums Chart, remaining on chart for five weeks. On Billboard Japan Hot Albums, it also reached fifth place.

== Track listing ==
No.	Title	Length
1.	"Shōnin Yokkyū" (承認欲求)	3:56
2.	"Blood Vessel"	3:42
3.	"Te" (手)	4:07
4.	"Deai = Kiseki" (デアイ＝キセキ)	3:36
5.	"See through"	4:14
6.	"Positive no Mahou" (ポジティブの魔法)	4:08
7.	"Awai Ashiato" (淡い足跡)	3:58
8.	"Trick"	3:02
9.	"Namida Ame" (涙雨)	4:43
10.	"Kimiiro no Asa" (君色の朝)	5:05
Total length:		40:31

== Personnel ==
- Mao – vocals
- Shinji – guitar
- Aki – bass
- Yūya – drums
