= Renai (album) =

Studio album by SID
- Released: December 22, 2004
- Genre: Rock
- Length: 45:03
- Language: Japanese
- Label: Danger Crue Records
- Producer: Sakura

SID chronology
Renai (2004)	Hoshi no Miyako (2005)

Renai (憐哀 -レンアイ-) is the debut album by Japanese visual kei rock band SID. It was released on December 22, 2004, by Danger Crue Records in two editions: regular and limited.

== Production ==
Renai was produced with Sakura, former drummer of L'Arc-en-Ciel. Guitarist Shinji said that at the time of recording the album, the band's schedule was tight and they had little time, so they created the melodies during train journeys. Mao said that these were the first lyrics he wrote. Despite being in a band before, he only did the vocals.

== Commercial performance ==
Renai reached number 44 on Oricon Albums Chart, remained on chart for 4 weeks and sold 11,547 copies while on chart.

== Track listing ==
All lyrics are written by Mao.

No.	Title	Music	Length
1.	"Ajisai" (紫陽花)	Shinji	4:56
2.	"Rinjin" (隣人)	Aki	3:37
3.	"Watashi wa Ame" (私は雨)	Shinji	4:32
4.	"Virtual Bansankai" (バーチャル晩餐会)	Shinji	3:10
5.	"Ao" (青)	Aki	5:07
6.	"Doyoubi no Onna" (土曜日の女)	Aki	3:15
7.	"Hitsuyouaku" (必要悪)	Aki	4:17
8.	"Akagami Shuffle" (赤紙シャッフォー)	Aki	3:58
9.	"Mousou Nikki" (妄想日記)	Shinji	3:50
10.	"Owakare no Uta" (お別れの唄)	Shinji	4:03
11.	"Kara (Kara) no Binsen, Sora (Sora) e no Tegami" (空(から)の便箋、空(そら)への手紙)	Shinji	4:13
Total length:			45:03

== Personnel ==
- Mao – vocals
- Shinji – guitar
- Aki – bass
- Yūya – drums
