= Uso (song) =

- Regular edition cover

Single by SID

from the album Hikari
- B-side: "Higasa"
- Released: April 29, 2009
- Genre: Pop rock
- Length: 12:14
- Label: Ki/oon Records

SID singles chronology
"2°C Me no Kanojo" (2009)	"Uso" (2009)	"one way" (2009)

Music video
- "Uso" on YouTube

"Uso" (嘘, lie) is a single by Japanese rock and visual kei band SID, released on April 29, 2009, by Ki/oon Records. It is used as the first ending theme of Fullmetal Alchemist: Brotherhood, and often considered the band's most successful song. It was included on the studio album Hikari and on Sid 10th Anniversary Best (which debuted at #1 on Oricon) and SID Anime Best 2008-2017 compilations. CD Journal website described the song as sentimental, nostalgic and melancholic and Natalie related it as "sad and beautiful".

Romi Park, voice actress of Fullmetal Alchemist's main character Edward Elric, covered "Uso" for the tribute album Sid Tribute Album -Anime Songs- (2023).

== Release ==
The release of "Uso" and the fact that it would be the ending theme of Fullmetal Alchemist were announced in March 2009. The song debuted in the series on April 5, 24 days before the official release. It was released on CD in three editions; a regular one with only the three tracks "Uso", the B-side "Higasa" (日傘) and a live recording of "Yuukan Collection", and two limited editions that include a different DVD each.

A year later, another Sid single was selected for Fullmetal Alchemist soundtrack: "Rain". On August 8, 2018, "Uso" was made available on several music streaming services along with all of the band's works.

== Commercial performance ==
It reached number two on Oricon Singles Chart and remained on chart for 17 weeks. On Tower Records' Japanese Rock and Pop Singles chart, its peak was third place.

It sold more than 170 thousand copies on CD, being certified gold disc by RIAJ. In the digital sphere, it reached gold in May 2009, platinum in July and double platinum in 2014, totaling more than 700 thousand paid downloads.

It became the 55th best-selling single of 2009 in Japan and the band's best-selling single, according to Oricon.

== Track listing ==
All lyrics are written by Mao.

No.	Title	Length
1.	"Uso" (嘘)	3:28
2.	"Higasa" (日傘)	5:11
3.	"Yuukan Collection - Live at Nippon Budokan 2008.11.2" (誘感コレクション （Live at 日本武道館 2008.11.2.）)	3:34
Total length:		12:14

== Personnel ==
- Mao – vocals
- Shinji – guitar
- Aki – bass
- Yūya – drums
