= Hikari (Sid album) =

- Regular edition cover

Studio album by SID
- Released: July 1, 2009
- Length: 43:35
- Language: Japanese
- Label: Ki/oon Music

SID chronology
Sentimental Macchiato (2008)	Hikari (2009)	Dead Stock (2011)

Singles from Hikari
- 1. "Monochrome no Kiss" Released: October 29, 2008; 2. "2°C Me no Kanojo" Released: January 14, 2009; 3. "Uso" Released: April 29, 2009

Hikari (stylized as hikari) is the fifth and first major studio album by Japanese visual kei rock band SID, released on July 1, 2009 by Ki/oon Music. The single "Uso" is an ending theme of Fullmetal Alchemist: Brotherhood and "Monochrome no Kiss" is the first opening theme of Black Butler.

== Commercial performance ==
Hikari reached number two on Oricon Albums Chart. In July 2009, it was certified gold disc by RIAJ. As of July 8, 2009, it has sold more than 150,000 copies. It was the 76th best-selling album in Japan in 2009.

== Touring ==
The album release tour, named "<hikari>", began on July 14, 2009 and was attended by around 70,000 people in 26 locations across Japan.

== Track listing ==
All lyrics are written by Mao.

No.	Title	Music	Length
1.	"Rakuen" (落園)	Yūya	4:16
2.	"Mousou Nikki 2" (妄想日記2)	Shinji	3:51
3.	"Uso" (嘘)	Yūya	3:25
4.	"Circus" (サーカス)	Aki	3:36
5.	"Nakidashita Onna to Kyomukan" (泣き出した女と虚無感)	Aki	3:57
6.	"Monochrome no Kiss" (モノクロのキス)	Shinji	3:59
7.	"Tsumiki Kuzushi" (罪木崩し)	Yūya	3:43
8.	"2°C Me no Kanojo" (2 °C目の彼女)	Shinji	4:13
9.	"Capsule"	Aki	3:43
10.	"Drama" (ドラマ)	Aki	3:49
11.	"Hikari" (光)	Aki	5:04
Total length:			43:35

== Personnel ==
- Mao - vocals
- Shinji - guitar
- Aki - bass
- Yūya - drums
