= Monochrome no Kiss =

Single by SID

from the album Hikari
- Released: October 29, 2008
- Genre: Rock
- Length: 12:41
- Label: Ki/oon Records
- Songwriters: Mao, Aki, Shinji

SID singles chronology
"Namida no Ondo" (2005)	"Monochrome no Kiss" (2008)	"2°C Me no Kanojo" (2009)

Music video
- "Monochrome no Kiss" on YouTube

"Monochrome no Kiss" (モノクロのキス) is a single by Japanese band Sid, released on October 29, 2008, by Ki/oon Records. It is the first theme song of Black Butler. "Monochrome no Kiss" was included on the album Hikari and on Sid 10th Anniversary Best and SID Anime Best 2008-2017 compilations.

The single was released as the band's first work on a major label and Sid's first anime song. It won the 31st Anime Grand Prix in best anime song category.

== Commercial performance ==
"Monochrome no Kiss" reached number four on Oricon Singles Chart and charted for 27 weeks.

By January 2009, the single had sold around 100,000 physical copies. In May 2009, it was certified gold by RIAJ for selling more than 100,000 digital copies. In January 2017, became platinum after exceeding 250,000 copies.

== Track listing ==
All lyrics are written by Mao.

No.	Title	Music	Length
1.	"Monochrome no Kiss" (モノクロのキス)	Shinji	4:00
2.	"season"	Aki	4:25
3.	"and boyfriend (live in Yoyogi National Gymnasium)"	Yūya	4:15
Total length:			12:41

== Personnel ==
- Mao – vocals
- Shinji – guitar
- Aki – bass
- Yūya – drums
