= Sid (band) =

Japanese visual kei rock band

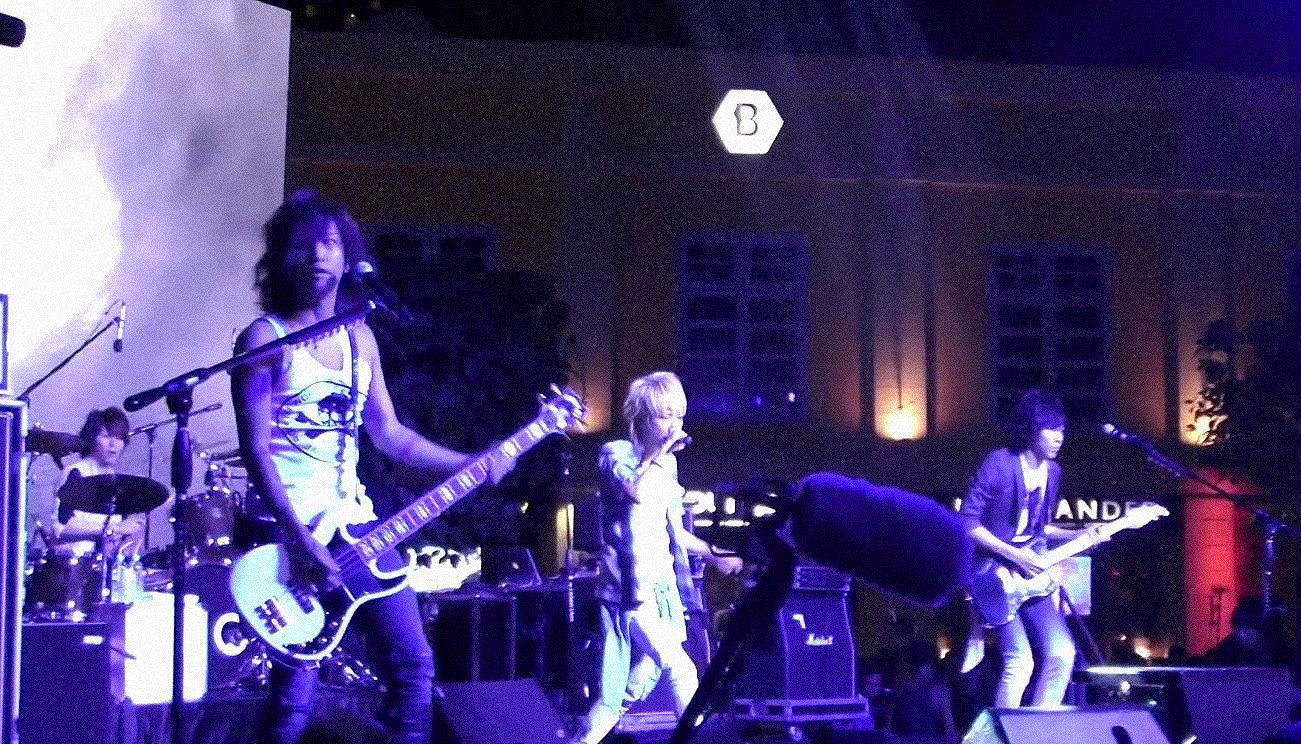
- Sid performing in Singapore (2013)

Background information
- Origin: Japan
- Genres: Alternative rock; pop rock; hard rock
- Years active: 2003–present
- Labels: Danger Crue Records; Ki/oon
- Members: Mao; Shinji; Aki; Yūya
- Website: sid-web.info

Sid (シド, Shido) (stylized in all caps when romanized) is a Japanese visual kei rock band, formed in 2003 and signed to Ki/oon Records. Formed by Mao, Shinji, Aki and Yūya, they are known for producing anime songs, such as for Fullmetal Alchemist, Bleach, Black Butler, and Magi.

Their first album, Renai, was produced with Sakura (ex. L'Arc~en~Ciel). After reaching Oricon chart top 5 for the first time with "Mitsuyubi" (2007), Sid made their major label debut in 2008 with "Monochrome no Kiss" and the gold disc Hikari, which includes one of their most famous songs "Uso". In 2010, they won the Billboard Japan Top Pop Artist award and reached the top of Oricon with Sid 10th Anniversary Best compilation. Later, they also produced songs for other artists, such as LiSA.

== Career ==
=== 2003–2007: Formation and early years ===
Sid was founded in 2003 by vocalist Mao (ex-Shula) and bassist Aki (ex-Ram Rem). They were joined by two support members, guitarist Shinji (ex-Uranus) and drummer Yuuya (ex-Shula). The four of them released the band's first demo CD, Yoshigai Manabu 17-sai (Mushoku) (吉開学 17歳 (無職)), on mini-disc that August and soon after, they signed on with Danger Crue Records.

Though Sid technically began in 2003, the band considers January 14, 2004 the date of their 'birth' as it was announced at their show at the Meguro Rock May Kan that Shinji and Yuuya would be joining as official members. With their line-up now complete, they released their first single "Kaijou-Ban"(会場限定盤) in March before traveling overseas for a two-day performance at the American convention Anime Central in May.

Sid heated back up in the winter months, releasing their first full album, Renai (レンアイ), and taking part in both their label-sponsored 'tenka' event put on every Christmas and the Beauti-Fool's Fest 04 event sponsored by Fool's Mate magazine. They continued to participate in lives and events well into the next year, which included their first one-man tour. The release of their second album followed. The band started off small, but not without a certain charming flair. Where most bandsmen handed out fliers, they also used megaphones as a means of personal promotion. Despite having only a small collection of songs to offer, they worked relentlessly to produce more. Their releases varied widely in style and composition, and the band made it an obvious goal to appeal to a broad audience - a plan which obviously worked. Sid grew rapidly in their initial years, at a rate which surprised numerous publications and notoriously earned them the title "the monster band of the indie scene".

2006 was a big year for Sid: they broke into the Oricon top ten for the first time with their summer single, "Chapter 1", and they were able to play a one-man at the famous Nippon Budokan live hall. They finished the year with the release of their third album, play, and a new one-man tour that took them throughout Japan. The following year brought a slew of new singles, including September's "Mitsuyubi" (蜜指), which was the band's first to reach the Oricon top five.

=== 2008–2016: Major debut ===
In early 2008, Sid announced they would be going major with Sony Records and later put out "Monochrome no Kiss" (モノクロのキス), their debut major single. The single’s title track was used for the opening of anime Black Butler and the release was also available in four versions, one which was a special Kuroshitsuji version featuring the two main characters on a cardboard sleeve. Their debut concert at Nippon Budokan sold out in under two minutes in November 2008.

Their next single, titled "2°C me no kanojo" (2°C目の彼女), came out in January 2009, and three months later "Uso" (嘘) debuted at number two on the Oricon charts and was also used as the 1st ending theme song of Fullmetal Alchemist: Brotherhood. Their other recent releases also seem to be used for popular anime, so anticipate many more songs to be used for original soundtracks. Their first major album, Hikari, was released on July 1, 2009, and will serve as the primary set list for what will be their largest tour to date. Another single named, "One Way" was released on 11. November which reached 3rd in the Oricon Charts.

On March 3, 2010, Sid released their Single "Sleep" and announced their performance at Saitama Super Arena on July 31 in a special CM on TV Asahi program "Ikinari!Ogon Densetsu" on February 11, subsequently selling out 30,000 tickets in just one day. Sid's song "Rain (雨)" is the fifth opening theme and sixth ending theme for Fullmetal Alchemist: Brotherhood. Released on June 2, 2010, "Rain" ranked No.1 on the Oricon Daily charts on June 4 and 5, marking the first time Sid has ever placed No. 1 on the daily charts. "Rain" is Sid's second contribution to the Fullmetal Alchemist anime franchise, making them one of only two artists contributing more than one song for the series (the other being L'Arc-en-Ciel). However, on the weekly charts "Rain" was ranked No.2. On September 29, 2010 they released a new single titled "Cosmetic" and performed at Tokyo Dome on December 11, 2010. On 2010 December 1 they released a single, "Ranbu no Melody" (乱舞のメロディ) which was used as the 13th opening theme song of Bleach from episodes 292 to 316.

They got the Top Pop Artist Award from Billboard Japan Music Awards 2010 on February 6, 2011. They also participated in Kuroyume's tribute album, Fuck the Border Line which was released on February 9. The song Sid did is "Yasashii Higeki" a song by Kuroyume that was released in 1995. A DVD with footage from their live at Saitama Super Arena and Tokyo Dome was released and is available in 3D on Blu-ray. The DVD also placed 3rd on Oricon weekly. Their new single entitled "Itsuka", was followed by another performance at Nippon Budokan on October 4. Their 7th DVD, Sidnad Vol.7: dead stock tour 2011 was released on the next day. "Itsuka" reached No. 1 on the daily charts and placed second on the weekly charts.

On December 28, 2011 Sid released "Fuyu no Bench". Sid performed at the Ontama Carnival on January 29, 2012. Their single "S" was decided to become the theme of Sadako 3D and an image song for the 2013 film adaptation of Carrie. Their single "VIP" was released on 21 November 2012, and is the opening theme for the anime adaptation of the manga Magi: The Labyrinth of Magic. Another single, "Anniversary" was used as the opening theme for the second season of the series, Magi: The Kingdom of Magic. On March 6, 2013, Sid released their M&W Tour Live Concert in DVD form [Sidnad Vol.8 ～Tour 2012 M&W～]

On April 6, 2013, Sid held the live event for their commemorative 10th Anniversary of Sid at Yokohama Stadium.

On May 24, 2013 Sid also performed in Singapore for the first time at the Music Matters Live 2013 event. They release their new single "Summer Lover" on 24 July 2013 followed by 2 other side single included in the album Side B Complete Collection on August 21, 2013. The two tracks mentioned are Celebrity and Sense. On July 27, 2013, Sid make a tour for their 10th Anniversary Live, first at Fukuoka; then at Sendai on August 3, 2013, Osaka on August 10, 2013, and finally at Fuji-Q Highland, Yamanashi on 24–25 August 2013.

On December 11, 2013, Sid released their live DVD during Yokohama Concert, consisting of 22 songs included 『Sidnad Vol.9 ~Yokohama Stadium~』<10th Anniversary Live> and later on December 27, 2013, Sid held the final live event in 2013, commemorating their 10th Anniversary Projects in Nippon Budokan [Visual Bang! Sid 10th Anniversary Final Party] where they invited other artists such as Ayabie, R-Shitei, Alice Project, Kameleo, Zoro, DIV, Daizystripper, Dog in the PWO, v[New] and Moran. On February 12, 2014, Sid released their new single "hug".

On August 27, 2014, Sid's Enamel was released and it was used for the opening title in Black Butler: Book of Circus.

=== 2017–present: "Rasen no Yume" and "Glass no Hitomi" ===
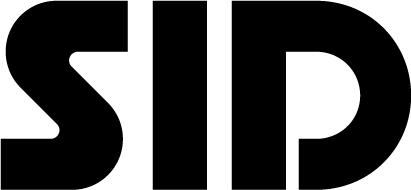
Sid's current logo.

On May 13, 2017, Sid created the new song "Rasen no Yume" (Spiral Dream) for the anime adaptation of Altair: A Record of Battles. The song's CD single went on sale on August 2, 2017 in three versions (a limited first pressing with a DVD, a standard edition, and a limited standard pressing with an anime illustration).

In 2018, Sid participated in the festival Lunatic Fest hosted by Luna Sea on June 23 and released their first EP in August, Ichiban Suki na Basho. On September 4, 2019, the group released the album Need of Approval (承認欲求, Shōnin Yokkyū) in three editions as usual. On early 2020, they provided a cover of "Jupiter" for the January 29, 2020 Buck-Tick tribute album Parade III ~Respective Tracks of Buck-Tick~. They also played in a tribute album to Granrodeo released in May, with a cover of "Infinite Love".

Sid played their first online show amid the COVID-19 pandemic in 2021, broadcast on several websites on January 14. In the same month, the song "Zakuro" by the fictional band Fantôme Iris, written by Shinji, Mao and Cazqui (ex. Nocturnal Bloodlust), was released. Sid was responsible for writing most of the virtual band's songs. In November, they paused their live performances due to Mao's health problems. In 2022 they composed the opening theme for Japanese version of Heaven Official's Blessing, "Jiu no Kuchizuke", featured on Umibe album that premiered on March 23. Sid resumed the live shows in January 2023 and started the celebrations at 20 years of the band's career, releasing a box set with all the albums and singles (after "Enamel") and officially uploading their music videos on YouTube.

== Members ==
- Mao – vocals
- Shinji – guitar
- Aki – bass guitar
- Yuya – drums, percussion

== Discography ==
- Renai (2004)
- Hoshi no Miyako (2005)
- Play (2006)
- Sentimental Macchiato (2008)
- Hikari (2009)
- Dead Stock (2011)
- M&W (2012)
- Outsider (2014)
- Nomad (2017)
- Shōnin Yokkyū (2019)
- Umibe (2022)

== Awards ==
| Year | Prize | Category | Nominee | Result |
|---|---|---|---|---|
| 2008 | 31° Anime Grand Prix | Best Anime Song | "Monochrome no Kiss" | Won |
| 2010 | Billboard Japan Music Awards | Top Pop Artist | SID | Won |
