= Mao (Japanese singer) =

- Born: October 23
- Origin: Kurume, Fukuoka, Japan
- Genres: J-pop; rock
- Occupation: Singer
- Years active: 1995–present
- Website: www.maofromsid.com

Mao (マオ; born October 23) is a Japanese male singer, known for being the lead singer of visual kei rock band SID and writer of all the lyrics.

SID became popular in Japan in mid-2010 with the album Hikari, which includes the anime songs "Monochrome no Kiss" and "Uso" with lyrics written by Mao. He began a solo career in 2016 using the name Mao from SID, debuting at the top 10 of Oricon charts.

On July 3, 2021, he was appointed ambassador of his hometown, Kurume.

== Career ==
=== 1995–2008: Early years and SID ===
Mao joined his first band in high school and moved to Tokyo with the group. After creating a band called Dildo around 1995, he formed Shula in 1999. The band had three members (vocalist, guitarist and bassist) and had a pop-oriented musical style and visual kei costumes. Due to the band's lack of popularity, the members began to fall out and the group disbanded in 2003. In May of the same year, Mao invited Aki, who also felt that his previous band was not doing well, to form the band Sid, which initially played covers of Kuroyume. Guitarist Shinji and drummer Yuuya (who was also from Shula) were supporting members until they were officially added to the group in 2004. In an interview with Zy magazine in 2008, Mao talked about the band's beginnings: he reported that Sid's popularity was growing quickly compared to his previous band, and to increase the number of fans, they did a lot of live performances because they didn't have enough money for media advertisements. In June 2007, Mao and the others started an Ameba blog, and his blog became one of the ten most popular blogs at that time.

On March 3, 2010, Mao released his first book, The Aesthetics of Single-Stroke Drawing (一筆書きの美学, Ippitsugaki no bigaku), which was serialized in Pati Pati magazine, showcasing his trip to South Korea. A sequel was released on December 7, 2012, The Aesthetics of Single-Stroke Drawing 2, this time showing a trip to Taiwan.

=== 2016–present: Debut as a solo artist ===
In June 2016, the singer began a solo career under the name Mao from SID. His first release was the single "Tsuki/Hoshi" available in three editions. On September 28, he released the debut album Maison de M with 6 tracks and hosted a digital Q&A and autograph event, which fans could join by lottery. For the release of both works, he also hosted an in-person event to meet fans in several stores across the country. According to the Barks website, the single event attracted around 40,000 fans. The album features a "lush Latin jazz sound" according to Alexey Eremenko of Allmusic.

In 2017, Mao wrote the lyrics for LiSA's song "Ash", theme song of Fate/Apocrypha anime. He also held a solo show at Tsutaya-O West called Whiteday, which was repeated exactly one year later, featuring support members Nishi-ken (keyboards), Daisuke Kadowaki (violin) and Yasuo Kijima (guitar). In 2019, he embarked on an acoustic tour with 6 dates from July 17th to 30th with two shows per day: the first with female covers and the second with male covers.

The singer's first solo performance in livestream format was made on August 29, 2020 amid the COVID-19 pandemic. He participated on Ryuichi Kawamura's album Beautiful Lie, released in January 2021, providing the lyrics for the first track "Kiseki no Chizu". Following the pandemic's aftermath, Mao wrote a self-help book published through Gentosha on May 12, called The Magic of Positivity (ポジティブの魔法, Positive no Mahō).

The singer canceled his Christmas solo performance in November 2021, and in January 2022 he officially suspended his activities for treatment as he was not in good health. Mao resumed his career in January 2023 when Sid performed an exclusive show for fan club members.

In April 2024, Mao restarted his solo career, this time using just Mao as name. He announced a new album, Habit, and released a music video teaser for the track "ROUTE209". In June, he began a solo tour with his support band Nishi-ken (keyboards), Leda (guitar), Shoyo (bass) and DUTTCH (drums).

== Personal life ==
Mao was born in Kurume, Fukuoka Prefecture on October 23, but has revealed neither his year of birth nor his real name. He moved to Tokyo a year after completing high school and took a part-time job at a Coco Ichibanya restaurant. He learned to sing and perform his vocal techniques on his own, but began taking formal singing lessons in 2010.

The singer's biggest influence is the band Kuroyume and its vocalist Kiyoharu, with his vocal style inspired by him. In the April 2011 issue of Fool's Mate magazine, he said he became a fan after a friend introduced him to the single "Ice My Life".

Mao revealed in 2015 that two years earlier he was diagnosed with Ménière's disease, and after contracting gastroenteritis, he underwent surgery to remove polyps from his vocal cords.

== Discography ==
Studio albums

- Maison de M (September 28, 2016), Oricon peak position: 8
- Habit (May 29, 2024), Oricon peak position: 17

Live albums

- Maison de M vol.1 in Billboard Live Tokyo (March 29, 2017)

EPs

- Yahan no Jyūsei (July 2, 2025), Oricon peak position: 31

Singles

- "Tsuki/Hoshi" (June 22, 2016), Oricon peak position: 4

== Books ==
- The Aesthetics of Single-Stroke Drawing (一筆書きの美学, Ippitsugaki no bigaku) (March 2, 2010)
- The Aesthetics of Single-Stroke Drawing 2 (一筆書きの美学II, Ippitsugaki no bigaku II) (December 7, 2012)
- The Magic of Positivity (ポジティブの魔法, Positive no Mahō) (May 12, 2021)
