= List of Altair: A Record of Battles episodes =

Altair: A Record of Battles is an anime television series based on the manga series of the same title written and illustrated by Kotono Katō. The series aired from July 7 to December 22, 2017, on MBS TV's "Animeism" programming block and ran for two cour (two quarters of a year).

For the first cour (Episodes 1–13), the opening theme is "Rasen no Yume" (螺旋のユメ, Spiral Dream) by rock band SID, who created the song specifically for the anime television. The ending theme is "Taiyō no Elegy" (たいようの哀悼歌(エレジー), Elegy for the Sun) by pop girl group FLOWER. For the second half (Episodes 14–24), the opening theme song is "赫色 -akairo-" by three-piece band CIVILIAN and ending theme is "Windy" by R&B duo CHEMISTRY.

== Episodes ==
No.	Title (Note: All English titles are taken from Anime Strike.)	Original release date
1	"The Golden Eagle General"; Transliteration: "Inu washi no Shōgun" (Japanese: 犬鷲の将軍)	July 7, 2017
After being newly appointed as Pasha, Mahmut spends some time at a festival with his friend, Ibrahim, and meets Shara, a dancer who Ibrahim is friends with. The next day, Mahmut is called into the Divan to discuss the Balt-Rhein Empire's demands after an empire minister, Franz, is found dead at Turkey's border. One Pasha, Zağanos, knows this a ploy for the empire to invade Turkey and proposes a preemptive strike at them. Wanting to avoid war, Mahmut investigates the incident and figures out that the arrows that killed Franz was made by Balt-Rhein. Meanwhile, Mahmut's mentor and foster father, Halil, volunteers to act as a scapegoat for the assassination as Prime Minister Louis (the instigator of the conspiracy) secretly orders his men to kill Halil before he arrives to the empire. Mahmut is able to outwit and apprehend the assassins, presenting them to Emperor Goldbalt XI and resolves the incident without any consequences. Undaunted by this failure, Louis begins manipulating the Araba Tribe to take over Hisar.
2	"The Citadel City"; Transliteration: "Toride no Machi" (Japanese: 砦の町)	July 14, 2017
Mahmut and the Divan are informed that Hisar village is rebelling against Turkey with the Araba Tribe and that Ibrahim is leading it since he is Hisar's Vali. As Hisar falls under his jurisdiction, Zağanos takes responsibility to stop the rebellion with his troops, knowing Balt-Rhein will use the rebellion as an opportunity to invade. Using Araba clothes to blend in, Mahmut and Shara goes to Hisar to investigate and discover that Ibrahim is being force to obey the empire's agents, Röd Orm, and the Araba Tribe because they are holding Hisar citizens hostage in an oil-soaked tent. Wanting to help his friend, Mahmut tells the Araba Tribe that they are being used by the empire and lures a Röd Orm member into a fight in an empty alley, but is beaten and disarmed. Meanwhile, Zağano receives news that 40,000 Arabas are marching towards Hisar, outnumbering his troops and halting his siege plans. Nearby, Goldbalt IX's niece, Duchess Lelederik, and her aide, Glalat, prepare to attack Hisar on Louis's orders.
3	"The Council of Generals"; Transliteration: "Shōgun kaigi" (Japanese: 将軍会議)	July 21, 2017
Outside Hisar, Lelederik and Glalat grow impatient and plan to act on their own, killing the Röd Orm agent with them so he does not interfere. With 40,000 Arabas on their way, Zağanos contemplates on using poison to stop them. Inside Hisar, the Arabas question a Röd Orm agent, Eleanor, who threatens to burn the hostages and make the Araba Tribe take the blame. On Mahmut's orders, Shara cuts some of the robes off the oil-soaked tent, allowing Iskender (Mahmut's golden eagle) and a large flock of eagles to lift the tent off and free the hostages. Ibrahim takes the chance to allow Zağanos's army to enter and retake Hisar as Mahmut kills his Röd Orm opponent and Lelederik's group retreats. Despite aiding Balt-Rhein, Mahmut convinces Zağanos to let the Araba Tribe go free so they can tell the other Arabas how the empire manipulated them and spread the truth around. At the Divan meeting, Ibrahim and Zağanos are reinstated, but Mahmut is demoted to Binbashi for acting alone and is placed under Halil's command. Mahmut speculates that Turkey is on the brink of war and learns from Zağanos that he knew of the empire's movements from the beginning due his spy network. With Halil's blessing and a special charm to communicate with Zağanos's spies, Mahmut sets out on a journey to see more of the world. Meanwhile, Louis has tasked Röd Orm to dismantle Zağanos's spy network.
4	"The Eagle's Joint Struggle"; Transliteration: "Inu washi no Kyōtō" (Japanese: 犬鷲の共闘)	July 28, 2017
After having a nightmare of the Tuğril tribe massacre, Mahmut returns to his hometown, which been rebuilt since its destruction. After paying his respect to the dead, Mahmut uses Zağanos's Pyramis charm at the village's water shrine and comes into contact with the spy, Barbaros. He explains to Mahmut how the spy network works and that Turkey spies has been getting killed by Röd Orm on Louis's orders. Barbaros directs him to meet the spy network's chief, Süleyman, who is a survivor of the Tuğril tribe. Süleyman tells Mahmut his background, how he met Zağanos, and how he became the chief of the spy network. Some Röd Orm agents, led by Eleanor, track down Barbaros and attempt to kill him, but Süleyman and Mahmut arrive to help him. Due to Mahmut's recklessness, the trio retreat and Süleyman berates him for acting alone without considering his comrades. In another confrontation, the group is able to beat the Röd Orm agents, but Eleanor manages to escape. After cleaning up the mess Röd Orm made, Süleyman informs Mahmut that Balt-Rhein has all of Turkey spies in their territory killed and plans to meet with Zağanos to devise countermeasures. Süleyman encourages Mahmut to earn his Pasha rank back and see more of the world. Later, Mahmut travels to Rumeliana's oldest port city, Phoiníkē.
5	"The City of the Lighthouse"; Transliteration: "Tōdai no Miyako" (Japanese: 燈台の都)	August 18, 2017
Mahmut arrives at Phoiníkē and sees a Balt-Rhein ship docked at the harbor. He meets with the Turkey spy, Kyros, who informs him that he will find trouble during his stay. Mahmut is summoned by the patriotic Magistros Konstantinos and other members of the Phoiníkē senate, who request that Mahmut to sit in at the senate assembly to discuss the empire's demands to cede their harbor to them. While Caesar Apollodorus wants to accept the empire's demands, Konstantinos states it is an excuse to invade and gain control over the Centro sea. After the rest of senate vote to go to war, Phoiníkē engages in a siege against Balt-Rhein led by Glalat, who has no success in breaching the city's protective walls for fifteen days. While the senate discuss the absence of Phoiníkē 's nation ally Venedik, who they signaled for aid days ago, Mahmut understands Phoiníkē will lose unless Venedik sends reinforcements. Knowing that empire's influence will surround Turkey on all sides if they win, Mahmut volunteers to travel to Venedik and get aid, but is turned down. While talking to Kyros, who reveals that Apollodorus is his father, Mahmut learns of how Kyros met Süleyman and convinces him to give him a ship to travel to Venedik. Meanwhile, Lelederik and her mountain infantry unit prepare to scale the crystal cliffs in attempt to invade Phoiníkē.
6	"The Iron Chains"; Transliteration: "Kurogane no Kusari" (Japanese: 黒鉄の鎖)	August 25, 2017
As the siege continues, Konstantinos berates Apollodorus for not assisting in the war effort and the two argue over if going to war against Balt-Rhein was the right decision, given how citizens from nations that the empire has annexed are cruelly treated. At night, Glalat prepares the army for their next attack, uncaring for the lives for his men and conscripted soldiers to enact his plans. Mahmut meets up with Kyros and his crew to sail to Venedik, and then goes to lower the harbor chains so they can leave. Over the speaking tubes channel, they learn that a group of conscripted soldiers from Balt-Rhein surrender to Phoiníkē and ask for asylum. After seeing Glalat ordering men to attack the dissenters, Konstantinos and the rest of the senate agree to take the dissenters in and lower the harbor chains. However, one of Glalat's ships manage to enter the harbor before they could raise the chains again. Kyros and Mahmut use their ship to take on and subdue Glalat and his men. Glalat frees himself and escaped as Mahmut and the crew witness city being set ablaze by imperials soldiers led by Lelederik, who were able to scale the crystal cliffs.
7	"The Sinking City"; Transliteration: "Koto kanraku" (Japanese: 古都陥落)	August 25, 2017 (Note: Episodes 6 and 7 aired as an hour special.)
As everyone looks on in horror as Phoiníkē burns, Konstantinos tries to rally soldiers to defend the city, but Apollodorus sabotage the speaking tubes and scolds him for not seeing the reality of the situation. In order to save the citizens from slaughter, Apollodorus and the senate agree to surrender to Balt-Rhein and relay the message to everyone in the city. Kyros prepares to smuggle Mahmut to safety, but his friends urges him to escape with Mahmut and return once he is ready to retake their homeland. With Apollodorus promising to take full responsibility of the war, an angry and guilt-ridden Konstantinos confronts Lelederik and warns her that the empire's aggression will be their downfall before getting killed. As Mahmut and Kyros escape the city, they are picked up by Venedik ships led by Captain Silvestro Brega, who Mahmut angrily questions why they never arrive to help Phoiníkē before collapsing from his wounds he sustained from his battle with Glalat. For the next few days, Mahmut rests inside Abiriga's (Brega's first mate) room and read books about Venedik while contemplating everything he has been through. Meanwhile, Kyros gathers information and spies on the Venedik crew, reporting everything he learns to Mahmut. As Mahmut and Kyros resolve to continue to travel together, the group arrives at Venedik. Mahmut and Kyros goes to meet with the city-state's ruler, Doge Antonio Lucio, and inquire why he betrayed their pact with Phoiníkē.
8	"Masquerade of Sincerity"; Transliteration: "Shisei no Kamen geki" (Japanese: 至誠の仮面劇)	September 1, 2017
Mahmut and Kyros learn the reason for Venedik's abandonment of Phoiníkē was to avoid making an enemy out of Balt-Rhein. While they accuse Doge Lucio for betraying the pact, Lucio pragmatically explains the loophole in the alliance and that they are willing to conduct business with the empire to continue to use the Phoiníkē's crystals for their trade. Later, Mahmut and Kyros meet with Abiriga, who takes them to Cecelia Brega's bar. He tells them that are no spies within the city because Venedik citizens are solely loyal to their home and will always work towards the nation's interests. Abiriga also reveals his past as a runaway slave and how he was taken in by the Bregas. Abiriga is then confronted by a man, Mora, who loaned him money to invested in the Colonna company, who just loss their cargo, and demands him to repay his debts. Since Abiriga broke the laws by investing in another company, he is to be exiled from Venedik. After finding out Abiriga was "set up" by Mora, Mahmut earns money by playing chess matches to pay Abiriga's debts to Captain Brega and Mora. The next day, Mahmut and Kyros learn everything that happened was a ruse to test Mahmut's worth. Captain Brega states Venedik might want to forge an alliance with Turkey one day and they want Abiriga to travel with Mahmut to act as a liaison. Mahmut agrees to take Abiriga with him and uses the money to purchase his services. As Doge Lucio and Captain Brega watch the group's departure, Mahmut realizes Venedik citizens are not as cold-hearted as they appear and wonders what Doge Lucio expect from him in the future.
9	"The Red Tiger Sultan"; Transliteration: "Beni Tora no Shō-ō" (Japanese: 紅虎の将王)	September 8, 2017
Days after Phoiníkē's fall, the Turkey Stratocracy and its vassals states (Mızrak, Balta, Biçki, and Kiliç) gather at the Divan to vote to make war preparations against Balt-Rhein. However, all the sultans of the four stratocracies voted against the collaboration, much to Zağanos's frustration, who wants to get rid of the sultans. Another Pasha, Tesisat-Kapı Saruça, believes that the Sultanates are showing defiance because they are unsatisfied with their unequal rights. In the Mızrak stratocracy, Mahmut and company are in Liman city and visit the water shrine to figure out what is going in Mızrak after seeing a weapons dealer around the town. Underneath the closed off water shrine, Mahmut and co. meet Beyazit and Ayşe, brother to Mızrak's sultan Balaban and daughter of Balta's sultan Fatma, respectively. Beyazit is also part of Zağanos's spy network and informs Mahmut about Divan meeting that took place, and how they both oppose the sultans' recent actions. Mahmut meets with Balaban, who expresses his disdain being under for the Turkey Stratocracy's authority. Afterwards, Balaban burns down the water shrine since Beyazit and Ayşe refuse to surrender to him, not knowing the two have already escaped. Hearing of Beyazit's opposition, Zağanos convinces majority of the Divan to vote to secretly overthrow the sultans, appointing Mahmut with this task and sends Süleyman to relay the orders. As Balaban takes Mahmut and his companions to his palace, he secretly meets with Eleanor, revealing that Balaban has been conspiring with the empire. At night, Mahmut and company are able to escape the palace, but is soon found out by Eleanor and other Röd Orm agents.
10	"Dance of the Moonlit Beauty"; Transliteration: "Gekka kajin no Mai" (Japanese: 月下佳人の舞)	September 15, 2017
With Röd Orm's presence in Mızrak, Mahmut deduces Louis is behind the four stratocracies' opposition of Turkey. After fighting off Röd Orm and evading the Mızrak Cavalry, Mahmut and his group meet up with Süleyman, Beyazit, and Ayşe. Süleyman relays Mahmut the Divan's orders to start a rebellion against the current sultans and replace them with new rulers that will support the Greater Turkey federation. The group travels to the Biçki Stratocracy's capital and finds that there are wanted posters for them. After sneaking into the city, they learn that Biçki's Sultan Uzun is building a trade route with the empire. In order to recruit allies, Mahmut orders Süleyman and Beyazit to stay in Biçki and search for a replacement ruler while he and the rest go to the Kiliç Stratocracy to meet with Ayşe's betrothed, Orhan. They have Orhan set up a meeting with his father, Sultan Selim, who imprisoned them in order deceive Röd Orm and Mızrak spies. Later, Selim secretly visits Mahmut and co. and explains that he was coerced into conspiring with Balaban and Balt-Rhein since Kiliç is a weaker nation. Upon Ayşe's suggestion, Mahmut, Selim, and the others plan to wed Orhan and Ayşe to entice an assassination should the other sultans attend or have Selim step down as sultan once Orhan is married. Meanwhile, Süleyman and Beyazit are captured by Ismail, Uzun's 45th son, who wants to join forces with them. He explains find the road construction unbenefical and support Biçki's alliance with Turkey. When Ismail hears the lack the necessary soldiers for a rebellion, Beyazit secretly shows Ismail that he owns 77 matchlock guns, which will even the odds against the sultans, and wins his cooperation.
11	"The Prince of Swords"; Transliteration: "Ken no Shō Taishi" (Japanese: 剣の将太子)	September 22, 2017
With preparations for Orhan and Ayşe's wedding and the assassination underway, Ismail voices concerns about gaining public approval since the new rulers will claim the thrones dishonorably. To remedy any backlash, Mahmut contacts Shara and has her theater troupe, Lir Esnaf, put on a play and have them spread their propaganda throughout the four stratocracies. Meanwhile, the Divan selects Tesisat-Kapı Saruça and a handful of other Pashas known for their pro-sultans leanings to represent the Turkey Stratocracy at the wedding. However, Saruça refuses to believe the sultans are conspiring with Balt-Rhein and heads to Mızrak to tell Balaban about the assassination plot. As he consolidates his forces, Balaban reflects on his father's death and how his desire for Mızrak's independence formed. Hearing about Saruça's location, Zağanos convinces the Divan to use this opportunity to send their armies to the other three sultanates and capture the capitals while the sultans are in Kiliç. During a private moment, Ayşe confesses to Beyazit how she thought that they would marry one day. Having overheard their talk, a heartbroken Orhan and Selim also share a tender moment, where Selim encourages Orhan to become a sultan worthy of Ayşe. On the day of the wedding, Mahmut and co. see that all three armies of Mızrak, Balta, and Biçki, marching upon Kiliç. As Kiliç is outmatched, Selim plans to turn Ayşe and others over to Balaban to appease him. When Selim attempts to kill Ayşe, Orhan kills his father, who leaves Orhan with words of encouragement as he dies. Orhan announces to his army that he is Kiliç's new sultan, and orders his men to release Mahmut and cooperate with him to defend the city against Balaban and his forces.
12	"Battle at the Unusual Rock Formation"; Transliteration: "Kigan Kaisen" (Japanese: 奇岩会戦)	September 29, 2017
In a series of flashbacks, Louis persuades Balaban to join forces with Balt-Rhein, appealing to Balaban's long-sought dream of independence from Greater Turkey. Concerned for his ambitious brother, Beyazit approach Zağanos to become one of his spies to safeguard his homeland and keep Balaban from going down a dark path. Present day, Mahmut explains to the others that the Divan is planning to take the other sultanates' capitals, thus they cannot expect reinforcements from Turkey. While being greatly outnumbered, Mahmut plans to face Balaban's armies head-on as Ismail and Beyazit prepare to use their matchlock guns. After killing Tesisat-Kapı Saruça, Balaban heads to the front lines and chooses to use the same number of men as Mahmut's army to have a more honorable battle, sending word to Fatma and Uzun not to interfere. Knowing that Balaban is the only real threat and the other sultans would crumble without him, Mahmut deploys a series of tactics to easily overcome Balaban and his Yeñiçeri and lure the remaining forces into a valley. Cutting off their escape routes, Beyazit and his soldiers guns down the rest of Yeñiçeri until Balaban is left alone. Choosing to deal with his brother by himself, Beyazit fatally shoots Balaban numerous times. In one last struggle, Balaban and Beyazit share a sorrowful conversation, where Beyazit berates Balaban's choice to side with the empire, despite knowing his dream will only be short-lived. As Balaban dies from his wounds, Beyazit tearfully hugs his brother's body and mourns privately, stating that he loved him more than anyone else.
13	"Conclusion of the Civil War"; Transliteration: "Nairan Shūketsu" (Japanese: 内乱終結)	October 6, 2017
With Balaban's absence, Uzun leads his army to finish off Kiliç's forces, but Mahmut and his group arrive back with Balaban's severed head to show everyone that he has been defeated, prompting Uzun to withdraw. Ismail and Beyazit's gun unit follows Uzun, using the guns to cause panic and confusion among the soldiers and giving Ismail the chance to kill his father alone. After apprehending Fatma and her young son, Kemal, Mahmut and co. discuss whether to execute Fatma as protocol dictates for treason. Ayşe explains that her mother only complied with Balaban because he protects Fatma and her family from political dissenters, but votes in favor of her mother's execution. While initially agreeing to execute Fatma, Mahmut ultimately chooses to spare Fatma and fake her death. With new sultans on the thrones and the invasion of the three stratocracies' capitals halted, the Greater Turkey federation is established. Although his plans failed, Louis knows Greater Turkey is weakened and plots to invade Turkey soon. During the Divan meeting, Mahmut is offered to be reinstated as Pasha, who knows his loyalties are being tested in the wake the civil war. Although Mahmut disagrees with some of Divan's methods, he accepts being reinstated to continue protecting his homeland. Due to lacking military power at the moment, Mahmut purposes to launch a preemptive strike at the empire with economic power. With Halil's support, Mahmut is appointed to the minister of foreign affairs by the Divan. Later, Mahmut tries to return his Pyramis charm to Zağanos, who insists he keep it to help in future endeavors, and begins his next mission alongside Kyros and Abiriga.
14	"The Caravan Daughter"; Transliteration: "Taishō no Musume" (Japanese: 隊商の娘)	October 13, 2017
Traveling to the commercial city-state Argyros, Mahmut attempts to get permission from Rohmonov, one of the "Three Great Merchants" who rules the city, to conduct trade with the eastern part Rumeliana. However, Rohmonov denies Mahmut, as getting involved in politics goes against the merchant law. At the market, Mahmut and co. see Niki Al-Bahram, a young girl whose merchant father recently died and has inherited his trading license, being dismissed by her father's former workers and business partners. Mahmut and co. offer to help Niki, though he warns her of the dangers that his plans will incite and that she will be breaking the Argyros's merchant laws. Niki accepts Mahmut's offer and starts her new caravan by selling highly prized Turkey jewels, with Mahmut and his group disguise themselves as women to hide from Rohmonov. Still wanting to start eastern trade relations, Mahmut has Niki set up a meeting with Wan Yixin, a native from the eastern country of Çinili and someone with close ties to the emperor. After Mahmut convinces Wan that a business transaction that will bring peace to Çinili, Wan agrees to order an enormous shipment of Venedik glass, which made Venedik purchase all the wheat from Tharros to use as box padding. As the wheat was meant to be provisions for Balt-Rhein's invasion campaign against Turkey, Louis orders the naval fleet stationed at Phoiníkē to intercept the shipments. This results in a naval battle between Venedik and the empire, who loses the fight and are imprisoned. Mahmut is pleased that he was able to pit Venedik and Balt-Rhein against each other, earning Venedik as an ally for Turkey and stalling Balt-Rhein's invasion plans against his homeland.
15	"The Northern Kingdom"; Transliteration: "Kita no Ōkoku" (Japanese: 北の王国)	October 20, 2017
Following the naval battle, Venedik and Balt-Rhein sign a peace treaty over the wheat, and Venedik release the imperial prisoners. However, the empire's shipment of wheat was attacked by pirates and Admiral Lowe concludes that Venedik has purposely made sure the pirates run free in their territory, realizing Venedik now considers them an enemy. Meanwhile, Mahmut, Abiriga, Kyros, and Niki travel to the northern country of Urado, a strict isolationist nation that shares a border with Balt-Rhien and Greater Turkey. They meet Cabinet Minister of Turkey Negotiations, Princess Margit, and her father, King Zsigmond III. As Margit gives them a tour, Mahmut and co. learn that Urado is a poverty-stricken state and how the citizens are struggling to survive. Later, Abiriga deduces that the foul smell emanating from the coastline cliffs is fossilized bird feces, which produces high quality fertilizer. Mahmut determines that the fertilizer will help revitalize Urado. Late at night, Mahmut and co. are summoned by Zsigmond, Margit, and Princess Gertrud to the meeting hall, alongside an ambassador from Balt-Rhein. Zsigmond declares that Urado will enter a treaty with the empire, giving them passage to their territory in exchange for goods. Sensing Zsigmond's reluctance, Mahmut explains that the fertilizer from the coastlines will help revive Urado and that if they ally with Turkey, they will help Urado trade with eastern countries. After Mahmut points out that the empire's cruel treatment of nations they annexed and how they will force Urado to go to war, Zsigmond chooses to ally with Turkey and orders the Imperial envoy to be executed as a shown of trust.
16	"Beginning of the Great War"; Transliteration: "Taisen no Hajimari" (Japanese: 大戦の始まり)	October 27, 2017
At Balt-Rhein, Louis, Emperor Goldbalt IX, and their advisers prepare to take over the Centro city-states, despite the protests from Adviser Duke Eisenstein and General Corentin Pineau. At the Centro, Venedik notice that their rival nation, Republic of L'isonlani, was seen violating the secret pact between the eleven Centro nations by aiding the empire's navy ships from pirate attacks. Brega speaks with L'isonlani's Doge Doria, who falsely promises to honor the pact, but has secretly sided with the empire. When claims of a plague spread around the Centro, Brega's crew are forced to quarantine themselves for forty days. In the meantime, Doge Lucio suspects this is a ploy and L'isonlani has sided with the empire. After setting up the alliance with Urado, Mahmut and co. return to the Turkey Stratocracy and meet with Lucio, who proposes a meeting to be held between all five stratocracies of Greater Turkey, Urado, and Venedik. Once all the leaders assembles, Mahmut mediates the tension between Lucio and Zsigmond, who find Venedik untrustworthy. Once they hear that an Imperial-L'isonlani naval fleet has set up a blockade between east and west Centro, the Tripartite Military Alliance is formed to counteract the growing threat. Choosing to travel by land to confront the empire in Western Centro, Mahmut, Süleyman, and co. are assigned to convince the Cuore di Rumeliana nations to allow the Turkish army passage through their lands as Halil is appointed general of the Turkish army. At the same time, the Balt-Rhein army begins their fearsome invasion in South Rumeliana.
17	"The Flower's Plan"; Transliteration: "Hana no Ikkei" (Japanese: 花の一計)	November 3, 2017
As Mahmut and co. enter the Cuore di Rumeliana region, they quickly learn that all 34 city-states lack the military power to defend themselves against Balt-Rhein and are annoyed by their seemingly complacent attitude. After learning that they must get the Republic of Florence's permission to allow the Turkish army passage through their territory, the group heads there and sets up a meeting with Gonfaloniere Caterina di Rossi, the leader of Florence and Süleyman's former lover. While Mahmut attempts to take advantage of their thirty minutes audience, Caterina's cordial mannerisms and flirtatious conduct with Süleyman makes Mahmut too flustered to converse with her. Before leaving, Caterina informs Mahmut and co. that she is fully aware about Balt-Rhein's growing invasion and that an assembly will be held between all the leaders of Cuore republics tomorrow to decide what they will do. Caterina's secretary, Giacomo, and other Anti-Turkey nobles believe that Caterina should negotiate with Balt-Rhein rather the "barbaric" Turks and express their concerns to Caterina, who assures them she won't be allying with the Turks. Meanwhile, Balt-Rhein's invasion continues by conquering Scoglio, who has peacefully surrendered to the empire. With possession of Scolgio and Phoiníkē, General Pineau declares that Balt-Rhein is now the "heir" of the former Phoiníkē Empire and that they seek to conquer all its former territory. The Turkey spy stationed at Scoglio is able to send messenger birds out to his fellow spies before he is killed by Eleanor. Once Süleyman receives the news, Mahmut and the others interrupt the assembly. Caterina announces to them that the Cuore nations has created the Cuore Alliance as the third great continental power.
18	"Wishing on Stars"; Transliteration: "Koinegau hoshi" (Japanese: 冀う星々)	November 10, 2017
Caterina explains to Mahmut and co. that the Cuore Alliance will remain neutral and forbids the Turkish army to pass through their territories before Süleyman reveals that Balt-Rhein's victory over Scoglio and their declaration to conquer the old Phoiníkē Empire territories. However, the Cuore leaders are skeptical and has Mahmut and co. thrown in prison, but their spies soon arrive with news that confirms the Turks' words. Knowing that the Cuore Alliance are not equipped to fight the empire, Caterina releases Mahmut's group and grants them passage for the Turkish army. Enraged at Caterina's decision to side with the Tripartite Military Alliance, Giacomo and the Anti-Turkey nobles attempts to assassinate her, but are thwarted by Süleyman. Meanwhile, Mahmut, Kyros, and Abiriga travel to South Rumeliana and head to Tauro city, meeting Erbach and El Toro mercenaries on the way. The Tauro's twins mayors, Derecho and Esquerdo, challenge Mahmut to a mock battle if he wants to grant the Turkish army passage. After Mahmut wins, he hires all the Tauro city-based mercenaries to help battle Balt-Rhien, with Erbach joining the group to lead El Toro mercenaries that will follow them. As the Tripartite Military Alliance consolidates their forces, the Imperial army destroys Campana and a young boy named Vasco is the only one to escape the massacre. He meets up with Blanca, a fellow citizen and Turkey spy, and requests to be taken to the Turkey stratocracy to help with the war effort. Mahmut continues to steadily gain support from other South Rumeliana cities, but hears that Campana's destruction has caused its neighbors to surrender to the empire, leaving the Republic of Chielo that only city left for Mahmut to ally with.
19	"The Cage of Paradise"; Transliteration: "Rakuen no Ori" (Japanese: 楽園の檻)	November 17, 2017
Mahmut, Erbach, and co. arrive at Chielo and meet the state-city's leader, Carvajal, and his secretary, Cassandra. With the Balt-Rhein army pillaging provisions around the surrounding areas, thousands of refugees come to Chielo (who has a strong welfare-based system) to seek aid and shelter. Despite this taking a toll of their food supply, Carvajal allows the refugees in and agrees to join the Anti-Imperial Alliance to safeguard Chielo. In Tauro, Halil meets with Blanca and Vasco, who privately shows him a blueprint of a weapon he designed. However, Halil refuses to endorse Vasco's weapon, fearing its mass destruction. Halil burns the blueprint before moving out his troops upon hearing the Imperial army speeding up their advance to Chielo, unaware that Vasco possesses a copy of his blueprint and still plans to avenge his people. As Chielo prepares for war and the Turkish army arrives to help, they cut off Balt-Rhein's supply route, causing them to rely on the sea route for provisions. During the transition, Mahmut and Erbach lead an attack on the 12th army division, who is in charge of delivering the supplies to the main army. After stealing some of the supplies, Mahmut's group lures the 12th division and another Corps division in Chielo and burn them alive. However, General Pineau halts the rest of army after Commander Johan Frentzen realizes that Chielo has set a trap within the city, leaving Chielo's militia outnumbered. Knowing that Chielo's entire plan was risky gamble, Pineau orders a full-out blockade around Chielo to lay siege upon the city, waiting for Chielo to run out of their own food supplies.
20	"Distant Funeral Bells"; Transliteration: "Chōshō haruka nari" (Japanese: 弔鐘遥かなり)	November 24, 2017
As the siege beings, the Balt-Rhein army is short on food supplies, causing Pineau to take a large platoon of soldiers to steal from the more vulnerable Turkish army. Wanting to avoid conflict, Halil and his army choose to maintain a two-day distance from the Imperial army, since the latter is mostly made of infantry. After successfully avoiding conflict for ten days, the Imperial army manages to catch up to them after Military Supervisor, Lily Kokoschka, intercepts their marching routes on the eleventh day and orders the army to use river rafts to close the distance gap. Knowing it is pointless to run, Halil and the Turkish army engage in battle with Balt-Rhein. Having fought against Halil in a war thirteen years ago, Pineau recognizes that Halil's tactics. As two Turkish divisions circle around the Imperial army's rear, they are quickly attacked with Ballista made by the 13th division, a unit of military engineers from the peerless iron-weapon makers, Röd Orm. With the rear covered by the 13th division, Pineau's army surrounds the Turkish army and kills Halil. Marching back to their base at Chielo victorious, the Imperial army parades Halil's severed head and beheads their prisoners, much to Mahmut's and the Chielo citizens's horror. As news spread about Halil's defeat, Zağanos stops the Divan from deploying more of their forces out to South Rumeliana and convinces them to let Mahmut handle the Imperial army, but promises to avenge Halil in the future. Meanwhile, a grieving Mahmut resolves to carry on Halil's will and continues his mission.
21	"Alliance Against the Empire"; Transliteration: "Tomo mikado no Dōmei" (Japanese: 友帝の同盟)	December 1, 2017
With Halil's death and the remaining Turkish army scattered, Mahmut requests for Venedik to send supplies by sea, but they are intercepted by the L'isonlani's Boccanegra armada, who are working with Balt-Rhein. However, Venedik is able to win and breaks the blockade with the help of Doge Doria, who betrays the empire in favor gaining complete reign over L'isonlani and eliminating the rivaling Boccanegra family. Despite freeing the Centro from the empire's grasp, a large, nonseasonal storm hinders the Venedik fleet and prevents them from traveling to Chielo. After a month without any news from Venedik, Mahmut leaving to rally the Turkish forces, and many falling ill because of the storm, Chielo has reached their limit of their supplies. While Carvajal believes that Mahmut will pull through, a faction of distressed citizens rebels against Carvajal and plans to surrender the empire. With Mahmut gone, Kyros, Abiriga, and Erbach are left to prevent the dissenters from signalling any form of surrender to the empire and find where Carvajal is being locked up. Meanwhile, Mahmut and the remaining Turkish soldiers attack the Imperial army's base and steal back all their provisions. This causes Pineau to deploy most of the army to chase the Turks, who is able to avoid them for the next couple of days. Lily determines the Turks's route is drawing them near their ally's, Espada's, border and intercepts to them at Murmullo basin at high tide with their rafts. Once both armies reach the basin, Mahmut surprises the Imperial army by revealing that the other nations of Anti-Imperial Alliance and their armies has come to aid them in battle.
22	"Golden Eagle Pursuit"; Transliteration: "Inu washi no Tsuigeki" (Japanese: 犬鷲の追撃)	December 8, 2017
Despite their superior numbers, the Balt-Rhein army is boxed in by the Anti-Imperial Alliance and burns their rafts with fire arrows. Pineau orders his commanders to deal with their enemies that encircled them from the outside as the rest deals with the Turkish army that they have in an envelopment. Having chosen the battlefield beforehand, the Anti-Imperial Alliance has molded the area to their advantage and quickly overwhelms the Imperial army. After the El Toro mercenaries takes out the 13th division's ballista, Mahmut and his army escape the encirclement to take on the more vulnerable troops, decimating two imperial divisions. Seeing their disadvantage, Pineau withdraws his army and chooses to march to Espada, hoping to use it as a base for retreat. Meanwhile, Kyros and the others still search for the imprisoned Carvajal while stopping the rebels' coup d'état, and notice the Allies' signal flares confirming their victory at Murmullo basin. As the Imperial army march through the forest, morale continues to falter among them, especially as the Turkish army kills more of their men in their pursuit. Once at Espada, they discover that the republic is being guarded by the Lince mercenaries, who is being employed by the Cuore Alliance, thus invading the city means making an enemy out of them alongside the Anti-Imperial Alliance. As Mahmut's army arrives at their rear, he offers them a chance to surrender, but Lily surmises that the Lince mercenaries only has small force in Espada and their numbers is enough to take on the Turks. Hearing this, Pineau declares the army will fight and orders the Imperial army to launch a counterattack.
23	"The End of Paradise"; Transliteration: "Rakuen no Shūen" (Japanese: 楽園の終焉)	December 15, 2017
As the fighting begins, the Balt-Rhein army learns that the Lince mercenaries has a large force within Espada, contradicting Lily's initial calculation. Greatly outmatched, the Imperial army are quickly destroyed, with Mahmut personally beheading Pineau, and the rest of the high-ranking personnel are killed. As the spoils and prisoners are divided among the allies, Mahmut and the Turkish army choose to rest before returning to Chielo. Meanwhile, Blanca and Vasco continue to travel to the Turkey Stratocracy in spite of the waging battle. At Chielo, Frentzen receives news of Pineau's defeat at Murmullo basin and his march to Esapda, but realizes that the main army is beyond saving and orders a full retreat. In the republic, Kyros, Cassandra, and co. are able to locate where Carvajal is being held by the rest of the rebels, but are stopped by more dissenters, who are grief-stricken by their loved ones's deaths due to the lack of supplies and wants the siege to end. As discord erupts, the remaining rebels choose to publicly execute Carvajal, who makes a heartfelt speech before graciously accepting his death. Moments after the rebels beheads Carvajal, they receive news that the Balt-Rhein army has withdrawn. Once Mahmut arrives back at Chielo, Mahmut assets that the citizens are unable to govern their own city and declares that Chielo will be controlled by the Anti-Imperial Alliance, which Cassandra accepts.
24	"Instigation"; Transliteration: "Taidō" (Japanese: 胎動)	December 22, 2017
During a meeting between the nation leaders of the Anti-Imperial Alliance, Doge Lucio convinces the others to give Turkey control of Chielo since they are the strongest opposing force against Balt-Rhein. At the Divan, military assignments are being distributed and Mahmut is appointed as the governor of the new Chielo province. When discussing how to remodeling the city, Mimar Zeki Pasha, a student of Halil and the architect in charge of the remodeling, proposes to get rid of its poorhouses to make room for the Imaret they plan to build. However, Zağanos stresses that taking away Chielo's traditions and culture will only earn them the citizens' ire and how Turkey governs Chielo will influence how they become an "empire." While shocked by Zağanos's declaration, Mahmut openly agrees with his assessment, but privately speaks with him later, trading their philosophical stances on war and Zağanos informing of his decision to invade Balt-Rhein to Mahmut. Meanwhile, Louis slyly evades criticism by his fellow councils members for the recent failures since they have more military might than Turkey and attained half of South Rumeilana. Louis also refuses to make peace with Turkey, knowing that Zağanos, who has been gaining more influence in the Divan, will continue to wage war with them. In the next few months, the reconstruction of the Imaret continues, which Mahmut plans to named after Carvajal. Mahmut also meets with Vasco, who shows him the blueprints of his weapon - a cannon - but his idea is also rejected by Mahmut. Despite Mahmut's warnings of the potential dangers, Vasco still vows to use his cannon to avenge his people. Once all of his war preparations are completed, Zağanos leads a large army to begin his invasion of Balt-Rhein just as Mahmut continue on his adventures and resolves carrying on Halil's will.
