= Sa-Ma-La-Va =

- Regular edition cover

Single by SID

from the album Outsider
- Language: Japanese
- B-side: "Shōkyakuro"
- Released: July 24, 2013
- Length: 12:43
- Label: Ki/oon
- Composer: Aki
- Lyricist: Mao

SID singles chronology
"Koi ni Ochite" (2013)	"Sa-Ma-La-Va" (2013)	"Anniversary" (2013)

Music video
- "Sa-Ma-La-Va" on YouTube

"Sa-Ma-La-Va" (サマラバ) (Note: The official romanization by the band is "SA-MA-LA-VA", but it is sometimes romanized as "Samaraba" or erroneously as "Summer Lover".) is a single by Japanese rock band SID, released on July 24, 2013, by Ki/oon and included on the album Outsider.

== Promotion and release ==
The single was announced in mid-2013 as the eighth project commemorating the band's ten-year career. It was released on July 24, shortly before the start of their ten-year tour with some open-air concerts, and one day before Sid held an event in collaboration with the fashion brand Vanquish at the Shibuya 101 store.

“Sa-Ma-La-Va” is a summer single and was released in three editions: the regular edition and limited editions A and B. The regular edition contains only the CD with three tracks: the title track, the B-side "Shōkyakuro", and a remix of "Natsukoi", another summer single. The limited editions include a DVD featuring the live recording of Sid's concert in Singapore, which differs between the limited editions A and B. “Sa-Ma-La-Va” was included in Sid's third music video compilation, SIDNAD Vol. 10 ~Clips Three~.

== Chart performance ==
“Sa-Ma-La-Va” reached seventh place on weekly Oricon Albums Chart and remained on chart for five weeks. On Billboard Japan Hot 100, it reached 15th place. On Tower Records' Japanese pop and rock singles chart, it reached first place. It also ranked first on Usen's J-pop Request ranking, like the previous single "Koi ni Ochite".

== Reception ==
CD Journal called “Sa-Ma-La-Va” a “perfect tune for midsummer” and outdoor concerts, and praised the guitar on the second track, “Shōkyakuro.”

== Track listing ==
All lyrics are written by Mao.

No.	Title	Music	Length
1.	"Sa-Ma-La-Va" (サマラバ)	Aki	4:11
2.	"Shōkyakuro" (焼却炉)		4:14
3.	"Natsukoi" (夏恋; G/S Remix)		4:18
Total length:			12:43

== Personnel ==
- Mao – vocals
- Shinji – guitar
- Aki – bass
- Yūya – drums
