= Anniversary (Sid song) =

- Regular edition cover

Single by SID

from the album Outsider
- B-side: "Suna no Shiro"
- Released: November 6, 2013
- Genre: J-pop
- Length: 11:19
- Label: Ki/oon Records
- Songwriters: Mao, Aki, Shinji

SID singles chronology
"Sa-Ma-La-Va" (2013)	"Anniversary" (2013)	"Hug" (2014)

"Anniversary" is a single by Japanese rock band SID, released on November 6, 2013, via Ki/oon Music. The song is the opening theme of the anime Magi: The Kingdom of Magic and was included on the album Outsider. Voice actress Haruka Tomatsu, who plays the character Morgiana in the anime, covered "Anniversary" for the tribute album Sid Tribute Album -Anime Songs- (2023).

== Promotion and release ==
The song's title, "Anniversary", is in celebration of Sid's 10-year career, which started in 2003. It was the band's last project celebrating their 10 years, after other projects such as a special show at Yokohama Stadium. It is Sid's second song to be used in Magi anime series, a year after "V.I.P.".

It was released in four editions: regular, limited edition, and limited first press editions A and B. The regular edition has the CD with three tracks only: in addition to the title track, side B is "Suna no Shiro" (砂の城 ) and the third is a live recording of "V.I.P.". The limited edition adds the anime version of "Anniversary" and its instrumental version to the CD tracks. Limited editions A and B come with a DVD recorded on the band's 10th anniversary tour, with different recordings between versions A and B.

== Music video ==
The music video for "Anniversary" was produced thinking about "crossing music and anime". It was created with eight illustrators who created exclusive works for the video: Keiji Kawai, Treize, Riria09, Yusuke Saito, John Hathway, Aki Miyajima, Yosuke Adachi and Neko Shogun. Each artist took around 10 hours to film, and the overall work for each took two to three days. The music video shows footage of the drawings of the eight artists being made on a whiteboard, at the same time that the band performs on a stage with a white background, to present the finished drawings at the end.

The filming was completed at the end of October and posted on the band's YouTube channel on the 30th, along with the making-of.

== Commercial performance ==
"Anniversary" reached number six on the weekly Oricon Albums Chart and stayed on chart for eleven weeks. On Tower Records' Japanese rock and pop singles chart, it ranked fourth. It is the band's 14th best-selling single.

== Track listing ==
All lyrics are written by Mao.

No.	Title	Music	Length
1.	"Anniversary"	Aki	4:08
2.	"Suna no Shiro" (砂の城)	Shinji	3:44
3.	"V.I.P" (Live from SID 10th Anniversary LIVE)	Aki	3:26
Total length:			11:19

== Personnel ==
- Mao – vocals
- Shinji – guitar
- Aki – bass
- Yūya – drums
