= Smile (Sid song) =

- Regular edition cover

Single by SID

from the album Sentimental Macchiato
- Language: Japanese
- B-side: "Hanabira"
- Released: April 4, 2007
- Genre: Ska
- Length: 8:17
- Label: Danger Crue
- Composer: Shinji
- Lyricist: Mao

SID singles chronology
"Otegami" (2006)	"Smile" (2007)	"Natsukoi" (2007)

Music video
- "Smile" on YouTube

"Smile" is a single by Japanese band SID, released on April 4, 2007, by Danger Crue, following a winter tour and as the first single from the album Sentimental Macchiato.

== Promotion and release ==
The single was announced in early 2007. On the day of the release, SID performed at the Ryōgoku Kokugikan sumo arena. Drummer Yuya considered it one of their best shows to date. On that day, a new single was also announced for July, and that was when tickets for their performance at Nippon Budokan in December sold out.

It was released in three editions: a regular edition and limited editions A and B. The regular edition includes only the CD with two tracks, the title track and the B-side "Hanabira," while the limited editions include a DVD with a live recording of "Re:play" from the Play album tour. “Smile” was composed by guitarist Shinji. The music video was included in the band's first music video collection, SIDNAD vol.2 ~CLIPS ONE, released in May 2008.

== Composition and themes ==
CD Journal described "Smile" as starting off strong and having a fast tempo in 16 beats. JaME World wrote that the drum and bass duo "lay the upbeat foundation" for the band to play, with Mao's clear vocals on the track being reminiscent of Western ska. Speaking about the B-side "Hanabira," the portal mentioned the use of synthesizers, piano, and multiple guitar lines, being two minutes longer than the previous one.

== Reception ==
CD Journal called both tracks "refreshing", mentioning that the first is "comfortable" and highlighting the introduction of the second one, saying it resembles "the coastline." JaME World highlighted the vocals and lyrics, and ended by calling the song "an excellent choice for a spring single." Both websites called "Smile" "brilliant," while JaME added the word "catchy."

Regarding "Hanabira", JaME praises Shinji's guitar playing as well as Mao's vocals, after commenting that despite the inclusion of various instruments, the song "never feels overly busy or messy."

== Commercial performance ==
"Smile" reached number 11 on main Oricon Singles Chart, remaining on chart for six weeks. On Tower Records' Japanese rock and pop singles chart, it peaked at 7.

It sold 19,306 copies while on the charts. According to Oricon's ranking, it was the twelfth best-selling independent single in Japan in 2007.

== Track listing ==
All lyrics are written by Mao.

No.	Title	Music	Length
1.	"Smile"	Shinji	3:05
2.	"Hanabira" (ハナビラ)		5:12
Total length:			8:17

== Personnel ==
- Mao – vocals
- Shinji – guitar
- Aki – bass
- Yūya – drums
