= Hug (Sid song) =

- Regular edition cover

Single by SID

from the album Outsider
- Language: Japanese
- Released: February 12, 2014
- Length: 9:36
- Label: Ki/oon
- Composer: Aki
- Lyricist: Mao

SID singles chronology
"Anniversary" (2013)	"Hug" (2014)	"Enamel" (2014)

"Hug" is a single by Japanese rock band SID, released on February 12, 2014, by Ki/oon and included on the album Outsider. It was theme song of February on TV Asahi's television program Onegai! Ranking. "Hug" is a love song, released in celebration of Valentine's Day.

== Promotion and release ==
The single was announced in late November 2013 and that would be released in five editions, one specific to each member. The song was first performed on December 27 at the Visual BANG! ～SID 10th Anniversary FINAL PARTY event, held at Nippon Budokan, marking the closing of the band's tenth-anniversary celebrations. The event also revealed the single's content and announced the new album Outsider.

It was released as SID's first single of 2014. The five editions consisted in: a regular edition and four limited editions with special cover art and photos focused on each of the band members (A for Mao, B for Shinji, C for Aki, and D for Yūya). Additionally, the limited editions also came with a ticket to a promotional raffle and early access to tickets for the band's subsequent tour, named Outsider. The tracks do not differ between the editions, containing only "Hug" and its instrumental version.

== Commercial performance and reception ==
"Hug" reached the sixth position on weekly Oricon Singles Chart and remained on chart for five weeks. On Tower Records' Japanese pop and rock singles chart, it reached the third position. It reached number 21 on the Billboard Japan Hot 100. It is the band's 19th best-selling single, according to the Oricon ranking.

CD Journal reviewed "Hug" as "a satisfying release" and "a mature love song."

== Track listing ==
All lyrics are written by Mao; all music is composed by Aki.

No.	Title	Length
1.	"hug"	4:48
2.	"hug" (Instrumental)	4:48
Total length:		9:36

== Personnel ==
- Mao – vocals
- Shinji – guitar
- Aki – bass
- Yūya – drums
