= Nomad (Sid album) =

- Regular edition cover

Studio album by SID
- Released: September 6, 2017
- Genre: Rock
- Length: 40:48
- Language: Japanese
- Label: Ki/oon Records

SID chronology
Outsider (2014)	Nomad (2017)	Ichiban Suki na Basho (2018)

Singles from Nomad
- 1. "Glass no Hitomi" Released: January 18, 2017; 2. "Butterfly Effect" Released: May 10, 2017; 3. "Rasen no Yume" Released: August 2, 2017

Nomad is the ninth studio album by Japanese visual kei band Sid, released on September 6, 2017, via Ki/oon Records. The single "Glass no Hitomi" is the opening theme of Kuroshitsuji: Book of the Atlantic and "Rasen no Yume" is theme of Altair: A Record of Battles.

== Background and release ==
Sid went on hiatus in 2016, while vocalist Mao and bassist Aki focused on their solo careers. They returned in 2017, releasing the single "Glass no Hitomi" on January 18. The next single was "Butterfly Effect", on May 10, followed by two performances at Nippon Budokan. On August 2, the album's last single, "Rasen no Yume", was released.

Nomad was released on September 6, being the band's first album in three and a half years, following Outsider. Three editions were available: a regular edition with only the CD with 10 tracks, the limited edition A containing a DVD interview where the members talk about the album and the limited edition B coming with a 32-page photo booklet. Tower Records, Tsutaya and HMV stores provided an exclusive poster as a gift to Nomad buyers. There was also a meet and greet event in Tokyo on the 9th and Osaka on the 10th for those who purchased the album in first pressings, which accompanied a ticket to the event.

The Sid Tour 2017 Nomad started in Matsudo and continued with 15 more Japanese cities. An instrumental intro called "Prologue of Nomad" was performed during the tour and was eventually made available on streaming services on November 1. The show at the Tokyo International Forum was recorded and released as a live album, with the same name as the tour, on July 25, 2018.

== Critical reception ==
Allmusic mentioned Nomad as "a real return to form" and the band's strongest album in years. CD Journal said that the members strived to improve the sound quality in this album, having already "a pop sense and high skills for a long time".

== Commercial performance ==
Nomad reached number four on Oricon Albums Chart and remained on chart for seven weeks. On Billboard Japan Hot Albums it also reached fourth place while in Tower Records it achieved the second place.

== Track listing ==
All lyrics are written by Mao.

No.	Title	Music	Length
1.	"Nomad"	Aki	4:39
2.	"XYZ"	Aki	2:57
3.	"Glass no Hitomi" (硝子の瞳)	Yūya	4:01
4.	"Snow" (スノウ)	Aki	4:19
5.	"Shitsuke" (躾)	Aki	4:21
6.	"Butterfly Effect" (バタフライエフェクト)	Yūya	4:02
7.	"Teion" (低温)	Yūya	3:51
8.	"Kill Time"	Shinji	3:41
9.	"Rasen no Yume" (螺旋のユメ)	Aki	3:59
10.	"Fuutsu no Kiseki" (普通の奇跡)	Aki	4:54
Total length:			40:48

== Personnel ==
- Mao – vocals
- Shinji – guitar
- Aki – bass
- Yūya – drums
