= Butterfly Effect (Sid song) =

- Regular edition cover

Single by SID

from the album Nomad
- Released: May 10, 2017
- Genre: Rock
- Length: 4:05
- Label: Ki/oon Records
- Songwriters: Mao, Yūya

SID singles chronology
"Glass no Hitomi" (2017)	"Butterfly Effect" (2017)	"Rasen no Yume" (2017)

"Butterfly Effect" (バタフライエフェクト) is a single by Japanese rock band Sid, released on May 10, 2017, by Ki/oon Music.

== Promotion and release ==
On April 6, the band's new visual was revealed in promotion of the single and they announced the dates that the song would be available digitally. On May 4, the iTunes Store would begin pre-ordering the single. On the same day, the song would be made available on the Japanese streaming service Gyao! for a limited time, until May 9.

"Butterfly Effect" was released physically in three editions: limited editions A and B, and the regular edition. The limited editions included a DVD, with the one in edition A featuring the track's music video and its making-of, and the one in edition B featuring an interview video in addition to the music video. The regular edition only included the CD common to all editions containing two tracks, "Butterfly Effect" and its instrumental version. However, a special iTunes digital version was also released containing three bonus tracks: "Mousou Nikki 2", "V.I.P" and "One way", old songs of the group. Shortly after the single's release, Sid performed twice at the Nippon Budokan, on May 12 and 13.

== Music video ==
The music video for "Butterfly Effect", starring dancer Aoi Yamada, is themed around "infection." It shows a high school girl gradually becoming infected as she listens to the song while walking through the streets of Shibuya, Tokyo.

== Commercial performance ==
The single peaked at #13 on weekly Oricon Albums Chart and stayed on chart for three weeks.

== Track listing ==
All lyrics are written by Mao.

Regular edition
No.	Title	Music	Length
1.	"Butterfly Effect" (バタフライエフェクト)	Yūya	4:05
2.	"Butterfly Effect" (Instrumental)	Yūya	4:04
Total length:			8:09

Special edition
No.	Title	Music	Length
1.	"Butterfly Effect" (バタフライエフェクト)	Yūya	4:05
2.	"Mousou Nikki 2" (妄想日記2)	Shinji	3:52
3.	"V.I.P"	Aki	3:12
4.	"One way"	Aki	3:31
5.	"Butterfly Effect" (Instrumental)	Yūya	4:04
Total length:			18:45

== Personnel ==
- Mao – vocals
- Shinji – guitar
- Aki – bass
- Yūya – drums
