= Magi: The Kingdom of Magic =

- North American Complete Blu-ray Set cover
- No. of episodes: 25

Release
- Original network: MBS
- Original release: October 6, 2013 – March 30, 2014

Season chronology
- ← Previous; Magi: The Labyrinth of Magic

Magi: The Kingdom of Magic is a Japanese anime television series and a sequel to Magi: The Labyrinth of Magic, based on the manga series of the same title written and illustrated by Shinobu Ohtaka. It was broadcast in Japan on MBS from October 6, 2013, to March 30, 2014. For the first part, the opening theme song is "Anniversary" by SID and the ending theme song is "Eden" by Aqua Timez, while for the second part, the opening theme song is "Hikari" by Vivid and the ending theme song is "With You/With Me" by 9nine.

Aniplex collected its twenty-five episodes in a total of nine DVD and Blu-ray sets, which were released from January 22 to November 26, 2014.

The series is licensed in North America by Aniplex of America. They released the series in two DVD sets on March 1 and May 26, 2015. A complete Blu-ray box set was released on June 27, 2017.

== Episodes ==
No. overall	No. in season	Title	Original release date
26	1	"Premonition of a Journey"; Transliteration: "Tabidachi no Yokan" (Japanese: 旅立ちの予感)	October 6, 2013
Aladdin and his friends return to Sindria and are saluted by the people for conquering Zagan. During the festivities, Hakuryuu and Kougyoku hear that they were summoned back to the Kou Empire. It is also revealed that Dunya is resting at the palace, but refuses to talk to anyone beside Aladdin. By inspecting Dunya's dark metal vessel, Sinbad and his companions discover that it was crafted in Yamuraiha's home country, Magnostadt implying that said nation is somehow involved in Al-Thamen's plans. However, when Sinbad tries to inquire Dunya about it, the vessel fragment inside her body reacts, putting her life in danger. Aladdin manages to save her using Solomon's Wisdom but soon after, they learn that with her condition, she does not have much time left to live. Once reunited with Alibaba and Morgiana, Aladdin informs them that he will soon embark on a new journey by himself.
27	2	"Journey"; Transliteration: "Tabidachi" (Japanese: 旅立ち)	October 13, 2013
Aladdin reveals to Morgiana and Alibaba that he intends to depart alone to study magic in Magnostadt. As there are suspicions of Magnostadt's involvement with Al-Thamen, his friends attempt to dissuade him with no success. In the next day, Alibaba trains his Djinn Equip when Kougyoku appears to challenge him for a duel, but Sinbad steps in to duel with her instead and easily wins after unleashing the power of his Djinn Zepar. After the battle, Alibaba keeps company to Kougyoku as she recovers and they end up becoming friends while Sinbad agrees to join Hakuryuu against Al-Thamen when the time comes for him to challenge them. Dunya's condition worsens and she eventually dies beside Aladdin. After Dunya's funeral, both Hakuryuu and Kougyoku reveal that it is time for them to return to the Kou Empire while Aladdin still keeps his resolve to leave for Magnostadt.
28	3	"Setting Sail"; Transliteration: "Shukkō" (Japanese: 出航)	October 20, 2013
The time comes for Aladdin's departure to Magnostadt. Hakuryuu and Morgiana decide to accompany him up to the Actia Kingdom before they follow their separate paths, with Hakuryuu returning to the Kou Empire and Morgiana leaving to visit her homeland in the Dark Continent. Alibaba, who is already aboard the ship, intends to make a surprise for Aladdin and the others but he is tricked by them who already knew about it. Alibaba then reveals that he intends to train with the Yambala Gladiators at the Reim Empire to master his Djinn Equip and learn to control his magoi. Several days later, the ship is about to reach the port in Actia when it is surrounded by pirates.
29	4	"Pirates"; Transliteration: "Kaizoku" (Japanese: 海賊)	October 27, 2013
Aladdin and his friends have trouble fighting the pirates not only because of their magical tools, but due to the fact that all of them are children. When the pirates manage to capture Aladdin, they force the others to surrender and after looting the ship, they flee taking the young Magi with them. Unable to chase after their friend, Alibaba and the others disembark at Actia, where they learn that the pirates kidnapped several children from the slums and the military refuses to help them claiming that the country has mobilized its army to defend the northern frontier from a possible invasion from Magnostadt, but the commoners accuse them of turning a blind eye because the victims were not from the royalty or the nobility. Alibaba then agrees to help them without the military's help and Hakuryuu reveals that he can track down the pirates by a seed infused with his magic which he has hidden inside their loot. Meanwhile, Aladdin is introduced to the pirates leader Aum Madaura who claims that the children are better under her care than living in poverty with their families, but he refuses to believe her. As Aladdin confronts Madaura, Alibaba, Hakuryuu and Morgiana storm the pirates hideout to rescue him.
30	5	"Mother"; Transliteration: "Haha" (Japanese: 母)	November 3, 2013
Aladdin's friends storm the pirate stronghold defeating all opposition despite being astonished at all their enemies being children, including small ones. Meanwhile, Madaura uses her magic tool, the "Holy Mother Halo Fan" to entice Aladdin using his feelings for his long lost mother, doing the same with Alibaba and the others when they arrive to rescue him. It is then revealed that the unyielding loyalty of Madaura's crew to hers is because all of them are under the fan's effect and she intends to use it on the future leaders of the world's nations while they are still children in order to control their nations. However, Aladdin breaks free from Madaura's spell and helps Alibaba and Morgiana to regain their senses as well, but Hakuryuu falls under its influence instead and turns against his friends to protect her.
31	6	"A Kind Person"; Transliteration: "Yasashii Hito" (Japanese: 優しい人)	November 10, 2013
The brainwashed Hakuryuu fights his own friends until Alibaba manages to destroy his metal vessel and he collapses from exhaustion. Madaura attempts to escape but she is captured by the Actian military along the rest of the pirates. Back at the port, a commotion is started by the locals who attack the imprisoned Madaura until Hakuryuu stops them not to defend her, but to decapitate her in front of the pirates who swear revenge on him. Questioning him for his actions, Alibaba learns from Hakuryuu that his true objective is to take revenge on his own mother. She had joined forces with Al-Thamen and helped his uncle usurp the throne of the Kou Empire by orchestrating the death of Hakuryuu's father and older brothers. Realizing that the children under Madaura's spell are almost falling into depravity, Aladdin looks for a way to help them, but it is Alibaba who takes custody of the pirates and inspires them to move on with their lives as despite Madaura's death they still have each other to care for. As his friends watch the children depart to Sindria, Hakuryuu decides to leave without bidding farewell to them and when Morgiana appears looking for him, he confesses his feelings for her and asks for her hand in marriage but she refuses. Upon learning of Hakuryuu's sudden departure, Alibaba intends to reason with him fearing that he may end up suffering for killing his own parent just like Cassim did, but Aladdin decides to talk with him by himself. After properly bidding farewell to Hakuryuu, Aladdin returns to his friends' side as they also prepare themselves to follow their separate paths.
32	7	"Kouha Ren Appears"; Transliteration: "Ren Kōha Tōjō" (Japanese: 練紅覇登場)	November 17, 2013
Aladdin, Alibaba and Morgiana have one last party together before parting ways, promising to meet again as soon as possible. While Alibaba and Morgiana keep traveling by sea, but each with a different destination, Aladdin travels to Magnostadt riding his magic turban until he gets tired and boards a passing carriage instead, with instructions to not disturb the other client who is traveling with them. When the convoy is attacked by thieves, the traveler is revealed to be prince Kouha Ren of the Kou Empire, who kills all the attackers with his metal vessel and befriends Aladdin, who keeps him company during the rest of the travel to Magnostadt. Upon arriving at their destination, Kouha and Aladdin part ways and to obtain permission to enter the country, the young Magi barely succeeds in a test of his magic skills without revealing his true nature by using a special gem from Yamraiha that prevents him from drawing the Rukh around him.
33	8	"Days of Training"; Transliteration: "Tokkun no Hibi" (Japanese: 特訓の日々)	November 24, 2013
Forced to perform magic only with his own magoi, Aladdin is assigned to the lowest ranking class at the Magnostadt Academy, the "sixth kodor" where he is put under a heavy routine of physical training under his teacher Myers, who reveals that he and the other sixth kodor students will have another test in two months and will be expelled from the academy if they fail. He also meets his roommate Sphintus, who looks down on him at first for being assigned to a lower ranked class but eventually befriends him upon seeing his hard work. Myers' harsh training continues for one month, as more and more people drop out the academy until only Aladdin and other four students remain. Myers then reveals that the purpose of her training was to strengthen their bodies so they could increase the amount of magoi they can harness for their magic and the results of their hard work are shown when they discover that their magical power had greatly increased. After a month of solely magic classes, the time comes for Aladdin's exam and he passes with flying colors, reassigned directly from the sixth to the first kodor, the highest ranking class in the academy. Meanwhile, Alibaba finally reaches his destination, the Reim Empire.
34	9	"The Reim Empire"; Transliteration: "Rēmu Teikoku" (Japanese: レーム帝国)	December 1, 2013
After being duped and stripped of all his belongings during his voyage, a hungry and weakened Alibaba finally arrives at the colosseum at the Reim Empire, seeking to study under the Yambala Gladiators, but having lost his letter of recommendation from Sinbad, Toto, one of the gladiators refuses to let him see her leader after easily defeating him in combat. Alibaba is then sheltered by the Nando Brothers, who used to be members of the Fog Troupe and had made a fortune by opening a cassino in Reim. After fully recovering, Alibaba meets the leader of the gladiators, Shambal Ramal and asks for a rematch with Toto, winning after having stripped her armor without hurting her. Alibaba is then examined by Shambal and learns from him that somehow his body houses two different kinds of Magoi, interfering with his body and unless he learns to control both, not only he will never master his Djinn Equip, but will also eventually die. Shambal then accepts Alibaba as a student but to have him pay for his tutoring fees, Shambal arranges a fight for him at the colosseum against a huge, vicious beast and among the spectators is Sheherazade, the High Priestess of Reim.
35	10	"The High Priestess"; Transliteration: "Saikō Shisai" (Japanese: 最高司祭)	December 8, 2013
Forbidden to fight using his metal vessel, Alibaba finds himself in a pinch against Garda, a huge ape monster on his debut at the colosseum. Severely wounded, Alibaba attempts to forfeit but the guards do not listen to his pleas, as the audience wants a fight to the death. With his left arm broken, Alibaba reminisces about his childhood with Cassim and how they used to defeat much taller opponents with their wits and uses his surroundings at his favor to make a comeback and defeat Garda. In that moment, Shambal realizes that the two Magoi in Alibaba's body had fused into one when he recognized that the other magoi in his body belonged to Cassim. A few days later, Alibaba recovers from his wounds and it is revealed that he bought Garda's freedom, with the giant monkey now watching over him with respect. Shambal then accepts Alibaba as his disciple. Meanwhile, Morgiana finally reaches her destination in the Dark Continent.
36	11	"The Great Rift"; Transliteration: "Dai Kyōkoku" (Japanese: 大峡谷)	December 15, 2013
Disappointed upon learning that the Katarg region where she was born is not inhabited by the Fanalis anymore, Morgiana is about to be attacked by slave traders when Alibaba's brothers, Abhmad and Sabhmad appear to intervene. As they take Morgiana to see a leader of the local Toran village, Sabhmad reveals that after being removed from power in Balbadd, Sinbad recruited the brothers to work as archeologists and investigate the mysteries of the elusive Toran culture. After learning that the Fanalis have resettled by the other side of a gigantic canyon known as "The Great Rift", Morgiana decides to cross it in order to finally reunite with her people, despite being warned that no one ever returned. After reaching the bottom of the rift, Morgiana comes across a house and is received by the Magi Yunan, who reaffirms that once she reaches the other side, she will not be able to return even with his powers. Meanwhile at Magnostadt, Kouha is informed that his father, the emperor has died, and was summoned back home, but before leaving, he warns the government of Magnostadt to surrender or they will be invaded by Kou and has a brief meeting with Aladdin. Back at the Kou Empire, Hakuei reunites with her brother Hakuryuu, but she seems displeased with him for some reason, when their brother and governor general Kouen Ren appears before them.
37	12	"A New Emperor"; Transliteration: "Aratanaru Kōtei" (Japanese: 新たなる皇帝)	December 22, 2013
The heirs of the Kou Empire's throne gather to mourn their deceased father and decide his successor. In the occasion, Hakuei reminisces how ruthless her brother Hakuryuu has become after obtaining Zagan and becoming a general like her, although his army is solely composed of monsters he subdued. There is little doubt that their older brother Kouen will be chosen as the new emperor. However, their mother and empress Gyokuen Ren is appointed as the next ruler instead by a will allegedly left by her late husband, and a divide is created among the royal court, although Gyokuen claims that she will eventually relinquish the throne to Kouen once their ambition to conquer the whole world has been fulfilled. After the meeting, Hakuryuu attempts to convince Hakuei to join him against their mother with no success and decides to confront her by himself in order to avenge his father and brothers who were betrayed by her. However, even with his new power Hakuryuu is defeated by her and Judar offers himself to assist with his revenge, should he "curse his fate".
38	13	"Titus Alexius"; Transliteration: "Titosu Arekiusu" (Japanese: ティトス・アレキウス)	January 5, 2014
One year after parting with his friends, Aladdin progresses with his studies and passes the final exam of the First Kodor with flying colors by creating a huge mirage with his powers.Aladdin's friends are sure that he will be awarded as the best student of the First Kodor, but they get astonished when another student, Titus Alexius from the Reim Empire, was chosen instead. While moving to his new room, Aladdin is approached by Titus who wants to befriend him as he recognizes him as a brilliant student as well, but when Aladdin gropes him to make sure that he is not a girl, Titus gets angry at him until Matal Mogamett, the Academy's chancellor appears before them. In the occasion, it is announced that Aladdin and Titus will have a fight to test their abilities and decide if they are worthy of having advanced classes. The battle between them is fierce until both mutually expose the jewels incrusted in their arms by accident, and Mogamett declares that both will be recommended by himself. However, when Aladdin tells Titus that he wishes to talk to him about the jewels, he is suddenly attacked by Titus and despite Mogamett's intervention, Aladdin is knocked unconscious and Titus is put into solitary confinement. While Aladdin is yet to recover, Titus make contact with Sheherazade who instructs him to "keep with his mission", which according to her, is the only reason why he was born.
39	14	"The Hidden Citizens"; Transliteration: "Kakusareta Tami" (Japanese: 隠された民)	January 12, 2014
Recovering from his wounds, Aladdin finds Titus in his room, who questions him about his intentions. In the occasion, Titus reveals that he is a magician sent by Sheherazade to spy on Magnostadt, Aladdin reveals his identity as a Magi and they become friends. In the next day, Aladdin, Titus and Sphintus explore the other districts of the city but are informed that the 5th Authorization District is off limits to them until they receive the proper education. Curious about it, the trio infiltrates the 1st district and while investigating some documents, learns that the 5th district is the lair of those without an occupation, comprising two thirds of the entire city's population. While exploring the 5th district, Aladdin and the others find that its residents are being slowly drained of their Magoi when a small child collapses near them. While providing assistance to the child, who introduces herself as Marga, they learn that the citizens of the 5th district have their Magoi drained to provide energy for the magical tools used by citizens of higher levels, and Marga's heart condition is being worsened by it. Soon after, some magicians arrive to check on the citizens and when they find that Marga's Magoi is almost depleted, they throw her into a large pit to discard her, but as she falls, Aladdin and Titus jump down to rescue her.
40	15	"The Magicians' Country"; Transliteration: "Madōshi no Kuni" (Japanese: 魔導士の国)	January 19, 2014
Aladdin and Titus rescue Marga and confront the other magicians to protect the civilians until Myers appears to stop them. Brought before Mogamett, Aladdin is forgiven by the chancellor who reveals that he knows his teacher is Yamraiha and that he took care over her for some time after she lost her parents. In the next day, it is announced that the students are now authorized to visit the 5th district after Titus expressed his desire to keep watching over Marga's health, but before that, Mogamett appears to give them a lesson about the reasons for the current status quo of Magnostadt. Using clarivoyance magic, Mogamett reveals his memories of the past, when Magnostadt was still the Musta'sim Kingdom, 70 years ago when he and other magicians were forced by the royalty to use their magic to exhaustion in order to improve the land, which led to the death of his wife. After years of effort to perfect their magic, Mogamett and his fellow magicians earned themselves a place in the royal court, which drew the envy of the other nobles. However, when an unknown disease appeared in the country, the magicians were blamed and pursued for it until they were drafted as soldiers against an invasion from the Partevia Empire. The invaders were repelled, but several magicians were killed during the battle including Mogamett's only daughter and when realizing how the royals and nobles had no consideration at all for all their efforts and sacrifices, Mogamett decided to rebel against them.
41	16	"Remaining Life"; Transliteration: "Nokosareta Inochi" (Japanese: 残された命)	January 26, 2014
Mogamett then reveals that after using their magic to gain the favor of most of the population, the magicians led by him incited a revolt that led to the downfall of the Musta'sim royalty and the establishment of Magnostadt. Impressed with Mogamett's speech, the students start opening up to his views except for Aladdin and Titus. Some time later, Mogamett asks Titus to take him to Marga in the 5th district where he allows the girl to live with him at the surface. Aladdin accompanies them as well and realizes that Mogamett does not view the non-magicians as humans anymore and fears that it will eventually lead everyone to ruin. Marga is then examined and Mogamett reveals that while she can't be cured of her condition, her life can be saved, much to Titus' relief. Meanwhile, Aladdin has classes with High Magician Irene Smirnoff, who displays her experiments with Black Rukh and confirms his suspicions that Magnostadt is somehow connected to Al-Thamen. Back at his home, Titus is informed by Sheherazade that his mission is accomplished and is ordered to return home, but he turns to Mogamett for help instead, as just like Marga, he does not have much time left to live.
42	17	"Declaration of War"; Transliteration: "Sensen Fukoku" (Japanese: 宣戦布告)	January 26, 2014
Titus reveals that he is a clone of Sheherazade's created using a part of her body and infused with her Rukh to act as her proxy, and he only has a month until his body expires. Mogamett tries to calm him down when Sheherazade herself contacts the chancellor by possessing Titus' body and demands him to return the boy to her. In the occasion, she gives an ultimatum to Mogamett, claiming that eventually the only paths for Magnostadt are to be annexed by either Reim or the Kou Empire and urges him to surrender. Mogamett then breaks Titus and Sheherazade's connection to relieve him from her influence. After explaining the situation to Aladdin, Mogamett is inquired by him about his connection with Al-Thamen and reveals that he and his companions once allied with Ithnan and together, they developed the Dark Metal Vessels but severed ties with them after learning that they entrusted the vessels to non-magicians including Dunya. In the next day, the magicians decide to wage war against the Reim Empire to ensure their independence and while news of the war reach Sinbad and Kouha, Mu Alexius, one of Reim's three dungeon capturers and leader of the "Fanalis Corps" is entrusted with the task of conquer Magnostadt and bring Titus back. Mu and his forces then depart to Magnostadt, and Alibaba is seen aboard one of their ships, hoping to meet Aladdin there.
43	18	"Reim's Threat"; Transliteration: "Rēmu no Kyōi" (Japanese: レームの脅威)	February 2, 2014
The forces of Reim led by Mu arrive at Magnostadt and after Mogamett and his forces refuse to surrender, the Empire's soldiers charge forward. However, they are easily repelled by one of the three magical barriers surrounding the city and the magicians' counterattack. Meanwhile, Aladdin roams through the city looking for something that he claims it will bring death to everyone at the city if left unchecked. Back at the battlefield, the Reim forces break through the first barrier using explosives and press forward until the magicians deploy a powerful long range weapon that wipes out hundreds of enemy soldiers at once until Mu and the Fanalis Corps join the battle to protect them by blocking the weapon's shots with massive rocks and confront the Magnostadt forces directly. Perceiving that the magicians' weapon is draining the Magoi of the citizens of the 5th district to the death, Aladdin destroys the cables that power it before flying to the frontlines where Mu defeats Titus and urges him to accompany back home until the young Magi arrives and asks for their cooperation to end the war for everyone's sake.
44	19	"A Real Magi"; Transliteration: "Honmono no Magi" (Japanese: 本物のマギ)	February 9, 2014
Aladdin attempts to dissuade Mu with no success and then unlocks his Magi powers to assist the magicians against the Fanalis Corps. With most of his companions defeated, Mu decides to press forward using the powers of his Djinn Barbatos, accompanied only by his sister Myron and his subordinate Lo'lo', fighting with their household vessels. The three Fanalis then approach the second barrier but before they could take it down, Aladdin summons three sand giants to protect it. Having fully recovered his powers, the Magi fires a huge column of fire to dissuade the invaders and Alibaba, stationed at a ship, wonders if it was his friend's doing. Aladdin reaffirms his will to end the war without further casualties, and when Mu dares him to stop his forces without killing them, he dispels the giants into a huge sandslide that drags the Reim forces all the way back to the coast, giving time for Mogamett to restore the barriers. Aladdin then declares that should the invaders attempt to press forward again, he will just push them back as many times as needed, breaking the soldiers will to fight.
45	20	"Reunion"; Transliteration: "Saikai" (Japanese: 再会)	February 23, 2014
Following Aladdin's declaration, Mu equips his Djinn and attempts to kill him and take over Magnostadt in one fell swoop, but Alibaba appears to stop the general, using Amon's power to dispel his Extreme Magic. Soon after, Sheherazade approaches them and asks for a meeting in private with Aladdin, Alibaba and Titus at a neutral location. During the meeting, Aladdin asks for Sheherazade to end the war, claiming that destruction will befall the world should Mogamett be pushed to the limit, as the chancellor has possibly assembled a large quantity of Black Rukh and this could be used to repeat the same tragedy that befell Alma Toran, mankind's original world. Aladdin also reveals that this is Al-Thamen's ultimate objective and it must be prevented at all costs. After agreeing with a cease fire, Sheherazade reveals that her young body is a clone of her original, aging body just like Titus and allows him to spend the rest of his days with his friends, as her original body is almost perishing, and when that happens, all her clones will die as well. However, news of another invasion, this time from the Kou Empire reach them, and when Mogamett learns about it, he claims that from then on he will deal with all the invaders personally.
46	21	"The King Vessel"; Transliteration: "Ō no Utsuwa" (Japanese: 王の器)	March 2, 2014
Deep into the undergrounds of the 5th district, Mogamett takes control of a large mass of Black Rukh stored there after falling into depravity to deal with the invading forces, just as the Kou army, led by Kouha charges forward. Kouha's forces are repelled by three huge Dark Djinns summoned by Mogamett. Despite fully equipping his Djinn Leraje, Kouha fights to the exhaustion because the monsters keep regenerating and urges his forces to retreat, but the soldiers refuse to comply out of their loyalty to him. It is then revealed that Leraje had chosen Kouha as its master because the members of his household come from outcasts and disgraced clans who were accepted by him with no prejudice at all, leading to their unyielding devotion to him. However, just as Kouha is about to be defeated, Alibaba, fully equipping Amon, appears to drive the Dark Djins away. When attacked by a bigger number of Dark Djinns, Alibaba decides to bring out his extreme magic to destroy them for good, but just before he could do it, the monsters are vanquished by the forces of Kouen, who appears to help his brother.
47	22	"The Things I Want to Protect"; Transliteration: "Mamoritai Mono" (Japanese: 守りたいもの)	March 9, 2014
The Dark Djinns are temporarily repelled by Kouen's household, but another group of them start attacking the Reim fleet and Sheherazade along Mu and the Fanalis Corps make a stand for the rest of their forces to retreat. Meanwhile, Back in Magnostadt, Titus is sheltered inside his house, clinging to Marga, in despair not only because he has so little time left but is unsure about what he should do for the sake of all the people he befriended. Marga then encourages him to follow his beliefs to the end no matter the cost and the duo leave to meet Mogamett at the Magoi Furnace. Certain that the chancellor does not truly hate the non-magicians as he claims, Titus use the last of the Magoi inside his body to pull Mogamett out of the furnace, dying in the process. However, the Furnace does not stop working and keeps draining Mogamett's Magoi until killing him, becoming a huge mass of energy that opens a portal in the sky and a large, ominous creature start appearing through it. Empress Gyokuen and the members of Al Thamen rejoice with the fact, claiming that the entity in question is their god and it was their intent to summon it all this time. Aladdin recognizes the being as well, and reveals that it must be stopped no matter the cost.
48	23	"The Djinn Warriors"; Transliteration: "Masō Senshi-tachi" (Japanese: 魔装戦士たち)	March 16, 2014
Aladdin asks for Kouen's help and to convince him, summons his, Alibaba and Kouha's Djinns altogether. The Djinns then confirm Aladdin's claim that should the corrupt god Il Irah not be stopped, it will drain all of the world's White Rukh and all life on it will be extinguished. However, Kouen is more interested in which other secrets Aladdin could be hiding from him and agrees to help with the condition of the young Magi answering all his questions afterwards. As Kouen calls for his other brothers and sisters, the huge medium keeps conjuring Dark Djinns that attack the population of Magnostadt, and little Sheherazade and the magicians can do to stop them. Aladdin and Alibaba, assisted by the Kou Empire's King Vessels appear to fight the monsters, but the medium is protected by a strong barrier and Aladdin and the others would surely be exhausted before breaking it. Kouen then equips the Djinn Agares that he uses to bring forth a volcano and uses its heat to empower his Djinn Astaroth, allowing him to keep attacking without rest, but only its power is not enough, and he drags Alibaba to help him. As Amon is also a fire Djinn, both use the lava to empower their vessels and by combining his Extreme Magic with Kouen's, Alibaba strikes at the medium's barrier.
49	24	"Time of Destruction"; Transliteration: "Metsubō no Toki" (Japanese: 滅亡の時)	March 23, 2014
Even with the combined effort of Alibaba and Kouen, the medium's barrier was not destroyed and it closes the volcano to prevent them from replenishing their magoi. Soon after, the medium assumes a grotesque, humanoid-like form that drains the White Rukh from everything it touches. When the medium seriously hurts Kouen and Alibaba, Kouen's brothers combine their efforts to deal a sequence of powerful attacks at it, ultimately dropping it into the ocean, which backfires when it empowers itself by draining the Rukh from the sea. Back at the Kou palace, Gyokuen watches in awe the whole battle, reminiscing the time when she was one of Solomon's Magi at Alma Torran before betraying him. Exhausted by the continued battle, Aladdin and the others little can do to stop the medium as it starts pulling Il Irah from the heavens, when Sinbad appears to assist them, accompanied by Drakon, Yamraiha and the other King Vessels from the Alliance of the Seven Seas. Surprised with their sudden appearance, Aladdin is informed by Sinbad that they were previously warned of the situation by Yunan and Morgiana, who also appear to join the battle against the medium as well.
50	25	"Welcome Home"; Transliteration: "Okaerinasai" (Japanese: おかえりなさい)	March 30, 2014
As the magicians rescue the wounded in Magnostadt, Mu and the other Vessels from Reim also join the battle. In a last effort to destroy the medium, Sheherazade sacrifices herself to reinvigorate the weary King Vessels with the last of her magoi and all dungeon capturers join forces to attack it with all their might at once. However, the medium survives the blow, but Aladdin glimpses a small light inside the giant making it hesitate. Certain that it must somehow related to Titus and Mogamett, the Magi uses the Solomon's Wisdom to reach them, accompanied by Yamraiha who also wants to reunite with her foster father. The two find Mogamett being conforted by Titus' Rukh and the chancellor reveals his regret for all the troubles he caused and all the people that he forced to fall into depravity in order to create the medium. In the occasion, it is revealed that Yamraiha was kidnapped from the Royal Palace in Musta'sim when she was a child and raised by him, but she claims that she does not regret it at all and he will always be a father to her. Mogamett then decides to depart to the Great Flow of Rukh, after asking Aladdin to look for a way to redeem those who had fallen into depravity and return them to the White Rukh as well. As the medium collapses, Gyokuen rejoices as despite failing to bring forth Il Irah this time, the medium had weakened the boundaries between worlds, and another medium may bring its advent immediately once completed. Meanwhile at the great palace, Ugo greets Sheherazade and offers her a chance to reincarnate as a Magi but she allows Titus to do so in her place. The Kou Empire then turns their attention to the conquest of Magnostadt, but Sinbad declares that Sindria and its allies had joined forces with the Reim Empire and he will take custody of the country for the sake of its reconstruction. Kouen then decides to take Aladdin with him and have him fulfill his part of their deal, but their discussion is interrupted when Titus, now reincarnated as the new Magi of Reim appears before them, much to his friends' rejoice. Elsewhere, Judar and Hakuryuu, who were watching the entire battle from afar, gather all the Black Rukh dispersed from the medium and before leaving with him, Hakuryuu bids farewell to Aladdin and the others, claiming that to follow the path he chose, he must turn his back to them.
