= Otegami =

- Regular edition cover

Single by Sid

from the album Play
- Language: Japanese
- B-side: "Life"
- Released: September 16, 2006
- Length: 7:49
- Label: Danger Crue
- Composer: Aki
- Lyricist: Mao

Sid singles chronology
"Chapter 1" (2006)	"Otegami" (2006)	"Smile" (2007)

Music video
- "Otegami" on YouTube

"Otegami" (御手紙) is a single by Japanese rock band SID, released on August 16, 2006. It was theme song for TBS's television program Rank Oukoku, and featured on the album Play.

== Release ==
It was released in three editions: the regular edition with only the three-track CD, and the limited editions A and B, which include a DVD that differs between the two. The music video was included in the band's first music video collection, SIDNAD vol.2 ~CLIPS ONE, released in May 2008. In November 2023, in celebration of their 20-year career, Sid released the sheet music for “Otegami” for all instruments.

== Musical style and reception ==
CD Journal magazine praised Aki's bass lines and composition and described the song as a “ballad that incorporates a Japanese atmosphere in terms of sound and lyrics.” JaME World portal reviewed “Otegami” as a song that stands out in what it sets out to do, being "natural" and the "perfect blend of musicality and atmosphere." It also mentioned that the instruments are very well placed, including the addition of the harp. However, the portal was not as positive about the B-side "Life", mentioning that it is a pop song that, because it contrasts too much with its predecessor, alters the overall experience.

In a poll conducted by Recochoku among its users to choose Sid's most popular song, "Otegami" came in second place, after "Uso".

== Commercial performance ==
The single reached ninth place on weekly Oricon Albums Chart and remained on chart for eight weeks, selling 27,468 copies while on chart.

According to Oricon rankings, it was the ninth best-selling indie single in Japan in 2006 and is the band's 17th best-selling single.

== Track listing ==
All lyrics are written by Mao; all music is composed by Aki.

No.	Title	Length
1.	"Otegami" (御手紙)	3:49
2.	"life"	3:59
Total length:		7:49

== Personnel ==
- Mao – vocals
- Shinji – guitar
- Aki – bass
- Yūya – drums
