= Sentimental Macchiato =

- Regular edition cover

Studio album by SID
- Released: February 20, 2008
- Genre: Pop rock; punk rock
- Length: 42:30
- Language: Japanese
- Label: Danger Crue Records

SID chronology
Play (2006)	Sentimental Macchiato (2008)	Hikari (2009)

Singles from Sentimental Macchiato
- 1. "Smile" Released: April 4, 2007; 2. "Natsukoi" Released: July 11, 2007; 3. "Mitsuyubi" Released: September 26, 2007; 4. "Namida no Ondo" Released: December 6, 2007

Sentimental Macchiato (センチメンタルマキアート) is the fourth studio album by Japanese rock band SID, released on February 20, 2008, by Danger Crue Records.

The album's singles are "Smile", "Natsukoi (夏恋)", "Mitsuyubi (蜜指 ~ミツユビ~)" and "Namida no Ondo (涙の温度)", all released in 2007. The last three were used as theme song for Japanese television shows, namely Special Quiz Project Sukuizu!, Megami no Hatena and 2-Ji tchao!, respectively.

== Composition ==
As noted by CD Journal and Allmusic, the album's songs are diverse in musical genres. CD Journal summarized that Sentimental Macchiato is "basically pop rock music with sweet vocals", with the exception of the tracks "Migite no Spoon to Hatsukoi to Knife" and "Smile" which approach punk rock varieties and "Mitsuyubi", which the website claimed to have a "random rhythm". Alexey Eremenko of Allmusic noted that in "Yuuwaku Collection" folk influences mix with hard rock guitar, while "the best songs on the album" have flamenco elements. In general, Eremenko stated that the songs are confusing, citing "a little disco", "blastbeat-madness that is within a hair's breadth of hardcore or black metal" and "jazz rock".

== Critical reception ==
CD Journal defined that the tracks are rich in variety, but Allmusic considered this variety "an annoyance", noting that despite the band's transition, "tolerating some eclectic playing is a reasonable price for a set of strong songs."

== Commercial performance ==
Sentimental Macchiato peaked at number eight on Oricon Albums Chart and stayed on the chart for 8 weeks, selling 37,665 copies while on the chart. According to Oricon, it was the eighth best-selling independent album of 2008 in Japan.

The singles "Smile", "Natsukoi", "Mitsuyubi" and "Namida no Ondo" reached 11th, 10th, 5th and 4th position on Oricon Singles Chart, respectively.

== Track listing ==
All lyrics are written by Mao.

No.	Title	Music	Length
1.	"Shougen" (証言)	Aki	3:41
2.	"Natsukoi" (夏恋)	Shinji	4:27
3.	"Migite no Spoon to Hatsukoi to Knife" (右手のスプーンと初恋とナイフ)	Shinji	2:27
4.	"Mitsuyubi ~Mitsuyubi~" (蜜指 ~ミツユビ~)	Shinji	3:20
5.	"Yuukan Collection" (誘感コレクション)	Aki	3:24
6.	"And boyfriend"	Yūya	3:55
7.	"Orion"	Aki	4:31
8.	"Maschera" (マスカラ)	Shinji	4:34
9.	"Smile"	Shinji	3:05
10.	"Dear Tokyo"	Aki	3:46
11.	"Namida no Ondo" (涙の温度)	Aki	5:22
Total length:			42:30

== Personnel ==
- Mao – vocals
- Shinji – guitar
- Aki – bass
- Yūya – drums

== Charts ==
Chart performance for Sentimental Macchiato
Chart (2023)	Peak position
Japanese Albums (Oricon)	8
