= Namida no Ondo =

- Regular edition cover

Single by SID

from the album Sentimental Macchiato
- Language: Japanese
- B-side: "Keirei Boui"
- Released: December 5, 2007
- Genre: Ballad
- Length: 8:59
- Label: Danger Crue
- Composer: Aki
- Lyricist: Mao

SID singles chronology
"Mitsuyubi" (2007)	"Namida no Ondo" (2007)	"Monochrome no Kiss" (2008)

Music video
- "Namida no Ondo" on YouTube

"Namida no Ondo" (涙の温度) is a single by Japanese rock band SID, released on December 5, 2007, being the band's last indie single, released by Danger Crue. They signed with Ki/oon Music the following year. It was theme song of television program 2ji Chao!.

== Release and composition ==
"Namida no Ondo" was announced at the same day of the release of the previous single, "Mitsuyubi". Barks website presented the music video of the title track and a video commentary from the members a few days before the release. In the January 2008 issue of Fool's Mate magazine, the band discussed about the single. It was released in three editions, two of which were limited editions and included a bonus DVD and a special booklet.

CD Journal and Barks called the song “an affectionate ballad." It was composed by bassist Aki, and the lyrics were written by vocalist Mao.

== Commercial performance ==
"Namida no Ondo" reached number one on indies Oricon Singles Chart indies and Tower Records' Japanese rock and pop singles chart. It reached fourth place on the Oricon main chart, remaining on chart for seven weeks.

It is the band's 18th best-selling single, according to Oricon's ranking.

== Track listing ==
All lyrics are written by Mao.

No.	Title	Music	Length
1.	"Namida no Ondo" (涙の温度)	Aki	5:22
2.	"Keirei Boui" (敬礼ボウイ)		3:37
Total length:			8:59

== Personnel ==
- Mao – vocals
- Shinji – guitar
- Aki – bass
- Yūya – drums
