= Magi: The Labyrinth of Magic season 1 =

Magi: The Labyrinth of Magic
- Season 1
- North American Complete Blu-ray Set cover
- No. of episodes: 25

Release
- Original network: MBS
- Original release: October 7, 2012 – March 31, 2013

Season chronology
- Next → Magi: The Kingdom of Magic

Magi: The Labyrinth of Magic is a Japanese anime television series based on the manga series of the same title written and illustrated by Shinobu Ohtaka. Produced by A-1 Pictures, it began airing in Japan on October 7, 2012. It also debuted in North America on October 10 on Crunchyroll and Hulu. The series is licensed by Aniplex of America in North America, by Viz Media Europe in Europe and by Madman Entertainment in Australia. From episodes 1–12, the opening theme song is "V.I.P." by SID and the ending theme song is "Yubi Bōenkyō" by Nogizaka46. From episode 13 onwards, the opening song is "Matataku Hoshi no Shita de" by Porno Graffitti and the ending is "The Bravery" by Supercell.

== Episodes ==
No. overall	No. in season	Title	Original release date	English air date
1	1	"Aladdin and Alibaba"; Transliteration: "Arajin to Aribaba" (Japanese: アラジンとアリババ)	October 7, 2012	October 18, 2013
A young boy named Aladdin asks Ugo, a giant Djinn for a certain wish. In the desert country of Qishan, Alibaba, a youngster who dreams to obtain power and wealth by clearing the mysterious dungeons around the world and claiming their treasures, has his dream mocked. He later encounters Aladdin, eating the cart's food. Upon learning Aladdin's secret power, Alibaba gets close to him trying to win over his favor, but he only manages to get his help when he finally assumes that his true desire is to overcome his own hopelessness. Aladdin's wish is finally granted when Alibaba agrees to become his friend.
2	2	"Dungeon Suite"; Transliteration: "Danjon Kumikyoku" (Japanese: 迷宮組曲)	October 14, 2012	October 25, 2013
Alibaba and a slightly exhausted Aladdin enter a nearby dungeon. They manage to elude traps and confront monsters by relying on the power of Ugo at the price of Aladdin's energy. Little do they know that they are being followed by Jamil and his two slaves, Morgiana and Goltas. Jamil confronts Alibaba and demands his service in navigating the dungeon. Alibaba and Aladdin manage to lose Jamil and find themselves at the Door of Truth.
3	3	"Magician of Creation"; Transliteration: "Sōsei no Mahōtsukai" (Japanese: 創世の魔法使い)	October 21, 2012	November 1, 2013
Aladdin and Alibaba reach the dungeon's inner chamber and are attacked again by Jamil and Morgiana. When Morgiana is about to kill Alibaba, Aladdin uses his powers to stop her, which prompts another Djinn named Amon to appear. Amon declares that they have cleared the dungeon and greets Aladdin as a Magi. Jamil urges Aladdin to recognize him as a king, as his former teacher had foretold, but he declines. When the dungeon starts to collapse, caused by an unknown Magi, Goltas grabs Jamil to die with him while Amon helps Aladdin, Alibaba and Morgiana escape. Morgiana finds herself on the outskirts of the city, Aladdin on unknown plains and Alibaba, with the treasure in his possession, resurfaces where the now disappeared dungeon used to be and is greeted by the people of the city. Unaware that Amon now resides within his sword, he wonders about Aladdin's fate.
4	4	"The People of the Plains"; Transliteration: "Sōgen no Tami" (Japanese: 草原の民)	October 28, 2012	November 8, 2013
Three days after clearing the dungeon, Alibaba still has no news about Aladdin. He is visited by Morgiana who thanks him for making use of the treasure he collected to free all slaves including her. Alibaba then decides to leave the city looking for his friend. Aladdin wakes up in a nomad village far away and is welcomed by the Koga Clan's leader, the Shaman Chagan. Hakuei Ren, first princess of the Ko Empire appears at the village to ask the clan to join the Empire, but Chagan declines her offer. Fearing that the Empire may eventually annex the Koga by force, Aladdin pays a visit to the princess and she promises him to solve the matter without causing any deaths. Meanwhile, some women from the clan are kidnapped by slave traders, and a group of warriors set to rescue them, warned to not kill anybody in order to not cause a war. As Aladdin and Chagan wait for them to return, she tells him the story of how the Koga were once the biggest empire in the world after a king chosen by a magi unified his people and formed the first nation in history. After the warriors return, bringing the women with them and having fulfilled the promise to not shed any blood, Chagan announces her decision to have the clan join the Ko Empire, but soon after, an arrow is shot at her.
5	5	"Dungeon Capturer"; Transliteration: "Danjon Kōryakusha" (Japanese: 迷宮攻略者)	November 4, 2012	November 15, 2013
As Aladdin rushes to take the Shaman to be treated, Hakuei learns that one of the soldiers was killed by an arrow from the Koga Clan and leaves the army under command of her aide Ryosai to learn the truth about the attack. She comes across the clan who does not believe her words even after she had herself wounded after refusing to fight back. Chagan, who is brought there by Aladdin under her request, reaffirms her decision to have the Koga become a protectorate of the Ko Empire and allows the princess to return. After Chagan expires from the wound, her spirit appears before Aladdin, who confirms that he is indeed, a Magi. Hakuei returns to the camp just to find Ryosai and his troops ready for war. She learns that it was all a plot of his to have her killed and him take command of her troops. Hakuei and her assistant fight against the troops only to be defeated when her magic artifact runs out of Magoi, but soon after, Aladdin appears and saves them. Aladdin uses his powers to have Paimon, the Djinn inside Hakuei's artifact, materialize and learns from her that Hakuei is her "King".
6	6	"Warrior Tribe Fanalis"; Transliteration: "Sentō Minzoku Fanarisu" (Japanese: 戦闘民族ファナリス)	November 11, 2012	November 22, 2013
Morgiana has passed the previous six months traveling with a caravan, but just when she is about to reach her destiny, the city of Balbadd, where she hopes to take a boat to her homeland, she learns that the caravan will take another route because of a group of thieves on their way. Morgiana decides to confront the thieves by herself and is defeated by a slave trader who paralyzes her with the poisonous claws of his eagle. Once again in chains, she wakes up near a scared child who was separated from her parents and when the slave traders learn that the girl is feverish, they decide to feed their beasts with her. Morgiana watches in horror as the child is about to be killed when she hears Goltas' voice urging her to fight back, and she breaks up her restraints with her power, protecting the girl and defeating the slave traders. Morgiana then reaches the cell where the other captives are being held just to find Aladdin among the prisoners. As the members of Morgiana's caravan appear to help her, they find the thieves and slave traders fleeing in fear of Ugo. After reuniting with the caravan, Morgiana learns from Aladdin that he is also going to Balbadd to meet Alibaba and she continues her travel to the city, now accompanied by him.
7	7	"His Name is Sinbad"; Transliteration: "Sono Na wa Shindobaddo" (Japanese: その名はシンドバッド)	November 18, 2012	November 29, 2013
Aladdin and Morgiana come across a naked man who was robbed of all his belongings, and accompany him to the city of Balbadd. There they learn that the man is none other than Sinbad, the king of Sindria. Sinbad has come to Balbadd to convince their rulers to reopen trade with Sindria, but they claim to have their hands full dealing with a group of thieves known as the "Fog Troupe" who is now being led by no other than Alibaba. Upon figuring out the thieves' next possible targets, Sinbad and his aide Masrur take guard in one place where his other retainer Ja'far, Aladdin and Morgiana guard the other. The Fog Troupe attacks subduing all resistance and just as Aladdin and Morgiana appear to fight them, Alibaba reveals himself before an astonished Aladdin.
8	8	"A Broken Promise"; Transliteration: "Mamorenai yakusoku" (Japanese: 守れない約束)	November 25, 2012	December 6, 2013
Alibaba passes through Aladdin, claiming that he cannot keep the promise he made to him, and invokes the flames of Amon's sword to escape with the rest of the Fog Troupe. Back in his room, Alibaba is kidnapped by Morgiana who brings him before Aladdin so he can explain himself properly. Meanwhile, Sinbad discovers that Balbadd is being pressured by the Kou Empire to adopt their currency. Alibaba reveals to Aladdin and Morgiana the story of how he was raised in the slums alongside Cassim, the de facto leader of the Fog Troupe and after his mother's death, he was taken in by his father, the King of Balbadd. On his deathbed, the King recognized Alibaba's capacity and asked him to assume Balbadd's throne, but while considering his offer, Alibaba sneaked out of the castle and met Cassim who made use of the tunnels used by Alibaba to infiltrate it with his fellow bandits, much to his regret.
9	9	"A Prince's Duty"; Transliteration: "Ōji no Sekinin" (Japanese: 王子の責任)	December 2, 2012	December 13, 2013
Alibaba concludes his story, revealing that after Cassim's attack on the palace, his father died and he fled the country in regret. After his encounter with Aladdin, he decided to return to Balbadd to take responsibility for his actions, just to find that the slums where he was raised are no more. Cassim revealed to Alibaba that it was destroyed by the government after an epidemic that claimed the life of his sister and asks him to become leader of the Fog Troupe to make a stand against the current king Abhmad, whose disregard for the people has put the country in turmoil. As Sinbad, who is listening the story in the next room takes heed of Alibaba's situation, the hotel is attacked by the Fog Troupe who intends to kill Sinbad and rescue Alibaba, but the King of Sindria and his aides defeat them all. Instead of taking them into custody, Sinbad convinces Alibaba to accompany him to the palace and help bring his brother, the king Abhmad to his senses. In the following day, as Abhmad refuses to listen to Alibaba's request to give aid to his people, Aladdin and Morgiana wait outside the palace amid a huge crowd. When a strange man passes by them, Aladdin has an ominous feeling about him.
10	10	"His Name is Judar"; Transliteration: "Sono Na wa Judaru" (Japanese: その名はジュダル)	December 9, 2012	December 20, 2013
The man presents himself as Judar, an oracle serving the Ko Empire who claims to have business with Abhmad. Ignoring Alibaba's protests, Abhmad reveals to Sinbad that by recommendation of his financial advisor Markkio, he relinquished all of Balbadd's trading rights to the Ko Empire, thus he is not in position to resume trading with Sindria. Back at the Fog Troupe's base, Sinbad announces to the people of the slums that negotiations with Abhmad failed, but for some reason, Cassim and his companions are nowhere to be found. Judar appears before Sinbad and notices that the Rukh behaves strangely around Aladdin. Sinbad then reveals that it is because Aladdin is a Magi just like him. Without any warning, Judar starts attacking Aladdin until Ugo appears to stop him. Judar strikes Aladdin with his ice spears and Ugo shields him with his own body. Aladdin tries to have the wounded Ugo return to the flute, but he refuses. Judar then impales Ugo with a huge ice spear but the Djinn makes use of his last strength to crush him with his hands.
11	11	"A New Visitor"; Transliteration: "Arata naru Raihōsha" (Japanese: 新たなる来訪者)	December 16, 2012	December 27, 2013
Judar is saved from being killed by a princess of the Kou Empire and her aid Ka Koubun, who tends to his wounds. Ugo tries to attack them, but the princess defeats him with the aid of her Djinn Vinea. Aladdin then launches himself in fury against the princess who orders her servants to kill everyone. However, Sinbad intervenes and convinces the princess to retreat. As the wounded from the battle are treated, Alibaba and Morgiana find an exhausted Aladdin who had almost all of his Magoi depleted in an attempt to bring back Ugo and is in critical condition. Feeling himself useless for not being able to do anything to help and with Cassim still missing, Alibaba is visited by his other brother, the viceroy Sabhmad. Sinbad deduces that it was Sabhmad who was leaking info about the army to the Fog Troupe and he explains that it was all to protect Alibaba, whom he claims is the only one able to stop Abhmad. He reveals that after contracting a huge debt with the Kou Empire, Abhmad intends to pay for it by selling the people of Balbadd as slaves. Upon hearing that, Morgiana urges Alibaba to make a stand against him.
12	12	"Determination and Separation"; Transliteration: "Ketsui to Ketsubetsu" (Japanese: 決意と決別)	December 23, 2012	January 3, 2014
Before returning to the palace, Sabhmad warns Alibaba that in five days, Abhmad will marry one of the Kou Empire's princesses and on the occasion, his decision to turn the people of Balbadd into slaves will be announced. Some time later while Aladdin still shows no signs of waking up, Alibaba is informed by Sinbad that in order to stop Abhmad's plans and prevent the country from being taken over by the Kou Empire, he must assume the throne of Balbadd. As Alibaba wanders the streets thinking about it, he is approached by Cassim, who is in hiding among what remains of the Fog Troupe. Cassim reveals to Alibaba that he already knows about Abhmad's slavery plan and helped by the weapons dealer who supplies their magic tools, he intends to start a rebellion in two days. Alibaba refuses to cooperate with him, and affirms that he will look for a solution which does not involve the death of anyone. After Alibaba is driven away by Cassim, he turns to Sinbad and asks him to teach him how to properly use his djinn. Some time later, Morgiana tries to find Alibaba with no success and realizes that he had left to confront his brother alone. Meanwhile at the palace gates, Alibaba stands before the guards, asking them to let him in.
13	13	"Prince of Rebellion"; Transliteration: "Hangyaku no Ōji" (Japanese: 反逆の王子)	January 6, 2013	January 10, 2014
Alibaba manages to reach the palace grounds, but Abhmad sends one of the three royal guards from the Kou Empire to kill him. After finally succeeding to properly equip Amon's sword, Alibaba defeats the first guard, but the second guard and his army of monkeys block his way until Morgiana appears to fight in his place, allowing him to keep pressing forward. As Morgiana fights the second guard, Alibaba runs out of Magoi while fighting the third guard and creates some fire with oil to power up Amon's sword for an instant, using it to bring him down. Meanwhile Sinbad learns about the situation and leaves to the palace too. With all guards defeated, Alibaba reaches the throne room where Abhmad orders his guards to kill him, but Sabhmad intervenes of his favor, insisting that the conversation between his two brothers must not be disturbed.
14	14	"Alibaba's Answer"; Transliteration: "Aribaba no Kotae" (Japanese: アリババの答え)	January 13, 2013	January 17, 2014
As Alibaba tries to convince Abhmad to step down, Kogyoku Ren, the princess they previously met, appears in an attempt to stop the commotion. She claims that even if Abhmad is removed from power, another king must be chosen to marry her as part of Balbadd's agreement with the Kou Empire and all agreements between both countries, including the slavery treaty, must be acknowledged. Alibaba instead declares that there will be no king at all because Balbadd's monarchy shall be dissolved and adopt a democratic rule. Sinbad joins the discussion bringing some representatives of his confederation, the Alliance of Seven Seas with him and offers himself to discuss Balbadd's inclusion in said alliance with the Kou Emperor in person, prompting Kogyoku to retreat. As Alibaba addresses his decision to the people, the Rukh gathers strangely around Aladdin and Judar, while Cassim and his men approach the palace.
15	15	"Cassim's Answer"; Transliteration: "Kashimu no Kotae" (Japanese: カシムの答え)	January 20, 2013	January 24, 2014
Instead of accepting Alibaba's solution, Cassim ignites a rebellion claiming that despite being removed from power, the monarchy still must be executed for their crimes against the people. Meanwhile, Aladdin's spirit is brought before Ugo, now reduced to just his head, who reveals to him that Alibaba and the others are in danger by the devices of those who intend to disrupt the natural flow of Rukh and cover the world in darkness. To fight them back Ugo sends Aladdin into a portal for him to be bestowed with the "Wisdom of Solomon" while bidding farewell to him, as according to Ugo, they will never meet again. Back at the palace, Alibaba confronts and defeats Cassim and the rest of the Fog Troupe, but instead of surrendering, Cassim stabs himself with his magic sword, drawing all the troupe's other swords to his body and transforming him into a huge black monster.
16	16	"Wisdom of Solomon"; Transliteration: "Soromon no Chie" (Japanese: ソロモンの知恵)	January 27, 2013	January 31, 2014
Now transformed into a Dark Djinn, Cassim takes advantage of Alibaba's reluctance to kill him and breaks his sword. Sinbad tries to weaken Cassim until he is restrained by Judar, who joins the battle and takes control of Cassim. Fueled by all the Black Rukh created by the turmoil in Balbadd, Judar and Cassim overpower Alibaba, but just as they are about to kill him, Aladdin appears to stand in their way. Enveloped by a huge mass of untainted Rukh, Aladdin deflects Judar's attacks and asks for Alibaba's help to save Cassim.
17	17	"Smile"; Transliteration: "Egao" (Japanese: 笑顔)	February 3, 2013	February 7, 2014
Aladdin briefly restores Alibaba's sword, allowing to dive deep into the Dark Djinn and meet Cassim in spirit, learn the reasons behind his friend's hatred and convince him to give up on his revenge. Cassim's body then returns to normal, but he dies by the effects of the transformation. After the weapon dealer takes Judar away and send him to his masters, the organization "Al-Thamen", his body is destroyed by Sinbad who had his metal vessels returned to him by the thieves who stole it. Aladdin's power also allows the people of Balbadd to have a short meeting with the spirits of their late friends and loved ones, including Alibaba, who meets his father and mother, along Cassim and his deceased sister one last time. With no reason left to fight, the rebellion in Balbadd is finally suppressed.
18	18	"The Kingdom of Sindria"; Transliteration: "Shindoria Ōkoku" (Japanese: シンドリア王国)	February 10, 2013	February 14, 2014
With the help of his friends, Alibaba organizes the reconstruction and establishment of the new democratic government in Balbadd and he is bitten by a strange snake that disappears soon after. However, a huge fleet from the Kou Empire approaches Balbadd and is preparing itself to invade it. Alibaba asks to Sinbad to let him defend his country against the invaders, but to protect him, he knocks him unconscious and sends him with Aladdin and Morgiana to Sindria instead, as he departs to the Kou Empire to negotiate with the Emperor on Balbadd's behalf. Several months later, Sinbad returns to Sindria and confirms to Alibaba and Aladdin that Balbadd had lost its sovereignty to the Empire but the rights of its citizens are ensured. In the occasion, Sinbad also tells them that the turmoil in Balbadd was orchestrated by Al-Thamen and asks for their help to stop their plans to spread chaos throughout the world. When informed that a huge monster is attacking, Sinbad sends Yamuraiha and Sharrkan, two of his generals to hunt it down and introduces them to Aladdin and Alibaba, claiming that they can teach them to increase their abilities. Later in the night, a huge party is held to celebrate Sinbad's return where he introduces his other generals to Aladdin and the others and Morgiana asks for Aladdin and Alibaba to keep fighting on their side in gratitude for all they did to her, which they oblige. Meanwhile, a prince sent by the Kou Empire to study in Sindria approaches the country, accompanied by Kogyoku, who by some reason, is furious with Sinbad.
19	19	"The Culprit's Name is Sinbad"; Transliteration: "Hoshi no Na wa Shindobaddo" (Japanese: ホシの名はシンドバッド)	February 17, 2013	February 21, 2014
As Yamuraiha teaches Aladdin about the properties of Magic, Sinbad presents Alibaba with a sword he received from his late father to replace his broken knife as Amon's metal vessel. Morgiana is also asked to choose an item to be infused with Amon's power to serve as her household vessel, but she decides to have one forged from the same shackles she used during her times of slavery instead. Soon after, a fleet from the Kou Empire arrives bringing the fourth prince Hakuryuu Ren, accompanied by Kogyoku, who accuses Sinbad of defiling her body in her sleep during his visit to the Emperor. By Sinbad's request, Yamuraiha makes use of her magic to prove Sinbad's innocence and it is revealed that it was all a scheme of Koubun Ka's to have him marry the princess by force. When Sinbad and Hakuryuu meet in private, the prince expresses his desire to destroy the Kou Empire, which is now under the influence of Al-Thamen.
20	20	"The Two Princes"; Transliteration: "Ōji to Ōji" (Japanese: 王子と皇子)	February 24, 2013	February 21, 2014
Upon learning Hakuryuu's reasons, Sinbad insists that he should learn more about his country first and asks him to introduce himself to Alibaba and the others. When Alibaba meets Hakuryuu, he hears a voice from himself urging him to hate and attack him, but he collapses instead. Upon being examined, it is revealed that the snake bite Alibaba suffered in Balbadd has spread into a dark wound onto his body, from which the agent of Al Thamen, who was supposedly destroyed there, emerges. Sharrkan attacks the enemy whose dark blood splashes on Sinbad, cursing him too. Before disappearing, the agent explains that upon cursed, it is only a matter of time before both Alibaba and Sinbad fall into depravity and become overtaken by the Black Rukh. However, there is a dungeon called "Zagan" in an island to the south which is yet to be conquered, and whose Djinn can heal any kind of disease. As Sinbad and his household are forbidden from entering any further dungeon as he already has seven Djinn under his command, he sends Aladdin, Morgiana and Alibaba to conquer Zagan instead. Hakuryuu also offers himself to accompany them on their quest and together they depart there, escorted by one of Sinbad's Generals, Pisti. Upon arriving at the island, the four are approached by a child who asks them to rescue her parents, who are trapped inside Zagan. Hakuryuu and the others agree to help her and set to the dungeon, from which a strange light emanates and pulls them inside.
21	21	"Zagan Labyrinth"; Transliteration: "Meikyū Zagan" (Japanese: 迷宮ザガン)	March 3, 2013	February 28, 2014
After a brief contact with the bizarre creatures living inside the Zagan Dungeon, Aladdin, Alibaba, Morgiana and Hakuryuu are greeted by Zagan himself, who holds the child who asked them for help previously as a hostage and declares that to rescue her and the other islanders trapped there, they must succeed in passing his trials. The party clears the challenges and traps Zagan throws at them with certain ease, except for Hakuryuu, whose refusal to accept assistance causes more trouble than help, until he ends up kneeling into tears when Zagan teases him, denouncing how he is dragging down the others. Recognizing the prince as a reflection of his former self, as he believes he could save Cassim should he had asked for his friends' help sooner in Balbadd, Alibaba encourages Hakuryuu and the group resumes their quest with renewed confidence. Meanwhile, Judar appears hovering in mid air over Sindria.
22	22	"Household of Flames"; Transliteration: "Honō no Kenzoku" (Japanese: 炎の眷属)	March 10, 2013	February 28, 2014
Judar breaks past Sindria's defenses and confronts Sinbad about his intentions of bringing Aladdin to his side. Judar also questions him about why despite there always had three Magi alive on each era and with the other two known to be still alive, a fourth Magi enlightened by the Wisdom of Solomon, Aladdin, has appeared. He also warns Sinbad that sending Aladdin and the others to Zagan by themselves was a mistake. Sinbad then realizes that there are members of Al-Thamen who infiltrated Zagan after them. Meanwhile, back in the Dungeon, Aladdin realizes that the creature that appears before them claiming to be Zagan is not him, but one of his creations. The monster confirms his suspicions and reveals that the real Zagan is sleeping deep inside the Dungeon Room and the party falls on a trap door that leads to its real body which intends to devour them. Desperate to save her companions, Morgiana succeeds to activate her Household Vessel and uses to rescue the others and destroy the monster, but she collapses soon after, as the effort drained almost all of her Magoi. Alibaba carries Morgiana to the Dungeon Room with the others to have Zagan heal her, but a trio of enemies sent by Al-Thamen appear in their way, with the intent to kill them.
23	23	"Battle Cry"; Transliteration: "Toki no Koe" (Japanese: 鬨の声)	March 17, 2013	March 7, 2014
Hakuryuu takes the villager girl and Morgiana to the treasure room for their own safety, leaving Aladdin and Alibaba to confront the three enemies, Ithnan, Dunya and her knight Isaac by themselves. Just like Cassim did once, Dunya impales herself with a Dark Metal Vessel and becomes a Dark Djinn to fight Aladdin, while Isaac crosses swords with Alibaba. The young Magi and his friend find themselves on a disadvantage at first, until they change their strategy and gain the upper hand. However, Ithnan has Dunya assume further control of her power, fully equipping her Dark Djinn, while Isaac somehow recovers from his wounds. Meanwhile in Sindria, Judar flees after declaring that with the barrier protecting the country now destroyed, an invading force from Al-Thamen is en route there to destroy it. As Hakuryuu returns to assist his friends against the enemy, Sinbad and his forces prepare to defend their country from the impending attack by Al-Thamen.
24	24	"Fall into Depravity"; Transliteration: "Daten" (Japanese: 堕転)	March 24, 2013	March 7, 2014
The forces of Sindria resist the attack from Al-Thamen's forces, but while Sharrkan and Masrur manage to defeat two of the enemy's main commanders, an ominous huge mass approaches the island, devouring all it touches. Meanwhile at the dungeon, the empowered Dunya prepares a massive attack to wipe out Aladdin and the others while Isaac protects her. Just when Alibaba is about to be killed by Isaac, Hakuryuu stands between them to protect him and has his left hand cut off. Once completing her Extreme Magic, Dunya seemingly obliterates the trio with a rain of countless swords, just to find that she was aiming at a mirage created by Aladdin's magic, far away from their real position. Once exhausted Dunya returns to normal and Isaac starts breaking apart, revealed to be just an inorganic servant of hers. Alibaba tries to reason with Dunya, but she is mortally wounded by Ithnan, claiming that her services are no longer required. Alibaba is then surrounded by a mass of Black Rukn that shows him that she was a princess from the Musta'sim country, which was overthrown by the magicians of Magnostadt, and that Isaac was modeled after Dunya's servant who sacrificed himself to protect her. With the corruption spreading throughout his body, an enraged Alibaba stabs Ithnan with his sword. Ithnan then finally perishes, but not without accomplishing his objective: to have Alibaba fall into depravity and transform himself into a Dark Djinn.
25	25	"Alibaba and Aladdin"; Transliteration: "Aribaba to Arajin" (Japanese: アリババとアラジン)	March 31, 2013	March 14, 2014
Aladdin tries to reason with Alibaba with no success due to Ithnan's control. Morgiana and Hakuryuu join the fight and in the occasion, the real Zagan chooses Hakuryuu as his master, using his powers to create a replacement for his lost arm and they manage to give an opening for Aladdin to successfully reach his mind with the Wisdom of Solomon. With Kogyoku's help, Sinbad's forces manage to defeat the remaining threats and protect Sindria. As Ithnan flees away, Sinbad appears before him and fully equips his Djinn Focalor, but much to the enemy's surprise, his corrupted body recovers. Ithnan then realizes that by some reason, despite half of Sinbad's body having already fallen into depravity, he has full control over both his normal and black rukh, using them to deal a finishing blow to him. Inside Alibaba's conscience, Aladdin learns that a part of Cassim's magoi still lives inside Alibaba and with his help, he manages to erase the corruption in his body as well. Now with his main body destroyed, what remains of Ithnan inside Alibaba's mind is confronted by Aladdin, who wants to know the reason why Al Thamen intends to bring turmoil to the world and recognizing him as an envoy of King Solomon, he shows him visions of Solomon's kingdom Alma Toran, including the moment of its destruction. Claiming that it is impossible to dissuade him, Ithnan asks Alibaba to strike him down for good, but he refrains from doing so, allowing Aladdin to have him return peacefully to the guidance of Rukh. As Aladdin and Alibaba leave the dungeon with his friends, having saved the villagers and claimed its treasures, the young Magi renews his vow to help his friend to become a King that shall properly guide the world, certain that their adventures together are just beginning.
