= Chapter 1 (song) =

- Regular edition cover

Single by SID

from the album Play
- Language: Japanese
- B-side: "Aoi Renga"
- Released: June 14, 2006
- Length: 9:14
- Label: Danger Crue
- Songwriter: Aki
- Lyricist: Mao

SID singles chronology
"Hosoi Koe" (2006)	"Chapter 1" (2006)	"Otegami" (2007)

Music video
- "Chapter 1" on YouTube

"Chapter 1" is a single by Japanese band SID, released on June 14, 2006, by Danger Crue and included on the album Play. It was ending theme song of television program CDTV.

== Promotion and release ==
The single was announced in early 2006. It was released on June 14 in three editions: the regular edition and two limited editions. The regular edition contains only the two-track CD, with the title track and its B-side "Aoi Renga", and the limited editions A and B contain a live recording, which differs between the two, from the April Spring Special concert.

"Chapter 1" was composed by bassist Aki, with lyrics written by Mao. The music video was included in the band's first music video collection, SIDNAD vol.2 ~CLIPS ONE, released in May 2008.

CD Journal portal described Mao's vocal style as “sexy and addictive.”

== Commercial performance ==
It reached tenth place on Oricon Singles Chart, remaining on chart for five weeks. It was the band's first single to reach the top 10 on the chart, highlighting their rapid rise.

It sold 21,483 copies while it was on the charts. It was the tenth best-selling indie single in Japan in 2006, according to Oricon.

== Track listing ==
All lyrics are written by Mao.

No.	Title	Music	Length
1.	"Chapter 1"	Aki	4:39
2.	"Aoi Renga" (青いレンガ)		4:35
Total length:			9:14

Limited edition DVD

3. "2006.Spring Special"

== Personnel ==
- Mao – vocals
- Shinji – guitar
- Aki – bass
- Yūya – drums
