= Natsukoi =

- Regular edition cover

Single by SID

from the album Sentimental Macchiato
- Language: Japanese
- B-side: "Propose"
- Released: July 11, 2007
- Length: 7:20
- Label: Danger Crue
- Lyricist: Mao

SID singles chronology
"Smile" (2007)	"Natsukoi" (2007)	"Mitsuyubi" (2007)

Music video
- "Natsukoi" on YouTube

"Natsukoi" (夏恋) is a single by Japanese rock band SID, released on July 11, 2007, by Danger Crue Records. The song was ending theme for the television program Special Quiz Project Shizuku.

== Composition and release ==
The single was released in three editions, one regular and two limited editions. The limited editions, named A and B, included an extra DVD of a recording of “Re-play” from the Play album tour; this recording differs between the two versions. The regular edition comes with a special 12-page booklet.

CD Journal commented that the single is generally highly polished and represents an improvement on the previous one, "Smile". Jame World portal called the song "catchy and fun." Squize website also used the term “sticky” to refer to the lyrics, but mentioned it as a "refreshing summer song."

== Commercial performance ==
"Natsukoi" reached tenth place on Oricon Singles Chart, remaining on the chart for six weeks. On Tower Records chart, it reached fifth place.

The single sold 20,424 copies while on charts. It was the ninth best-selling indie single in Japan in 2007, according to Oricon.

== Track listing ==
All lyrics are written by Mao.

No.	Title	Length
1.	"Natsukoi" (夏恋)	4:29
2.	"Propose" (プロポーズ)	2:50
Total length:		7:20

== Personnel ==
- Mao – vocals
- Shinji – guitar
- Aki – bass
- Yūya – drums
