= Koi ni Ochite =

- Regular edition cover

Single by SID

from the album Outsider
- B-side: "Zetsubō no Hata"
- Released: April 10, 2013
- Genre: J-pop
- Length: 12:21
- Label: Ki/oon Records
- Songwriters: Mao, Aki

SID singles chronology
"V.I.P" (2012)	"Koi ni Ochite" (2013)	"Sa-Ma-La-Va" (2013)

"Koi ni Ochite" (恋におちて) is a single by Japanese rock band Sid, released on April 10, 2013, by Ki/oon Music. It was released in three editions: the regular edition with only the 3-track CD, and the limited editions A and B, which included a DVD containing the music video for "Koi ni Ochite" and live footage of "Café de Bossa" in Taiwan, which differs between the A and B versions.

== Promotion and release ==
Details of the single were announced in early February 2013.

== Composition and reception ==
"Koi ni Ochite" was composed by bassist Aki, with lyrics written by vocalist Mao as usual. CD Journal company described it as having a "catchy, minor-chord melody" and "reminiscent of Showa pop songs". They also praised Mao's vocals on the B-side track, "Zetsubō no Hata", which was composed by Shinji. Tower Records called it "a piece that encapsulates Sid's charm."

== Commercial performance ==
The single peaked at number four on weekly Oricon Albums Chart and stayed on chart for six weeks. According to the Oricon sales ranking, it is the band's 16th best-selling single. On Tower Records' Japanese Rock and Pop Singles chart, it debuted at #7.

== Track listing ==
All lyrics are written by Mao.

No.	Title	Music	Length
1.	"Koi ni Ochite" (恋におちて)	Aki	4:11
2.	"Zetsubō no Hata" (絶望の旗)	Shinji	3:45
3.	"Café de Bossa" (Live from TOUR 2012『M&W』extra in Taiwan)	Yūya	4:24
Total length:			12:21

== Personnel ==
- Mao – vocals
- Shinji – guitar
- Aki – bass
- Yūya – drums
