= Glass no Hitomi =

- Regular edition cover

Single by SID

from the album Nomad
- Released: January 18, 2017
- Recorded: near Tokyo, Japan
- Genre: Rock
- Length: 12:38
- Label: Ki/oon Records
- Songwriters: Mao, Yūya

SID singles chronology
"Hyoryu" (2015)	"Glass no Hitomi" (2017)	"Butterfly Effect" (2017)

"Glass no Hitomi" (硝子の瞳) is a single by Japanese visual kei rock band SID, released on January 18, 2017, by Ki/oon Records. It is opening theme of Kuroshitsuji: Book of the Atlantic.

== Background and release ==
In 2016, Sid took a break for the members to focus on their solo careers. In October, the single "Glass no Hitomi" was announced, the first in over a year, scheduled for January 18, 2017. It would be the opening of Kuroshitsuji: Book of the Atlantic, being the third theme song in the series made by the band, after "Monochrome no Kiss" and "Enamel". The band was offered to create the opening "between March and April", according to drummer Yūya. Single production began in May.

On December 29, 2016, a teaser of the music video was released on YouTube, which was recorded in a studio near Tokyo. The single was released in four editions: the regular edition, two limited editions and a limited anime edition. The regular edition only has the tracks "Glass no Hitomi", its instrumental version and the B-side "Chiisana Tsubasa" (チイサナツバサ). The limited edition A adds a DVD with the song's music video and its making-of and limited edition B adds a 24-page booklet. The band's name is written in katakana (シド (Shido)) on the cover for the first time since their 2010 single "Ranbu no Melody".

The anime limited edition has a different cover, which shows the protagonists of Kuroshitsuji (Ciel Phantomhive and Sebastian Michaelis) instead of the band members, and comes with a bonus item. The illustration was designed by the series character designer Minako Shiba.

== Composition ==
"Glass no Hitomi" was composed by drummer Yūya and as usual, the lyrics were written by vocalist Mao.

In an interview with OK Music website, Mao said that the drummer brought the key words so he could write about it, something that doesn't usually happen among the group. In addition to writing in this theme, he kept in mind that it would be a theme song. The lyrics of "Chiisana Tsubasa" are about Mao's feelings regarding his break from the band the previous year.

Yūya said that when reading the anime's story, he felt a "sad feeling" and then composed the song with the image of "fighting while crying". Despite this, he said that he tried to incorporate not only the atmosphere of the anime, but also the atmosphere of the band. Aki added that the song "does not have an exciting chorus", but rather "a beginning, development and conclusion".

Regarding equipment and instruments, guitarist Shinji stated:

"Recently, I've been wanting to play the basic guitar from beginning to end without recording it separately, so I've been playing it several times and using the best takes. It's a song that has some fluffy parts and some sharp parts, so I wanted to play it with different dynamics in one performance, so I went with an analog method."

Yūya added:

"I was very sensitive about the sound, and this time I aimed for a drum sound that wasn't too expansive by using a compressor (a device that has the effect of reducing the difference in the strength of the sound). Overall, I wanted to try out a sound with good separation between each part, so I bought most of the drum parts."

Finally, bassist Aki said:

"I also bought new equipment. I didn't want to destroy the ephemerality of the song, so I created a bass sound for the overall sound. We focused on creating a balance that allows you to feel the bass even when listening to a small speaker, rather than having a sound pressure that you would only feel at an explosive level."

The music video, which features the members performing, has been described as "cold", "inorganic", "dynamic" and "static". Mao recalled that it had been a while since the group recorded a video with a "band feel".

== Commercial performance ==
It reached fifth place on Oricon Albums Chart and stayed on chart for seven weeks. On Japan's Tower Records singles chart, it reached second place.

== Track listing ==
All lyrics are written by Mao.

No.	Title	Music	Length
1.	"Glass no Hitomi" (硝子の瞳)	Yūya	4:01
2.	"Chiisana Tsubasa" (チイサナツバサ)		3:45
3.	"Glass no Hitomi" (Instrumental)	Yūya	4:01
Total length:			12:38

Limited edition A
No.	Title	Length
1.	"Glass no Hitomi" (music video)
2.	"Glass no Hitomi" (making-of and photo session)

== Personnel ==
- Mao – vocals
- Shinji – guitar
- Aki – bass
- Yūya – drums
