= Hosoi Koe =

- Regular edition cover

Single by SID

from the album Play
- Language: Japanese
- B-side: "dummy"
- Released: February 8, 2006
- Length: 8:00
- Label: Danger Crue
- Composer: Shinji
- Lyricist: Mao

SID singles chronology
"Sweet?" (2003)	"Hosoi Koe" (2006)	"Chapter 1" (2007)

Music video
- "Hosoi Koe" on YouTube

"Hosoi Koe" (ホソイコエ) is a single by Japanese band SID, released on February 8, 2006, by Danger Crue as the first single from the album Play.

== Promotion and release ==
The single was announced in late 2005, along with a spring tour for 2006. It was released in three editions: one regular and two limited editions. The regular edition contains the CD with the title track and the B-side “dummy” and a 12-page booklet. The limited editions include, in addition to the CD, a recording of the 2005 concert at NHK Hall, which differs between versions A and B.

"Hosoi Koe" was composed by guitarist Shinji, with lyrics written by Mao.

== Commercial performance ==
“Hosoi Koe” reached number eighteen on Oricon Singles Chart, staying on chart for five weeks. On Tower Records' Japanese rock and pop singles chart, it reached second place. It sold 14,974 copies while it was on charts.

== Reception and musical style ==
CD Journal stated that the title track is a winter ballad, praising the vocals, while the B-side is a "strong taste" rock ‘n’ roll song. The visual kei portal Visunavi "super recommended" the single.

== Track listing ==
All lyrics are written by Mao.

No.	Title	Music	Length
1.	"Hosoi Koe" (ホソイコエ)	Shinji	5:07
2.	"dummy"		2:52
Total length:			8:00

== Personnel ==
- Mao – vocals
- Shinji – guitar
- Aki – bass
- Yūya – drums
