= Mitsuyubi =

- Regular edition cover

Single by SID

from the album Sentimental Macchiato
- B-side: "Chiisana Shiawase"
- Released: September 26, 2007
- Genre: Rock'n'roll; jazz
- Length: 7:21
- Label: Danger Crue Records
- Composer: Shinji
- Lyricist: Mao

SID singles chronology
"Natsukoi" (2007)	"Mitsuyubi" (2007)	"Namida no Ondo" (2007)

Music video
- "Mitsuyubi" on YouTube

"Mitsuyubi" (蜜指〜ミツユビ〜) is a single by Japanese rock band SID, released on September 26, 2007, by Danger Crue Records. It was used as theme song for Nippon TV's variety show Megami no Hatena. It was included on the studio album Sentimental Macchiato and on SID All Singles Best compilation album.

"Mitsuyubi" was SID's third single released in 2007, following "Smile" and "Natsukoi", and was followed by "Namida no Ondo" in the same year. It was released in three editions. The regular edition featured the CD with the title track and the B-side Chiisana Shiawase (小さな幸せ), as well as a photo booklet. The limited editions, in addition to the CD, came with a DVD recorded at a show on the Re:play tour and a bonus video. The bonus video differs between version A and B.

== Musical style and reception ==
Sarah from Jame World described the song as having an "jazzy, upbeat tune", while the guitar solo would be a stylistic change to rock'n'roll that "doesn't feel at all misplaced". Regarding the other instruments, she cited the strong bass lines and praised the drums. CD Journal website cited that the arrangement has the quality of a non-independent band.

Regarding "Chiisana Shiawase" (小さな幸せ), CD Journal described it as folk rock, also described this way by Jame in other words: Sarah cited enka-inspired vocals and praised the guitar melody.

== Commercial performance ==
"Mitsuyubi" was the band's first single to reach the top 5 of Oricon Singles Chart and stayed on chart for 6 weeks. On the Oricon indies chart, it ranked first. In Tower Records' Japanese Rock & Pop Singles ranking, it reached third place.

It sold 23,697 copies while on Oricon chart, becoming the band's 20th best-selling single.

== Track listing ==
All lyrics are written by Mao.

No.	Title	Length
1.	"Mitsuyubi" (蜜指〜ミツユビ〜)	3:23
2.	"Chiisana Shiawase" (小さな幸せ)	3:58
Total length:		7:21

== Personnel ==
- Mao – vocals
- Shinji – guitar
- Aki – bass
- Yūya – drums
