= Rasen no Yume =

- Regular edition cover

Single by SID

from the album Nomad
- Released: August 2, 2017
- Genre: Rock
- Length: 4:00
- Label: Ki/oon Records
- Songwriters: Mao, Aki

SID singles chronology
"Butterfly Effect" (2017)	"Rasen no Yume" (2017)	"Sono Mirai e" (2019)

"Rasen no Yume" (螺旋のユメ) is a single by Japanese visual kei band SID, released on August 2, 2017, by Ki/oon Music. It is the first opening theme of Altair: A Record of Battles anime. Voice actor Ayumu Murase, who plays the anime's main character, covered the song for the tribute album Sid Tribute Album -Anime Songs- (2023).

== Release ==
The single was announced in early July 2017, already decided as the opening theme for Altair: A Record of Battles. A short version of the music video of "Rasen no Yume" was released on YouTube on July 22 and the full version was made available on Gyao! streaming service for a limited time, until July 31. Directed by Yasuhiro Arafune, the video was made with computer graphics and shows a knight in armor rescuing a princess taken hostage.

The single was released in three editions: regular, limited and anime limited edition. The regular edition has only the CD with two tracks, "Rasen no Yume" and its instrumental version, while the limited edition comes with a DVD containing the music video and its making-of. The anime edition is the longest in length and has a different cover, showing the main character of Altair: A Record of Battles. It contains the TV shortened version of the song on the CD, as well as the music video and the anime's opening video without the credits.

== Musical style ==
The lyrics for "Rasen no Yume" were written by vocalist Mao, as usual, and the music was composed by bassist Aki. The song was created especially for the anime, matching the story, after Mao read the manga. Aki said that a demo was already in preparation before being chosen as the anime's soundtrack, with a "normal" melody. After choosing, they rearranged the work and its melody to better fit the theme.

CD Journal website stated that the song has a "fast-paced melody" and "clear vocals". Real Sound said that the story of the song is reminiscent of the Middle Ages, as well as Altair: A Record of Battles, and addresses the emotions of the manga such as battles. Regarding the song, he called the drums "danceable" and the bass line "tight", saying that the song in general plays with "light strings" and mentioned the guitar solo at the end. The website also mentioned that "Rasen no Yume" has a unique pop style, matching the "charm" of visual kei. Ayumu Murase and Real Sound praised SID's ability (especially Mao's lyrics and Aki's composition) to faithfully express the anime's themes.

== Commercial performance ==
The single reached number 18 on weekly Oricon Albums Chart and stayed on chart for three weeks.

== Track listing ==
=== Regular edition ===
All lyrics are written by Mao.

CD
No.	Title	Length
1.	"Rasen no Yume" (螺旋のユメ)	4:00
2.	"Rasen no Yume" (Instrumental)	4:00
Total length:		8:01

=== Limited edition ===
DVD
No.	Title	Length
1.	"Rasen no Yume" (Music video)
2.	"Rasen no Yume" (Photo Session/Music Video Making)

=== Anime edition ===
Bonus track
No.	Title	Length
3.	"Rasen no Yume" (TV Size)	1:30

DVD
No.	Title	Length
1.	"Rasen no Yume" (Music video)	4:02
2.	"Shōkoku no Altair Non Credits Opening" (「将国のアルタイル」オープニングノンクレジット映像)	1:30
Total length:		15:32

== Personnel ==
- Mao – vocals
- Shinji – guitar
- Aki – bass
- Yūya – drums
