= Play (Sid album) =

- Regular edition cover

Studio album by SID
- Released: November 8, 2006
- Genre: Rock
- Length: 48:41
- Language: Japanese
- Label: Danger Crue Records

SID chronology
Hoshi no Miyako (2006)	Play (2006)	Sentimental Macchiato (2008)

Singles from Play
- 1. "Hosoi Koe" Released: February 8, 2006; 2. "Chapter 1" Released: June 14, 2006; 3. "Otegami" Released: August 16, 2006

Play is the third studio album by Japanese visual kei rock band SID, released on November 8, 2006, by Danger Crue Records. It was released in three editions: a regular and two limited editions. The album's singles are "Hosoi Koe", "Chapter 1", ending theme of CDTV television program, and "Otegami", theme of Rank Oukoku television series, all released in 2006.

Music website CD Journal, reviewing the album, commented: "A rewarding work full of pure rock sounds led by refreshing vocals".

The album was supported by TOUR 06⇒07 "play" , with 13 shows in Japan.

== Commercial performance ==
Play reached number nine on Oricon Albums Chart, stayed on chart for ten weeks and sold 29,494 copies while on chart.

"Hosoi Koe", "Chapter 1" and "Otegami" reached 18th, 10th and 9th position and were the 14th, 10th and 7th best-selling independent single of 2006 in Japan, respectively, according to Oricon.

== Track listing ==
All lyrics are written by Mao.

No.	Title	Music	Length
1.	"Yogoreta Yubi" (汚れた指)	Aki	3:41
2.	"Room"	Yūya	3:45
3.	"Chapter 1"	Aki	4:38
4.	"Shiroi Blouse Kawaii Hito" (白いブラウス 可愛い人)	Aki	4:08
5.	"Shutter Speed" (シャッタースピード)	Shinji	3:48
6.	"Slow" (スロウ)	Aki	3:54
7.	"Milk" (ミルク)	Aki	5:09
8.	"Wana" (罠)	Shinji	3:37
9.	"Hosoi Koe" (ホソイコエ)	Shinji	5:07
10.	"Otegami" (御手紙)	Aki	3:44
11.	"Park"	Aki	2:54
12.	"Live"		4:07
Total length:			48:41

== Personnel ==
- Mao – vocals
- Shinji – guitar
- Aki – bass
- Yūya – drums
