= Outsider (Sid album) =

- Regular edition cover

Studio album by SID
- Released: March 12, 2014
- Genre: Rock
- Length: 40:48
- Language: Japanese
- Label: Ki/oon Records

SID chronology
M&W (2012)	Outsider (2014)	Nomad (2018)

Singles from Nomad
- 1. "V.I.P" Released: November 21, 2012; 2. "Koi ni Ochite" Released: April 10, 2013; 3. "Sa-Ma-La-Va" Released: July 24, 2013; 4. "Anniversary" Released: November 6, 2013; 5. "Hug" Released: February 12, 2014

Outsider is the eighth studio album by Japanese visual kei rock band SID, released on March 12, 2014, by Ki/oon Records. The singles included are "V.I.P", "Anniversary", opening themes of Magi: The Labyrinth of Magic, "Koi ni Ochite" (恋におちて), "Sa-Ma-La-Va" (サマラバ) and "Hug".

== Background and promotion ==
Outsider was released on March 12, 2014, in three editions: the regular edition with only the 11-track CD, and limited editions A and B, containing a DVD with a version of the Nippon Budokan show "Visual BANG! ~SID 10th Anniversary FINAL PARTY~" each. In addition, the first buyers of the album received a poster until stocks ran out and buyers of the limited edition received an invitation to participate in a meet&greet event with the band members.

The title was chosen by vocalist Mao, who told Barks website that there is no deep meaning in the choice, and the word "Sid" is included in the word "Outsider". In the order of tracks, he started by deciding which would be the first and which one would be the last.

The tour supporting Outsider took place from April to July 2014 and recordings of the shows were released on the live album Sid Tour 2014 Outsider, having the same name as the tour, on March 18, 2015. A tour limited to fan members club also occurred soon after.

== Critical reception ==
Allmusic gave the album 2.5 of 5 stars and a mixed review, concluding that "it is a supreme irony that Sid have called the safest, stalest, most lightweight album of their career", after stating "It's not that this is a bad album per se, just one that plays it very, very safe. That said, it's impossible to entirely dislike." Music website CD Journal said Outsider is "a super strong album packed with all of Sid."

== Commercial performance ==
Outsider reached number five on Oricon Albums Chart and stayed on chart for 9 weeks. It ranked fourth on Tower Records' Japanese Rock & Pop Albuns chart, and ranked between sixth and third place of retail's five stores in Japan.

"V.I.P", "Anniversary", "Koi ni Ochite", "Sa-Ma-La-Va" and "Hug" reached 4th, 6th, 4th, 7th and 6th place on Oricon Singles Chart, respectively.

== Track listing ==
All lyrics are written by Mao.

No.	Title	Music	Length
1.	"Laser"	Shinji	3:32
2.	"Candy"	Yūya	3:16
3.	"V.I.P"	Aki	3:13
4.	"Akai Te" (赤い手)	Aki	4:28
5.	"Music"	Aki	3:42
6.	"Sa-Ma-La-Va" (サマラバ)	Aki	3:29
7.	"Koi ni Ochite" (恋におちて)	Aki	4:09
8.	"Meiro" (迷路)	Yūya	4:24
9.	"Darling"	Aki	4:07
10.	"Hug"	Aki	4:50
11.	"Anniversary"	Aki	4:09
Total length:			44:06

DVD

Limited edition A bonus tracks
No.	Title	Length
1.	"[VISUAL BANG!-SID 10TH ANNIVERSARY FINAL PARTY-] LIVE FILMS VER.A"

Limited edition B bonus tracks
No.	Title	Length
1.	"[VISUAL BANG!-SID 10TH ANNIVERSARY FINAL PARTY-] LIVE FILMS VER.B"

== Personnel ==
- Mao – vocals
- Shinji – guitar
- Aki – bass
- Yūya – drums
