= Altair: A Record of Battles =

Japanese manga series by Kotono Kato

- First tankōbon volume cover, featuring Tuğril Mahmut

将国のアルタイル (Shōkoku no Arutairu)
- Genre: Historical fantasy
- Manga
- Written by: Kotono Kato
- Published by: Kodansha
- English publisher: NA: Kodansha USA
- Magazine: Monthly Shōnen Sirius
- Original run: July 26, 2007 – November 25, 2023
- Volumes: 27
- Manga

Shōkoku no Altair-san
- Written by: Shiina Soga
- Published by: Kodansha
- Magazine: Monthly Shōnen Sirius
- Original run: April 26, 2012 – September 26, 2013
- Volumes: 1
- Manga

Shōkoku no Altair Gaiden: Tōkoku no Subaru
- Written by: Hirokazu Kobayashi
- Illustrated by: Chika Kato
- Published by: Kodansha
- Magazine: Monthly Shōnen Sirius
- Original run: January 26, 2016 – April 26, 2019
- Volumes: 7
- Anime television series
- Directed by: Kazuhiro Furuhashi
- Written by: Noboru Takagi
- Music by: Ryo Kawasaki
- Studio: MAPPA
- Licensed by: Amazon Prime Video (expired): EA/SEA: Medialink
- Original network: MBS, TBS, BS-TBS, BSN
- Original run: July 7, 2017 – December 22, 2017
- Episodes: 24
- icon

Altair: A Record of Battles (Japanese: 将国のアルタイル, Hepburn: Shōkoku no Arutairu) is a Japanese manga series written and illustrated by Kotono Kato. It tells the story of Tuğril Mahmut, a young military officer and his exploits to protect his country from invasion by a neighboring empire. The manga was serialized in Kodansha's shōnen manga magazine Monthly Shōnen Sirius from July 2007 to November 2023, with its chapters collected in 27 tankōbon volumes.

A 24-episode anime television series adaptation, produced by MAPPA, aired from July to December 2017. Amazon Prime Video streamed the series worldwide as it aired in Japan.

In 2017, Altair: A Record of Battles won the 41st Kodansha Manga Awards in the shōnen category.

== Plot ==
Set in the western part of the great continent Rumeliana, Mahmut is a young war orphan and the youngest Pasha in the Turkish stratocracy who desires to ensure that war never occurs. Unfortunately, after an assassination of a politician, Turkey is under the looming threat of the militaristic Balt-Rhein Empire. After playing a vital role in solving two schemes within his country, Mahmut sets out on a journey to see more the outside world, only to witness Balt-Rhein's growing influence on the continent. To protect his homeland, Mahmut and his companions travel across West Rumeliana to form alliances between his country and the other nations to face against the Balt-Rhein Empire and their frightening expansionist movement. With the creation of the Tripartite Military Alliance with Greater Turkey, Republic of Venedik, and Urado Kingdom, and the cooperation of the Cuore Alliance, the Anti-Imperial Alliance battles against the Balt-Rhein Empire in the Great Rumeliana War.

== Media ==
=== Manga ===
Written and illustrated by Kotono Kato, Altair: A Record of Battles started in Kodansha's shōnen manga magazine Monthly Shōnen Sirius on July 26, 2007. The series finished on November 25, 2023. Kodansha collected its chapters in 27 tankōbon volumes, published from April 23, 2008, to April 9, 2024.

Kodansha's North American subsidiary Kodansha USA announced that it would release the series in English via its digital platform, starting on March 21, 2017.

==== Other manga ====
A four-panel manga, titled Shōkoku no! (将国の!) was published on Monthly Shōnen Sirius's website in 2012. A short, comedic chibi-styled manga by Shiina Soga, titled Shōkoku no Altair-san (小国のアルタイルさん, Shōkoku no Arutairu-san; "Altair of the Tiny Nation"), started in Monthly Shōnen Sirius on April 26, 2012, and finished on September 26, 2013, (Note: Finished in the magazine's November 2013 issue, released on September 26.) with its 21 chapters collected in a single tankōbon volume, released on October 9 of that same year. A special chapter of Shōkoku no Altair-san was published in Monthly Shōnen Sirius on August 26, 2017.

A spin-off, titled Shōkoku no Altair Gaiden: Tōkoku no Subaru (将国のアルタイル嵬伝 嶌国のスバル, Shōkoku no Arutairu Gaiden Tōkoku no Subaru; "Altair: A Record of Battles – Side Story: Subaru of the Island Nation"), written by Hirokazu Kobayashi and illustrated by Kotono Kato's sister, Chika Kato, was serialized in Monthly Shōnen Sirius from January 26, 2016, to April 26, 2019. The series is set far to the east of Rumeliana, where the more Asian-influence countries exist and takes roughly six months ahead of the main series. The plot focus on the island nation of Kusanagi, which has been annexed by the larger country of Çinili and fallen into ruin. Subaru masquerades as the nation's former prince and tries to leads a rebellion to free her country. Kodansha collected its chapters in seven tankōbon volumes, released from January 17, 2017, to September 9, 2019.

=== Anime ===
In December 2016, Aniplex opened a website announcing that Kazuhiro Furuhashi was directing a "Project Altair" anime series at MAPPA, but did not state any other specifics. Later that month, images from the official website of Monthly Shonen Sirius revealed that "Project Altair" was an adaptation of Altair: A Record of Battles. Script composition is handled by Noboru Takagi while Ryo Kawasaki composed the music. The series aired from July 7 to December 22, 2017, on the MBS "Animeism" programming block.

Amazon Prime Video has exclusively streamed the series in more than 200 countries worldwide, and its "Anime Strike" channel simulcast the series as it aired in Japan. The anime series released the first Blu-ray/DVD set and its limited editions bundles with bonus booklet, a Soundtrack CD, and Drama CD on October 25, 2017. The second Blu-ray/DVD set and its limited editions bundles with bonus booklet, another Soundtrack CD, and DJCD of the series's Radio Broadcast was released on December 27, 2017. The third Blu-ray/DVD set and its limited editions bundles with bonus booklet, another Soundtrack CD, and another Drama CD was released on February 28, 2018. The fourth and final Blu-ray/DVD set and its limited editions bundles with bonus booklet, animation drawings, and another DJCD of the series's Radio Broadcast was released on April 25, 2018. Medialink licensed the series in East and Southeast Asia, streaming it on its Ani-One Asia YouTube channel.

=== Other media ===
On November 29, 2014, Kotono Kato released an illustration book titled Milkazzar Altair The Shōkoku no Altair Illustration Gallery Book (ミルカザル・アルタイル 将国のアルタイルイラストギャラリーBOOK) for Altair: A Record of Battles. On October 6, 2017, another art book, titled Shōkoku no Altair Artbook (画集 将国のアルタイル), containing over 170 illustrations, was released to mark a decade of serialization.

On August 9, 2017, an official fanbook titled Official Fanbook of Shōkoku no Altair Book of Stars (将国のアルタイル公式ファンブック 将星の書) was released, containing both illustrations, background, and characters profiles of the series; A preview of the booklet with rough sketches was released in Monthly Shōnen Sirius on August 26 of that same year.

== Reception ==
Altair: A Record of Battles won the 41st Kodansha Manga Awards in the shōnen category in 2017.
