= V.I.P (Sid song) =

- Regular edition cover

Single by SID

from the album Outsider
- Released: November 21, 2012
- Genre: J-pop
- Length: 10:58
- Label: Ki/oon Records
- Songwriters: Mao, Aki, Shinji

SID singles chronology
"S" (2012)	"V.I.P" (2012)	"Koi ni Ochite" (2012)

"V.I.P" is a single by Japanese rock band SID, released on November 21, 2012, by Ki/oon Records. It is opening theme of the anime Magi: The Labyrinth of Magic. The song ranked in second place at the 35th Anime Grand Prix in the best anime song category.

"V.I.P" was featured on Outsider album and Sid 10th Anniversary Best and SID Anime Best 2008-2017 compilations. The group Morfonica covered the song and released on the album Bang Dream! Girls Band Party! Cover Collection Vol. 6 in 2021.

== Promotion and release ==
V.I.P was announced in September as SID's third single of 2012 and the opening theme for Magi. The song premiered on the series on October 7.

It was released in four editions: regular, limited A and B and a special limited edition. The regular edition had only the three tracks on CD: "V.I.P", the B-side "Soumatou" and a live recording of "Sympathy". In addition to the CD, Limited editions A and B came with a different DVD for each version. The special edition included the anime version of "V.I.P" and its instrumental version.

== Musical style ==
CD Journal website described the song as energetic, lively and dynamic with a typical melody for the band.

== Commercial performance ==
"V.I.P" peaked at number four on weekly Oricon Albums Chart and stayed on chart for eleven weeks. On Tower Records J-rock and J-pop singles chart, it ranked 19th. On Billboard, it reached seventh place on the Hot 100, second at Hot Animation and third on Top Singles Sales.

In January 2014, it was certified gold disc by RIAJ for selling more than 100.000 digital copies.

== Track listing ==
All lyrics are written by Mao.

No.	Title	Music	Length
1.	"V.I.P"	Aki	3:14
2.	"Soumatou" (走馬灯)	Shinji	4:00
3.	"Sympathy" (Live from TOUR 2012 M&W)	AKi	4:43
Total length:			10:58

== Personnel ==
- Mao – vocals
- Shinji – guitar
- Aki – bass
- Yūya – drums
