= Black Butler: Book of the Atlantic =

2017 Japanese animated film

- Key visual

Japanese name
- Kanji: 劇場版「黒執事 Book of the Atlantic」
Transcriptions
- Revised Hepburn: Gekijō-ban Kuroshitsuji: Book of the Atlantic
- Directed by: Noriyuki Abe
- Screenplay by: Hiroyuki Yoshino
- Based on: Black Butler by Yana Toboso
- Produced by: Yasutaka Kimura; Hiroshi Kamei; Natsumi Mori; Ayako Yokoyama; Tomomi Kyōtani
- Starring: Daisuke Ono; Maaya Sakamoto; Yukari Tamura; Junichi Suwabe; Jun Fukuyama; Kenn; Noriaki Sugiyama; Takuma Terashima; Hiroki Tōchi; Yūki Kaji; Emiri Katō
- Cinematography: Yukihiro Masumoto
- Edited by: Masahiro Goto
- Music by: Yasunori Mitsuda
- Production companies: A-1 Pictures; Aniplex; Square Enix Company
- Distributed by: Aniplex
- Release date: January 21, 2017
- Running time: 100 minutes
- Country: Japan
- Language: Japanese
- Box office: $248,286 (US & Canada)

Black Butler: Book of the Atlantic (Japanese: 劇場版「黒執事 Book of the Atlantic」, Hepburn: Gekijō-ban Kuroshitsuji: Book of the Atlantic) is a 2017 Japanese animated supernatural disaster film based on the Black Butler manga series written and illustrated by Yana Toboso. The film was produced by A-1 Pictures, directed by Noriyuki Abe and written by Hiroyuki Yoshino, featuring character designs by Minako Shiba and music by Yasunori Mitsuda. It premiered in Japan on January 21, 2017. It covers the "Luxury Liner" (豪華客船, Gōka Kyakusen) arc, the sixth arc of the manga series.

A few months after its Japanese release, Funimation announced that they had licensed and would screen the film in a limited theatrical release in North America later in June of that year.

== Plot ==
The story is based on the sinking of the Titanic in 1912. Young earl Ciel Phantomhive, alongside his demon butler Sebastian Michaelis and his manor's footman Snake, boards the luxury liner Campania on her maiden voyage to New York in order to investigate a mysterious group known as the Aurora Society, rumored to be holding an event onboard where they will showcase the raising of the dead. Also on board the vessel is Ciel's fiancée Elizabeth Midford, traveling alongside her parents and brother, and Ronald Knox, a Grim Reaper disguised as an ordinary passenger.

Three days into the journey, Ciel and Sebastian infiltrate the secret gathering of the Aurora Society, where they encounter two familiar faces: the Viscount of Druitt, a nobleman with ties to the Society, and Undertaker, a funeral director and one of Ciel's contacts in London's criminal underworld. The Society's founder, Doctor Rian Stoker, presents a large machine that he uses to reanimate the corpse of a woman. However, when her parents are brought forward for a reunion, she bites into her mother's neck, causing the audience to flee in panic. Sebastian attempts to subdue the zombie-like woman, but is unable to defeat her through normal means until Ronald appears and crushes her head with his lawnmower-like Death Scythe. He reveals that he was ordered by Grim Reaper Dispatch to investigate the reports of reanimated corpses, and attacks Sebastian in order to prevent the incidents from being written off as the meddling of a demon. As the two battle, Ciel pursues the fleeing doctor into the ship's cargo hold.

In the hold, Ciel discovers Elizabeth and Snake searching for him, and defends them against a second zombie-like man before discovering that the cargo hold is full of coffins, from which dozens more zombies emerge. As passengers are about to start dying, Ronald departs to get to work, freeing Sebastian to come to Ciel's aid and slaughter the horde. Afterwards, the group corners and interrogates Doctor Stoker, who reveals in a panic that the ship has a second, larger cargo hold, in which ten times as many awakening corpses are stored. In a communications room, the Campania's crew receives an urgent warning from a ship traveling ahead, but are attacked by zombies before they can deliver it to the captain as similar chaos breaks out all over the ship. Stoker claims that his cabin holds a device that will stop the horde, and Ciel forces him to bring them there. Meanwhile, Sebastian briefly leaves the group to ensure the safety of Elizabeth's family and teach them how to properly dispatch the zombies, but as they are capable swordsmen, they refuse to let Sebastian aid in their escape, choosing instead to assist the survivors.

Ronald begins to reap the souls of the ship's passengers. In the ship's crow's nest, two crewmen spot a large iceberg in the ship's path, the obstacle that the ship ahead had sent a warning about. As he works, Ronald complains about how much work the incident is going to make for only two Grim Reapers, and chainsaw-wielding reaper Grell Sutcliff leaps onboard from the iceberg as it scrapes into the side of the ship.

The ship begins to flood. Sebastian closes the ship's emergency doors, but in the hold, the closing doors separate Ciel and Elizabeth from Snake, Stoker, and a collection of Aurora Society members as the water begins to rise. Stoker quickly uses the opportunity to escape via an elevator, stranding the others. After analyzing the damage to the ship, Sebastian descends into the flooding zones to help Ciel and Elizabeth escape to the lifeboats, but is intercepted by the duo of reapers and separated from them again. In the flooding hallway, Ciel trips over debris and hurts his leg, and Elizabeth is set upon by a group of zombies. After tearfully apologizing to Ciel, she reveals herself to be just as capable with a sword as the rest of her family, and swiftly dispatches the horde in the hallway as a flashback plays, showing that she wanted to stay "cute" so Ciel wouldn't be intimidated or outshone by her dangerous side. The reapers set out to pursue Stoker, and after sending Elizabeth and Snake off on the lifeboats, Ciel and Sebastian do the same.

Stoker is intercepted and interrogated by the reapers, but after bringing them to his cabin, they find the device missing. Searching for Stoker in the halls of the ship, Ciel and Sebastian instead encounter the Viscount of Druitt, who has the device in his possession, and Undertaker, who is helping carry it. They follow him into a grand foyer, where Stoker and the reapers shortly appear. The Viscount gives a grand speech about using the device to build an empire while the others fight off an approaching horde of zombies, but after they persuade him into activating it, the device does nothing, sending Undertaker into a fit of laughter.

Fed up, Grell attempts to kill the Viscount, but Undertaker intervenes, blocking her chainsaw with a sotoba from inside his cloak. Without his hat, his distinctive green eyes can be seen, revealing that he, too, is a Grim Reaper. He admits to being the mastermind behind the reanimation method the Aurora Society was using, and that the zombies are his creations, the Bizarre Dolls. He explains that the reanimation works by appending false footage to the end of a corpse's Cinematic Record (their soul's record of memories and experiences, represented by a reel of film). Sebastian and the reapers attack, each wanting him in their own custody for their own reasons, but Undertaker reveals that the first sotoba is a disguised Death Scythe, defeating the reapers swiftly with its true form. He then puts Ciel in peril, forcing Sebastian to leave himself open for a scythe wound directly through the chest.

Through the wound, Sebastian's Cinematic Record spills out, playing a flashback to when Sebastian and Ciel first met and signed a demonic contract together, as well as their time spent adjusting to the lives of an earl and his butler. In the flashback, after Ciel reattains his noble title, he reaffirms his commitment to revenge at all costs on those who killed the rest of his family, the condition upon which Sebastian may finally devour his soul. The wound is not fatal, though, and before Undertaker can finish Sebastian off, the tilt of the ship becomes nearly vertical, causing Stoker to fall to his death and the reapers to leap into action for one final fight. After Ciel manages to snatch Undertaker's string of funeral lockets, Undertaker uses his Death Scythe to slice the ship in half and disappears.

Sebastian and Ciel fall into the water as the two halves of the ship sink, and Sebastian retrieves a stray lifeboat for them to use. There is only a moment of peace, though, before the Bizarre Dolls rise from the water and begin swarming the lifeboat, drawn to Ciel's human soul. Knowing that the Dolls will attack the other survivors in the distant lifeboats should they attempt an escape, the wounded Sebastian has no choice but to fight all of them himself to protect Ciel. By the time he has killed the last of them, the sun is rising, and a rescue boat has arrived to collect the survivors. Ciel praises Sebastian for his good work and orders him to rest once they've reached safety.

In a post-credits scene, Grim Reaper William T. Spears rescues Grell and Ronald from the shipwreck and scolds them for failing to collect all of the souls from the incident, while Ciel reunites with Elizabeth aboard the rescue boat.

== Voice cast ==
Character	Japanese	English
Sebastian Michaelis	Daisuke Ono	J. Michael Tatum
Ciel Phantomhive	Maaya Sakamoto	Brina Palencia
Elizabeth Midford	Yukari Tamura	Cherami Leigh
Undertaker	Junichi Suwabe	John Swasey
Grell Sutcliff	Jun Fukuyama	Daniel Frederick
Ronald Knox	Kenn	Joel McDonald
William T. Spears	Noriaki Sugiyama	Barry Yandell
Snake	Takuma Terashima	Spike Spencer
Baldroy	Hiroki Tōchi	Ian Sinclair
Finnian	Yūki Kaji	Jason Liebrecht
Mey-Rin	Emiri Katō	Monica Rial
Tanaka	Shunji Fujimura	R. Bruce Elliott
Charles Grey	Ryōhei Kimura	Clifford Chapin
Charles Phipps	Tomoaki Maeno	Brandon Potter
Aleister Chamber (Viscount of Druitt)	Tatsuhisa Suzuki	Todd Haberkorn
Edward Midford	Seiichirō Yamashita	Justin Briner
Rian Stoker	Kaito Ishikawa	Dave Trosko
Francis Midford	Atsuko Tanaka	Elizabeth Maxwell
Alexis Leon Midford	Jouji Nakata	Jeremy Schwartz
Lau	Kōji Yusa	Jerry Jewell
Madam Red	Romi Park	Lydia Mackay

== Production ==
An animated film adaptation of the manga was announced on the official anime's Twitter account on October 10, 2015, with the cast from the anime television returning to reprise their roles in the film. It was later revealed in February 2016 that the film would be an adaptation of the manga's Gōka Kyakusen story arc (volumes 11–14), titled Black Butler: Book of the Atlantic, with the main staff from the Black Butler: Book of Circus anime television series also returning. The film was released in Japanese theaters on January 21, 2017. Sid performed the film's theme song, titled "Glass no Hitomi" (硝子の瞳, "Garasu no Hitomi").
