= Disney Twisted-Wonderland =

- Developer: f4samurai
- Publishers: JP: Aniplex; NA: Aniplex of America
- Designer: Yana Toboso
- Artists: Wataru Osakabe; ATELIER MUSA
- Composers: Takumi Ozawa; Half HP Studio
- Platforms: Android, iOS
- Release: JP: March 18, 2020; NA: January 20, 2022
- Genres: Adventure, rhythm
- Mode: Single-player

Disney Twisted-Wonderland (ディズニー ツイステッドワンダーランド, Dizunī Tsuisuteddo Wandārando) is a Japanese mobile game created by Aniplex and Walt Disney Japan. Yana Toboso, creator of the manga series Black Butler, is in charge of the original plan, main script, and character designs, which are inspired by Disney villains from various franchises. The game was first launched in Japan on March 18, 2020. An English localization was released on January 20, 2022, in the United States and Canada.

== Gameplay ==
The genre of Disney Twisted-Wonderland is described as a "Villains Academy ADV (adventure game)". It is described to have a "basic gameplay system" consisting of three main elements: Lessons, Stories, and Exams.

Twisted-Wonderland operates a gacha game model that allows players to obtain random new characters by spending the in-game currency of Magic Keys, which are obtained through the in-game shop, or Magic Gems. The characters players obtain can be leveled by having them attend "Lessons" and using the items obtained from said lessons. Players can test the strength of their characters through exams, which test specific elements that switch periodically. Players place their characters in battle to score points depending on their team's strength. Players then achieve a rank depending on their point score, with higher ranks giving higher rewards.

A system function was introduced to the Japanese version of the game on May 30, 2022, called the Guest Room. It allows players to freely customize and enjoy the "Guest Room" of the Ramshackle dorm while inviting their favorite characters (of the cards they have) to visit.

== Plot ==
Yuu, whose name can also be chosen by the player, is summoned to another world by a magic mirror and arrives at a magical school, Night Raven College. The school's headmaster gives Yuu an abandoned dorm to stay in while he attempts to find a way for them to go home. Yuu becomes acquainted with the school's top students, each in seven different dormitories (each based on a different Disney villain), while searching for a way home.

=== Prologue: Welcome to the Villains' World ===
Yuu is summoned to another world by a magic mirror and arrives at the magic training school, Night Raven College. Yuu has no recollection of how they were summoned there and is unable to be sent back to their original world. Through the antics of a fire-breathing magic cat monster named Grim, Yuu receives a small demonstration of the abilities some people in this new world possess.

Due to having nowhere else to go, Yuu is forced to stay at Night Raven College and act as a janitor until the headmaster, Dire Crowley, can find a way to send them home. Crowley graciously allows them to live in the haunted and run-down dormitory on the edge of campus, now called the Ramshackle Dorm. After fighting some local ghosts and being evaluated by Crowley, Yuu and Grim are allowed to stay in the dorm.

Grim and Yuu meet Ace Trappola and Deuce Spade, who inform them about the Great Seven that the seven dormitories at Night Raven College are based on. Due to Grim's antics, an expensive magical chandelier breaks during a fight, and Crowley expels the group from the school. However, they are told that if they go on a quest to retrieve a replacement mage stone for the chandelier in order to fix their mistake, their expulsion would be rescinded. They visit an abandoned mine to find one and are attacked by a monster covered in an ink-like substance called "blot".

The group fights the monster for the stone, and Yuu discovers that they are able to get normally uncooperative students to work together. As these talents would be of a huge help to Night Raven College, filled with headstrong students unwilling to work in teams, Crowley asks Yuu to become a joint-student of the school, sharing their enrollment spot with Grim.

=== Book 1: The Rose-Red Tyrant ===
On the night that Yuu and Grim are admitted to the school, Ace arrives with a magic-sealing collar on his neck, asking to stay the night. When asked about the situation, Ace replies that he angered Riddle Rosehearts by eating one slice of a tart that were meant for an unknown event, and that as punishment, he was collared. He complains about the long list of rules they must follow in his dorm, most of which seem to be unreasonable. He promises to apologize to his housewarden the next day and heads to the Heartslabyul dormitory.

They help a junior, Cater, paint some white roses red to match the rules of the dorm. He reveals that since they haven't come with an apology tart, a rule they were unaware of, they're still not allowed back in the dorm. They encounter other issues as Ace gets himself in trouble with Riddle once again during lunch and is now stuck with the collar for a longer period. They receive help from another member of the dorm, Trey, a childhood friend of Riddle's and a talented baker. He helps them bake a chestnut apology tart.

Yuu, Grim, Ace, Deuce, Cater and Trey all help taking the large tart to Riddle, and it's revealed that the party the original tarts Ace ate were meant for was the now-happening unbirthday party. They present the tart to Riddle, who angrily declares that they've broken rule 562 of the dorm by bringing a chestnut tart to an unbirthday party. Riddle then collars Deuce and Grim as well, and they are once again thrown out of the dorm. Ace decides to challenge Riddle for the position of dorm leader and loses. Riddle's excessive use of magic-blocking collars then causes several of his dorm members to speak out against his harsh punishments.

Out of frustration of people not following the rules of his dorm, Riddle uses too much magic and becomes an Overblot monster, like the one Yuu encountered in the mines. Crowley explains that when mages use too much magic, and the leftover waste product, blot, gathers in excess and causes the mages to go berserk. Grim and the Heartslabyul students defeat Riddle before he destroys the dorm.

Riddle apologizes for being so uptight about the rules and admits he doesn't really want to follow them himself. They throw a second unbirthday party at Ace's request, and Yuu, Grim and the Heartslabyul students paint the rest of the white roses red together. Riddle decides not to follow all of the dorm's rules as rigidly as he has been previously.

=== Book 2: The Usurper from the Wilds ===
Yuu learns that a televised inter-dorm tournament for the sport of "Magical Shift" ("Spelldrive" in the English version) will be held at the school. Grim wishes to participate, but the sport requires a team of seven. A series of mysterious "accidents" begin to occur, resulting in injuries to exceptional players at the sport, including Trey and a near-miss on Riddle. Crowley requests Yuu and Grim to investigate in exchange for allowing them to participate in the tournament.

Deducing that the accidents were acts of sabotage, they, alongside Ace, Deuce, and Cater, visit Savanaclaw Dorm to warn Jack Howl, a skilled Magical Shift player, that he may be a target, but he refuses their help and the group is forced into a round of the sport by the housewarden, Leona Kingscholar, which they lose. That night, Jack realizes that Leona and Ruggie causing the accidents using Ruggie's ability to force people to mirror his own actions. He criticizes Leona for his dishonesty, who coldly dismisses him. Meanwhile, Yuu meets a Diasomnia student with horns outside Ramshackle, who leaves without introducing himself. Grim names him "Hornton". The next day, the group realizes that the injuries are caused by Ruggie's magic. Jack joins the group in confronting him, deciding he wants to help.

At the tournament, Ruggie causes a stampede using his ability in an attempt to remove Malleus Draconia, the Diasomnia housewarden and the most skilled player in Night Raven, from the competition. However, he is caught out using a trick from Cater and the pre-warned Diasomnia students. Leona gives up and refuses to play for his dorm, claiming that him playing is useless if Malleus is involved, as they're bound to lose anyway. Continued taunting of his weak will causes Leona to overblot, and Yuu and the Heartslabyul students work together to defeat him.

The tournament proceeds as originally planned, with all of the dorms insisting that Savanaclaw still be allowed to participate so they can try and get revenge through the game. Yuu, Grim, Ace, Deuce, and the Ramshackle Dorm ghosts all play a special exhibition match against Savanaclaw. The tournament is ultimately won by Diasomnia, and the Savanaclaw students resolve to try harder and play fairly next year.

=== Book 3: The Merchant from the Depths ===
When end-of-term exam scores are announced, Yuu and Jack are shocked to see Grim, Ace, Deuce, and other students suddenly grow sea anemones from their heads and are dragged away to Octavinelle. It's revealed that all of them made magically binding deals with Azul Ashengrotto, the housewarden, for exam study guides, with the condition that if they failed to get above a certain rank in the school-wide results, then they would be forced to work for free in the dorm's café, the Mostro Lounge. Yuu signs a contract of their own with Azul to free their friends in exchange for a picture of Prince Rielle from the museum in the Coral Sea and is forced to offer Ramshackle Dorm as collateral. Now homeless, they are taken in by Savanaclaw, who assists them in destroying Azul's contracts and defeating him after he overblots.

=== Book 4: Schemer of the Scalding Sands ===
The students of Night Raven College return home for the winter break. With no place to return to, Crowley tasks Yuu and Grim to watch over the school's heating system. Yuu meets Jamil Viper, the vice housewarden of the Scarabia dormitory, who tells them that the Scarabia dormitory received bad results on the final exams and will remain at school during the break to study. Jamil invites Yuu to visit Scarabia headed by housewarden Kalim Al-Asim, the eldest son of a wealthy family whom Jamil serves. Yuu uncovers Jamil's plot to use mind-control magic on Kalim, causing him to overwork Scarabia's students. By turning the students against Kalim and winning their support, Jamil hopes to replace him as housewarden, frustrated for living in Kalim's shadow despite being a more capable mage than him. With the help of Octavinelle, Jamil's plans are thwarted and he is defeated after he overblots.

=== Book 5: A Beautiful Tyrant ===
The new semester has begun and Yuu, who has gotten used to their daily life, is surprised that the National Arcane Academy Culture Fair is happening at the school. Students were encouraged to audition for the fair's main event, the "Vocal & Dance Championship", and Ace, Deuce, and Grim are determined to be chosen to win the grand prize. They were taught how to dance by Kalim and Jamil, and passed the audition held at Pomefiore. Together with Vil and the others, they partake in intensive training to win the championship. On the day of the competition, Vil attempts to poison his longtime rival, Neige LeBlanche of Royal Sword Academy, but his plans are thwarted by Yuu and the others, causing Vil to overblot. After being defeated, Vil and the rest of the NRC Tribe perform, but they ultimately lose to Royal Sword Academy. Later that night, Yuu is attacked by Grim, who has gone berserk from consuming too many blot crystals.

=== Book 6: The Watchman of the Underworld ===
After Yuu is attacked by Grim, Ace and Deuce help them look for Grim together while Crowley enlists the aid of the housewardens. Idia and Ortho successfully locate and capture Grim, who is put into isolation for treatment. A few days later, the NRC Tribe are gathered by Vil at Ramshackle Dorm, who apologizes for his actions at the VDC and compensates them. Meanwhile, a mysterious armed group invades the school and kidnaps Riddle, Leona, Azul, Jamil, Vil, and Grim while Crowley is taken into custody. As the overblotters are transported to the Island of Woe, they learn that the armed group is a special magical security force called "Charon" owned by the mysterious non-governmental organization "STYX", and Idia, who is the heir to the Shroud family, is the acting director of STYX. As STYX conducts research on blot, Idia has the overblotters undergo a series of tests, while Yuu, Rook, and Epel rush to their rescue. Ortho, seeing how depressed Idia is over his future as director of STYX, decides to destroy the world by unleashing the Phantoms contained on the Island of Woe to remake it. Realizing the android Ortho has been taken over by the original Ortho in the Underworld, Idia overblots due to blot exposure, prompting the others to defeat them. In the aftermath, Yuu, Grim, and the others return to Night Raven College, and the android Ortho is rebuilt by Idia and formally enrolls as a first-year student.

=== Book 7: The Lord of Malevolence ===
Yuu has had dreams of a strange person known as Mickey. They convey this information to their first-year friends, and Ortho theorizes that Mickey's appearance in the mirror of Yuu's room means Mickey comes from another world and is trying to communicate with Yuu. The first-year students agree to help Yuu investigate Mickey in hopes of learning of how to send Yuu back home.

As the third-year students prepare for their fourth-year internships, Lilia reveals that he is dropping out from Night Raven College because his magic is gradually fading. This truth leaves Malleus devastated. Lilia throws a farewell party on the night of his departure, but unable to cope with losing Lilia, Malleus overblots and traps everyone on Sage's Island in his dream realm. Silver, whose signature spell allows him to travel into other people's dreams, saves Yuu, Grim, and Sebek to awaken Lilia, while Ortho, unaffected by Malleus's magic due to being an android, contacts STYX to formulate a plan to free everyone on Sage's Island. After waking up Idia, Yuu, Grim, Silver, and the others enter the Night Raven College students' dreams to awaken them to defeat Malleus in the real world. Lilia sacrifices himself during the battle, but is miraculously revived through Malleus's broken horn and a powerful magestone given to Silver by his biological parents. In the aftermath, Lilia's magic is restored, and Malleus and Lilia throw a celebratory party to thank everyone for allowing Malleus to return to school.

== Development ==
Aniplex announced they were producing the game in collaboration with Walt Disney Japan at Anime Japan 2019. Yana Toboso, the creator of Black Butler, was credited for the concept, scenario, and character designs.

Disney Twisted-Wonderland was officially released for play on Android and iOS in Japan on March 18, 2020. The game's opening movie is animated by Troyca and the theme song, "Piece of my world", was performed by Night Ravens.

== Reception ==
=== Player count and revenue ===
==== Japan ====
In March 2020, Disney Twisted-Wonderland reached 1.5 million downloads upon launch in Japan. It also became the third most discussed video game on Twitter in 2020. As of July 2025, the Japanese player base generates between $3–4 million in monthly revenue, while the global market contributes approximately $300,000 per month. By August 2025, Disney Twisted-Wonderland had surpassed 4.8 million downloads in Japan.

==== International ====
When localized for North America, Disney Twisted-Wonderland recorded 50,000 pre-registrations. From January 2024 to January 2025, the game experienced significant global growth, reaching a cumulative total of 4.4 million downloads by January 2025. In the second quarter of 2025, the game saw a moderate revenue increase in the United States, peaking at approximately $88,300 in mid-May. Download numbers remained relatively stable, with a slight peak of around 2,900 downloads in the same period. Active user counts consistently ranged between 68,000 and 74,000 throughout the quarter, indicating steady player engagement. By August 2025, the game reached 6 million downloads worldwide and generated over $715 million.

=== Awards ===
In 2022, Disney Twisted-Wonderland was nominated at the NAVGTR Awards in the Outstanding Game, Music or Performance-Based category. At the 10th Crunchyroll Anime Awards in 2026, the anime's Episode of Heartslabyul was nominated for Best Isekai Anime.

== Other media ==
- Disney Twisted-Wonderland

ディズニー ねじれた-不思議国 (Dizunī Tsuisuteddo Wandārando)
- Manga

Disney Twisted-Wonderland the Comic: Episode of Heartslabyul
- Written by: Wakana Hazuki
- Illustrated by: Sumire Kowono
- Published by: Square Enix
- English publisher: NA: Penguin Random House Viz Media (formerly)
- Magazine: Monthly G Fantasy
- Original run: March 18, 2021 – October 18, 2022
- Volumes: 4
- Manga

Disney Twisted-Wonderland the Comic: Episode of Savanaclaw
- Written by: Suzuka Oda
- Published by: Square Enix
- English publisher: NA: Penguin Random House Viz Media (formerly)
- Magazine: Monthly G Fantasy
- Original run: December 18, 2022 – January 17, 2026
- Volumes: 3
- Manga

Disney Twisted-Wonderland the Comic: Episode of Octavinelle
- Written by: Wakana Hazuki
- Illustrated by: Sumire Kowono
- Published by: Square Enix
- English publisher: NA: Penguin Random House Viz Media (formerly)
- Magazine: Monthly G Fantasy
- Original run: August 18, 2023 – August 18, 2025
- Volumes: 3
- Manga

Disney Twisted-Wonderland the Comic: Episode of Scarabia
- Written by: Majiko!
- Published by: Square Enix
- English publisher: NA: Penguin Random House Viz Media (formerly)
- Magazine: Monthly G Fantasy
- Original run: December 18, 2024 – present
- Original net animation

Disney Twisted-Wonderland: The Animation
- Directed by: Takahiro Natori (chief); Shin Katagai
- Written by: Takahiro Natori; Yoichi Kato
- Music by: Takumi Ozawa
- Studio: Yumeta Company; Graphinica
- Licensed by: Disney Platform Distribution
- Released: October 29, 2025 – present
- Episodes: 8

=== Manga ===
A manga adaptation, titled Disney Twisted-Wonderland the Comic: Episode of Heartslabyul, written by Wakana Hazuki and illustrated by Sumire Kowono, was serialized in Square Enix's Monthly G Fantasy magazine from March 18, 2021, to October 18, 2022. It was collected in four tankōbon volumes from September 2021 to December 2022. The manga was first licensed in English by Viz Media, until Penguin Random House licensed it in May 2025, publishing the manga under their Random House Worlds division.

A second manga adaptation, titled Disney Twisted-Wonderland the Comic: Episode of Savanaclaw, written and illustrated by Suzuka Oda, was serialized in the same magazine from December 18, 2022, to January 17, 2026.

A third manga adaptation, titled Disney Twisted-Wonderland the Comic: Episode of Octavinelle, again written by Hazuki and illustrated by Kowono, was serialized in Monthly G Fantasy from August 18, 2023, to August 18, 2025. It was collected in three tankōbon volumes from January 2024 to October 2025.

A fourth manga adaptation, titled Disney Twisted-Wonderland the Comic: Episode of Scarabia, written and illustrated by Magiko! began serialization in the same magazine on December 18, 2024.

==== Episode of Heartslabyul ====
| No. | Original release date | Original ISBN | English release date | English ISBN |
|---|---|---|---|---|
| 1 | September 27, 2021 | 978-4-7575-7496-0 | July 11, 2023 | 978-1-9747-3914-1 |
| 2 | March 18, 2022 | 978-4-7575-7823-4 | November 14, 2023 | 978-1-9747-4135-9 |
| 3 | July 27, 2022 | 978-4-7575-8047-3 | March 12, 2024 | 978-1-9747-4144-1 |
| 4 | December 27, 2022 | 978-4-7575-8326-9 | July 9, 2024 | 978-1-9747-4146-5 |

==== Episode of Savanaclaw ====
| No. | Original release date | Original ISBN | English release date | English ISBN |
|---|---|---|---|---|
| 1 | July 27, 2023 | 978-4-7575-8705-2 | April 8, 2025 | 978-1-9747-5289-8 |
| 2 | July 26, 2024 | 978-4-7575-9320-6 | October 14, 2025 | 978-1-9747-5856-2 |
| 3 | April 27, 2026 | 978-4-301-00485-1 | — | — |

==== Episode of Octavinelle ====
| No. | Original release date | Original ISBN | English release date | English ISBN |
|---|---|---|---|---|
| 1 | January 26, 2024 | 978-4-7575-9022-9 | July 8, 2025 | 978-1-9747-5583-7 |
| 2 | August 27, 2024 | 978-4-7575-9382-4 | February 10, 2026 | 978-1-9747-5781-7 |
| 3 | October 27, 2025 | 978-4-301-00135-5 | — | — |

==== Episode of Scarabia ====
| No. | Original release date | Original ISBN | English release date | English ISBN |
|---|---|---|---|---|
| 1 | February 27, 2025 | 978-4-7575-9704-4 | March 10, 2026 | 978-1-9747-6181-4 |
| 2 | August 27, 2026 | 978-4-301-00725-8 | — | — |

=== Novel ===
The first novel adaptation, Disney Twisted-Wonderland: Rose-Red Tyrant (ディズニー ツイステッドワンダーランド EPISODE1 真紅の暴君, Disney Twisted-Wonderland Episode 1: Shinku no Bōkun), inspired by Alice in Wonderland and written by Jun Hioki, was released on March 18, 2022. The novel is licensed in English by Viz Media and was released on August 27, 2024.

The second adaptation, Disney Twisted-Wonderland: Usurper from the Wilds (ディズニー ツイステッドワンダーランド EPISODE2 荒野の反逆者, Disney Twisted-Wonderland Episode 2: Kōya no gyaku-sha), inspired by The Lion King and also written by Jun Hioki, was released on August 25, 2023. The novel is licensed in English by Viz Media and was released on January 27, 2026.

=== Anime ===
In October 2021, an anime adaptation was announced. The original net animation (ONA) series, titled Disney Twisted-Wonderland: The Animation, was produced by Yumeta Company and Graphinica and directed by Shin Katagai, with Takahiro Natori serving as chief director and overseeing series scripts, Yoichi Kato writing the scripts, Hanaka Nakano and Akane Satō designing the characters, and Takumi Ozawa returning from the game to compose the music. Consisting of three seasons adapting the first three manga series, the first season, titled Episode of Heartslabyul, was released on Disney+ and Hulu from October 29 to December 17, 2025. The opening theme song is "Piece of My World" performed by Night Ravens, previously featured as the theme song for the game, while the ending theme song is "Obedience" performed by the Heartslabyul Ryōsei (Heartslabyul Dorm Mates).

On November 13, 2025, it was announced that the second season, titled Episode of Savanaclaw, was in production. The season will be released on Disney+ on December 23, 2026.

==== Season 1: Episode of Heartslabyul ====
| No. | Title | Directed by (Note: Production staff information is taken from the ending credits of each episode) | Written by | Original release date |
|---|---|---|---|---|
| 1 | "Stranger Waking"; Transliteration: "Kakusei Sutorenjā!" (Japanese: 覚醒ストレンジャー!) | Shizuku Ishii | Yoichi Katō | October 29, 2025 |
| 2 | "A Dismissive Ranking"; Transliteration: "Reikoku Ansā!" (Japanese: 冷酷アンサー!) | Tomoya Takashima & Shen Qi | Yoichi Katō | November 5, 2025 |
| 3 | "To the Enchanted Mine"; Transliteration: "Fuhon'i Toraberu!" (Japanese: 不本意トラベル!) | Moe Katō | Yōichi Katō | November 12, 2025 |
| 4 | "A Desperate Heart"; Transliteration: "Mayonaka Hangingu!" (Japanese: 真夜中ハンギング!) | Shizuku Ishii | Yuka Yamada | November 19, 2025 |
| 5 | "A Mealtime Chat"; Transliteration: "Ranchi Giruti!" (Japanese: 昼食ギルティ!) | Takushi Shikatani | Yuka Yamada | November 26, 2025 |
| 6 | "An Army of One"; Transliteration: "Tandoku Region!" (Japanese: 単独レギオン!) | Shiho Takahashi | Yōichi Katō | December 3, 2025 |
| 7 | "A Duel Ill-Advised"; Transliteration: "Muteppō Dyueru!" (Japanese: 無鉄砲デュエル!) | Shigeru Kimiya | Yōichi Katō | December 10, 2025 |
| 8 | "Finale for Heartslabyul"; Transliteration: "Shūkyoku Hātsurabyuru!" (Japanese: 終曲ハーツラビュル!) | Moe Katō | Yoichi Katō | December 17, 2025 |

== See also ==
- Psychic Detective Yakumo – a novel series whose second manga adaptation was illustrated by Suzuka Oda
- Pretty Boy Detective Club – a novel series whose manga adaptation was illustrated by Suzuka Oda
