= Rust Blaster =

Japanese manga series

- Cover for the English volume
- Genre: Slice of life; Science fiction
- Manga
- Written by: Yana Toboso
- Published by: Square Enix
- English publisher: NA: Yen Press
- Magazine: Monthly GFantasy
- Original run: November 2005 – April 2006
- Volumes: 1

Rust Blaster (stylized as RustBlaster) is a Japanese manga series written and illustrated by Yana Toboso. It was serialized in Square Enix's Monthly GFantasy from November 2005 to April 2006 and published in a single volume.

== Publication ==
The series is written and illustrated by Yana Toboso. It was serialized in Monthly GFantasy from the November 2005 issue to the April 2006 issue and published in a single tankōbon volume, which was released on May 27, 2006.

In January 2015, Yen Press announced they licensed the series for English publication. They released the volume on August 18, 2015.

== Reception ==
Jason Thompson of Otaku USA criticized the series, stating it "works best as a so-bad-it's-good comedy". Gregory Smith of The Fandom Post offered a different perspective, recommended the series to new shōnen manga fans. Christel Scheja of Splash Comics also praised the series, stating that while it was not as good as the author's next work, Black Butler, it was still "fun to read".
