= List of Black Butler characters =

The original residents of the Phantomhive manor as they appear in the first volume of the manga. Clockwise from center: Ciel Phantomhive, Finnian, Mey-Rin, Baldroy, Sebastian, and Tanaka.

The manga and anime series Black Butler features an extensive cast of characters created by Yana Toboso. The series takes place in England during the reign of Queen Victoria. It follows Sebastian Michaelis, a demonic butler obliged to serve ten-year-old (later thirteen-year-old) Earl Ciel Phantomhive due to a contract he made with Ciel. Ciel binds Sebastian to his will to exact his revenge upon the people that humiliated and tortured him and killed his family in order to make them suffer the same pain.

== Main characters ==
=== Sebastian Michaelis ===
Voiced by: Toshiyuki Morikawa (first drama CD), Daisuke Ono (anime and second drama CD) (Japanese); J. Michael Tatum (English)
Film adaption: Hiro Mizushima
Musicals: Yuya Matsushita, Yūta Furukawa

Sebastian and Ciel's contract mark

Sebastian Michaelis (セバスチャン・ミカエリス, Sebastian Mikaerisu) is the title character of Black Butler. He is the demon butler of the Phantomhive household and acts as Ciel Phantomhive's bodyguard. Being a butler is a job he is completely devoted to, following Ciel's orders with great loyalty and swiftness. He enjoys challenging Ciel and doesn't seem to be truly concerned about his well-being at times, insulting and irritating him to see his reaction. However, there are times that he displays concern for Ciel's life, such as when he was worried when Ciel had an asthma attack, and again later on when he had a panic attack. Sebastian has a fondness for felines in general, stating he cannot foresee or control his own reactions and feelings when in presence of one. As a demon, he has also shown to be extremely ruthless, sadistic, and manipulative to his opponents and is intrigued with humans' behaviors and attitudes, as he finds them interesting because of their insatiable greed.

He is highly skilled at practically everything and handles every task, no matter how impossible it is, as well as any problem that arises from the errors of the other staff, with ease. Due to the fact he is a demon who is bound by a Faustian contract, he must abide by Ciel's will and his contract mark is located on his left hand, allowing Sebastian to find Ciel wherever he is whenever Ciel's contract mark is exposed. In return, Ciel is able to summon and give orders to Sebastian.

The name "Sebastian" was given to him by Ciel after the contract was formed, and it came from the Phantomhive family's late dog, a black Borzoi. It is unknown what other names Sebastian has used under previous masters or whether he has a 'true name'. His age is stated to be a "secret".

=== Ciel Phantomhive ===
Voiced by: Miyuki Sawashiro (first drama CD), Maaya Sakamoto (anime and second drama CD) (Japanese); Brina Palencia (English)
Musical: Shougo Sakamoto, Yukito Nishii, Taketo Tanaka, Nayuta Fukuzaki, Reo Uchikawa, Eito Konishi

Earl Ciel Phantomhive (シエル・ファントムハイヴ, Shieru Fantomuhaivu) is the main protagonist and the business-savvy, egotistical thirteen-year-old head of the Phantomhive family after the deaths of his parents, Vincent and Rachel Phantomhive. He runs the Funtom Company, which manufactures toys and sweets, with the later addition of a food branch after winning a Royal Warrant. His right eye, which is usually covered with a black eye patch, bears a pentagram, the sign of the Faustian contract he made with the demon Sebastian. Like the previous earls in his family, Ciel is currently known as the Queen's Guard Dog, tasked with eliminating criminals and solving cases in the underworld for Queen Victoria.

After his parents' deaths and prior to meeting Sebastian, he was enslaved by a cult and scheduled to be a ritual sacrifice. During a sacrificial session, Ciel's torturers sacrificed his twin, causing Sebastian to be summoned. Ciel made a contract with Sebastian instead of the cult and then commanded the demon to kill all the people in the room. From that day forward, Ciel devoted his life to finding the people responsible for the humiliation and suffering he had to endure. During the time he was captured, a brand was burned into his back, which he does not want anyone to see. It is also heavily implied that Ciel was sexually abused during this period. As a nobleman, Ciel presents himself as a proud, solemn, and mature boy. Due to his past misfortunes, he rarely smiles and is merciless when dealing with enemies. However, Ciel has occasionally expressed concern for the well-being of the few close to him. Despite his stoic demeanor, Ciel exhibits traits befitting a young man for his age, such as his fondness for sweets and games. As such, Ciel is clever, mischievous, and competitive, doing whatever it takes to win a match. Although physically weak, Ciel is proficient with the use of guns, and always carries one in order to protect himself. His name means "sky" in French.

During the Blue Cult Arc, Ciel is revealed to have an older twin brother, the real Lord Ciel Phantomhive, who died before the events of the manga. Having assumed his brother's identity and title, his real name is currently unknown.

== Supporting characters ==
=== Phantomhive household ===
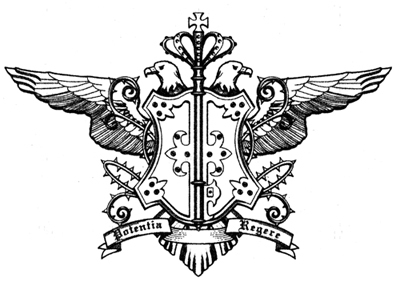
Phantomhive coat of arms

The Phantomhive manor belongs to the Phantomhive family and is located outside the city of London. The Phantomhive family is a secret executive agency controlled directly by Queen Victoria and is often referred to as the "Aristocrats of Evil" and the "Queen's Watchdogs." They are tasked with eliminating anything that worries the Queen by any means necessary. They are able to control and manage the underworld of the United Kingdom to avoid any information of its existence from reaching the general public. As such, the Phantomhive family's position as the Queen's Watchdogs is only known by selected individuals in polite society. The current head of the family is Ciel Phantomhive, son of Earl Vincent and Countess Rachel Phantomhive, who were murdered and their original estate burned (the manor in which Ciel currently resides with his servants is an exact replica of the original manor). In addition to the services that they provide for the Queen, the Phantomhive family runs a famous toy and confectionery corporation called the Funtom Company.

The estate currently has five servants, but their positions as servants are a front for their real jobs of protecting the Phantomhive estate as well as protecting Ciel, to whom they are deeply devoted. Baldroy serves as the cook, Finnian is the gardener, and Mey-Rin is the maid. The three were personally chosen and trained by Sebastian for their duties. Tanaka has served under Earl Vincent and Lady Rachel as their butler, but has not been seen doing any work during his service under Ciel, in which his job is the house steward. Sebastian Michaelis, a demon, acts as the butler after Tanaka. Snake is the newest addition, and acts as the footman. Lady Rachel and Earl Phantomhive each have one sister; both married and became a part of other noble families before the start of the series. Rachel's sister, Angelina Dalles (nicknamed as Madam Red), married into the Burnett family. She committed the Jack the Ripper's murders and was killed by her accomplice, Grell Sutcliff, after her exposure. Vincent's sister, Marchioness Francis Midford, married Marquess Midford, and Elliott Ray, Death incarnate, who is engaged to Ciel Phantomhive.

Baldroy (バルドロイ, Barudoroi)
Voiced by: Rikiya Koyama (drama CD), Hiroki Tōchi (anime) (Japanese); Ian Sinclair (English)

Baldroy (also spelled as Bardroy), usually referred to as Baldo or Bard, is the household cook of American descent. He rarely produces anything edible as he uses weaponry such as flamethrowers to cook, believing that cooking is an art requiring explosions. Sebastian believes anything he creates is made up of charcoal and carcinogens. Baldroy pursues cooking to learn how to slow down, as he states cooking takes patience to master, which was something he was not used to during his years in the military. When he was a soldier, his entire platoon was wiped out, leaving him as the only survivor. Sebastian discovered Baldroy on the battlefield after his comrades had fallen and offered him employment. While terrible at cooking, he is shown to be capable of taking advantage of his surroundings, such as using fine flour to create an explosion. Due to his experience as a soldier, he takes command over the servants when Ciel and Sebastian are away from the manor. Like Finnian and Mey-Rin, he provides much of the comic relief in the series.

Finnian (フィニアン, Finian)
Voiced by: Motoki Takagi (drama CD), Yūki Kaji (anime) (Japanese); Jason Liebrecht (English)

Finnian, usually referred to as Finny, is the household gardener of German descent. However, it seems every time he tends to the garden, it is destroyed through an accident caused by his clumsiness. He is portrayed as an innocent, optimistic character who loves his work, but is dubbed an idiot by Sebastian for destroying everything he touches in spite of being warned to take caution beforehand. Finnian displays feats of superhuman strength, which he tries to suppress for fear of hurting others and risk of sabotaging his work. The sequence, S-012, is tattooed on the nape of his neck and is usually covered by his straw hat, which was given to him by Ciel. In addition, Ciel bestowed Finny's name by naming him after Fionn mac Cumhaill from the Fenian Cycle when he came into his employment. He works as a gardener to spend as much time as possible outside, because prior for working for Ciel, he was an experiment subject that was kept locked up and forced to kill his friends. Like Baldroy and Mey-Rin, he provides much of the comic relief in the series.

Mey-Rin (メイリン, Meirin)
Voiced by: Fumiko Orikasa (drama CD), Emiri Katō (anime) (Japanese); Monica Rial (English)

Mey-Rin is the household maid of Chinese descent. Mey-Rin has extreme binocular acuity and was given a pair of round glasses by Ciel, which she cherishes and refuses to give up. Mey-Rin's eyesight prevent her from viewing objects correctly at close-range, which causes her to be clumsy when doing her chores; however, Sebastian believes her main problem is her intelligence and not her eyesight. She has a crush on Sebastian as she blushes whenever she is in his presence and is even clumsier when Sebastian is watching. She is rather superstitious, but admits to having a soft spot for scary stories. Mey-Rin is a professional sniper and due to her sharp binocular vision, she does not require a scope to aid her. She is also physically fit as she can use a sniper rifle like a handgun and keeps hundreds loaded at once to decrease reload time. She speaks in a high-tone whiny voice except when she is using her sniper rifles she speaks in a deep stern voice. Like Baldroy and Finnian, she provides much of the comic relief.

Tanaka (タナカ)
Voiced by: Makoto "Mugihito" Terada (Drama CD, Anime series from 2024 onwards), Shunji Fujimura (Anime Season 1~Book of Circus) (Japanese); R. Bruce Elliott (English)

Tanaka is the house steward of Japanese descent. He was present when Ciel's parents were killed and was stabbed in the back trying to protect Ciel. As a result, he rarely talks or does any work, but is always seen participating in the other servants' antics. Sebastian seems to respect him the most out of all the staff. He is usually seen drinking from a Japanese tea cup and commonly seen in a super deformed form. Despite his appearance, Tanaka is capable of killing intruders effortlessly. Prior to Sebastian's appointment as Ciel's butler, Tanaka served as the head butler of the Phantomhive household for Ciel's father. He is very loyal and kind to Ciel, and is strict when it comes to his duties. Unlike the other servants, Tanaka is perceptive in Sebastian's actions, as well for the reasons behind them. When Sebastian is apparently 'murdered', Ciel appoints Tanaka as the head butler again, a position he fulfills nearly as well as Sebastian. As the series progresses, he is seen less often in a super deformed form. During the Emerald Witch Arc, Tanaka showed skill in slicing bullets fired at him with a sword, silently closing in his target; however, he admits that at his age, he cannot keep up such strenuous activity for long.

Snake (スネーク, Sunēku)
Voiced by: Takuma Terashima (Japanese); Spike Spencer (English)

Snake was the latest first-string member to the Noah's Ark Circus and he was its snake/human hybrid. He is always seen with at least one snake draped around his shoulders and has distinct snake skin patterns covering various patches all over his body. His sentences always end with a name of one of his many snakes, indicating he is uncomfortable when communicating with others unless through his pets. Additionally, Snake will use a distinct accent and tone depending on which snake he is speaking for, reflecting the character Snake associates with it. Snake was taken in as a family member after the first-string members when they freed him from a traveling freak show. He had vowed to avenge his dead comrades after Ciel and Sebastian had disposed of them all, leaving him alone again. Snake tracked down the Phantomhive manor using the clothes Ciel left behind and a little unexpected help from Prince Soma. After the murder cases within the mansion were solved, Snake was revealed as the thirteenth guest caught by Sebastian while hiding on the mansion grounds in an attempt to take Ciel's life. Instead of killing him, Ciel welcomes him as an addition to his servants, making him the footman of the Phantomhive household. He still refers to Ciel and Sebastian as Smile and Black (their stage names when infiltrating the Noah's Ark Circus), respectively. His snakes all take names after famous Victorian writers and poets: Wordsworth, Emily, Goethe, Oscar, Wilde, Webster, Brontë, Donne, and Keats.

== Former Phantomhive members ==
=== Earl Vincent Phantomhive ===
Voiced by: Kazuyuki Okitsu (Japanese); Robert McCollum (English)

Earl Vincent Phantomhive (ヴィンセント・ファントムハイヴ, Vinsento Fantomuhaivu) was the late Earl Phantomhive, the husband of Rachel Dalles and the late father of Ciel. Vincent was once the Prefect of Sapphire Owl Dorm at Weston College. According to Tanaka, Vincent would never lose his composure, even if one of his servants died, and Diedrich notes Ciel has also started to display some of Vincent's more disagreeable traits. He also bears a striking resemblance to Sebastian Michaelis.

=== Countess Rachel Dalles-Phantomhive ===
Voiced by: Kane Uetake (Japanese); Brina Palencia (English)

Countess Rachel Dalles-Phantomhive (レイチェル・ファントムハイヴ, Reicheru Fantomuhaivu) was the wife of Vincent and the late mother of Ciel, who he greatly resembles. According to her younger sister Angelina Dalles, Rachel was a beautiful, kind and cheerful woman, despite her poor health. Ciel inherited her asthma.

=== Lord Ciel Phantomhive ===
Voiced by: Miyuki Sawashiro (Japanese); Brina Palencia (English)

Lord Ciel is the real Ciel Phantomhive and the older twin brother of the protagonist Ciel Phantomhive. He died before the events of the manga as part of the ritual to summon a demon, but was revived by Undertaker and kept hidden until the Blue Cult Arc. After Lord Ciel retakes his position as head of the Phantomhive family, he accuses his brother of usurping his position and blames him for his and the Undertaker's own crimes, turning Ciel, Sebastian and the rest of their group into wanted fugitives.

== Nobles ==
Madam Red (マダム・レッド, Madamu Reddo)
Voiced by: Masako Katsuki (drama CD), Romi Park (anime) (Japanese); Lydia Mackay (English)

Angelina Dalles (アンジェリーナ･ダレス, Anjerīna Daresu), also known as Madam Red, was Ciel's aunt. As her title suggests, Angelina was known for her red appearance and clothing. Initially, she hated her red hair, which she inherited from her father, until Vincent Phantomhive said he liked it. Angelina fell in love with Vincent, but became distraught when she found out her sister was marrying him. Madam Red later married Baron Burnett, who treated her lovingly and gently, stating that he does not mind that she harbors feelings for another. She obtained a medical license against her parents' wishes and practiced at the Royal London Hospital. After a carriage accident in which her husband was killed, her womb and unborn child had to be removed. This caused her great strife as a doctor because she regularly performed abortions on prostitutes since they believed having a child was troublesome. Unable to bear her misery at ending so many pregnancies when she herself wanted one so badly, she began to kill her patients with Grell Sutcliff and the two become known as Jack the Ripper. However, she was unable to kill Ciel because she sees him as her own son, causing Grell to turn on her and kill her.

Lau (劉, Rau; pinyin: Liú) and Ran-Mao (藍猫, Ranmao; pinyin: Lán-Māo, lit. "blue cat")
Voiced by: Koji Yusa, Sayuri Yahagi (Japanese); Jerry Jewell, Trina Nishimura (English)

Lau is a Chinese nobleman, the president of the British Branch of a Chinese trading company known as Kong-Rong, and friend to the Phantomhive family. He is the head of the Shanghai Mafia Qing Bang (Green Gang in Chinese) and runs an opium den. He is always smiling and his eyes are always closed except for brief moments. Lau often agrees to do things before learning what is happening and jumps into conversations with helpful information only to later state he was clueless on the topic. Although he acts carefree, comical, and easy-going, he can be very coldblooded and cryptic, willing to go further than Ciel would, such as having Harold West and his wife Mina killed because they cheated in a curry competition. He is always seen with his personal assassin, Ran-Mao, a Chinese, doll-like girl referred to as his sister, although not by blood. Although she very rarely speaks and is portrayed as emotionless, she is very loyal to him.

Soma Asman Kadar (ソーマ・アスマン・カダール, Sōma Asuman Kadāru)
Voiced by: Shinnosuke Tachibana (Japanese); Christopher Ayres (Season 1 – Season 3), Abi Kumar (Season 4 onwards) (English)

Soma is a seventeen-year-old Indian prince, and the twenty-sixth child of the Raja of Bengal. Unlike Ciel, he is spoiled and uses his parents' fortune for his personal needs and blames all of his problems on others. During the course of his time in England, Soma begins to mature, although he still possesses childish traits. After learning that his servant Mina hated him for his ignorance and self-absorbed personality, Soma decided to stay with Ciel and learn how to act as a gentleman and even proclaims to be Ciel's best friend. Shortly after, Ciel has him and Agni manage his townhouse in London, but they occasionally return to the Phantomhive manor for visits. Soma is constantly worrying about Ciel and becomes very pleased whenever he can be of assistance to him. Soma is frequently frightened by Sebastian, as he hides behind others whenever he is speaking to him.

Agni (アグニ, Aguni)
Voiced by: Hiroki Yasumoto (Japanese); Patrick Seitz (Season 1 – Season 3), Gopal Bala (Season 4 onwards) (English)

Agni was the servant of Prince Soma, whom he saw and worshiped as a god. Agni was once a nobleman named Arshad born as a Brahmin, the highest caste, among the caste hierarchy of Hinduism, by virtue of which he was considered holy, and allowed to serve the divine. Agni (Arshad) used his powers and wealth for his own desires to the point that he was to be hanged for his crimes. Before he was executed, Prince Soma offered him a new life and name, shedding his former self. He was able to fight on a par with Sebastian while using a fencing foil, a feat which briefly makes Ciel wonder if he is a Grim Reaper until Sebastian confirms he was a human. The source of his prowess came from his devotion to Soma, and Agni cared for him deeply. Unlike Sebastian, he was able to see the good in the Phantomhive manor staff and assigned them tasks where their skills will be of use. He considered Sebastian his friend, something that surprises Sebastian as no one has ever called him that before, though this did not stop him from ignoring Sebastian's attempts to prevent him from turning himself in for his crimes. Sebastian also held Agni in high regards, although Agni displayed modesty when complimented on his capabilities. He resided with Soma at Ciel's townhouse and managed it. Agni was later killed while defending Soma from an unknown assailant.

Elizabeth Midford (エリザベス・ミッドフォード, Erizabesu Middofōdo)
Voiced by: Yukari Tamura (Japanese); Cherami Leigh (English)
Musical: Momoko Okazaki

Elizabeth Midford is the daughter of Francis and Alexis Leon Midford, Edward's younger sister, and Ciel's fiancée. Elizabeth is often called "Lizzie" for short. Elizabeth is extremely girly, energetic, and is deeply devoted to Ciel, who she loves with all her heart and wishes to see him smile again. She tries to only look cute in front of Ciel because of a comment that he didn't like her as a strong girl who could fight. While it looks as though she can not hold her own in combat, it was revealed later that she is a fencing prodigy when she was about to be killed by Bizarre Dolls, and that she had concealed her abilities for Ciel's sake.

In the anime, her full name is "Elizabeth Ethel Cordelia Midford."

Francis Midford (フランシス・ミッドフォード, Furanshisu Middofōdo)
Voiced by: Atsuko Tanaka (Japanese); Elizabeth Maxwell (English)

Born Francis Phantomhive, she is Ciel's aunt and Vincent's younger sister. She is married to Alexis Leon Midford and is Elizabeth and Edward's mother. Although she is strict, critical, and sometimes intimidating to Ciel (and Sebastian, who even fears her and is impressed by her capabilities), she cares deeply for Ciel and her family. Francis is against males having long bangs, so she usually forces Ciel and Sebastian (and later Snake) to adopt a straight-back hairstyle. Like the rest of the Midford family, she is an expert swordswoman.

Alexis Leon Midford (アレクシス・レオン・ミッドフォード, Arekushisu Reon Middofōdo)
Voiced by: Jouji Nakata (Japanese); Jeremy Schwartz (English)

Marquess Alexis Leon Midford is the leader of the British Knights and is Ciel's uncle-by-marriage, as well as Elizabeth and Edward's father. Unlike his wife, he is light-hearted and slightly oblivious, although he puts on a facade of a calm, silent and stern individual. He once attended to Weston College with Vincent and Diedrich, where he was the fag for the latter. As head of the British Knights and like the rest of the Midford family, he is an expert swordsman.

Chlaus (クラウス, Kurausu)
Voiced by: Daishirō Hano (Japanese); Christopher Sabat (English)

Chlaus is a nobleman and an old friend of Vincent. Although he lives in Italy, Chlaus enjoys traveling a lot and visits London occasionally whenever he is called on. As part of the Phantomhive family's network of informants in the underworld, he works closely with Ciel, who he has known since the latter's childhood. As such, Ciel looks up to him as an uncle and is kind and polite to him. In return, Chlaus is very light-hearted and cordial in Ciel's presence, and he is always willing to do favors for him.

Diedrich (ディーデリヒ, Dīdorihhi)
Voiced by: Kenji Takahashi (season 1), Kenji Hamada (Japanese); Mark Stoddard (season 1), Anthony Bowling, Aaron Campbell (teenager, season 4) (English)

Diedrich is a German noble and a childhood friend of Vincent since their schooldays at Weston College, where he was made Vincent's permanent fag after losing a bet to him, therefore establishing their lifelong affiliation to each other. After Vincent's death, he continues to be part of the Phantomhive family's network of informants in the underworld. Even since his schooldays, Diedrich has always been a strict, dignified, and honorable man. However, he has also shown to be short-tempered when provoked, easily irritable, and impatient. He seems to have a gained a substantial amount of weight since Vincent's death. He comes to Ciel's aid when Ciel is sent to Germany by Queen Victoria to investigate a series of strange deaths.

== Grim Reapers ==
The Grim Reapers are spirits tasked to retrieve the souls of the dead. All Grim Reapers are humans who committed suicide, forced to work until having fully repented for the sin of taking their own lives. They have a rivalry with Demons, who collect souls for their nourishment and are always at odds with them. Each Grim Reaper carries an instrument that can be used as a weapon called a "Death Scythe", which is indestructible and can only be countered by another Death Scythe.

Grell Sutcliff (グレル・サトクリフ, Gureru Satokurifu)
Voiced by: Jun Fukuyama (Japanese); Daniel Fredrick (English)

A sadistic, flamboyant Grim Reaper who initially posed as Angelina Dalles' butler and conspired with her as Jack the Ripper. Grell is reprimanded after being exposed and later returns to her job. She is infatuated with Sebastian and always tries to approach him. Grell's Death Scythe is modeled after a chainsaw.

Ronald Knox (ロナルド・ノックス, Ronarudo Nokkusu)
Voiced by: KENN (Japanese); Joel McDonald (English)

A carefree and sociable Grim Reaper who occasionally works with William and Grell. His Death Scythe is modeled after a lawnmower.

William T. Spears (ウィリアム・T・スピアーズ, Wiriamu T. Supiāzu)
Voiced by: Noriaki Sugiyama (Japanese); Barry Yandell (English)

William is a no-nonsense, dignified Grim Reaper who is Grell and Ronald's superior, always reprimanding them for their mistakes. His Death Scythe is modeled after an extendable pruner.

Undertaker (アンダーテイカー, Andāteikā)
Voiced by: Junichi Suwabe (Japanese); John Swasey (English)

Undertaker is a seceded Grim Reaper. He is also a former Aristocrat of Evil and informant to the Phantomhive house since Vincent Phantomhive's time. He used to work as a funeral director for normal society. Undertaker's Death Scythe is a large, ornate, customized scythe featuring a skeletal design with thorns.

== Noah's Ark Circus ==
Kelvin (ケルヴィン, Keruvin)
Voiced by: Chafurin (Japanese); Mike McFarland (English)

Baron Kelvin was the creator of the Noah's Ark Circus and was referred to as "Father" by the first-string performers. Except for his left eye, his entire face was covered by bandages after hiring the Doctor to perform surgery as a way to make himself more appealing to Ciel, only to believe it was all a waste when he heard the Phantomhive's had been murdered. He seemed to have an obsession with children and used his circus as a way to kidnap them. He then brainwashed them and had them act as his servants and as performers for his private circus. However, he did not care for their well-being and even found it entertaining when they die gruesomely while performing dangerous stunts in the show without any training. Originally, he had been a kind philanthropist, but became infatuated with Ciel after meeting him and was involved somehow with the mysterious organization that captured Ciel after his parents' deaths. Kelvin also funded the Doctor's prosthetic limb research and upon discovering that Ciel was still alive, recreated the room where the organization caged and tortured Ciel before trying to sacrifice him in a cruel ritual. After learning this, Ciel killed him and ordered Sebastian to burn his mansion.

Joker (ジョーカー, Jōkā)
Voiced by: Mamoru Miyano (Japanese); Matthew Mercer (English)

Joker was the ring leader of the Noah's Ark Circus when it is traveling and served Baron Kelvin as a butler when he is at the manor. He was recognized by his prosthetic skeleton arm and was initially portrayed as a very goofy person. However, he was strict and serious when it comes to his duties. Although he did not agree with some of Baron Kelvin's decisions, he followed every order given to him because he wanted to protect his "brothers and sisters" in the workhouse, whom Kelvin claimed he looks after if they all do what they are told. Joker was unaware of the fact that the bones of the kidnapped children are used by Doctor as material for the prosthetic limbs, nor did he know that the workhouse never existed. He, like every first-string performer, referred to Baron Kelvin as "Father", because Baron Kelvin took him off the streets of the East End as a child and raised him in addition to providing artificial limbs. He died from extensive hemorrhaging, Sebastian having severed his other arm, as he attempted to defend Baron Kelvin from Ciel.

Doctor (先生, Sensei)
Voiced by: Satoshi Mikami (Japanese); Alex Organ (English)

Doctor was the kind, wheelchair-using doctor who cared for the performers of the circus. However, this was later revealed to be a ruse as he really can walk and is quite sadistic. He hand-carved the prosthetic limbs used by some of the first-string performers from an unknown strong material that he is developing through his research, funded by Baron Kelvin. This material is later revealed to be a special bone china made from the bones of the kidnapped children. He had Kelvin use his power and money to provide him with the resources he needs to perfect his craft and has him kidnap children that he uses. He was killed by Sebastian under Ciel's orders.

Beast (ビースト, Bīsuto)
Voiced by: Yūko Kaida (Japanese); Tia Ballard (English)

Beast was one of the first-string members of Noah's Ark Circus and its animal trainer. Beast grew up alongside the other first-string members in the East End until Baron Kelvin found them and picked them off the streets. Beast is missing her right leg, which was replaced by prosthetic limb. However, her dedication to Kelvin isn't as deep as Joker's was, and she was willing to leave him behind to live a life with Joker, who she loved, although it was unrequited. On one of the nights that Sebastian had sneaked out, he seduced Beast to use her as a last resort on obtaining the information on Kelvin. She was later killed by Baldroy when she and the other first-string members of the circus (except for Doll and Snake) invaded the Phantomhive manor to kidnap Ciel (unaware that he wasn't there at the time).

Dagger (ダガー, Dagā)
Voiced by: Nobuhiko Okamoto (Japanese); Michael Sinterniklaas (English)

Dagger was the Noah's Ark Circus knife thrower. Dagger was missing his right leg, and has an artificial one made by Doctor that he wore instead. Dagger was a flamboyant, dramatic, energetic boy who was nearly constantly smiling. He seemed to have a great love, bordering on obsession, for Beast, whom he always referred to as "Sis" or "Big Sis", and was always willing to express his feelings for her, frequently serenading her or offering her gifts. He continued these acts, even when Beast was not around and despite no indication of interest from her. Like the other first-string members, he lived in an alley in the East End. He had been missing his right leg since birth, a commonality that linked him with the others. One day, Baron Kelvin found them in the alley, and invited them to come live at his mansion. After some time there, they decided to start a circus, and Joker gave him the stage name Dagger, which he didn't initially appear to be very excited about. He was later killed by Baldroy when he and the other first-string members of the circus (except for Doll and Snake) invaded the Phantomhive manor to kidnap Ciel (unaware that he wasn't there at the time).

Peter (ピーター, Pītā)
Voiced by: Yūki Tai (Japanese); Vic Mignogna (English)

Peter worked with Wendy as a trapeze artist in the Noah's Ark Circus. He cared deeply about Wendy, as he was shown to be always by her side. Peter was prone to violence, angers easily and frequently makes rude, sarcastic remarks. Despite his tendency to anger easily, he shown to intelligent, such as when he abandoned attacking Finnian to take out a more serious threat. Like Wendy, Peter's growth was stunted, forcing them to be trapped in children's bodies. Peter grew up with the other first-string members in an alley in the East End. After some time, they decided to start a circus, and Wendy and Peter formed the trapeze act. He was later killed by Mey-Rin when he and the other first-string members of the circus (except for Doll and Snake) invaded the Phantomhive manor to kidnap Ciel (unaware that he wasn't there at the time).

Wendy (ウエンディ, Uendi)
Voiced by: Mayumi Shintani (Japanese); Rachel Robinson (English)

Wendy worked with Peter as a trapeze artist in the Noah's Ark Circus. She initially seemed soft-spoken, and usually deferred to Peter to do most of the talking. However, when she did speak, she presented herself in a mature manner, such as when she comforted Beast. She cared deeply about the other first-string circus members, perhaps more than she cared about Baron Kelvin, and seems to be most attached to Peter, as she is almost always in his presence. Wendy grew up in an alley in the East End with the other first-string circus members and were picked up by Baron Kelvin to live at his manor. Like Peter, Wendy's growth was stunted, forcing them to be trapped in a children's bodies. After some time, they decided to start a circus, and Wendy and Peter formed the trapeze act. She was later killed by Mey-Rin when she and the other first-string members of the circus (except for Doll and Snake) invaded the Phantomhive manor to kidnap Ciel (unaware that he wasn't there at the time).

Jumbo (ジャンボ, Janbo)
Voiced by: Ryokan Koyanagi (Japanese); Christopher Sabat (English)

Jumbo was the Noah's Ark Circus fire eater. Jumbo, as name indicated, was an extremely large man, who seems to have a slight hunch. Jumbo seemed to be the voice of reason among the circus members, as he was very level-headed and is not prone to giving into his emotions. Nonetheless, he was extremely kind and generous, once stopping his work to help Dagger play with the other children in the past. Even though he was willing to kill people in order to carry out his orders, he seemed to be genuinely unhappy about having to do so. It is stated that his problem was his abnormal growth. Like the other first-string members, he was picked up by Baron Kelvin and came to live in his manor. When they decided to start a circus, he became the fire eater. He was later killed by Finnian when he and the other first-string members of the circus (except for Doll and Snake) invaded the Phantomhive manor to kidnap Ciel (unaware that he wasn't there at the time).

Doll (ドール, Dōru)
Voiced by: Ayahi Takagaki (Japanese); Mikaela Krantz (English)

Doll was a first-string member of the Noah's Ark Circus, and held the position of tightrope walker. When she wasn't performing, she pretended to be a new, male, second string member named Freckles (そばかす, Sobakasu), because she slept better when she is sharing a room with someone else, something the first-string performers do not have to do. Doll was friendly and welcoming, making conversation with Ciel after they were named tent mates. She was a bit naive, though, easily believing Ciel's lies, something that the other circus performers have reprimanded her for. She was exceedingly loyal to the other first-string members and viewed all of them as family. It is said that the reason for the loss of her left eye is because her parents raised her too harshly and deformed her. One day, Baron Kelvin found them in the alley and allowed them to come live at his estate. Sometime thereafter, they decided to create a circus and Joker gave them all stage names, including Doll, who initially tried to refuse the name. She was turned into a Bizarre Doll and stationed at the F.O.L orphanage.

== London Residents ==
Azzurro Vanel (アズーロ バネル, Azūro Baneru)
Voiced by: Kousuke Toriumi (Japanese); Brian Mathis (English)

Azzurro Vanel was an Italian Mafia drug trafficker of the Ferro family, which operates under the guise of the trading company known as Ferro Company. In order to confirm that Azzurro was the drug dealer Ciel was searching for, he invited the former to his manor for a game of pool along with several others. During the engagement, Ciel stated that he had obtained drugs that Chlaus has procured for him in Italy, prompting Azzurro to kidnap Ciel later that day. Sebastian was able to discover Azzurro's mansion and effortlessly made his way to rescue Ciel through Azzurro's guards. After Azzurro frantically attempted to persuade Sebastian to come work for him, he was then killed by the latter.

Aleister Chamber (アレイスト・チェンバー, Areisuto Chenbā)
Voiced by: Tatsuhisa Suzuki (Japanese); Todd Haberkorn (English)

As the Viscount of Druitt (ドルイット子爵, Doruitto Shishaku), Aleister Chamber is a noble who is known for his taste in fine art, wine and food and his popularity with women. However, he is involved with many secret and occult societies and illegal business, such as human trafficking. He once attended Weston College in the Scarlet Fox Dorm. Although he does not engage in any medical profession, he has a doctor's license. Since Edgar Redmond is his nephew, it is implied that Aleister has at least one sibling. He often appears as comic relief.

Paula (ポーラ, Pōra)
Voiced by: Yui Itsuki (Japanese); Jessica Cavanagh (English)

Paula is Elizabeth's maid who accompanies her wherever she goes. Elizabeth and Paula have a close relationship, as Paula gives her advice and cares for her. After a snow festival in the anime, Paula became obsessed with jingling bells throughout the rest of the series.

Nina Hopkins (ニナ・ホプキンス, Nina Hopukinsu)

Nina Hopkins is a tailor who designs clothes for Ciel, Elizabeth, and Ciel's servants. Although she does not care for Ciel's male servants, she is extremely fond of Mey-Rin (much to her dismay). Despite her dramatic and noisy personality, she is skilled in her profession and has a radical perspective on fashion.

Arthur Randall (アーサー・ランドル, Āsā Randoru)
Voiced by: Yutaka Aoyama (Japanese); John Gremillion (English)

Arthur Randall is the police commissioner of the Scotland Yard. As the leader of the Scotland Yard, he is aware of Ciel's role as the Queen's Watchdog and despises whenever his cases are taken over by him. Although he is loyal to the Queen and trusts her decisions, he loathes Ciel as he sees him as nothing more than a brat and considers the Phamtomhive family to be iniquitous when dealing with cases.

Fred Abberline (フレッド・アバーライン, Fureddo Abārain)
Voiced by: Hisayoshi Suganuma (Japanese); Jonathan Brooks (English)

Fred Abberline (named after the real Frederick Abberline) is the chief inspector of Scotland Yard. He works under Arthur Randall, and is the only officer in Scotland Yard besides the commissioner that is aware of Ciel's identity as the Queen's Watchdog. He is a curious, righteous, and somewhat meek individual. While he may not despise Ciel as Randall does, he is appalled by the fact that Queen Victoria and Ciel have an arrangement that allows Ciel to solve cases in a dishonorable manner, noting that it is the opposite how Scotland Yard operates. In the anime adaption, he is portrayed differently (in both appearance and personality) and as one who truly believes in the justice system. He wishes to make London a place where it is safe to have a family and plans to marry his pregnant fiancée. Like Ciel, he had to go through hard times to reach his current situation. Despite this, Ciel describes him as someone who walks in the light, whereas Ciel walks in the darkness. At first, Abberline didn't trust Ciel and his position as the Queen's Watchdog, but later joins him as an ally. He is killed by Lau by using his body as a human shield to protect Ciel.

Harold West Jeb (ハロルド・ウエストジェブ, Harorudo Uesuto Jebu)
Voiced by: Yoshimitsu Shimoyama (Japanese); Newton Pittman (English)

Harold West Jeb, commonly known as simply Harold West, was a well-known businessman who dealt with trading spices and tea leaves in India, and he was Mina's husband. He owned a general store named "Harold Trading" and a Hindustani coffeehouse called "Harold West". Ciel met him at a party during London's Season, an exchange that the former found unpleasant. West was an arrogant, conniving, and unethical man, and Ciel described him as someone who was "disgustingly obsessed with status". In an attempt to win at a curry competition to obtain a Royal Warrant, West recruited Agni to be his chef and in return, he and Mina will prevent Soma from learning the truth about Mina's relationship with West, because Soma assumed that West kidnapped her, when she willingly went with him to London to escape her low social status. After losing the curry competition to Ciel's Funtom Company, West and Mina were then presumably killed by Ran-Mao under Lau's orders.

Mina (ミーナ, Mīna)
Voiced by: Yūko Gotō (Japanese); Emily Gray (English)

Mina was Harold West Jeb's wife and previously Soma's servant who he had known since childhood. Soma adored her like an older sister, describing her as a beautiful, cheerful, and kind woman. However, Mina secretly hated Soma, as she saw him nothing more than a selfish brat, and desired to escape her life as a servant. When West came to India, Mina married him and went back with him to London. When Soma and Agni followed (under the impression that she was kidnapped), West and Mina set up an agreement with Agni in exchange for "putting on an act" in front of Soma to prevent from learning the truth of her relationship with West. Mina appeared at the curry fair being held at the Crystal Palace after West lost the Royal Warrant to Ciel's Funtom Company, where she revealed her self-centered personality and hatred to Soma. In spite of this, Soma understood her reasons, and genuinely apologized and thanked her for everything she had done for him. Afterwards, Mina and West were then presumably killed by Ran-Mao under Lau's orders.

Arthur Conan Doyle (アーサー·コナン·ドイル, Āsā· Konan· Doiru)
Voiced by: Shintarō Asanuma (Japanese); Taliesin Jaffe (English)

Arthur is an oculist and aspiring author. He is one of ten children and a very observant and righteous individual. Being a fan of his stories, Ciel invites him to attend a banquet being held at his manor for Georg von Siemens, where he becomes a prominent figure in assisting with solving the murders that took place there. After the truth of the events were revealed by Ciel and Sebastian, Sebastian threatens him to keep the true murderer's identity (Charles Grey), Ciel's status as the Queen's Watchdog, and Sebastian's true demonic nature in secrecy.

Georg von Siemens (ゲオルクフォンジーメンス, Georuku fon Jīmensu)
Voiced by: Masashi Nogawa (Japanese); Tyson Rinehart (English)

Georg von Siemens (based on the real Georg von Siemens) was a German banker and a distant relative of Queen Victoria. He was somewhat of an alcoholic and perverted man, but was a prominent figure in the industrial development for Germany. As a request from the Queen, Ciel agreed to host a banquet in Georg's honor during his visit to London to assess the growth of its businesses. However, in actuality, this was a plot set by the Queen to dispose of him in order to weaken Germany's political power. After pretending to be dead initially as part of a "prank" he and Charles Grey performed at the Phantomhive manor, he was subsequently killed by Grey as per the Queen's command.

Karl Woodley (カールウードレー, Kāru Uudoree)
Voiced by: Tooru Sakurai (Japanese); David Wald (English)

Karl Woodley was the president of diamond-polishing Woodley Company. Beneath his façade of being a genial and boisterous man to the public, he was secretly an arms dealer that sold illegal weapons obtained by his wealth in warring countries and the murderer of Steiger Roze, a president of a company that mines diamonds. Being involved in the underworld in London, he knew of Ciel's position as the Queen's Watchdog. As Ciel was planning to exterminate him for his crimes, he invited Woodley to the banquet he was holding at his manor in order to use Woodley as a scapegoat for the murder of Georg von Siemens. After being arrested by the Double Charles, he was killed by Charles Grey when the latter was in a fit of rage.

Patrick Phelps (パトリックフェルプス, Patorikku Ferupusu)
Voiced by: Takumi Watanabe (Japanese); Brandon McInnis (English)

Patrick Phelps was the son of the distinguished shipbuilding magnate known as the Blue Star Line and a board member of its trading division. Although timid and easily frightened, he was described as a capable businessman. For the banquet Ciel was hosting in the honor of Georg von Siemens, Phelps was invited as guest. After discovering Siemens's "corpse" on the first night at the Phantomhive manor, he was moved into Ciel's bedroom (he was afraid to sleep in his room, which was located next to Siemens's) and was unintentionally murdered by one of Snake's serpents, because Ciel's scent was masked over his. Although Sebastian was able to get to him shortly after being bitten, he ignored Phelps's cries for help and left him to die.

Grimsby Keane (グリムスビーキーン, Gurimusubī Kīn)
Voiced by: Eiichirō Tokumoto (Japanese); Aaron Roberts (English)

Grimsby Keane is a stage director and the former lover of Irene Diaz, who was twelve years older than him. He is passionate about his job as a director, and is famed for the craftsmanship of his productions. He is generally a mild-tempered man and was protective over Irene during their relationship. He was one of the guests at Ciel's banquet for Georg von Siemens. Sometime after leaving the Phantomhive manor once the murders were solved, he and Irene broke off their relationship.

Irene Diaz (アイリーンディアス, Airīn Deiasu)
Voiced by: Mana Miyamoto (Japanese); Jamie Marchi (English)

Irene Diaz is a beautiful and famous opera singer (a reference to Irene Adler, who was also an opera singer in the Arthur Conan Doyle's stories focusing on Sherlock Holmes) and was one of Ciel's guests at his banquet for Georg von Siemens. She is a kind-hearted and well-mannered woman. Previously, she was in a romantic relationship with Grimsby Keane, a man twelve years younger than her. However, she maintains a youthful appearance by drinking a red substance extracted from a red perilla. Sometime after leaving the Phantomhive manor once the murders were solved, Irene and Grimsby broke off their relationship. She is dating (albeit secretly) an actor from a rivaling theater company.

== Royal Family ==
Queen Victoria (ヴィクトリア女王, Vikutoria Joō)
Voiced by: Sayuri Sadaoka (season 1, old), Ayako Kawasumi (season 1, young), Hiromi Seta (Book of Circus onwards, old) (Japanese); Bridgett Dahl (season 1, old), Alexis Tipton (season 1, young), Julie Mayfield (Book of Circus~Emerald Witch Arc, old) (English)

Victoria is the Queen of the United Kingdom and has been described as having great beauty and grace. She is also very fond of Ciel, as she calls him 'dear boy' and says he should visit her more often. After the death of her husband and consort Prince Albert, she does not appear in public often and begins to cry hysterically whenever he is mentioned. She also has a stuffed puppet of Albert, with whom she talks whenever she is troubled and misses him. In the manga, she is seen as an intelligent and cunning woman, although she occasionally makes disturbing comments, like when she says that it would be wonderful if the Undertaker's revived monsters where at their side.

In the anime adaption, she plays a villainous role, as she is the one who ordered the destruction of the Phantomhive family. In addition, she nearly attempted suicide because of the grief until Ash approached her. Ash gave her youth and attached part of her husband's body from her neck to her clavicle area. Because the skin continues to rot, it causes her great pain. When Ash tries to fix the problem, she refuses. She later dies and a look-alike is placed on the throne.

=== Staff ===
John Brown (ジョン・ブラウン, Jon Buraun)
Voiced by: Hiroshi Kamiya (Japanese); Aaron Dismuke (English)

John Brown is Queen Victoria's servant and personal bodyguard. He is a stern, quiet, and impassive individual, and he is deeply loyal to Queen Victoria. He spends most of his time trying to console her hysterical fits of tears when she becomes depressed over her late husband's death.

Double Charles (Wチャールズ, Daburu Chāruzu)

The "Double Charles" are two of the Queen's private secretaries and butlers. They seem to have mysterious jobs pertaining to the Queen's wishes.

Charles Grey (チャールズ・グレイ, Chāruzu Gurei)

Voiced by: Ryōhei Kimura (Japanese); Clifford Chapin (English)

Earl Grey appears as guest at Ciel's private party, where he is later revealed to be the murderer of Georg von Siemens by the order of the Queen. He appears quite carefree and comical on most occasions, however, he is short-tempered and prone to using violence whenever he gets the chance, such as when he uses his sword to slice open the doors in the Phantomhive manor. Possessing a great love of food and a ravenous appetite, he enjoys combat and sees it much like a game. He also seem to possess a dislike to Ciel, referring to him as a "brat". Despite this, he is afraid of ghosts and snakes. He hails from a distinguished line of earls, which was famous enough to have a tea named after them.

Charles Phipps (チャールズ・フィップス, Chāruzu Fippusu)

Voiced by: Tomoaki Maeno (Japanese); Brandon Potter (English)

In contrast to his partner Charles Grey, Phipps is a much more mature, disciplined, and down-to-earth man. He always carries his sword, but he is less inclined to use it. He is strict with his duties to the Queen and dislikes disorder in anything, such as clothes. Unexpectedly, he also carries a sewing kit which he can use at lightning speed, demonstrated when he uses it to fix Finny's hat. He has a pet rooster which he keeps on his shoulder, the result of him losing an Easter egg hunt with Sebastian and Ciel.

== Weston College ==
=== Green Lion Dorm ===
Edward Midford (エドワード・ミッドフォード, Edowādo Middofōdo)
Voiced by: Seiichirō Yamashita. (Japanese); Justin Briner (English)

Edward Midford is the only son of the Midford family, Elizabeth's older brother, and is Ciel's cousin. Edward is extremely overprotective and possessive of Elizabeth, and dislikes the fact that she is engaged to Ciel. Similarly to his mother, he is a dignified, hardworking, and determined individual, as well as honorable and stern. Although he is strict with Ciel, he cares for and respects him. Like the rest of the Midford family, he is an expert swordsman, although he views himself as an ordinary person and not a prodigy like Elizabeth. However, according to Herman Greenhill, Edward is a genius in his own right, as he genuinely respects the skills of others and perseveres to be more like his role models. At Weston College, he was Herman Greenhill's fag and later replaced him as prefect of the Green Lion Dorm after he was expelled for the murder of Derrick Arden, his friends and Vice-Principal Agares.

Herman Greenhill (ハーマン・グリーンヒル, Hāman Gurīnhiru)
Voiced by: Shunsuke Takeuchi (Japanese); Jonah Scott (English)

Prefect of the Green Lion Dorm (翡翠の獅子(グリーン・ライオン)寮, Hisui no Shishi/Gurīn Raion Ryō), Herman Greenhill is a serious young man who excels at sports, particularly cricket. He is respectful and honorable, but far too trusting and short-tempered. Like the other perfects, he values tradition above anything else. He was later expelled from the school for the murder of Derrick Arden, his friends and Vice-Principal Agares.

=== Sapphire Owl Dorm ===
Lawrence Bluewer (ロレンス・ブルーアー, Rorensu Burūā)
Voiced by: Junya Enoki (Japanese); Brandon McInnis (English)
Prefect of the Sapphire Owl Dorm (紺碧の梟(サファイア・オウル)寮, Konpeki no Fukurō/Safaia Ōru Ryō), Lawrence Bluewer is a quiet, polite, intelligent, and studious young man. Like the other prefects, he values tradition above anything else and is always enforcing the rules to students at the school. He respects Ciel, having been inspired to give his all in the tournament after seeing the boy practicing late at night. He is the only son in his family, and has seven sisters. He is later expelled from the school for the murder of Derrick Arden, his friends and Vice-Principal Agares.
Clayton (クレイトン, Kureiton)
Voiced by: Shōya Ishige (Japanese); Christian Taylor (English)
Clayton is a member of the Sapphire Owl Dorm. Although he is condescending and slightly devious, he is dutiful to his fag responsibilities, and grants praise to those who deserves it. He was Bluewer's fag and later replaced him as prefect of the Sapphire Owl Dorm after he got expelled from school for the murder of Derrick Arden, his friends and Vice-Principal Agares.
McMillan (マクラミン, Makuramin)
Voiced by: Haruka Shiraishi (Japanese); Ciarán Strange (English)
McMillan is a kind and friendly first-year student in the Sapphire Owl Dorm and the first person to befriend Ciel. He acts like an informant to Ciel about the school's activities and its students.

=== Scarlet Fox Dorm ===
Edgar Redmond (エドガー・レドモンド, Edogā Redomondo)
Voiced by: Toshiki Watanabe (Japanese); Reagan Murdock (English)
Prefect of the Scarlet Fox Dorm (深紅の狐(スカーレット・フォックス)寮, Shinku no Kitsune/Sukāretto Fokkusu Ryō) and nephew of Aleister Chamber, Edgar Redmond is an amicable and laid-back young man who is skilled in poetry. Although he has a leniency for the rules, he, like the other prefects, values tradition above anything else. Despite being a genial person, he is a horrible judge of character, a flaw that he even acknowledges, as he unable to notice Derrick's and Cole's bullying of other students. He seems to truly care for his dorm-mates, especially for Joanne Harcourt, his fag. He is later expelled from school for the murder of Derrick Arden, his friends and Vice-Principal Agares.
Maurice Cole (モーリス・コール, Mōrisu Kōru)
Voiced by: Shun Horie (Japanese); Landon McDonald (English)
Maurice Cole is the previous fag of Redmond. He is a manipulative, sneaky, and incredibly vain individual that enjoys bullying others. He tricked Ciel, who he saw a rival for Redmond's attention, and received punishment for his bullying and cheating after Ciel was able to find evidence of it. He claimed to also be the most beautiful boy at school, but Ciel and Sebastian revealed that his good looks were the result of makeup.
Joanne Harcourt (ジョアンハーコート, Joan Hākōto)
Voiced by: Shinnosuke Tokudome (Japanese); Marianne Bray (English)
Joanne Harcourt is an effeminate and kind young man who later replaced Maurice Cole as Redmond's fag. He looks up to and respects Redmond, wanting to support him in any way. He is also talented in cricket.
Derrick Arden (デリック・アーデン, Derikku Āden)
Voiced by: Yūsuke Kobayashi (Japanese); Alejandro Saab (English)
Derrick Arden was the son of Queen Victoria's cousin, Duke Clemens, and a fifth-year student at Weston College. Prior to the Weston College Arc, he was Redmond's fag and was praised for being an admirable student and his multiple talents in various subjects, such as poetry, cricket, and crafts. However, it was revealed that he was secretly bullying students and stealing their work for his own in order to live up to the high expectations of his family, and bribed Vice-Principal Agares with alcohol to cover it up. He was truly a selfish, disgraceful, despicable young man and upon discovering his true nature, the prefects murdered him and then set up a contract with Undertaker to resurrect him as a Bizarre Doll, along with four of his friends and Agares. After learning the truth of the incident, Ciel reported his findings to the Queen, who covered the truth behind their deaths to avoid a huge scandal.

=== Violet Wolf Dorm ===
Gregory Violet (グレゴリー・バイオレット, Guregorī Baioretto)
Voiced by: Tatsumaru Tachibana (Japanese), Kieran Flitton (English)
Prefect of Violet Wolf Dorm (紫黒の狼(ヴァイオレット・ウルフ)寮, Shiguro no Ōkami/Vaioretto Urufu Ryō), Gregory Violet is a reserved, gloomy, and highly eccentric young man, as well as an excellent artist. He is very mysterious and shows little interest in anything. He, like the other prefects, values tradition above anything else. He is later expelled from school for the murder of Derrick Arden, his friends and Vice-Principal Agares.
Cheslock (チェスロック, Chesurokku)
Voiced by: Kikunosuke Toya (Japanese); Branden Loera (English)
Cheslock is a competitive, prideful, and snide young man from the Violet Wolf Dorm. Cheslock is a musical genius who can play any instrument instantly, and he looks down on students in the other dormitories. However, he cares for the students in his dorm and is shown to be honorable, claiming that he will repay Edward and the other prefects' fags in some way after they helped put out the fire that Ciel secretly set to his dorm. He was Violet's fag and later replaced him as prefect of the Violet Wolf Dorm after he got expelled from school for the murder of Derrick Arden, his friends and Vice-Principal Agares.

=== Staff ===
Johann Agares (ヨハン・アガレス, Yohan Agaresu)
Voiced by: Show Hayami (Japanese); Andrew Webb (English)
Johann Agares was the former vice-principal of Weston College. He was a stoic and apathetic man who dutifully performs his responsibility as the vice principal; however, it was revealed that he did not care for the school rules and was bribed with alcohol by Derrick Arden to cover up his and his friends' misconducts to other students. After being killed by the prefects Edgar Redmond, Lawrence Bluewer, Herman Greenhill, and Gregory Violet, he was resurrected and turned into a Bizarre Doll by Undertaker, who was acting as the headmaster at the school until his identity was discovered by Ciel and Sebastian. According to Undertaker, Agares was his most advanced Bizarre Doll thus far and was able to easily pass as a living human.

== Residents of Wolfsschlucht ==
Sieglinde Sullivan (ジークリンデ・サリヴァン, Jīkurinde Sariban)
Voiced by: Rie Kugimiya (Japanese) Sarah Wiedenheft (English)

Sieglinde Sullivan is the Emerald Witch and the liege lord of Werewolves' Forest and has formerly managed Wolfsschlucht village. As the daughter of Professor Sullivan, Sieglinde was born a genius, understanding how to read and the synthesis of mustard gas at the age of three. To manipulate her into creating a deadly chemical weapon for the German government, she was physically handicapped by bounding her feet and was tricked to believe she was responsible to save the village from the wolfmen. Because of her isolation in the village, she grows curious of the outside world, and therefore is eager to take in Ciel and company. After discovering that the villagers had lied to her, she escapes Germany with Wolfram and arrives in England to meet the Queen.

Wolfram Gelzer (ウォルフラム・ゲルツァー, Uorufuramu Gerutsuā)
Voiced by: Chikahiro Kobayashi (Japanese); Conner Allison (English)

Wolfram Gelzer, formally Lieutenant Wolfram Gelzer, is Sieglinde Sullivan's butler. Since he was young, he was trained rigorously under the German military, and was picked as the butler for his fighting skills. Initially, Wolfram disliked caring for the young Sieglinde, but later came to care for her, and therefore feels guilty for deceiving her. He often spoils her and becomes angered whenever someone does something to displease her. He would do anything to protect her, such as disobeying orders and killing his fellow soldiers.

Hilde Dickhaut (ヒルデ・ディックオー, Hirude Dikkuō), Anne Drewantz (アン・ドレーはたいです, An Dorēwataidesu) and Grete Hilbert (グレーテ・ヒルベルト, Gurēte Hiruberuto)
Hilde, Voiced by: Akeno Watanabe (Japanese); Alex Moore (English)
Anne, Voiced by: Hana Hishikawa (Japanese); Madeleine Norton (English)
Grete, Voiced by: Riho Sugiyama (Japanese); Jaclyn Thomas (English)

Hilde Dickhaut, Anne Drewanz and Grete Hilbard, formally Major Hilde Dickhaut, First Commando Squad Captain Anne Drewanz and Second Commando Squad Captain Grete Hilbard, were high-ranking soldiers of the German military who took part in the Emerald Witch Education Project. They assumed the roles of Sieglinde Sullivan's caretakers. However, at an emergency, they must kill her at any cost. During the search, they loyally followed those duties. As a result, Anne died from an explosion, Grete was shot and killed by Wolfram, and Hilde was killed by Sebastian.

Professor Sullivan (教授サリバン/プロフェッサー・サリバン, Purofessā Sariban/Kyōju Sariban)
Voiced by: Masako Katsuki (Japanese); Kirsty Johnson (English)

Professor Sullivan, informally called "the village crone", was the founder of the Emerald Witch Education Project, where she had her genius daughter, Sieglinde, become its test subject. She had an obsession to create the ultimate chemical weapon for Germany, and therefore prized her daughter for her intellect. Her face was burned and deformed from an explosion years ago when she and other scientists were researching chemical weapons. She was killed by Sebastian when she attempted to escape with the chemical weapon samples.

== Anime-only characters ==
Pluto (プルートゥ, Purūtu)
Voiced by: Takafumi Yamaguchi (Japanese); Z. Charles Bolton (English)

Pluto was a large demon hound that terrorizes the town of Houndsworth until Sebastian tamed him and brought him to the Phantomhive estate. He was able to breathe fire, he walked through barriers and shape-shifted into a human. As a human, he retained his dog-like behavior. Although Sebastian hates dogs, Pluto took a liking to him and only listened to Sebastian's orders. When Ash used him to set fire to the estate and burn London, Ciel ordered his staff to kill Pluto.

Angela Blanc (アンジェラ・ブラン, Anjera Buran) / Ash Landers (アッシュ・ランダース, Asshu Randāsu)
Voiced by: Akiko Yajima, Satoshi Hino (Japanese); Colleen Clinkenbeard, Chuck Huber (English)

Angela/Ash was a bigender angel with two personalities, initially introduced as two people named Angela and Ash. Angela was introduced as a maid who is treated poorly in public by her master the Lord Henry Barrymore of Houndsworth. Finnian was infatuated with her beauty and seeming kindness, until he learned of her dominatrix personality. She seemed to have the desire to be with Sebastian. When the Angela persona is in control, she wanted him to recognize her as a woman and had a place beside her in her bid for world domination. Ash was introduced as Queen Victoria's butler who delivered all of her requests to Ciel. He was connected to the organization that killed Ciel's parents and he had an obsession of purifying souls "unclean" with negative emotions. Eventually, he fell into insanity, leading Sebastian to comment he might be a fallen angel. He was killed by Sebastian's true form. He fought with a sword that resembles a fencing foil, which was strong enough to cut through steel.

Alois Trancy (アロイス・トランシー, Aroisu Toranshī)
Voiced by: Nana Mizuki (Japanese); Luci Christian (English)

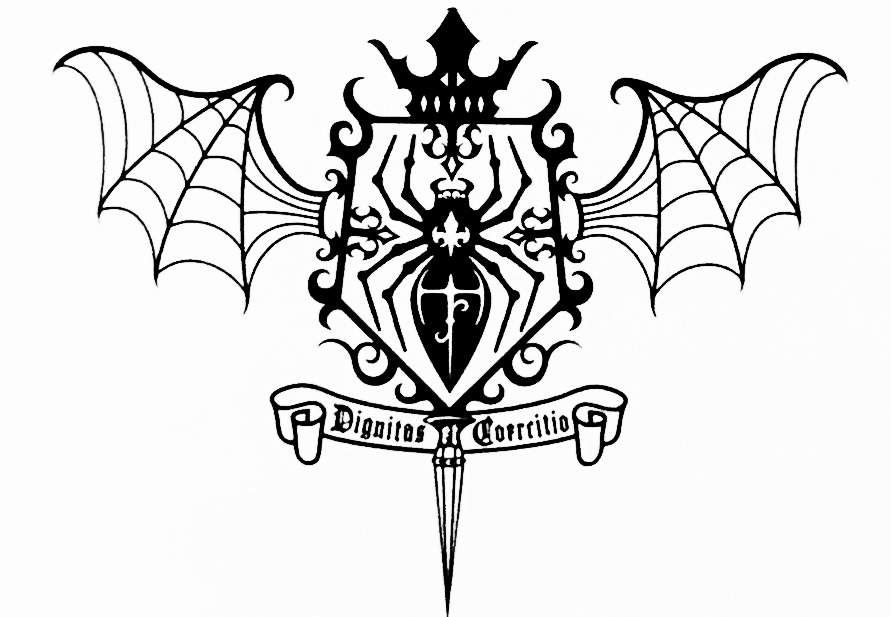
Trancy coat of arms

Earl Alois Trancy, also known as "Menino Aranha", born as Jim Macken (ジム・マッケン, Jimu Makken), was the head of the Trancy family. Despite acting like a carefree child, Alois was very morbid, cruel, eccentric, dramatic, manipulative, and foul-mouthed. Like Ciel, he suffered from a tragic past as a slave and formed a contract with the demon Claude Faustus in order to avenge the death of his younger brother Luka and the destruction of his village. Alois's contract mark was located on his tongue. Deceived by the lie that Sebastian was the one who killed his brother and destroyed his village, he spent the entire second season seeking Ciel in order to make Sebastian suffer. However, after learning the truth about what happened to Luka from his demon maid Hannah, he directed his affections to her and stopped trying to win Claude's approval. Afterwards, he formed a new contract with Hannah and his soul was consumed by her after his wish was fulfilled to change Ciel into a demon to prevent Sebastian or Claude from devouring his soul. Once Sebastian's duel with Claude was over, Hannah approached Claude's dead body and proclaimed that Alois and Luka would live happily in the afterlife with her and Claude.

Luka Macken (ルカマッケン, Ruka Makken)
Voiced by: Marina Inoue (Japanese); Lindsay Seidel (English)

Luka was Jim Macken's younger brother. When Jim and Luka were very young, their parents died and they were ostracized by their village, forcing them to steal in order to survive. Luka adored Jim and cared for him deeply, wishing for nothing but his happiness. In spite of their hardships, Luka was cheerful and kind to those that were kind to him in return. When his brother expressed his passionate desire to punish those who had wronged them, Luka met the demon Hannah Annafellows and formed a contract with her to destroy the village and its inhabitants to fulfill his brother's wish, sparing a single woman that showed concern for him when was being bullied. After the village was burned down, Jim and Luka split to collect the deceased citizens' valuables. However, Luka went to see Hannah and gave his soul to her, thanking her for granting his wish. Jim, who later changed his name to Alois Trancy, was never aware of Luka's contract to Hannah until years later when Hannah revealed the truth to him.

Claude Faustus (クロード・フォースタス, Kurōdo Fōsutasu)
Voiced by: Takahiro Sakurai (Japanese); Jason Douglas (English)

Claude and Alois' contract mark

Claude Faustus was the demon butler of the Trancy household. Like Sebastian, he did things perfectly and with ease, although in a more eccentric manner. Despite the fact that his master, Alois Trancy, possessed a rare soul similar to Ciel's, Claude became obsessed with Ciel's soul and subsequently killed Alois to be free to pursue Ciel. After a fierce duel with Sebastian over Ciel's soul, he is killed, but acknowledged that Alois's soul was truly worthy. Hannah approached Claude's dead body and proclaimed that Alois and Luka would live happily in the afterlife with her and Claude.

Hannah Annafellows (ハンナ・アナフェローズ, Hanna Anaferōzu)
Voiced by: Aya Hirano (Japanese); Caitlin Glass (English)

Hannah and Luka's contract mark

Hannah was Alois's demon maid and servant. In the first episode of the second season, Hannah's left eye was gouged out by Alois on the account that she stared at him directly. She was quiet and seemed to be very fearful of Alois as he often harmed and humiliated her. She was very skilled with combat and able to pull weapons out of nowhere and she was the sheath of the legendary sword called Lævateinn. Despite Alois's abusive treatment of her, Hannah was deeply loyal to Alois and cared for him. Near the end of the second season, Hannah revealed that she previously formed a contract with Alois's younger brother Luka (who she had grown to love during their short time together) and upon discovering that, Alois accepted Hannah's love and stopped trying to receive acknowledgement from Claude. Once Sebastian's duel with Claude was over, Hannah approached Claude's dead body and proclaimed that Alois and Luka would live happily in the afterlife with her and Claude.

Thompson (トンプソン, Tonpuson) , Timber (ティンバー, Tinbā) and Canterbury (カンタベリー, Kantaberī)
Voiced by: Kenichi Suzumura (Japanese); Scott Freeman (English)

Thompson (his fringes fall directly to the center), Timber (his fringe is swept to the right), and Canterbury (his fringe is swept to the left) are demon triplets and Alois's servants. Like Hannah, they appear to be terrified of Alois. Unlike the Phantomhive servants, they are very skilled in household work. Although they obey Claude, the triplets are Hannah's subordinates. Throughout the series, the triplets remain quiet, conversing to others by gestures and pictures, and to each other in hushed whispers. When they are given permission to speak (temporarily) by Alois, they have shown to be extremely rude and garrulous when voicing their honest opinions.

== Merchandise ==
Characters of the series have various pieces of merchandise created in their likeness. Jun Planning planned to release dolls of Sebastian, Ciel, and Grell in March 2009. However, on April 20, 2009, the company suspended all operations in Japan and prepared to file for bankruptcy. The company was later able to release a Ciel doll in September 2010. They also released two versions of a Taeyang Sebastian, the regular one in April 2009 and Taeyang Sebastian Private Teacher Version in September 2009. Good Smile Company released a figurine of Sebastian Michaelis in July 2009. Retail clothing chain Hot Topic added T-shirts featuring Sebastian to its merchandise.

== Reception ==
The characters of Black Butler were well received. Casey Brienza of Anime News Network felt that the butler was "gimmicky, [but] proves to be [an] effective character type". The servants of the Phantomhive household were described as "charming incompetents" by Carl Kimlinger, also from Anime News Network.
