= Yuya Matsushita =

Japanese singer and actor

Yuya Matsushita 松下 優也
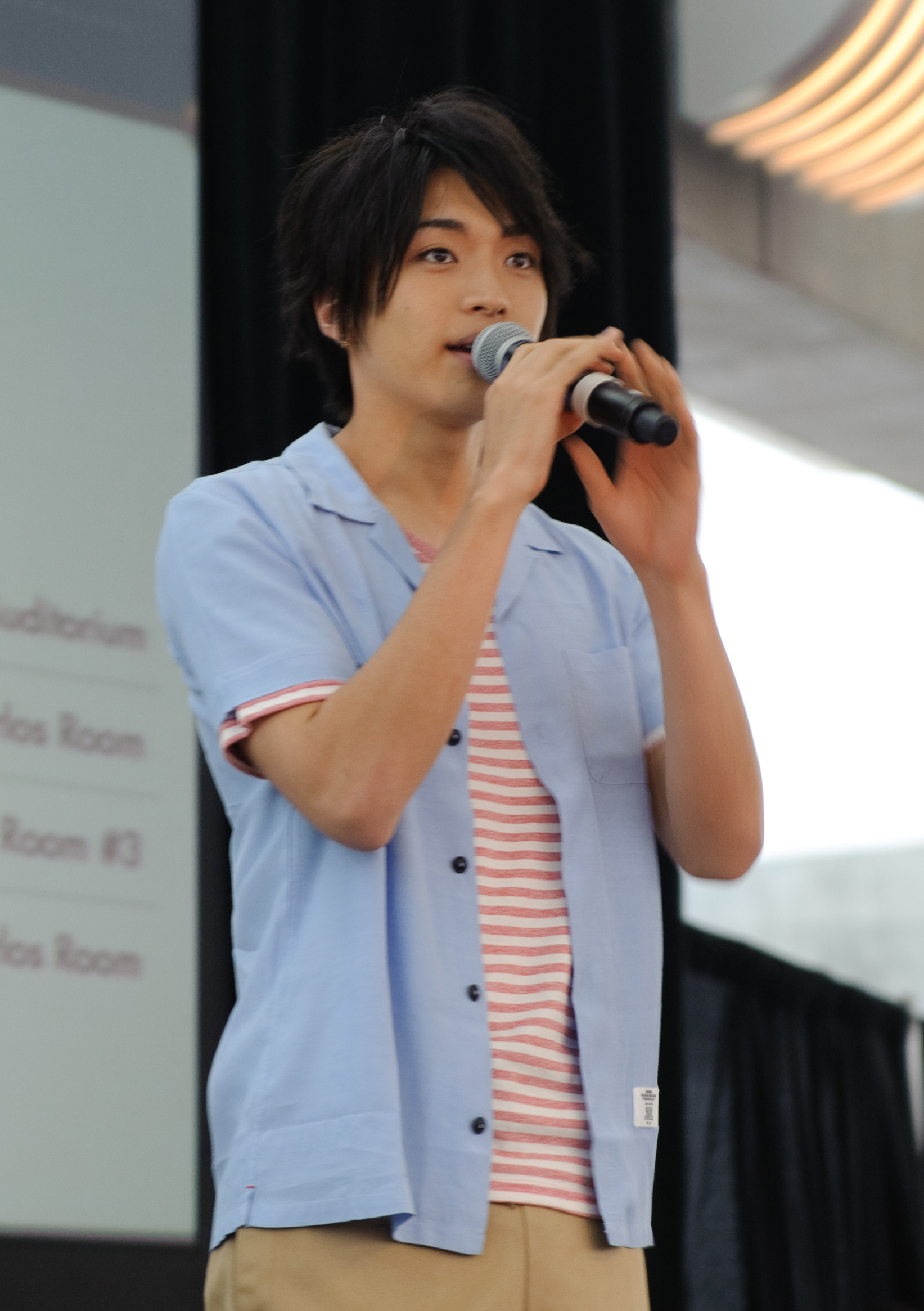
- Matsushita at FanimeCon 2011 Opening Ceremony

Background information
- Born: Yuya Matsushita; May 24, 1990 (age 36); Nishinomiya, Hyōgo, Japan
- Genres: J-pop, R&B, hip hop
- Occupations: Singer-songwriter; rapper; producer; actor; dancer
- Instruments: Vocals, piano
- Years active: 2008–present
- Labels: Epic Records Japan; Japanese Dream Records; XVISION
- Website: matsushitayuya.com xxxx4.jp

Yuya Matsushita (松下 優也, Matsushita Yūya; born May 24, 1990) is a Japanese pop and R&B singer and actor under Japanese Dream Records. His debut single "foolish foolish" was released on November 26, 2008. He had his first breakthrough as Sebastian Michaelis in the Black Butler musical and since then, been popular in both Japan and overseas.

In 2014, he started a boy band called X4, and the group released their debut album "XVISION" in 2015. The group held their major debut on October 7 of the same year with their single "Killing Me".

== Biography ==
Born in Nishinomiya, Hyōgo Prefecture, on May 24, 1990, Yuya Matsushita was raised by his mother and grandmother. At the age of 12 in 2002, Matsushita decided to pursue a career in music, enrolling in Caless Vocal & Dance School. Despite disagreements with his mother regarding his future plans, a trip to New York City in October 2005 strengthened his determination to become an artist. This became the turning point of his life as Matsushita decided to pursue music instead of going to high school. In 2007, Matsushita met producer Jin Nakamura who made the song "foolish foolish" for him.

In 2008, after being signed to Epic Records Japan Inc., the filming for Matsushita's 1st single, "foolish foolish" took place in New York. At the same time, Matsushita appeared in his 1st movie, Kanashii Boyfriend and his song, "Mr. "Broken Heart"" was also chosen to be the movie's theme song.

In 2009, Matsushita had his stage debut as Sebastian Michaelis in the Black Butler Musical-That Butler, Friendship. The solo version of the theme song, "彼方へ" was also featured in his 3rd single, "Honesty / 願いがかなうなら...".

In 2010, Matsushita's 4th single, "Trust Me" was used as the first ending theme song in the Durarara!! anime, and peaked at 10th in the weekly Oricon charts. The song was also widely used in a series of Durarara!! ending theme song parodies where characters from the ending sequence were replaced with characters from other anime. "ふたり" from his 4th single was used as the movie insert song of Toki o Kakeru Shōjo, which Yuya made an appearance in as Tetsuo Toi.

Matsushita reprised his role as Sebastian Michaelis in Musical Black Butler: The Most Beautiful Death in The World – A Thousand Souls and The Fallen Grim Reaper. The solo version of the theme song, "Hallucination" was also featured in his 5th single, "YOU". Matsushita subsequently collaborated with Mahou No Island and released "声にならなくて Feat. Sista", "first snow Feat. Sista" and "その時までのサヨナラ" for the novel "No Title". All 3 songs were released in his 1st album, "I am Me". "Bird" from his 6th single, "Bird / 4 Seasons" gained popularity as the first ending theme song for the Black Butler II anime. "4 Seasons" was used as a theme song for the Kobe Collection 2010 Autumn/Winter and Hikari, Sono Saki E, which Yuya starred in as himself.

In 2011, his 7th single, "Paradise" was used as the drama theme song for Quartet, which he had a lead role in as Takeru. "Naturally" from his 7th single was featured in three Natural Beauty Basic commercials. He was also the Guest of Honor for MusicFest at FanimeCon in 2011 where he performed for the first time overseas to a crowd of over 4,000 fans. Matsushita later starred in Asu no Hikari wo Tsukame 2 as Ren Kagami, a high school soccer captain.

In 2012, Matsushita released his 2nd album, "2U" on February 22, a reference to the fact he was turning 22. Dressed up as a butler, Matsushita appeared in his 1st commercial to promote Shionogi's Popon-S Plus, a reference to the role he had as Sebastian Michaelis, the butler in Black Butler. Matsushita played the role of Song Sam Dong in the Dream High musical, which is adapted from the hit Korean drama from July 3 to July 20. Matsushita also played a supporting role as Kakeru in Pillow Talk ~Bed Of Speculation~ as an oden store manager. On December 5, he released "U 〜Best Music Videos〜" and "U 〜Best of Best〜" simultaneously.

In 2013, he appeared in multiple stage plays, including Bug's Value ~Even More Bursting~, a reprisal of Black Butler: the Most Beautiful Death in the World, The Alucard Show, and My Host-chan S. Having departed from Sony earlier in the year, in July 2013, he launched the label Japanese Dream Records, releasing his 12th single "SWEET LOVE" in the same month. Additionally, on August 28, he released the album #musicoverdose under his new label.

In 2014, Matsushita continued to work mainly in musical theatre, appearing in musicals of Paco and the Magical Book, In the Heights, Tumbling Final, and Black Butler: Lycoris that Blazes the Earth, as well as reprising his role as Vlad in The Alucard Show. He also returned to his role as Kageki in Watashi no Host-chan in the special YouTube-based drama series produced by TV Asahi. He released digital singles "Eternal Now" on September 27 and "Whisper My Name" on October 18. He was awarded "amesta. of the Year 2014" (men's division) on December 15. On December 28, he announced that he would be halting his solo activities and forming a four-man group under his label to be known as X4. On February 22, they released their debut album XVISION. Matsushita starred in the film Akegarasu in May 2015.

On August 24, 2023, it was announced that Matsushita had become affiliated as an artist with the talent agency Amuse Inc.

In 2025, he is set to play the role of Lola in Kinky Boots.

== Discography ==
=== Singles ===
Released	Title
2008.11.26	"foolish foolish"
2009.01.28	"LAST SNOW"
2009.08.26	"Honesty / 願いがかなうなら..." (Honesty / Negai Ga Kanau Nara...)
2010.02.17	"Trust Me"
2010.05.05	"You"
2010.08.25	"Bird / 4 Seasons"
2011.02.02	"Paradise"
2011.05.04	"Naturally"
2011.08.24	"Super Drive"
2012.01.25	"キミへのラブソング～10年先も～" (Kimi E No Love Song ~10 Nen Saki Mo~)
2012.08.29	"See You"
2014.02.22	"She's A Liar" (English & Japanese Version plus remix)
2014.04.25	"Slow Dancin'"

=== Digital singles ===
Released	Title
2013.07.31	"Sweet Love"
2014.09.27	"Eternal Now"
2014.10.18	"Whisper My Name"

=== Albums ===
Released	Title
2010.06.02	I am Me
2012.02.22	2U
2012.12.05	U 〜Best of Best〜

=== Digital albums ===
Released	Title
2013.08.28	#musicoverdose
2015.02.22	XVISION

=== Others ===
Released	Title
2010.06.08	"I am Me" (Korean Version)
2010.10.08	"Bird / 4 Seasons" (Taiwan Version)
2012.02.28	"2U" (Korean Version)
2012.04.02	"2U" (Thai Version)
2012.12.18	"U 〜Best of Best〜" (Korean Version)
2013.05.23	"U 〜Best of Best〜" (Thai Version)

=== Videos ===
Released	Title
2011.05.25	20101225 ～Last Night Show～
2012.03.14	Yuya Matsushita Live Tour 2011 ～Super Drive～
2012.12.18	U 〜Best Music Video〜

=== Featured ===
Released	Title	Artist
2011.09.28	"夢の中で会えるでしょう" (Yume No Naka De Aerudeshou)	Masayuki Suzuki (Original By Hiroshi Takano)
2012.08.22	"Forever"	Bright

== Filmography ==
=== Film ===
Released	Title	Role
2009	悲しいボーイフレンド (Kanashii Boyfriend)	
2010	時をかける少女 (Toki o Kakeru Shōjo)	Tetsuo Toi
2010	光の惑星 (Hikari no Wakusei)	
2012	ヒカリ、その先へ (Hikari, Sono Saki E)	Himself
2015	アケガラス (Akegarasu)	Hiro

=== Stages ===
Released	Title	Role
2009	音楽舞闘会『黒執事』－その執事、友好－ (Black Butler Musical-That Butler, Friendship)	
2010	ミュージカル「黒執事」-The Most Beautiful Death in the World- 千の魂と堕ちた死神 (Musical Black Butler: The Most Beautiful Death in The World – A Thousand Souls and The Fallen Grim Reaper)	
2012	ミュージカル「ドリームハイ」 (Dream High)	
2013	バグズグバリュー～even more Bursting～ (Bugs' Value ~Even More Bursting~)	
2013	ミュージカル「黒執事」-The Most Beautiful Death in the World- 千の魂と堕ちた死神 (Musical Black Butler: The Most Beautiful Death in The World – A Thousand Souls and The Fallen Grim Reaper)	
2013	The Alucard Show	
2013	舞台「私のホストちゃん」 (My Host-chan)	
2014	舞台「Paco〜パコと魔法の絵本〜」 (Paco and the Magical Book)	
2014	イン・ザ・ハイツ (In the Heights)	Benny
2014	タンブリング Final (Tumbling Final)	
2014	黒執事「地に燃えるリコリス」 (Black Butler - Lycoris that Blazes the Earth)	
2014	The Alucard Show	
2015	モンティ・パイソンのSpamalot (Monty Python's Spamalot)	Sir Galahad
2020	サンセット大通り (Sunset Boulevard)	Joe Gillis
2024	JoJo's Bizarre Adventure: Phantom Blood	Jonathan Joestar
2024	キンキーブーツ (Kinky Boots)	Lola

=== Dramas ===
Released	Title	Role
2011	カルテット (Quartet)	Takeru
2011	Asu no Hikari wo Tsukame 2	Ren Kagami
2012	ピロートーク〜ベッドの思惑〜 (Pillow Talk ~Bed Of Speculation~)	Kakeru
2014	私のホストちゃんS (Watashi no Host-chan S)	
2016	Beppinsan	Eisuke Iwasa

=== Commercials ===
Released	Title
2012.02.25	ポポンSプラス (Pop-On S Plus)

=== Theatre ===
Year	Show	Role
2025	Kinky Boots	Lola
