= Yana Toboso =

Japanese manga artist (born 1984)

- 枢 やな
- Born: January 24, 1984 (age 42); Warabi, Saitama, Japan
- Other name: Yanao Rock (簗緒 ろく)
- Occupation: Manga artist
- Years active: 2004–present
- Employer: Square Enix
- Notable work: Black Butler
- Website: yanatoboso.com

Yana Toboso (枢 やな, Toboso Yana; born January 24, 1984) is a Japanese manga artist. She was born in Warabi, Saitama Prefecture, Japan, and currently resides in Yokohama as of 2017.

== Selected works ==
Rust Blaster is a 2006 six-chapter manga published by Square Enix in one volume. It tells the story of a human and a vampire who both attend Millennium Academy, a school for vampires and humans. Humans are protected here, and any assault on humans will result in punishment. Al, a vampire who is the son of the headmaster, is confronted by his father with a human boy, who he must protect. The human claims that he knows when the end of the world will occur. Subsequently, two moons form in the sky, signifying the end of the world. Now the pair, along with a few allies, must work together to protect the world where their species coexist.

Black Butler (黒執事, Kuroshitsuji) is a 2006 manga published in Square Enix's Monthly GFantasy magazine. The series follows Sebastian Michaelis, a demonic butler who is obligated to serve Ciel Phantomhive, the thirteen-year-old head of the Phantomhive noble family, due to a contract he made with Ciel stating that he must help him gain revenge on the people who humiliated him after his parents were killed and house burned. An anime adaption originally premiered in October 2008.

Disney: Twisted-Wonderland is a 2020 mobile game made by Aniplex in collaboration with Walt Disney Japan. The game centers around characters inspired by villains from Disney films and is described as a "villains academy adventure game" that has rhythm game elements and battles. The main concept, scenario, and character designs are by Yana Toboso. Yana Toboso is also the head of the creative team behind the game's main story and creates most of the current art for the game.
