= Black Butler =

Japanese manga series

- First tankōbon volume cover, featuring Sebastian Michaelis

黒執事 (Kuroshitsuji)
- Genre: Dark comedy; Dark fantasy; Supernatural
- Manga
- Written by: Yana Toboso
- Published by: Square Enix
- English publisher: NA: Yen Press
- Imprint: G Fantasy Comics
- Magazine: Monthly GFantasy
- English magazine: NA: Yen Plus
- Original run: September 16, 2006 – present
- Volumes: 36
Further information
Anime television series
Directed by	Toshiya Shinohara (S1); Hirofumi Ogura (S2)
Produced by	Hiroo Maruyama; Hiroyuki Shimizu; Shunsuke Saito; Mikihiro Iwata
Written by	Mari Okada
Music by	Taku Iwasaki
Studio	A-1 Pictures
Licensed by	Crunchyroll (Note: Formerly known as Funimation.) (Note: In the United Kingdom through Crunchyroll UK and Ireland (formerly known as Manga Entertainment) and in Australia through Crunchyroll Store Australia (formerly known as Madman Entertainment).); NA: Aniplex of America; SEA: Muse Communication
Original network	MBS
English network	AU: C31, TVS; SEA: Animax Asia; US: Funimation Channel
Original run	October 3, 2008 – September 17, 2010
Episodes	36 + 7 OVA
Anime television series
Black Butler: Book of Circus
Directed by	Noriyuki Abe
Produced by	Yasutaka Kimura; Kozue Kaneniwa; Ryū Hashimoto; Shinobu Satō; Ayako Yokoyama; Katsunori Kubo; Hirotsugu Ogisu
Written by	Hiroyuki Yoshino
Music by	Yasunori Mitsuda
Studio	A-1 Pictures
Licensed by	Crunchyroll (Note: In Australia through Crunchyroll Store Australia (formerly known as Madman Entertainment).); BI: Anime Limited; SEA: Muse Communication
Original network	MBS
English network	UK: Viceland
Original run	July 11, 2014 – September 12, 2014
Episodes	10
Original video animation
Black Butler: Book of Murder
Directed by	Noriyuki Abe
Produced by	Yasutaka Kimura; Kozue Kaneniwa; Ryū Hashimoto; Shinobu Satō; Ayako Yokoyama; Katsunori Kubo; Hirotsugu Ogisu
Written by	Hiroyuki Yoshino
Music by	Yasunori Mitsuda
Studio	A-1 Pictures
Licensed by	Crunchyroll
Released	October 25, 2014 – November 15, 2014
Runtime	60 minutes (each)
Episodes	2
Anime television series
Black Butler: Public School Arc
Directed by	Kenjirou Okada
Produced by	Yasutaka Kimura; Kanako Takahashi; Shizuka Kurosaki; Yuuichi Fukushima
Written by	Hiroyuki Yoshino
Music by	Ryo Kawasaki
Studio	CloverWorks
Licensed by	Crunchyroll; SA/SEA: Muse Communication
Original network	Tokyo MX, GYT, GTV, BS11, MBS
Original run	April 13, 2024 – June 22, 2024
Episodes	11
Anime television series
Black Butler: Emerald Witch Arc
Directed by	Kenjirou Okada
Written by	Hiroyuki Yoshino
Music by	Ryo Kawasaki
Studio	CloverWorks
Licensed by	Crunchyroll; SA/SEA: Muse Communication
Original network	Tokyo MX, GYT, GTV, BS11, MBS
Original run	April 5, 2025 – June 28, 2025
Episodes	13
Films
Black Butler (2014 live-action film); Black Butler: Book of the Atlantic (2017 anime film)
- icon

Black Butler (Japanese: 黒執事, Hepburn: Kuroshitsuji) is a Japanese manga series written and illustrated by Yana Toboso. It has been serialized in Square Enix's shōnen manga magazine Monthly GFantasy since September 2006. The series follows Ciel Phantomhive, the 12-year-old Earl of Phantomhive serving as the Queen's Watchdog. He is tasked with solving crimes in the underworld of Victorian-era London. Ciel has formed a contract with demon Sebastian Michaelis, who disguises himself as his butler, to seek revenge on those who tortured him and murdered his parents. In exchange for his services, Sebastian will be allowed to consume Ciel's soul.

A 24-episode anime television series adaptation, produced by A-1 Pictures, aired from October 2008 to March 2009. A second 12-episode season aired from July to September 2010; this season features two new main characters and has an anime-original storyline which does not feature manga content. Another series, titled Black Butler: Book of Circus, was broadcast between July and September 2014. A two-part theatrical original video animation (OVA), titled Black Butler: Book of Murder, screened in Japanese theaters in October and November 2014. A live-action film adaptation was released in Japan in January 2014. An animated film, titled Black Butler: Book of the Atlantic, premiered in Japan in January 2017. A fourth 11-episode season produced by CloverWorks, titled Black Butler: Public School Arc, aired from April to June 2024. A fifth season, titled Black Butler: Emerald Witch Arc, aired from April to June 2025.

In North America, the series has been licensed by Yen Press. It was published in Yen Plus from August 2009 to July 2010. The anime series was licensed by Funimation. Funimation lost the rights to the first two seasons, and they were later acquired by Aniplex of America.

By August 2025, the Black Butler manga had over 36 million copies in circulation, making it one of the best-selling manga series.

== Plot ==
Twelve-year-old earl Ciel Phantomhive lives in Victorian-era London. He acquired his title and position after the events of his tenth birthday on December 14, 1885, when the Phantomhive manor was attacked by unidentified perpetrators. Ciel's parents died along with the family dog, Sebastian, and he is taken and sold into slavery. He ends up in the hands of a sadistic, demon-worshiping cult and endures physical, mental, and sexual abuse at the hands of his captors.

One night, during a sacrificial ceremony to summon a demon, the demon arrives but states that he came in response to Ciel's summoning, not the cult's. Ciel sells his soul to the demon and forms a contract to be saved; the demon kills all the cultist members and places the Faustian contract symbol on Ciel's right eye. As part of the contract, the demon will consume Ciel's soul as payment for helping him achieve his goal; revenge on those who brought down his family and the House of Phantomhive. Ciel names the demon Sebastian Michaelis, after his deceased dog. The duo returns to society as Ciel takes over his late father's position as the Queen's Watchdog: someone tasked with investigating cases that Queen Victoria herself deems threatening to England. To assist with this task, Sebastian recruits notable individuals such as the sniper Mey-Rin, the veteran soldier Baldroy, and Finnian, a teenager with superhuman strength, who join the Phantomhive estate, disguised as Ciel's servants.

As Ciel and Sebastian resolve several incidents under the Queen's orders, some of them are related to the "Aurora Society", a secret organization performing experiments involving reanimated corpses, led by a grim reaper with ties to the Phantomhive family known as "Undertaker". Undertaker eventually reveals that his true objective was to reanimate the body of Ciel's older twin brother and the real Ciel Phantomhive, who was the original heir of the Phantomhive estate. It is also revealed that both twins were captured and used in the ritual to summon Sebastian, with the original Ciel being sacrificed in the process and Ciel's younger brother assuming his identity to take revenge for their family. The revived "Ciel" incriminates his brother for the crimes committed by the Aurora Society and assumes control of the Phantomhive estate, forcing Ciel and his subordinates to flee. Branded as fugitives, Ciel, Sebastian, and their allies begin investigating the Aurora Society further in order to prove Ciel's innocence and stop Undertaker's plans.

== Media ==
=== Manga ===
Written and illustrated by Yana Toboso, Black Butler started in Square Enix's shōnen manga magazine Monthly GFantasy on September 16, 2006. In June 2024, it was announced that the manga would enter a hiatus, and that Toboso would be conducting research and making preparations as the series heads toward its climax. The series resumed on April 18, 2025. Square Enix has collected its chapters into individual tankōbon volumes. The first volume was released on February 27, 2007. As of September 26, 2026, thirty-six volumes have been released.

Yen Press licensed the series for an English language release and serialized the manga in Yen Plus' August 2009 issue for the magazine's first anniversary. The publisher released the first volume on January 26, 2010. As of June 18, 2024, 33 volumes have been released.

=== Drama CDs ===
On August 10, 2007, a drama CD was released by Frontier Works. It featured many of the characters appearing in volumes one and two. A second drama CD was released on November 26, 2008, under the Aniplex label.

=== Anime ===
In July 2008, an anime adaptation of Black Butler was announced, directed by Toshiya Shinohara and produced by A-1 Pictures. It premiered in October 2008 and broadcast on MBS as well as the TBS. During an event on June 14, 2009, it was announced that the anime would be returning for a second series. Japanese voice actor Junichi Suwabe confirmed this news on his official blog later that day. The second series, Black Butler II (黒執事 II, Kuroshitsuji Tsū), premiered in July and follows a butler, Claude Faustus, and his master, Alois Trancy, as well as Sebastian and Ciel. Both new characters were designed by Toboso. Aniplex released the complete Blu-ray and DVD set of both seasons and their extra OVAs on May 7, 2014.

On March 29, 2010, North American anime distributor Funimation announced on their online FuniCon 3.0 panel that they had licensed Black Butler. At Anime Expo 2010, Funimation also announced that they would stream the simulcast series, Black Butler II. Funimation announced on their Facebook page that they had fully licensed the second season. Funimation released Black Butler Combo Pack Blu-ray/DVD first and second season on April 3, 2012. The series made its North American television debut on February 8, 2011, on the Funimation Channel. Funimation lost the rights to the series' first season in 2017, and the rights to the second season in 2018. The first season is currently licensed by Aniplex of America and it was released on a Blu-ray Disc box set on January 29, 2019. In November 2019, Funimation re-licensed the first two seasons for its streaming service.

On January 16, 2014, it was announced that a third Black Butler anime series was in production. Titled Black Butler: Book of Circus (黒執事 Book of Circus, Kuroshitsuji Bukku obu Sākasu), the series was a close adaptation of the manga, unlike the previous seasons, adapting the "Noah's Ark Circus" arc. The series was directed by Noriyuki Abe at A-1 Pictures, with Hiroyuki Yoshino in charge of scripts, along with Ichiro Okuchi and Yuka Miyata as scriptwriters. The main cast from the previous anime series returned, along with new cast members, and the series aired from July 11, 2014, to September 12, 2014. In addition, a two-part original video animation (OVA) titled the Book of Murder, an adaptation of the "Phantomhive Manor Murders" arc, was screened in Japanese theatres on October 25, and November 15, 2014. The OVAs featured returning staff from the previous season.

On August 7, 2014, Funimation announced that they have licensed Black Butler: Book of Circus, and have streamed it on their simulcast. Funimation released the series on Blu-ray and DVD on April 19, 2016. Additionally, Funimation has licensed the two-part OVA Black Butler: Book of Murder and released it on May 17, 2016.

At Anime Expo 2023, Crunchyroll announced that a fourth season was in production. Titled Black Butler: Public School Arc (黒執事 -寄宿学校編-, Kuroshitsuji Kishuku Gakkō-hen), it was directed by Kenjirou Okada and produced by CloverWorks, with Hiroyuki Yoshino handling series composition, Yumi Shimizu designing the characters, and Ryo Kawasaki composing the music. The series was broadcast for eleven episodes from April 13 to June 22, 2024, on Tokyo MX and other networks. Muse Communication licensed the series in Asia-Pacific.

At Anime Expo 2024, it was announced that a fifth season, titled Black Butler: Emerald Witch Arc (黒執事 -緑の魔女編-, Kuroshitsuji Midori no Majo-hen), was in production. Licensed by Crunchyroll, it was again directed by Kenjirou Okada and produced by CloverWorks. The series aired from April 5 to June 28, 2025, on Tokyo MX and other networks.

=== Musical ===
That Butler, Friendship (その執事、友好, Sono Shitsuji, Yūkō), a musical adaptation of the manga, had run at the Sunshine Theater in Ikebukuro between May 28, 2009, and June 7, 2009. Yuya Matsushita portrayed Sebastian Michaelis, Shougo Sakamoto played Ciel Phantomhive and Uehara Takuya as Grell Sutcliff.

Musical Black Butler: The Most Beautiful Death in the World – A Thousand Souls and The Fallen Grim Reaper (ミュージカル｢黒執事｣〜ザ・モースト・ビューティフル・デス・イン・ザ・ワールド〜千の魂と堕ちた死神, Miūjikaru Kuroshitsuji – Za Mōsuto Byūtifuru Desu in za Wārudo – Sen no Tamashii to Ochita Shinigami), the second musical adaptation of the manga, ran at Akasaka Act Theater (1300 seats) in Akasaka, Tokyo, Nagoya, and Osaka, between May 3 and May 23, 2010. Yuya Matsushita reprised his role as Sebastian Michaelis, Yukito Nishii played Ciel Phantomhive, and Uehara Takuya reprised his role as Grell Sutcliff. The other two main characters, Eric Slingby and Alan Humphries, were portrayed by Taisuke Saeki and Shinya Matsumoto, respectively. The musical was written by Mari Okada, directed by Sakurako Fukuyama, with music composed by Taku Iwasaki, and lyrics by Yukinojo Mori. A second run of The Most Beautiful Death in the World was announced in December 2012. It ran between May 17 and June 9, 2013, in the Akasaka ACT Theater (Akasaka, Tokyo) again, and the Umeda Arts Theater in Osaka. It was announced in February 2013 that Yuya Matsushita, Uehara Takuya, and Shuhei Izumi would reprise their roles as Sebastian Michaelis, Grell Sutcliff, and the Undertaker, respectively. The rest of the roles were re-cast, with Taketo Tanaka replacing Yukito Nishii as Ciel Phantomhive, and Shinji Rachi and Masataka Nakagauchi replacing Taisuke Saeki and Matsumoto Shinya in the roles of Eric Slingby and Alan Humphries.

A third musical Lycoris that Blazes the Earth (地に燃えるリコリス, Chi ni Moeru Lycoris) was performed in September 2014. Most of the cast reprised their roles from the re-run of The Most Beautiful Death in the World although Fukuzaki Nayuta replaced Taketo Tanaka as Ciel Phantomhive and Yuka Terasaki replaced Saki Matsuda as Mey-Rin. Akane Liv was introduced as Madam Red, Yuusuke Hirose as Charles Phipps, Oota Motohiro as Charles Grey and Araki Hirofumi as Lau. A re-run of the third Black Butler musical "Lycoris that Blazes the Earth" was scheduled to perform in November–December 2015. It started in Osaka on November 7 then travel to Miyagi, Tokyo and Fukuoka. The new run of the third musical was the first oversea tour in China (Shanghai, Beijing, Shenzhen) in December 2015. Yuta Furukawa replaced Matsushita as Sebastian Michaelis. Meanwhile, most of the cast from the third musical reprised their roles.

A fourth musical, based on the Noah's Ark Circus arc of the manga, ran between November and December 2016. Yuta Furukawa reprised his role as Sebastian Michaelis, with Reo Uchikawa replacing Nayuta Fukuzaki as Ciel. Miura Ryosuke was introduced as Joker, Tano Asami as Beast and Tamaki Yuki as Snake, among others. Notably, Izumi Shuuhei reprised his role as the Undertaker again, making him the only original cast member still performing.

A fifth musical, Tango on the Campania, based on the Luxury Liner arc in the manga, ran between December 2017 and February 2018. Yuta Furukawa reprised his role as Sebastian Michaelis, with Reo Uchikawa also reprising his role as Ciel Phantomhive. Mikata Ryosuke was introduced as Ronald Knox, Momoko Okazaki as Elizabeth Midford, and others. Other actors from previous performers also reprised their roles, such as Uehara Takuya as Grell Sutcliff, Izumi Shuuhei as the Undertaker, and Sasaki Yoshihide as Viscount Druitt.

A sixth Black Butler musical, The Public School's Secret, based on the Public School arc of the manga, ran from March to April 2021. Toshiki Tateishi portrayed Sebastian Michaelis, and Eito Konishi played Ciel Phantomhive. The four prefects were portrayed by Hiroki Sana (Edgar Redmond), Shougo Tazuru (Herman Greenhill), Masamichi Satonaka (Lawrence Bluewer), and Dai Goto (Gregory Violet).

A seventh musical, The Emerald Witch and the Werewolves' Forest, ran in two cities: from September 12 to 15, 2025, in Osaka, and from September 21 to 28 in Tokyo. It featured Toshiki Tateishi as Sebastian Michaelis and Ikuma Kobayashi as Ciel Phantomhive.

=== Video game ===
A video game for Nintendo DS, called Kuroshitsuji Phantom & Ghost was developed by Square Enix and was released on March 19, 2009. The game is sold in two versions, a limited first-press edition with a higher price and numerous extra goods, and a regular edition.

=== Print ===
The Black Butler Character Book "That Butler, Assembles" (黒執事 キャラクターガイド ｢その執事、集合｣, Kuroshitsuji Character Guide "Sono Shitsuji, Shūgō") was released on February 27, 2009. The book TV Animation Black Butler Black Record (TVアニメーション｢黒執事｣ Black Record) was released on March 27, 2009. An official comics anthology, titled Rainbow Butler (虹執事, Nijishitsuji), was also released on that date; a second Rainbow Butler volume was released on August 27, 2010.

=== Films ===
It was announced on January 18, 2013, that the manga would be made into a live-action film starring Ayame Goriki as Genpou Shiori, Hiro Mizushima as Sebastian Michaelis. Filming began in April 2013 and the film was released on January 18, 2014.

On October 10, 2015, it was announced an animated film for the series has been green-lit, and the original anime cast returned to reprise their roles. On February 17, 2016, the film Black Butler: Book of the Atlantic, was confirmed to be an animated adaptation of the "Luxury Liner" (豪華客船, Gōka Kyakusen) arc from the original manga. It was released in Japan on January 21, 2017. On April 1, 2017, Funimation announced that they have licensed the animated film and would screen it in a limited theatrical release in North America later in the year. Black Butler: Book of the Atlantic, premiered in Japan on January 21, 2017, and in North America on the selected dates of June 12 and 14, 2017.

== Reception ==
By August 2025, the Black Butler manga had over 36 million copies in circulation worldwide. Individual volumes have appeared in Oricon's weekly chart of best-selling manga, taking several high spots. In addition to the volumes, the comics anthology Rainbow Butler ranked seventeenth during the week of March 31 to April 6 2009, selling 41,083 copies after ranking thirty-third the previous week. The fourth and fifth volumes ranked thirty-third and thirty-ninth of the top-selling manga in Japan during 2008, selling 529,210 copies and 468,550 copies respectively. The sixth volume ranked thirteenth of the top-selling manga in Japan during the first half of 2009, selling 619,501 copies. The series itself was ranked tenth of the top-selling manga series in Japan during 2009, selling a total of 1,603,197 estimated copies.

The Japanese music distributor Recochoku has created an annual survey of which anime characters that people would like to marry. Sebastian Michaelis ranked ninth in the category "The Character I Want to Be My Groom".

== See also ==
- List of Gangan Comics manga franchises
- Earl Cain, a similar Victorian-themed Gothic manga from 1991
