= Itsuka (song) =

- Regular edition cover

Single by SID

from the album M&W
- Language: Japanese
- B-side: "Akikaze"
- Released: September 28, 2011
- Genre: Rock
- Length: 12:39
- Label: Ki/oon
- Composers: Shinji; Aki (B-side)
- Lyricist: Mao

SID singles chronology
"Ranbu no Melody" (2010)	"Itsuka" (2011)	"Fuyu no Bench" (2011)

Music video
- "Itsuka" on YouTube

"Itsuka" (いつか) is a single by Japanese rock band SID, released on September 28, 2011. The song was the opening theme for the television program Countdown TV.

== Promotion and release ==
The release and details of the single were announced in early August 2011. "Itsuka" was played for the first time on September 16 on the radio program Yamada Hisashi's Radian Limited F, along with "X X X" by L'Arc-en-Ciel. It was released in three editions, one regular and two limited editions. The limited editions, named A and B, included a bonus DVD containing a live recording of the track “NO LDK” from the Dead Stock 2011 album tour; this recording differs between the two versions.

Sid held an event for buyers of the single at six locations in Japan. The event consisted of spending time with one of the band members, and the 6,000 participants were chosen by lottery.

A commercial for the single starred the comedian Jun Itoda.

== Composition and themes ==
The title track was composed by guitarist Shinji, while the B-side "Akikaze" was composed by bassist Aki. CD Journal described "Itsuka" as rock with screaming guitar riffs, yet with a sentimental and moving melody, and mentioned its sad lyrics.

== Commercial performance ==
"Itsuka" reached number two on weekly Oricon Singles Chart and remained on chart for six weeks. It also reached second place on Tower Records' Japanese rock and pop singles chart.

It is the band's ninth best-selling single, according to Oricon's ranking.

== Track listing ==
All lyrics are written by Mao.

No.	Title	Music	Length
1.	"Itsuka" (いつか)	Shinji	4:51
2.	"Akikaze" (秋風)	Aki	4:12
3.	"NO LDK" (Live from Dead Stock Tour 2011)	Shinji	3:35
Total length:			12:39

== Personnel ==
- Mao – vocals
- Shinji – guitar
- Aki – bass
- Yūya – drums
