= Fuyu no Bench =

- Regular edition cover

Single by SID

from the album M&W
- Language: Japanese
- B-side: "Otori"
- Released: December 28, 2011
- Genre: Ballad
- Label: Ki/oon
- Songwriters: Yūya; Shinji (B-side)
- Lyricist: Mao

SID singles chronology
"Itsuka" (2011)	"Fuyu no Bench" (2011)	"Nokoriga" (2012)

Music video
- "Fuyu no Bench" on YouTube

"Fuyu no Bench" (冬のベンチ) is a single by Japanese band SID, released on December 28, 2011, by Ki/oon. The song has a winter theme.

== Promotion and release ==
The specifications of the single were announced in November 2011. Mao, SID's vocalist, invited personally actor Riki Takeuchi to appear in the TV commercial of the single because he admired his performance in the series Minami no Emperor. It shows the actor doing bench presses on a park before meeting Mao.

"Fuyu no Bench" was released in three editions: the regular edition and limited editions A and B. Regular edition includes a three-track CD: the title track, the B-side "Otori", and a live recording of "Alibi" from the 2011 tour promoting Dead Stock. The limited editions contain a CD with only the first two tracks and a DVD that differs between versions A and B.

== Composition and themes ==
“Fuyu no Bench” is a ballad song, described as a "warm winter love song" by the Japanese website Barks and "a song about encounters and farewells" by CD Journal. The latter also noted that the string arrangement brings a "slightly melancholic tone" and considered the lyrics "easy to understand." Still on the lyrics, Barks mentioned that they describe "a rare happy ending." It was composed by drummer Yūya, while the B-side was composed by Shinji. Mao selected the keywords "Dajare" and “Impact” for the single and commercial.

== Commercial performance ==
"Fuyu no Bench" reached sixth place on weekly Oricon Albums Chart and remained on chart for six weeks. It reached fourth place on Tower Records' Japanese pop and rock singles chart. It is the band's 12th best-selling single, according to Oricon's ranking.

== Track listing ==
All lyrics are written by Mao.

No.	Title	Music	Length
1.	"Fuyu no Bench" (冬のベンチ)	Yūya	5:06
2.	"Otori" (囮)	Shinji	3:45
3.	"Alibi" (Live from Dead Stock Tour 2011)		4:07
Total length:			12:59

== Personnel ==
- Mao – vocals
- Shinji – guitar
- Aki – bass
- Yūya – drums
