= 4S =

4S may refer to:

== Places ==
- 4S Ranch, California, an unincorporated community in San Diego County

== Other uses ==
- iPhone 4S, the 5th generation of the iPhone
- Scandinavian Simvastatin Survival Study, a multicenter clinical trial that was performed in 1990s in Scandinavia
- Society for Social Studies of Science, a non-profit scholarly association devoted to the social studies of science and technology
- Toshiba 4S, a nuclear reactor
- Toyota S engine
- DS 4S, a car
- 4S, the production code for the 1977 Doctor Who serial The Talons of Weng-Chiang

== See also ==
- S4 (disambiguation)
- SSSS (disambiguation)
- Fours (disambiguation)
- S (disambiguation)
- 4 (disambiguation)
