= Dead stock =

Dead stock may refer to:

- Vintage clothing § Deadstock
- Inventory § Distressed inventory
- Dead Stock, 2011 album by SID
