= S4 =

S4, S 4, Š-4, S.4 or S-4 may refer to:

== People ==
- S4 (gamer), Gustav Magnusson, Swedish Dota 2 player
- S4 (military), a logistics officer within military units

== Places ==
- County Route S4 (California), a road in San Diego, California

== Science and mathematics ==
=== Mathematics ===
- S4 algebra, a variety of modal algebras, also called Interior algebra
- Tetrahedral symmetry, the symmetric group S_{4}
- S4 (modal logic), a normal modal logic

=== Chemistry ===
- S4: Keep away from living quarters, a safety phrase in chemistry
- Tetrasulfur (S_{4}), an allotrope of sulfur
- Andarine (S-4), a selective androgen receptor modulator and experimental drug

=== Biology ===
- Fourth heart sound, or S_{4}, an abnormal heart sound often indicative of congestive heart failure or cor pulmonale
- Fourth sacrum of the vertebral column in human anatomy
- Sacral spinal nerve 4, a spinal nerve of the sacral segment

== Technology ==
- S (programming language) version 4
- Hibernation (computing) a sleeping state in a computer
- SG2 Shareable (Fire Control) Software Suite (S4)
- Nikon S4, a 1958 35 mm film rangefinder camera
- Nikon Coolpix S4, a camera
- Samsung Galaxy S4, a smartphone
- Samsung Galaxy S4 Mini, a mini version of the Samsung Galaxy S4
- Samsung Galaxy Tab S4, an Android tablet

== Transportation ==
=== Routes ===
==== Austria ====
- S4, a Carinthia S-Bahn line
- S4, a Salzburg S-Bahn line that extends into Germany
- S4, a Tyrol S-Bahn line
- S4, an Upper Austria S-Bahn line
- S4, a Vienna S-Bahn line
- S4, a Vorarlberg S-Bahn line

==== Germany ====
- S4 (Berlin), a Berlin S-Bahn line
- S4 (Munich), a Munich S-Bahn line
- S4 (Nuremberg), a Nuremberg S-Bahn line
- S4 (Rhine-Main S-Bahn), a Rhine-Main S-Bahn line
- S4 (Rhine-Ruhr S-Bahn), a Rhine-Ruhr S-Bahn line
- S4, a Bremen S-Bahn line
- S4, a Hanover S-Bahn line
- S4, a Karlsruhe Stadtbahn, line
- S4, a Rhine-Neckar S-Bahn line
- S4, a planned Rostock S-Bahn line canceled in 2012
- S4, a Stuttgart S-Bahn line

==== Switzerland ====
- S4 (St. Gallen S-Bahn), a St. Gallen S-Bahn line
- S4 (RER Vaud), an old number for RER Vaud S-Bahn line R4
- S4 (ZVV), Zurich S-Bahn line

==== Other routes ====
- S4, a Brussels Regional Express Network line in Belgium
- Line S4 (Milan suburban railway service), Italy
- Line S4 (Nanjing Metro), China

=== Vehicles ===
- Alco S-4, a locomotive
- Audi S4, a car
- Lancia Delta S4, a 1984 Group B rally car
- Hydra Technologies Ehécatl, S4, a Mexican unmanned aerial vehicle
- Letov Š-4, a 1923 Czechoslovak aircraft
- Prussian S 4, an 1894 steam locomotives class
- Seibel S-4, a 1951 helicopter
- Supermarine S.4, a 1925 British seaplane
- USS S-4 (SS-109), a 1919 US Navy submarine

== Groups, companies, organizations ==
- S04, FC Schalke 04, a German professional sports club
- Shift4 Payments, a U.S. payment processor
- Azores Airlines, by IATA airline designator

== Other ==
- S4 (classification), a disability swimming classification
- Form S-4, a form required by the Securities and Exchange Commission to declare mergers and acquisitions
- S4 standard, a set of standards for model railways (P4 gauge)

== See also ==
- SSSS (disambiguation)
- 4S (disambiguation)
- S (disambiguation)
- 4 (disambiguation)
