= ES =

Es, ES, or similar may refer to:

== Arts and entertainment ==
- An alternate name for the musical note E♭ (E-flat)
- E's, a manga series by Satoru Yuiga
- Es (film), the German title of It, a 1966 West German film directed by Ulrich Schamoni
- ES (Eternal Sabbath), a manga by Fuyumi Soryo
- ES, a supplement of the Evening Standard newspaper
- Es, a fictional character from the BlazBlue series
- Eternal Sunshine (album), 2024 album by Ariana Grande

== Businesses, organizations, and products ==
- Gibson ES Series, a line of guitars
- Lexus ES, a series of automobiles
- E-mini S&P, a futures contract on the Chicago Mercantile Exchange (symbol ES)
- Eurostar (National Rail abbreviation ES)
- DHL International Aviation ME (IATA airline code ES)

== Language ==
- Es, a phonetic spelling of the Latin alphabet letter S
- -es, a word ending
- Spanish language (ISO 639 alpha-2 language code)
- Es (cyrillic), a letter in the Cyrillic alphabet that looks like the Latin letter C

== Places ==
- Spain (ISO 3166-1 country code)
- El Salvador (FIPS 10-4 country code)
- Espírito Santo, a state in Brazil (ISO 3166-2:BR code)
- Eš, a village in the Czech Republic
- ES, an abbreviation for "elementary school", as seen on some maps, etc. (e.g., Matsukage ES, Yawatahama, Japan)

== Science and technology ==
=== Chemical element Es ===
- Einsteinium, first made in 1952 (atomic number: 99)
- Hesperium (or Esperium), misidentified as an element in 1934

=== Computer software ===
- Es (operating system), developed by Nintendo, then Google
- es (Unix shell), a command-line interpreter
- Expert system, to automate decision making

=== Other computing uses ===
- .es, the top-level Internet domain for Spain
- ES EVM, a Soviet series of IBM computer clones
- ES register, in x86 computer architecture
- ECMAScript, popularly known as JavaScript
- Elasticsearch, a search engine
- Elementary stream, part of the MPEG communication protocol

=== Units of measure ===
- Exasecond (Es), an SI unit of time (greater than all elapsed time)
- Exasiemens (ES), an SI unit of electric conductance

=== Other uses in science and technology ===
- Edison screw, a type of lightbulb socket (e.g. ES14, ES27)
- Embryonic stem cell, in biology, from a fertilised ovum
- Electronic support, in military telecommunications

== Other uses ==
- Es, the German term for the id, one of the psychic apparatus defined in Sigmund Freud's structural model of the psyche
- Séreie économique et sociale, a specialization within the French academic "baccalauréat" degree
- Expected shortfall, a measure of risk
- Electrical sensitivity, otherwise known as Electromagnetic hypersensitivity (EHS)

== See also ==
- ÉS (disambiguation)
- ES engine (disambiguation)
