= SSSS =

SSSS may refer to:

== Arts, entertainment, and media ==
- Ssss, music album by duo VCMG, Vince Clarke and Martin Gore, released in 2012
- Superhuman Samurai Syber-Squad, an American TV series based on Gridman
- SSSS.Gridman, anime series
- Stand Still, Stay Silent, webcomic

== Other uses ==
- Staphylococcal scalded skin syndrome, a skin reaction
- Society for the Scientific Study of Sexuality
- Only Unity Saves the Serbs (Serbian: Само Слога Србина Спасава, romanized: Samo Sloga Srbina Spasava), a Serbian slogan initialized as СССС in Cyrillic, or SSSS in Latin script.
- Secondary Security Screening Selection in U.S. airports

== See also ==
- 4S (disambiguation)
- S4 (disambiguation)
- S (disambiguation)
- SSS (disambiguation)
- ,
  - Ssssh, 1969 album by Ten Years After
  - Sssshhh..., 2003 Indian slasher film
  - Sssssss, 1973 American body horror film
