= Fours =

Fours may refer to several things:

== Places ==
Fours may refer to the following places in France:

- Fours, Gironde, in the Gironde département
- Fours, Nièvre, in the Nièvre département
- Fours-en-Vexin, in the Eure département
- Fours-St. Laurent, in the Provence-Alpes-Cote D'Azur département

== Other uses ==
- Coxless four: a competitive event in the sport of rowing where a boat is propelled by four rowers, each with one oar
- Four-bar phrases in music in quadruple meter

== See also ==
- Quad (disambiguation)
- Four (disambiguation)
- 4S (disambiguation)
