= Cosmetic (song) =

- Regular edition cover

Single by SID

from the album Dead Stock
- B-side: "Sugu Hata de"
- Released: September 29, 2010
- Genre: J-pop; funk
- Length: 12:16
- Label: Ki/oon Records
- Songwriters: Mao, Aki, Shinji

SID singles chronology
"Rain" (2010)	"Cosmetic" (2010)	"Ranbu no Melody" (2010)

"Cosmetic" (stylized as cosmetic) is a single by Japanese rock band SID, released on September 29, 2010, by Ki/oon Records. The song was included on the album Dead Stock and the compilation Sid All Singles Best.

== Promotion and release ==
Details of the single, such as cover art, composers and tracks, were revealed in early September 2010. A part of the song began to be distributed on the Recochoku Chaku-Uta (R) smartphone app on September 4, and ranked first in the daily rankings, being the band's third consecutive single to do so. A day earlier, the app had released the song's lyrics. On September 22, they published the entire version, at the same time DAM Karaoke also published it. Downloading on DAM also included a free gift.

"Cosmetic" was officially released on September 29 in three editions: regular edition and limited editions A and B. The regular edition comes with the CD with three tracks ("Cosmetic", side B "Sugu Hata de" and a live version of "Memai") only, and limited editions include a bonus DVD, different for edition A or B. On the day of release, they announced the follow-up single: "Ranbu no Melody" and a few days later, a performance in the Tokyo Dome stadium.

== Musical style and themes ==
The title track was composed by guitarist Shinji and the B-side "Sugu Hata de" by bassist Aki. The song is about complicated love relationships between adults. Vocalist Mao told What's In? magazine that the theme is "curveball" (an expression). Guitarist Shinji added that the key word "poison" is also part of the theme. CD Journal website described it as a pop song with a touch of funk.

== Commercial performance ==
"Cosmetic" reached third place on weekly Oricon Albums Chart and stayed on chart for eight weeks. On Tower Records' Japanese Rock & Pop Singles chart, it ranked second place.

== Track listing ==
All lyrics are written by Mao.

No.	Title	Music	Length
1.	"Cosmetic"	Shinji	3:22
2.	"Sugu Hata de" (すぐ傍で)	Aki	4:24
3.	"Memai" (Live from 『Ichiban Suki na Basho 2010』)	Aki	4:29
Total length:			12:16

== Personnel ==
- Mao – vocals
- Shinji – guitar
- Aki – bass
- Yūya – drums
