= Sleep (Sid song) =

- Regular edition cover

Single by SID

from the album Dead Stock
- B-side: "Utahime"
- Released: March 3, 2010
- Genre: Pop rock
- Length: 13:32
- Label: Ki/oon Music
- Songwriters: Mao, Aki

SID singles chronology
"one way" (2009)	"Sleep" (2010)	"Rain" (2010)

"Sleep" is a single by Japanese rock band Sid, released on March 3, 2010, by Ki/oon Music. The song was featured as soundtrack for Nippon TV show Sukkiri!!. It is the group's first romantic ballad single since "Namida no Ondo" (2007).

It was released in three editions. The two limited editions, A and B, include a DVD with the music video for the title track and footage of "Aikagi" at a concert of Hikari tour. The footage differs between limited editions A and B. The regular edition only has the three-track CD.

== Promotion and release ==
The single was announced in December 2009, shortly after the release of the previous single "one way". It was also announced two exclusive shows for the fan club with specific demands. About a month before its release, the song's lyrics were leaked onto the internet on lyrics websites.

== Musical style and reception ==
"Sleep" was described as a love song of sadness and anguish. Tower Records described the song as "vividly portraying the anguished feelings of love [...]" and praised the melody and vocals of Mao. Regarding the B-side "Utahime", CD Journal company said it is a dance-rock song with a "quiet and moving" charm.

== Commercial performance ==
The single peaked at number two on weekly Oricon Albums Chart and stayed on chart for seven weeks. It sold 56,135 copies while on the chart, becoming the band's fifth best-selling single, according to the Oricon sales rankings. On Tower Records' Japanese Rock and Pop Singles chart, it peaked at number four, as well as on Billboard Japan Hot 100.

Sleep ranked first place in the lyrics view rankings on Recochoku's Chaku-Uta(R) mobile app.

== Tracklist ==
All lyrics are written by Mao.

No.	Title	Music	Length
1.	"Sleep"	Aki	4:41
2.	"Utahime" (歌姫)	Shinji	3:14
3.	"Aikagi" (合鍵, Live from SID TOUR 2009 hikari)	Aki	5:35
Total length:			13:32

== Personnel ==
- Mao – vocals
- Shinji – guitar
- Aki – bass
- Yūya – drums
