= M&W (album) =

- Limited edition B cover

Studio album by SID
- Released: August 1, 2012
- Genre: J-pop
- Length: 43:35
- Language: Japanese
- Label: Ki/oon Music

SID chronology
Dead Stock (2011)	M&W (2012)	Outsider (2014)

Singles from M&W
- 1. "Itsuka" Released: September 28, 2011; 2. "Fuyu no Bench" Released: December 28, 2011; 3. "Nokoriga" Released: May 2, 2012; 4. "S" Released: May 9, 2012

M&W is the seventh studio album by Japanese rock band SID, released on August 1, 2012, through Ki/oon Records.

The singles in the album are "Itsuka" (いつか), theme song of television program Countdown TV, "Fuyu no Bench" (冬のベンチ), "Nokoriga" (残り香), theme song of television program Sukkiri! and "S", theme of Sadako 3D film. The title means Men&Women and expresses the relationship between the two. The website CD Journal, in a review of the album, commented that SID leans more towards J-pop than visual kei in this recording.

== Promotion and release ==
In May 2012, the singles "Nokoriga" and "S" were released, the later used as theme song for the film Sadako 3D. A commercial of M&W showed the character Sadako entering a fan's room and a program about the film was broadcast on May 11 on Nico Nico Douga, featuring Sid, Sadako and Sadako 3D's producers.

In early June, the album's release date was announced: August 1. It was released in three editions, the regular and limited editions A and B, these with a bonus DVD.

On June 1, two months before the album was released, SID embarked on the Tour 2012 M&W preview, in preparation for the album, featuring 19 shows in 13 locations. On September 1, they began the main tour, Tour 2012 M&W, which featured 42 shows and a cumulative audience of 100,000 people. In November, an extra leg of the tour called Tour 2012 M&W Extra had SID's first two performances in Taiwan, which was originally going to be one, but a second show was added due to high demand. A total of 2600 people attended the two shows, while tickets sold out within ten minutes, and around 400 fans met Sid at the airport.

== Commercial performance ==
M&W reached number three on Oricon Albums Chart and remained on chart for nine weeks. On Taiwan's G-Music J-POP/K-POP chart, it reached number one, while reaching number ten in the overall ranking.

"Nokoriga" ranked 11th on Billboard Japan, while "S" debuted at 4th place.

== Track listing ==
All lyrics are written by Mao.

Regular edition
No.	Title	Music	Length
1.	"Konagona" (コナゴナ)	Shinji	4:15
2.	"Ghost Apartment" (ゴーストアパートメント)	Aki	3:28
3.	"Fuyu no Bench" (冬のベンチ)	Yūya	5:03
4.	"Ito" (糸)	Aki	4:14
5.	"Café de Bossa"	Yuuya	4:10
6.	"S"	Aki	3:29
7.	"MOM"	Shinji	3:35
8.	"Itsuka" (いつか)	Shinji	4:50
9.	"Dress Code" (ドレスコード)	Aki	2:59
10.	"gossip!!"	Aki	3:57
11.	"Nokoriga" (残り香)	Yūya	5:10
Total length:			45:15

Limited edition A bonus tracks
No.	Title	Length
1.	"DVD TOUR 2012 『M&W』 Preview live ver. A" (特典DVD TOUR 2012 『M&W』previewライブ映像Ver. A)

Limited edition B bonus tracks
No.	Title	Length
1.	"DVD TOUR 2012 『M&W』 Preview live ver. B" (初回特典DVD TOUR 2012 『M&W』previewライブ映像Ver. B)

== Personnel ==
- Mao – vocals
- Shinji – guitar
- Aki – bass
- Yūya – drums
