= Nokoriga =

- Regular edition cover

Single by SID

from the album M&W
- Language: Japanese
- B-side: "Graduation"
- Released: May 2, 2012
- Length: 14:19
- Label: Ki/oon Records
- Composers: Yuya; Aki (B-side)
- Lyricist: Mao

SID singles chronology
"Fuyu no Bench" (2011)	"Nokoriga" (2012)	"S" (2012)

Music video
- "Nokoriga" on YouTube

"Nokoriga" (残り香) is a single by Japanese rock band SID, released on May 2, 2012, by Ki/oon and included on the album M&W. It was theme song for Nippon TV's program Sukkiri!!!.

== Promotion and release ==
Sid held an exclusive fan club concert at Zepp Tokyo on March 16, 2012, to perform live their new single "Nokoriga" for the first time. The performance, which was recorded, was announced about two weeks in advance.

The single was released in three editions: one regular and two limited editions. The regular edition contains the CD with the title track, the B-side “Graduation”, and a live recording of "Higasa", performed at the Jack In The Box 2011 event. The limited editions come with a DVD in addition to the CD, with a recording that differs between editions A and B.

== Composition and themes ==
“Nokoriga” was composed by drummer Yuya, while the B-side "Graduation" was composed by Aki. “Nokoriga” uses the theme of cherry blossoms as an analogy for farewell and separation. CD Journal added that it captures the atmosphere of spring.

== Commercial performance ==
It reached fifth place on weekly Oricon Albums Chart and remained on chart for five weeks. It reached ninth place on Tower Records' Japanese rock and pop singles chart. It is the band's 15th best-selling single, according to Oricon.

== Track listing ==
All lyrics are written by Mao.

No.	Title	Music	Length
1.	"Nokoriga" (残り香)	Yuya	5:11
2.	"Graduation"	Aki	3:47
3.	"Higasa" (日傘; Live from JACK IN THE BOX 2011)	Shinji	5:21
Total length:			14:19

== Personnel ==
- Mao – vocals
- Shinji – guitar
- Aki – bass
- Yūya – drums
