= Recurve =

Recurve may refer to any of several things named for the notion of curving back:

- Recurve (landform), the hook at the tip of a coastal spit
- Recurve bow, a type of bow used in archery
- A knife blade shape with a concave portion, often exemplified by a kukri

== See also ==
- Reverse curve
- S Curve (disambiguation)
