= ES engine =

ES engine may refer to:

- V6 ESL engine, an automotive engine developed by PSA Group (Peugeot and Citroën) and Renault
- Engine for Lexus ES, a car series
- ES engine, a type of Honda E engine
- JavaScript engine, web browser scripting engine
- Engine for OpenGL ES

== See also ==
- ES (disambiguation)
