= 's =

's may refer to:

- 's, an ending used to form the possessive of English nouns and noun phrases
- 's, a contraction of the English words is and has
- 's, a form of the English plural ending, written after single letters and in some other instances
  - Greengrocers' apostrophes, a non-standard manner to form noun plurals
- 's, a contraction of the old Dutch genitive article des, appearing in names such as 's-Hertogenbosch

== See also ==
- All pages beginning with 's
- All pages beginning with 'S
- Apostrophe
- -s (disambiguation)
- S (disambiguation)
