= Leahead =

Electric car sub brand by GAC Toyota

- Native name: 领志
- Type: Automotive marque
- Industry: Automotive
- Founded: 2014; 12 years ago
- Defunct: 2018
- Headquarters: Guangzhou, China
- Area served: China
- Products: Electric automobiles
- Parent: GAC Toyota
- Website: http://www.leahead.com

Leahead (LEE-ə-HED) was an electric car sub brand by GAC Toyota, a joint venture between GAC Group and Toyota Motor Corporation, founded in 2014.

== History ==
In 2013, the Sino-Japanese joint venture GAC Toyota announced a plan to introduce a new brand electric cars Leahead to the domestic Chinese market. Its announcement was the Ranz Concept crossover prototype presented at the Shanghai Auto Show. Leahead's next study was the urban hatchback i1 EV Concept presented in April 2015 at the Beijing Auto Show, closer in form to the future first production model.

The series variant Leahead i1 was presented in November 2015, being a twin design to the second generation Toyota Yaris produced by GAC Toyota on the local Chinese market in 2008 –2013. The car remained the only design offered under the Leahead brand and did not go into mass production except for a trial copy. The company retained a marginal position in the alliance in favor of GAC Toyota focusing on offering co-built Electric Cars as part of the Japanese company's local portfolio from 2018.

== Products ==
=== i1 ===
The i1 was an electric supermini hatchback based on the 5-door second generation Toyota Vitz and had a range of about 128 kilometres (80 mi). It has a 22 kWh battery and the motor delivers up to 70 kilowatts (95 hp).

The i1 was sold for the 2015-2016 model years.

In 2018, Leahead i1s were recalled for replacing their defective Takata airbags.

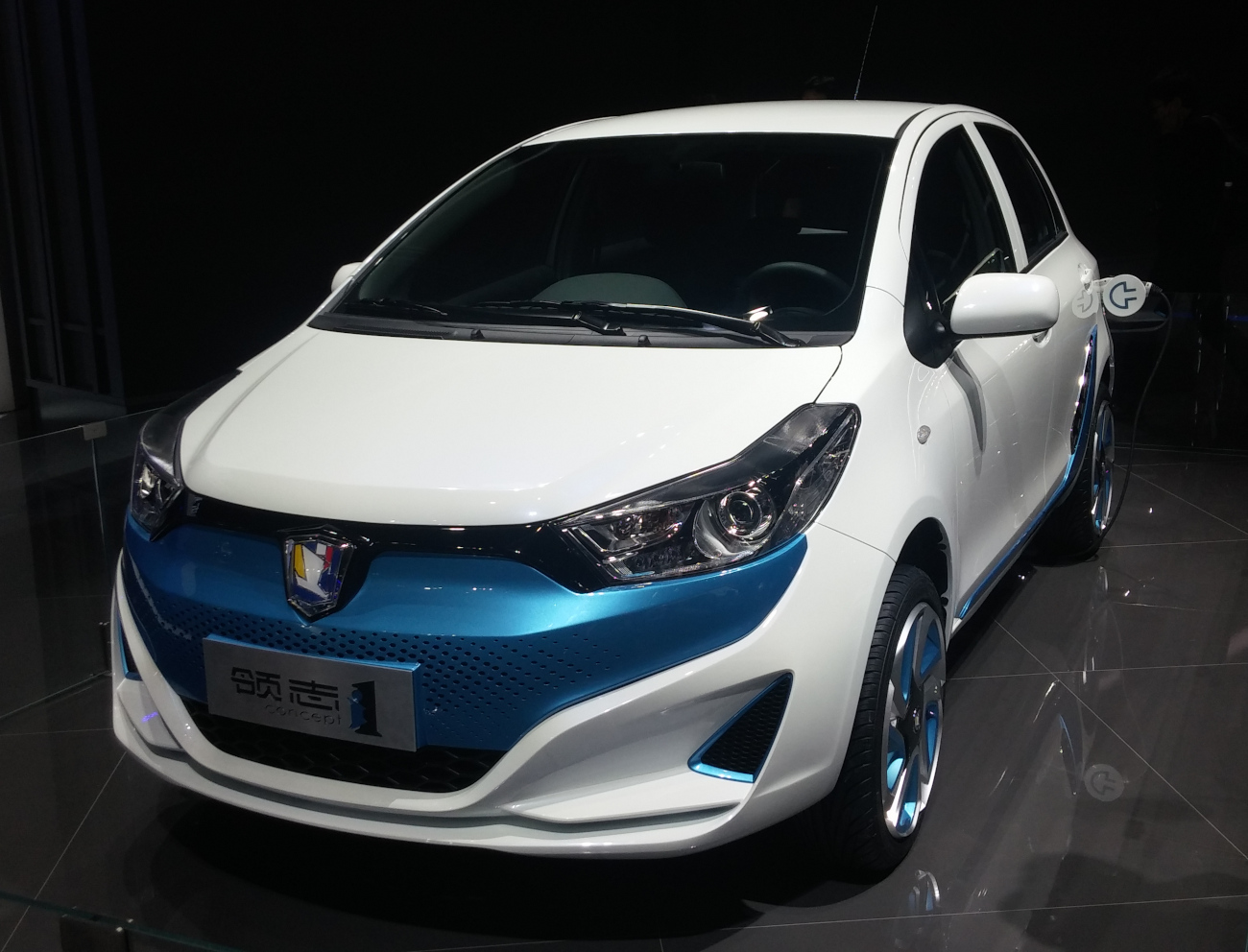
Leahead i1 Concept

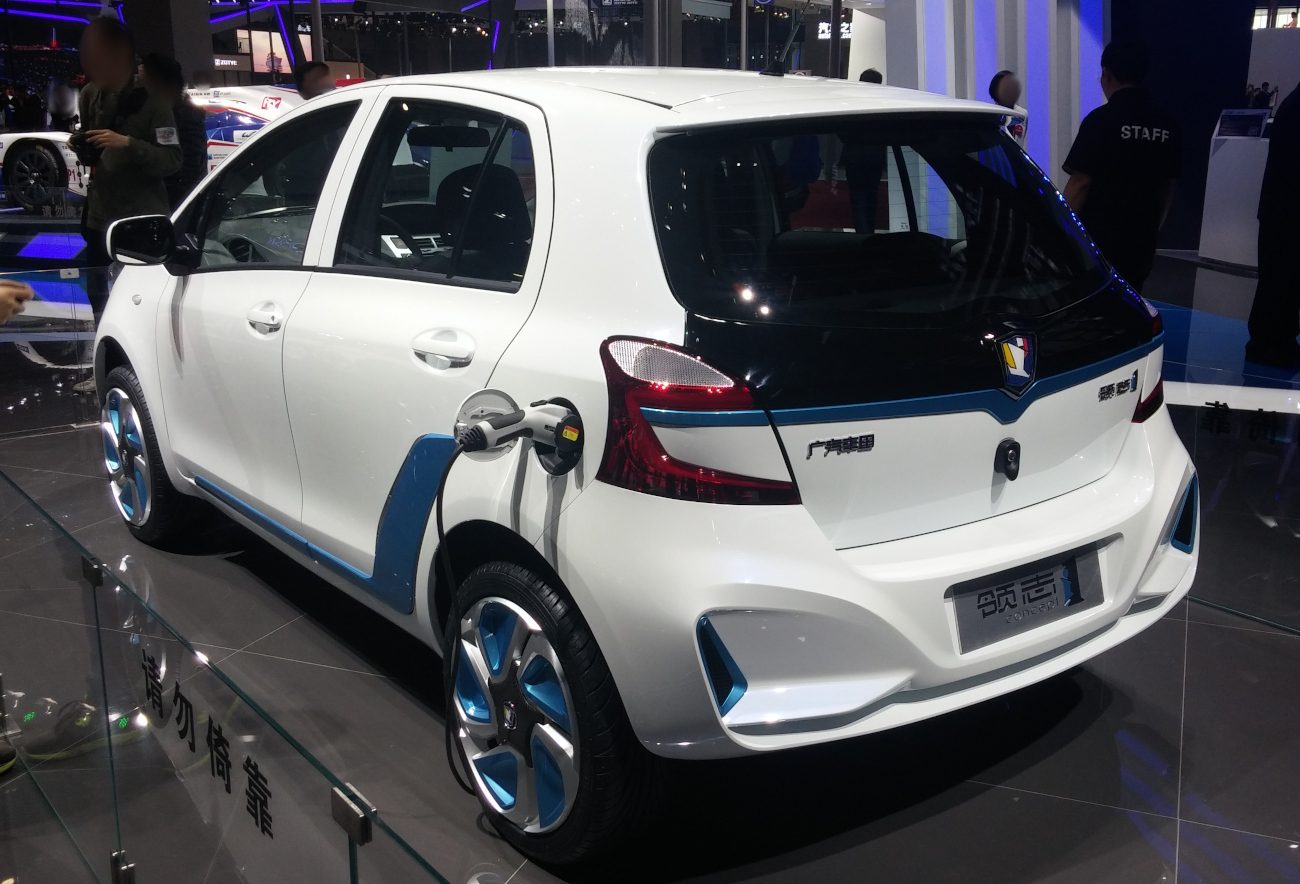
Leahead i1 Concept

=== iA5 ===
The iA5 was an electric compact sedan based on GAC New Energy's Aion S, with a redesigned front and rear different from the Aion S.

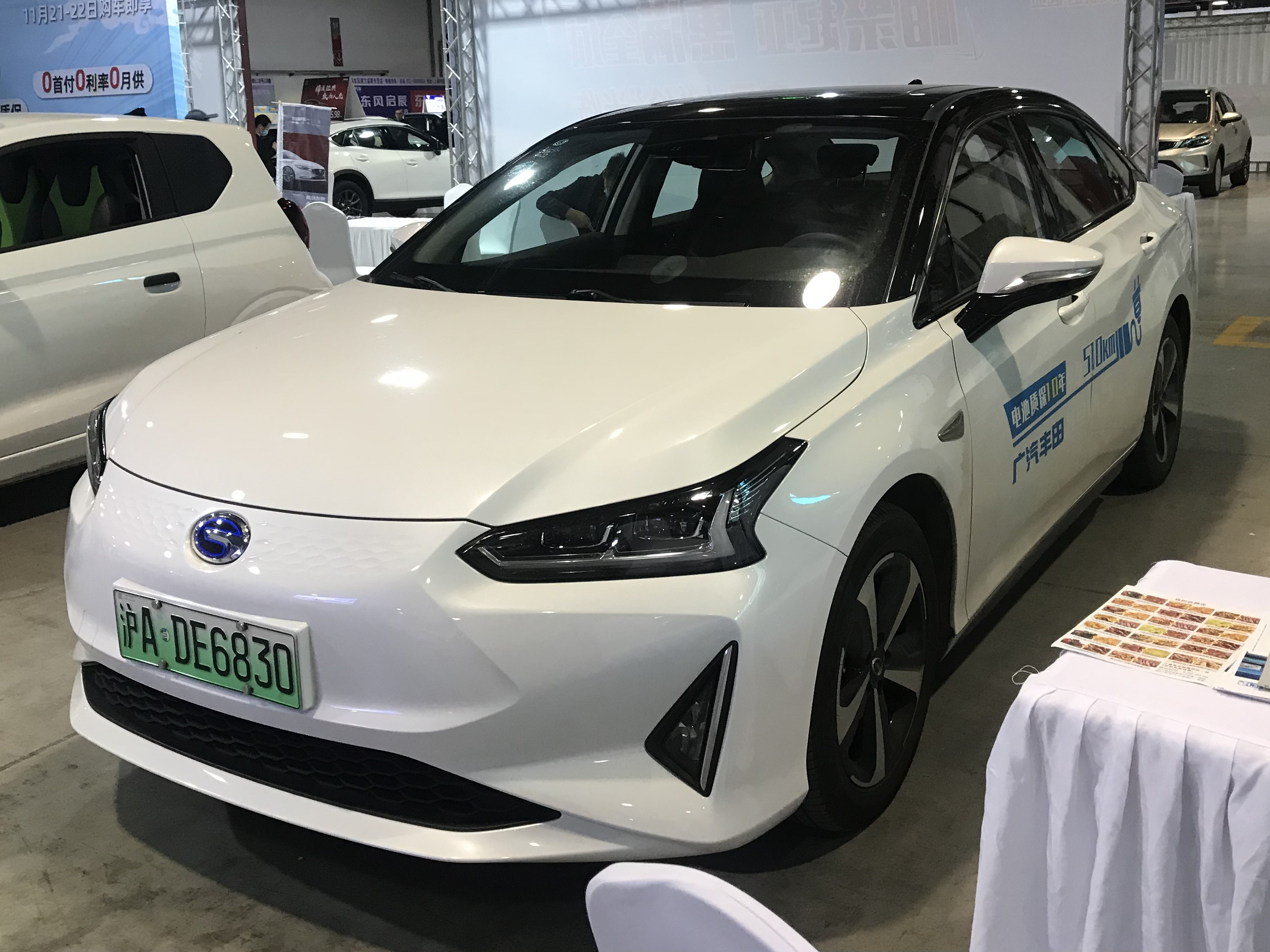
Leahead iA5 (front, left side)

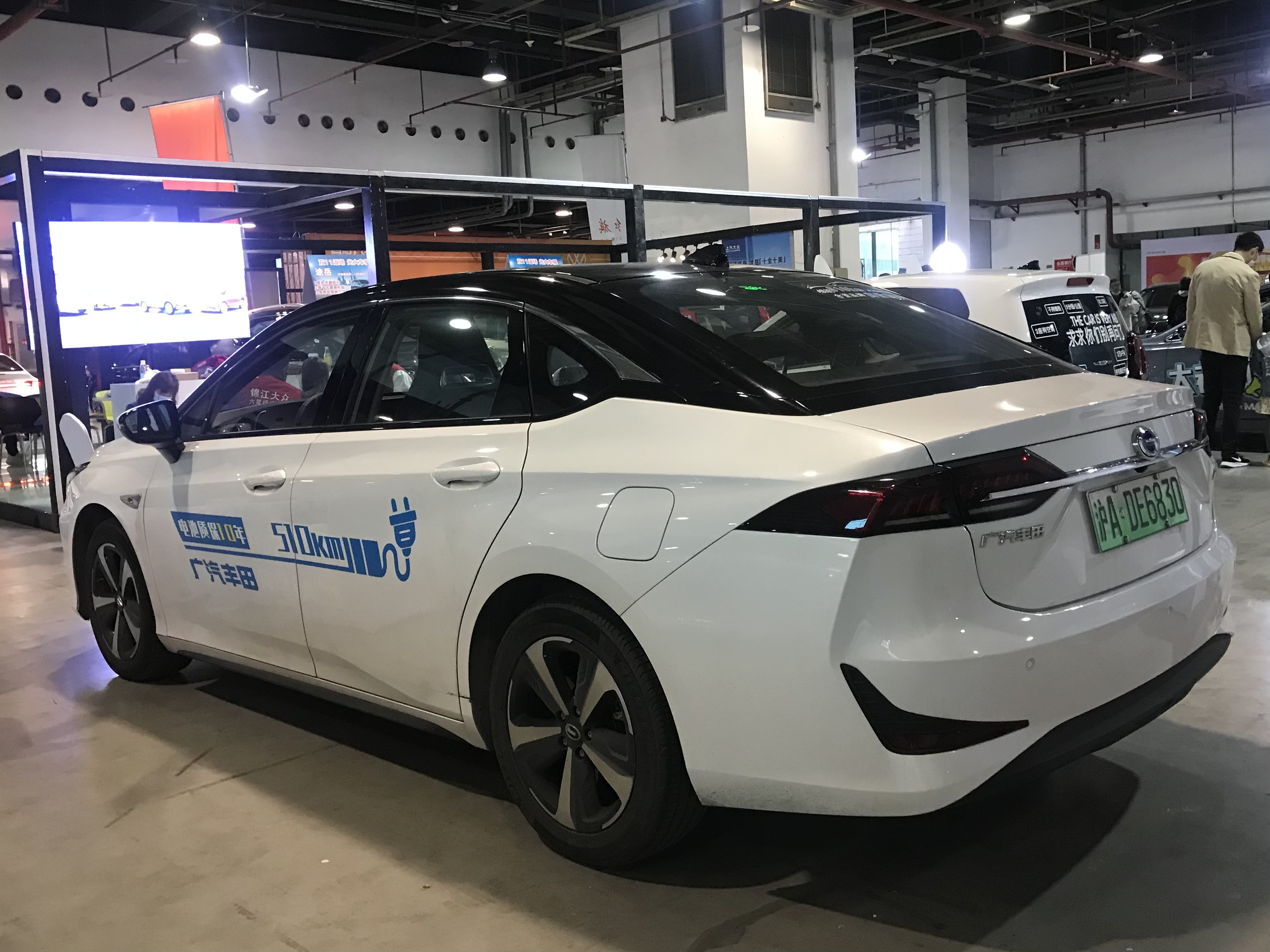
Leahead iA5 (rear)

=== iX4 ===
The iX4 was an electric compact crossover SUV based on the facelifted electric Trumpchi GS4 and was revealed at the 2018 Chengdu Motor Show. It was also sold as the Mitsubishi Eupheme Qizhi, Honda Everus Shirui, and Fiat Yuejie, though the iX4 was a pure EV while the others were plug-in hybrid electric vehicles.

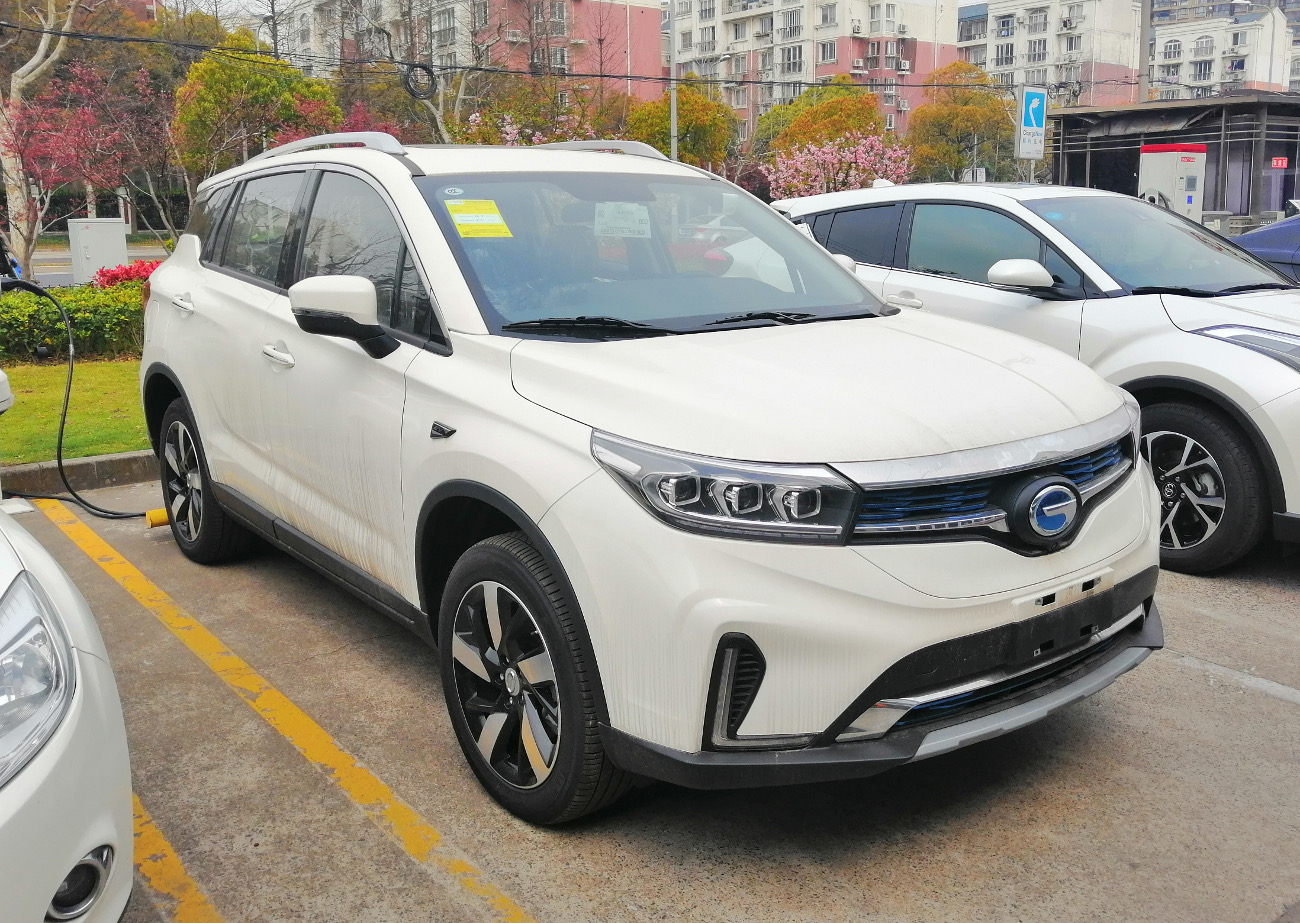
Leahead iX4 (front, left side)

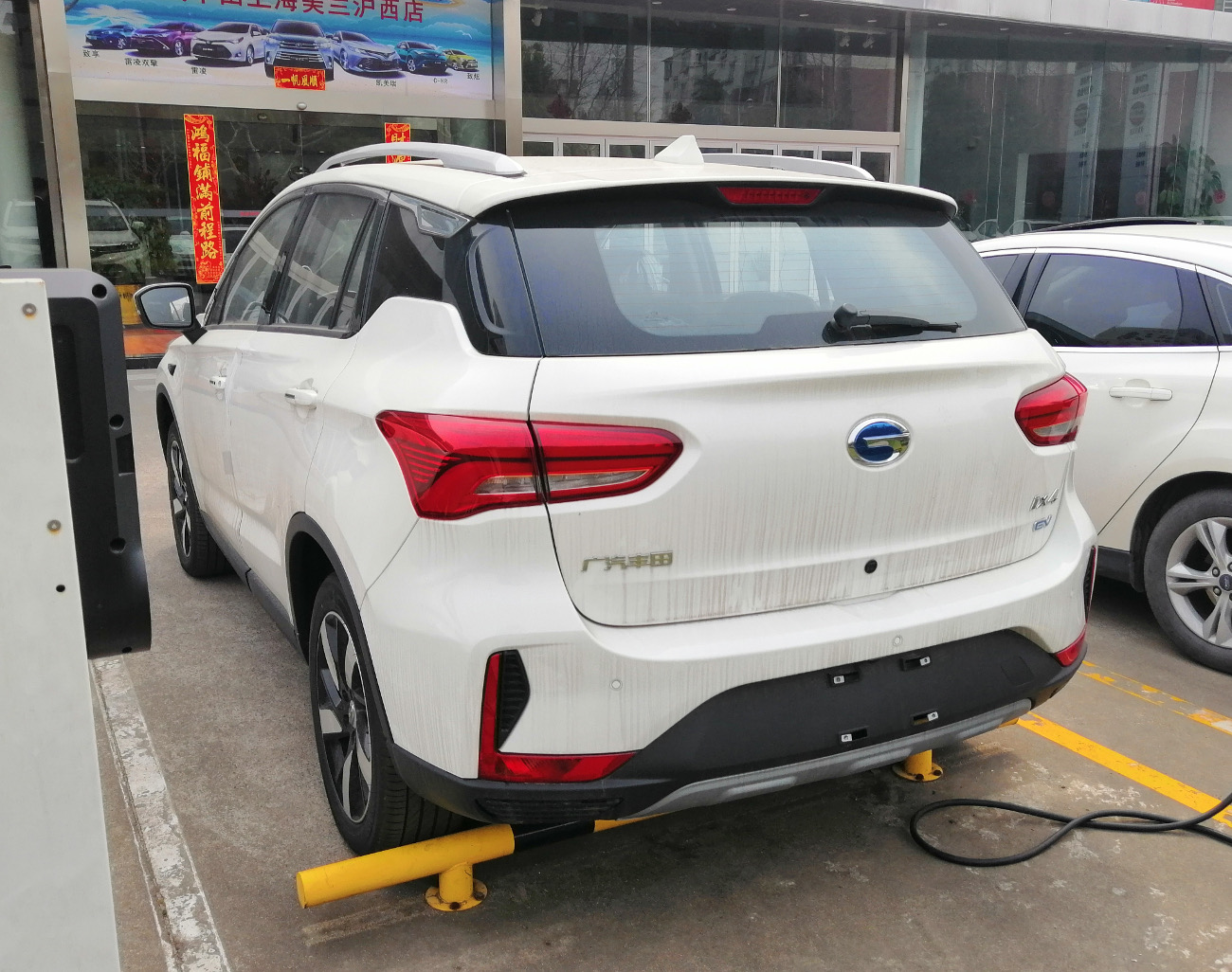
Leahead iX4 (rear)

== See also ==
- Aion
- Everus
