= Rain (Sid song) =

Single by SID

from the album Dead Stock
- Released: April 4, 2010 (digital); June 2, 2010 (CD)
- Genre: Rock
- Length: 12:38
- Label: Ki/oon Records
- Songwriters: Mao, Yūya

SID singles chronology
"Sleep" (2010)	"Rain" (2010)	"Cosmetic" (2010)

Music video
- "Rain" on YouTube

"Rain" (レイン) is a single by Japanese visual kei rock band Sid, released digitally on April 4, 2010, and on CD on June 2 by Ki/oon Records. It was released in three editions: the regular edition and the limited editions A and B, which includes a DVD. "Rain" is one of the opening theme songs of Fullmetal Alchemist: Brotherhood.

== Background and release ==
"Rain" premiered digitally on April 4, 2010, at the same time it appeared in the fifth season of Fullmetal Alchemist: Brotherhood. It was chosen as the opening theme a year after another Sid song, "Uso", appeared in the anime. "Rain" also appeared on the television shows Hey!Hey!Hey, Music Station and Music Japan. The single was released on CD two months later, on June 2. Two days after the CD release, Sid announced an event to meet fans who had purchased it, visiting four Japanese cities in two days. On July 31, the ongoing Ichiban Suki na Basho tour featured a date at Saitama Super Arena with an estimated audience of 30,000 people.

With the lyrics written by vocalist Mao, he mentioned that he sought to write simple and catchy lyrics. The title song was composed by drummer Yūya and the b-side tracks "Cut" and "Chapter 1" were written by bassist Aki. "Chapter 1" had already been released as a single in 2005, however a recording of the song in the 2010 Ichiban Suki na Basho tour was included in "Rain".

In two surveys about which anime music people prefer to listen to on a rainy day, Anime! Anime! ranked "Rain" on second place and RecoChoku led to the first place.

CD Journal noted that the single is a "medium rock with a Japanese-style sound that focuses on the emotional theme of rain" and "stands out for its overwhelming pop sense and assured vocal sense".

== Commercial performance ==
"Rain" reached number two on weekly Oricon Singles Chart and stayed on chart for 12 weeks. In the daily charts, it led for two consecutive days and reached number one on Billboard Japan Hot 100 and RecoChoku charts.

It was certified platinum by RIAJ in 2014 for selling more than 250,000 digital copies. According to Oricon, it was the 85th best-selling single of 2010 in Japan.

== Tracks ==
All lyrics are written by Mao.

No.	Title	Music	Length
1.	"Rain" (レイン)	Yūya	4:16
2.	"Cut"	Aki	3:40
3.	"Chapter 1" (Live from Ichiban Suki na Basho 2010)	Aki	4:42
Total length:			12:38

== Personnel ==
- Mao – vocal
- Shinji – guitar
- Aki – bass
- Yūya – drums
