= S (disambiguation) =

S is the nineteenth letter of the English alphabet.

S may also refer to:

- s, seconds, in an amount of time

== Language and linguistics ==
- Long s (ſ), a form of the lower-case letter s formerly used where "s" occurred in the middle or at the beginning of a word
- s, the International Phonetic Alphabet symbol for a voiceless alveolar sibilant sound
- S, the subject of an intransitive verb
- Ѕ, the Cyrillic letter Dze
- Տ, the Armenian letter tyun
- Ⴝ, the Georgian Asomtavruli letter ch'ari

== Transportation and places ==
- South, a cardinal direction, usually shown at the bottom of a map or compass
- S postcode area, England, centered around Sheffield
- S, the designation letter for Sierra Time Zone, the military time zone for UTC−06:00

=== Trains ===
- S (New York City Subway service), one of the three services:
  - Franklin Avenue Shuttle
  - 42nd Street Shuttle (also called the Grand Central/Times Square Shuttle) (internally referred to as the 0)
  - Rockaway Park Shuttle (also called Rockaway Shuttle) (internally referred to as the H)
- Toei Shinjuku Line, a subway service operated by the Tokyo Metropolitan Bureau of Transportation (Toei), labeled
- Sennichimae Line, a subway service operated by the Osaka Metro, labeled
- , the official West Japan Railway Company service symbol for the Kansai Airport Line
- Shrirangapattana railway station (Indian Railways station code: S), Karnataka, India
- Karjat railway station (Mumbai Suburban Railway station code: S), Maharastra, India

=== Automobiles ===
- Bojonegoro, Mojokerto, Tuban, Lamongan and Jombang (vehicle registration prefix S)

==== Production models ====
- Aion S, a Chinese electric compact executive sedan
- Jaguar S-Type (1963), a British sports saloon
- Jaguar S-Type (1999), a British executive saloon
- Mercedes-Benz S-Class, a German full-size luxury car series
- Mini Cooper S, a British hot hatch
- Neta S, a Chinese electric sedan
- Tesla Model S, an American electric executive sedan

==== Prototypes and concepts ====
- Sony Vision-S, a Japanese mid-size electric concept sedan

==== Series and trims ====
- Acura Type-S, a range of Japanese performance vehicles
- Audi S, a range of German performance vehicles
- Honda S series, series of Japanese sports cars
- Jaguar S, a range of British performance vehicles
- Saviem S, a range of French medium-duty cab-over trucks

== Mathematics and logic ==
- Integral symbol (∫), used in mathematics to denote integrals and antiderivatives
- S combinator in combinatory logic
- Sphere
- S (set theory), an axiomatic set theory
- s(n), the aliquot sum of an integer n

== Science and technology ==
=== Physics, chemistry, and telecommunications ===
- Sulfur, symbol S, a chemical element
- S, the symbol for entropy
- S, a non-SI unit used to designate molecule size named after the Svedberg sedimentation coefficient
- (S), a label that denotes one of two chiral center configurations in the R/S system
- s, one of the Mandelstam variables, the square of the invariant mass
- Siemens (unit), the SI derived unit of electric conductance
- S-block of the periodic table, which includes alkali metals, alkaline earth metals, and hydrogen and helium
- Spin (physics)
- s, an abbreviation for solid
- S-matrix for how a particle physics system works under a scattering process. This is a distinct concept from scattering parameters, below, which may also be referred to as an S-matrix in the context of radio frequency transmissions.
- Scattering parameters as S-matrix or S-parameters for how an electrical network behaves at some frequency, used e.g. with radio transmission
- S band, a band of radio which ranges from 2 to 4 GHz

=== Biology and medicine ===
- Serine, a standard amino acid abbreviated as Ser or S
- ATC code S Sensory organs, a section of the Anatomical Therapeutic Chemical Classification System
- S phase or synthesis phase, a period in the cell cycle during interphase

=== Electronics and computing ===
- Nikon S-mount, type of interchangeable lens mount used by a series of Nikon 35 mm rangefinder cameras
- Nikon S, a 34 mm rangefinder film camera
- Nikon Pronea S, an APS film camera made by Nikon
- Samsung Galaxy S (2010 smartphone), the first flagship smartphone of the Samsung Galaxy S series
- S (programming language), an environment for statistical computing and graphics
- <s>, the opening tag for the HTML element denoting information that is "no longer accurate or no longer relevant", usually rendered as ~~strike-through text~~
- S record or SREC, a file format with an ASCII representation of Binary data

== People ==
- S, the pen name of Percy Bysshe Shelley
- "S.", the nickname for Solomon Shereshevsky (1886-1958), a Russian journalist, mnemonist, and synesthete notable for his unusual memory abilities

== Arts and entertainment ==
=== Books ===
- S. (Dorst novel), written by Doug Dorst based on story by J.J. Abrams
- S. (Updike novel), part of The Scarlet Letter trilogy
- S (novel series), a 2005-2006 light novel series

=== Music ===
- S, the stage name of singer-songwriter and guitarist Jenn Champion
- S (group), a short-lived South Korean music group active in 2003 and 2014
- S, a 2001 EP by Japanese musical duo NaNa
- S (EP), a 2013 EP by American singer SZA
- Numbering of Franz Liszt's works according to Humphrey Searle's catalogue
- "S" (song), by Japanese band Sid

=== Television ===
- S, the production code for the 1965 Doctor Who serial The Time Meddler

=== Comics ===
- S, the protagonist of Heavy Liquid

== Sports ==
- Safety (gridiron football position), a player role in American and Canadian football, a kind of defensive back
- Strike (baseball), when the ball passes through the batter's strike zone

== Currency ==
- s, shilling (British coin), a denomination of sterling coinage worth 0.05 £, or, pre-decimal, 12 d
- S, old Israeli shekel, used 1980–1985

== Other uses ==
- S by Shakira, the first woman's fragrance by Colombian singer songwriter Shakira
- A party label for the Swedish Social Democratic Party
- Cool S, a graffiti sign
- S, the prefix before a "Sawyer number" denoting an entry in Anglo-Saxon Charters: an Annotated List and Bibliography

== See also ==
- 's (disambiguation)
- -s (disambiguation)
- S class (disambiguation)
- S Curve (disambiguation)
- Split S
