= One way (Sid song) =

- Regular edition cover

Single by SID

from the album Dead Stock
- B-side: "Kaitō Neon"
- Released: November 11, 2009
- Genre: J-pop
- Length: 11:24
- Label: Ki/oon Records
- Songwriters: Mao, Aki

SID singles chronology
"Uso" (2009)	"One way" (2009)	"Sleep" (2010)

"One way" is a single by Japanese rock band Sid, released on November 11, 2009, by Ki/oon Music. The song was used as the ending theme song of Fuji TV television series Uchikuru!. It was released in three editions. The two limited editions include a DVD with the music video for the title track and a live footage of "Doyōbi no Onna" on Hikari tour. The footage differs between the limited edition A and B. The regular edition only has the three-track CD.

== Promotion and release ==
"One way" was released as single on November 11, 2009. Two days later, the band held a special event on Sony Music Japan's website lasting 36 hours, consisting of displaying for free the chorus of the music video, messages from the members and other promotional contents. The weekend following the release, the band appeared on several television programs, such as NHK's Music Japan, TV Asahi's Music Station, among others. Fans who pre-downloaded the song on Recochoku's mobile app, Chaku-uta, would be the only ones who could apply for tickets for the band's upcoming tour, which was set to start in March.

== Musical style and themes ==
"One way" was composed by Aki, while the B-side "Kaitō Neon" was composed by Shinji, and all lyrics were written by vocalist Mao as usual.

Barks website considered it a "fast and upbeat track that maintains the strong melody typical of Sid [...] great for playing live", noting that it is completely different from the previous single "Uso". CD Journal company described "One Way" as "a soft rock song with a sense of speed", also praising its sound when played live. Regarding "Kaitō Neon", it described it as a rockabilly music where "the sound of the piano gives off an atmosphere of mystery". Both mentioned how the single's theme is different from the band's previous singles, which generally spoke about love. "One way" expresses the desire and determination to move forward and move towards the future and their dreams. Barks praised Mao's lyrics in this regard.

== Commercial performance ==
The single peaked at number three on weekly Oricon Albums Chart and stayed on chart for ten weeks. It sold 54,683 copies while on the chart, becoming the band's sixth best-selling single. On Tower Records' Japanese Rock and Pop Singles chart, it debuted at number five. It also peaked at number five on Billboard Japan Hot 100.

On the day of its release, the apps Uta Net and Peps! Music classified the song's lyrics as the most viewed of the moment and Recochoku's Chaku-uta app ranked it in third place.

== Track listing ==
No.	Title	Music	Producer	Length
1.	"One way"	Aki	Sid	3:32
2.	"Kaitō Neon" (怪盗ネオン)	Shinji	Sid and Akira Nishihira	3:51
3.	"Doyōbi no Onna" (土曜日の女, Live from SID TOUR 2009 hikari)	Aki	Sid and Sakura	4:00
Total length:				11:24

== Personnel ==
- Mao – vocals
- Shinji – guitar
- Aki – bass
- Yūya – drums
