= S (song) =

- Regular edition cover

Single by SID

from the album M&W
- Language: Japanese
- Released: May 9, 2012
- Genre: Hard rock
- Length: 10:58
- Label: Ki/oon Records
- Songwriters: Mao, Aki, Shinji

SID singles chronology
"Nokoriga" (2012)	"S" (2012)	"V.I.P" (2012)

Music video
- "S" on YouTube

"S" is a single by Japanese rock band SID, released on May 9, 2012, by Ki/oon Music and is the theme song for the film Sadako 3D. "S", a hard rock song, was included on the album M&W and also on Oricon chart top 1 Sid 10th Anniversary Best.

== Promotion and release ==
At a Sid's concert on March 16, 2012, at Zepp Tokyo, "S" was played for the first time and announced as the new single and as soundtrack for the film Sadako 3D. A person playing the character Sadako suddenly appeared on stage. On April 18, the song and its music video were released on Sony's YouTube channel. The music video is in black and white and features the members performing the song, and was recorded almost in one take.

"S" was released on May 9 in three editions, just two weeks after the previous single, "Nokoriga". The regular edition comes only with the CD of three audio tracks ("S", "Rainy Day" and "Utahime" live) and the limited A and B editions come with a DVD, containing the music video for "S" and the live footage of "Utahime", which is different between the limited A and B editions. On May 11, Sid appeared on a show broadcast by Nico Nico Douga about the film's release. On the 19th, Sid appeared at the official premiere event for the film. The film's director Tsutomu Hanabusa requested a "strong" song and said at the event that the song perfectly met his expectations.

== Musical style ==
"S" is a hard rock song, composed by bassist Aki, which was written especially to be the film's soundtrack. CD Journal company praised the song's composition, guitars and "roaring" vocals by Mao, who also wrote the lyrics.

== Commercial performance ==
The single peaked at number four on weekly Oricon Albums Chart and stayed on chart for seven weeks. It is the band's 13th best-selling single, according to Oricon ranking. On Tower Records' Japanese Rock and Pop Singles chart, it peaked at number four, as well as on the Billboard Japan Hot 100. The following week, it fell to number 17 on Tower and number 7 on Billboard.

== Track listing ==
All lyrics are written by Mao.

No.	Title	Music	Length
1.	"S"	Aki	3:28
2.	"Rainy day" (レイニーデイ)	Shinji	4:08
3.	"Utahime" (歌姫, Live from「3.16 SHOOTING LIVE」)	Shinji	3:21
Total length:			10:58

== Personnel ==
- Mao – vocals
- Shinji – guitar
- Aki – bass
- Yūya – drums
