= S Curve =

S curve or S-curve may refer to:

- S-curve (art), an S-shaped curve which serves a wide variety of compositional purposes
- S-curve (math), a characteristic S-shaped curve of a sigmoid function
- S-curve corset, an Edwardian corset style
- S-Curve Records, a record company label
- Reverse curve, or "S" curve, in civil engineering

== See also ==
- Recurve (disambiguation)
