= -s =

-s or -es may be:

- in English
  - an ending used to form the regular English plural
  - an ending used to form the third-person singular present indicative of English verbs
- a plural or other inflectional ending in certain other languages such as French, German, etc.
- -s, a suffix sometimes used to convert a parent's name into a surname — see Son § Indications in names § English and Patronymic § Dutch

== See also ==
- 's (disambiguation)
- S (disambiguation)
