= Aion S =

Battery electric compact executive sedan

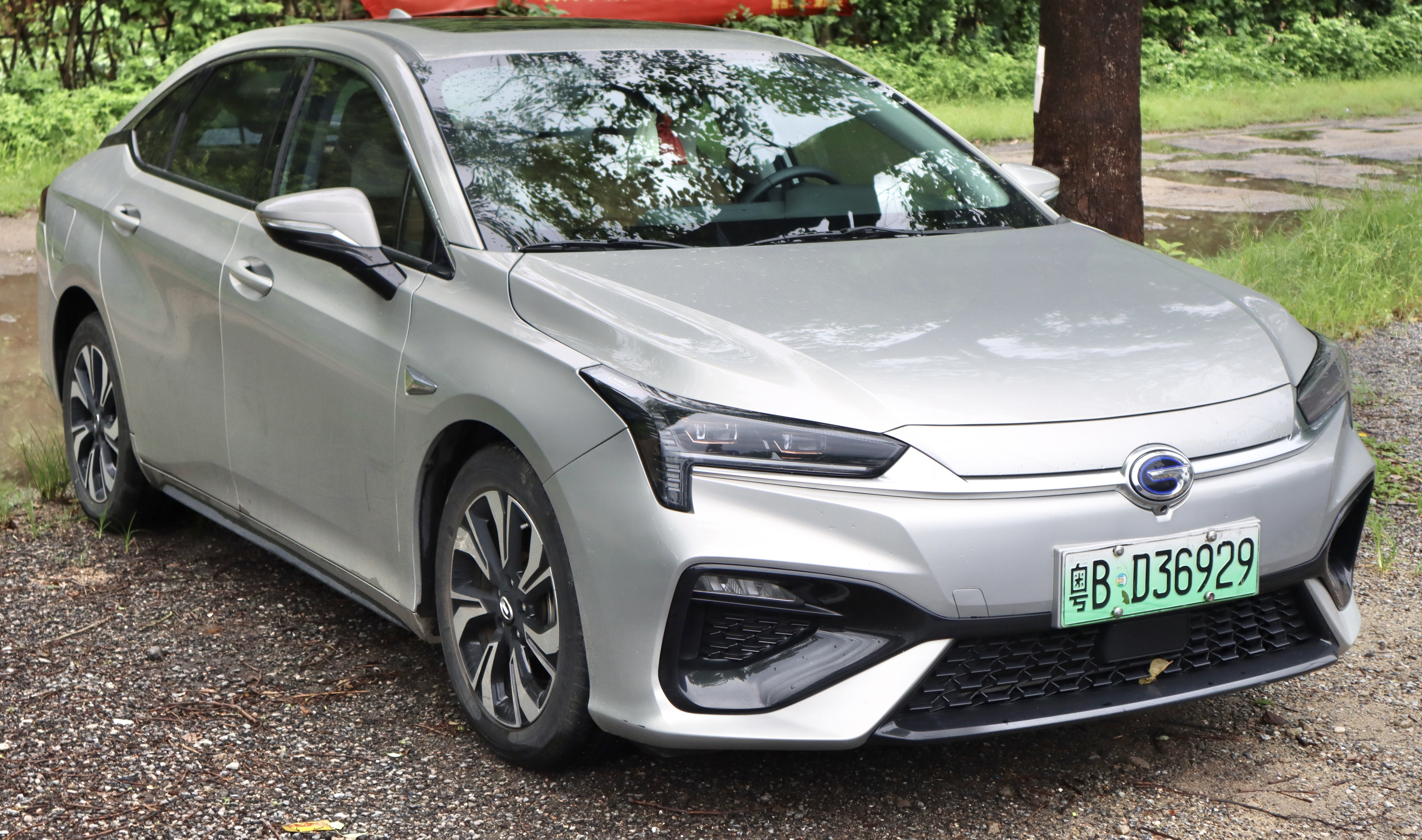

Overview
- Manufacturer: GAC Aion
- Model code: A26 EV (development codename)
- Also called: GAC Toyota/Leahead iA5 (2019–2024); GAC Honda/Everus EA6 (2021–2024); Aion ES (export)
- Production: 2019–present
- Assembly: China: Changsha, Guangzhou and Hangzhou; Thailand: Rayong (Aion Automobile Manufacturing (Thailand))

Body and chassis
- Class: Compact executive car (D)
- Body style: 4-door sedan
- Layout: Front-motor, front-wheel-drive
- Platform: AEP 3.0

Powertrain
- Electric motor: Permanent magnet synchronous motor
- Power output: 100 kW (136 PS; 134 hp); 135 kW (184 PS; 181 hp)
- Transmission: Single speed
- Battery: 48.67 kWh LFP lithium ion; 53 kWh LFP lithium ion; 55 kWh LFP lithium ion; 58.8 kWh CATL lithium ion
- Electric range: 420–510 km (261–317 mi) (CLTC)

Dimensions
- Wheelbase: 2,750 mm (108.3 in)
- Length: 4,768 mm (187.7 in)
- Width: 1,880 mm (74.0 in)
- Height: 1,530–1,545 mm (60.2–60.8 in)
- Curb weight: 1,610–1,630 kg (3,549–3,594 lb)

The Aion S is a battery electric compact executive car produced by GAC Aion. It was revealed at Auto Guangzhou of 2018. A new variant, the Aion S Plus, was shown in 2021. Another new variant, the Aion S Max, went on sale in 2023.

== Overview ==
The Aion S was unveiled at Auto Guangzhou in November 2018. It went on pre-sale in March 2019 and officially on sale in May 2019. It was GAC New Energy's first car under the Aion brand.

The first models to launch are the higher trim levels, featuring a 184 hp (137 kW; 187 PS) and 300 N⋅m (221 lb⋅ft) electric motor and a NEDC range of 510 kilometres (317 mi).

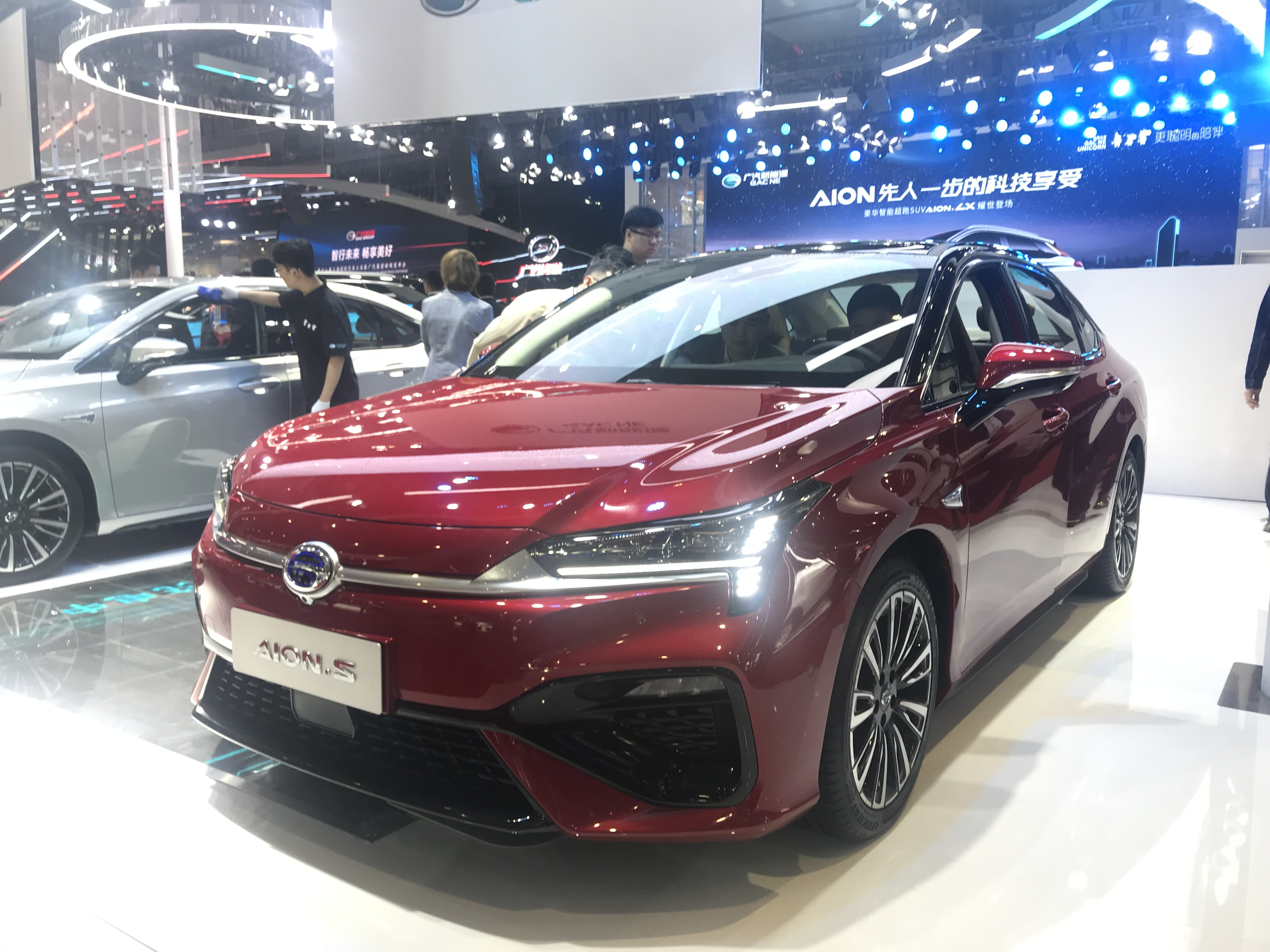
Aion S

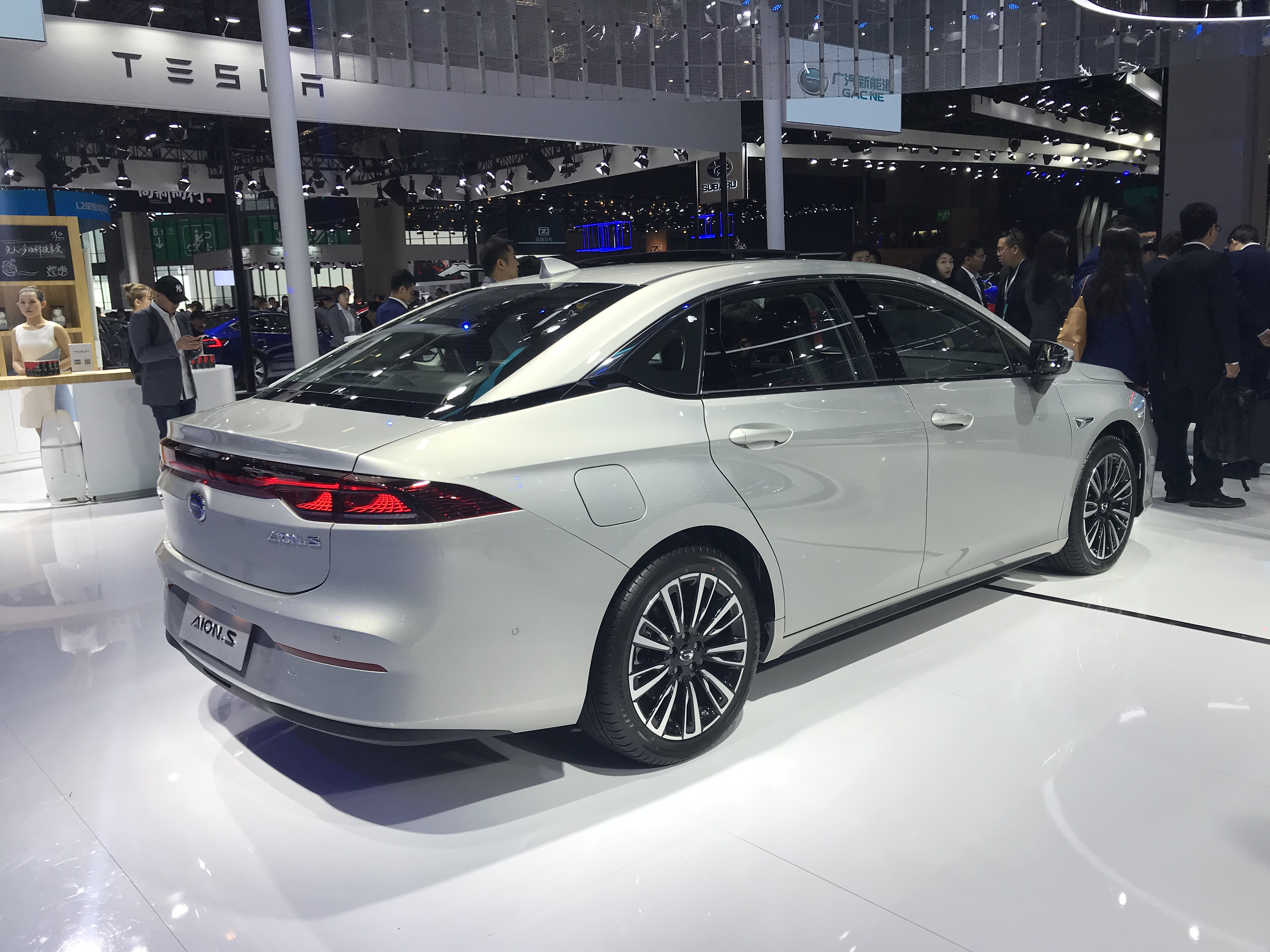
Rear view

There are 7 trim levels available as of July 2020, with the Mei 580 and Xuan 580 being the lowest trim level available and features a different and cheaper exterior design. The Mei 580 and Xuan 580 trim models were launched in July 2020 with a NEDC range of 460 kilometres (286 mi) and 136 hp (101 kW; 138 PS).

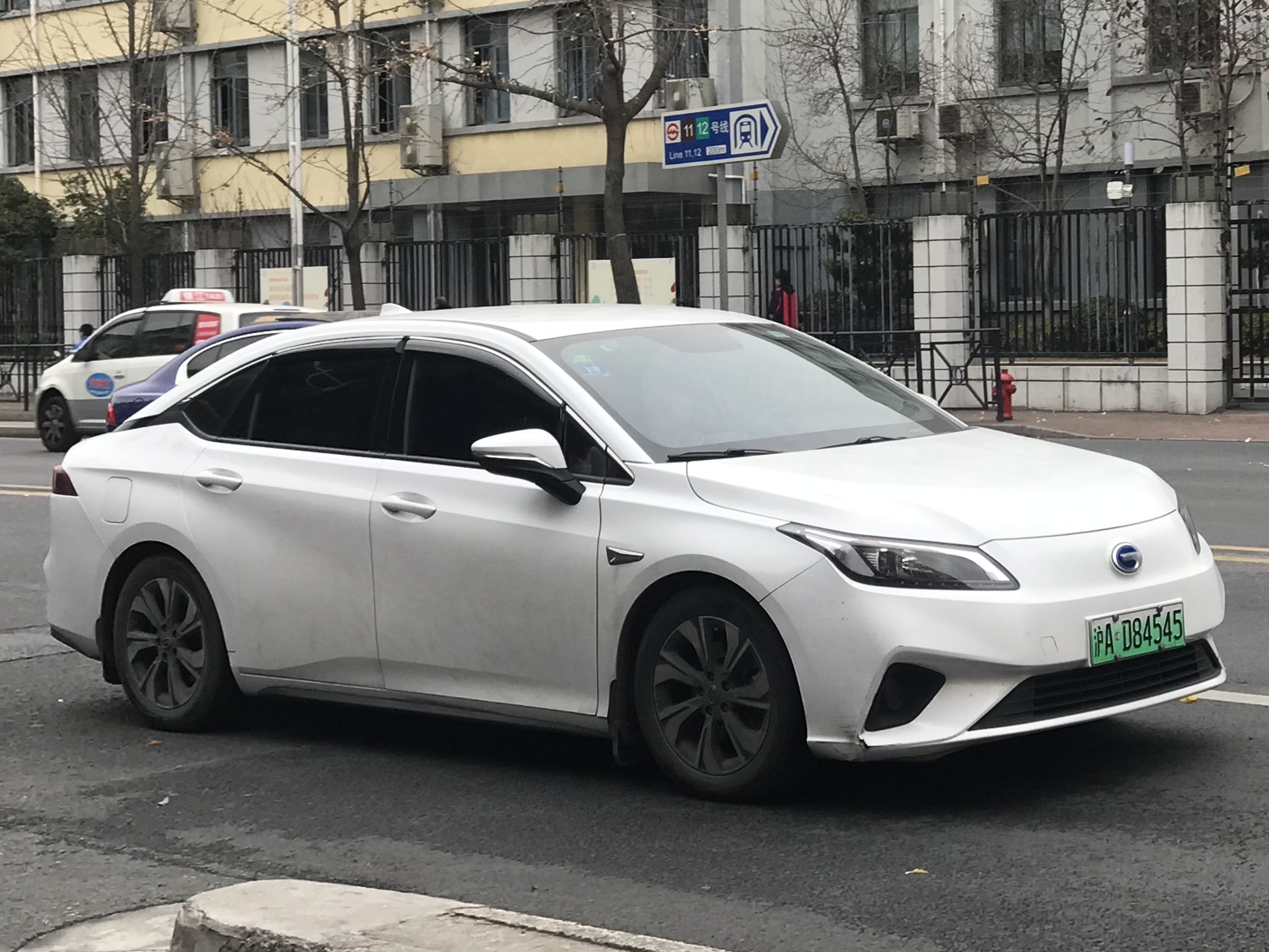
Aion S Xuan 580

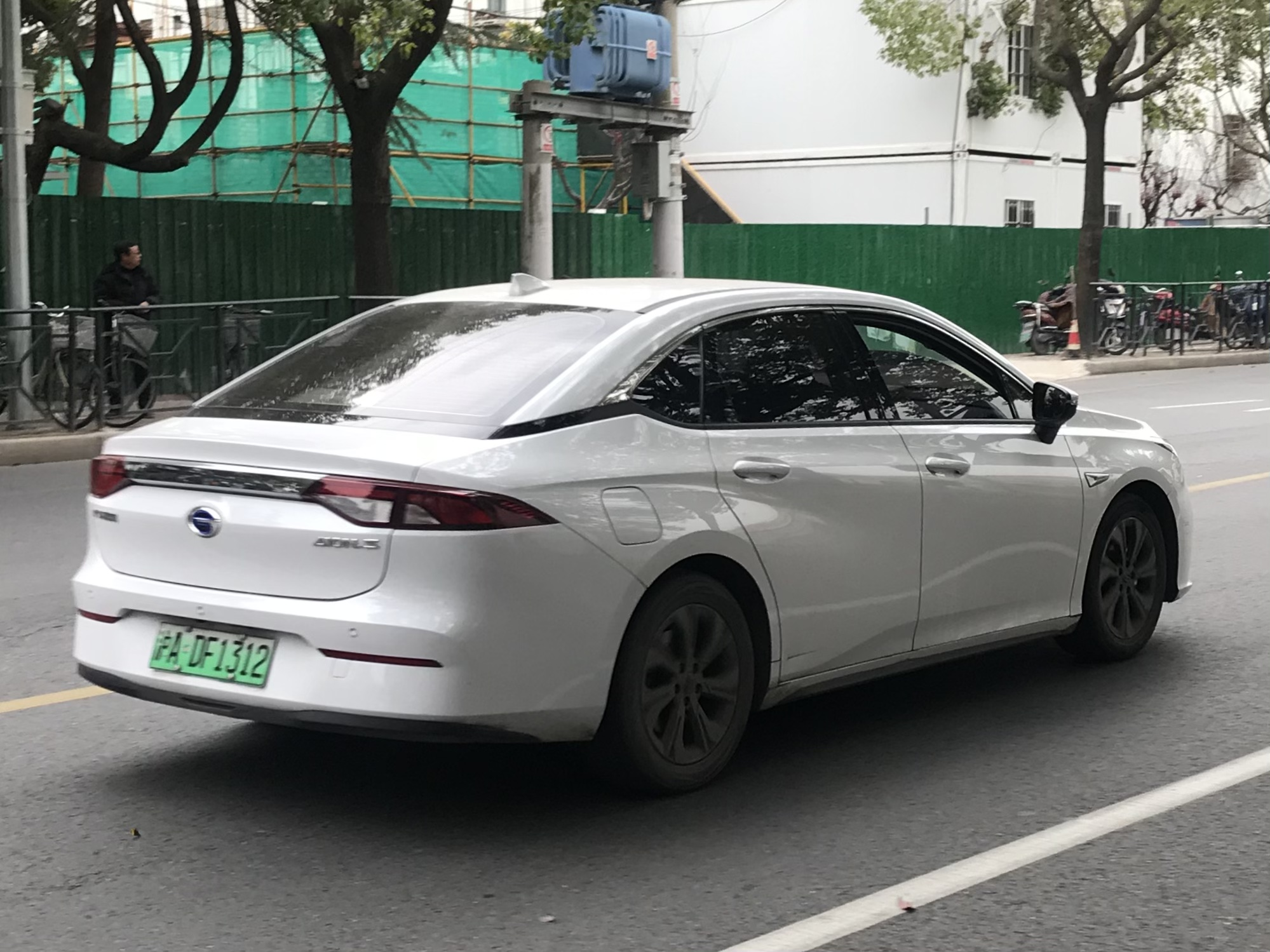
Rear view

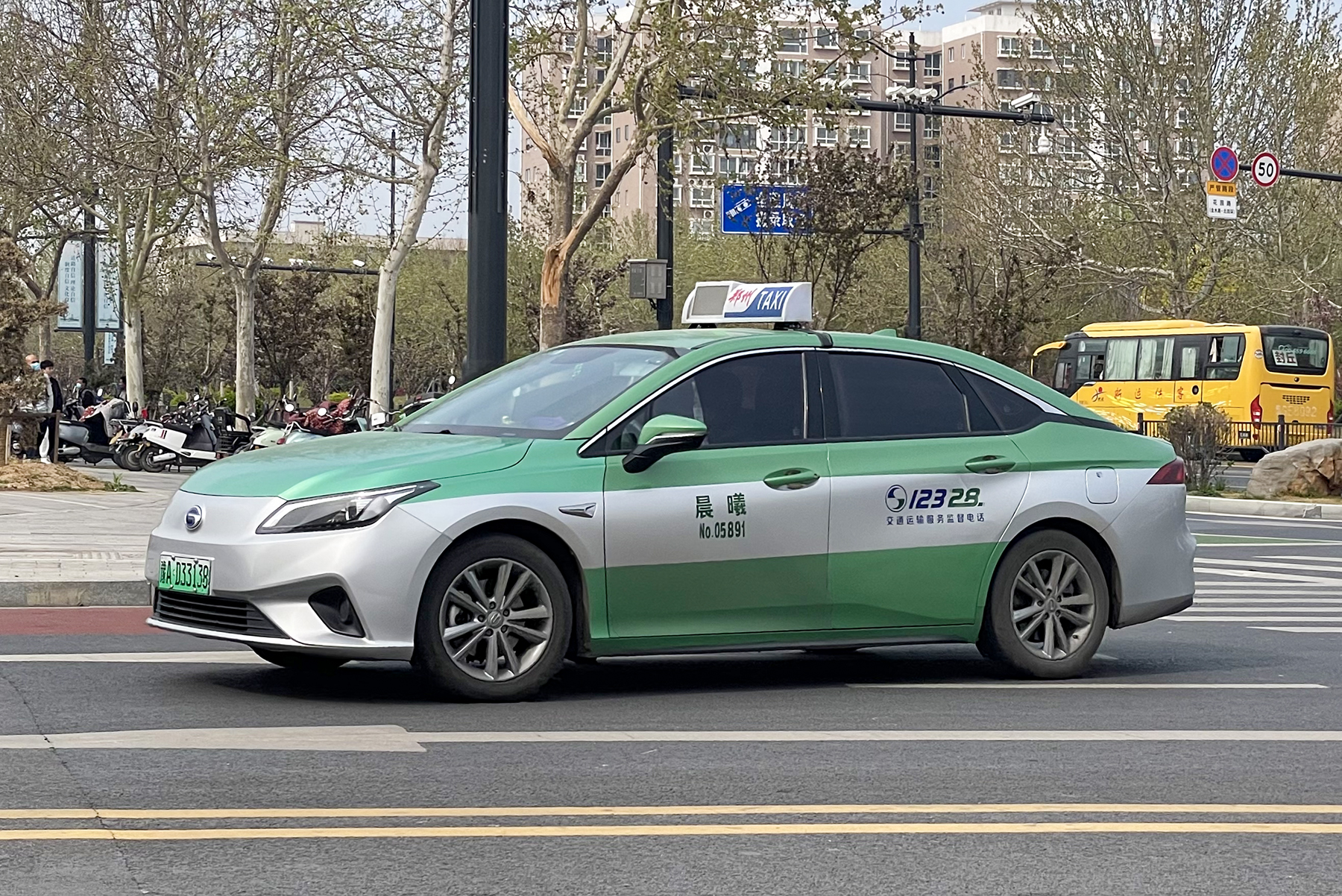
The Aion S taxi in Zhengzhou.

Being the first car by Aion, the Aion S is also the first car to adopt Aion's design language that differentiates the S, LX, and V from Trumpchi vehicles. The front-end on the exterior of the car features LED headlights, and a silver bar starting under a headlight and stretching to the other. In the middle of the bar is GAC New Energy's 'G' emblem on the blue background, similar to that of Toyota's, and their Lexus marque, logo highlighted in blue. The rear-end features a taillight bar that goes over the 'G' logo on the trunk connecting the two taillights that are not on the trunk. The rear also uses retroreflectors on the rear bumper as an alternative to a taillight.

Voice integration in the car allows for control of air conditioning, navigation system, and power windows. Alongside the other features is a 12.3-inch infotainment screen. To power the interior, the car has clear solar panels on the sunroof.

The Aion S has a 58.8 kWh (212 MJ) battery. This allows for 510 kilometres (317 mi) of range according to the NEDC methodology used in China. The car uses a 170Wh/kg CATL lithium-ion battery, and the power output is 180 hp (134 kW; 182 PS).

== Aion S Plus ==
Aion S Plus
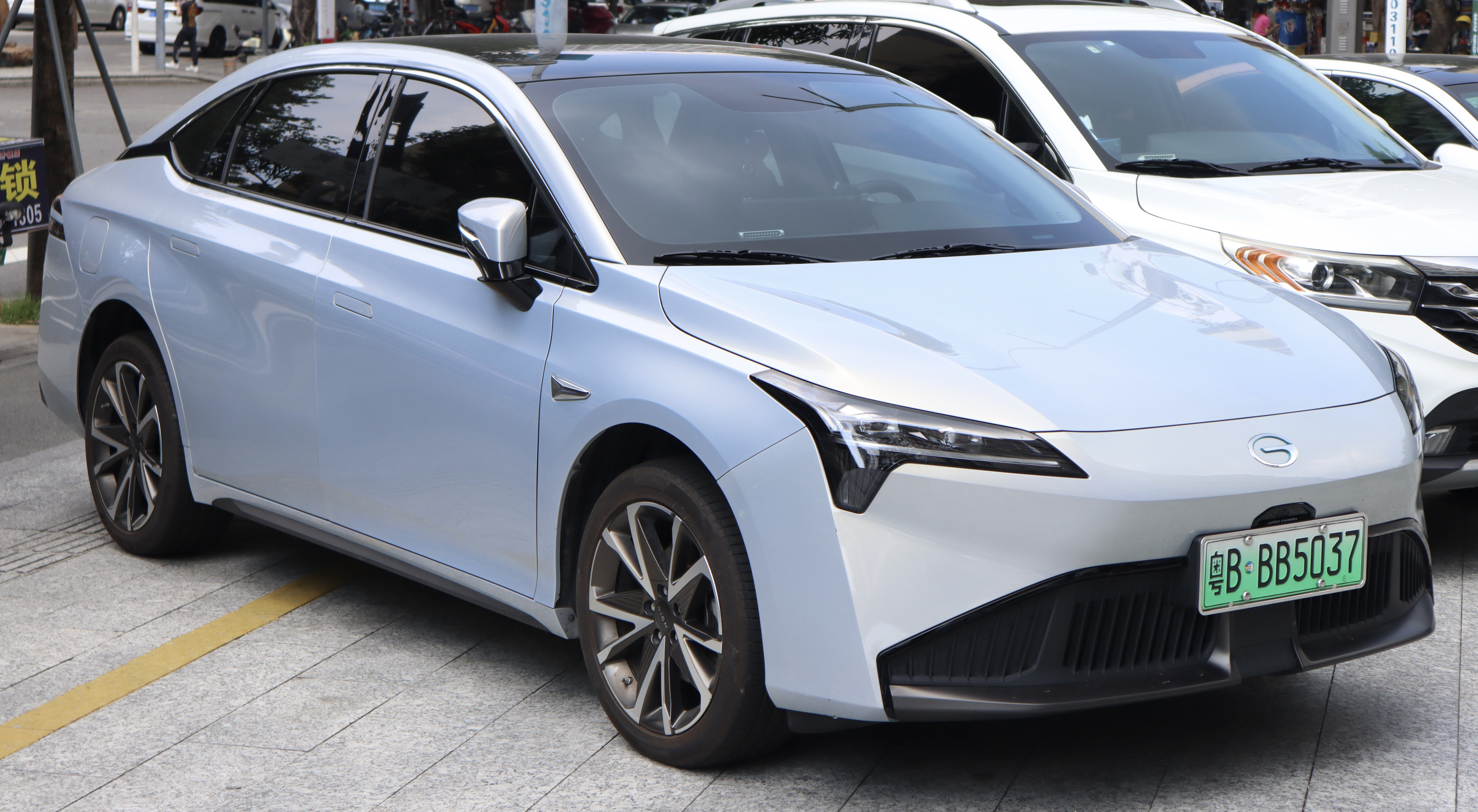

Overview
- Also called: Aion ES (export)
- Production: 2021–present
- Designer: Xiao Lin

Body and chassis
- Layout: Front-motor, front-wheel-drive

Powertrain
- Electric motor: Permanent magnet synchronous motors
- Power output: 100–165 kW (136–224 PS; 134–221 hp)
- Transmission: Single speed
- Battery: LFP Magazine battery: 50.6 kWh; 55.2 kWh (ES); 59.4 kWh; 60 kWh; NMC: 58.8 kWh; 65 kWh; 68 kWh; 69.9 kWh
- Electric range: 510–610 km (317–379 mi) (CLTC)

Dimensions
- Wheelbase: 2,750 mm (108.3 in)
- Length: 4,810 mm (189.4 in)
- Width: 1,880 mm (74.0 in)
- Height: 1,515 mm (59.6 in)

In 2021, the Aion S Plus was introduced, featuring different styling than the Aion S, slightly different exterior dimensions, and a choice of three battery sizes, the largest of which is 69.9 kWh (252 MJ). Previewed by the Aion ENO.146 concept car, the Aion S Plus has a drag coefficient of 0.211 C_{d}. As for the powertrain, the Aion S Plus is powered by a single electric motor with 204 hp (152 kW; 207 PS) and 350 N⋅m (258 lb⋅ft). The motor is powered by a 62 kWh (220 MJ) battery, good for a NEDC range of 510 kilometres (317 mi).

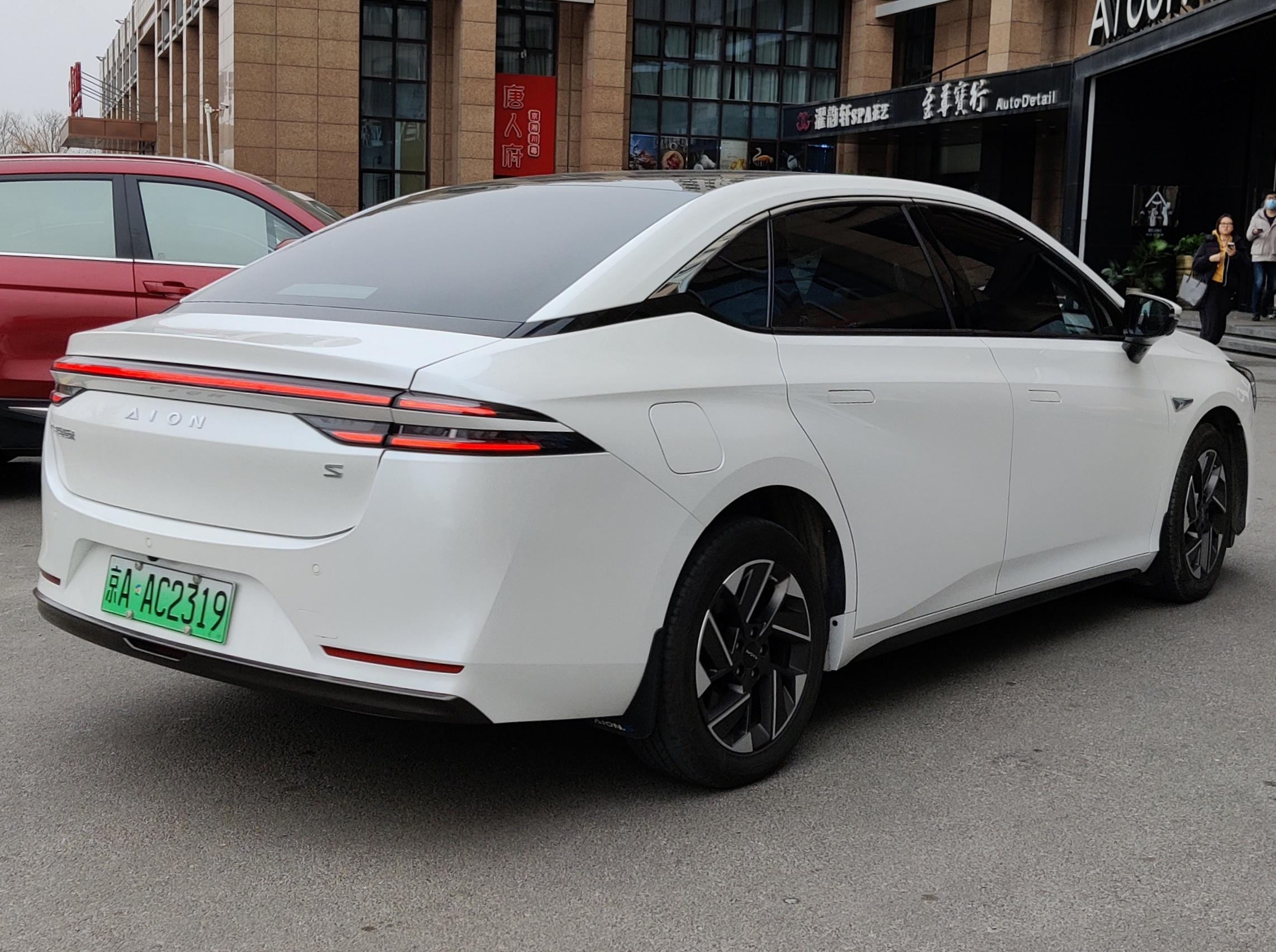
Rear view

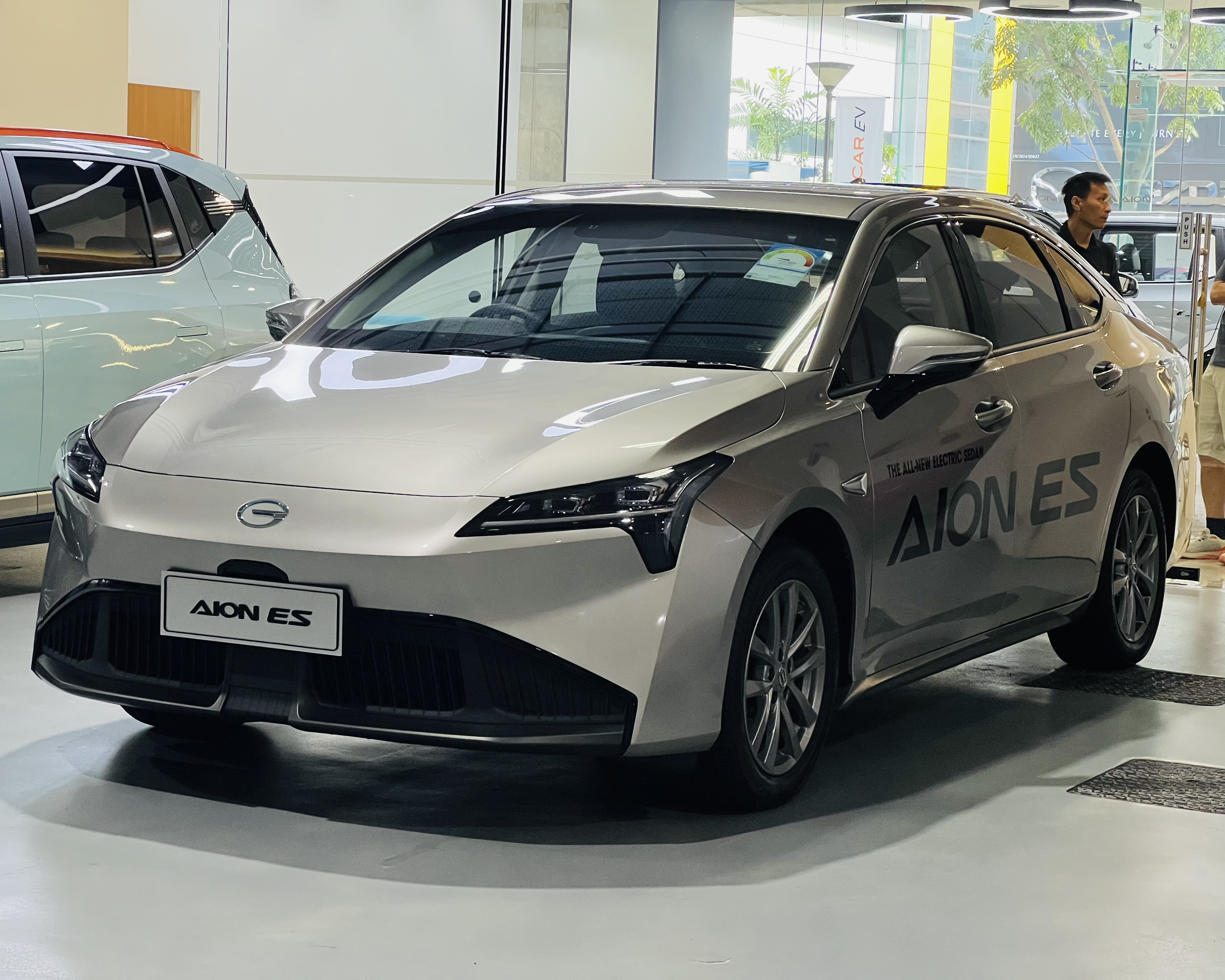
Aion ES

Rear view

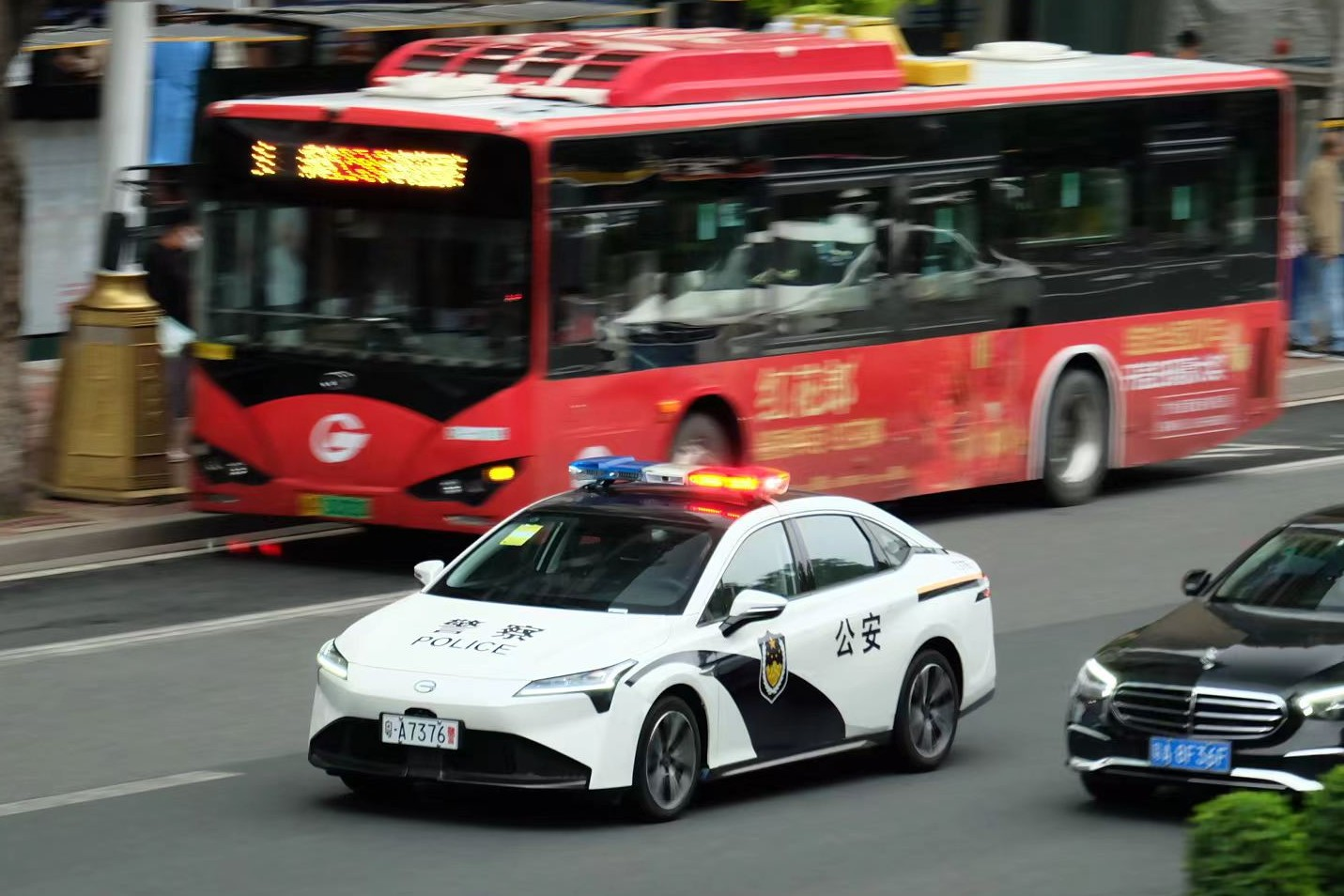
The Aion S Plus police cruiser on the street.

== Aion S Max ==
Aion S Max

Overview
- Production: 2023–2026

Body and chassis
- Layout: Front-motor, front-wheel-drive

Powertrain
- Electric motor: Permanent magnet synchronous motors
- Power output: 150 kW (204 PS; 201 hp); 180 kW (245 PS; 241 hp)
- Transmission: Single speed
- Battery: 59.5 kWh LFP lithium ion; 60 kWh LFP lithium ion; 67.1 kWh LFP lithium ion; 67.9 kWh LFP lithium ion
- Electric range: 510–610 km (317–379 mi) (CLTC)

Dimensions
- Wheelbase: 2,760 mm (108.7 in)
- Length: 4,863 mm (191.5 in)
- Width: 1,890 mm (74.4 in)
- Height: 1,515 mm (59.6 in)

The Aion S Max was launched in 2023, and is powered by a 180 kW (241 hp; 245 PS) electric motor with a top speed of 163 km/h (101 mph).

Rear view

== GAC Toyota iA5 ==
The GAC Toyota iA5 is rebadged variant of the Aion S with different front and rear ends and a slightly changed interior and will be sold exclusively at Toyota Leahead dealerships. It is the third model in the Leahead lineup after the i1, a Toyota Vitz-based subcompact hatchback, and the iX4, a Trumpchi GS4-based compact SUV.

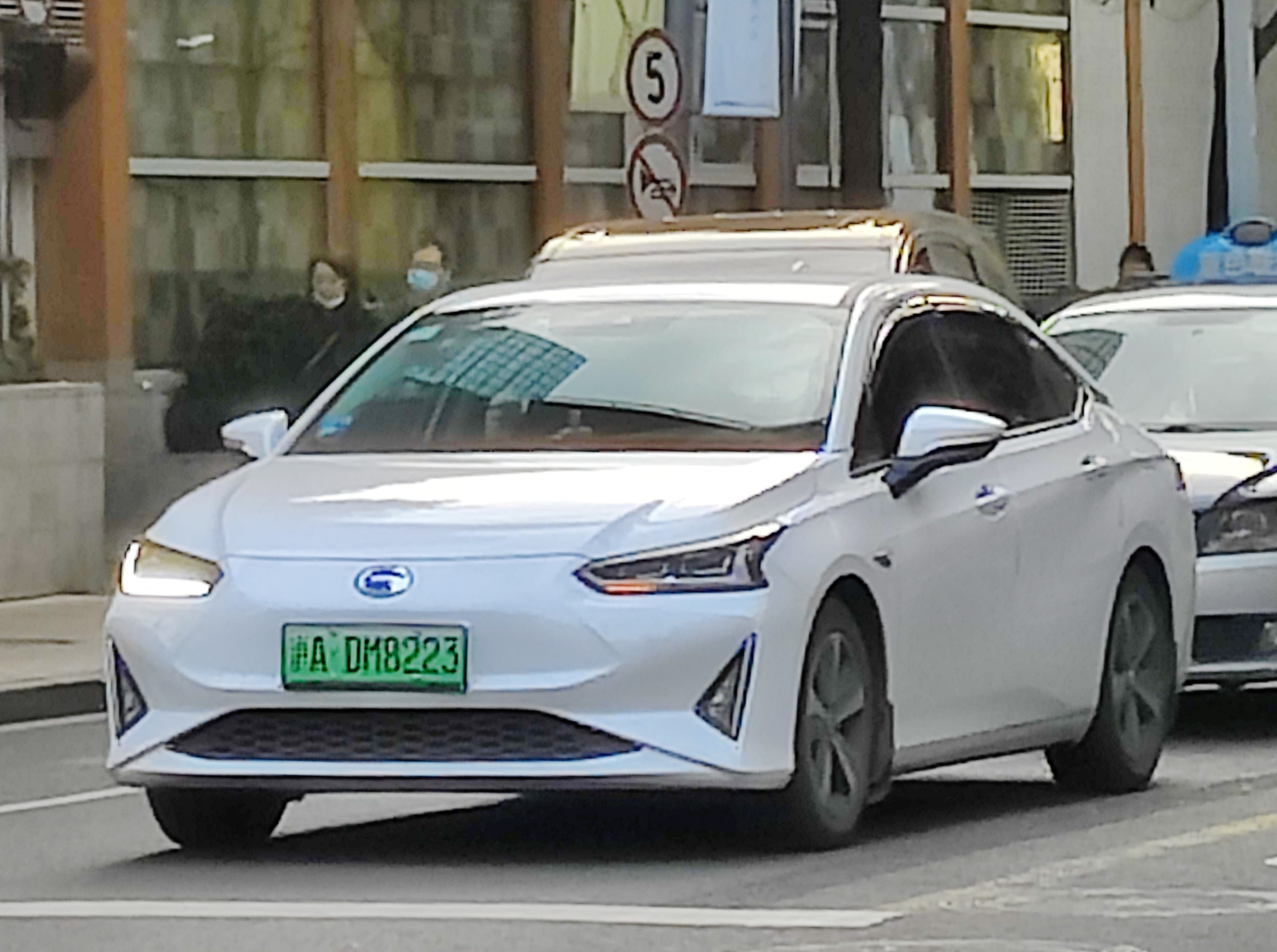
GAC Toyota iA5 (pre-facelift)

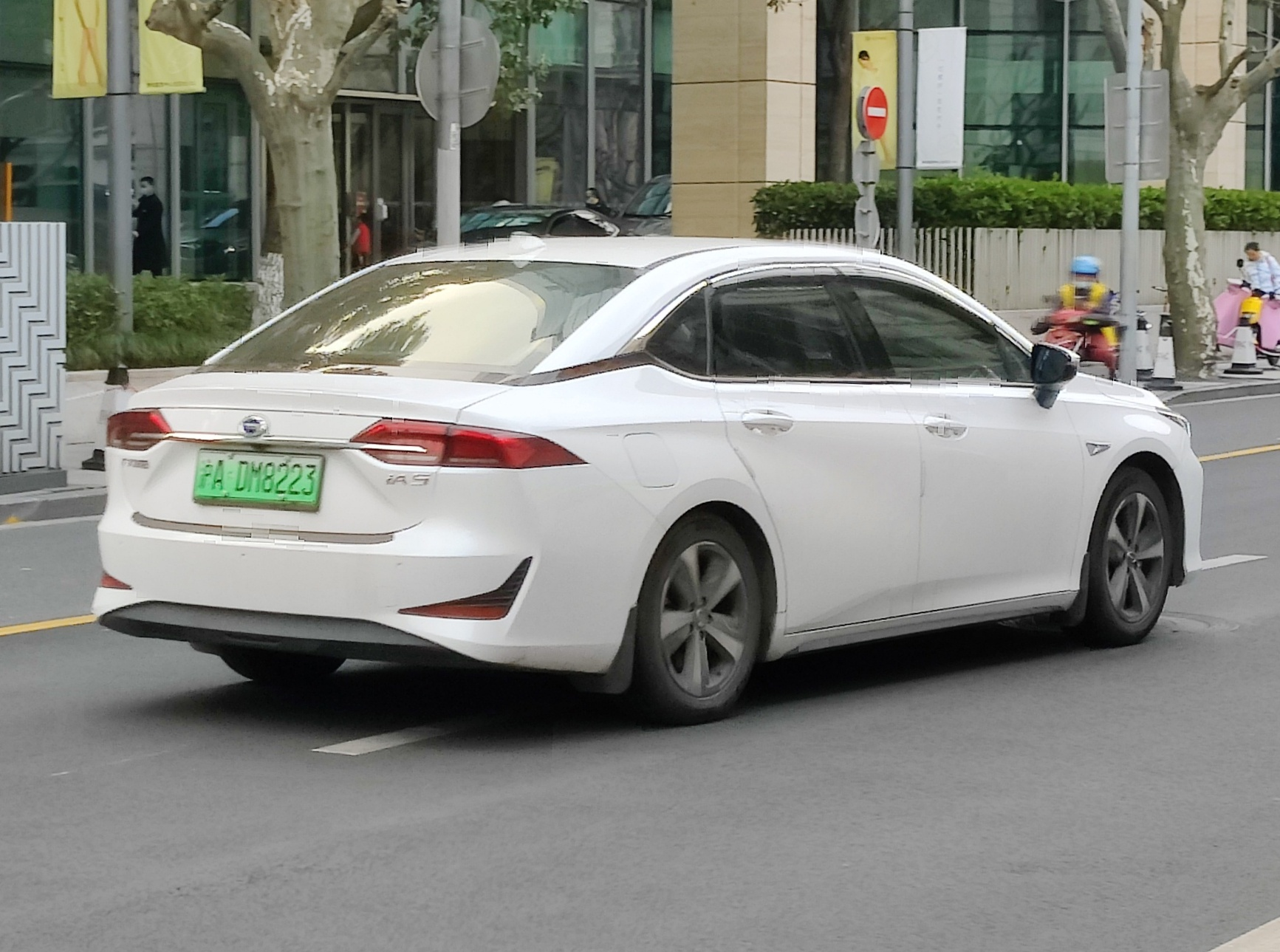
Rear view

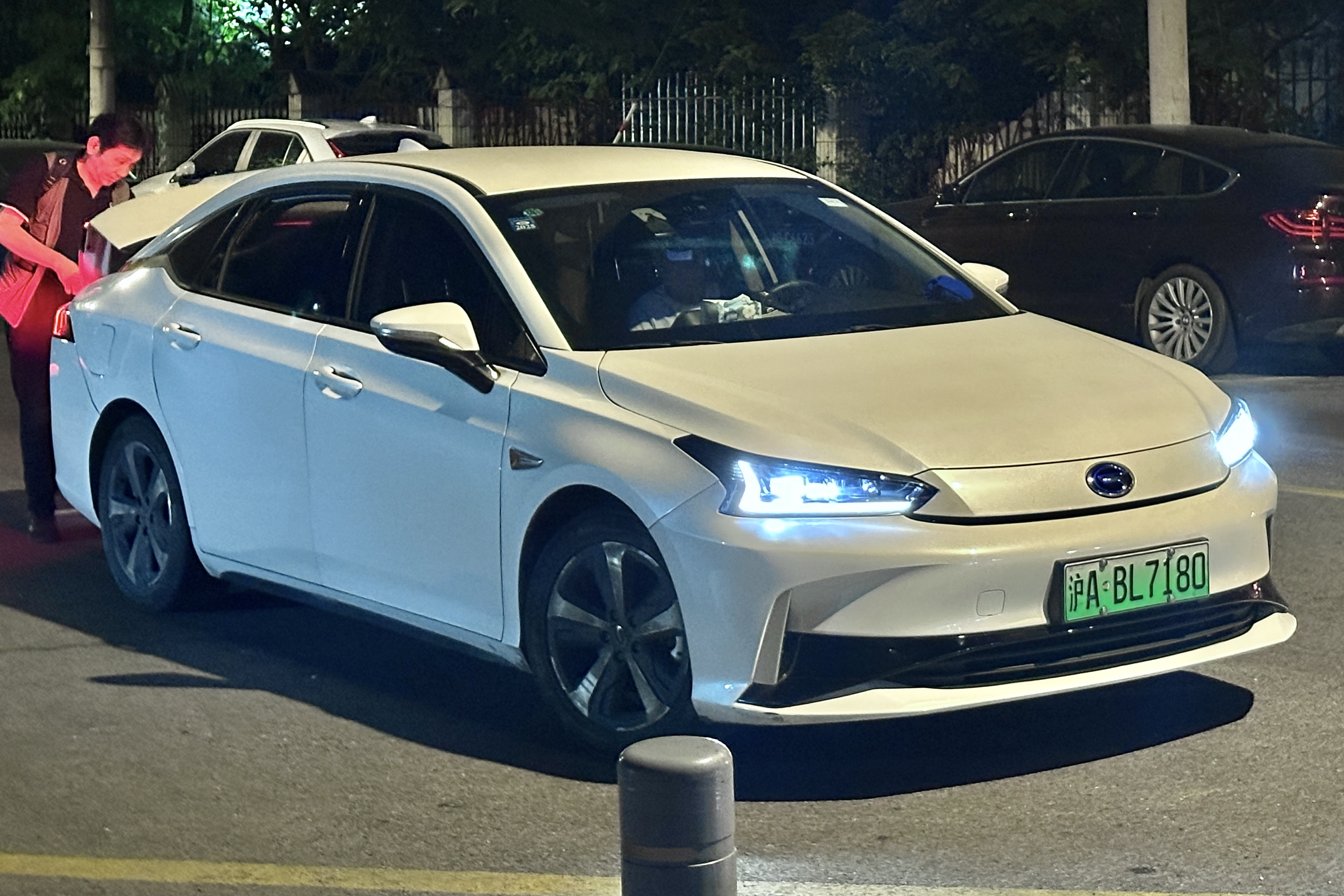
GAC Toyota iA5 (facelift)

== GAC Honda EA6 ==
The GAC Honda EA6 is rebadged variant of the Aion S. The EA6 uses the same 180 hp (134 kW; 182 PS) and 300 N⋅m (221 lb⋅ft) motor, and is equipped with the same 58.8 kWh battery, capable of a range of 460 km (286 mi) on the NEDC cycle. The EA6 is 32 mm (1.3 in) longer than the Aion S.

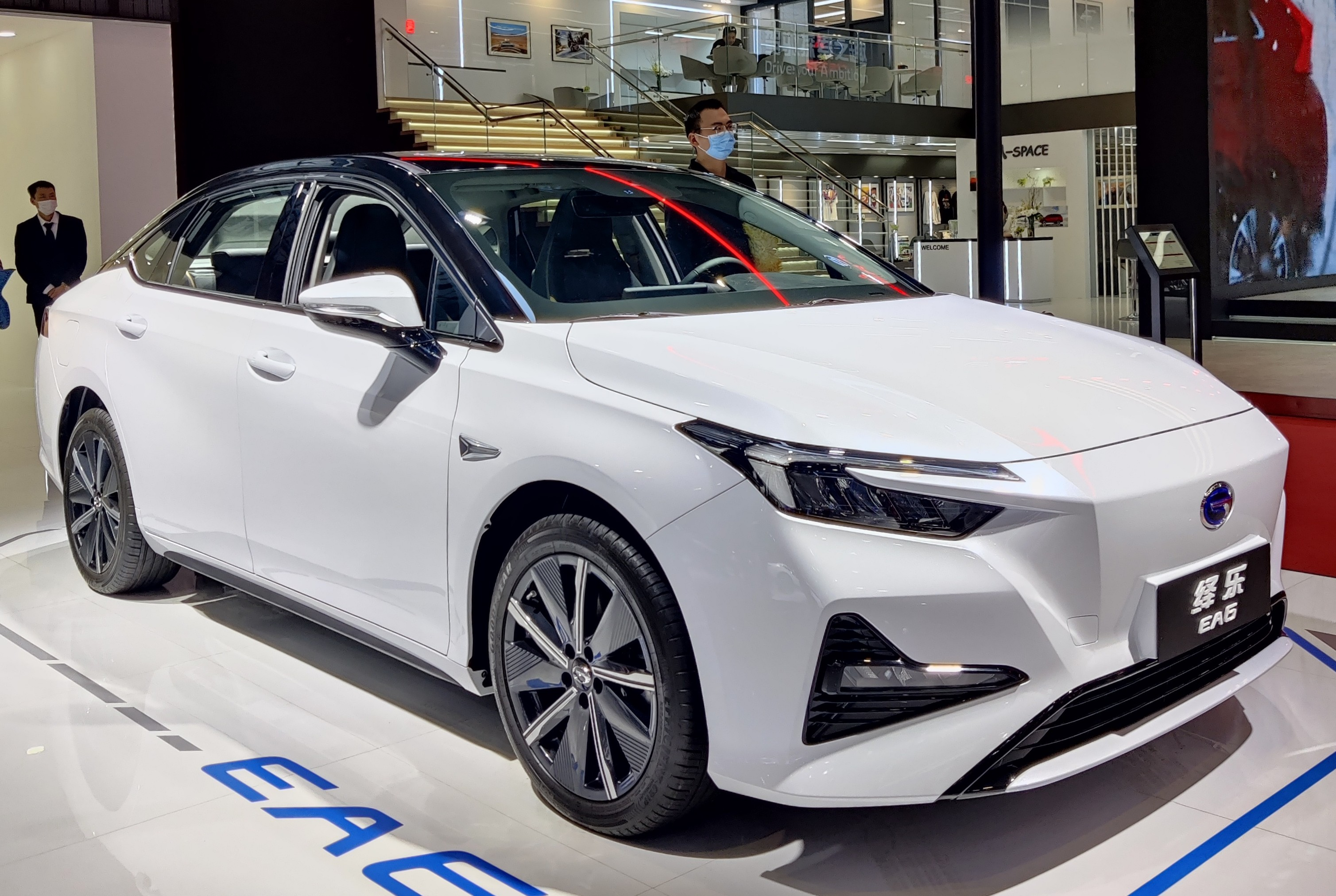
GAC Honda EA6

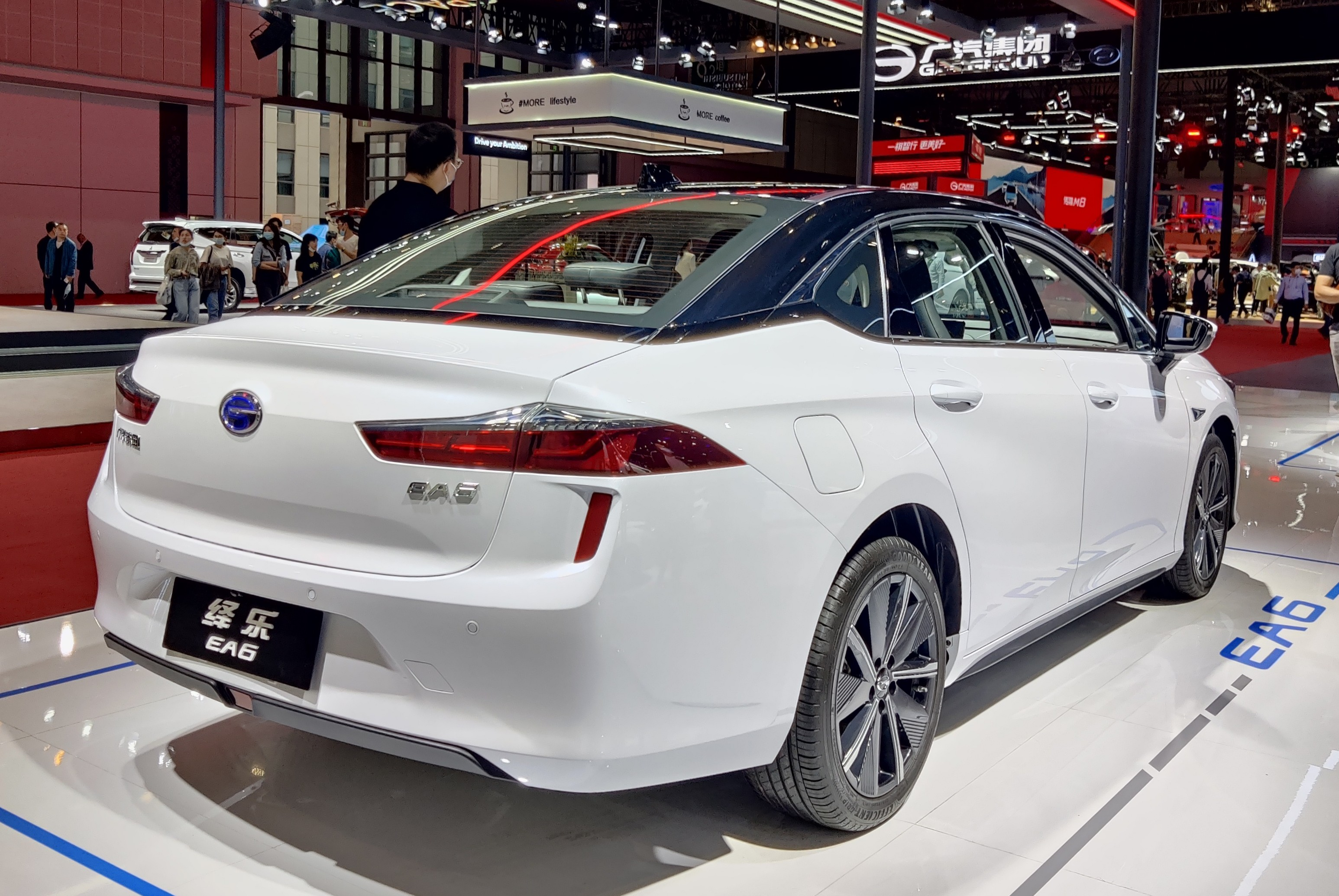
Rear view

== Sales ==
Calendar year	Aion S Sales	Leahead iA5 Sales	GAC-Honda EA6 (Yile) Sales	Total Sales	Notes
2019	32,126	2,043		34,169	Aion S sales start in May; Leahead iA5 sales start in November
2020	45,262	6,828		52,090	
2021	69,219	3,895		73,114	
2022	115,655	1,237	658	117,550	GAC-Honda EA6 (Yile) sales start in March
2023	210,844	363	45	221,296	
2024	126,846	1	2	128,849	
2025	61,097	1	2	61,100	

== See also ==
- Aion LX, a mid-size electric crossover by Aion
- List of GAC vehicles
