= Ranbu no Melody =

- Regular edition cover

Single by SID

from the album Dead Stock
- B-side: "Danro"
- Released: December 1, 2010
- Genre: Rock
- Length: 12:29
- Label: Ki/oon Records
- Songwriters: Mao, Aki, Shinji

SID singles chronology
"Cosmetic" (2010)	"Ranbu no Melody" (2010)	"Itsuka" (2011)

Music video
- "Ranbu no Melody" on YouTube

"Ranbu no Melody" (乱舞のメロディ) is a single by Japanese rock band Sid, released on December 1, 2010, by Ki/oon Records. Opening theme of Bleach anime, it also figured on the television shows a-ha-N and Be-Bop! High Heele. The song was included on the album Dead Stock and the compilation Sid Anime Best 2008-2017.

== Promotion and release ==
In May, it was announced that SID's new single "Ranbu no Melody" would be chosen as opening theme of Bleach. The song started airing in the anime episodes on October 12.

Before being officially released on CD, the song debuted on DAM karaoke with a freebie for those who downloaded it. Three editions were released on December 1, 2010: the regular edition and the limited editions A and B. The limited editions came with a CD and a DVD, this one different for each of the two, and the regular edition only contained the CD with its 3 tracks: "Ranbu no Melody", the B-side "Danro" and a live version of "Hosoi Koe".

== Musical style ==
CD Journal website described the song as rock with aggressive guitar and drums and a high beat.

== Commercial performance ==
"Ranbu no Melody" reached fifth place on weekly Oricon Albums Chart and stayed on chart for thirteen weeks. In Recochoku's daily chart, it reached first place. In June 2011, it was certified gold disc by RIAJ for selling more than 100.000 digital copies.

It is SID's fourth best-selling single, according to Oricon list.

== Tracks ==
All lyrics are written by Mao.

No.	Title	Music	Length
1.	"Ranbu no Melody" (乱舞のメロディ)	Aki	3:53
2.	"Danro" (暖炉)	Shinji	3:21
3.	"Hosoi Koe" (Live from SID Summer Festa 2010)	Shinji	5:14
Total length:			12:29

== Personnel ==
- Mao – vocals
- Shinji – guitar
- Aki – bass
- Yūya – drums
