= Dead Stock =

- Regular edition cover

Studio album by SID
- Released: February 23, 2011
- Genre: Pop rock
- Length: 43:35
- Language: Japanese
- Label: Ki/oon Music

SID chronology
Hikari (2009)	Dead Stock (2011)	M&W (2012)

Singles from Dead Stock
- 1. "One way" Released: November 11, 2009; 2. "Sleep" Released: March 3, 2010; 3. "Rain" Released: June 2, 2010; 4. "Cosmetic" Released: September 29, 2010; 5. "Ranbu no Melody" Released: December 1, 2010

Dead Stock (stylized as dead stock) is the sixth studio album by Japanese visual kei rock band SID, released on February 23, 2011, by Ki/oon Records. It was released in three editions: the regular edition and the limited editions A and B.

The album's singles are "One way", "Sleep", "Rain", theme of Fullmetal Alchemist, "Cosmetic" and "Ranbu no Melody", theme of Bleach. It was supported by Dead Stock Tour 2011, which had some performances postponed due to the 2011 Tōhoku earthquake and tsunami.

== Commercial performance ==
Dead Stock reached number four on Oricon Albums Chart and remained on chart for 13 weeks. It was certified gold by RIAJ for selling more than 100,000 copies. The limited edition A was ranked as the 80th best-selling album of 2011 in Japan by Oricon.

== Track listing ==
All lyrics are written by Mao.

No.	Title	Music	Length
1.	"No LDK"	Shinji	3:37
2.	"Shelter" (シェルター)	Shinji	3:45
3.	"Cosmetic"	Shinji	3:22
4.	"Iihito" (いいひと)	Aki	3:36
5.	"Ranbu no Melody" (乱舞のメロディ)	Aki	3:57
6.	"Rain" (レイン)	Yūya	3:59
7.	"Dog run"	Shinji	3:43
8.	"One way"	Aki	4:13
9.	"Nigatsu" (2月)	Shinji	3:43
10.	"Wife" (ワイフ)	Aki	3:49
11.	"Sleep"	Aki	5:04
12.	"Sympathy"	Aki	5:04
Total length:			43:35

== Personnel ==
- Mao − vocals
- Shinji − guitar
- Aki − bass
- Yūya − drums
