= Mucc discography =

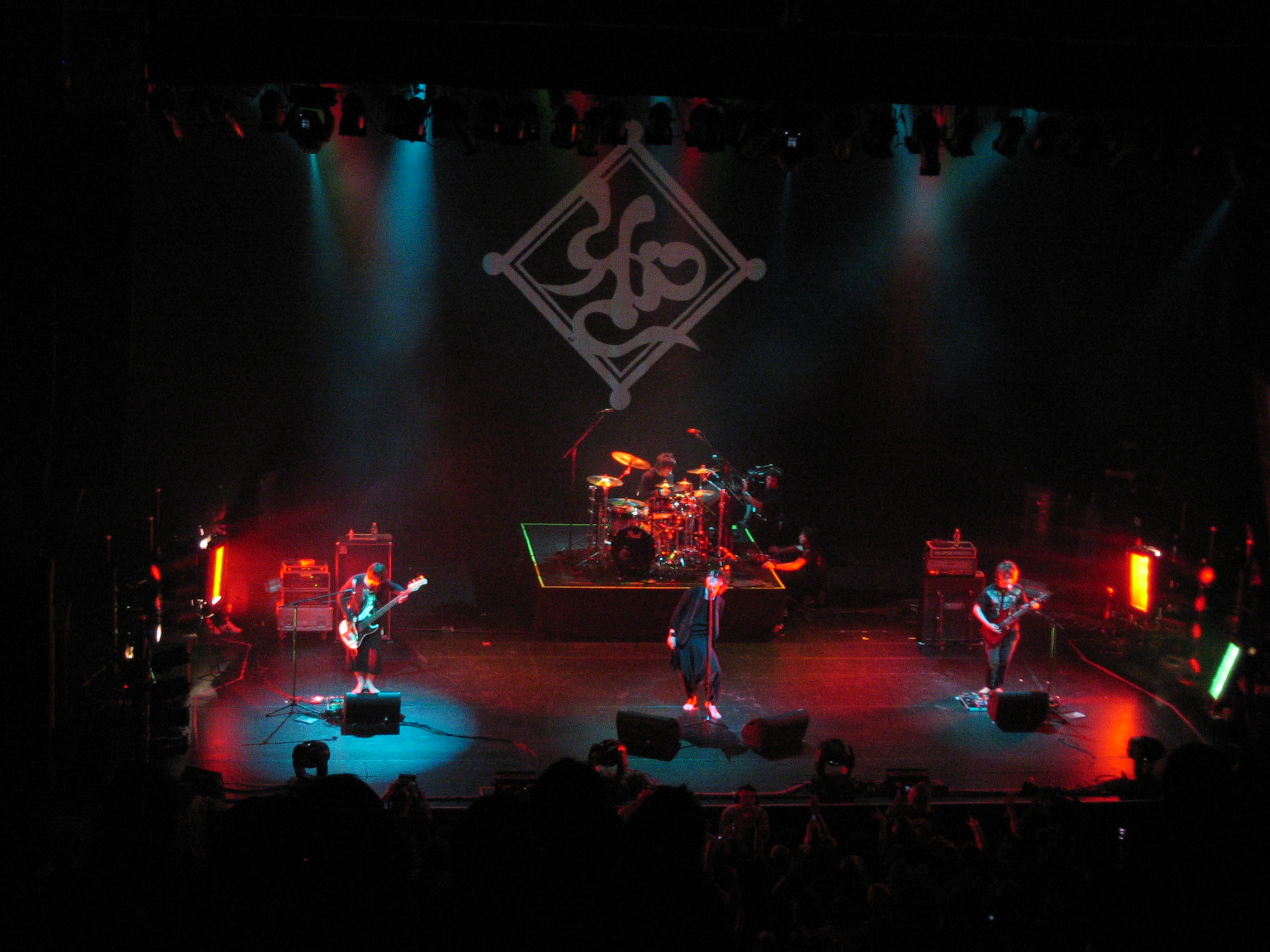
- Mucc performing in Los Angeles in 2007
- Studio albums: 18
- EPs: 5
- Live albums: 3
- Compilation albums: 9
- Singles: 51
- Video albums: 35
- Self-cover albums: 3
- Various artists compilations: 17
- Demos: 15

The discography of Mucc includes 18 studio albums, three live albums, five extended plays, 51 singles, 15 demos and 35 video albums. They are a Japanese visual kei rock band, formed in Ibaraki Prefecture in 1997. When original bassist Hiro left in 1999, the classic line up of Tatsuro on vocals, Miya on guitar, Yukke on bass, and Satochi on drums was solidified. Antique, their debut EP, was released in 1999 by Misshitsu Neurose, an independent record label formed by Cali Gari guitarist Ao Sakurai. Mucc signed to Danger Crue Records and established their own sublabel, Shu, for the 2002 release of their second album, Hōmura Uta. The band made their major label debut on Universal with Zekū the following year. In 2009, they returned to being an indie band on Danger Crue, before signing to Sony for 2012's Shangri-La. With the end of 2017, Mucc returned to being an independent band on Danger Crue yet again. After 24 years, Satochi retired from the music industry in October 2021, leaving Mucc a trio. They made their third major label debut on Tokuma Japan Communications in 2024.

== Studio albums ==
Title	Album details	JPN Oricon	JPN Billboard Top	JPN Billboard Hot
Tsūzetsu 痛絶	Released: January 7, 2001; Label: Misshitsu Neurose	–	–	–
Hōmura Uta 葬ラ謳	Released: September 6, 2002; Label: Danger Crue	48	–	–
Zekū 是空	Released: September 3, 2003; Label: Universal Gear	17	–	–
Kuchiki no Tō 朽木の灯	Released: September 1, 2004; Label: Universal Gear	19	–	–
Hōyoku 鵬翼	Released: November 23, 2005; Label: Universal Sigma	22	–	–
6	Released: April 26, 2006; Label: Universal Sigma	29	–	–
Gokusai 極彩	Released: December 6, 2006; Label: Universal Sigma	22	–	–
Shion 志恩	Released: March 26, 2008; Label: Universal Sigma	13	16	–
Kyūtai 球体	Released: March 4, 2009; Label: Universal Sigma	12	11	–
Karma カルマ	Released: October 6, 2010; Label: Danger Crue	11	9	–
Shangri-La シャングリラ	Released: November 28, 2012; Label: Sony Music Associated	18	13	–
The End of the World	Released: June 25, 2014; Label: Sony Music Associated	13	13	–
Myakuhaku 脈拍	Released: January 25, 2017; Label: Sony Music Associated	17	15	21
Kowareta Piano to Living Dead 壊れたピアノとリビングデッド	Released: February 13, 2019; Label: Maverick	16	18	22
Aku 惡	Released: June 10, 2020; Label: Maverick	6	6	9
Shin Sekai 新世界	Released: June 9, 2022; Label: Maverick	9	13	13
Timeless	Released: December 28, 2023; Label: Maverick	11	21	24
1997	Released: April 2, 2025; Label: Tokuma	24	25	–
"–" denotes a recording released before the creation of the Billboard chart, or that did not chart.

== Extended plays ==
Title	Album details	JPN Oricon	JPN Billboard Top	JPN Billboard Hot
Antique アンティーク	Released: December 25, 1999; Label: Misshitsu Neurose	–	–	–
Aishū 哀愁	Released: December 25, 2001; Label: Danger Crue	–	–	–
T.R.E.N.D.Y. -Paradise from 1997-	Released: June 24, 2015; Label: Sony Music Associated	17	15	17
Shin Sekai Bekkan 新世界 別巻	Released: December 21, 2022; Label: Maverick	37	45	48
Invader	Released: December 4, 2024; Label: Tokuma	–	–	–
"–" denotes a recording released before the creation of the Billboard chart, or that did not chart.

== Live albums ==
Title	Album details	JPN Oricon	JPN Billboard Top
Kuchiki no Tō Live at Roppongi 朽木の灯ライヴアット六本木	Released: October 31, 2004 (online order), January 26, 2005; Label: Universal Gear; Format: CD	131	–
Psychedelic Analysis サイケデリックアナライシス	Released: March 28, 2007; Label: Universal Sigma; Format: CD	71	–
Best Live CDs from Tour Aku - The Brightness World Best live CDs from TOUR 惡-The brightness world	Released: December 24, 2021; Label: Maverick; Format: CD	87	70
"–" denotes a recording released before the creation of the Billboard chart.

== Other live albums ==
Title	Release date	Notes
Live Bootleg #1	August 23, 2006	Given to those who purchased both the limited and regular editions of the "Utagoe" single.
Live Bootleg #2	November 8, 2006	Given to those who purchased both the limited and regular editions of the "Horizont" single.
Live Bootleg #3	December 6, 2006	Given to those who purchased both limited editions of the Gokusai album.

== Self-cover albums ==
Title	Album details	JPN Oricon	JPN Billboard Top	JPN Billboard Hot
Shin Tsūzetsu 新痛絶	Released: August 9, 2017; Label: Maverick; Format: CD	28	24	54
Shin Hōmura Uta 新葬ラ謳	Released: August 9, 2017; Label: Maverick; Format: CD	29	25	56
Koroshi no Shirabe II: This is Not Greatest Hits 殺シノ調べII This is NOT Greatest Hits	Released: September 13, 2017; Label: Maverick; Format: CD	14	16	27

== Compilation albums ==
Title	Album details	JPN Oricon	JPN Billboard Top	JPN Billboard Hot
Cover Parade	Released: June 6, 2006; Label: Universal Sigma; Format: CD	–	–	–
Best of Mucc	Released: June 6, 2007; Label: Universal Sigma; Format: CD	24	–	–
Worst of Mucc	Released: June 6, 2007; Label: Universal Sigma; Format: CD	25	–	–
Coupling Best カップリング・ベスト	Released: August 12, 2009; Label: Universal Sigma; Format: CD	29	34	–
Coupling Worst カップリング・ワースト	Released: August 19, 2009; Label: Universal Sigma; Format: CD	32	35	–
Aishū no Antique 哀愁のアンティーク	Released: August 22, 2012; Label: Danger Crue; Format: CD	69	56	–
Best of Mucc II & Coupling Best II	Released: March 29, 2017; Label: Sony Music Associated; Format: CD	22	25	54
Best of Mucc II	Released: March 29, 2017; Label: Sony Music Associated; Format: CD	22	94	–
Coupling Best II	Released: March 29, 2017; Label: Sony Music Associated; Format: CD	23	100	–
Myōjō 明星	Released: April 21, 2021; Label: Maverick; Format: CD	11	19	26
"–" denotes a recording released before the creation of the Billboard chart, or that did not chart.

== Singles ==
Year	Title	JPN Oricon	Album
2000	"Shōfu/Hai" (娼婦/廃)	—	Tsūzetsu
2001	"Aoban" (青盤)	—	Hōmura Uta
2001	"Akaban" (赤盤)	—	Hōmura Uta
2002	"Fu o Tataeru Uta" (負ヲ讃エル謳)	—	Hōmura Uta
2003	"Waga, Arubeki Basho" (我、在ルベキ場所)	40	Zekū
2004	"Rojiura Boku to Kimi e" (路地裏 僕と君へ)	34	Kuchiki no Tō
2004	"Monokuro no Keshiki" (モノクロの景色)	17	Kuchiki no Tō
2005	"Kokoro no Nai Machi" (ココロノナイマチ)	20	Hōyoku
2005	"Ame no Orchestra" (雨のオーケストラ)	20	Hōyoku
2005	"Saishū Ressha" (最終列車)	12	Hōyoku
2006	"Gerbera" (ガーベラ)	17	Gokusai
2006	"Ryūsei" (流星)	14	Gokusai
2006	"Utagoe" (謡声)	7	Gokusai
2006	"Horizont" (ホリゾント)	14	Gokusai
2007	"Libra" (リブラ)	22	Shion
2007	"Flight" (フライト)	14	Shion
2007	"Fuzz" (ファズ)	14	Shion
2008	"Ageha" (アゲハ)	15	Kyūtai
2009	"Sora to Ito" (空と糸)	8	Kyūtai
2009	"Freesia" (フリージア)	17	Karma
2010	"Yakusoku" (約束)	8	Karma
2010	"Falling Down" (フォーリングダウン)	12	Karma
2011	"Arcadia" (featuring Daishi Dance) (アルカディア featuring DAISHI DANCE)	28	Shangri-La
2012	"Nirvana" (ニルヴァーナ)	13	Shangri-La
2012	"Mother"	21	Shangri-La
2013	"Halo"	14	The End of the World
2013	"World's End"	15	The End of the World
2014	"Ender Ender"	16	The End of the World
2014	"Yue ni, Matenrou" (故に、摩天楼)	17	Myakuhaku
2016	"Heide" (ハイデ)	14	Myakuhaku
2016	"Classic"	15	Myakuhaku
2018	"Jigen Bakudan" (時限爆弾)	15	Aku
2021	"Goner/World"	19	Shin Sekai
2024	"Ai no Uta" (愛の唄)	14	1997
2025	"Never Evergreen"	26	TBD
2026	"Love Letter" (ラブレター)		TBD
"—" denotes a recording that did not chart.

== Other singles ==
Title	Release date	Notes
"Suisō" (水槽)	June 9, 2002	Released without notice and limited to 6,900 copies.
"Diorama" (ジオラマ)	December 25, 2009	Digital-only release
"Akatsuki" (暁)	May 21, 2011	Sold at Nippon Budokan concerts on May 21–22, 2011, before receiving a digital release with all proceeds donated to aid victims of the 2011 Tōhoku earthquake and tsunami.
"Brilliant World" (ブリリアント ワールド)	December 24, 2015	Available digitally-only between December 24, 2015, and January 5, 2016.
"Marble"	January 31, 2016	Collaborative song with Aki (Sid). Sold on their M.A.D joint tour between January 31 and April 4, 2016.
"Ieji" (家路)	May 4, 2017	Sold only at an Ibarakiken Bunkacenter Large Hall concert on May 4, 2017, and two Nippon Budokan concerts on June 20–21, 2017.
"Mushi"/"Gachagachamukumuku" (蟲/ガチャガチャムクムク)	January 7, 2019	Collaborative CD with Dezert, credited to "DEZERMUCC". Sold only on their Is This The "Fact"? joint tour between January 7 and 30, 2019.
"Ameria" (アメリア)	July 26, 2019	Sold only at a Shinkiba Studio Coast concert on July 26, 2019, Miya's 40th birthday.
"My World"	August 12, 2019	Sold only at a Toyosu Pit concert on August 12, 2019, Satochi's 40th birthday.
"Taboo"	August 21, 2019	Sold only at a Nanba Hatch concert on August 21, 2019, Tatsuro's 40th birthday.
"Tatoeba Boku ga Inakattara" (例えば僕が居なかったら)	November 5, 2019	Sold only at a Tsutaya O-East concert on November 5, 2019, Yukke's 40th birthday.
"Shōfu 2020" (娼婦 2020)	June 9, 2020	Made-to-order between June 9–23, 2020, and shipped in mid-July.
"Ku" (空 -ku-)	October 9, 2022	Sold only on their Timeless ~Zekū・Kuchiki no Tō~ 25th anniversary tour between October 9 and December 14, 2022.
"So / Yo" (想 -so- / 耀 -yo-)	March 4, 2023	Sold only on their Timeless ~Hōyoku・Gokusai~ 25th anniversary tour between March 4 and May 6, 2023.
"99"	June 9, 2023	Sold only on their Timeless ~Shion・Kyūtai~ 25th anniversary tour between June 9 and August 21, 2023.
"Ubugoe" (産声)	July 28, 2023	Collaborative split single with Deadman. Sold only at a two-man concert at Spotify O-East on July 28, 2023. Mucc contributed "Shi no Ubugoe" (死の産声).
"Siren" (サイレン)	October 1, 2023	Sold only on their Timeless ~Karma・Shangri-La~ 25th anniversary tour between October 1 and November 11, 2023.
"Eyes"	November 5, 2025	Single credited to Mucc's 1990s visual kei alter ego band, "La'Mucc". Sold only at Yukke's birthday concert at Club Citta on November 5, 2025.

== V/A Compilations ==
Album	Release date	Song(s)
Hot Indies Best Selection Vol. 1	August 25, 1998	"Kranke" (クランケ)
Non Standard File: @6Sight	July 16, 2000	"Kokonoka ~Yojōhan Ver.~" (九日 〜四畳半Ver.〜), "Kokuen" (黒煙)
Shock Edge 2001	September 1, 2001	"Suimin" (スイミン)
Boøwy Respect	December 24, 2003	"Kisetsu ga Kimi Dake wo Kaeru" (季節が君だけを変える)
Rock Nippon Noriko Shoji Selection	January 24, 2007	"Rojiura Boku to Kimi e" (路地裏 僕と君へ)
Luna Sea Memorial Cover Album -Re:birth-	December 19, 2007	"Déjàvu"
Cloverfield: Rob's Party Mix	January 17, 2008	"Fuzz" (ファズ)
Detroit Metal City Tribute Album: Ikenie Metal Mix	March 28, 2008	"Flight Best Hold It Ver." (フライト Best Hold It Ver.)
This is for You: The Yellow Monkey Tribute Album	December 9, 2009	"Tsuioku no Mermaid" (追憶のマーメイド)
Parade II -Respective Tracks of Buck-Tick-	July 4, 2012	"Jupiter"
Naruto Super Sounds	November 26, 2014	"Mother"
Plastic Tree Tribute ~Transparent Branches~	September 6, 2017	"March 5" (3月5日。)
D'erlanger Tribute Album ~Stairway to Heaven~	September 13, 2017	"Crazy4You"
Kishidan Banpaku 2017	September 16, 2017	"Nirvana" (ニルヴァーナ)
Rottengraffty Tribute Album ~Mouse Trap~	December 18, 2019	"Kakurenbo feat. DJ Santa Monica" (かくれんぼ)
Granrodeo Tribute Album "Rodeo Freak"	May 13, 2020	"Mezmerize" (メズマライズ)
Ibarakidai Bakuhatsu	April 16, 2021	"Rakuyō" (落陽)

== Videos ==
- Nihon Rettō Konton Heisei Kokoro no Naka (日本列島混沌平成心ノ中; December 10, 2003)
- Mucc History DVD The Worst (ムックヒストリーDVD ザ・ワース; December 22, 2004)
- Tonan no Hōyoku (図南の鵬翼; March 29, 2006)
- World Tour Final Nippon Budokan 666 (ワールドツアーファイナル日本武道館「666」; December 10, 2006)
- Mucc -Live Chronicle- (MUCC 〜ライヴ クロニクル〜; November 28, 2007)
- Mucc -Live Chronicle 2- (MUCC 〜ライヴ クロニクル2〜; December 24, 2008)
- The Clips -Track of Six Nine- (August 5, 2009)
- Mucc Live Chronicle 3 - "Kyūtai" in Nippon Budokan- (MUCC ライヴ クロニクル3〜 「球体」 ｉｎ日本武道館〜; December 23, 2009)
- Mucc Live Chronicle 3 - "Kyūtai" in Nippon Budokan- Tsūjōban (MUCC ライヴ クロニクル3〜 「球体」 ｉｎ日本武道館〜通常版; March 10, 2010)
- Winter Circuit 2010 @ NHK Hall (WINTER CIRCUIT 2010 @NHKホール; February 14, 2011)
- Mucc Chemical Parade (November 23, 2011)
- -Mucc 15th Anniversary Year Live- Mucc vs Mucc vs Mucc Fukanzenban: Shisei (-MUCC 15th Anniversary Year Live-「MUCC vs ムック vs MUCC」不完全盤「死生」; August 22, 2012)
- -Mucc 15th Anniversary Year Live- Mucc vs Mucc vs Mucc Fukanzenban: Misshitsu (-MUCC 15th Anniversary Year Live-「MUCC vs ムック vs MUCC」不完全盤「密室」; September 13, 2012)
- -Mucc 15th Anniversary Year Live- Mucc vs Mucc vs Mucc Fukanzenban: Kodō (-MUCC 15th Anniversary Year Live-「MUCC vs ムック vs MUCC」不完全盤「鼓動」; October 3, 2012)
- -Mucc 15th Anniversary Year Live- Mucc vs Mucc vs Mucc Kanzenban (-MUCC 15th Anniversary year Live-「MUCC vs ムック vs MUCC」完全盤; February 14, 2013)
- Mucc Tour 2012-2013 "Shangri-La" (October 2, 2013)
- Six Nine Wars -Bokura no Nana-kagetsu Kan Senso- The End @ Yoyogi National Gymnasium's First Gymnasium (『SIX NINE WARS -ぼくらの七ヶ月間戦争-「THE END」@国立代々木競技場第一体育館』; February 25, 2015)
- F#ck the Past F#ck the Future on World -Paradise from T.R.E.N.D.Y.- (November 25, 2015)
- Maverick DC Presents Double Headline Tour 2016「M.A.D」 (November 23, 2016)
- The Clips II ~Track of Six Nine~ (October 4, 2017)
- Kowareta Piano to Living Dead feat. Koroshi no Shirabe (壊れたピアノとリビングデッド feat.殺シノ調ベ; December 25, 2019)
- ~Fight Against COVID-19 #2~ "Aku - The Broken Resuscitation" (～Fight against COVID-19 #2～『惡-THE BROKEN RESUSCITATION』; October 7, 2020)
- ~Fight Against COVID-19 #3~ "Aku - The Broken Resuscitation" (～Fight against COVID-19 #3～『惡-THE BROKEN RESUSCITATION』; November 25, 2020)
- From the Mothership/From the Underground (May 4, 2021)
- Aku - The Brightness World (惡-The brightness world; June 9, 2021)
- ~Fight Against COVID-19 #4~ "Myōjō Kanzen Saigen + 4" (～Fight against COVID-19 #4～『明星完全再現+4』; September 6, 2021)
- Mucc Live Chronicle 4 ~20th Anniversary~ (MUCC ライヴ クロニクル4 〜20TH ANNIVERSARY～; December 24, 2021)
- Crossroad of the Brightness World (February 2, 2022)
- Tour 202X Aku - The Brightness World is Goner (TOUR 202X 惡-The brightness WORLD is GONER; May 4, 2022)
- Shin Sekai: Eizō Zenshū Kōgashitsu-ban (「新世界」映像全集 高画質盤; February 22, 2023)
- Mucc Live Chronicle 5 25th Anniversary Jōkan (MUCC ライヴクロニクル5 25TH ANNIVERSARY 上巻; February 14, 2024)
- Mucc Live Chronicle 5 25th Anniversary Gekan (MUCC ライヴクロニクル5 25TH ANNIVERSARY 下巻; April 24, 2024)
- Mucc Live Chronicle 5 25th Anniversary (MUCCライヴクロニクル5 25TH ANNIVERSARY; April 24, 2024)
- Mucc 25th Anniversary Tour Grand Final Bring the End to "Timeless" & "World" (August 21, 2024)
- Birthday Chronicle 45 (バースデークロニクル45; February 14, 2025)

== Demos ==
- "No!?" (October 1997)
- "Aika" (哀歌; March 20, 1998)
- "Tsubasa wo Kudasai" (翼を下さい; December 1, 1998)
- "Shūka" (愁歌; February 14, 1999)
- "Aka" (アカ; July 24, 1999)
- "Jiko Keno Demo ~Dirty Ver.~" (自己嫌悪 DEMO 〜Dirty Ver.〜; June 1, 2018)
- "Jiko Keno Demo ~Clean Ver.~" (自己嫌悪 DEMO 〜Clean Ver.〜; June 11, 2018)
- "Jigen Bakudan Demo & Remix" (時限爆弾 DEMO & REMIX; September 5, 2018)
- "Zetsubō Rakuen Demo" (絶望楽園 DEMO; October 3, 2018)
- "Zetsubō Rakuen Demo -Digital Mix-" (絶望楽園 DEMO -Digital Mix-; October 9, 2018)
- "Melt Demo" (メルト DEMO; December 15, 2018)
- "Kowareta Piano to Living Dead Demo & Live" (壊れたピアノとリビングデッド DEMO＆LIVE; May 29, 2019)
- "Hotel Lemmon Tree Demo" (July 1, 2019)
- "Room Demo" (August 27, 2019)
- "Cobalt Demo" (November 10, 2019)

== Other Releases ==
=== Tribute albums ===
Album	Release date	Track Listing
Tribute of Mucc -En-	November 22, 2017	24 Songs Disc 1: 1. Ranchuu - Rottengraffty; 2. Honey - Band-Maid; 3. Saishuu Ressha - The Back Horn; 4. EMP - Ken; 5. Gerbera - Sukekiyo; 6. Oboreru Sakana - Gibkiy Gibkiy Gibkiy; 7. Utagoe - Kishidan; 8. I am Computer - Polysics; 9. Kaze to Taiyo - Cali≠Gari; 10. Ryūsei - Plastic Tree; 11. Akatsuki Yami - Sid; 12. Samidare - Girugamesh (hidden track / credited as Satoshi x Nii x Shu x Ryo); Disc 2: 1. Classic - Flow; 2. Daikirai - The Oral Cigarettes; 3. Bouzen Jishitsu - Lynch.; 4. Mr.Liar - Hysteric Panic; 5. Libra - Junko Yano; 6. Ieji - Merry; 7. Aka - Dezert; 8. Heide - Roach; 9. Flight - Breakerz; 10. Nirvana - Granrodeo; 11. Brilliant World - Sho Kiryuin; 12. Koi wa Mizuiro - Mucc (hidden track)
