= Shin Sekai (album) =

Studio album by Mucc

Studio album by Mucc
- Released: June 9, 2022
- Genre: Alternative metal
- Length: 55:00
- Label: Maverick DC Group

Mucc chronology
Aku (2020)	Shin Sekai (2022)	Timeless (2023)

Shin Sekai (新世界, lit. New World) is the sixteenth studio album by Japanese visual kei rock band Mucc. It was released on June 9, 2022, for Mucc's 25th anniversary.

Shin Sekai peaked at the ninth position on the Oricon Albums Chart.

== Track listing ==
No.	Title	Lyrics	Music	Length
1.	"星に願いを / Hoshi ni negai wo"	Tatsuro	Miya	4:54
2.	"懺把乱 / Zanbaran"	Miya	Miya	3:05
3.	"GONER"	Miya	Miya	3:55
4.	"パーフェクトサークル / Perfect Circle"	Miya	Miya	4:34
5.	"HACK"	Tatsuro	Miya	3:49
6.	"NEED"	Tatsuro	Tatsuro, Yukke	4:36
7.	"未来 / Mirai"	Miya	Miya	3:31
8.	"R&R darling"	Tatsuro	Tatsuro	4:43
9.	"COLOR"	Yukke	Yukke	3:59
10.	"Paralysis"	Miya	Miya	4:16
11.	"零 / Zero"	Miya	Miya	4:48
12.	"いきとし / Ikitoshi"	Miya	Miya	3:32
13.	"WORLD"	Tatsuro	Miya, Tatsuro	5:43
Total length:				55:00

== Personnel ==
- Tatsuro – vocals
- Miya – guitar
- Yukke – bass guitar
- Allen – drums (support)

=== Additional musicians ===
- Tooru Yoshida – keyboards
