= Hanabi =

Hanabi may refer to:

- Hanabi (花火), the Japanese word for fireworks
- Hanabi (card game), a French fireworks-themed cooperative card game

== Film ==
- Hana-bi, a Japanese crime drama film by Takeshi Kitano

== Music ==
- "Hanabi", a song by Mucc from their 2009 album Kyūtai
- "Hanabi", a song by Ayumi Hamasaki from her 2002 EP H
- "Hanabi: Episode II", a song by Ayumi Hamasaki from her 2003 EP &
- "Hanabi", a song by Mr. Children from their 2008 album Supermarket Fantasy
- "Kingyo Hanabi", a 2004 single by Ai Otsuka
- "Yoru Hanabi", a 2007 song by BeForU
- "After Hanabi-Listen to my beats", a 2003 song by Nujabes
- Hanabie., a Japanese metal band

== Other ==
- Hanabiko, the full name of Koko, a gorilla born in the San Francisco Zoo
- Hanabi, a playable character in the video game Mobile Legends: Bang Bang
