= Hōyoku =

Studio album by Mucc
- Released: November 23, 2005
- Genre: Alternative metal; post-grunge
- Length: 63:51
- Label: Danger Crue

Mucc chronology
| Kuchiki no Tō (2004) | Hōyoku (2005) | 6 (2006) |

Singles from Hōyoku
- 1. "Kokoro no Nai Machi" Released: March 30, 2005; 2. "Ame no Orchestra" Released: June 8, 2005; 3. "Saishū Ressha" Released: October 19, 2005

Hōyoku (鵬翼, lit. "Phoenix Wings") is the fifth studio album by Japanese band Mucc, released on November 23, 2005. It shows the band exploring new territory with less heavy material, drawing from folk influences. The album reached number 22 on the Oricon Albums Chart.

== Overview ==
The lyrical themes of the album are also a sharp turn away from the darkness of their previous albums. The limited edition of the album includes a DVD with footage from their European tour. The first press versions included a second disc with two extra songs and had a blue cover instead of brown.

== Reception ==
Hōyoku reached number 22 on the Oricon Albums Chart. Mucc re-recorded "Ame no Orchestra" for their 2017 self-cover album Koroshi no Shirabe II This is Not Greatest Hits, and "Mukashi Kodomo Datta Hitotachi e" for their 2021 compilation album Myojo. "Saishū Ressha" was covered by The Back Horn for the 2017 Mucc tribute album Tribute of Mucc -En-.

== Track listing ==
Disc one
| No. | Title | Lyrics | Music | Length |
|---|---|---|---|---|
| 1. | "Kagayaku Sekai" (輝く世界) | Tatsuro | Miya | 5:26 |
| 2. | "Saru" (サル) | Miya | Miya | 3:31 |
| 3. | "Akasen" (赤線) | Miya | Miya | 3:10 |
| 4. | "Saishū Ressha" (最終列車) | Tatsuro | Miya | 4:27 |
| 5. | "1R" | Tatsuro | Satochi | 4:46 |
| 6. | "Mukashi Kodomo Datta Hitotachi e" (昔子供だった人達へ) | Tatsuro | Satochi | 5:00 |
| 7. | "Tonbi" (鳶) | Miya | Tatsuro, Miya | 3:34 |
| 8. | "Ame no Orchestra" (雨のオーケストラ (Ame no ōkesutora)) | Tatsuro | Yukke | 5:47 |
| 9. | "Komorebi" (こもれび) | Miya, Yukke | Yukke, Miya | 4:42 |
| 10. | "Kumo" (蜘蛛) | Miya | Miya | 2:46 |
| 11. | "Monster" (モンスター) | Tatsuro | Yukke, Miya | 5:15 |
| 12. | "Yasashii Kioku" (優しい記憶) | Tatsuro | Miya | 5:03 |
| 13. | "Kokoro no Nai Machi" (ココロノナイマチ) | Tatsuro | Miya | 4:54 |
| 14. | "Tsubasa" (つばさ) | Tatsuro | Miya | 5:30 |

Disc two (bonus disc)
| No. | Title | Lyrics | Music | Length |
|---|---|---|---|---|
| 15. | "Shadan" (遮断) | Miya | Miya | 3:50 |
| 16. | "Saishū Ressha -70's Ver-" (最終列車～70'S ver.～) | Tatsuro | Miya | 4:05 |
