= Aku (album) =

Studio album by Mucc
- Released: June 10, 2020
- Genre: Alternative metal
- Length: 69:00
- Language: Japanese
- Label: Danger Crue

Mucc chronology
Kowareta Piano to Living Dead (2019)	Aku (2020)	Shin Sekai (2022)

Aku (惡; lit. "Evil") is the fifteenth studio album by Japanese visual kei rock band Mucc, released on June 10, 2020, by Danger Crue. It was released in three editions: the regular edition with sixteen tracks, the limited edition with a bonus DVD and the fan club limited edition with a 48-page booklet.

Aku peaked at the sixth position on weekly charts and first position on daily charts of Oricon Albums Chart.

== Track listing ==
No.	Title	Lyrics	Music	Length
1.	"Aku -Justice-" (惡-JUSTICE-)	Tatsuro	Miya	3:34
2.	"Crack"	Miya	Miya	3:16
3.	"Ameria (Aku Mix)" (アメリア)	Miya	Miya	6:59
4.	"Kamikaze Over Drive" (神風 Over Drive)	Tatsuro	Satochi	2:23
5.	"Kurage" (海月)	Miya	Tooru Yoshida, Miya	4:30
6.	"Friday the 13th"	Tatsuro	Tatsuro, Miya	2:59
7.	"Cobalt"	Miya	Miya	4:16
8.	"Sandman"	Tatsuro	Miya, Yukke	3:10
9.	"Memai" (目眩; feat Hazuki from lynch.)	Miya	Miya, Tatsuro	4:12
10.	"Super Hero"	Tatsuro	Tatsuro	4:30
11.	"Dead or Alive"	Tatsuro, Satochi	Miya, Satochi	3:16
12.	"Jiko Keno" (自己嫌惡)	Miya	Miya	6:08
13.	"Alpha" (アルファ)	Miya	Yukke	4:34
14.	"My World (Aku Mix)"	Miya, Satochi	Miya, Satochi	4:56
15.	"Sei to Shi to Kimi (Aku Mix)" (生と死と君)	Miya	Miya	4:59
16.	"Spica" (スピカ)	Miya	Miya	5:43
Total length:				69:00

Limited edition (DVD)
No.	Title	Length
1.	"Recording of Aku documentary"
2.	"MUCC Interview"

== Personnel ==
- Tatsuro – vocals
- Miya – guitar
- Yukke – bass guitar
- Satochi – drums

=== Additional musicians ===
- Tooru Yoshida – keyboards

== Charts ==
Chart performance for Aku
Chart (2020)	Peak position
Japanese Albums (Oricon)	6
