= Gokusai =

Studio album by Mucc
- Released: December 6, 2006 (JP); February 23, 2007 (EU)
- Genre: Alternative metal; post-grunge; alternative rock; pop rock
- Length: 56:25; 64:17 (with bonus tracks)
- Label: Danger Crue

Mucc chronology
6 (2006)	Gokusai (2006)	Shion (2008)

Singles from Gokusai
- 1. "Gerbera" Released: February 15, 2006; 2. "Ryūsei" Released: May 24, 2006; 3. "Utagoe" Released: August 23, 2006; 4. "Horizont" Released: November 8, 2006

Gokusai (極彩; lit. "Vivid Colors") is the seventh album by Mucc, released on December 6, 2006 in Japan and on February 23, 2007 in Europe. The album presents a more commercial sound, showing clear influences of pop rock. The first press edition comes with a second disc, containing two bonus tracks. These were also included on the single disc of the European release. The album reached number 22 on the Oricon Albums Chart.

== Reception ==
Gokusai reached number 22 on the Oricon Albums Chart. Mucc re-recorded of "Utagoe" and "Ryūsei" for their 2017 self-cover album Koroshi no Shirabe II This is Not Greatest Hits. "Utagoe", "Gerbera", and "Ryūsei" were covered by Kishidan, Sukekiyo and Plastic Tree respectively, for the 2017 Mucc tribute album Tribute of Mucc -En-.

== Track listing ==
No.	Title	Lyrics	Music	Length
1.	"Rave Circus Instrumental" (レイブサーカス instrumental)		Miya	1:42
2.	"Gokusai" (極彩)	Miya	Miya	4:30
3.	"Nageki no Kane" (嘆きの鐘)	Miya	Miya	4:00
4.	"Utagoe" (謡声)	Tatsuro	Satochi	4:04
5.	"Gekkō" (月光)	Miya	Miya	3:58
6.	"Panorama" (パノラマ)	Tatsuro	Satochi	4:16
7.	"Gerbera" (ガーベラ)	Tatsuro	Miya	3:50
8.	"Risky Drive" (リスキードライブ)	Tatsuro	Miya	2:58
9.	"Kinsenka" (キンセンカ)	Satochi	Satochi	4:30
10.	"D.O.G." (ディーオージー)	Tatsuro	Tatsuro, Miya	3:09
11.	"Nijūgoji no Yūutsu" (25時の憂鬱)	Tatsuro	Miya	6:02
12.	"Horizont" (ホリゾント)	Tatsuro, Miya	Yukke, Miya	3:54
13.	"Yasashii Uta" (優しい歌)	Miya	Miya	4:54
14.	"Ryūsei" (流星)	Tatsuro	Miya	4:38
15.	"G.M.C" (bonus track)	Miya	Miya	3:45
16.	"Gerbera Surf Ver." (bonus track)	Tatsuro	Miya	3:52
