= Shion (album) =

Studio album by Mucc
- Released: March 26, 2008
- Genre: Alternative metal; hard rock; alternative rock; dance-rock
- Length: 57:55
- Label: Danger Crue/Universal (JP); Spinefarm Records UK (EU)
- Producer: Miya; Masaji Asakawa & Heigo Tani (Tracks 2, 4 & 7); Hajime Okano (Tracks 6 & 13); Narisaki (Track 10)

Mucc chronology
Gokusai (2007)	Shion (2008)	Kyūtai (2009)

Singles from Shion
- 1. "Libra" Released: March 21, 2007; 2. "Flight" Released: May 2, 2007; 3. "Fuzz" Released: October 31, 2007

Shion (志恩) is the eighth album by Japanese rock band Mucc, released in Japan on March 26, 2008.

== Foreign releases ==
It was released in the United States on November 25, 2008, and in the United Kingdom on October 13, 2008. The UK edition features a live version "Libra" (previously released on the "Flight" single), and the music video for "Fuzz".

== Use in media ==
The song "Fuzz" also appears in the American film Cloverfield.

== Reception ==
Professional ratings
Review scores
Source	Rating
NEO Magazine	4/5 stars
Allmusic	3.5/5 stars

Shion reached number 13 on the Oricon Albums Chart. Mucc re-recorded of "Fuzz" for their 2017 self-cover album Koroshi no Shirabe II This is Not Greatest Hits, and "Nuritsubusunara Enji" for their 2021 compilation album Myojo. "Flight" and "Libra" were covered by Breakerz and Junko Yano respectively, for the 2017 Mucc tribute album Tribute of Mucc -En-.

== Track listing ==
No.	Title	Lyrics	Music	Length
1.	"Suion" (水恩)		Miya	2:16
2.	"Fukurō no Yurikago" (梟の揺り篭)	Tatsuro	Miya	4:26
3.	"Nuritsubusunara Enji" (塗り潰すなら臙脂)	Tatsuro	Satochi, Miya	4:11
4.	"Fuzz" (ファズ)	Tatsuro	Miya	4:49
5.	"Game" (ゲーム)	Tatsuro	Miya	5:46
6.	"Flight" (フライト-Album ver.-)	Tatsuro, Miya	Satochi, Miya	3:44
7.	"Anjelier" (アンジャベル)	Tatsuro	Miya	4:08
8.	"Chiisana mado" (小さな窓)	Miya	Yukke	5:19
9.	"Semishigure" (蝉時雨)	Miya	Miya	3:28
10.	"Shion" (志恩)	Miya	Miya	5:15
11.	"Sorawasure" (空忘れ)	Tatsuro	Satochi, Miya	4:08
12.	"Shiva" (シヴァ)	Miya	Miya	5:03
13.	"Libra" (リブラ-Album ver.-)	Tatsuro	Miya	5:22

== Personnel ==
- Mucc
  - Tatsuro - vocals
  - Miya - guitar and chorus
  - Yukke - bass
  - Satochi - drums
- Atsushi Koike - manipulation (tracks 8 & 12)
- Sakura - percussion (tracks 3 & 8 )
- Crusher Kimura - strings (track 8)
- Shinji Asakura - percussion (track 10)
