= 6 (Mucc album) =

Studio album by Mucc
- Released: April 26, 2006
- Genres: Alternative metal; post-grunge
- Length: 30:46
- Labels: Danger Crue, Gan-Shin (EU)

Mucc chronology
Hōyoku (2005)	6 (2006)	Gokusai (2006)

6 (ろく, Roku) is the sixth studio album by Japanese band Mucc, released on April 26, 2006 in Japan, and on May 12, 2006 in Europe, via Gan-Shin. The album contains nine tracks and has a playing time of 30:46, making it the band's shortest one to date. According to guitarist Miya, the album is a B-side to their previous album Hōyoku. The first press came housed in a digipack featuring different artwork as well. The album reached number 29 on the Oricon chart.

== Track listing ==
No.	Title	Lyrics	Music	Length
1.	"666"		Miya	1:27
2.	"Kūkyo na Heya" (空虚な部屋)	Tatsuro	Miya	4:45
3.	"Akai Sora" (赤い空)	Miya	Miya	3:02
4.	"Haribote no Otona" (はりぼてのおとな)	Tatsuro	Miya	5:23
5.	"Fourty-Six" (フォーティーシックス)	Miya	Miya	2:21
6.	"Kami no Hoshi" (神の星)	Tatsuro	Yukke	2:25
7.	"Haru, Kaze no Fuita Hi" (春、風のふいた日)	Tatsuro	Satochi	3:03
8.	"Yūbeni" (夕紅)	Miya	Satochi	3:05
9.	"Haruka" (遥か)	Tatsuro	Tatsuro	5:18
Total length:				30:46

=== Note ===
- A re-recording of "Yūbeni" was featured on their 2021 best album Myojo.
