= Karma (Mucc album) =

Studio album by Mucc
- Released: October 6, 2010
- Genre: Alternative metal; hard rock; dance-rock; disco
- Length: 60:24
- Label: Danger Crue

Mucc chronology
Kyūtai (2009)	Karma (2010)	Shangri-La (2012)

Singles from Karma
- 1. "Freesia" Released: November 25, 2009; 2. "Yakusoku" Released: June 9, 2010; 3. "Falling Down" Released: September 22, 2010

Karma (カルマ) is the tenth album by Mucc, released on October 6, 2010. It features a variety of genres "mixing the best of many worlds while keeping the sound their own." The album reached number 11 on the Oricon chart. Tracks 2 & 3 were arranged by Miya and Space Walkers, while track 14 was arranged by Miya and Ken from L'Arc-en-Ciel.

== Musical style ==
Karma mixes post-disco and dance with Mucc's usual metal sound.

== Track listing ==
No.	Title	Lyrics	Music	Length
1.	"Chemical Parade"		Miya	1:40
2.	"Falling Down Organic Edition" (フォーリングダウン Organic Edition)	Miya	Miya	4:11
3.	"Zeroshiki" (零色)	Tatsuro	Tatsuro	2:53
4.	"Chemical Parade Blueday" (ケミカルパレードブルーデイ)	Miya	Miya	3:56
5.	"A."	Tatsuro	Tatsuro	4:51
6.	"I Am Computer" (アイアムコンピュータ)	Miya	Miya	4:58
7.	"Karma" (業)	Miya	Miya	3:45
8.	"Daraku" (堕落)	Tatsuro, Rie Eto (English translation)	Tatsuro	4:46
9.	"Circus" (サーカス)	Miya	Satochi	3:55
10.	"Polaris" (ポラリス)	Tatsuro	Yukke	4:50
11.	"Lion" (ライオン)	Miya	Miya	4:18
12.	"Hane" (羽)	Miya	Miya	5:56
13.	"Yakusoku Original Lyric Ver." (約束 Original Lyric ver.)	Tatsuro	Tatsuro	4:14
14.	"Freesia Karma Edit" (フリージア Karma Edit)	Tatsuro	Miya	6:11
Total length:				60:24

== Cover ==
"I Am Computer" was covered by Polysics respectively, on the 2017 Mucc tribute album Tribute Of Mucc -en-.
