= Kowareta Piano to Living Dead =

Studio album by Mucc
- Released: February 13, 2019
- Length: 41:08
- Language: Japanese
- Label: Danger Crue

Mucc chronology
Myakuhaku (2017)	Kowareta Piano to Living Dead (2019)	Aku (2020)

Kowareta Piano to Living Dead (Japanese: 壊れたピアノとリビングデッド; lit. 'Broken Piano and the Living Dead') is the fourteenth studio album by the Japanese rock band Mucc, released on February 13, 2019 by Danger Crue. It is a "horror concept album.

== Recording and production ==
For Kowareta Piano to Living Dead, Mucc recruited keyboardist Tooru Yoshida to the band for a limited time. The songs "Vampire" and "Countdown" were based on about 140 demos from the beginning of the band's career: "There were songs that I could hardly use, but some I could do. We listened to all of them, chose about 20 candidates and selected among them ", said guitarist Miya.

== Commercial performance ==
The album peaked at the sixteenth position on Oricon Albums Chart.

== Track listing ==
Kowareta Piano to Living Dead track listing
No.	Title	Lyrics	Music	Length
1.	"Kowareta Piano" (壊れたピアノ)	Instrumental	Miya	2:01
2.	"Psycho" (サイコ)	Miya	Miya, Yukke	4:00
3.	"Iris" (アイリス)	Miya	Miya	4:03
4.	"Vampire" (ヴァンパイア)	Miya	Miya	4:45
5.	"In the shadows"	Tatsuro	Miya	5:48
6.	"Sekisou" (積想)	Tatsuro	Tatsuro	5:22
7.	"Yuri to Tsubasa" (百合と翼)	Tatsuro, Satochi	Miya, Satochi	4:26
8.	"Countdown" (カウントダウン)	Miya	Miya	6:02
9.	"Living Dead"	Tatsuro	Tatsuro	4:38
Total length:				41:08

== Personnel ==
- Tatsuro – vocals
- Miya – guitar
- Yukke – bass guitar
- Satochi – drums
- Tooru Yoshida – keyboards

== Charts ==
Chart performance for Kowareta Piano to Living Dead
Chart (2019)	Peak position
Japanese Albums (Oricon)	16
