= Myakuhaku =

Studio album by Mucc
- Released: January 25, 2017
- Genre: Alternative metal
- Length: 60:09
- Language: Japanese
- Label: Sony Japan; Gan-Shin
- Producer: Ken, Miya

Mucc chronology
T.R.E.N.D.Y. -Paradise from 1997- (2015)	Myakuhaku (2017)	Kowareta Piano to Living Dead (2019)

Singles from Myakuhaku
- 1. "Yueni, Matenrou" Released: September 10, 2014; 2. "Heide" Released: June 15, 2016; 3. "Classic" Released: September 14, 2016

Myakuhaku (脈拍, lit. "Pulse") is the thirteenth studio album by the Japanese rock band Mucc, released on January 25, 2017, in Japan by Sony Japan and February 10, 2017, in Europe by Gan-Shin. It was produced by Ken from L'Arc-en-Ciel and Miya.

The album's singles are "Yueni, Matenrou", "Heide" and the opening theme of The Seven Deadly Sins: Signs of Holy War, "Classic".

Myakuhaku peaked at the seventeenth position at Oricon Albums Chart.

== Release ==
Myakuhaku was released on January 25, 2017, in Japan, in three editions: limited A, limited B and regular. The limited editions contain a documentary about the album, the band's 20 years and a live DVD of the show MITO GROOVIN'2016. In addition, edition A contains a 60-page bonus booklet and has been limited to 3000 copies. The regular edition contains only the 14-track CD. In Europe, it was released on February 10, 2017, by Gan-Shin.

== Track listing ==
No.	Title	Lyrics	Music	Length
1.	"Myakuhaku" (脈拍)	Miya	Miya	4:51
2.	"Zettai Zetsumei" (絶体絶命)	Miya	Miya	4:40
3.	"Classic"	Yukke, Tatsuro	Yukke	3:49
4.	"KILLEЯ"	Tatsuro	Miya	5:34
5.	"BILLY×2 ～Entwines ROCK STARS～"	Tatsuro	Satochi, Miya	4:04
6.	"Ringo" (りんご)	Miya	Yukke, Miya	5:05
7.	"EMP"	Tatsuro	Miya	5:01
8.	"Yueni, Matenrou" (故に、摩天楼)	Miya	Miya	4:41
9.	"Himitsu" (秘密)	Tatsuro	Yukke	4:24
10.	"Commune" (コミューン)	Miya	Miya	4:19
11.	"Wasurenagusa" (勿忘草)	Tatsuro	Tatsuro	4:15
12.	"Sirius" (シリウス)	Miya	Miya	4:58
13.	"Fuka" (孵化)	Tatsuro	Miya	5:54
14.	"Heide" (ハイデ)	Tatsuro	Miya	7:18
Total length:				60:09

== Personnel ==
- Tatsuro - vocals
- Miya - guitar
- Yukke - bass guitar
- Satochi - drums
- Ken - producer

== Covers ==
"Classic", "EMP", and "Heide" were covered by Flow, Ken, and Roach respectively, on the 2017 Mucc tribute album Tribute Of Mucc -en-.

== Charts ==
Chart performance for Myakuhaku
Chart (2017)	Peak position
Japanese Albums (Oricon)	17
