= T.R.E.N.D.Y. – Paradise from 1997 =

T.R.E.N.D.Y. -Paradise from 1997–

EP by Mucc
- Released: June 24, 2015
- Genre: Alternative Metal, Alternative Rock, Nu-Metal
- Length: 39:52 (Standard Edition), 42:05 (Limited Edition)
- Label: Sony Music

Mucc chronology
| The End of the World (2014) | T.R.E.N.D.Y. -Paradise from 1997– (2015) | Myakuhaku (2017) |

Alternative cover
- Limited edition artwork

T.R.E.N.D.Y. -Paradise from 1997– is Mucc's third EP, released on June 24, 2015. It is also their first EP released through a major label. It was released in two different versions, the limited edition including a bonus DVD with live footage. The EP was written with the concept of combining styles from the 90's with modern elements. The limited edition also contains the hidden track "1997", a track that has since become a staple of their live shows. All of the tracks were debuted live before their release.

== Track listing ==
| No. | Title | Lyrics | Music | Length |
|---|---|---|---|---|
| 1. | "Suiren" (睡蓮) | Tatsuro | Miya | 7:45 |
| 2. | "D・f・D (Dreamer from Darkness)" | Tatsuro | Miya | 5:22 |
| 3. | "B.L.U.E -Tell me KAFKA-" | Miya | Miya | 5:01 |
| 4. | "HATEЯ" | Miya | Miya | 4:42 |
| 5. | "Rainbow" (レインボー) | Miya | Miya | 5:16 |
| 6. | "Rendez-Vous" | Tatsuro | Miya | 5:02 |
| 7. | "TONIGHT" (Limited edition contains hidden track "1997") | Tatsuro | Miya | 6:44 (Standard) 9:06 (Limited) |

Limited Edition Live DVD: MUCC TOUR 2015 "F#CK THE PAST F#CK THE FUTURE"
| No. | Title | Length |
|---|---|---|
| 1. | "ENDER ENDER" |
| 2. | "D・f・D (Dreamer from Darkness)" |
| 3. | "HATEЯ" |
| 4. | "MAD YACK" |

== Personnel ==
- MUCC
  - Tatsuro – Vocals
  - Miya – Guitar, Backing Vocals
  - Yukke – Bass Guitar
  - SATOchi – Drums
- Tetsuya Kanmuri – Guest Vocals on Track 7
- ROACH – Guest Backing Vocals on Tracks 1, 2, 4 and 7
  - Taama
  - Kubocchi
  - Katsuya
  - Daisuke
- SHO (TWISTED HARBOR TOWN) – Guest Backing Vocals on Tracks 1, 2, 4 and 7
- H@L (ARTEMA) – Guest Backing Vocals on Tracks 1, 2, 4 and 7
- AKi (SID) – Guest Backing Vocals on Track 7

== Notes ==
- All writing, arrangement and personnel credits taken from the album insert.
