= The End of the World (Mucc album) =

Studio album by Mucc
- Released: June 25, 2014
- Recorded: 2013
- Genre: Alternative metal; nu metal; hard rock; dance-rock; pop rock
- Length: 46:14
- Label: Sony Music

Mucc chronology
Shangri-La (2012)	The End of the World (2014)	T.R.E.N.D.Y. -Paradise from 1997- (2015)

Singles from The End of the World
- 1. "Halo" Released: September 25, 2013; 2. "World's End" Released: October 30, 2013; 3. "Ender Ender" Released: May 28, 2014

The End of the World (stylized in all caps) is Mucc's twelfth album, and was released on June 25, 2014. It was released in two different versions, the Limited version including a bonus DVD with documentary footage.

== Background ==
In 2013, Mucc began looking for two new members who would participate in recording, photo shoots and interviews. Applicants had to send in five stickers included with CDs, DVDs and other goods, released in commemoration of the band's 15th anniversary along with an application; it was noted that they did not need to know how to play an instrument. The winners were selected by Mucc's four primary members themselves and given stage names, after interviews and reviewing resumes on a live broadcast on Niconico on July 26. Hancho, a Hungarian female study abroad student from the band's native Ibaraki, and Dean, a male office worker from Chiba Prefecture officially joined the band on August 17. However, on September 4, roughly two weeks later, it was announced that both had left the group. Dean left after his parents found out he had joined a rock band by seeing him on TV, and Hancho stated she had achieved her dream of joining Mucc and could now leave to become a fan once more:

"I made my dream of being a member of MUCC come true. Now I want to go back to being a fan.

On December 1, 2013, Mucc gave a free performance in Amerikamura's Triangle Park to an estimated 3,000 fans. On June 25, 2014, the band announced the release of The End of the World and toured for the album.

== Track listing ==
The End of the World track listing
No.	Title	Lyrics	Music	Length
1.	"The End of the World"	Miya	Miya	4:16
2.	"Ender Ender -Album Edit-"	Tatsuro	Miya	4:40
3.	"Ms.Fear"	Miya	Miya	3:33
4.	"Halo"	Miya	Miya	3:40
5.	"Tell Me"	Tatsuro	Tatsuro	4:38
6.	"999 -21st Century World-"	Yukke	Yukke	4:06
7.	"369 -Miroku-" (369 -ミロク-)	Tatsuro	Tatsuro	3:51
8.	"Japanese"	Miya	Miya	4:25
9.	"Hallelujah"	Tatsuro	Miya	4:02
10.	"World's End -In its true light-"	Miya	Miya	4:11
11.	"Shinde Hoshii Hito" (死んでほしい人)	Tatsuro	Tatsuro, Miya	5:00
Total length:				46:14

Notes

- "The End of the World", "Ender Ender", "Halo" and "Japanese" are stylized in all caps.
