= Hōmura Uta =

Studio album by Mucc
- Released: Japan: 6 September 2002; France: 10 October 2005; Europe: 19 May 2006
- Recorded: 2002; Bazooka Studio (locations B1, B2, B3, and B4); Faradise Studio Komazawa
- Genre: Alternative metal; grunge; alternative rock; nu metal
- Length: 1:38:02; 1:08:06 (Reissue); 1:45:24 (Second reissue)
- Label: Danger Crue (JP); Gan-Shin (EU)
- Producer: Miya

Mucc chronology
Tsūzetsu (2001)	Hōmura Uta (2002)	Zekū (2003)

Singles from Hōmura Uta
- 1. "Akaban" Released: July 15, 2001; 2. "Aoban" Released: July 15, 2001; 3. "Fu wo Tataeru Uta" Released: January 21, 2002

Hōmura Uta (葬ラ謳, lit. "Funeral Song") is the second studio album by the Japanese rock band Mucc, released on September 6, 2002. It is the first album to be released by their sublabel Shu, under Danger Crue. Hōmura Uta was reissued two times, with the 2004 version reaching number 48 on the Oricon Albums Chart. Mucc re-recorded the entire album and released it as Shin Hōmura Uta (新葬ラ謳, lit. "New Funeral Song") on August 9, 2017.

== Overview ==
Hōmura Uta was released on September 6, 2002, as the first album by Mucc's record label Shu, a sublabel of Danger Crue. The album cover was illustrated by manga artist Junji Ito. The first pressing includes two discs; the second of which contains two additional songs and a 24-minute comment on the album. Hōmura Uta sold out quickly, and the following month a reissue was released on October 18, without the second disc but with the first one enhanced with the music video for the song "Zetsubō". On August 17, 2004, a second reissue was released, including both discs from the first release, plus a bonus track on the first one.

== Reception ==
The 2004 reissue of Hōmura Uta reached number 48 on the Oricon Albums Chart. The 2017 re-recording, Shin Hōmura Uta, peaked at number 29 on the chart.

Mucc re-recorded "Mae e" for their 2014 single "Ender Ender". Two re-recordings of "Sekai no Owari" were featured on their 2017 live-limited single "Ieji". The entire album was re-recorded and remastered as a self-cover album titled Shin Hōmura Uta on August 9, 2017.

== Track listing ==
Disc one
No.	Title	Lyrics	Music	Length
1.	"Hōmura Uta" (ホムラウタ)		Miya	1:22
2.	"Zetsubō" (絶望)	Miya	Miya	4:17
3.	"Shiawase no Shūchaku" (幸せの終着)	Miya	Ishioka no Kin-san, Gin-san	4:49
4.	"Kimi ni Sachi Are" (君に幸あれ)	Tatsuro	Miya	6:31
5.	"Boku ga Hontō no Boku ni Taekirezu Tsukutta Hontō no Boku" (僕が本当の僕に耐え切れず造った本当の僕)	Miya	Yukke	5:15
6.	"Mama" (ママ)	Tatsuro	Tatsuro	4:35
7.	"Kurayami ni Saku Hana" (暗闇に咲く花)	Tatsuro	2126	6:38
8.	"Uso de Yugamu Shinzō" (嘘で歪む心臓)	Tatsuro	Yukke	5:27
9.	"Oyoge! Taiyaki-kun" (およげ！たいやきくん)	Hiro Takada	Juichi Sase	4:50
10.	"Mae e" (前へ)	Tatsuro	Satochi	4:49
11.	"Kokuen" (黒煙)	Tatsuro	Miya	2:46
12.	"Suimin" (スイミン)	Miya	Miya	5:47
13.	"Kaeranu Hito" (帰らぬ人)	Miya	Miya	4:03
14.	"Zutazuta" (ズタズタ)	Miya	Miya	6:50
15.	"Suisō" (水槽) (2004 reissue bonus track)	Tatsuro	Miya	7:13

Disc two
No.	Title	Lyrics	Music	Length
1.	"Sekai no Owari" (世界の終わり)	Mucc	Mucc	2:03
2.	"Yume no Machi" (夢の街)	Tatsuro	Miya	3:10
3.	"Seisaku Shūryō Comment (Ibaraki-ben)" (制作終了コメント(茨城弁))			24:41
