= Classic (Mucc song) =

Single by Mucc

from the album Myakuhaku
- B-side: "Yesterday Once More"
- Released: September 19, 2016
- Genre: Alternative rock
- Length: 17:04
- Label: Sony Japan
- Composer: Yukke
- Lyricists: Yukke, Tatsuro
- Producer: Ken

Mucc singles chronology
"Heide" (2016)	"Classic" (2016)	"Ieji" (2017)

"Classic" is the 35th single by the Japanese rock band Mucc, released on September 19, 2016, in three editions by Sony Japan. It is the opening theme of the anime series The Seven Deadly Sins: Signs of Holy War. The title track was composed by bassist Yukke and the single was produced by Ken, guitarist of L'Arc-en-Ciel.

== Composition ==
"Classic" was composed by Mucc bassist Yukke, who admitted being a fan of the series The Seven Deadly Sins: "When it was decided [that the song would be the opening theme] I was very happy". He claims that it took about a month to compose the song, while receiving tips from the other members. The demo version of the song was more similar to an anime song than the current one, Yukke asked producer Ken to transform it into a song more similar to Mucc, although the initial melody has not been changed.

The lyrics were written by Yukke too and co-written by vocalist Tatsuro, who emphasized that much of it was actually done by the bassist. According to Yukke, the lyrics were based on "the ability to protect the weakest, as presented in the anime". Tatsuro also said that while singing an original version of the lyrics, he felt that "something was not right" and asked the bassist to rewrite it. Yukke chose the title "Classic" "with the hope of being a song that will remain forever even if it disappears, as an important thing that everyone has."

== Release ==
On June 28, simultaneously with the release of Heide's music video on YouTube, the release of "Classic" was announced and that would be the opening theme for The Seven Deadly Sins: Signs of Holy War anime series.

The song was first introduced on August 3 on Tokyo FM's Jack in the Radio, where the singer Tatsuro performed as a presenter.

On August 28 Mucc released a TV edit version, with 1:30 in length, on streaming platforms like iTunes. On September 14, three teasers of the music video were released on the official Mucc YouTube channel, with a background voice narrated by the voice actor of the protagonist Meliodas, Yuki Kaji.

As usual for the band, a regular edition containing only the CD and a limited edition accompanying the bonus DVD were released. However, this time a third edition was released: the anime edition, containing a poster of Nanatsu no Taizai. This edition was limited to purchase until the end of December 2016.

== Commercial performance ==
"Classic" peaked at the 15th place on Oricon Singles Chart and remained for four weeks.

== Track listing ==
No.	Title	Lyrics	Music	Length
1.	"Classic"	Yukke, Tatsuro	Yukke	3:52
2.	"Yesterday Once More"	Tatsuro	Miya	4:34
3.	"Heide -TeddyLoid Remix-" (ハイデ -TeddyLoid Remix-)	Tatsuro	Miya, TeddyLoid	5:36
4.	"Classic TV Edit"	Yukke, Tatsuro	Yukke	1:30
5.	"Classic TV Edit -Original Karaoke-"	Yukke, Tatsuro	Yukke	1:30
Total length:				17:04

=== Limited edition ===
DVD

No.	Title	Length
1.	"CLASSIC music video"
2.	"KILLEЯ from Fuka (孵化)"
3.	"Tatsuro KILLEЯ (Tatsuro angle view original mix)"
4.	"Tatsuro KILLEЯ (Tatsuro angle view Semari Kuru Tatsuro mix)"
5.	"Miya KILLEЯ (Miya angle view original mix)"
6.	"Miya KILLEЯ (Miya angle view Semari Kuru Miya mix)"
7.	"YUKKE KILLEЯ (YUKKE angle view original mix)"
8.	"YUKKE KILLEЯ (YUKKE angle view Semari Kuru YUKKE mix)"
9.	"SATOchi KILLEЯ (SATOchi angle view original mix)"
10.	"SATOchi KILLEЯ (SATOchi angle view Semari Kuru SATOchi mix)"

== Personnel ==
- Tatsuro - vocal
- Miya - guitar
- Yukke - bass
- Satochi - drums
- Ken - producer

== Charts ==
Chart performance for Classic
Chart (2016)	Peak position
Japan (Oricon)	15

== Covers ==
In 2017, the Japanese band Flow covered the song for the tribute album Tribute of Mucc -en-.
