= Shangri-La (Mucc album) =

- Standard edition cover

Studio album by Mucc
- Released: November 28, 2012
- Genres: Nu metal; dance-rock; hard rock; metalcore
- Length: 54:37
- Label: Sony Music

Mucc chronology
Karma (2010)	Shangri-La (2012)	The End of the World (2014)

Singles from Shangri-La
- 1. "Arcadia feat. Daishi Dance" Released: November 23, 2011; 2. "Nirvana" Released: March 7, 2012; 3. "Mother" Released: October 31, 2012

Shangri-La (Japanese: シャングリラ, Hepburn: Shanguri-Ra) is the eleventh studio album by Japanese rock band Mucc, released on November 28, 2012. It continues the sound used in their previous album Karma, this time with elements of metalcore (making a return for the first time since Kyūtai).

== Overview ==
The album's first single, "Arcadia", features DJ Daishi Dance and was released on November 23, 2011.

Its second single, "Nirvana", was released on March 7, 2012, and was used as the opening theme song of the Inu x Boku SS anime adaptation. Its writer, Miya, was a fan of the original manga and said composing the music and writing the lyrics came naturally.

The third and final single, "Mother", was released on October 31, 2012, and was an ending theme of Naruto Shippuden. Its B-side "Negative Dancer" features the audience of Mucc's September 13, 2012 concert singing the chorus.

Shangri-La was released in three different versions, all of them with the thirteen regular tracks; the Limited and Complete Production versions including a bonus CD with recordings of their 15th Anniversary tour.

"G.G" was used as an image song for the Japanese release of the 2012 film The Woman in Black.

"Kyōran Kyoshō -21st Century Baby-" was remixed and used as the theme of the 2013 live-action film adaptation of Fuan no Tane.

== Track listing ==
Original track listing
No.	Title	Lyrics	Music	Length
1.	"Mr. Liar"	Miya	Miya	4:16
2.	"G.G."	Tatsuro	Miya	4:25
3.	"Arcadia featuring Daishi Dance" (アルカディア)	Miya	Miya	4:51
4.	"Nirvana -Shangri-La Edit-" (ニルヴァーナ-Shangri-la Edit-)	Miya	Miya	4:00
5.	"Honey" (ハニー)	Miya	Miya	3:31
6.	"Schūchaku no Kane" (終着の鐘)	Miya, Tatsuro	Tatsuro, Miya, Yukke	3:23
7.	"Pure Black" (ピュアブラック)	Tatsuro	Yukke	3:41
8.	"Kyōran Kyoshō -21st Century Baby-" (狂乱狂唱~21st Century Baby~)	Tatsuro	Tatsuro	3:26
9.	"Marry You"	Tatsuro	Tatsuro	4:09
10.	"Yozora no Craypas" (夜空のクレパス)	Tatsuro	Miya	4:07
11.	"You & I"	Miya	Satochi, Miya	4:18
12.	"Mother"	Miya	Miya	3:58
13.	"Shangri-La" (シャングリラ)	Miya	Miya	6:28
69.	"Mad Yack" (hidden track)	Miya	Miya	4:19

=== Disc 2 - Limited Edition CD ===
-Mucc 15th Anniversary year Live(s)-"97-12″ 2012.09.13 Sendai Rensa

1. Kokuen
2. Fuzz -Thunder Groove Ver.-
3. Gekkō
4. Tōei
5. Shōfu
6. Kokoiro
7. Akatsuki Yami
8. Ieji
9. Ryūsei
10. Yasashii Uta

=== Disc 2 - Complete Production Edition CD ===
-Mucc 15th Anniversary year Live(s)- "97-12″ 2012.09.16 Zepp Nagoya

1. Fukurō no Yurikago
2. Anjelier
3. Zetsubō
4. Gentō Sanka
5. Kare ga Shinda Hi
6. 4-gatsu no Rengesō
7. Nijūgoji no Yūutsu
8. Tsuki no Yoru
9. Ame no Orchestra
10. Kurutta Kajitsu (Warau)

=== Note ===
- Re-recordings of "Mr. Liar" and "Mad Yack" were featured on their 2017 self-cover album Koroshi no Shirabe II This is Not Greatest Hits.

== Covers ==
"Mr. Liar", "Nirvana", and "Honey" were covered by Hysteric Panic, Granrodeo, and Band-Maid respectively, on the 2017 Mucc tribute album Tribute of Mucc -En-. Band-Maid's version of "Honey" is also included on the standard edition of their album World Domination.

"Nirvana" was covered by Fantôme Iris, a fictional visual kei rock band from the multimedia franchise Argonavis from BanG Dream! and was added to the game AAside on March 31, 2021. The song was also performed on their first solo live as a real band, Fantôme Iris 1st Live -C'est la vie!- on May 5, 2021. The full version of their cover is included on the album Argonavis Cover Collection -Mix-, which was released on November 17, 2021.
