= Tsūzetsu =

Studio album by Mucc
- Released: January 7, 2001
- Genre: Alternative metal
- Length: 44:24
- Label: Peanuts

Mucc chronology
Tsūzetsu (2001)	Hōmura Uta (2002)

Singles from Tsuuzetsu
- 1. "Shōfu/Hai" Released: June 9, 2000

Tsūzetsu (痛絶; lit. "Painful") is the debut studio album by the Japanese rock band Mucc, and was released on January 7, 2001 on the independent label Peanuts.

== Releases ==
The first pressing of the album included a bonus track and a sticker, but was limited to only five thousand copies. A second pressing was released on June 17 the same year, titled Tsūzetsu ~Inshōchigai~ (痛絶 ～印象違～), with the hidden track absent, a different track order and no sticker. A third pressing released on June 10, 2002, had the same track order as the second pressing, but included a bonus track different from the first pressing.

== Track listing ==
First press track order
No.	Title	Lyrics	Music	Length
1.	Untitled		Miya	0:47
2.	"Itai Tegami" (イタイ手紙)	Miya	Miya	4:05
3.	"Shōfu" (娼婦)	Tatsuro	Miya	5:45
4.	"Chintsūzai" (鎮痛剤)	Tatsuro	Miya	5:36
5.	"Hai" (廃)	Miya	Miya	5:13
6.	"Suna no Shiro" (砂の城)	Tatsuro	Tatsuro	5:37
7.	"Yoru" (夜)	Tatsuro	Yukke	2:29
8.	"Haitoku no Hito" (背徳の人)	Tatsuro	Miya, Satochi	4:30
9.	"Mōmoku de Aruga Yue no Sogaikan" (盲目であるが故の疎外感)	Miya	Miya	5:23
10.	"Danzetsu" (断絶)	Miya	Miya	4:58

First press bonus track
No.	Title	Lyrics	Music	Length
11.	"Kyoujin" (狂人)	Miya	Miya

Third press bonus track
No.	Title	Lyrics	Music	Length
11.	"Kurutta Kajitsu (Warai)" (狂った果実(笑))	Miya	Miya

=== Note ===
- A re-recording of "Shōfu" was featured on their 2006 single Horizont. It was re-recorded again on the 2020 limited single Shōfu to commemorate 20th anniversary of their first single.
- The album was re-recorded as a self-cover album titled Sin Tsūzetsu released on August 9, 2017.
