= Sukekiyo =

Japanese rock band

- Origin: Japan
- Genres: Experimental rock; progressive rock; post-rock
- Years active: 2013–present
- Label: Firewall Div.
- Members: Kyo; Takumi; Uta; Yuchi; Mika
- Website: sukekiyo-official.jp

Sukekiyo (stylized as sukekiyo and also referred to in katakana form as スケキヨ) is a Japanese rock band formed in 2013 by Dir En Grey vocalist Kyo. It is sometimes referred to as a supergroup as every member of the band is or has been in other well-known acts in the Japanese visual kei movement, although only Kyo is currently active in another band.

== History ==
Sukekiyo was formed as a side project by Kyo along with members of other Japanese rock bands. The name derives from Seishi Yokomizo's novel The Inugami Clan. The band's activities are by periods as Kyo's main project Dir En Grey is still his priority.

In November 2014, they announced a new mini-album called Vitium, which contained 8 new tracks and released on February 4, 2015. The limited edition came with a second disc that includes collaborations with other artists such as X Japan vocalist Toshi and actor Hiroshi Mikami.

On June 21, 2017, Sukekiyo released their second full-length studio album, Adoratio. Daniel Ash, guitarist for the iconic goth rock band Bauhaus, is one of the many features and collaborations on this album. He provided with an exclusive remix of the track "maneira", on Disc 2. During that same year, for the November 22 Mucc tribute album Tribute of Mucc -En-, they covered "Gerbera".

== Members ==
- Kyo (京): vocals, programming (Dir En Grey, Petit Brabancon)
- Takumi (匠): guitar, piano (formerly of Rentrer en Soi, manipulator for Dir En Grey)
- Uta: guitar (formerly of 9Goats Black Out)
- Yuchi: bass (formerly of Kannivalism, Wing Works)
- Mika (未架): drums (formerly of Rentrer en Soi, Forbidden Days Rhapsody)

== Discography ==
Albums

- Immortalis (2014)
- Adoratio (2017)
- Infinitum (2019)
- Erosio (2023)

EPs

- Vitium (2015)

Singles

- "The Daemon's Cutlery" (2013)
- "sukekiyo 二〇十四年公演「別れを惜しむフリは貴方の為」" (sukekiyo 2014 live: 'wakare wo oshimu furi wa anata no tame') (2014)
- "耳ゾゾ" (Mimi Zozo) (2015)
- "Anima" (2016)
- "黝いヒステリア" (Aoguroi Hysteria) (2017)
- "こうも違うモノなのか、要するに (1 Shot Analog Recording -Demo Ver. 20171121-)" (Kō mo chigau mono nanoka, yōsuru ni (1 Shot Analog Recording -Demo Ver. 20171121-)) (2018)
- "Kisses" (2018)
- "Salus" (2021)
- "Amor" (2022)
- "possess" (2026)

Demo Tapes

- "接触" (Sesshoku) (2020)
- "夢見ドロ" (Yumemi Doro) (2021)
- "触れさせる" (Furesaseru) (2021)
- "Valentina" (2021)
- "愛した心臓" (Aishita Shinzō) (2021)

Live Albums

- Persuasio // 2015.2.28 sukekiyo 2015 live "The Unified Field"-Vitium- (2015)
- Mutans // 2016.7.17 sukekiyo 2016 live「裸体と遊具、泥芝居に賛歌の詩」-漆黒の儀- (Mutans // 2016.7.17 sukekiyo 2016 live "Ratai to Yūgu, Doroshibai ni Sanka no Shi"-Shikkoku no Gi-) (2016)
- Passio (2019)
- Liquefacio (2020)
- Luxuria (2021)

Best-of Albums

- Ius Cerebri / Sinistro Cerebrum (2024)

== Videoclip ==
Their first video for the song "Aftermath" was released on January 1, 2014 through iTunes. A second video for the song "In All Weathers" was released on the bonus Blu-ray Disc of Immortalis, along with "Aftermath".

List of Video Clips:

- "Aftermath" (2014)
- "In All Weathers" (2014)
- "雨上がりの優詩" (Ameagari no Yūshi) (2015)
- "Focus" (2015)
- "Anima" (2016)
- "12時20分金輪際" (Jūniji Nijuppun Konrinzai) (2016)
- "艶" (En) (2017)
- "襞謳" (Hidauta) (2017)
- "猥雑" (Waizatsu) (2019, also as "Another Edit" version)
- "ただ、まだ、私。" (Tada, Mada, Watashi.) (2019, also as "Another Edit" version)
- "Candis" (2021, also as "Another Edit" version)
- "モザイク少女" (Mozaiku Shōjo) (2022)
- "Moan" (2023)
- "訪問者X" (Hōmonsha X) (2023)
- Valentina (2025)
- "漂白フレーバー" (Hyouhaku flavor) (2025)
