= Zekū =

Studio album by Mucc
- Released: September 3, 2003
- Genre: Grunge; alternative metal; nu metal; experimental rock
- Length: 50:14
- Label: Universal Gear/Shu (JP); Gan-Shin (EU)
- Producer: Miya

Mucc chronology
| Hōmura Uta (2002) | Zekū (2003) | Kuchiki no Tō (2004) |

Singles from Zekū
- 1. "Waga, Arubeki Basho" Released: May 20, 2003

Zekū (是空) is the third studio album released by Japanese band Mucc on September 3, 2003. Released by Universal Gear, it is their major label debut. Zekū reached number 17 on the Oricon Albums Chart.

== Recording and release ==
In 2022, guitarist and principal songwriter Miya recalled that recording Zekū was painful as they were in the studio until 5 a.m. every day. He also insisted on recording with tape, but had to splice it in so many different places because he made mistakes in his performance, that the powder came out. They originally had a ¥10 million budget, but costs went up to ¥15 million because recording took so long.

Miya said that prior to Zekū (2003) and Kuchiki no Tō (2004), his lyrics were about past events and "traumas" he experienced, but with these two albums he wrote about present inner feelings within the band. Despite audiences loving the shows, he seems to regret having done this as he speculated that he drank a lot on those tours so he would not have to face what he was expressing on stage.

The first press limited edition release included a DVD, different artwork, and a bonus one track CD. The European version, released on May 19, 2006, features two bonus tracks which were b-sides from the single "Waga, Arubeki Basho".

== Reception ==
Zekū reached number 17 on the Oricon Albums Chart. Mucc re-recorded "Bōzenjishitsu", "1979", and "Ranchū" for their 2017 self-cover album Koroshi no Shirabe II This is Not Greatest Hits. "Bōzenjishitsu" and "Ranchū" were covered by Lynch. and Rottengraffty respectively, for the 2017 Mucc tribute album Tribute of Mucc -En-.

== Track listing ==
Disc one
| No. | Title | Lyrics | Music | Length |
|---|---|---|---|---|
| 1. | "Shinsō" (心奏) | | Miya | 2:22 |
| 2. | "Bōzenjishitsu" (茫然自失) | Miya | Miya, Yukke | 4:33 |
| 3. | "Waga, Arubeki Basho" (我、在ルベキ場所) | Miya | Miya | 5:21 |
| 4. | "Shōgyō Shisōkyō Jidai Kōseikyoku (Heiseihan)" (商業思想狂時代考偲曲(平成版)) | Miya | Miya | 3:55 |
| 5. | "Hikanshugisha ga Warau" (悲観主義者が笑う) | Miya | Miya, Yukke | 4:33 |
| 6. | "Shi Shite Katamari" (死して塊) | Tatsuro | Yukke, Satochi | 4:09 |
| 7. | "Sōshin no Koe" (双心の声) | Tatsuro | Miya | 5:04 |
| 8. | "1979" | Tatsuro | Satochi | 3:13 |
| 9. | "Nagekidori to Dōkejin" (嘆き鳥と道化人) | Tatsuro | Miya, Satochi | 3:56 |
| 10. | "Kono Sen to Sora" (この線と空) | Miya | Miya | 4:16 |
| 11. | "Kugatsu Mikka no Kokuin" (9月3日の刻印) | Miya | Miya | 5:20 |
| 12. | "Ranchū" (蘭鋳) | Tatsuro | Miya | 3:41 |

Disc two (First press limited edition bonus disc)
| No. | Title | Lyrics | Music | Length |
|---|---|---|---|---|
| 1. | "Aoki Haru" (青き春) | Miya | Miya | 11:27 |

European Edition Bonus Tracks
| No. | Title | Length |
|---|---|---|
| 13. | "Hakanakutomo" (儚くとも) ("Waga, Arubeki Basho" B-Side) | 5:20 |
| 14. | "Ieji" (家路) ("Waga, Arubeki Basho" B-Side) | 5:19 |
