= Mucc =

Japanese visual kei rock band

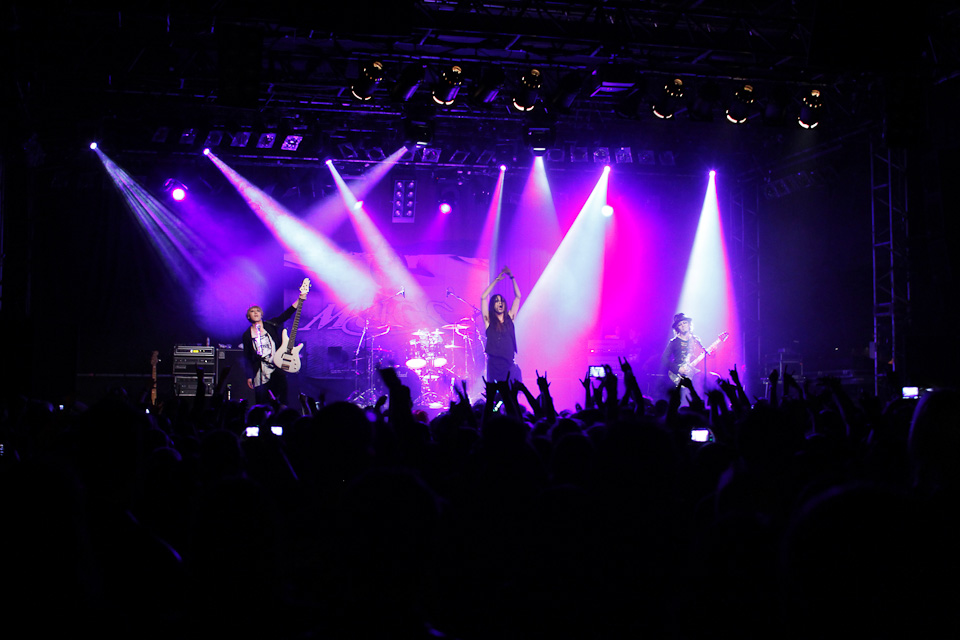
- Mucc performing in Paris in 2009

Background information
- Also known as: 69
- Origin: Ibaraki Prefecture, Japan
- Genres: Alternative rock; alternative metal
- Works: Mucc discography
- Years active: 1997–present
- Labels: Misshitsu Neurose; Danger Crue/Shu; Universal; Sony; Tokuma Japan; Gan-Shin (EU); Spinefarm (EU)
- Members: Tatsuro; Miya; Yukke
- Past members: Hiro; Satochi
- Website: 55-69.com

Mucc (Japanese: ムック, Hepburn: Mukku; stylized as MUCC) is a Japanese visual kei rock band, formed in Ibaraki Prefecture in 1997. The band's current lineup consists of lead vocalist Tatsuro, guitarist Miya, and bassist Yukke. Former members include bassist Hiro, who departed the band in 1999, and drummer Satochi, who retired from the entertainment industry in 2021.

Mucc have released 17 studio albums, with Aku (2020) becoming their most commercially successful album. Kerrang! included their fourth studio album Kuchiki no Tō (2004) on its list of 13 essential Japanese rock and metal albums.

== History ==
=== Early years and releases (1997–2005) ===
Mucc written in katakana

Mucc was formed in 1997 by guitarist Miya, vocalist Tatsuro (then called "Tattoo"), bassist Hiro, and drummer Satochi. High school students who had been friends since primary school. They had their first concert at the Shimamura Music store in Mito, Ibaraki on May 4. Satochi was only a support musician, but decided to officially join after the concert because of how much fun he had. The name Mucc is often believed to have been taken from a character in the children's TV show Hirake! Ponkikki. However, Miya stated he chose the name because it is easy to remember and is not something you associate with music. When he later learned that the English word "muck" means "filth", he thought that was also good. The band is also known by the nickname "69" since the numbers six and nine can be pronounced "mu" and "ku", respectively, in Japanese. They have played with this number throughout their career, such as dubbing June 9 "Mucc Day", and providing live broadcasts that last 690 minutes. Fans of the band are known as "Muccer" (夢烏(ムッカー), Mukkā).

Originally playing covers of bands such as The Blue Hearts and Glay, Malice Mizer and The Mad Capsule Markets Mucc handed out their first demo tape, No!?, in December 1997. After graduating high school, the band moved to Tokyo. On March 3, 1998, they handed out copies of their second demo tape, Aika, and on December 1, they gave out a limited 100 copies of their third, Tsubasa wo Kudasai. In 1999, Hiro left the band on February 14 and was replaced on bass by Miya's childhood friend Yukke on February 22. In July, Mucc had their first tour, where they handed out demo tapes of Aka at every venue. On December 25, they had their first official release, the EP Antique. On June 8, 2000, Tattoo changed his stage name to his current name of Tatsuro. They released their first album, Tsūzetsu, on January 7, 2001. It was followed by the EP Aishū on December 25. In 2002, the band signed to Danger Crue, establishing their own sublabel Shu (朱), and released their second album, Hōmura Uta. That year they held a concert titled En (えん), which featured acts from different genres. They have continued to hold En events sporadically since.

Mucc signed to Universal in 2003, and released their major label debut single "Waga, Arubeki Basho" on May 3. Third studio album Zekū followed on September 3. Their first live DVD, Nihon Rettou Konton Heisei Kokoro no Naka, was released on December 10. The band held a guerrilla live at Shinjuku Station on June 9, 2004, in front of an estimated 5,000 people. Their fourth studio album Kuchiki no Tō was released on September 1 and supported by the Sōran Shūkyō fall tour, which ended on October 31 at Hibiya Open Air Concert Hall. In January 2005, Mucc held a joint tour with Balzac. Kuchiki no Tō Live at Roppongi, their first live album, was released on January 26.

=== International activities (2005–2011) ===
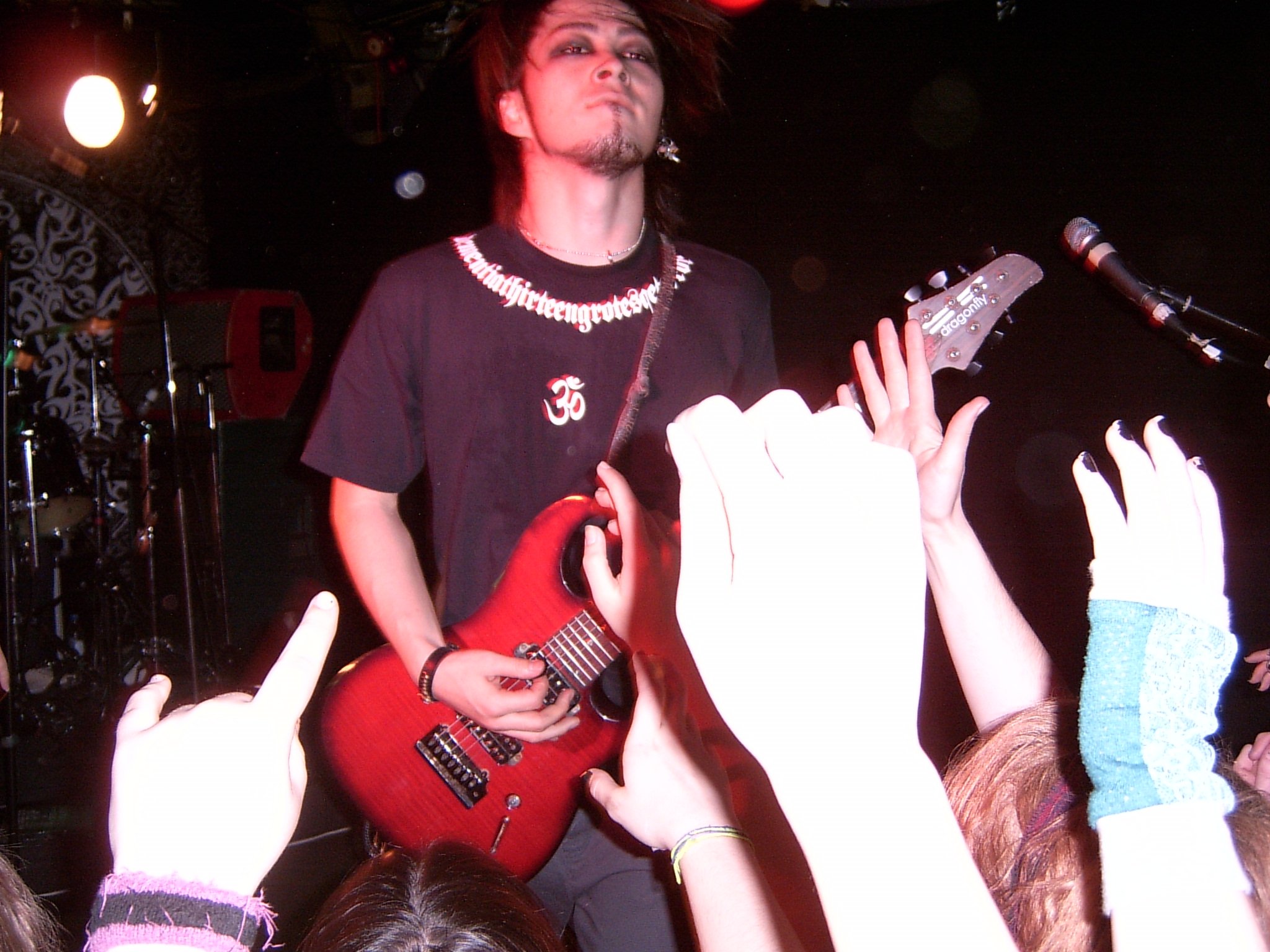
Miya performing with Mucc in London in 2007

Mucc debuted in Europe in August 2005, including a performance at Wacken Open Air. They released the album Hōyoku on November 23. Mucc released two albums in 2006, 6 and Gokusai, and performed in the United States at the Otakon anime convention. They ended a world tour on June 6 with their first concert at the Nippon Budokan. 2007 marked Mucc's 10th anniversary. They released two compilation albums, Best of Mucc and Worst of Mucc; the latter includes rare songs from their indie years. In addition to opening for Guns N' Roses on the Japanese leg of their 2007 World Tour, Mucc gave performances in Shanghai, in Finland at Provinssirock, and in the US at JRock Revolution Festival. They also performed at the Abstinence's Door #001 event hosted by D'erlanger, and their song "Chain Ring" was used as the ending theme to the Zombie-Loan anime adaptation. They held a special 10th anniversary concert at the Ibaraki Prefectural Cultural Center in November.

Throughout 2008, Mucc participated in the Taste of Chaos 2008 tour, which initially stopped at forty cities across the United States and Canada from February to May, along with fellow Japanese bands D'espairsRay and the Underneath. In March, they released the album Shion. After returning to Japan, Mucc performed at the hide memorial summit at Ajinomoto Stadium alongside groups such as X Japan and Luna Sea, and began their own nationwide Rainy Rave tour before performing at the Sweden Rock Festival in June. The Taste of Chaos tour went to Europe in October, and then to Japan in November, where Mucc was the headliner. Mucc then performed at The Fillmore New York at Irving Plaza on December 7, 2008 and the House of Blues in Los Angeles on December 10.

Following the March 2009 release of their ninth studio album Kyūtai, Mucc held a sold-out 16-date nationwide tour from May to June. After performing in Sweden at Metaltown Festival in June, their Solid Sphere Tour began with a live in Russia on October 3, before featuring their first shows in Latin America (Chile and Mexico). The band completed the tour on November 16 in Japan at the JCB Hall. Mucc started 2010 with a concert on February 14 at the NHK Hall, before traveling to Taiwan for the March 14 Megaport Music Festival. The single "Yakusoku" was used as the opening theme to Night Raid 1931. The band performed at Summer Sonic on August 8. Returning to being an indie band on Danger Crue Records, Mucc released Karma on October 6. Three days later, they performed at a cultural festival at Yukke's alma mater Ibaraki Prefectural Ogawa High School, which was closing. The Chemical Parade tour took place between October and December.

A European leg of the Chemical Parade tour was held in five countries throughout January 2011, while two Asian shows took place in April. At their May 21 and 22 Nippon Budokan shows, the band announced they would be signing to major label Sony Music Associated Records. The single "Akatsuki" was first sold exclusively at those concerts, before later being available as a digital download with all proceeds donated to aid the victims of the 2011 Tōhoku earthquake and tsunami. On July 15, Mucc performed at a concert commemorating the first anniversary of the death of Daisuke, former singer of the band Kagerou. They also performed at the V-Rock Festival '11 held at Saitama Super Arena on October 23, before releasing the single "Arcadia" which featured DJ Daishi Dance in November.

=== 15th Anniversary and Six Nine Wars (2012–2016) ===
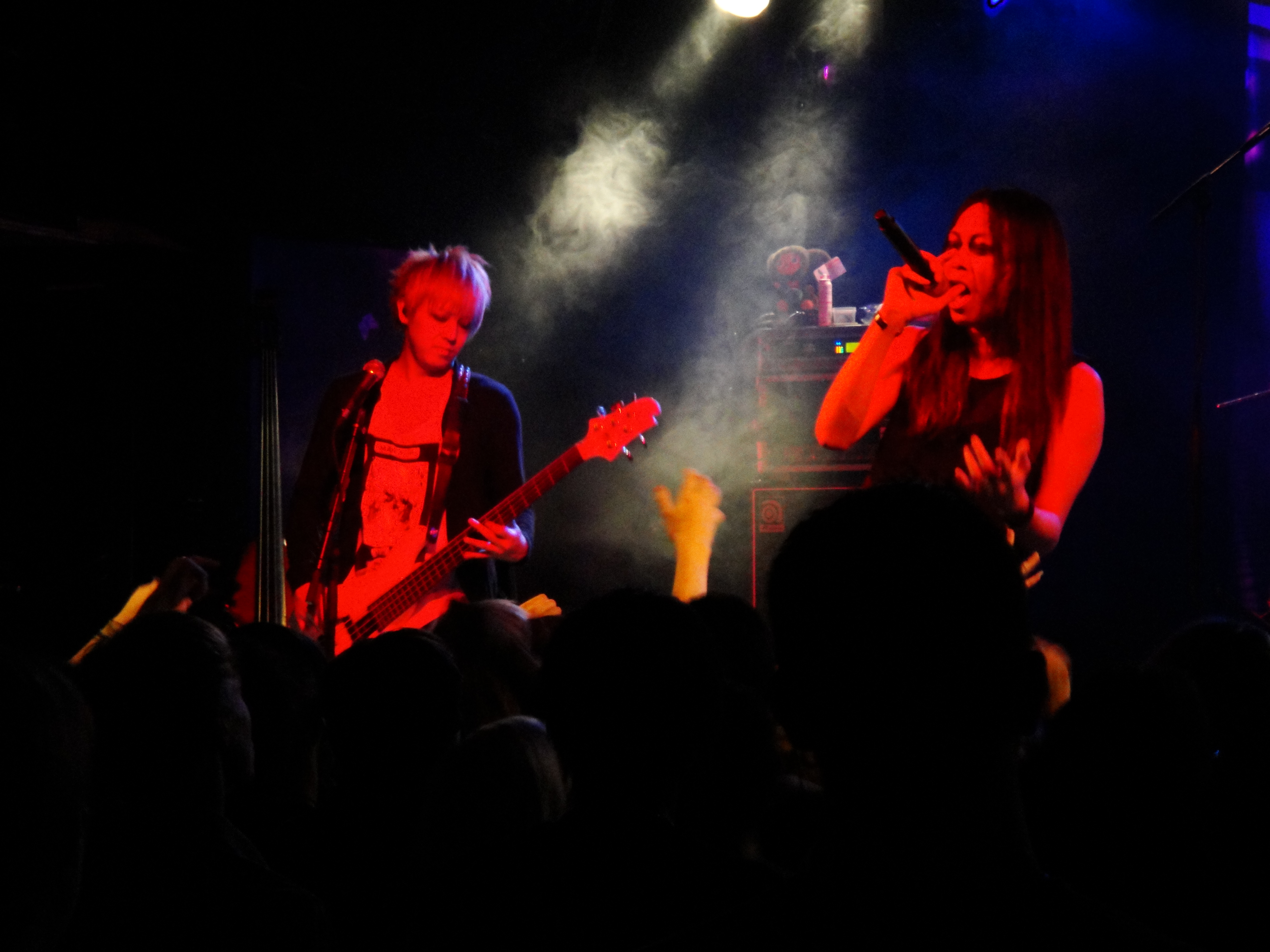
Yukke and Tatsuro performing in Malmö in 2009

Mucc's next single, "Nirvana", was released on March 7, 2012 and used as the opening theme song for the Inu x Boku SS anime. They performed at all three dates of Cali Gari's Chikashitsu tour that same month, as well as an April 30 Jealkb concert. Mucc covered "Jupiter" for July's Parade II -Respective Tracks of Buck-Tick-. On May 4 they performed a concert in front of 40 fans at Shimamura Music in Mito, the same location they played their first show 15 years earlier. Their 15th anniversary live, Mucc vs ムック vs Mucc, took place at Makuhari Messe's International Exhibition Halls 1–3 on June 9. The estimated four-hour show was separated into three parts; 1997–2002 -Misshitsu-, 2002–2007 -Shisei-, and 2007–2012 -Kodō-. An album titled Aishū no Antique, composed of remastered songs from their early demo tapes and the EPs Antique and Aishū, was sold at the show, but later received a nationwide release on August 22. Also in August 2012, the video game Mucc o Tobasu Yatsu (MUCCを飛ばすやつ) was released on the App Store. The band members took part it its creation, with Tatsuro drawing the characters. A 15th anniversary tour of live houses took place throughout September. The single "Mother" was released on October 31, and was an ending theme of Naruto Shippuden, while its B-side "Negative Dancer" features the audience of their September 13 concert singing the chorus. Mucc's eleventh studio album, Shangri-La, was released on November 28. Its song "Kyōran Kyoshō -21st Century Baby-" was remixed and used as the theme of the live-action film adaptation of Fuan no Tane. The Shangri-La tour took place between December 2012 and March 2013, with a special concert on June 7 that marked the end of Mucc's 15th anniversary celebrations. Mucc also performed at Makuhari Messe for Ozzfest on May 12.

"G.G." by the band is the image song for the Japanese version of the 2012 film The Woman in Black.

In 2013, Mucc began looking for two new members who would participate in recording, photo shoots and interviews. Applicants had to send in five stickers included with CDs, DVDs and other goods, released in commemoration of the band's 15th anniversary along with an application; it was noted that they did not need to know how to play an instrument. After interviews and reviewing resumes on a live broadcast on Niconico on July 26, the winners were selected by Mucc's four primary members themselves and given stage names. Hancho, a Hungarian female study abroad student from the band's native Ibaraki, and Dean, a male office worker from Chiba Prefecture officially joined the band on August 17. However, on September 4, roughly two weeks later, it was announced that both had left the group. Dean left after his parents found out he had joined a rock band by seeing him on TV, and Hancho stated she had achieved her dream of joining Mucc and could now leave to become a fan once more. Mucc performed at Shibuya-AX for Angelo's Intersection of Dogma event on August 16, and at World Memorial Hall on October 20 for Vamps' Halloween Party 2013. The band held the 2 Days Circuit Hypnos & Thanatos tour, which featured two consecutive shows at seven venues between October and December. The October 30 single "World's End" was the opening theme song of Meganebu!. On December 1, Mucc gave a free performance in Amerikamura's Triangle Park to an estimated 3,000 fans. Police stopped the show early due to the large number of people that gathered.

On January 26, 2014, Mucc performed at SiM's Dead Pop Festival. For seven months beginning in March, the band held an installment in their Six Nine Wars -Bokura no Nana-kagetsu Kan Sensō- concert event series each month. Episode 1 MuP Lives were fan club-only and lives produced by each member. April's Episode 2 VS consisted of a two-man tour where each of the nine dates included another band; either The Telephones, The Back Horn, Rottengraffty, Fake?, Sebastian X, or Straightener. Episode 3 Thanatos & Thanatos Shi no Kami Sairin was a one-man tour in May. June's three-man tour, Episode 4 Triangle, featured three acts at each venue; Mucc and Merry were at each show, while the third was either Sug, LM.C, or Vistlip. With the release of Mucc's twelfth studio album, The End of the World, on June 25, Episode 5 was the album's July tour. Armageddon was Episode 6 and consisted of a two-man tour with a different act at each venue; Alexandros, Kishidan, Granrodeo, Buck-Tick, Sid, D'erlanger, Golden Bomber, Michael, and Geek Sleep Sheep. The September 10 single "Yueni, Matenrou" was the opening theme song of The Kindaichi Case Files R. The Six Nine Wars event series finished with The End, a concert at the first gymnasium of Yoyogi National Gymnasium on September 23.

Mucc's F#ck the Past F#ck the Future tour took place in April 2015, before its European leg was held in May. On June 9 and 10, Mucc and Rottengraffty held joint lives titled Mucc Day and Rotten Day. The two were joined by Cali Gari the first night and Alexandros the second. The EP T.R.E.N.D.Y. -Paradise from 1997- was released on June 15, and Mucc performed at the second day of Luna Sea's Lunatic Fest. on June 28. At Studio Coast on July 18, Mucc held a free live during the day, and the final of their F#ck the Past F#ck the Future tour at night. They held the three-date March on the Darkness joint tour with lynch. between August 31 and September 21, and performed at an event hosted by Plastic Tree on October 12. On December 27, Mucc faced Sid in the main event of Maverick DC's Battle Arena in Budokan, where each band alternated playing songs before joining together for the last two. Mucc made the song "Brilliant World" digitally available on December 24 for a limited time as a Christmas gift to fans.

Between January 23 and April 1, 2016, Mucc and Aki (bassist of Sid) held a joint tour titled M.A.D, which also featured other acts and guests. Mucc performed at Dappe's Rock in Jōsō on May 1, a concert organized by Toshi-Low of Brahman to help revitalize Ibaraki Prefecture after flooding the previous year. On June 25, 2016, Mucc launched a nationwide tour that ended in September but was an early lead up to their 20th anniversary the following year. After Ken took part in several shows on their M.A.D tour, Tatsuro conceived the Party Zoo ~Ken Entwines Naughty Stars~ tour centered around the guitarist. It took place between September 11 and October 9 and also featured Mucc, A9, Baroque and others. Mucc released the single "Classic" on September 19, and it was used as the opening theme song of The Seven Deadly Sins: Signs of Holy War. They performed at the visual kei rock festival Visual Japan Summit at Makuhari Messe on October 16, and at Knotfest Japan on November 6.

=== 20th Anniversary and Satochi's departure (2017–2021) ===
2017 marked Mucc's 20th anniversary. After the release of their thirteenth studio album Myakuhaku on January 25, they gave a special free live performance on February 4, where only people who bought the special edition of the album were eligible to attend. On March 29, they released the compilation albums Best of Mucc II and Coupling Best II. On May 1, Mucc were appointed ambassadors of both Ishioka, Ibaraki (where Miya and Yukke are from) and Mito, Ibaraki (where Tatsuro and Satochi are from). They were tasked with promoting Ibaraki Prefecture after it ranked last four years in a row in a survey on the attractiveness of prefectures. Mucc sold the limited single "Ieji" at the concert at Ibarakiken Bunkacenter Large Hall on May 4, and their two 20th anniversary concerts at the Nippon Budokan that were separated by years; 97–06 on June 20, and 06–17 on June 21. They also released three self-cover albums, beginning with Shin Tsūzetsu and Shin Hōmura Uta on August 9. The third was September 13's Koroshi no Shirabe II: This is Not Greatest Hits, the title of which was taken from Buck-Tick's similar Koroshi no Shirabe: This Is Not Greatest Hits. It was supported by a five-date tour that ended on October 10. Mucc covered "March 5" by Plastic Tree for the cover album Transparent Branches released on September 6, and "Crazy4You" by D'erlanger for the tribute album Stairway to Heaven released on September 13. A tribute album to Mucc titled En (縁) and featuring 22 artists, was released on November 22. It was supported by the En 7 tour, which was held with bands that contributed to the album, such as Dezert, Flow, and Band-Maid. The tour ended on December 27, where Mucc hosted a special festival at the Nippon Budokan to end their 20th anniversary with eight of the other acts. They also hosted a year-end countdown event in Ibaraki on News Years Eve with many other artists. With the end of 2017, Mucc returned to being an independent band on Danger Crue Records yet again.

They sold the cassette "Jiko Keno Demo ~Dirty Ver.~" at every night of their June 2018 Lock on Snipe Tour #1: Hokkaido-gata Shūkan 6 Days, while "Jiko Keno Demo ~Clean Ver.~" was released digitally on June 11. They released the single "Jigen Bakudan" on July 25, 2018. Mucc's Lock on Snipe Tour #2: Shikoku-gata Shūkan 4 Days took place in October, while #3: Hokuriku-gata Shūkan 6 Days took place in December. The members of the band were four of the 76 people to make cameo appearances in the music video for Flow's song "Oneness". Mucc held an eight-date joint tour with Dezert, titled Is This The "Fact"?, throughout January 2019. Under the name "DEZERMUCC", the two bands collaborated on a two-track CD sold on the tour. For February 13's concept album Kowareta Piano to Living Dead, Mucc recruited keyboardist Tooru Yoshida as a limited-time member. The album was based on 140 of the band's early demos. It was supported by a Zepp tour that ended on April 1, and a hall tour that took place between May and June. Throughout the second half of 2019, they held 33 concerts as part of Lock on Snipe Tours #4–8 and released four singles limited to 6,940 copies total. Each one was written by a different band member and released at a concert held on the 40th birthday of its songwriter. The three-date Lock on Snipe Tour #9 took the band to Shanghai and Taipei in December. On December 28, Mucc presented Trigger in the Box at Yoyogi National Gymnasium. It featured other acts such as Hyde, 44 Magnum, Ling Tosite Sigure, and Oldcodex.

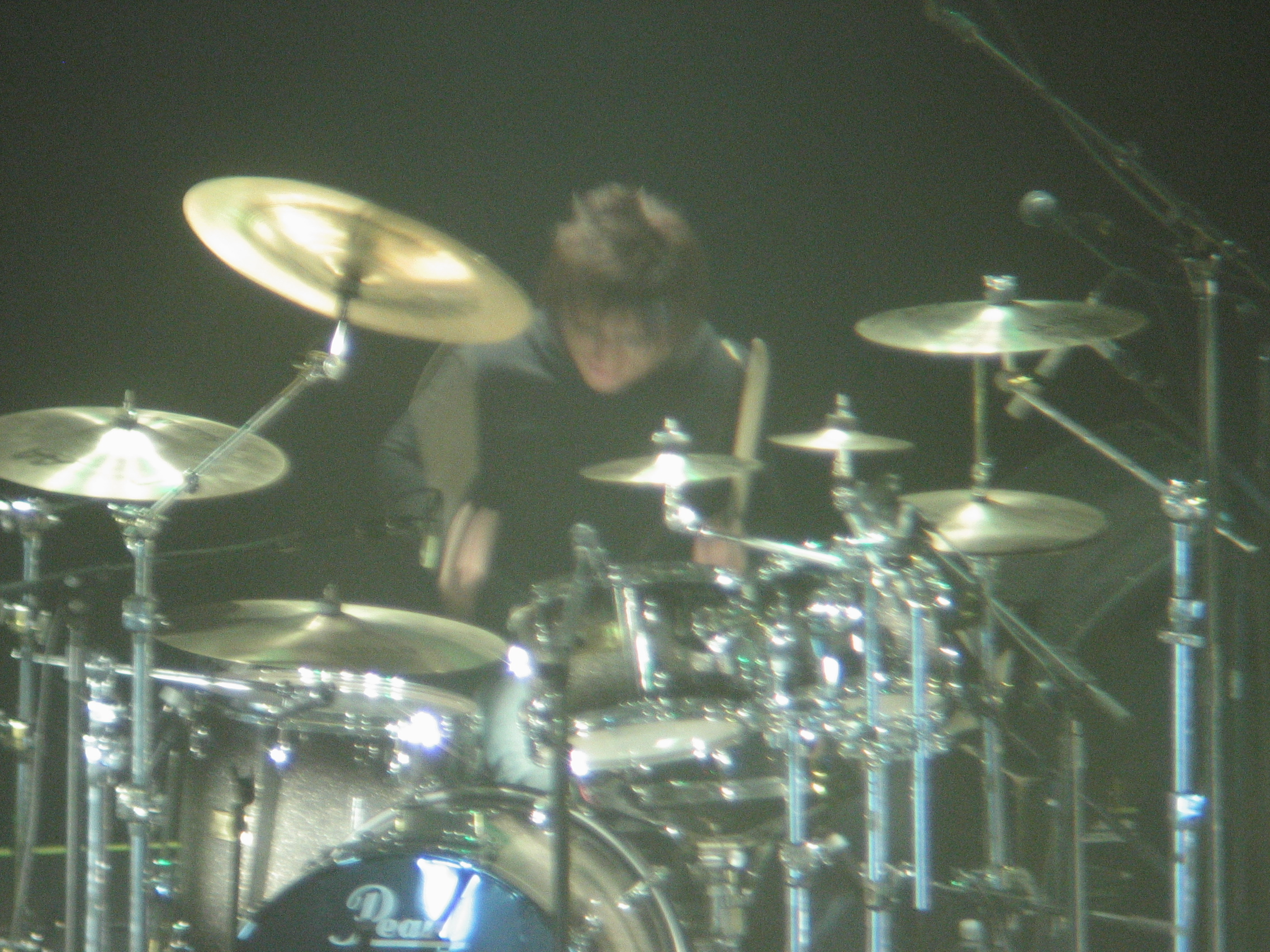
After 24 years in Mucc, Satochi retired from the music industry in 2021.

From January 10 to February 9, 2020, Mucc performed the Lock on Snipe Tour #10. Due to the COVID-19 pandemic, they had to cancel April's Lock on Snipe Tour #11 in Europe and their June 21 concert at Pia Arena MM. They contributed a cover of "Mezmerize" to the May 13 Granrodeo tribute album Rodeo Freak. The band released the made-to-order single "Shōfu 2020", which contains four different recordings of their first single "Shōfu" from various points in their career, on June 9 to celebrate its 20th anniversary. Mucc's fifteenth studio album Aku was released the following day. They held ~Fight Against COVID-19 #2–3~ "Aku - The Broken Resuscitation" no-audience live streams on June 21 and September 20. Their December 27 show at the Nippon Budokan was the band's first concert with an audience in 10 months. On December 2, 2020, Mucc announced that Satochi, who had been their drummer for 23 years, would be leaving the band in spring 2021 and cease activities as a professional musician. His last tour with the band, Mucc Tour 202X Aku - The Brightness World, began in February 2021, but its final four shows were rescheduled to August after Japan declared a state of emergency as a result of the pandemic and Satochi tested positive for COVID-19. The final two concerts were postponed again due to the pandemic and took place on October 2 and 3 at The Hirosawa City Hall in the band's home prefecture of Ibaraki. The compilation album Myōjō was released on April 21 during the tour. All of its songs were either composed or co-composed by Satochi, with four of them newly re-recorded, while the lyrics to the new title track are credited to the whole band.

=== 25th Anniversary and Tokuma Japan (2021–present) ===
A day after Satochi's departure, Mucc released new artist pictures showing them as a trio. The double A-side single "Goner/World" was released in November 2021. 2022 marks the 25th anniversary of Mucc's formation. They began celebrating with an acoustic live on May 4. The band released their sixteenth studio album, Shin Sekai, on June 9. Its tour, which has the subtitle Beginning of the 25th Anniversary, took place from June 11 to August 28. For the anniversary installment En event, En 8 on September 6, Mucc decided to choose The Back Horn and Cock Roach as the participates because they also have ties to Ibaraki. The first leg of Timeless, their 25th anniversary tour, took place from October 9 to December 14. They played a setlist centered on songs from their Zekū (2003) and Kuchiki no Tō (2004) albums. On December 21, Mucc released the mini-album Shin Sekai Bekkan, which is composed of outtakes from Shin Sekai and songs written during its tour. They held two special 25th anniversary lives on February 6 and 14, 2023, which also marked the first time in about three years that the audience could cheer aloud, as it was previously not allowed due to COVID-19 guidelines. Three more legs of the Timeless tour also take place throughout 2023. From March 4 to May 6, Mucc played songs from their Hōyoku (2005) and Gokusai (2006) albums. Songs from Shion (2008) and Kyūtai (2009) were played from June 9 to August 21. From October 1 to November 11, they played a setlist centered on songs from Karma (2010) and Shangri-La (2012). Additionally, Mucc held a two-man live with Deadman at Spotify O-East on July 28. The two bands released a split single at the show, with Mucc's contribution being a song called "Shi no Ubugoe". Between August 17–24 Mucc held the three-date Akumu 69 two-man tour with Nightmare. A grand final to their 25th anniversary tour was held at the Tokyo International Forum Hall A on December 28, where they were joined by special guests Ken and Sakura. They also released the album Timeless on that same day. It features the singles they sold only at concerts on the tour, "Shi no Ubugoe", and self-covers of four older songs.

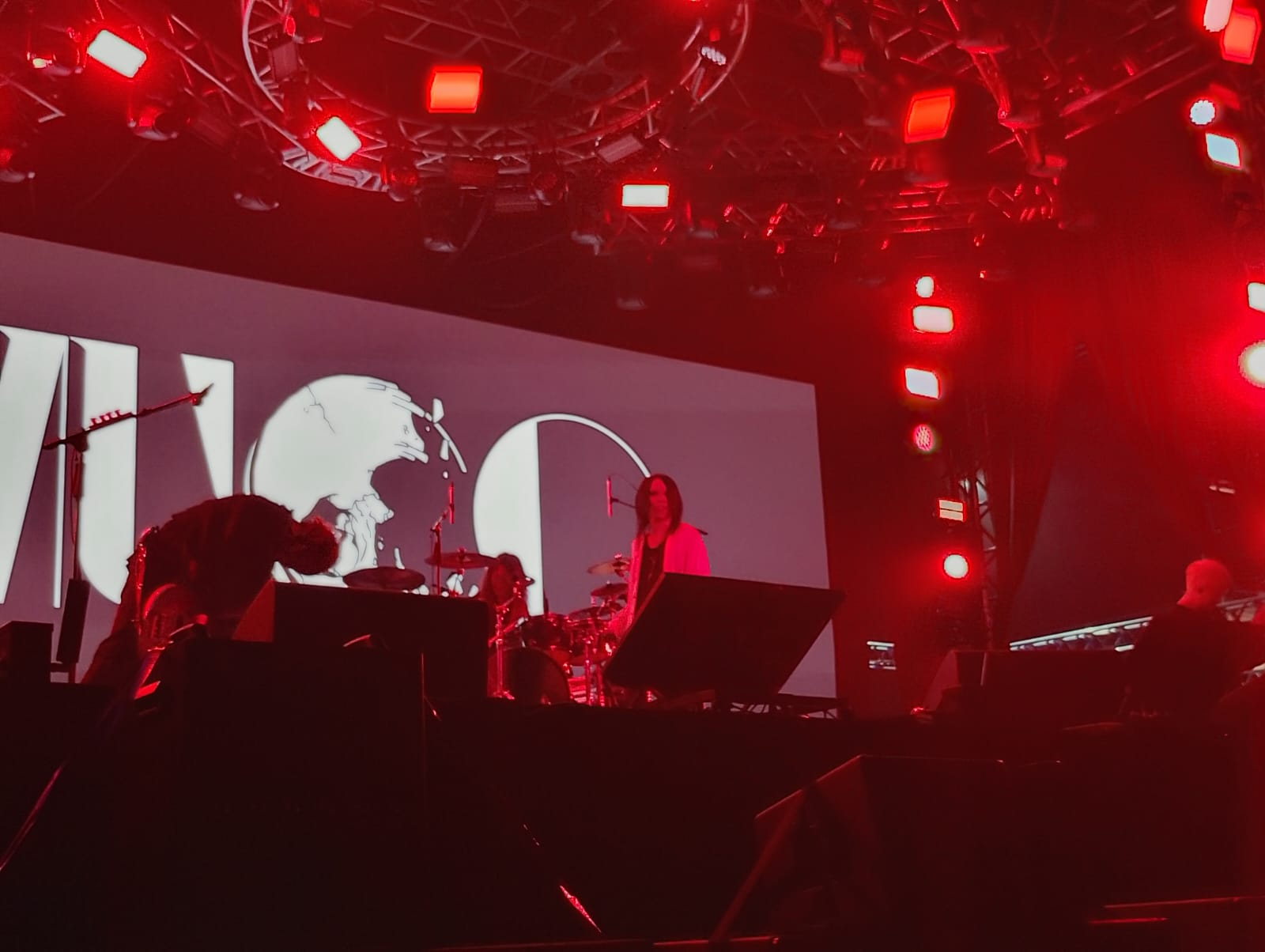
Mucc at Anime Friends in July 2026; their first show in Brazil and their first on the American continent since 2009

On April 1, 2024, Mucc announced that they had signed with major record label Tokuma Japan Communications. As an April Fools' Day joke, the band photos accompanying the announcement featured the members in makeup and costumes that recall the visual kei scene of the 1990s. Their first release on the new label was the single "Ai no Uta" on June 4. The band continued the retro aesthetic by releasing a version of the single on 8 cm CD, and in a music video they created for its B-side "Violet". From June 9 to August 4, they held the Love Together tour, with all but the first two dates featuring a support act; either Kizu, Nogod, Amai Bōryoku, Vistlip, Chaqla., Mama., Jiluka, Arlequin, Divers Croix, or Dezert. Before ending the tour with two solo concerts at Yokohama Bay Hall on August 10 and 11, Mucc performed at LuckyFes on July 14. They then hosted the Luv Together 2024 event at Ex Theater Roppongi on September 16, which featured An Cafe and Yuki from Raphael among its performers, before beginning another tour titled Daydream, which lasted from November 5 to December 22. Mucc released the digital extended play Invader EP on December 4. They then released the album 1997 on April 2, 2025, and began the Daydream 1997 tour three days later. Yukke's birthday concert at Club Citta on November 5 was a two-man live featuring Mucc and La'Mucc, the name given to their 1990s alter ego. Leading up to the show, a backstory for the fictional band was revealed; consisting of vocalist T.I.G, guitarist Miyabi (雅) and bassist Yume, they had announced this would be their disbandment concert 31 years earlier in 1994. A single by La'Mucc, "Eyes", was sold at the concert.

Mucc's New Year's Eve countdown concert on December 31, 2025, was their last with Allen as support drummer. In February 2026, they announced former Acid Android member Yasuo would support them for shows on March 1 and April 16, former Alexandros drummer Satoyasu Shomura would support them for gigs on April 5 and 19, while Nocturnal Bloodlust drummer Natsu supported them on June 13 and July 11. Mucc played at the Anime Friends convention in São Paulo on July 3, which was their first show in Brazil and their first performance on the American continent since 2009. They also made an appearance on the first day of the B7Klan J-Rock Festival in Paris on July 11, as the second headliner of the first day, alongside bands like Moi dix Mois, Versailles and Jiluka. They also performed two solo concerts before and after the festival, in Berlin and Helsinki. The gig in Berlin marked their first European show in 11 years, while the Helsinki date was their first in Finland in 15 years.

== Musical style ==
Mucc is known for switching between music genres and styles frequently. The February 2024 issue of Rockin'On Japan wrote that, ever since their formation in 1997, they have "maintained their own aesthetic, while pursuing music and rock with intellectual curiosity, creative planning, and bold actions, all without being restrained by the boundaries of genres or scenes." Akane Ogawa of Real Sound wrote that this has brought the band recognition and fans outside of the visual kei scene. As examples of their diversity, she cited "Utagoe" (2006) as a punk song, "Fuzz" (2007) as dance rock, "Arcadia" (2011) for incorporating EDM, and "Ender Ender" (2014) for combining metalcore and electronica. Ogawa also noted use of melody lines that evoke melancholy such as those found in folk and kayōkyoku songs. Miya, the principal songwriter of Mucc's music, said he personally likes bands that are ever-changing and play a wide variety of genres. When asked if they worry about this alienating fans, the guitarist has stated on a couple of occasions that they do not care and simply do what they want. When composing songs, Miya said he often starts with the beat. He then creates the basic outline of the chords and melody, before thinking of the overall arrangement. Despite being a guitarist, Miya stated that he gives the instrument the least amount of thought. He has no particular connection to guitar, he just happened to choose it as the tool to express his music. He also explained that Mucc shapes songs together as a band, so any song he starts to write will end up different in the end. Tatsuro, one of the principal lyricists, said the band's lyrics are written after the music. He listens to a melody and takes inspiration from that, but is also inspired by everyday things; "what I see, what I feel and things like that."

Miya cited Yōsui Inoue and X Japan as influences. Tatsuro named Buck-Tick as a Japanese band he likes, while Yukke cited Anzen Chitai. Satochi cited Helloween drummer Ingo Schwichtenberg as an influence. After moving to Tokyo at the end of the 1990s, Miya started listening to Western music and became inspired by Slipknot and Korn. Korn frontman Jonathan Davis influenced him to pursue intense personal expressions in Mucc. According to Ed of Real Sound, Mucc already had a unique musicality by the time of their 1999 demo "Shūka", where they fuse the nu metal of Korn with Shōwa era kayōkyoku. He also wrote that due to the weight of their lyrics, they were already recognized as one of the heaviest bands in visual kei. Miya said prior to Zekū (2003) and Kuchiki no Tō (2004), his lyrics were about past events and "traumas" he experienced, but with those two albums he wrote about present inner feelings within the band. Despite audiences loving the shows, he seems to regret having done this as he speculated that he drank a lot on those tours so he would not have to face what he was expressing on stage, and stated that there is one song on Kuchiki no Tō that he will no longer play. Speaking of his lyrics in 2009, Miya said "I used to write the lyrics only about the things that are totally disastrous, but now I'm not in the mood to write that kind of lyrics. I have grown out of that. As I've gotten older, I've figured out some solutions to the problem and I take that into the lyrics. Miya said he does not write English lyrics because he does not understand the language and using them for their sound alone would not be the same; "If the words I write don't have a soul, then they can't become a song". Tatsuro said that previously he wrote lyrics as a spokesman of the band, "I can't help but think about them and I think that those nuances were put in somewhere", but he did not think about that at all for Shion (2008) and its lyrics are more personal.

Natalie described Karma (2010) as featuring a new sound for the band that mixes disco and digital sounds with heavy rock. Miya said he became interested in folk music after focusing on melody, and that this led to Mucc including elements of dance music in their material. Miya described the 2015 EP T.R.E.N.D.Y. -Paradise from 1997- as a concept work because it features references to the music the members listened to in the 1990s. 2019's Kowareta Piano to Living Dead is also a concept album, with the theme of horror. Yukke said that horror has always been a part of Mucc's repertoire, but it was nice to dive into it head on. Miya cited Korn as the reason he started using seven-string guitars. He said while they allow him to play a large range of music, they do not work very well on downtunings. In 2004, Miya said he rarely plays guitar solos because he does not really like them. He remarked that they are fine if they are like interludes, but he finds it embarrassing to go out front and command attention. However, Mucc's album Shin Sekai (2022) has many guitar solos because he decided not to use any synthesizers on it. For the album, Miya said he would often use a modern approach to retro-sounding songs, and vice versa. The members of Mucc often perform barefoot. Tatsuro said he got the idea after seeing Cocco's April 20, 2001 performance on Music Station, where the barefooted singer abruptly left the studio after finishing her song. He further explained that this was in Mucc's indie days when they had no money; whenever they were putting together new costumes, the shoes were typically the most expensive part, but as a visual kei band they could not simply wear sneakers.

== Members ==
Current members

- Tatsuro (逹瑯) – lead vocals, occasional harmonica (1997–present)
- Miya (ミヤ) – guitars, backing vocals (1997–present)
- Yukke – bass guitar, upright bass, backing vocals (1999–present)

Former members

- Hiro – bass guitar, backing vocals (1997–1999)
- Satochi (SATOち) – drums, percussion, backing vocals (1997–2021)

Support members

- Tooru Yoshida (吉田トオル) – keyboards, piano (2017, 2019–present)
- Allen – drums (2021–2025)

== Discography ==
Studio albums

- Tsūzetsu (痛絶; 2001)
- Hōmura Uta (葬ラ謳; 2002)
- Zekū (是空; 2003)
- Kuchiki no Tō (朽木の灯; 2004)
- Hōyoku (鵬翼; 2005)
- 6 (2006)
- Gokusai (極彩; 2006)
- Shion (志恩; 2008)
- Kyūtai (球体; 2009)
- Karma (カルマ; 2010)
- Shangri-La (シャングリラ; 2012)
- The End of the World (2014)
- Myakuhaku (脈拍; 2017)
- Kowareta Piano to Living Dead (壊れたピアノとリビングデッド; 2019)
- Aku (惡; 2020)
- Shin Sekai (新世界; 2022)
- Timeless (2023)
- 1997 (2025)
