= Kyūtai =

Studio album by Mucc
- Released: March 4, 2009
- Recorded: November 18–December 12, 2008
- Genre: Alternative metal; hard rock; alternative rock; metalcore
- Length: 48:18
- Label: Universal
- Producer: Miya, Ken

Mucc chronology
| Shion (2008) | Kyūtai (2009) | Karma (2010) |

Singles from Kyūtai
- 1. "Ageha" Released: August 27, 2008; 2. "Sora to Ito" Released: January 28, 2009

Professional ratings
Review scores
| Source | Rating |
|---|---|
| NEO Magazine | 4.5/5 stars |

Kyūtai (球体, lit. "Sphere") is the ninth album by Mucc, released on March 4, 2009. Daisuke from Kagerou sings the chorus on "Hōkō". Tracks 3 and 10 were produced with Ken from L'Arc-en-Ciel. Miya's mother sings the chorus on the 7-minute song "Sanbika", as the song was written about the death of his grandmother. The album reached number 12 on the Oricon chart.

== Track listing ==
Original track listing
| No. | Title | Lyrics | Music | Length |
|---|---|---|---|---|
| 1. | "Kyūtai" (球体) | | Miya | 1:49 |
| 2. | "Hōkō" (咆哮) | Miya | Miya | 3:40 |
| 3. | "Ageha" (アゲハ) | Miya, Tatsuro | Miya, Tatsuro | 3:58 |
| 4. | "Hide and Seek" (ハイドアンドシーク) | Tatsuro | Miya | 3:30 |
| 5. | "Kagerō" (陽炎) | Tatsuro | Satochi | 5:00 |
| 6. | "Lemming" (レミング) | Miya | Satochi | 4:39 |
| 7. | "Oz" (オズ) | Miya | Miya | 3:36 |
| 8. | "Fuyū" (浮游) | Tatsuro | Yukke | 4:05 |
| 9. | "Sanbika" (讃美歌) | Miya | Miya | 7:33 |
| 10. | "Sora to Ito" (空と糸) | Tatsuro | Miya | 4:12 |
| 11. | "Hanabi" (hanabi) | Tatsuro | Miya | 6:11 |
| Total length: | | | | 48:18 |

== Other editions ==
Edition A: album plus bonus DVD: Live performance at The Fillmore, Irving Plaza in New York
Edition B: album plus bonus DVD: Documentary footage
