= Danger Crue Records =

- Parent company: Maverick D.C. Group
- Founded: July 2, 1981
- Status: Active
- Distributors: Avex Group (2006–2012); Sony Music Distribution (since 2012)
- Genre: Rock, heavy metal
- Country of origin: Japan
- Location: Tokyo
- Official website: Official website

Danger Crue Records is a Japanese visual kei independent record label located in Tokyo, Japan. It was originally the record label of the Danger Crue music office, both founded in 1981. According to D'erlanger drummer Tetsu, Danger Crue was formed for the heavy metal band 44Magnum. The first release by Danger Crue was the album Insane by Reaction in July 1985. In April 2000, the office changed its name to the Maverick D.C. Group but continues to run the Danger Crue Records label.

In 2002, Maverick D.C. held a concert to celebrate the 20th anniversary of Danger Crue. It has since become an annual year-end event under the name Jack in the Box since 2007, derived from the nickname of Maverick D.C. president Masahiro Oishi. On December 27, 2021, Jack in the Box celebrated Danger Crue's 40th anniversary at the Nippon Budokan.

== Artists ==
- 44Magnum
- Acid android
- Alsdead
- Blaze
- Bug
- CLØWD
- Creature Creature
- D.I.D.
- DIV
- D'erlanger (1989)
- Dead End
- Der Zibet
- Die in Cries
- Earthshaker
- Girugamesh
- Grand Slam
- Heaven's
- Kameleo
- Ken
- L'Arc-en-Ciel (1992–1993)
- Lions Heads
- Mucc, on their own sub-label Shu (2002, 2009–2010, 2017–present)
- Naniwa Exp
- Optic Nerve
- Petit Brabancon
- Ra:IN
- Reaction
- Roach
- Sid (2003–2008)
- Solid
- Sons of All Pussys
- Tatsuro
- UNiTE.
- Velvet Spider
- Zoro
