= Tatsuro (singer) =

Japanese singer (born 1979)

Tatsuro 逹瑯
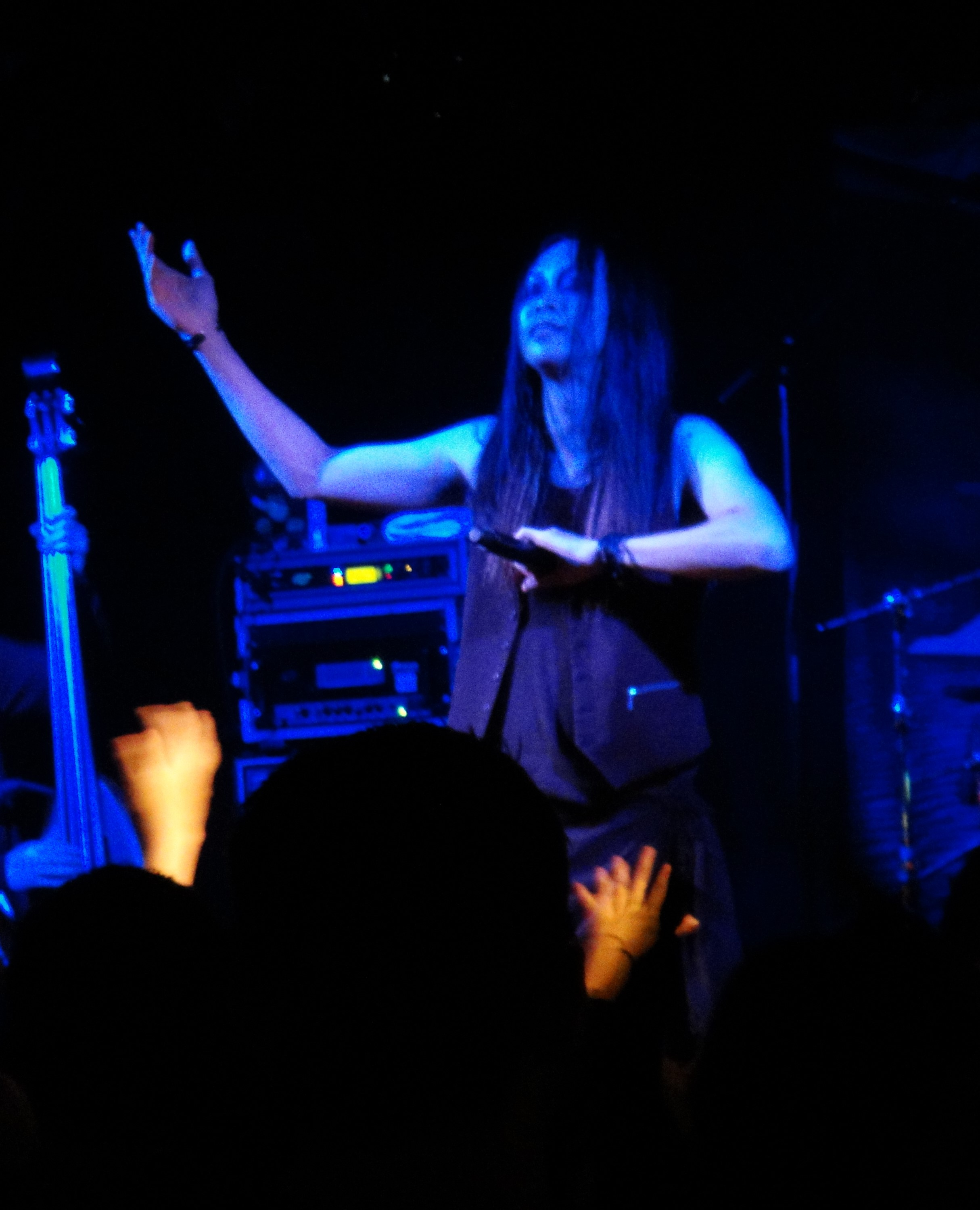
- Tatsuro on stage in Malmö, 2009

Background information
- Also known as: Tattoo
- Born: August 21, 1979 (age 47); Mito, Ibaraki, Japan
- Genres: Rock; heavy metal
- Occupations: Singer; songwriter
- Instruments: Vocals; harmonica
- Years active: 1997–present
- Label: Maverick
- Member of: Mucc
- Website: www.tatsuro-soloworks.jp

Tatsuro (Japanese: 逹瑯, Hepburn: Tatsurō; born August 21, 1979) is a Japanese singer and songwriter. He is best known as lead vocalist of the visual kei rock band Mucc since 1997. Tatsuro began a solo career in December 2021 and simultaneously released the albums = (Equal) and Hikagaku Hoteishiki the following year. Both reached the top 35 on the Oricon chart. His third album, Colors (2024), became his highest-charting solo release to date when it reached number 29.

== Early life ==
Tatsuro was born in Mito, Ibaraki on August 21, 1979, as the youngest of three kids. His family home doubled as a hair salon, and each of his family members is a hairdresser. One of his older brothers owns a salon named Magnolia in Aoyama, Tokyo. As a child, Tatsuro was really passionate about drawing and would draw on his elementary school notebooks everyday during class. Although he lost this passion as an adult, the singer said he always draws when recording an album. In 2022, he described his art style as simple, raw, and monochrome. He said he is bad at coloring and wants to keep people's attention on the lines, like manga artists.

Tatsuro said his interest in music started in fifth grade when he became a fan of Tsuyoshi Nagabuchi and The Blue Hearts due to the influence of his older brother. He then moved on to Luna Sea and L'Arc-en-Ciel, and eventually to Buck-Tick when he wanted something more underground. The first CDs he ever owned were "Linda Linda" by The Blue Hearts and Hide Your Face by Hide. Tatsuro said he started a band at 17 because he wanted to be popular at school festivals. He decided to shave his head at the time because he wanted to stand out from other visual kei acts. Tatsuro was a roadie for fellow Ibaraki Prefecture natives Cali Gari.

== Career ==
In high school, Tatsuro (then known as "Tattoo") formed Mucc in 1997 with guitarist Miya, drummer Satochi, and bassist Hiro, whom he had been friends with since primary school. While the other three members moved to Tokyo after graduating high school, Tatsuro began attending a two-year vocational school to become a hairdresser. Twice a week, he would commute to Tokyo, rehearse with Mucc in the middle of the night, and then take the train back to Ibaraki at around 5 am, until he quit school halfway through the program. In 1999, Hiro left the band and was replaced on bass by Miya's childhood friend Yukke on February 22. Antique, their debut EP, was released in 1999 by Misshitsu Neurose, an independent record label formed by Cali Gari guitarist Ao Sakurai. On June 8, 2000, Tatsuro adopted his current stage name. Mucc later signed to Danger Crue Records and established their own sublabel, Shu, for the 2002 release of their second album Hōmura Uta. However, the band made their major label debut on Universal with Zekū the following year. In 2009, they returned to being an indie band on Danger Crue, before signing to Sony for 2012's Shangri-La. In August 2012, the video game Mucc o Tobasu Yatsu (MUCCを飛ばすやつ) was released on the App Store. The band members took part it its creation, with Tatsuro drawing the characters. With the end of 2017, Mucc returned to being an independent band on Danger Crue yet again.

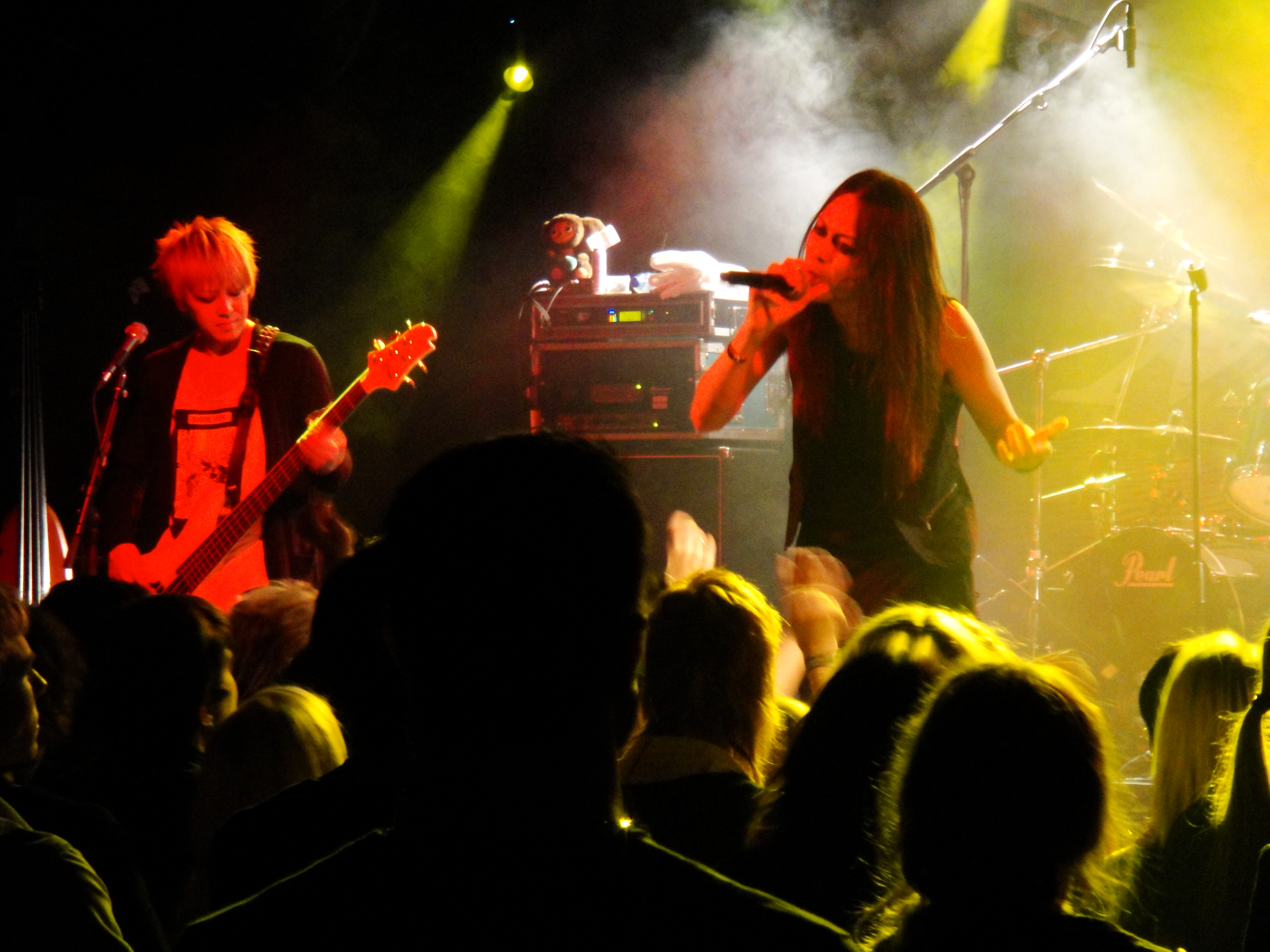
Tatsuro (right) performing with Mucc in Malmö, 2009

In 2009, Tatsuro formed the visual kei supergroup Karasu (カラス) with Hiroto (Alice Nine), Mizuki (Sadie), Dunch (Jealkb) and Kenzo (Ayabie). They performed at the Jack in the Box 2009 Summer event at Makuhari Messe on August 15. After releasing their first single "Lastica" on January 27, 2010, the band performed at the 2010 edition of the same festival on August 21. Second single "Free" was released on October 27 and used as the opening theme song of the Battle Spirits: Brave anime. Tatsuro wrote and composed "Koigokoro" for Jealkb's 2011 album Invade, and also sings on the recording. When former Kagerou vocalist Daisuke died, Tatsuro was recruited by his solo project, Daisuke to Kuro no Injatachi, to sing "Dokusai-sha no Namida" for their only album. In 2012, he was one of many artists featured on the song "Halloween Party", which was credited to the supergroup Halloween Junky Orchestra. The members of Karasu performed together at the Tokyo Chaos 2015 event at Yoyogi National Gymnasium's 2nd Gymnasium on December 31, 2015. The following year, Tatsuro, Hiroto and Kenzo were joined by Kei (Baroque) and Aki (Sid) to perform as "Karasu Re-born" (カラス Re-born) at Ken's Party Zoo ~Ken Entwines Naughty Stars~ event at the Dojima River Forum on September 25, 2016.

Tatsuro announced he was starting a solo career in December 2021. With time off due to the COVID-19 pandemic in Japan and with Satochi leaving Mucc, he said the timing of various things just worked out. An article on his website elaborated stating, that with Mucc losing a member, "more individuality and assertiveness from each member will now be required. Therefore, through his solo activities, Tatsuro wants to become a stronger individual as a member of Mucc." Tatsuro entrusted former Fujifabric drummer Fusafumi Adachi, whom he has known for over a decade, with all aspects of production, management, and budget management for his solo activities. His first solo performance was part of the Jack in the Box 2021 event at the Nippon Budokan on December 27, 2021. His first solo tour, titled Hajimemashite Tatsuro Desu. (はじめまして逹瑯です。; lit. "Nice to meet you, I'm Tatsuro"), was scheduled to be held at five venues between January 15 to February 4, 2022, with two performances a day for a total of 10 concerts. His backing band consisted of Adachi on keyboards, Dezert drummer Sora, Nocturnal Bloodlust bassist Masa, and guitarists Umi (Vistlip) and Nao (Arlequin). However, two of the dates were rescheduled to April 11 and 19, where R-Shitei drummer Hirotaka replaced Sora. In-between, Tatsuro played two acoustic concerts on April 12 and 20 where he was backed only by Adachi and violinist Hiromi Gotoh.

Tatsuro released his first two solo albums simultaneously on February 2, 2022. The songs on = (Equal) were written by Tatsuro and composed by him and Adachi with Sora, Ellegarden guitarist Shinichi Ubukata, and Merry vocalist Gara appearing as guest musicians. The music to the songs on Hikagaku Hoteishiki was written by Tatsuro's friends and he commented that it was entirely up to them, "I couldn't say no no matter what kind of song it was because I asked for it (laughs)". The songwriters include Ken (L'Arc-en-Ciel), Shuuji Ishii (Cali Gari), Eijun Suganami (The Back Horn), and Take (Flow). Ken's contribution, "The Love Letter", is a rock opera-style song and features Yukke and Duran. Tatsuro drew the covers to both albums after listening to their songs over and over again. Unconcerned with the technical aspects of drawing, he said he tried to translate the songs and express his emotions in the artwork.

Tatsuro wrote and composed the song "Rhapsodia" for the band Fantôme Iris from the From Argonavis multimedia project. He did so at the request of Arthur Lounsbery, voice actor of the band's vocalist. Nano Kitaoka, music producer for the franchise, called the track "a fusion of old-fashioned visual kei and modern goodness". Tatsuro's first solo single, "Endroll" released on September 21, 2022, includes a self-cover of "Rhapsodia". He then held the three-date Imagination from the Other Side tour that month, which he held in collaboration with a different act each night; Shō Kiryūin, Luz, and Aki.

The singer celebrated the first anniversary of his solo career with a concert titled Kitchen Guys 1st Kitchen Party at Club Citta on January 8, 2023. The backing band consisted of Adachi, Gotoh, Hirotaka, Metronome bassist Riu, and guitarists Yuu (Merry) and Lin (Unite). "Zankoku", his second single, was released on March 15 and includes a self-cover of "Koigokoro". In November, Tatsuro wrote another song for the From Argonavis multimedia project, "Brilliant Days". His third single, "Sora no Katachi", followed on December 6 and includes a self-cover of "Lastica". The title track was produced by former Wands keyboardist Kousuke Oshima, while the cover song was produced by Nao. Tatsuro released the acoustic cover album Pandora Juke Vox on March 13, 2024. Featuring covers of songs by artists such as RC Succession, Glay and Kuroyume, it was sold only at concerts or via mail order. The singer released his third studio album, Colors, on April 3. On March 29, he began separate tours for the two albums that were held concurrently. The one for Pandora Juke Vox was acoustic only, while the Colors tour featured a full rock band. On September 28 and 29, Tatsuro held the Arimatsu Ryu-Tatsuro (有村竜逹瑯) concert at Tokyo Kinema Club with Plastic Tree vocalist Ryutaro Arimura.

Tatsuro released the mini-album Monochrome on January 15, 2025. It was supported by the four-date Dead Rainbow tour that same month, and an acoustic version of the Arimatsu Ryu-Tatsuro event followed on February 4 and 6. Tatsuro released his first extended play, Kidoairaku, on September 9, 2026, and supported it with the Maningen (真人間) tour. He will hold four more Arimatsu Ryu-Tatsuro concerts with Arimura in October; two at the Tokyo Kinema Club in Tokyo, and two at Fushimi Jammin' in Aichi.

== Musical style ==
Although Mucc is known for switching between music genres and styles frequently, Tatsuro said they always try to keep their musical identity intact. "Even though our music has evolved, our foundation, our basis, has remained the same," but at the same time clarified that "Nobody in the band has ever forced himself to create music that doesn't match his personality." Tatsuro is one of the principal lyricists in Mucc and writes the lyrics after the music is composed. He does so by listening to the track, "Music is a great source of emotions. Whatever the emotion, I try to put words on it, describe it, lay it down on paper." The singer has also said that he is inspired by everyday things; "what I see, what I feel and things like that." In Mucc, he related how the band usually does not know who will write the lyrics even after the recording sessions have begun; "I keep some ideas in my head in case they come to me and ask me to write the lyrics. [...] But if they say they're going to write it, then that's fine." Tatsuro never imposes a theme or subject on himself when writing music, but does think about how it would sound live. When he writes English lyrics, he first writes them in Japanese and has them translated. He has, however, expressed an aversion to English lyrics. One reason being that he prefers the ambiguity of the Japanese language.

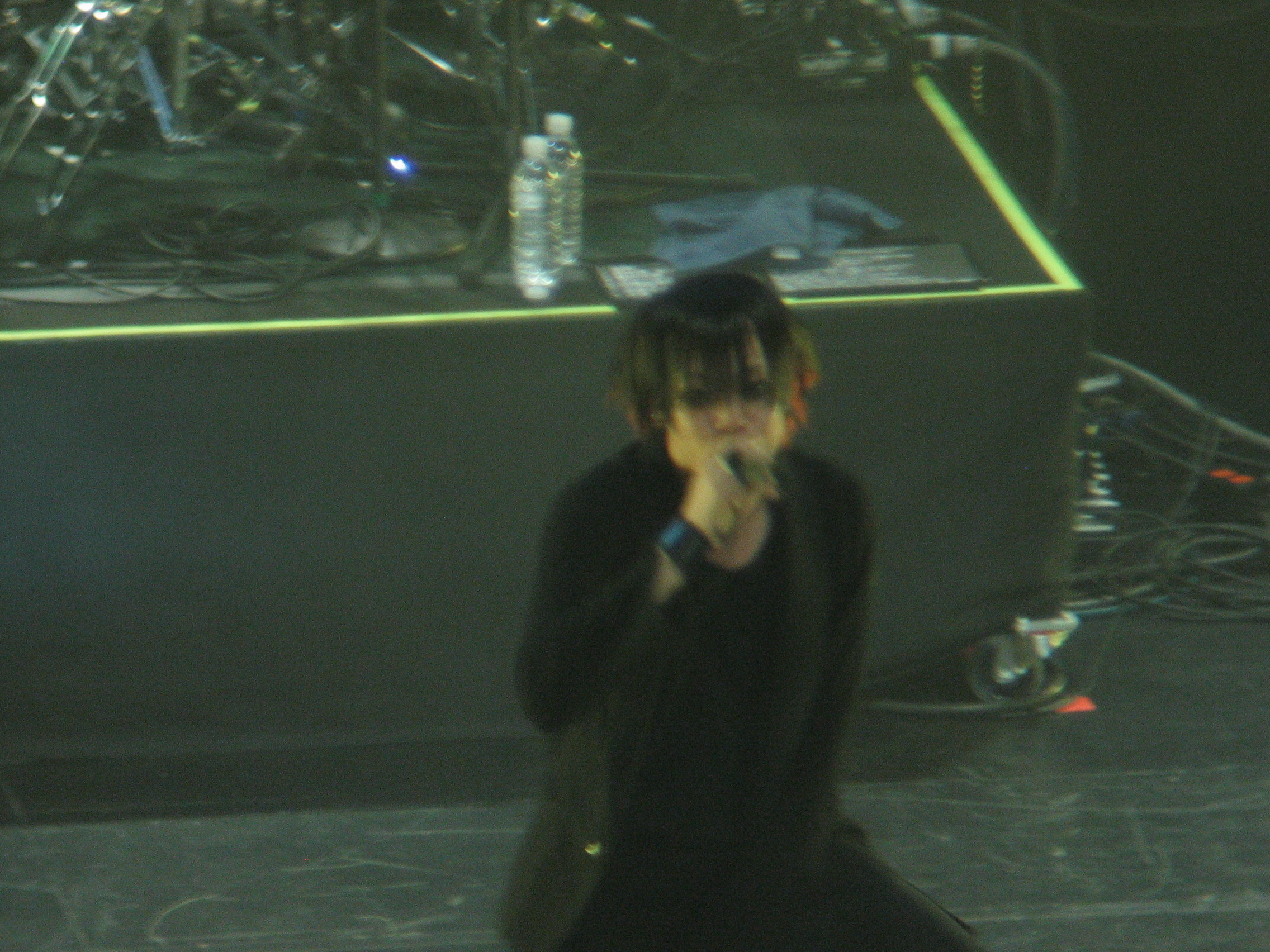
Tatsuro performing in Los Angeles, 2007

Tatsuro described his voice as "atypical", which makes it stand out and easy to recognize. Although he has taken vocal lessons in the past, he stopped as he did not understand the "abstract" things the instructor would say. "The best teacher I have now is my experience in the field. With trials and errors I have come to understand the fundamentals of singing such as breathing, posture, placement of voice, endurance and so on." When an interviewer suggested a singer must be thinking about the lyrics while performing, Tatsuro dismissed the notion and stated that singing was like riding a bicycle. He also said that he prefers to sing, and does not like screaming because it is tiring. Like the other members of Mucc, Tatsuro often performs barefoot. He said he got the idea after seeing Cocco's April 20, 2001 performance on Music Station, where the barefooted singer abruptly left the studio after finishing her song. He further explained that this was in Mucc's indie days when they had no money; whenever they were putting together new costumes, the shoes were typically the most expensive part, but as a visual kei band they could not simply wear sneakers. Nightmare vocalist Yomi said that he performed barefoot when he was an indie artist due to Tatsuro's influence.

When he started his solo career, the only thing Tatsuro had in mind was to create something different from what he had done with Mucc, "Creating different music with different musicians who have different personalities was the main goal." He described the material on = (Equal) as J-pop. When asked if his music had gotten softer as he has gotten older, the singer agreed, "I may have become a softer man anyway (smiles). If I had the opportunity to work on a solo album in my younger years, it would have had heavier songs." For Hikagaku Hoteishiki, the singer asked artists that he had always wanted to collaborate with and whom he respects to write songs for him, "I asked them to write songs that would fit me, that would fit the image I reflect, that would fit my vocal abilities, that they would like to hear me sing. I didn't change any part of any songs." He left it up to the composers whether they wanted him to write the lyrics or not, some did and some did not. Although = (Equal) also features some guest musicians, for that album Tatsuro determined himself how the songs would sound before selecting people accordingly. In 2022, Tatsuro said his solo work had an influence on Mucc, specifically mentioning how the band went on to include rap music on their subsequent album. In an interview about his third solo album Colors, Tatsuro revealed that when he decided to write songs with a "band sound", the resulting music was a "bit intense" and naturally brought out dark lyrics, like Mucc. He remarked that he has come to accept this as being imprinted in his DNA since Mucc is the only band he knows, and decided not to fight it. He later stated that the variety of songs on Colors and Monochrome was intentional so that he would have different types of songs to choose from when making the setlists for his concerts.

Tatsuro said his first musical idols were Tsuyoshi Nagabuchi and Hiroto Kōmoto. He cited Buck-Tick frontman Atsushi Sakurai as the vocalist who has influenced him the most, including his lyrics and stage presence, but is also very fond of The Yellow Monkey's Kazuya Yoshii. He is a fan of Luna Sea, whose songs he used to cover, and stated his belief that there is no musician of his generation who was not influenced by them. Tatsuro named Sophia and Hide as influences on his stage productions, specifically citing an early 1997 concert by the former that was the first professional concert he ever paid to attend.

== Discography ==
=== Studio albums ===
Title	Album details	Peak chart positions		
Title	Album details	JPN Oricon	JPN Billboard Hot	JPN Billboard Top
= (Equal)	Released: February 2, 2022; Label: Maverick	34	60	40
Hikagaku Hoteishiki (非科学方程式)	Released: February 2, 2022; Label: Maverick	33	62	39
Colors	Released: April 3, 2024; Label: Danger Crue	29	33	22

=== Mini-albums and extended plays ===
Title	Mini-album details	Peak chart positions		
Title	Mini-album details	JPN Oricon	JPN Billboard Hot	JPN Billboard Top
Monochrome	Released: January 8, 2025; Label: Danger Crue	44	—	39
Kidoairaku (奇怒哀落)	Released: September 9, 2026; Label: Danger Crue	—	—	55
"—" denotes a recording that did not chart.

=== Singles ===
Title	Single details	Peak chart positions		
Title	Single details	JPN Oricon	JPN Billboard Hot 100	JPN Billboard Top
"Endroll" (エンドロール)	Released: September 21, 2022; Label: Maverick	36	—	51
"Zankoku" (残刻)	Released: March 15, 2023; Label: Maverick	—	—	38
"Sora no Katachi" (ソラノカタチ)	Released: December 6, 2023; Label: Danger Crue	44	—	44
"Ao no Setsuna" (青の刹那)	Released: September 28, 2024; Label: Danger Crue; Note: Sold on tour or through Tatsuro's online store	—	—	—
"Villains"	Released: September 10, 2025; Label: Danger Crue; Note: Digital-only	—	—	—
"Checkmate"	Released: March 11, 2026; Label: Danger Crue; Note: Digital-only	—	—	—
"—" denotes a recording that did not chart.

=== Cover albums ===
Title	Album details	Peak chart positions		
Title	Album details	JPN Oricon	JPN Billboard Hot	JPN Billboard Top
Pandora Juke Vox	Released: March 13, 2024; Label: Danger Crue; Note: Sold on tour or by mail order	—	—	—
"—" denotes a recording that did not chart.

=== Video albums ===
Title	Video details	Peak chart positions
Title	Video details	JPN Oricon Blu-ray
Hajimemashite Tatsuro Desu. Live in KT Zepp Yokohama はじめまして逹瑯です。LIVE in KT Zepp Yokohama	Released: September 21, 2022	—
Kitchen Guys 1st Kitchen Party	Released: June 21, 2023	—
"—" denotes a recording that did not chart.

=== With Karasu ===
Title	Single details	Peak chart positions		
Title	Single details	JPN Oricon	JPN Billboard Hot 100	JPN Billboard Top
"Lastica"	Released: January 27, 2010; Label: Danger Crue	16	83	17
"Free"	Released: October 27, 2010; Label: Danger Crue	29	—	30
"—" denotes a recording that did not chart.

=== Other work ===
Work	Artist	Year	Role	Ref.
Invade	Jealkb	2011	Wrote, composed and sings on "Koigokoro" (恋心)	
Shikkoku no Hikari	Daisuke to Kuro no Injatachi	2011	Sings on "Dokusai-sha no Namida"	
"Halloween Party"	Halloween Junky Orchestra	2012	Sings on the song	
Miroir	Fantôme Iris	2022	Wrote, co-composed and co-arranged "Rhapsodia" (ラプソディア)	
"Brilliant Days"	Fantôme Iris	2023	Wrote, co-composed and co-arranged the song	
Sidekick	Straystride	2025	Wrote, co-composed and co-arranged "Zesshou Frontier" (絶唱フロンティア)	
Entr’acte (アントラクト)	From Argonavis	2026	Wrote, co-composed and co-arranged Straystride's "Burning"	
