= Fukurou =

Fukurou (梟, fukurō) is the Japanese name for the Ural owl.

It can also refer to:

- Fukurou, a character in the manga Damekko Dōbutsu
- Fukurou, a character from the anime and manga One Piece
- Fukurou, a character in the manga Usogui
- Fukurou, alias used by the character Eren Kruger from the anime and manga Attack on Titan
- Fukurou Nezire, a character in the Super Sentai series Denji Sentai Megaranger
- Fukurou Tsurubami, a character in the manga Medaka Box
- Fukurou, a song by Plastic Tree on their album Dona Dona
