= Utsusemi (album) =

Studio album by Plastic Tree
- Released: September 24, 2008
- Genre: Alternative rock
- Length: 65:08
- Label: Universal Music

Plastic Tree chronology
Nega to Poji (2007)	Utsusemi (2008)	ゲシュタルト崩壊 (Gestalt Houkai) (2009)

ウツセミ (Utsusemi) is the eighth full-length album by the Japanese rock group Plastic Tree. The limited edition album was sold with two bonus tracks and a poster.

== Track listing ==
No.	Title	Length
1.	"〜規則的な四拍子〜 Kisokuteki na Yonbyoshi"	0:15
2.	"うつせみ Utsusemi"	5:27
3.	"テトリス Tetris"	4:36
4.	"リプレイ(ウツセミ版) Replay (Utsusemi Ver.)"	5:16
5.	"メルト Melt"	4:34
6.	"Dummy Box"	4:46
7.	"Q"	3:16
8.	"フィクション Fiction"	6:02
9.	"斜陽 Shayou"	3:54
10.	"GEKKO OVERHEAD"	4:18
11.	"バルーン Balloon"	5:30
12.	"〜晴天、喚声、回転木馬の前〜 Seiten, Kansei, Kaiten Mokuba no Mae"	0:24
13.	"アローンアゲイン、ワンダフルワールド(ウツセミ版) Alone Again, Wonderful World (Utsusemi Ver.)"	5:15
14.	"記憶行き Kioku Yuki"	6:11
15.	"〜三角形の構図〜 Sankakukei no Kozu"	1:14
16.	"Closer"	4:10
