= List of Medaka Box episodes =

Medaka Box is an anime series adapted from the manga of the same title by Nisio Isin and Akira Akatsuki. The series follows Medaka Kurokami, Zenkichi Hitoyoshi, Kouki Akune and Mogana Kikaijima, who are the members of the student council, during their various adventures to honor suggestions presented by academy members in order to better the academy. Produced by Gainax and directed by Shouji Saeki, the anime series premiered on TV Tokyo on April 5, 2012, and ran for 12 episodes. The anime has been licensed in North America by Sentai Filmworks, who will release the anime in both digital and home video formats. The opening theme is "Happy Crazy Box", performed by Minami Kuribayashi. The ending theme is "Ohanabatake ni Tsuretette" (お花畑に連れてって), performed by Medaka's voice actress Aki Toyosaki. A second season, titled Medaka Box Abnormal (めだかボックス アブノーマル, Medaka Bokkusu Abunōmaru), aired from October 11 to December 27, 2012. The opening theme, "Believe", is once again performed by Minami Kuribayashi for the first 11 episodes and "Want to be winner!" is performed by Megumi Ogata for the final episode. The ending theme for the first 11 episodes is "Shugoshin Paradox" (守護心PARADOX) by Aki Misato.

== Episodes ==
=== Medaka Box ===
| No. | Title | Original air date |
|---|---|---|
| 1 | "Student Council in the House!"; Transliteration: "Seito-kai o Shikkō suru!" (Japanese: 生徒会を執行する！) | April 5, 2012 |
Zenkichi Hitoyoshi is reluctantly recruited by his childhood friend Medaka Kurokami to join the student council. Despite his reluctance, he is dragged along as Medaka responds to the first request in her suggestion box, requesting to get rid of the delinquents who have made their base in the kendo clubroom. Zenkichi observes as Medaka disciplines the delinquents to become better club members, but he develops feelings of envy for her excellence at everything since childhood. Habataki Hyūga, a student who despises the student council, tries to take down the delinquents for siding with Medaka. However, Zenkichi punches Hyūga in the face in response. Medaka later receives an anonymous note in the suggestion box, which requests her to teach Hyūga a very valuable lesson behind the true meaning of kendo. After Medaka expresses how important Zenkichi has been in her life, he agrees to be an official member of the student council.
| 2 | "Are You the Culprit? / Of Course it's Me!"; Transliteration: "Kisama ga Han'nin ka? / Tōzen, Watashi da!" (Japanese: 貴様が犯人か？ / 当然、私だ！) | April 12, 2012 |
Zenkichi, now the general clerk of the student council, is responsible for checking the suggestion box daily. Aria Ariake, a track team member who was blackmailed into quitting the track team, requests their help. As the two examine the evidence, it is deduced that the culprit used left-handed scissors to destroy Ariake's track and field shoes and cut out squares from a specific subscribed newspaper to write the threatening letter. As Hansode Shiranui points out that Isagi Isahaya may be the culprit, Medaka chases Isahaya until catching up to her. Although Isahaya lies about not being the culprit, Medaka lets her go without a single doubt. Ariake later has her track and field shoes replaced by an anonymous person, perhaps Isahaya. Later, Medaka tasks Zenkichi to find a dog for Urushi Akizuki. When Shiranui finds the dog, it turns out to be more feral rather than domestic. Since Zenkichi is unable to lure and catch the dog, Medaka dresses up as a dog to somehow get the job done right and complete the request.
| 3 | "None of Your Business!! / As You Wish, Medaka!!"; Transliteration: "Yokei na Mane da yo!! / Medaka-san no Mikokoro no Mama ni!!" (Japanese: 余計な真似だよ!! / めだかさんの御心のままにっ!!) | April 19, 2012 |
Zenkichi visits various clubs of the school, which builds up the reputation of being a "club crasher". An upperclassman named Hisshuu Kanoya, who plans to enact revenge on Medaka for winning against him in the student council election, tries to recruit Zenkichi in his cause to form a rally against Medaka. However, Zenkichi rejects the offer and stands firm as a member of the student council. Nekomi Nabeshima, captain of the judo club, requests Medaka to find a suitable successor among the members. Kouki Akune, nicknamed the "prince of judo", is revealed to be very much in love with Medaka. After it is shown that Zenkichi and Akune have been longtime rivals since childhood, Nabeshima challenges them to have a judo match, in which the loser will join the winner's club.
| 4 | "Make Your Choice!! / If You're Going To Make A Wish..."; Transliteration: "Dotchi yanen!! / Negai ga Aru nara" (Japanese: どっちやねん!! / 願いがあるなら) | April 26, 2012 |
The rule of the judo match is that Zenkichi must score one point before Akune scores ten points. Nabeshima wagers with Medaka, offering Akune to join the student council in exchange for Zenkichi to join the judo club. In response, Medaka cheers for Zenkichi, allowing him to win the match. As Betsuhei Jounan has taken over as the new captain of the judo club, Nabeshima relieves Akune from the judo club so he could chase his dream to win Medaka's heart. Zenkichi is distraught upon learning that Akune is now the secretary of the student council. Medaka tasks Akune to help Kenna Yatsushiro, a tomboy with bad handwriting, to convey her feelings for a crush in a love letter. When Akune gives Medaka a rough draft of the love letter, Medaka comments that Akune was only using his own words rather than considering Yatsushiro's feelings in the matter. With that in mind, Akune decides to tutor Yatsushiro in handwriting skills, and after a week of practice, Yatsushiro finally gives the love letter to her crush. Medaka takes back what she said earlier and thanks Akune for his hard work.
| 5 | "Win Your Earnings!"; Transliteration: "Katte Eyo!" (Japanese: 勝って得よ！) | May 3, 2012 |
Since the suggestion box has accumulated numerous requests concerning budget increases among different club, the student council struggles to find a solution to distribute club funds fairly. However, thanks to a request to use the indoor swimming pool for a competition, the student council decides to host an inter-club aquatic meet with the funds going to the winning club. This will be an underwater contest made up of four events, in which only three team members per club will be allowed to participate, and all male members will be handicapped with inflatable armbands. In an effort to make the competition more interesting, Medaka offers to triple the budget of any club that performs better than the student council. Tanzaku Aso, the president of the broadcast club, acts as a commentator alongside Shiranui. The first event is underwater basketball, where the contestants have to dive into the swimming pool to retrieve heavy basketballs and throw them into their assigned baskets. Medaka clusters twenty balls together and shoots them in the basket, which then most of the other clubs do the same, including the swim team.
| 6 | "I Don't Expect You to Understand"; Transliteration: "Wakatte moraō nante Omottenai yo" (Japanese: わかってもらおーなんて思ってないよ) | May 10, 2012 |
The second event is the underwater three-legged race. Zenkichi and Akune race each other and end up in third, Ariake and Isahaya place in second, while Umumichi Yakushima and Sotsu Tanegashima easily finish in first. The third event is the underwater eel catching. Nabeshima catches nine eels but still is in ninth overall, Mogana Kikaijima catches thirteen eels and lands in first overall, while Medaka was unable to catch any eels and is brought down in eighth overall. After hearing the swim team declare that they would die for money, Medaka makes it her mission to rehabilitate them. The final event, chosen by Shiranui and Aso, is the underwater chicken fight. During the battle, Kikaijima expresses desperation for money due to childhood struggles. Zenkichi and Akune toss their inflatable armbands out when Kikaijima pushes Medaka into the air. This allows Medaka to safely land above water, and she tackles Kikaijima with a kiss, thereby winning the match. However, the judo club wins the inter-club aquatic meet by a landslide, since they managed to grab the bandanas from the other teams while Medaka and Kikaijima were distracted by their match. Kikaijima is then appointed as the treasurer of the student council.
| 7 | "Does She Do This to Everyone? / My Own Tune!!"; Transliteration: "Dare ni demo Kōiu Koto Suru no? / Katte de Nakereba!!" (Japanese: 誰にでもこういうことするの？/勝手でなければ！！) | May 17, 2012 |
After an awkward moment between Zenkichi and Kikaijima, they struggle to become friends with each other. To break the ice, Shiranui visits them and embarrasses Kikaijima with a photo of Medaka kissing her while being tackled during the underwater chicken fight. Zenkichi explains to Kikaijima that Medaka naturally shows display of affection to anyone, seeing them as part of her family, in a manner of speaking. Kikaijima interprets this the wrong way and tries to kiss Zenkichi, but Medaka and Akune walk in on them. Kizashi Yuubaru, affiliated with the art club, wants Medaka to model for a new masterpiece that he is drawing. After Yuubaru fails to capture the true beauty of Medaka on canvas, Zenkichi and Akune respectively convince Isahaya and Nabeshima to be models, but Yuubaru turns them both down. Yuubaru considers Kikaijima at first, but he changes his mind. Not even Zenkichi and Akune are suitable models for Yuubaru in the end. When Yuubaru catches sight of Shiranui, he is able to capture her true beauty in his drawing to sell as cafeteria vouchers. To commemorate his success, Yuubaru gives the student council a drawing of the seven of them in return.
| 8 | "I Will Crush Kurokami Medaka!!"; Transliteration: "Kurokami Medaka wa Watashi ga Tsubushimasu!!" (Japanese: 黒神めだかは私が潰します！！) | May 24, 2012 |
Harigane Onigase, a member of the disciplinary committee, enters the student council office and exploits the student council members for their violations of the dress code. Onigase leaves in anger after Medaka chooses to ignore this. Although Zenkichi tries to persuade Onigase to let this go, Onigase uses the suggestion box to her advantage, anonymously requesting Medaka to find an object inside a dirty outdoor swimming pool, assuming she would change into a swimsuit. Instead, Medaka jumps into the swimming pool with her uniform on, which then Onigase is taken by surprise and also jumps into the swimming pool in guilt and shame. Later, Onigase accidentally handcuffs Zenkichi after scolding Shiranui for eating donuts in the hallway. As Zenkichi and Onigase head to the disciplinary committee office to get the key, they chance upon Medaka, who inadvertently handcuffs Zenkichi as well. After they help various students in need of assistance, they are ambushed by the Mokkin Team, a pair of delinquents who use their wooden and metal baseball bats to attack. Medaka and Zenkichi destroy the baseball bats with their kicks and cause the Mokkin Team to flee, giving Onigase a whole new insight on the student council.
| 9 | "It's Not Justice If You Don't Go Overboard!"; Transliteration: "Yarisugi nakerya Seigi janee!" (Japanese: やり過ぎなけりゃ正義じゃねえ！) | May 31, 2012 |
Medaka talks to Shiranui about some complaints which deals with soundproofing the music room for the school orchestra, while the other student council members are busy completing other requests. Medaka finds Shiranui suitable to be the vice president of the student council, even though they both hate each other in some way. While on the way to the music room with towels to deliver, Onigase passes by the two of them. Meanwhile, Myouri Unzen, the chairman of the disciplinary committee, voices his concerns to the school orchestra, but he is not taken quite seriously since he is very young. When Medaka, Shiranui and Onigase arrive, they find the music room demolished and the surviving students in tears. Myouri explains to the three that he maintains peace through use of violence to enforce the rules. Medaka takes two hits from Myouri, declaring that she has no reason to fight him. However, Myouri reveals that he sent Rankaku Yoshinogari, Kanraku Kunisaki and Fue Yobuko each after Kikaijima, Akune and Zenkichi, respectively. While Shiranui blocks the doorway to prevent Myouri from leaving, Medaka defeats each of the disciplinary committee members before the other student council members take notice of being targeted.
| 10 | "I Will Not Forgive You!!"; Transliteration: "Watashi wa Kisama o Yurusanai!!" (Japanese: 私は貴様を許さない！！) | June 7, 2012 |
Yobuko becomes speechless when Zenkichi states that Medaka was saving the disciplinary committee members from the student council members, not the other way around. Myouri, maddened that Medaka defeated all of the disciplinary committee members, plots his revenge. He enters the student council office and claims to be the mirror image of Medaka, but he hates humans and the way that they always break the rules. However, this was a trap for the student council members, as he activates explosives in the form of bouncy balls that he cleverly placed around the office during his talk. In the aftermath, Myouri is surprised that Medaka deflected some of the explosives, rolled up her friends in a rug and carried them outside to safety. Although Myouri believes that Medaka still has no reason to fight, Medaka instead goes into a fit of rage and gives Myouri a taste of his own medicine.
| 11 | "This Is The End!!"; Transliteration: "Kore de Kecchaku da!!" (Japanese: これで決着だ！！) | June 14, 2012 |
Since the tricks up his sleeves are rendered useless outdoors, Myouri is no match against Medaka. However, Myouri lures Medaka into the ruins of the school building. Using a barrage of bouncy balls as a distraction, he uses one which emits threads of invisible strings to immobilize her, yet she still breaks through the strings and traps him in the rubble. Myouri admits defeat and expresses his hate for humans, but he mentions that Medaka is not human at all, despite her claim that she loves humans. He tempts her to finish him off, but as she gives the finishing blow, Zenkichi, Akune and Kikaijima stand in her way. Seeing that she has friends who support her, this reverts her back to normal. Medaka invites Myouri to be the vice president of the student council, already knowing that he is the chairman of the disciplinary committee, though she was actually trying to befriend him. After the student council members leave, Onigase and Yobuko arrive to help Myouri, who pardons the student council members from their violations, but he shows concern for Medaka if she is aware of what would happen if he were to be removed.
| 12 | "Even Without Kurokami Medaka"; Transliteration: "Kurokami Medaka ga Inakutemo" (Japanese: 黒神めだかがいなくても) | June 21, 2012 |
With Medaka admitted to the hospital, Zenkichi, Akune and Kikaijima discuss about how Medaka influenced them in their lives. Sooner than later, Sasae Mochibaru, captain of the shogi club, requests the three to find a missing king shogi piece hidden somewhere in the messy shogi clubroom. When Mochibaru returns after the shogi clubroom is cleaned, it is realized that all sets of shogi pieces are missing the king shogi piece. Miri Natayama, a skilled shogi player, is considered a suspect in this crime of burglary, possibly because she left the shogi club for not being chosen as the captain of the shogi club, since she treated the beginners with disrespect. Zenkichi challenges Natayama to a game of shogi with only the gold generals, showing her that only a variation of shogi can be played without the king shogi piece. Akune explains that the king, also called the jade general, continues to fight in life's tough circumstances instead of running away. Natayama is content knowing that the student council still functions well even without Medaka being there to support. The missing king shogi pieces are later found inside one of the lockers in the shogi clubroom, perhaps by Natayama.

=== Medaka Box Abnormal ===
| No. overall | No. in season | Title | Original air date |
|---|---|---|---|
| 1 | 13 | "Normal, Special, and Abnormal"; Transliteration: "Nōmaru to, Supesharu to, Abunōmaru" (Japanese: ノーマルと、スペシャルと、アブノーマル) | October 11, 2012 |
Medaka Kurokami is requested by academy chairman Hakama Shiranui to participate in the Flask Plan, a project to turn ordinary humans into Abnormals, in place of Myouri Unzen in Class 13, but she turns down the offer and leaves, despite her being able to stack six dice together when she rolled them. Little does she know, the Front Six were in the office surrounding her the entire time without being seen. Medaka is then attacked by Myouga Unzen, who communicates using a string of numbers, vying for the vacant spot in the Flask Plan by defeating her. Medaka fails to dodge the attacks, that is until Nekomi Nabeshima shows up to defend her. However, Myouga takes off the weight of her iron balls and strikes Nabeshima from behind, yet Nabeshima uses the same mentality and slams Myouga's head onto the ground. Afterwards, Nabeshima tells Medaka that abstinence from fighting may lead to more violence. Medaka leaves after thanking Nabeshima for the advice. As Medaka visits Hakama again, Zenkichi Hitoyoshi and Hansode Shiranui are approached by Oudo Miyakonojou, who is looking for Medaka.
| 2 | 14 | "Sister, Sister, Sister!"; Transliteration: "Imōto, Imōto, Imōto da!" (Japanese: 妹・妹・妹だ！) | October 18, 2012 |
Shiranui bails out on Zenkichi, who is forced to bow down to Oudo. Mizou Yukuhashi spots Medaka, who is also subdued by Oudo. When Oudo proposes to Medaka, Zenkichi tries to attack, but Yukuhashi intervenes. After Oudo requests Medaka to meet him atop the clock tower at five o'clock the next morning, Zenkichi soon notices that Medaka may have developed feelings for Oudo. However, since Oudo is posed as a new threat, Medaka wants to become stronger. Medaka and Zenkichi go to an old administration building to visit her older brother Maguro Kurokami, who seems to be obsessed with her. After Medaka demands Maguro to train her and tell her about the Flask Plan, he shows them his surgical scars of being a failed experiment in the Flask Plan, but he does not give any information regarding this project. After Maguro sees how determined the two are in becoming stronger, he decides to train them both.
| 3 | 15 | "Crush You Today!"; Transliteration: "Kyōjū ni Tatakitsubusu!" (Japanese: 今日中に叩き潰す！) | October 25, 2012 |
After the training session, Medaka and Zenkichi meet Oudo atop the clock tower on time. Zenkichi kicks Oudo off of the clock tower, but the latter is able to grip against the side of the clock tower while still standing. Oudo explains that the Flask Plan is a project intended to involve all of the academy students, using a formulated potion which may grant superhuman abilities, but only a small percentage of academy students will be able to survive the experiment. Although Medaka vows to stop the Flask Plan from happening, the suggestion box is soon stuffed with requests related to Class 13 and the Flask Plan. At the underground laboratory beneath the clock tower, twin brothers Sanou Tsushima and Unou Tsushima, who guard the Door of Rejection, are amazed when Medaka and Mogana Kikaijima each enter the correct security code to pass through. However, since that security code is no longer valid, Kouki Akune smashes through the door, allowing him and Zenkichi to catch up with Medaka and Kikaijima. As they enter the first floor resembling a labyrinth, Shigusa Takachiho stands in their way, but this may be an opportunity for Medaka to test her newfound strength.
| 4 | 16 | "The Monster I've Sought"; Transliteration: "Ore wa Omae to Iu Bakemono to" (Japanese: 俺はお前という化物と) | November 1, 2012 |
As Medaka and Takachiho duel in a kickboxing match, she choose to take his hits in order to retrieve his flash drive containing data on the Flask Plan. However, he snatches back the flash drive from under her nose, claiming this to be his life's work, something that will not be easily obtained. Medaka throws a bunch of bouncy balls at Takachiho and determines that his movements are reflexive based on how he dodged the bouncy balls. However, as Takachiho breaks her arm after she attempted to attack him from multiple angles, she still manages to take back the flash drive in the process, by which he realizes that her movements are not reflexive at all. After Takachiho shows the real data on a bigger flash drive, Medaka attacks him at the speed of sound, overwhelming him but destroying the bigger flash drive. As both of their bodies are pushed to their limits, they have a final fistfight to the finish. Takachiho, satisfied with finding someone worthy of fighting him for the first time in his life, is ultimately defeated with a kick to the head by Medaka.
| 5 | 17 | "You Can't Be Killed!"; Transliteration: "Kimi no inochi wa korosenai" (Japanese: 君の命は殺せない) | November 8, 2012 |
On the second floor resembling a garden, the student council members encounter Kei Munakata, who believes that everything is a reason for him to kill. Maguro also comes by and reveals to be the one who taught Munakata how to fight using concealed weapons. Since Medaka is in no shape to fight, Zenkichi takes her place. Zenkichi deflects all the weapons Munakata throws at him, including swords, guns and even grenades. When Zenkichi lowers his guard down, Munakata stabs him in the back with many swords, which causes Medaka to break into tears. However, Zenkichi manages to survive, and with some words of encouragement from Medaka, Zenkichi traps Munakata by bringing down the swords previously kicked up into the ceiling, thereby winning the match. Afterwards, Munakata, who struggled to make friends all of his life, has now become friends with Zenkichi.
| 6 | 18 | "Please Become My Something"; Transliteration: "Ore no nanika ni natte kure" (Japanese: 俺の何かになってくれ) | November 15, 2012 |
On the third floor resembling a zoo, while Medaka and Kikaijima have their opposing views of the animals, Akune separates from the group and runs into Youka Naze, who advises him to leave the laboratory. Suddenly, Itami Koga sneaks up from behind and attempts to choke Akune. In the past, Akune was ordered by Misogi Kumagawa, the president of the student council during middle school, to physically abuse Medaka, but Medaka still attended school everyday regardless of all the beatings. Medaka stood up for herself and eventually made Akune have a change of heart. In the present, Akune tries to grapple Koga, but she recovers from the move due to the fact that she is an android. In the past, Koga lived a normal life until meeting Naze for the first time in middle school, since Naze was the most bullied student in the school. In the present, the fight continues on the fourth floor resembling Naze's workshop. After Akune cracks Koga's knee, Koga hurts Akune's shoulder soon after, since it takes only ten seconds for Koga to heal from a fracture. Maguro interrupts the match and harasses Naze, which irritates Koga.
| 7 | 19 | "Kurokami Kujira Is a Lovely Name"; Transliteration: "Kurokami kujira to iu sutekina namae" (Japanese: 黒神くじらという素敵な名前) | November 22, 2012 |
It is revealed that Naze is the successor of Maguro as the supervisor of the Flask Plan. Koga tries to grapple Akune, but he temporarily dislocates her arm in response. After Maguro vaguely hints to Akune about his options not being limited to destroying or not destroying, Akune pins and holds Koga to the ground to exhaust her, deducing that her weakness is fatigue. Maguro tells Naze to remove her bandages from her face, and after Naze surrenders her two flash drives containing data on the Flask Plan to retrieve Koga, Maguro recognizes Naze as Kujira Kurokami, his long-lost younger sister. In the past, Naze isolated herself in her room and only concentrated on her studies in biology, but she left the house on her eleventh birthday and was never heard of again ever since then. In the present, Maguro admits that he formerly joined the Flask Plan all to find Naze for six years, since he cares so much about her. When Maguro finally embraces Naze, she incapacitates him using a syringe. As Naze changes her mind about giving up her research, Medaka suddenly burst through the wall and reunites with her older sister.
| 8 | 20 | "I Don't Want to See You Cry"; Transliteration: "Naku tokoro nante mitakunai" (Japanese: 泣くところなんて見たくない) | November 29, 2012 |
Naze, who repressed her childhood memories and exhibited stoic behavior as a result, tries to attack Medaka with a green syringe, which contains a poisonous liquid. Medaka demands for the antidote but first injects herself with the green syringe, which only weakens her body. Naze then gives Medaka an orange syringe to inject, seemingly containing the antidote, but it suppresses her memories and purpose in life. Before Naze and Koga leave with an unconscious Medaka in tow, Naze tells Akune and Maguro that she plans to change Medaka's personality as her final experiment. Akune and Maguro meet up with Zenkichi and Kikaijima to inform them of the situation. Harigane Onigase, Myouri, Nabeshima, Myouga, Takachiho and Munakata, who make up the Loser Team, all arrive to offer a helping hand, but as they all head for the elevator to go to the thirteen floor, they are stopped by the Plus Six. The Loser Team faces against the Plus Six, while Zenkichi, Akune, Kikaijima and Maguro use the stairway down to the twelfth floor resembling an arcade. However, Yukuhashi stands in their way to prevent them from interfering with the experiment, which will be over in fifteen minutes.
| 9 | 21 | "Kurokami Medaka (Rev)"; Transliteration: "Kurokami Medaka (Kai) desu" (Japanese: 黒神めだか（改）です) | December 6, 2012 |
Yukuhashi fills the arcade with sleeping gas, and Kikaijima remains standing since she can hold her breath for long periods of time. Kikaijima attacks with her screams after being provoked by Yukuhashi, who has the ability to read people's minds. She tries to defend her friendship with Medaka, seeing her as normal rather than unusual. Kikaijima, after screaming directly at the ceiling to cut herself with shards of glass, realizes that Yukuhashi can be swayed by people's emotions. Oudo, arriving to inform that Medaka has been completely brainwashed from the experiment, subdues Kikaijima and attempts to crush her with arcade machines from above, but Zenkichi saves her at the last second. Akune fails to restrain Oudo, who then forces Zenkichi to choke Kikaijima. Maguro reveals that Oudo has the ability to control people's minds, which is the exact opposite of Yukuhashi's ability. Zenkichi breaks free from Oudo's control and voices his objections against changing Medaka's personality. However, Zenkichi struggles to argue against the fact that Medaka always displayed a self-righteous attitude and tended to reform people's minds. Medaka then appears in a straitjacket, telling everyone that she is not the same.
| 10 | 22 | "To Make Everyone Happy"; Transliteration: "Minna o Shiawase ni suru tame ni wa" (Japanese: みんなを幸せにするためには) | December 13, 2012 |
Medaka believes that she has come to her senses and must be a part of the Flask Plan to achieve perfection, much to the disagreement of Zenkichi, Akune and Kikaijima. After she subdues the three, Maguro notices from a distance that Medaka is shedding tears despite her being heartless. Zenkichi fights back with his kicks and tries to get Medaka to remember her true self. In the past, Medaka's mother died after giving birth to Medaka fifteen years ago. During her first two years of life, her ability to surpass the intelligence of adults at such a young age made her realize that life and death have no meaning. In the present, after recalling her first encounter with Zenkichi thirteen years ago telling her that she was born to make everyone happy, Medaka rips out of her straitjacket and punches Zenkichi, realizing that her new purpose in life is to protect herself. She strangles him until she realizes that he remembered what he told her back then, which causes her to yell in agony. Zenkichi embraces Medaka, telling her that she must include herself in her purpose to make everyone happy, which then reverts her back to normal.
| 11 | 23 | "That's All She Wrote!"; Transliteration: "Kore nite ikkenrakuchaku!" (Japanese: これにて一件落着！) | December 20, 2012 |
On the thirteenth floor resembling a computer room, Medaka declines Oudo's offer yet again to be a part of the Flask Plan. Koga, feeling insulted due to the fact that she was made into an android for this project, believes that Oudo is not strong enough to defeat Medaka, but Oudo reaches inside Koga to take her ability. Naze is left in tears after seeing Koga in critical condition, imploring Maguro to tend to Koga's wounds. During the match between Medaka and Oudo, the latter notices that the former has acquired abilities from her past opponents. However, Medaka is actually able to control and master these abilities at will without any problems. When Oudo tries to claim Medaka's power, he falls back after seeing the darkness which lurks inside of her. Medaka makes Oudo change his ways and apologize for his actions. When everyone ride on the elevator to the first floor, they are shocked when both the Loser Team and the Plus Six are wiped out by large screws, and the person behind this happens to be Kumagawa.
| 12 | 24 | "Medaka Box Extra Volume: Good Loser Kumagawa"; Transliteration: "Medaka Bokkusu Bangaihen: Guddo Rūzā Kumagawa" (Japanese: めだかボックス番外編:グッドルーザー球磨川) | December 27, 2012 |
Najimi Ajimu, founder of Hakoniwa Academy (or Sandbox Academy) and creator of the Flask Plan, introduces this episode as a direct sequel to the manga's side-chapter of the same name which follows Kumagawa, an extremely formidable Minus wreaking havoc with his large screws as the president of the student council at the prestigious Suisou Academy (or Fish Tank Academy). Saki Sukinasaki runs late for school and is reluctant to find out that her hair was bleached somehow. She informs Kumagawa of this and deduces that Fude Ezumachi, who has the ability to manipulate color with his art, is responsible for this. Kumagawa confronts Ezumachi, who eventually splashes blue paint on Kumagawa to restrict him. Later, as Kumagawa recovers from an epiphanic dream about Ajimu, he gains the resolve to defeat Ezumachi. As Kumagawa and Sukinasaki head to the football field, they discuss that Ezumachi was in love with Aki Jakago, the former president of the student council. Kumagawa confronts Ezumachi again, this time removing the twelve basic colors from existence, in which only white and black remain. Kumagawa pierces through Ezumachi with large screws, saying that life and death have no meaning, just like the colors white and black.
