= Puppet show (disambiguation) =

A puppet show is a form of theatre or performance which involves the manipulation of puppets.

Puppet show may also refer to:

- The Puppet-Show, a humorous and satirical magazine in Victorian England
- "The Puppet Show" (Buffy the Vampire Slayer), a Buffy the Vampire Slayer episode
- "The Puppet Show", List of compositions by Modest Mussorgsky
- Puppet Show (album), a 1998 Japanese rock album
- Puppet Show (film), a 1936 Universal cartoon
