= Chandelier (Plastic Tree album) =

Studio album by Plastic Tree
- Released: June 28, 2006
- Genre: Alternative rock
- Length: 62:48
- Label: Universal Music

Plastic Tree chronology
黒盤 [Kuro Ban] (2005)	Chandelier (2006)	「ネガとポジ」(Nega to Poji) (2007)

Singles from Chandelier
- 1. "Sanbika" Released: May 11, 2005; 2. "Namae no Nai Hana" Released: October 12, 2005; 3. "Ghost" Released: November 16, 2005; 4. "Kuuchuu Buranko" Released: December 14, 2005; 5. "Namida Drop" Released: May 10, 2006

Chandelier (シャンデリア) is the Japanese rock band Plastic Tree's sixth full-length album. Those who ordered the first press limited edition of this album also received a poster. Peaked at the 23rd position on Oricon Albums Chart.

== Track listing ==
No.	Title	Length
1.	"ヘイト・レッド、ディップ・イット Hate.Red, Dip.It"	4:32
2.	"内臓マイク Naizou Mike"	3:48
3.	"ナミダドロップ Namida Drop"	4:27
4.	"Ghost"	4:54
5.	"puppet talk"	5:09
6.	"名前のない花 Namae no Nai Hana"	5:05
7.	"37°C"	3:49
8.	"cage for rent"	5:13
9.	"讃美歌 Sanbika"	5:04
10.	"センチメントマシーン Sentimental Machine" (a.k.a. "Sentiment Machine")	4:01
11.	"空中ブランコ Kuuchuu Buranko"	5:23
12.	"ラストワルツ Last Waltz"	4:30
13.	"六月の雨 [Bonus Track] Rokugatsu No Ame (Amefure mix)"	6:34
