= Cell (album) =

Studio album by Plastic Tree
- Released: August 25, 2004
- Genre: Alternative rock
- Length: 57:03
- Label: Universal Music

Plastic Tree chronology
シロクロニクル (Shiro Chronicle) (2003)	Cell (2004)	白盤 [Shiro Ban] (2005)

Cell is the tenth album by the Japanese rock group Plastic Tree. It peaked at number 34 on Oricon Albums Chart.

== Track listing ==
No.	Title	Length
1.	"Cell"	4:25
2.	"Melancholic"	5:11
3.	"Harusaki Sentimental"	5:15
4.	"Dance Macabre"	4:21
5.	"Kaibutsu-kun"	4:59
6.	"Crackpot"	4:49
7.	"Yuki Hotaru"	4:29
8.	"Comic Youth"	4:27
9.	"Harienju"	6:28
10.	"Uwa no Sora"	5:27
11.	"Yume no Shima"	3:49
12.	"Hidden track"	3:18
