= Ammonite (album) =

Studio album by Plastic Tree
- Released: April 6, 2011
- Genre: Alternative Rock
- Length: 57:33
- Label: Japan Records

Plastic Tree chronology
ALL TIME THE BEST (2010)	Ammonite (2011)	Ink (2012)

Ammonite is the eleventh album by the Japanese rock group Plastic Tree.

== Track listing ==
No.	Title	Length
1.	"Thirteenth Friday"	6:45
2.	"Moonlight----. (ammonite version)"	4:45
3.	"退屈マシン Taikutsu Machine"	3:27
4.	"Mirai Iro (ammonite version)"	4:09
5.	"雪月花 Setsugetsuka"	4:02
6.	"アイラヴュー・ソー I love you so"	3:25
7.	"アリア Aria"	4:56
8.	"デュエット Duet"	5:06
9.	"Bambi (ammonite version)"	5:19
10.	"さびしんぼう Sabishinbou"	5:02
11.	"～ 作品「ammonite」～ ~Sakuhin ammonite~"	1:45
12.	"ブルーバック Blue Book"	5:38
13.	"Spooky"	3:07
