= B-Men Gahou =

Compilation album by Plastic Tree
- Released: September 5, 2007
- Genre: Rock

B-Men Gahou (B面画報, B men gahō) is a compilation album composed of B-sides released by the Japanese rock group Plastic Tree. It was released on September 5, 2007.

== Track listing ==
1. ベランダ. Veranda
2. lilac
3. 光合成 Kougousei
4. 水彩 Suisai
5. 存在理由 Sonzai riyuu
6. パラノイア Paranoia
7. 六月の雨 Rokugatsu no ame
8. 本日は晴天なり Honjitsu wa seiten nari
9. ジンテーゼ Synthesis
10. 冬の海は遊泳禁止で Fuyu no umi wa yuuei kinshi de
11. 月の光をたよりに Tsuki no hikari wo tayori ni
12. エンジェルダスト Angel dust
13. 白い足跡 Shiroi ashiato
14. ロム Romu
15. 藍より青く Ai yori aoku
