= Parade (Plastic Tree album) =

Studio album by Plastic Tree
- Released: August 23, 2000
- Genre: Alternative Rock
- Length: 53:54
- Label: Warner Music Japan

Plastic Tree chronology
Puppet Show (1998)	Parade (2000)	Träumerei (2002)

Parade is the third full-length album by the Japanese rock group Plastic Tree, released on August 23, 2000.

== Track listing ==
1. エーテル ETHER
2. ロケット ROCKET
3. スライド．(Ver.2.0) SLIDE
4. 少女狂騒 shoujo kyousou(Girl naive)
5. ベランダ．(Ver.1.0) VERANDA
6. 空白の日 kuuhaku no hi(The blank day)
7. 十字路 juujiro(Crossroad)
8. トレモロ(Ver.2.0) TREMOLO
9. 睡眠薬 suimin yaku(A sleeping pill)
10. bloom
11. Sink(Ver.2.0)
12. そしてパレードは続く soshite PARADE wa tsuzuku(And the parade continues)
