= Hide and Seek (Plastic Tree album) =

HIDE and SEEK

Studio album by Plastic Tree
- Released: July 10, 1997
- Genre: Alternative Rock; Shoegaze; Noise Rock; Garage Rock
- Label: EntrancE

Plastic Tree chronology
Strange Fruits -Kimyou na Kajitsu- (1995)	HIDE and SEEK (1997)	Puppet Show (1998)

HIDE and SEEK is the first full-length album by the Japanese rock group Plastic Tree released on July 10, 1997.

== Track listing ==
1. 痛い青 Itai Ao
2. エーテルノート Ether Note
3. 割れた窓 Wareta Mado
4. クローゼットチャイルド Closet Child
5. スノーフラワー Snow Flower
6. Hide and Seek #1
7. トランスオレンジ Trance Orange
8. 真昼の月 Mahiru no Tsuki
9. 水槽。 Suisou
10. ねじ巻きノイローゼ Nejimaki Neurose
11. Hide and Seek # 2
