= Dona Dona =

ドナドナ(Dona Dona)

Studio album by Plastic Tree
- Released: December 23, 2009
- Genre: Alternative rock
- Length: 48:26
- Label: Universal Music

Plastic Tree chronology
ゲシュタルト崩壊 (Gestalt Houkai) (2009)	ドナドナ(Dona Dona) (2009)	ALL TIME THE BEST (2010)

ドナドナ (Dona Dona) is the nineteenth album by the Japanese rock group Plastic Tree. It peaked at number 28 on Oricon Albums Chart.

== Track listing ==
No.	Title	Length
1.	"1999"	4:59
2.	"梟 Fukurou (Donna Donna version)"	5:05
3.	"etcetera"	4:14
4.	"sunset bloody sunset"	4:43
5.	"Consent (Donna Donna version)"	5:27
6.	"ががじ Gagaji"	3:44
7.	"Sanatorium (Donna Donna version)"	5:41
8.	"Donna Donna"	5:33
9.	"---Anten."	6:54
10.	"易しさ 倶楽部 Yasashisa kurabu"	2:03
