= Puppet Show (album) =

Studio album by Plastic Tree
- Released: August 28, 1998
- Genre: Alternative Rock Noise Rock Neo-Psychedelia
- Length: 47:55
- Label: Warner Music Japan

Plastic Tree chronology
Hide and Seek (1997)	Puppet Show (1998)	Parade (2000)

Puppet Show is the second full-length album by the Japanese rock group Plastic Tree released on August 28, 1998.

== Track listing ==
No.	Title	Length
1.	"Intro"	0:57
2.	"May Day"	3:25
3.	"リセット Reset"	3:31
4.	"絶望の丘 Zetsubou no oka"	4:33
5.	"幻燈機械 Gentou Kikai"	7:24
6.	"ぬけがら nukegara"	3:31
7.	"本当の嘘 Hontou no uso"	4:32
8.	"Monophobia"	2:23
9.	"クリーム Cream"	4:32
10.	"3月5日。 Sangatsu Itsuka"	5:48
11.	"サーカス Circus"	7:19
