= Nega to Poji =

Studio album by Plastic Tree
- Released: June 27, 2007
- Genre: Alternative Rock
- Length: 1:07:24
- Label: Universal Music

Plastic Tree chronology
Chandelier (2006)	Nega to Poji (2007)	Plastic Tree (EP) (What is "Plastic Tree"?) (2007)

Nega to Poji (Japanese: 「ネガとポジ」) is the fourteenth album by the Japanese rock group Plastic Tree. It peaked at number 36 on Oricon Albums Chart.

== Track listing ==
No.	Title	Length
1.	"眠れる森 (Nemureru Mori) [Sleeping Forest]"	5:40
2.	"不純物 (Fujunbutsu) [Impurities]"	3:48
3.	"エレジー (Eregy)"	3:41
4.	"スピカ (Spica) (Nega to Poji Ver.)"	5:08
5.	"ザザ降り、ザザ鳴り。(Zaza furi, zaza nari) [Zaza Down, Zaza Sounds.]"	4:25
6.	"無人駅 (Mujin Eki) [Ghost Station]"	4:24
7.	"オレンジ (Orange)"	5:03
8.	"Sabbath"	4:01
9.	"Egg"	3:01
10.	"涙腺回路 (Ruisen Kairo) [Lacrimal gland circuit]"	4:31
11.	"黒い傘 (Kuroi Kasa) [Black Umbrella]"	6:10
12.	"アンドロメタモルフォーゼ (Andro Metamorphose)"	8:12
13.	"真っ赤な糸 (Makka na Ito) [Bright Red Yarn]"	4:35
14.	"ヘイト・レッド、ディップ・イット (Hate. Red, Dip.It) (Loudest Sound Edition)"	4:40
