= Plastic Tree =

Japanese alternative rock band

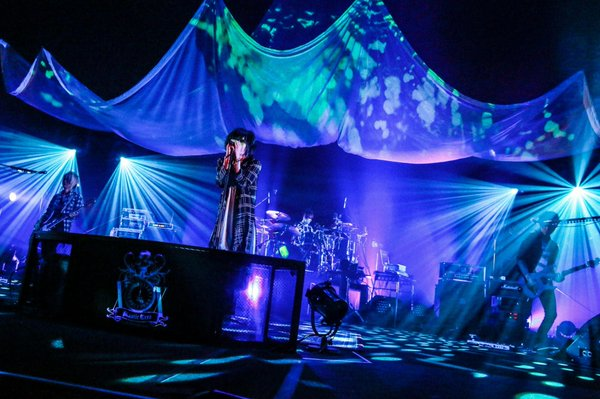
- Plastic Tree performing in 2014

Background information
- Origin: Chiba Prefecture, Japan
- Genres: Alternative rock; shoegaze; dream pop; garage rock; noise pop; visual kei
- Years active: 1993–present
- Labels: Gio Records (1995–1997); Warner Music Japan (1997–2001); Entrance (1997–1998); Sweet Heart Records (2001 and 2003); Atmark Corporation (2002); Universal Music Japan (2003–2004 and 2006–2010); Sick Room Records (2003–2005); J-Rock (2005); Akatsuki label (2007–present); Tokuma Japan Communications (2010-2012); Flying Star (2012-2015); CJ Victor (2015-present)
- Members: Ryutaro Arimura; Akira Nakayama; Tadashi Hasegawa; Kenken Sato
- Past members: Koji/ Shin; Takashi; Hiroshi Sasabuchi

Plastic Tree are a Japanese alternative rock band. Formed in December 1993 in Chiba Prefecture, they released their first mini-album in December 1995, and in 1997, they released their first single on a major label.

== History ==
=== Biography ===
Plastic Tree, also known as PuraTuri (プラトゥリ) or Pura (プラ) to fans, was formed in December 1993 originally under the name of NTT FUCKS then later decided on Plastic Tree, aiming for "something abstract and natural at the same time", as Ryutaro puts it.

In 1995, they released their first mini-album Kimyou na Kajitsu: Strange Fruits after changing drummers twice. Two years later, they released their first single, "Wareta Mado", with Warner Music Japan, their first release on a major label.

Plastic Tree made their first overseas tour in 2006, named the Chandelier Tour, and performed concerts in France, Germany and Finland.

On February 23, 2009, Hiroshi Sasabuchi announced his resignation as the band's drummer after having been with the band for seven years. On July 3, 2009, Kenken Sato was announced as the band's new drummer. Since forming, the band has had four drummers.

== Sound and style ==
Early in their career, their music had heavy visual kei influences. As time went on, their sound seemed to change and evolve with every album. Plastic Tree combines alternative rock with art rock, electronic, and heavy metal. Their sound is a blend of raw melody, with the occasional orchestral backing track. However, the band does not think that they should be placed into any specific genre. Plastic Tree claim that their sound has been considerably influenced by British bands such as Radiohead and The Cure.

The most easily recognizable signature of Plastic Tree's music is the melodic, childlike voice of Ryūtarō Arimura. Their sound is also aided by Arimura's abstract lyrics. All four band members collaborate to write songs and lyrics, with Arimura writing most of the lyrics.

== Band members ==
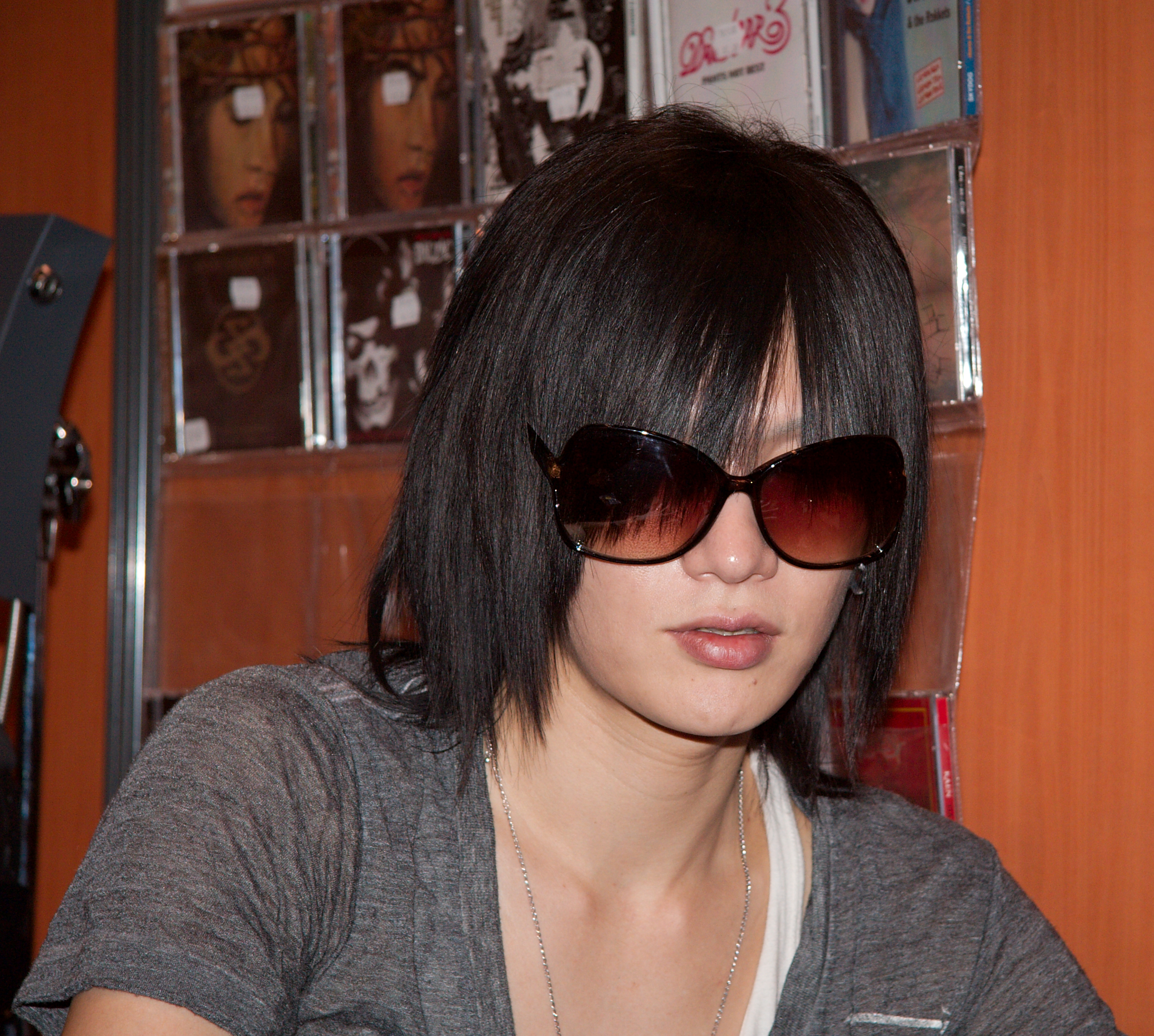
Arimura at an autograph session at Japan Expo 2007

=== Current members ===
- Ryutaro Arimura (有村 竜太朗) – lead vocals, rhythm guitar (1993–present)
- Akira Nakayama(ナカヤマ アキラ) – lead guitar (1993–present)
- Tadashi Hasegawa (長谷川 正) – bass guitar (1993–present)
- Kenken Sato (佐藤 ケンケン) – drums (2009–present)

=== Former members ===
- Shin – drums (1993–1996)
- Takashi Ōshōdani (大正谷 隆) – drums (1996–2001)
- Hiroshi Sasabuchi (ササブチ ヒロシ) – drums (2001–2009)

== Discography ==
=== Singles ===
	Release date	Title
Indie	September 25, 1996	Rira no ki
1st	June 25, 1997	Wareta Mado
2nd	February 15, 1998	Hontou no Uso
3rd	July 25, 1998	Zetsubou no Oka
4th	March 10, 1999	Tremolo
5th	August 25, 1999	Sink
6th	December 10, 1999	Tsumetai Hikari
7th	April 19, 2000	Slide
8th	July 12, 2000	Rocket
9th	February 7, 2001	Planetarium
10th	November 14, 2001	Chiriyuku Bokura
11th	June 26, 2002	Aoi Tori
12th	May 21, 2003	Baka ni Natta Noni
13th	July 25, 2003	Moshimo Piano ga Hiketanara
14th	October 1, 2003	Mizuiro Girlfriend
15th	January 21, 2004	Yuki Hotaru
16th	March 10, 2004	Harusaki Sentimental
17th	July 28, 2004	Melancholic
18th	May 11, 2005	Sanbika
19th	October 12, 2005	Namae no Nai Hana
20th	November 16, 2005	Ghost
21st	December 14, 2005	Kuuchuu Buranko
22nd	May 10, 2006	Namida Drop
23rd	January 23, 2007	Spica
24th	May 16, 2007	Makka na Ito
25th	April 9, 2008	Alone Again, Wonderful World
26th	August 13, 2008	Replay/dolly
27th	June 10, 2009	Fukurou
28th	October 28, 2009	Sanatorium
29th	July 28, 2010	Moonlight-----.
30th	December 15, 2010	Mirai Iro
31st	February 29, 2012	Joumyaku
32nd	June 20, 2012	Kuchizuke
33rd	September 5, 2012	Shion
34th	September 4, 2013	Doukou
35th	September 3, 2014	Mime
36th	March 4, 2015	Slow
37th	September 2, 2015	Rakka
38th	August 17, 2016	Silent Noise
39th	January 25, 2017	Nenriki
40th	June 21, 2017	Uchuu Yuuei
41st	July 25, 2018	Inside Out
42nd	September 4, 2019	Senzou
43rd	July 19, 2023	Azabana
44th	December 13, 2023	Zawameki

=== Albums ===
	Release date	Title
1st	October 9, 1997; August 25, 2010 (Re-edition)	Hide and Seek
2nd	August 26, 1998; August 25, 2010 (Re-edition)	Puppet Show
3rd	August 23, 2000; August 25, 2010 (Re-edition)	Parade
4th	September 21, 2002	Träumerei
5th	October 27, 2003	Shiro Chronicle
6th	August 25, 2004	Cell
7th	June 28, 2006	Chandelier
8th	June 27, 2007	Nega to Poji
9th	September 24, 2008	Utsusemi
10th	December 23, 2009	Dona Dona
11th	April 6, 2011	Ammonite
12th	December 12, 2012	Ink
13th	December 23, 2015	Hakusei
14th	March 7, 2018	doorAdore
15th	March 25, 2020	Jusshokuteiri
16th	May 29, 2024	Plastic Tree

=== Mini albums ===
	Release date	Title
Indie	December 11, 1995	Strange Fruits -Kimyou na Kajitsu-
1st	March 5, 2014	echo

=== "Best of" albums ===
	Release date	Title
1st	March 27, 2001	Cut ~Early Songs Best Selection~
2nd	November 14, 2001; September 6, 2006 (Re-edition)	Single Collection
3rd	November 7, 2002; August 25, 2010 (Re-edition)	Premium Best
4th	October 26, 2005	Best Album Shiro Ban
5th	October 26, 2005	Best Album Kuro Ban
6th	September 5, 2007	B-Men Gahou
7th	August 26, 2009	Gestalt Houkai
8th	July 7, 2010	ALL TIME THE BEST
9th	February 13, 2019	Zoku B-Men Gahou
10th	April 28, 2022	(Re)quest

=== Other albums ===
	Release date	Title
Overseas release	July 13, 2007	Plastic Tree "e.p." What is "Plastic Tree"?

=== DVD ===
Type	Release date	Title
Live	April 3, 1996	Alice's sleeping bag
PV Collection	March 23, 1997	Innocent Picture Show
PV Collection	October 19, 2011 (VHS); February 9, 2005 (DVD)	Nijigen Orugōru
PV Collection	November 8, 2000 (VHS); November 22, 2000 (DVD)	Nijigen Orugōru 2
Live	March 21, 2002	Kuro Tent
Live	December 18, 2002	Kuro Tent 2
PV Collection	December 22, 2004	Nijigen Orugōru 3
Live	March 29, 2006; November 21, 2007 (Re-edition)	Hana moete, bourei no namida, tenmaku ni ochiru.
Live	December 19, 2007; November 12, 2008	Zero
Live	December 24, 2008; November 4, 2009 (Limited re-edition)	Merry Go Around The World
Live	November 25, 2009	Tent
PV Collection	December 23, 2009	Gestalt houkai -Eizou hen-
Live	July 7, 2010	Shugyoku to himitsu kouen
Live	October 27, 2010	Ch.P
Live	September 7, 2011	Yuku pura kita pura
Live	December 14, 2011	Ammonite Jitsuen-Ban
Live	March 20, 2013	Hide and Seek" -Tsukai Kouen
Live	June 19, 2013	Tent 3
TV program	December 17, 2014	Plastic Tree no Sen Pura
Live	February 11, 2015	Soshite Parade wa Tsuzuku

== In popular culture ==
- "Sink" was used as the eighth ending song for the anime Kindaichi Case Files.
- "Namida Drop" was used as the first ending song for the anime Garasu no Kantai.
- "Mirai Iro" was used as the fifth ending song for the anime Yu-Gi-Oh! 5D's.
- "Silent Noise" was used as the opening song for the Visual novel Collar_×_Malice.
