= List of Medaka Box characters =

Medaka Box (Japanese: めだかボックス, Hepburn: Medaka Bokkusu), a manga series written by Nisio Isin and illustrated by Akira Akatsuki, follows the efforts of Student Council President Medaka Kurokami, a young woman with extraordinary capabilities, as she works to improve Hakoniwa Academy, along with her closest friend, Zenkichi Hitoyoshi.^{Ch. 1} The Hokoniwa Academy population consists of several groups of students. The Specials are scholarship students whose abilities allow them to excel in a specific area. They include Student Council members Kouki Akune and Mogana Kikajima. The Abnormals are students who possess overwhelming capabilities such that they are dominated by that aspect; they are unable to relate to normal people, and typically have a superiority complex; Medaka herself is one of these. The antithesis to the Abnormals are Minuses; their abnormalities as destructive expressions of mental illnesses, chronic depression, being mentally shut off from the world, and possibly a complementary inferiority complex. The students who lack any special abilities are known as Normals.

== Main characters ==
=== Medaka Kurokami ===
- Voiced by: Aki Toyosaki (Japanese); Shelley Calene-Black (English)

Medaka Kurokami (黒神 めだか, Kurokami Medaka) is the student body president of Hakoniwa Academy, having garnered 98% of the student vote in her first year. Beautiful, well-endowed, and having no reservations in showing off,^{Ch. 1, 5, 8} she excels in academics, sports, and just about any activity she tries, with seemingly inhuman results.^{Ch. 1} At the start of the story, she institutes a suggestion box for various tasks that the students feel would improve the academy.^{Ch. 1} She originally plans that only she and her dear friend Zenkichi Hitoyoshi run the student council, but as the story progresses, she recruits more people to fill the council positions. She enjoys helping others and is determined to finish any task handed to her, rewarding herself with a pot of flowers, and hoping that one day she can look outside the council window to see the academy full of flowers.^{Ch. 1}

Medaka grew up in a family of five: her father, her 'legal' mother, her older sister, her older brother, and herself. Her biological mother, the mistress of her father, died from a heart attack directly after childbirth and Medaka believed it was because her mother's sole purpose in life was to give birth to her. Because of her abnormal abilities, she quickly matured and was selected to be part of the Flask Project. However, she ran away after being confronted with the realization that life has no meaning. Shortly afterward, she met Zenkichi Hitoyoshi for the first time; when he showed genuine happiness and amazement for her remarkable abilities, he told her that her purpose in life was to make the people around her happy. Thus, Medaka was reborn and the unbreakable bond between Zenkichi and Medaka begun. She despises her older brother but at the same time holds some degree of begrudging respect for him. She looks up to her older sister and loves her deeply. However, she unwittingly feels lonely because of her incredible abilities and the company of others has actually allowed her to restrain the true extent of her power.

Medaka and Zenkichi have been friends since they were two years old.^{Ch. 1} In middle school, Medaka had a classmate whom she tried to help but failed to do so. Her failure to do so ended in the death of another classmate, Ajimu, and Medaka was emotionally scarred. In hopes of protecting her, Zenkichi vowed to prevent anyone similar from getting close to her again, which Medaka is secretly grateful for. During Zenkichi's fight with Munakata, Medaka confesses her love for Zenkichi to the other Student Council members and breaks down in tears when Zenkichi falls to Munakata. After Medaka was brainwashed, the bond between Medaka and Zenkichi enables him to return her back from her old personality. In more recent events, Medaka has expressed an interest in Zenkichi since he challenged her to a duel (which she has been eagerly waiting). After the new student council election, Medaka confesses that she has fallen for him.

Medaka's abnormality, identified as "The End" (完成（ジ エンド）, Ji Endo) by Naze, is her ability to copy and master other people's abnormalities. It is this ability that draws the interest of the Flask Plan, as she appears to be the one person who can achieve the ideal of the "Perfect Person". It has been commented, by herself no less, that only she can hold this ability, because she is a beast, and no human would be able to withstand it. When Oudo tried to steal her abnormality with his "Unreasonable Taxation" abnormality, he stated that it was, "Dark enough to black out the sun". He noticed that his arm appeared to have melted, however this was an illusion and most likely the results of him trying to take an ability too powerful for him to handle. However, her abnormality has proved to be a double-edged sword, as she is unable to stop herself from taking on and enhancing an ability when she experiences it. If she were to copy and perfect a Minus abnormality, it would not serve any positive purpose and would undoubtedly cause her harm.

In the Unknown Shiranui arc, after coming back to life, she is called to save the world. Apparently, Fukurou has created a style, Testament User, that activates after he dies. This style draws the moon to the earth. Medaka then left to destroy the moon.

According to Zenkichi: "That day, the moon disappeared from our sky. And Medaka-chan never returned.". However, Medaka reappeared during her class's graduation, having survived and gone on several fantastic adventures in space before returning. Medaka then decided to leave school to work for her family's Zaibatsu, but not before defeating the entire school to collect a farewell message.

In the final chapter, when the cast meets again in their high school reunion, Medaka, along with the other main characters, has lost all of her abilities with age, but gained the ability to be loved by animals, the only skill she lacked in her youth. Zenkichi challenges Medaka to a final duel. If he wins, she must marry him. Medaka counters this that if SHE wins, HE must marry her. Zenkichi proceeds to begin the fight.

=== Zenkichi Hitoyoshi ===
- Voiced by: Yūki Ono (Japanese); Andrew Love (English)

Zenkichi Hitoyoshi (人吉 善吉, Hitoyoshi Zenkichi) is the childhood friend of Medaka, and the Student Council General Affairs Manager.^{Ch. 1} (Note: In the one-shot, Medaka assigns Zenkichi Hitoyoshi the position of Vice-President.) He reluctantly joined for the sake of protecting Medaka.^{Ch. 1} Zenkichi shows enthusiasm towards Medaka's cause for helping others, but he will punish anyone who opposes that cause.^{Ch. 1} It is later revealed that he is the one who reformed Medaka into her current personality. He has feelings for her.^{Ch. 1} Little is known about Zenkichi's past except that he has been with Medaka since they were two years old.^{Ch. 1} The relationship between Shiranui and Zenkichi is frequently commented on by their classmates, often negatively, on how they interact with each other. Shiranui has commented that she is only friends with him when she is in the mood. Ironically, Shiranui's grandfather notes that Zenkichi is probably the only person who can get along with Shiranui. Zenkichi eventually reveals his feelings directly to Medaka before sacrificing himself to destroy Kumagawa.

Zenkichi is noted to be a "normal" individual, one with no special abilities. Medaka's brother, Maguro, takes special interest in him because no matter how much he is discouraged or fails, he stands back up. Zenkichi has vowed to protect Medaka ever since she was emotionally scarred after failing to help a classmate in middle school. In order to become stronger, he has undertaken Maguro's hellish training sessions along with Medaka. Zenkichi is revealed to be a master of Savate, having honed his skill to such an extent that he possesses an almost impenetrable defense. According to Zenkichi, he learned this style because he fears fighting and uses it to disarm opponents and take away their desire to fight. He also studied on how to disassemble guns, and rocket launchers, just in case something ever happened to Medaka. Thanks to this display of skill, the Flask Plan is very interested in him, believing him to have the potential to become an Abnormal. However, it has been repeatedly iterated that Zenkichi, despite his remarkable abilities, is still only "normal." If standard human limits are applied though, Zenkichi has long since passed the line of a "normal"; for instance, when he caused a small earthquake with his stomp. Even if it was biologically possible, a man of Zenkichi's weight and mass would find it impossible.

During the moments of unconsciousness after he sacrifices himself to defeat Kumagawa, Zenkichi meets Ajimu, who had been killed by Kumagawa and helps him recover his eyesight by granting him one of her own abilities – "Parasite Eyes", which allows Zenkichi to see another person's perspective of the world. However, Zenkichi dislikes his new ability and avoids using it unless necessary, often expressing distaste for how he is no longer normal. The ability is later modified into "Model Zenkichi" by Shiranui, which allows Zenkichi to see the limitations of his opponents instead.

Because of Zenkichi's otherwise normal nature, Ajimu exposes Medaka to the potential successors, who are also normal girls, destroying the appeal that Zenkichi's "normalness" has for her. Ajimu then mocks the broken boy, listing off some of the most famous protagonists in manga and pointing out how he has nothing in common with any of them. To remain by Medaka's side, Zenkichi accepts Ajimu's offer to become a main character by using the Flask Plan. In order to defeat Medaka by becoming the next Student Council President, Zenkichi is given a specially made ability created by Hanten Shiranui: "Devil Style", an Abnormal ability that nullifies any coincidence, allowing Zenkichi to enter any venture without luck or the whims of fate interfering with it, thus making any endeavor completely fair. This ability flies in the face of Ajimu's idea of a "main character" as most are known to be incredibly lucky. He is now one of the only characters, alongside Youka Naze, Misogi Kumagawa, Najimi Ajimu, and Kamome Tsurubami, to possess more than one abnormality or minus. At the end of the second semester, he defeats Medaka in an election and becomes the 100th Student Council President.

In the final chapter, when the cast meets again in their high school reunion, Zenkichi challenges Medaka to a final duel. If he wins, she must marry him. Medaka counters this that if SHE wins, HE must marry her. Zenkichi points out the conditions are basically the same but then proceeds to begin the fight.

== Hakoniwa Academy ==
=== Student council ===
Medaka recruits the following student council members in addition to Zenkichi.

==== Misogi Kumagawa ====
- Voiced by: Megumi Ogata (Japanese); Leraldo Anzaldua (English)

Misogi Kumagawa (球磨川 禊, Kumagawa Misogi), Minus Name: All Fiction (大嘘憑き, Ōru Fikushon), Book Maker (却本作り, Bukku Meika) is formally the Student Council President of his former middle school and an antagonist main and ending of Medaka Box, Kumagawa becomes the vice-president of the Student Council under Medaka. Medaka describes Kumagawa as a compulsive liar who places no meaning in trust or doubt, while Hitomi Hitoyoshi considers him developmentally retarded. Misogi Kumagawa describes Hitomi Hitoyoshi as his "first love", and apparently has a strange fetish for panties and adult women who look much younger than they are. Despite his intensely negative attitude, his intentions appear to be ultimately good – Kumagawa wants to create an equal world and fight for the oppressed, but has insane and idiotic anime-related ideas about how to go about it. He does not seem very interested in more ordinary people, as he described Zenkichi as a "boring guy". However, he views humans as humans, has a conscience, tends to randomly heal or help strangers as well, and experiences shock and pain when those who stood by his side, such as Emukae, are hurt. Despite the immensely negative personality that Kumagawa possesses, he is always seen smiling no matter how much trauma or horror that he is subjected to.

During Kumagawa's early appearances, his face was never seen, it was either shrouded in shadow or covered by his hair. He used to carry around a macabre stuffed rabbit as a child (which held his first screw) and as a middle schooler was shown to be capable of solving complex puzzles in seconds. At some point he mostly sealed off the virtually omnipotent immortal psychopath Ajimu from reality, which led Medaka to mistakenly think that he had killed an innocent woman, and attack him in a fit of rage, resulting in him leaving the school. Upon realizing that she could not help him, which went against everything that she believed herself to be capable of, she was left emotionally scarred. The scar has still not yet healed, as this day she still berates herself over not being able to do anything positive for him. Much to Medaka and Zenkichi's horror, Misogi transfers into Hakoniwa Academy after the destruction of the Flask Plan. His very nature caused him to absorb all the negative aspects of the people he met; he failed at everything and lost to everyone at everything. Medaka attempted to sympathize with him and reform him, like she had done to her other classmates, but Misogi proved to be beyond her influence.

As a child, Kumagawa was tested for any abnormalities, but was believed to be normal. However, it later turned out to be far too great to be detected or measured. He possesses the Minus ability "All Fiction" which allows him to deny reality absolutely. With it, he can take any action done and undo it, and take anything that was made and unmake it. Wounds he inflicts can be instantly cured as if they never were, because they were not, and people who can see can be made blind as if they had never seen, since they had not; it can also undo death making himself effectively immortal. This ability is so strong and so immense, Kumagawa himself confesses that if he should lose control, the entire world would be unmade. The ability's one weakness is that the only thing it cannot undo is itself: anything it unmade or undid cannot be remade or redone by its action alone; it also seems limited in that it cannot undo minuses, after his failed attempt on Mukae it actually evolved her ability further. This ability, however, is not his original Minus; "All Fiction" was a Minus that resulted when he altered a separate ability granted him by Najimi Ajimu. His original Minus is a skill called "Book Maker", which takes the form of a javelin-sized wood screw. It allows him to make anyone it strikes gain all his weaknesses and limitations, experience the same emotional turmoil he does, and potentially become a Minus themselves. In one-on-one combat, Kumagawa uses giant screws that materialize from nowhere and can control their size and type at will.

Kumagawa is eventually defeated by Medaka during the battle against the Student Council and admits his love for her. He subsequently accepts Medaka's offer to become the Vice President of the Student Council, completing the group's ranks, and providing the necessary different perspective that Medaka wanted in order to balance the viewpoints of her executives. Despite the former animosity held toward him, Kumagawa becomes a welcomed member of the Student Council and fulfills his intended role well. He instantly and brutally reduces the number of potential successors to five normal girls and instantly recognizes that they are "Not Equals". Enduring their torture and abuse with an amicable attitude, he soon wins their admiration when he defends them from bullying. However, because of his changing perspective of life, the seal he originally placed on Ajimu has gradually begun to weaken. In response to Kikaijima and the five recruits's request to stop the battle between Medaka and Zenkichi, he forms the "Naked Apron Alliance" based on the Shinsengumi's battle tactics and regains the use of "All Fiction"; albeit less complete than before as it is restricted so that it cannot undo anything with strong emotional attachment. This also limits his immortality to such that if his fight with Zenkichi were to be replayed out, he would effectively die.

After Anshin'in's death at the hands of Iihiko Shishime, an unconscious Kumagawa comes across an afterimage of her, presenting him with two of her skills. The first is "Hundred Gauntlets" which according to her can help him perfect his "All Fiction" skill, and the other is "Unskilled", which nullifies and blocks all his skills for an interval of three minutes. He later becomes student council president after Medaka's destruction of the moon and subsequent disappearance, though he made a bet with her that she would return. When she does finally return, Kumagawa realizes that he has "won" for the first time in his life and begins to cry tears of joy.

==== Kouki Akune ====
- Voiced by: Daisuke Namikawa (Japanese); Tyler Galindo (English)

Kouki Akune (阿久根 高貴, Akune Kouki) is the Student Council Secretary.^{Ch. 6} He is introduced to the series as a second-year student in the judo club. Akune has been infatuated with Medaka since middle school; he dislikes Zenkichi for his being able to spend so much time with her.^{Ch. 4} In middle school, he had been a violent delinquent known as the "Destroyer" and had been assigned by Kumagawa, the president of the middle school Student Council, to beat Medaka. While she was injured, she did not fight back; Akune continued until Zenkichi gathered a group of Medaka's supporters to avenge her. When Medaka stopped Zenkichi from hurting Akune, Akune immediately developed feelings for her, which she refuses, and gradually becomes less violent and shows little desire to actually hurt others.

Because of his natural fighting abilities, Akune is known as the "Prince of Judo".^{Ch. 5} His captain, Nabeshima, arranges a match between him and Zenkichi, where if he wins he would succeed her as captain, otherwise he would have to quit. Akune wins the first nine points, but loses the tenth and the match. After Nabeshima informs Medaka that Akune has excellent handwriting, he joins the Student Council as its secretary. ^{Ch. 6} Both he and Kikaijima are considered Specials, but not Abnormals. Though primarily expressed in his fighting skills, Akune's ability is being able to copy other people's abilities, though to a lesser extent than Medaka's similar ability, "The End". As Akune gradually realizes, he has a tendency to shape his personality according to how he believes others need him to be.

==== Mogana Kikaijima ====
- Voiced by: Ai Kayano (Japanese); Maggie Flecknoe (English)

Mogana Kikaijima (喜界島 もがな, Kikaijima Mogana) is originally the ace of the swim team, Kikaijima serves as the treasurer of the Student Council. She is close friends with Yakushima (the swim club captain) and Tanegashima (the swim club vice-captain); they all share an incredible obsession with money for personal reasons and want to gain enough money to fill a pool and swim in it. When Kikaijima was a child, her father left because the family was in debt, and her mother became sick from working herself into the ground. All the people that Kikaijima had thought were friends left her because her family had no money. Kikaijima believed that "anyone would be sad if they lost their wallet, but if we died, nobody would care." Medaka corrects her by saying that if they died, she would be sad for them. Afterward, Kikaijima is recruited as the treasurer, and is the only member of the group who is paid for her job.

Though Medaka successfully reforms Kikaijima from her old ways, it still does not keep her from being obsessed with money. Shortly after she joins the Student Council, she charges Zenkichi for accidentally seeing her changing and then again for insulting her, and one last time for saying she had a great body. She develops strong relationships with the Student Council members, particularly Medaka and Zenkichi, after being encouraged by Yakushima and Tanegashima to make friends outside of the swim club. Like Akune, she is regarded as a "special" and is one of the school's many scholarship students. Kikaijima has an incredible lung capacity, allowing her to hold her breath for a month if she chooses. She can also focus her voice as a sound cannon and destroy physical objects with ultrasonic shrieks. Her ability can also be used as a form of echolocation, though Kikaijima must be accompanied by someone who can act as a receiver for the reflected sound waves, such as Medaka or Kibougaoka. As a result of her past desire to acquire money, she is also capable of performing high-level calculations of probability for gambling purposes.

=== Class 13 ===
This is a class consisting entirely of students possessing abnormalities. Many are involved with the Flask Plan, an experiment overseen by the Headmaster of Hakoniwa Academy to create a Perfect Human. Most members of Class 13 are notorious for not attending class and are generally indifferent to expectations.

Myouri Unzen (雲仙 冥利, Unzen Myouri)
Project name: Monster Child (モンスターチャイルド, Monsutā Chairudo)
Voiced by: Romi Park (Japanese); Greg Ayres (English)
A high school junior at only ten years old, Myouri Unzen is a child prodigy and the leader of the school's Enforcers Squad. He is known to go overboard in his methods to bring about justice, but his motto is "Justice is nothing if you don't go overboard!" In his first (shown) act as an Enforcer, he beats the school Orchestra (male and female) bloody and destroys all their instruments. Unlike Medaka who loves people and thinks they are good inside, Myouri hates people and believes they are evil by nature. He also seems to be quite perverted for his young age, and possess a fetish for big breasted women. After his defeat by Medaka, he reveals the Flask Plan and turns down her offer to join the Student Council as Vice President.
Myouri appears to be an Abnormal among Abnormals. Of the thirteen members of the Flask Plan, he is one among the seven who are able break the complicated code of characters and numbers necessary to use the Flask Building elevator. His most frequently used weapons are super elastic bouncy balls, created by scientists of the Flask Plan. He is able to fully calculate the trajectory of each one of his balls no matter how many he throws. His secondary weapons are similar in size and shape to the super bouncy balls, but they are balls full of gunpowder. For these he lets them out onto the floor of a contained area and then has to light them externally. His trump card: balls with nigh-indestructible wires coiled around inside. As he throws these balls they bounce around their target and the surrounding walls, letting the string out as they travel. These balls form a web so to speak that renders its victim immobile. This weapon is also a one use item, as Myouri does not want to take the time to re-ravel the thread.

==== The Front Six ====
Recognized as the primary members of the Class 13, the Front Six consist of students whose abnormalities became refined and highly developed under the Flask Plan, mostly under the direction of Youka Naze. Unlike the Plus Six, they are actively involved in the Flask Plan and are the first opponents that Medaka has genuine difficulty attempting to defeat.

Shigusa Takachiho (高千穂 仕種, Takachiho Shigusa)
Project name: Hard Wrapping (棘毛布, Hādo Rappingu)
Voiced by: Kenji Nomura (Japanese); Christopher Ayres (English)
The strongest of class 13, Takachiho's abnormality is his heightened reflexes. Because his reflexes allow him to automatically dodge anything, he has never gotten hurt until he fought with Medaka. His abnormality emerged when he was a child – a car crash killed his family, but his reflexes allowed him to survive unharmed. Since then, he has secretly harbored a desire to be touched, but believes it is impossible because his reflexes instantly prevent contact from others. Shigusa incorrectly states that Medaka's abnormality is to turn off her reflexes, when in fact it is that she is able to mimic other's abnormalities. In the end, Medaka came out victorious because Shigusa's muscles could no longer keep up with his reflexes.
Kei Munakata (宗像 形, Munakata Kei)
Project name: Last Carpet (枯れた樹海, Rasuto Kāpetto)
Voiced by: Hiroshi Kamiya (Japanese); Clint Bickham (English)
A senior of Class 13. From the day he turned five, Munakata has harboured incredibly powerful homicidal impulses, driving him on to kill anyone and everyone he looks at. Despite this, he knows killing is wrong and learns how to use a vast and diverse arsenal of hidden weapons as a way to keep people at a distance so he would not hurt them. His weapons range from his bare hands to explosives. However, he is not exceptionally skilled at using all his weapons and his true ability lies in his skill at concealing implausible quantities of weapons upon his person to use at will. Contrary to what is expected, he is even more dangerous when he is unarmed because he gains incredible speed without being weighed down by all his hidden weapons and remains skilled in unarmed combat and assassination techniques. After losing a fight to Zenkichi and finally gaining a friend to relieve his loneliness, his impulses have died down, and he has gained a great deal more control. His desire to kill is extinguished after he challenges and kills Misogi Kumagawa, who manages to bring himself back to life after regaining his ability "All Fiction."
Itami Koga (古賀 いたみ, Koga Itami)
Project name: Best Pain (骨折り指切り, Besuto Pein)
Voiced by: Madoka Yonezawa (Japanese); Cynthia Martinez (English)
Originally a very normal high school girl, Koga desired an abnormal lifestyle and pleaded with Youka Naze to make her life abnormal. They became "best" friends ever since, and Koga is extremely loyal to Naze and proud of her status as an Abnormal. As a result of Naze's experiments, Koga gained incredible recovery abilities and had everything unnecessary removed by Naze, though her ability to sense pain was left intact. Akune realizes in his fight against Koga that because she was originally an ordinary human, her super-human strength puts excessive tension on her muscles. Without her pain system, Koga would have no way of knowing when her muscles were at their limit. To defeat her, Akune utilizes a pinning move that drains all of Koga's energy. She is brutally hurt when Oudo uses his "Unreasonable Taxation" to copy her abilities, though she is saved, and her body is reconstructed by Maguro and Naze.
Youka Naze (名瀬 夭歌, Naze Youka)
Project name: Black White (黒い包帯, Burakku Howaito)
Voiced by: Miyuki Sawashiro (Japanese); Kara Greenberg (English)
The researcher for Class 13 and current supervisor of the Flask Plan, Youka Naze's real name is Kujira Kurokami (黒神 くじら, Kurokami Kujira). She is the older sister of Medaka and the younger sister of Maguro. While attractive and possessing a strong resemblance to Medaka, she favors concealing her face behind bandages and embeds a knife in her forehead because she dislikes the attention her face attracts. As Naze, she was once a classmate of Akune. Disgusted with the lack of dissatisfying elements in her life, the burdens of having a loving family and similarly extraordinary abilities, she became extremely stoic and driven to find something to make her miserable in life. Unable to achieve this goal, she ran away and erased her memories to become "Youka Naze". Naze has little interest in the Flask Plan, using it only to further her scientific experiments on becoming normal. The only thing she truly values is her "best friend" Koga, the only person not to be intimidated by her overwhelming abnormality. Naze's abnormality appears to be analysis, similar to her brother, and an understanding of biology that allows her to remodel her body in short periods of time. Her preferred weapons are syringes. During her battle against Shibuki, she remodels herself and develops her own Minus Abnormality, "Ice Fire" (凍る火柱, Aisu Faia), which allows her to control the temperature of her body and nearby objects to freeze and burn things at will.
Despite her disagreeable personality and tendency to complain, she and Koga willingly aid the Student Council after Class 13 is disbanded. Naze volunteers to take the position of Vice-President in order to complete the necessary numbers to counter Kumagawa's challenge and threatens Zenkichi into allowing her to train him for the General Manager's battle. She comes to recognize Kikaijima, Akune, and Zenkichi as people who genuinely care about her and after defeating Shibuki in the Secretary's battle, Naze is able to reconcile with her younger sister. She displays both Yandere and Tsundere traits, such as threatening Zenkichi while offering him help and being gruff when she offers to become the Vice-President. She is later appointed to become the Vice-President of the Student Council under Zenkichi.
Mizou Yukuhashi (行橋 未造, Yukuhashi Mizou)
Project name: Rabbit Labyrinth (狭き門, Rabbito Rabirinsu)
Voiced by: Kana Asumi (Japanese); Meg McDonald (English)
A small masked boy who is usually seen around Oudo, Yukuhashi's abnormality is to feel the emotions of other people so strongly that it is as though he is reading their minds. The downside to this power is he is so in tune to others' emotions that he even feels their fatigue and pain. Because he could not control his own powers, he was being driven almost insane by the constant babble of the thoughts of all the people and machines around him. His abnormality is considered the polar opposite of Oudo; while Oudo can be thought of as a transmitter of electromagnetic waves, Yukuhashi is a receiver for electromagnetic waves. Upon meeting Oudo, all he heard in his head was silence due to Oudo's overwhelming projection of himself; because he had finally found peace and quiet, Yukuhashi has stuck to Oudo ever since. Because his ability allows him to feel his opponent's feelings, Yukuhashi prefers not to physically fight and resorts to mental manipulation and tactics to win.
Oudo Miyakonojou (都城 王土, Miyakonojou Oudo)
Project name: Create (創帝, Kurieito)
Voiced by: Kiyoshi Katsunuma (Japanese); Jay Hickman (English)
Self-proclaimed King of the World, Oudo believes he was born a king and everyone else a servant to him. He takes a special interest in Medaka right from the start and wishes for her to be his wife. His abnormality can be described as mind-control because he is able to send electromagnetic waves into his opponent's brain. With this ability he has able to force other to obey his commands, which he usually limits to making people bow in his presence. Oudo utilizes this technique to awaken Medaka's original personality, though his original intent had been to brainwash her into someone sub-servant only to him. Despite the extraordinary extent of his powers, he has been unable to control them and they have warped his sense of self.
Oudo's abnormality manifests as two distinct abilities involving his ability to emit electromagnetic waves. The first is described as "Weighted Words", which allow him to transmit electromagnetic waves to seize control of the physical actions of others by issuing a spoken command and brainwashing others from physical contact. His second ability is known as "Unreasonable Taxation", allowing him to completely steal another person's abnormality, completely taking it by copying the electromagnetic wave patterns of another person.

==== Plus Six ====
The Plus Six consists of members of Class 13 involved in the Flask Plan, whose Abnormalities are far more advanced than the other members of Class 13. While they were brought together as the original foundation for the Flask Plan, Naze notes that their inherent attitudes mean that they have little interest in actually furthering the plan's completion. However, they elect to help stall the Student Council and their allies to stall for time during Oudo and Naze's plan to brainwash Medaka.

Gunki Itoshima (糸島 軍規, Itoshima Gunki)
Project name: Death Watch (死番虫, Desu Wacchi)
Voiced by: Takuya Satō
A seemingly hotheaded boy who declares that he is not so cowardly to leave a friend in need. Unzen remarks that Itoshima, along with Hyakuchou, is particularly exceptional among the Plus Six and not the type that should be challenged lightly. Because of their implied strength, it is suggested that either Itoshima or Hyakuchou is the leader of the Plus Six.
Otome Yunomae (湯前 音眼, Yunomae Otome)
Project name: Free World (宙ぶらりん, Furī Wārudo)
An apathetic girl who speaks in monotone, chews bubblegum, and only wears a pair of overalls. Her abnormality appears to allow others to pierce into her body without harming her.
Hamaya Hyakuchou (百町 破魔矢, Hyakuchou Hamaya)
Project name: Love (初恋, Rabu)
A member of the Plus Six who openly admits to having no interest in the abilities of Medaka Kurokami, but agrees to aid Naze and Oudo so that Oudo will have to return the favor someday. Unzen notes that Hyakuchou and Itoshima are exceptional members of the Plus Six and cautions against making the first move against them. Hyakuchou's abilities seem to be related to using an archery bow.
Yutori Chikuzen (筑前 優鳥, Chikuzen Yutori)
Project name: Trick or Treatment (髪々の黄昏, Torikku Oa Torītomento)
A girl with long hair that conceals her face; her hair is capable of growing at will and binding a number of opponents extremely quickly. She speaks with a Kansai accent.
Yamami Tsurumisaki (鶴御崎 山海, Tsurumisaki Yamami)
Project name: Star Master (占領役者, Sutā Masutā)
A boy with a strange mark on his face and speaks in an equally strange manner. He feels disgusted being near normals and would think nothing but of getting rid of them. He is capable of melting iron with his fingers.
Shoko Kamimine (上峰 書子, Kamimine Shoko)
Project name: Dental Shoes (食虫食物, Dentaru Shūzu)
A bookish looking girl who is capable of stopping a barrage of bullets with her teeth. She regards normals, or ordinary people, as trash.

=== Class -13 ===
Once the Flask Plan was destroyed, the Headmaster put his own personal version of the Flask Plan into action. Selecting students with negative outlooks and corresponding abnormalities, Class -13 was born. The class consists entirely of Minuses: detached, traumatised, resigned, or pessimistic people, who can develop emotionally shallow attachments to anything or anybody that makes them feel a little better. More unusually and specifically, they actually seem to enjoy being that way, hence are usually smiling and appear to have masochistic tendencies. Centered around Misogi Kumagawa, their stated aim is to create an entirely equal society where nobody would possess any distinguishing special abilities, though they lack any sort of direction as to how to achieve the goal. Though most members seem borderline homicidal and willing to use underhanded means, they are actually mostly good-hearted individuals.

==== Hansode Shiranui ====
Hansode Shiranui (不知火 半袖, Shiranui Hansode)
Minus Name: Real Eater (正喰者, Riaru Ītā)
Voiced by: Emiri Katō (Japanese); Hilary Haag (English)
The comic relief character of the series, the granddaughter of the Headmaster of Hakoniwa Academy. Zenkichi regards her as his best friend; he is apparently the only person who can get along with her and somewhat control her. Even though she is the smallest of the main characters, Shiranui has a very large appetite and is constantly seen eating. She has a knack for finding clandestine information with ease, knowing about most things that would seem to be vague details, and is unusually perceptive. Normally, she is a very cheerful girl, but she is shown to have a dark side and is brutally tactless. Shiranui harbors a hidden resentment against Medaka and claims she has no friends and, unlike the other abnormals, does not desire them. Because of the antagonism that exists between them, Medaka initially asks Shiranui to become the Vice President of the Student Council, though Shiranui refuses.
While she prefers to remaining on the sidelines observing and is extraordinarily capable of removing herself from any danger, Shiranui elects to join Class -13 after encountering Kumagawa. Her decision is partially motivated by her desire to test her friendship with Zenkichi, who unexpectedly responds by worrying about her safety without questioning their friendship. Despite her claims to not care for anyone nor having any friends, it seems that she has deep feelings for Zenkichi. Her ability is "Real-Eater;" this skill allows her to take another person's skill and 'eat' it, modifying the skill to have a different ability. During the battle against Class-0, she changed Hinokage's skill from "Mister Unknown" to the speed-based abnormality "Theme Song"; similarly, Shiranui modifies Zenkichi's "Parasite Eyes" to "Model Zenkichi", allowing Zenkichi's ability to see what his opponent sees to become a skill that allows him to see limitations instead. Her grandfather originally saw her as the base for Class -13, suggesting that she has abilities on par with those of Kumagawa, and he himself recognizes the similarities between them. She was also able to come out of attacks by both Shibuki Shibushi and Gagamaru Chougasaki unscathed.
After the ending of the Jet Black Wedding Feast, it is revealed that Hansode's true mission was to act as Medaka's "double", watching her from the shadows. With Medaka able to live her life by herself, Hansode's mission is completed, and she requests that Kumagawa use his All Fiction skill to erase all memories relating to her from all the Hakoniwa students before she leaves for good. However, Medaka, Zenkichi, Anshin'in, and Kumagawa remember her and elect to bring her back from the Shiranui Village, unfortunately learning that Hansode is the intended vessel for Iihiko Shishime.

==== Others ====
Mukae Emukae (江迎 怒江, Emukae Mukae)
Minus Name: Rough Rafflesia (荒廃した腐花, Rafu Rafureshia)
A transfer student to Hakoniwa Academy, whose ability "Raff-Rafflesia" causes all matter that comes into contact with her hands to decompose and corrode, including air. Since it automatically destroyed the things that she loved, including any pets, Emukae became very desperate for affection, gained limited understanding of human relationships, and can become clingy and jealous if a nice guy shows her kindness. As a result, her first encounter with Zenkichi results in her developing an obsession with him that she interprets as love simply because he offered his hand to help her up. After fighting Hitomi Hitoyoshi and corroding almost an entire building to escape, Kumagawa shows that her ability is not dangerous for him, and changes its nature so that it can also be used to cultivate plants, and the two become friends. After she is defeated by Zenkichi during the Treasurer's battle, his words encouraging her to use her new plant abilities for more beneficial purposes this results in her feelings for him re-igniting into a more harmless crush, which grows overtime. She is also known to fight with two knives, holding them underhand and gripping the blades, causing her hands to bleed heavily. When Zenkichi becomes the Student Council President, Emukae is appointed to become his treasurer. During the fight with Kururugi, she confesses her love to Zenkichi but does so when she believes she is about to die. Kumagawa arrives to save her and allows her to fully confess to Zenkichi, who nearly commits Seppuku for having not noticed her feelings all this time. Although she is rejected by him, she is happy that she can still love him.
Gagamaru Chougasaki (蝶ヶ崎 蛾々丸, Chougasaki Gagamaru)
Minus Name: Encounter (不慮の事故, Enkauntā)
A member of Class -13 who works together with Shibuki to stop Kumagawa from continuing his fight against Hinokage, Gagamaru is a junior-level student with the ability "Encounter", which allows him to push away all damage inflicted on him, including all physical, emotional, and mental damage, elsewhere, granting him near absolute invulnerability, but also shutting him off from all worthwhile experience, and making his life empty. Due to the nature of his Minus, he is always composed and rational-minded. However, because of the mindset he has developed by not allowing himself to experience emotional damage, any insult he allows to affect him will launch him into a furious rage. He wears an elegant suit and a monocle and is well-informed of the events that ended the Flask Plan and recognizes who Hinokage is. He faces Hinokage in the Vice President's battle and despite Hinokage's power, he only loses on a technicality due to sheer apathy, as his opponent is not able to hurt him in the slightest.
Shibuki Shibushi (志布志 飛沫, Shibushi Shibuki)
Minus Name: Scar Dead (致死武器, Sukā Deddo)
A member of Class -13 who works with Gagamaru to stop Kumagawa from continuing his fight against Hinokage, a girl who resembles a yanki. A freshman transfer student who enjoys fighting, she dresses in a torn and low-cut school uniform, and is one of the executive members of Class -13. Her ability is known as "Scar Dead" which allows her to re-open any wound, no matter how old. This ability extends to mental and emotional scars as well as physical wounds. Hitomi Hitoyoshi reveals that Shibuki and Gagamaru were strong enough to destroy the facility she once worked at when they were children, and their power is likely the reason why Kumagawa's plans have been successful. Shibuki has been with Gagamaru since they were five years old, though she states their friendship has been based on her desire not to die.

=== Committee students ===
Hakoniwa Academy's various student activities and services are run by committees, which includes the Student Council. The majority of the chairmen of the various committees at Hakoniwa Academy are introduced as the opponents that the potential successors and the Student Council must overcome during Medaka's treasure hunt. As the Chairman of the Enforcers, Myouri Unzen is also an opponent, who sets up a chess match: "Four Continuous Showdowns on the Boards: Casting Boat". The match is simultaneous to the challenge set up by Kiruko Tachiarai, the Chairman of the Election Management Division. The executives of the Student Committees are later challenged and manage to defeat Kumagawa's "Naked Apron Alliance" that was composed to counter the opposing factions of Zenkichi and Medaka preceding the 100th election for Student Council President.

==== Public Morals Committee ====
This committee is a group of students who are charged with enforcing school rules and regulations, viewing themselves as the upholders of justice. They are generally referred to as the Enforcers and consider themselves in opposition to the Student Council, and that they are not above the laws of the school. They are led by the charismatic Myouri Unzen and generally will not hesitate to carry out his orders, regardless of how ruthless they might be.

Harigane Onigase (鬼瀬 針音, Onigase Harigane)
Voiced by: Ayuru Ōhashi (Japanese); Luci Christian (English)
Harigane is an eager member of the Enforcers, known as "American Cuff Onigase" for her use of handcuffs to apprehend students who have broken school rules. Displeased with the Student Council's flouting of the school's uniform regulations, her efforts to enforce them begins the conflict between the Student Council and the Enforcers. Though she is somewhat zealous and has a strong sense of justice, she does recognize the positive effect of the Student Council.
Fue Yobuko (呼子 笛, Yobuko Fue)
Voiced by: Ami Koshimizu (Japanese); Elizabeth Bunch (English)
The deputy head enforcer, Yobuko is a calm and collected young woman who favours the use of heavy chains and hanging students who have broken school rules. She is extremely loyal to Myouri Unzen and even seems to dote on him sometimes.

==== Election Management Committee ====
The Election Management Committee consist of students charged with ensuring the fair elections for the governing body of the academy. Members of the committee are dedicated working within the shadows of the Student Council and the Enforcers and avoid unnecessary attention in order to be forgotten so to maintain their impartiality in regard to school affairs. Committee members are also known for concealing their eyes behind masks.

Tokemichi Choujabaru (長者原 融通, Choujabaru Tokemichi)
A second-year student of Class 13, Choujabaru is the vice-chairman of the Election Management Division. As the characters of his name suggest, he is a person who follows rules strictly and does not yield to pressure, making him perfectly fair and impossibly impartial. Likely because of his rule-abiding nature, he is Unzen's only male friend. As a member of the Election Management Division, he previously presided over Medaka's election as the 98th Student Council President and appears to preside over the Kumagawa's challenge to overturn Medaka's election. He is capable of stopping Kumagawa's attacks, indicating Choujabaru's qualifications to judge the challenge.
Kiruko Tachiarai (大刀洗 斬子, Tachiarai Kiruko)
As the Chairman of the Election Management Committee, Tachiarai is a second-year student in Class 1 and Tokemichi Choujabaru's immediate superior. She is infamous for being the chairman who takes the least amount of action and works the least in Hakoniwa Academy's history. She is known for sleeping twenty-two hours a day, lying constantly on a large pillow while wearing an eye-mask inscribed with "I cannot work." Despite her laziness, she is considered an eccentric and easy-going genius, but difficult to categorize. Her challenge, "Vote the Unpopular: the Friendship Break-up Election", forces students to overcome the challenge of ostracism such that all members of the team can advance, but they cannot consult one another during the election process. She is later revealed to be quite fond or very affectionate towards Kumagawa, given that she was the only one who claimed ownership of him after the Bloody Seven game when no one else wanted him.

==== Other committee executives ====
Yabumi Juunichou (十二町 矢文, Juunichou Yabumi)
The beautiful Chairman of the Library Committee, Yabumi is the opponent for the second trial of Medaka's treasure hunt. Known as the "Mobile Library", she has the incredible capacity to remember the entire contents of all books she has ever read and quote them as she feels is suitable. Her challenge to the successors and the Student Council is the "Reverse Sphinx" – her challengers must create a theme quiz based on any book of their choosing. To win the challenge, they must ask her a question she cannot answer, though for each question Yabumi answers, the challenger must surrender an item in their possession.
Aoki Aka (赤 青黄, Aka Aoki)
Aka is the Chairman of the Health Preservation Committee, a second-year student in Class 11 who presents one of the two fourth trials available in the treasure hunt, which she has named the "Palace of Pain: the Perfect Melancholy." Unlike the other chairmen, she is a Not-Equal like the potential successors and has been given one of Ajimu's trillion skills, the "Five Forks", which allows her to afflict and cure any ailment she wishes upon an opponent, by scratching them with the claws on her right hand. However, Ajimu warns her that the skill is utterly useless against Kumagawa and cautions her against challenging him. In her challenge, opponents are required to play a game of Concentration with two decks of playing cards; opponents must match both suit and number to accumulate as many points as possible, with aces possessing the most value and twos having the least. The defeated opponent will be afflicted with an ailment from Aka. Though the game appears to rely on memory, it becomes apparent that Aka cheats by switching cards, though Kumagawa manages to force her to concede using tricks of his own.
Kuroudo Iizuka (飯塚 食人, Iizuka Kuroudo) and Konomi Mera (米良 孤呑, Mera Konomi)
The Co-Chairmen of the Diet Education Committee are two second-year students in Class 12. "Cook Hunter" Iizuka is a tall boy who carries a hunter's rifle, and "Chef" Mera is a girl who carries an extremely large serrated knife. They refer to one another as "Roudo" and "Merari". Roudo, as a hunter, is incredibly adept at tracking down prey based on sound, and he uses his abnormal breathing developed from his gluttony to cancel sounds, such as those emitted by Kikaijima's echolocation, to let him remain undetected. Merari is known as a chef among chefs and trained as a cook in Italy. She believes strongly in the creed that to live is to eat, and to eat is to kill. For the fifth trial, the "Super Cooking Practice", they challenge their opponents to prepare a meal that Merari will consider delicious, providing a vast wall of the finest ingredients to use as the challengers wish.
Tsue Kamimutsuro (上無津呂 杖, Kamimutsuro Tsue)
The Chairman of the Exercise Committee, Kamimutsuro is a female second-year student in Class 11, who is also the president of the karate club. Her talents include communicating with animals and ventriloquism, and she is known as Medaka's brawling partner. She is one of the few people with enough incredible strength not to collapse after trading punches with Medaka. Kamimutsuro has a great deal of respect for martial arts as a sport, rather than as a form of violence, and will not allow competitors to be injured. Her challenge to Akune and Wanizuka, is named "Cats and Dogs". The goal is to fight a martial-arts match in a cage where only the winner of the match may proceed, after she tricks them into capturing all the cats in her room.
Uzume Megusuno (廻栖野 うずめ, Megusuno Uzume)
The Chairman of the Beautification Committee, Uzume is the guardian of the last trial of Medaka's treasure hunt, a female second-year student in Class 10. While many at Hakoniwa Academy have been called monsters, Megusuno alone is called a "witch" and dresses as such, wearing a large jack o'lantern to conceal her face, a witch's hat, and carrying a broom around. Like Tsugiha, she possesses an overwhelmingly powerful imagination and ability to think her way out of any fantastic situation, though her grip on reality is considerably much more solid than Tsugiha. Her challenge is called "Magical Adventure: Magical Beast Extermination". It requires her opponents to "defeat an enemy they cannot see" by use of their ability to out-think her and force her to concede defeat in a scenario she has created. In her subsequent appearances, she continues to wear her enormous witch's hat, but has otherwise been revealed to be a girl with long fair hair and a deadpan expression.

=== Other students ===
Nekomi Nabeshima (鍋島 猫美, Nabeshima Nekomi)
Voiced by: Minako Kotobuki (Japanese); Monica Rial (English)
A third-year student, Nabeshima is introduced in the series as the retiring captain of the judo team. Because she does not hesitate to cheat outside of official matches, Nabeshima is known as the "Queen of Fouls (反則王, Hansoku Ō)" in judo.^{Ch. 5} She despises natural geniuses, such as Akune, and has an interest in Zenkichi, wanting him to join the judo club and succeed her as the team's captain.^{Ch. 5} While her devised plot fails to rid the judo club of Akune and simultaneously have Zenkichi join the judo club, she still arranges for Medaka to accept Akune as the secretary of the Student Council^{Ch. 6} and continues to express an interest in Zenkichi. While she does not like admitting it, Nabeshima recognizes that she and Medaka are friends. She has a tendency to avoid situations where she could lose or get badly hurt, so she is regarded as a coward, and is rarely fazed after situations where others are emotionally and mentally scarred. In the final chapter, Nabeshima is revealed to have won Olympic gold in Judo, but was forced to retire due to a foot injury she sustained during the match; Zenkichi then points out the irony that Nabeshima, a normal, was the only member of their class to have become the best in the world at something.
Umumichi Yakushima (屋久島 有無路, Yakushima Umumichi)
Voiced by: Makoto Yasumura (Japanese); David Matranga (English)
The captain of the Swim Team, a third-year student. As a swimmer, he is skilled in all areas of swimming, regardless of distance or style. He regards his teammates, Tanegashima and Kikaijima, as family, and neither Yakushima nor Tanegashima would hesitate to do anything to protect Kikaijima. The three are obsessed with obtaining money, believing it is the most important thing of all; Yakushima's obsession comes from how his family split up due to not having money. He is also a classmate of Nabeshima.
Sotsu Tanegashima (種子島 率, Tanegashima Sotsu)
Voiced by: Hiroyuki Yoshino (Japanese); Dylan Godwin (English)
The vice-captain of the Swim Team, Tanegashima is a second-year student. Like Yakushima and Kikaijima, he is obsessed with obtaining money and believes it is more important than anything else. His obsession stems from the orphanage that he had lived in being shut down due to lack of funding and financial assistance. However, he and his fellow Swim Club members regard each other like family. A skilled swimmer, he is likely one of the fastest swimmers in the world.
Myouga Unzen (雲仙 冥加, Unzen Myouga)
Voiced by: Mariya Ise (Japanese); Carli Mosier (English)
Myouga is Myouri's older sister, an odd girl who does not speak in any known language; instead she invented her own language of numbers that only Medaka and her brother Myouri can understand. Much like her brother, she has a perverted personality; she likes telling jokes about breasts. Myouga is introduced immediately after Myouri Unzen was defeated, hoping to defeat Medaka so that she could steal her place in Class 13. She would have been successful as well if Nekomi Nabeshima had not stepped in. Her weapons of choice are six massive iron balls (each weighing 30 kg or 66 lbs) attached to chains. In her fight with Nabeshima, she ditches these heavy balls and gains an incredible speed boost. Unfortunately for her, that speed boost was not enough to defeat the "Queen of Fouls".
Kuudou Hinokage (日之影 空洞, Hinokage Kuudou)
Hinokage is the 96th and 97th Student Council President of Hakoniwa Academy and Medaka's immediate predecessor, who recommended Medaka as his successor as Student Council President. He is a friendly and jovial senior student at Hakoniwa Academy, who has retired from the Student Council. He is regarded as a hero by Medaka and Zenkichi, and Shiranui remarks that he is strong enough to take on an entire army on his own. His power is that almost no student can recall meeting him, thus not allowing him to even be called "Mr. Unknown", and nobody can even recognize his existence, including Medaka. Because of his extremely reclusive nature, he was able to protect the school for an entire year by himself, but was so overwhelmingly and abnormally strong, people were inclined to look away from him and forget his existence. When Medaka approaches him to aid the Student Council against Misogi, he refuses to work with her, but instead, he challenges Misogi on his own in order to protect the school he loves. Though he is initially able to hold his own, he realizes the true extent of Misogi's depravity and yields to Medaka's request when he learns that others like Misogi exist. When he is soundly defeated by Chougasaki and Shibushi, he allows Shiranui to replace his "Mr. Unknown" abnormality with "Theme Song", an ability that allows him to move at alarming speeds and attack with incredible force reminiscent of Medaka's Kurokami Phantom technique. The ability also openly allows his overwhelming strength and nature to be recognized by his peers. This gives him the encouragement and confidence he needs to defeat Chougasaki in the Vice-President's battle.
Kamome Tsurubami (鶴喰 鴎, Tsurubami Kamome)
Known as the "Lonely Birthday (ひとりぼっちの誕生日, Hitoribocchi no Tanjoubi)", Tsurubami is Medaka's maternal cousin, who was found by Ajimu when searching for people very similar to Medaka, due to getting him interested by telling him that Medaka killed his missing father. He is told to become Zenkichi's friend in her campaign to have Zenkichi usurp Medaka as the main character by having Zenkichi directly defeat Medaka. A young man with a dark presence and shadows over his eyes, he is described as the ultimate "dark hero", due to being both detached, shy, gloomy, confused, and socially incompetent, but also simultaneously having good intentions, being self-sacrificing, honest, persistent, observant, and giving support from the sidelines. He appears to be obsessed with Jump Square and why it is superior to Shonen Jump, and generally carries on about topics, despite the fact that he appears to be the only one actually invested in any of his conversations. Ajimu mentions that he is the sort who can only handle one conversation partner at a time.
Tsurubami uses a three-part fighting style, as he has been stated to be able to use both an abnormal skill that allows him to control the rotation of the world with the help of his spinning top, a minus skill that allows him to block other people's attacks, and his self-created style "Provocations User". This has properties in language manipulation, which allows him to snatch away his opponents' composure.
After Medaka attacked him for babbling too much, he initially managed to score a win, but lost when she shut off her hearing to stop listening to him, and went with uncomplicated brute force instead. However, he did not carry a grudge, and apparently mostly ignores beatings. Unlike the other style-users, his ability is entirely self-taught and was developed during his search for his missing father. Hence, his narrative style is known as "Prototype", due to some measure of originality.
It is later revealed that Tsurubami's father, Dr. Fukuro Tsurubami, was a suitor for Medaka's hand in the first Jet Black Wedding Feast, and was the eventual victor but was killed before the engagement. Because his relationship to Medaka was more paternal than that of a fiance, Medaka regarded Dr. Tsurubami as father to her and adopts Kamome as a brother. However, when the associate families to the Kurokami family insist on another Jet Black Wedding Feast, Kamome is chosen as a participant for the Tsurubami family.
Kudaki Torai (虎居 砕, Torai Kudaki)
A second-year student in Class 10, Torai is Zenkichi's General Affairs Manager during his presidency. Very strict and business-orientated, she brushes aside the prospect of six missing students in favor of matters more immediately relevant to the academy and is easily flustered when it appears Zenkichi might ignore his duties as Student Council President in favor of rescuing the six troublemakers. Torai seems to care greatly for hierarchy, insisting that Zenkichi drop the formalities when speaking with her, as he is her superior. Despite possessing the least experience and seniority on the Student Council, Zenkichi states she is the strongest member of his group and that she is the First Generation human being to have undergone the completed Flask Plan.

=== Potential Successors ===
After Ajimu makes herself known to Zenkichi and the Student Council, Medaka organizes an attempt to find successors who will be able to continue to stop Ajimu from succeeding at completing the Flask Plan after Medaka and the current Student Council graduate. However, among the many middle school students who appear upon Medaka's summons, only five remain standing when Kumagawa brutally and bluntly disheartens them with his words. However, unbeknown to the Student Council, the five are actually detachments of Ajimu and are completely normal girls, much like Zenkichi was a normal boy.

Kiki Kikitsu (喜々津 嬉々, Kikitsu Kiki)
A senior from Kanoke Junior High who constantly wears goggles and headphones and plays a video game, Kiki is energetic and does not appear to worry about anything. While she shows talent in a wide variety of activities, there is little coherence in any of them. She does not have any genuine interest or passion in anything she participates, but challenges anything she believes is difficult until she becomes bored of it.
Shori Wanizuka (鰐塚 処理, Wanizuka Shori)
A senior from Sensuikan Junior High, a serious girl who wears an eyepatch over her left eye and often takes a leadership role amongst the successors. She is an expert with firearms. She became interested in Medaka's offer as a means of self-improvement and appears to resent the fact that Akune, who was once known as the Destroyer because he had been incredibly strong, appears to have gone soft. However, when she realizes that Akune is still as strong as ever, her resentment quickly becomes admiration and devotion. Wanizuka is later revealed to be Koi Munakata (宗像恋, Munakata Koi), the younger sister of Kei Munakata, who presumed his sister disappeared as an act of rebellion and notes her tendency for failing to recognize social situations quite often; her eyepatch conceals the eye she destroyed in order to remove her own abnormality. While the other successors return to their respective junior high schools after the Student Council elections, Wanizuka remains at Hakoniwa to serve as Zenkichi's Secretary on the Student Council.
Ima Takarabe (財部 依真, Takarabe Ima)
A senior from Hitomasu All-Girls Junior High, a cute girl with spectacles who smiles all the time. While she appears exceptionally polite and cheerful, she is actually extremely insincere and rude (expressed with strikethrough text). Kumagawa was able to see through her facade easily and after defeating her, along with the other candidates when they attacked him, she appears to have developed some feelings for him.
Tsugiha Yojirou (与次郎 次葉, Yojirou Tsugiha)
A senior from Kanetsume Junior High, a sweet and relatively normal looking girl. However, Tsugiha is utterly convinced that she is a magical girl known as "Magical Girl Wonder Tsugiha" and will go into delusions of her life interacting with figments of her imagination until she calms down. As such, she views the entire world as a scenario, like in a roleplaying game, and interprets ordinary circumstances in as extraordinary a way as possible. She considers the use of a taser and sulfuric acid as magical items.
Suishou Kibougaoka (希望が丘 水晶, Kibougaoka Suishou)
A senior from St. Cargo All-Girls Academy, who claims to be a prototype automaton in the form of a girl. She speaks mechanically and believes that attending Hakoniwa will allow her to gather data on what having a heart is like. Though she is an automaton with extensive knowledge of much of the world, she is extremely considerate and appears to genuinely wish for others to be happy. Kibougaoka is capable of flight and martial arts.

== Kurokami Group ==
=== Jet Black Wedding Feast ===
Following Zenkichi's successful election as the 100th Student Council President of Hakoniwa Academy, Medaka is forced to deal with the suitors from seven branch families to the Kurokami family. Her original fiancé was decided in a battle between the seven suitors known as the Jet Black Wedding Feast; the eventual victor was Fukurou Tsurubami (鶴喰 梟, Tsurubami Fukurou), the father of Kamome Tsurubami. However, he was killed afterward before the marriage and the organization behind the Jet Black Wedding Feast intended to wait until Medaka had finished her work as the Student Council President before arranging another feast. When Kamome is invited as the suitor from the Tsurubami family, Medaka elects to take his place so she can decide for herself who she will marry.

Bukiko Udou (兎洞 武器子, Udou Bukiko)
A diminutive girl in a bunny costume and wielding a yari, she is a representative of Gekkabyoujin-kai (月下氷人会, Gekkabyoujin-kai), the organization that set up the first Jet Black Wedding Feast (漆黒宴, Shikkokuen) to determine Medaka's fiance. When the winner, Dr. Fukuro Tsurubami, was murdered, the results were inconclusive, so she reappears at Hakoniwa to announce the second feast. Her role in the feast, along with the other members of the Gekkabyoujin-kai, is to ensure that no participants take inappropriate actions against one another. However, she seems to fear Zenkichi's effect on Medaka more than anything else, thus she attempts to move the Jet Black Wedding Feast to increasingly difficult to reach locations to ensure Zenkichi cannot interfere.
The Proxy Suitors
At the beginning of the Jet Black Wedding Feast, Medaka and her companions are introduced to six suitors. Kumagawa notes that because all the suitors are distantly related to one another, all of them have some kind of sexual oddity, including Medaka who likes to reveal her body, and Tsurubami who finds women's shoes one of their attractive features and all hint towards an aspect of the true suitor they are standing in for. They are all easily crushed by Ajimu with only six hundred of her talents. However, they are then revealed to be fakes, and that the real suitors are all women who sent the men as proxies because they all slept in. Each of the six proxy suitors have names which allude to them not being the real suitors. They are all later revealed to be associates of the Shiranui clan, whose role is to shadow the members of the Kurokami family and its branch families. The proxy suitors included the following characters.
- Kairai Kugurugi (潜木 怪儡, Kugurugi Kairai), a young man with a forelock and long braid with a masochistic perversion, that causes him to enjoy being stepped on by women. He seems to view being called a pervert as a compliment from Medaka. While he wields a sword during the Jet Black Wedding, he later reveals his true specialty is using fire-arms; he also appears to be able to conceal himself by lying flat on the ground. His name, 怪儡 (Kairai) comes from 傀儡, meaning "Puppet".
- Shinkirou Kotobuki (寿 蜃気郎, Kotobuki Shinkirou), a tall strong young boxer or wrestler clad in spandex clothes, who has a paedophilic perversion. He describes his favourite type of girl as being eight years old, and comments that he's sure that Medaka will give birth to a wonderful daughter. His name, 蜃気郎 (Shinkirou) comes from 蜃気楼, meaning "Mirage".
- Genjitsu Momozono (桃園 幻実, Momozono Genjitsu), a boy who only likes two-dimensional drawings, and not real women. Possibly using some form of elemental power, or energy projection. His name, 幻実 (Genjitsu), contains 幻, which can mean "Illusion".
- Sakugo Nienami (贄波 錯悟, Nienami Sakugo), an anxious looking boy with a perversion for gore, horror, and girls covered in blood. Possibly psychic, given that Najimi at least partially focused on completely outclassing (in some cases to the point of extensively torturing) all of them in their own areas. His name, 錯悟 (Sakugo) comes from 錯誤, meaning "Mistake".
- Kariteru Kanaino (叶野 仮輝, Kanaino Kariteru), a serious and scholarly looking bespectacled young man. Compared to the others he only seems to have a small fetish for girls wearing glasses. Possibly capable of some form of transformation. His name, 仮輝 (Kariteru), contains 仮, which means "Temporary".
- Gizou Yuzuriha (杠 偽造, Yuzuriha Gizou), a strange young man with long white hair that flies wildly around him. His most distinctive trait is that his body is completely black, allegedly entirely made of dark matter, which obscures all his facial features except his mouth. He has a perverse fetish for girls' panties, and seems to like strange puns. His name, 偽造 (Gizou), can mean "Forgery".
The True Suitors
The six actual representatives of the six Kurokami branch families consist of six girls. Though they are all female, the issue is regarded mostly as a minor detail compared to right to marry Medaka, and obtain the blood of her parents through Medaka, by defeating her at the Jet Black Wedding Feast. Though they are supposed to act according to the regulations set by the Gekkabyoujin-kai, they fully intend to demonstrate how strong they really are when Kumagawa remarks that they didn't care enough to participate Jet Black Wedding Feast in the first place. Like Kamome Tsurubami, they are "Style Users", abilities that manipulate the meaning of language.
- Namanie Nienami (贄波 生煮, Nienami Namanie), Medaka's fifth suitor, a disheveled looking girl who wears tattered sailor fuku uniform and wields a blade sharp enough to cut battleships and helicopters. She specializes in a style of swordfighting called "Inkendo Mugenbai" and she can wield as many as seven swords by embedding them into her arms. Though she can endure extremely sharp pain, Nienami is defeated when Zenkichi utilizes her weakness, hypersensitivity to very dull pain, against her. Being the first of the suitors to be defeated, she agrees to lead Zenkichi and the Student Council to the second destination of the Jet Black Wedding Feast. Her style is known as "Contradictory Conjunction User", which allows her to make impossibilities occur based on the idea that if something is "X", therefore she should be able to make the least possible outcome happen. She is prone to socially bizarre attempts to be amusing, which aren't actually very funny to others at all. Because of her indifference towards the world, Dr. Tsurubami deliberately taught her the most powerful style he had developed as he knew her half-hearted nature would limit the ability from causing chaos.
- Sui Kanaino (叶野 遂, Kanaino Sui), Medaka's sixth suitor, a bespectacled beauty who wields a kama with her mouth and has the power to manipulate and manifest the meaning of kanji characters. Her style is called "Kanji User". However, her powers can only work when she is on all fours and cannot apply to words that use katakana. When she attempts to stop the Student Council from reaching the South Pole on a jet, she is defeated by Naze, who forces Kanaino to stand by manipulating the temperature of gasoline (which is a loan word usually written in katakana), though at the cost of leaving the jet plane to make a crash landing.
- Mogura Kugurugi (潜木 もぐら, Kugurugi Mogura), Medaka's first, and allegedly strongest, suitor, a "Misconversion User" who specialises in disassembly, and can cause "translation errors" from homophones and poor translations to gain tangible effects. She is exceedingly confident in herself, and despises lukewarm attitudes. Aware that something that is wrong from the beginning, such as Emukae's Raff-Rafflesia, cannot be undone by All Fiction, Kumagawa rightly concludes that Kugurugi has the same limitation, and when she attempts to mistranslate "mistake" as "apology", he states that he was not mistaken about his attack nor willing to forgive her for hurting Emukae. As a result, Kugurugi is defeated in a single blow by Kumagawa's Book Maker, which he guarantees is strong enough to seal Kugurugi's abilities for at least thirty years.
- Momo Momozono (桃園 喪々, Momozono Momo), a tiny girl resembling a kindergarten student who possesses an aggressive attitude and has large dark bags under her eyes. Her style is known as "Label User", which allows her to seal away people into cards, preventing anyone from accessing a trapped person's physical form, though those sealed away may be able to eventually escape on their own. Momozono is an expert at psychological warfare, being particularly adept at limiting her opponent's ability to communicate, including by omitting information. Momozono and the remaining two suitors challenge Medaka to a game of delete shiritori, with the winner taking the Momozono's hostages and Medaka's hand in marriage. Medaka successfully outmaneuvers Monozono, the final challenger, forcing Monozono's last words in the game to be "surrender", after manipulating the conversations of everyone present during the several-hour-long delete shiratori game.
- Joutou Kotobuki (寿 常套, Kotobuki Joutou), a young woman who dresses suggestively and speaks with a lisp, one of Medaka's three final suitors. She is eliminated along with Yuzuriha in the early rounds of the delete shiritori game by Momo. Kotobuki and Yuzuriha later appear under the employ of Dr. Tsurubami, being the only two aware of Dr. Tsurubami's true plans. Kotobuki's style is known as "Nursery Rhyme User", allowing her to make her opponents physically regress to a younger age by singing nursery rhymes and lullabies; the ability can be used to restore a person to an earlier physical state and even back to life, even if they have been killed by at the hands of Iihiko. However, the effects of "Nursery Rhyme" are limited to the range in which Kotobuki can transmit her songs and wear off if Kotobuki is unconscious or dead. She does not hesitate to use infants as a shield, though Medaka manages to defeat Kotobuki by developing her own sense of musical rhythm to outmaneuver Kotobuki and avoid the effects of Kotobuki's songs.
- Kakegae Yuzuriha (杠 かけがえ, Yuzuriha Kakegae), a young lady who wears an elegant ball gown and resembles a princess, one of Medaka's three final suitors. She and Kotobuki are eliminated early in the delete shiritori game as a result of Momo's machinations to limit Medaka in the challenge. She and Kotobuki are later revealed to be the only two fully aware of Fukurou Tsurubami's plans for instigating the Jet Black Wedding Feast. In contrast to the other style users, Kakegae possesses two styles. The first style is known as the "Eight Hundred Lies User", which allows herself to physically multiply exponentially for each lie she adds to a previously told lie – as a result, she can turn 800 copies of herself into 640 000 (from 800 x 800) copies. Each replica is not a shadow clone, but another physical version of Kakegae, which means that each one must be defeated in order to beat Kakegae. Kakegae's second style, "Metonymy User", allows her to replace herself with the attributes of another person, similar to how a concept is referred to by the name of something associated with the concept. She uses the ability to imitate Nienami and use her "Contradictory-Conjunction" style in order to delay Iihiko long enough for Nienami to transfer her ability to Zenkichi.

=== Shiranui Village ===
Founded at the spot where Hanten Shiranui first appeared, members of the Shiranui Village are dedicated to preserving the existences of rare and unusual natures through their ability to become the shadow of another person. They primarily serve the Kurokami Group.

Obi (帯)
The leader of the Shiranui house, which serves as the shadows of Kurokami clan and has authority over a hidden village built on the site where Hanten Shiranui appeared. Her true name is Hanhaba Shiranui (不知火 半幅, Shiranui Hanhaba). Obi herself is a diminutive woman with great cunning and composure, and is highly respectful of the Kurokami group. Dedicated to her duties, she congratulates Hansode for completing her work as Medaka's shadow. She is brutally hurt when Iihiko Shishime is freed, but she survives the attack and later sends Hansode to become the shadow of Fukurou Tsurubami.
Iihiko Shishime (獅子目 言彦, Shishime Iihiko)
An enormous, tyrannical man formerly sealed within the Shiranui Village, Iihiko is the first being that Najimi Ajimu could not defeat. In truth, the original Iihiko had been an unusual existence whose abilities allowed him to be regarded as a hero among the common people and the Shiranui village has sought to preserve his existence by providing him new vessels through their ability to become the shadow of another existence. After failing to defeat him 100,000 times in a row 5000 years ago, Anshin'in resolved the best course of action was to avoid him entirely. Brutal and arrogant, he denounces Anshin'in's search for an impossibility as boring and has a tendency to describe things as "fresh." Even with all her skills, Anshin'in is quickly defeated by Iihiko, who proceeds to appear before Medaka and Hansode. He develops an interest in Medaka because of her decision to fight him despite overwhelming odds, believing that Anshin'in's decision to defend Medaka was well-founded. Iihiko is strangely compassionate towards Hansode Shiranui, apparently because her body is to become his next host. However, if Hansode leaves the Shiranui village with any other intent other than to become the shadow of another person, the village's hold on Iihiko proves insufficient to contain him and he will destroy anything that stands between him and his next host.
Though Iihiko's abilities are far less versatile than Ajimu's, he has even greater raw power and higher-dimensional stature, to the extent that even Ajimu's most powerful practically omnipotent skills aren't even noticed by him, and Medaka would be overloaded and destroyed from attempting to copy him. Also, his ability to permanently inflict damage on whatever he attacks, prevents a person to naturally heal from their wounds, which also allows him, for example to bypass Medaka's healing abilities or kill Anshin'in, who is immortal. The only thing that is allegedly able to affect him is psychological manipulation, hence "style users". Iihiko is referred to as a literal "living legend", carried on through the ages by the Shiranui. He successfully possessed Hansode after apparently being defeated by Medaka and almost succeeds in killing Medaka and everyone else present, only to be faced by Zenkichi, who defeats Iihiko by reaching Hansode within her body, causing her to turn Iihiko's own "permanent damage" ability back on him and kill him. Afterwards, Iihiko's "ghost" appears for the final arc, representing the heroic version of himself from many years ago. He is defeated, along with every other character in the series, by Medaka so that she could collect her farewell present before leaving school.

=== Other members ===
Fukurou Tsurubami (鶴喰 梟, Tsurubami Fukurou)
The father of Kamome Tsurubami, Professor Tsurubami was the previous victor of the Jet Black Wedding Feast who arranged to decide which of the Kurokami branch families would marry Medaka. It is later revealed that Medaka's birth mother, Hato Tsurubami, was the professor's older sister, thus Professor Tsurubumi was actually Medaka's maternal uncle and would not have been able to marry her. As a result, his relationship with her was paternal in nature and he looked for aspects of his older sister in Medaka. In response to the fact that Medaka would not be able to continue the family's bloodline if she could not marry, the Ge'hyoukai arranged for his death. However, before he was apparently murdered, Fukurou managed to arrange the deaths of the remaining six suitors he originally competed against and for each family's successor to be a female trained in using language-styles, supposedly all to prevent any man from approaching the daughter of his older sister. Despite his skill in developing language-styles, he fails to register and comprehend emotional responses, which proves to be his downfall against Iihiko.
Professor Tsurubami is later revealed to be alive and residing in the abandoned Hakoniwa Hospital where Medaka and Zenkichi first met, which he admits to orchestrating shortly before his death. Though he loved his older sister as his ideal woman, her harsh personality and her disgust with his personality disappointed the professor, who decided to arrange for Hato to marry Kajiki, believing that a daughter possessing Hato's strong will and Kajiki's overflowing love would be more to his liking. However, Medaka inherited an even stronger will and more loving personality than her parents and quickly wore Fukurou out. He then arranged for Medaka and Zenkichi to meet as children, possibly to have Zenkichi's "normalcy" mellow his niece out. When that failed, Fukurou decided to have a child of his own, hoping to have a daughter who he could raise to be a more loving version of Hato. Instead, Kamome was born and Fukurou abandoned him and his mother immediately. He later decided to force a second Jet Black Wedding Feast in order to remove Medaka's need to have Hansode Shiranui as her shadow so that he could marry Shiranui, the one who should have been the most like Medaka, because Shiranui is what he loves most: an imitation, someone who is superficially similar to Medaka (and therefore Hato) while also exhibiting none of the personality traits that Fukurou found so tiresome. Knowing that he may be opposed by Iihiko Shishime who has chosen Shiranui to become his new body, Tsurubami claims that he developed a style strong enough to defeat him. However, Fukurou does not get the chance to use it at all, as he is taken by surprise and killed by Iihiko when the latter breaks into the hospital to reclaim Hansode and crushes half of the professor's body as he lands. His true death at the hands of Iihiko Shishime activates his ultimate style, "Testament User", which causes the moon to fall to the earth in the event of his death, Medaka then destroys the moon, ending Tsurubami's scheming once and for all.
Kajiki Kurokami (黒神 舵樹, Kurokami Kajiki)
The father of Maguro, Kujira, and Medaka and the current head of the Kurokami family. Out of excessive love, a trait common to the Kurokami family, he married all seven of his suitors from his Jet Black Wedding Feast according to the arrangement of Ge'hyoukai. His three children each have different mothers: Maguro is the son of the Kugurugi representative, Kujira's mother was from the Momozono family, and Medaka is the daughter of Hato Tsurubami, who died shortly after Medaka was born. Though well-intentioned, he is regarded as lacking good sense, thus many of his responsibilities for the Kurokami Group, such as being the headmaster of Hakoniwa Academy, are carried out by his shadow, Hakama Shiranui.
Hato Tsurubami (鶴喰 鳩, Tsurubami Hato)
The representative of the Tsurubami family who married Kajiki Kurokami, Hato was the mother of Medaka and the older sister of Dr. Fukurou Tsurubami. She died of a heart attack shortly after Medaka's birth, leading many to say that she had served her purpose after giving birth to Medaka and had no other reason to live afterward. Later chapters reveal that she was a nurse employed at the hospital where Hitomi Hitoyoshi worked as a psychosomatic surgeon and where Dr. Tsurubami currently resides. Much like Medaka, she is described as an extremely intimidating woman; she took her job as a nurse to extremes and would go above and beyond to ensure her patients recovered, and did not stop working even when she was pregnant or even right after she gave birth. While Fukurou had loved her as his ideal woman, he found that she was too harsh for his liking and that she was disgusted by his personality. Thus, Dr. Tsurubami arranged for her to marry Kajiki Kurokami so she would give birth to who he thought would be his ideal woman – a girl with Hato's strong will and Kajiki's overly loving nature.
Nashi Kurokami (黒神 亡, Kurokami Nashi)
The representative of the Momozono family who married Kajiki Kurokami, Nashi is Kujira Kurokami's mother and was Hato Tsurubami's best friend. Unlike Kajiki, she has no opposition towards Medaka meeting Fukurou Tsurubami and tells Kajiki give into Medaka's demand as she would just find out any way and something irreparable could happen if Kajiki attempted to prevent her from going. During the send-off challenge for Medaka at Hakoniwa, Nashi gives Medaka the flower meant to be given by Medaka's mother in Hato's place, before she and the other adults fight against her.

== Other characters ==
Hakama Shiranui (不知火 袴, Shiranui Hakama)
Voiced by: Motomu Kiyokawa (Japanese); David Wald (Season 1), David Matranga (Season 2) (English)
The chairman of Hakoniwa Academy and the grandfather of Hansode Shiranui, an elderly man who appears harmless but is actually ruthless and cunning. As the program manager of the Flask Plan, he fully intends to use the entire student population of Hakoniwa as experimental material to create the Perfect Human. To this end, he attempts to manipulate Medaka and other students to achieve the ultimate result and then use the Hakoniwa students as guinea pigs to create more Perfect Humans. When the Flask Plan is dismantled, he creates Class -13 as the successor to Class 13 and to oppose Medaka Kurokami's abilities without fully realizing the true extent of Misogi Kumagawa's power. As a member of the Shiranui family, he is a shadow for Kajiki Kurokami due to the fact Hakama has a more suitable personality to be the director of Hakoniwa.
Maguro Kurokami (黒神 真黒, Kurokami Maguro)
Voiced by: Junichi Suwabe (Japanese); Blake Shepard (English)
Medaka and Naze's older brother, a perverted young man who only cares about his two younger sisters; he loves them both obsessively, which neither sister is terribly fond of. The former supervisor of the Flask Plan, Maguro is known for his abnormal ability to analyze abnormalities and develop the most suitable methods to bring out the greatest potential of the individual; his ability gave him the project name "Magician." While his original intention to become involved with Class 13 had been to find his missing sister Kujira, he became distracted by the incredible abnormality of Oudo Miyakonojou and was Oudo's original partner. His obsession with the Flask Plan resulted in his own voluntary removal of several organs, which eventually led to dropping out the Flask Plan when he was physically incapable of continuing his involvement. Though he tends to insult Zenkichi and refuses to admit if he is worthy of Medaka, Maguro recognizes that Zenkichi has a positive influence on Medaka and wants him to remain by her side.
Hitomi Hitoyoshi (人吉 瞳, Hitoyoshi Hitomi)
Zenkichi's mother, a doctor who studied and identified abnormalities in young children and works as a "psychosomatic" surgeon. During Dr. Hitoyoshi's time at Hakoniwa Hospital, Zenkichi would often spend time at the hospital, which is when he and Medaka met for the first time when they were both two years old. Like her son, Dr. Hitoyoshi is a caring individual and loves her son a great deal. She is well respected by Medaka and many others and is effortlessly able to make Medaka dress more conservatively. Having recognized the danger of Misogi Kumagawa, Hitomi has been tracking his movements since childhood, though has failed to stop him. With Kumagawa's appearance at Hakoniwa, she enrolls as a student and enters Zenkichi's class, much to his embarrassment and dismay. Because Hitomi resembles a twelve-year-old girl, Akune initially mistakes her as Zenkichi's younger sister. Despite her appearance, she is a master of Savate and adept with fighting with needles, marking pins, and surgical thread; she is surprisingly able to hold her own against Misogi Kumagawa.
Najimi Ajimu (安心院 なじみ, Ajimu Najimi)
Voiced by: Nana Mizuki (Japanese); Brittney Karbowski (English)
Ajimu is many trillions of years old (predating the Big Bang), virtually omnipotent higher-dimensional entity, that among other things currently acts as a world spirit encompassing several hundred million human beings as individual components, and incorporating their sum total wisdom. She is the founder of Hakoniwa High School, the visionary of the Flask Plan, and Kumagawa's former vice president. Insisting on being referred to by her nickname, Anshin'in (安心院 (あんしんいん)), she is the first of a group of two that refers to themselves as the "Not Equals". She was Kumagawa's 'last love' and for unclear reasons, Kumagawa seemingly ripped her face off, and sealed her away from reality, preventing her from interacting with the world beyond popping in and out of people's dreams and subconscious until the Student Council battle during which Kumagawa's powers weakened, whereas Ajimu was set loose upon the school once more. Despite being freed, nearly all her abilities are still 'sealed' due to Kumagawa's Book Maker (represented by large metallic screws binding her arms and torso). She has commented that because of Kumagawa's reformation by Medaka, the binding is slowly weakening and will one day be completely undone. She refers to herself with boku (僕), a Japanese word for "I" mainly used by males.
Ajimu professes to maintain nearly 8 quadrillion Abnormalities, and nearly 5 quadrillion Minuses, for a total of nearly 13 quadrillion, and claims to be the embodiment of 700 million Not-Equals. Among her many skills are abilities that grant her immortality (Deadlock), omnipresence (Alibi Block), immunity to other skills (Life Zero), to turn into a dream or idea, and the talent to bequeath others with her own abilities. At the time of the Jet Black Wedding Feast, just over 600 of her talents have been given names. Ajimu is understandably possessed of a God complex, believing all people, besides herself, are equally garbage. She views all humans with about as much disdain and notice as eraser shavings, and seems to have trouble distinguishing people from the environment. She intends to further her plans after Medaka, and the current Student Council have graduated. However, aware that Medaka intends to stop her before graduating, Ajimu resorts to using Zenkichi in an attempt to have him defeat Medaka and usurp her position as the "main character". The title she gives herself is "The Inhuman That is But Equal".
It is revealed at the end of the Election arc that Najimi is aware of the fact that she is living in a manga and, unwilling to believe that her existence could be so utterly meaningless, set out to do something impossible: create a perfect human, in order for it to fail and prove that the world she is living in is real. After Zenkichi succeeds in defeating Medaka through winning the election and somewhat deconstructing her self-perceived reason of existence, Ajimu attempts to commit suicide, but is stopped by Medaka, who correctly concludes that her true problem lies in simulated reality, and being extremely weary of life. Ajimu is enrolled as a first-year student and gradually starts to care for and be more loyal towards her human friends, and tries to use her abilities as little as possible to better appreciate being alive and enjoy her time masquerading as a normal human, however brief it may last.
She is briefly sealed off from reality during the Jet Black Wedding feast, and is later seemingly killed by Iihiko when buying time for her friends to escape. A previously recorded afterimage of her later appears before Kumagawa in his dreams, presenting him with two of her skills, destroying the "unlucky star" that Misogi was born under so he could move forward, and saying that she loved him like a little brother, despite their seeming antagonism. The main ambiguous part of her supposed death is that her 700 million human component cells did not fall down dead with her, and that it would have been very easy for her to avoid through subterfuge. She later briefly appears to Zenkichi during the final confrontation with Iihiko, revealing that she did in fact survive, but has not reentered the main storyline.
Hanten Shiranui (不知火 半纏, Shiranui Hanten)
A student who transferred to Hakoniwa alongside Ajimu, Hanten is described as "The Inhuman That is But There". Classified as a "Not Equal" along with Ajimu, he is a member of the same family as Hansode and the headmaster. Hanten has been Ajimu's companion for over 150 years, having been recognized as the first being that she encountered in over three trillion years who possessed the same nature as her, though in truth his status as a Not-Equal came about when he became her shadow. He is responsible for establishing the Shiranui family to support the Kurokami group and protecting unique existences from the shadows; according to the Shiranui family, their hidden village was founded on the site where he first appeared. Since his introduction, Hanten's face has not been seen, as he always stands behind Ajimu with his back turned to the viewer or is concealed by other means, like speech bubbles.
Upon Najimi's death at the hands of Iihiko, he reveals that he has been prompted to act now that his and Ajimu's positions have been reversed, revealing his face and speaking for the first time. As with Anshin'in, he requests to be called Hanten'in (反転院 (はんてんいん)). As her shadow, he had anticipated that Anshin'in would outlive him, and had founded the Shiranui village so there would be successors to his role as a protector of unique existences such as Najimi. His ability is capable of creating any ability he wants. Hanten used this skill to create Devil Style for Zenkichi and at least 100 skills for Ajimu. Unlike most skills in Medaka Box, this skill wasn't given name, so it's described only as "The skill to make skills". Hanten reveals that the power came about in response to helping Anshin'in fulfill the Flask Plan as she envisioned it.

== Works cited ==
- "Ch." and "Vol." are shortened forms for chapter and volume and refer to the appropriate sections in the Medaka Box manga, written by Nisio Isin, illustrated by Akira Akatsuki, published by Shueisha in 18 volumes.
- "Ep." is shortened form for episode and refers to an episode number of the Medaka Box anime. "AB Ep." refers to episodes in Medaka Box Abnormal.
