= Live Best =

Greatest hits album by Girugamesh
- Released: March 26, 2014
- Genre: Alternative metal, rap metal, nu metal, punk rock, metalcore
- Length: 67:29
- Language: Japanese, English
- Label: Danger Crue

Girugamesh chronology
Monster (2013)	Live Best (2014)	Gravitation (2014)

Alternative covers
- Limited edition cover

Live Best is a compilation album by Girugamesh, released on March 26, 2014. It released to commemorate Girugamesh's tenth anniversary as a band. The album is not a live album, but a collection of tracks the band often included in their set lists, which is why it is titled Live Best. The track list is put together with the image of a concert set list. The album also has the purpose of serving as a guide to Girugamesh's live shows. All songs have been re-mixed, and some parts have been re-recorded.

== Track listing ==
No.	Title	Original appearance	Length
1.	"patchwork"	girugämesh	3:32
2.	"Omae ni Sasageru Minikui Koe" (お前に捧げる醜い声; "Ugly Voice Dedicated To You")	Reason of Crying	3:48
3.	"Dirty Story"	Now	3:46
4.	"Vision"	Inochi no Ki	3:31
5.	"Freaks"	Music	3:06
6.	"Ultimate 4"	Music	2:53
7.	"bit crash"	Now	2:33
8.	"Crazy-Flag"	girugämesh	3:39
9.	"Mission Code"	Go	3:35
10.	"Zantetsuken" (斬鉄拳; "Sharp Iron Fist")	Monster	3:19
11.	"Suiren" (睡蓮; "Water Lilly")	Now	3:52
12.	"Volcano"	Volcano	4:30
13.	"Break Down"	Music	3:27
14.	"Shadan" (遮断; "Block")	13's Reborn	3:36
15.	"Border"	Border	3:36
16.	"smash!!"	Reason of Crying	4:04
17.	"Never Ending Story"	Go	4:19
18.	"evolution"	Music	3:56
19.	"Future"	Previously Unreleased; exclusive to regular edition	3:51

Limited edition DVD: music video collection
No.	Title	Length
1.	"Owari to Mirai"
2.	"Vermillion"
3.	"Kowareteiku Sekai"
4.	"Break Down"
5.	"Alive"
6.	"Border"
7.	"crying rain"
8.	"Dirty Story"
9.	"arrow"
10.	"Color"
11.	"Inochi no Ki"
12.	"destiny"
13.	"evolution"
