= Miya (musician) =

Japanese musician (born 1979)

Miya ミヤ
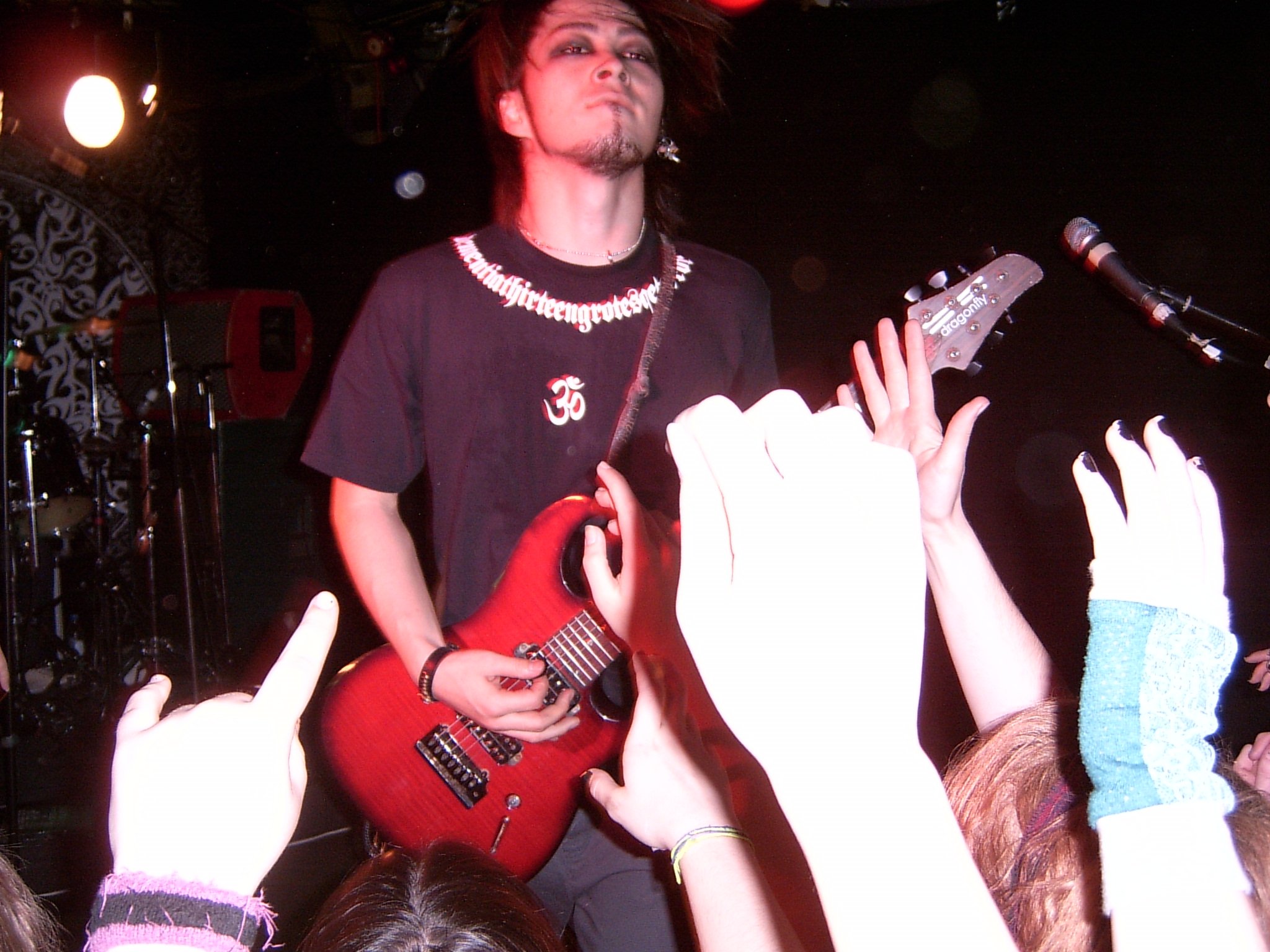
- Miya on stage in London, 2007

Background information
- Also known as: 1979
- Born: Masaaki Yaguchi; July 26, 1979 (age 47); Ishioka, Ibaraki, Japan
- Genres: Rock; heavy metal
- Occupations: Musician, songwriter, record producer, audio engineer, DJ
- Instrument: Guitar
- Years active: 1996–present
- Member of: Mucc; Petit Brabancon

Masaaki Yaguchi (Japanese: 矢口雅哲; born July 26, 1979), better known as Miya (ミヤ), is a Japanese musician, songwriter, and record producer. He is best known as guitarist and leader of the visual kei rock band Mucc since 1997. He is also a guitarist of the supergroup Petit Brabancon. In addition to his work as a musician, Miya also works as a DJ and as a record producer and audio engineer for other artists. His private recording studio is named Sixinc Studio2. He also makes and sells homemade audio equipment with engineer Koji Watanabe under the brand name Yaguchi Watanabe Densen (矢口渡邉電線).

== Early life ==
Miya was born on July 26, 1979, in rural Ishioka, Ibaraki, Japan. He described the area around his parents' house as village-like, and said his grandfather's house had cows, pigs, and goats around it. With both parents music teachers, Miya practiced classical piano everyday from an early age and was taken to classical concerts, but did not particularly care for it. He only became interested in music in elementary school due to video game music, particularly the soundtracks to Dragon Quest III (1988) and IV (1990); the former being the first CD he ever bought. He began composing music, using the memory function on his keyboard to record songs which were similar to the background music of those games. In fifth grade Miya started listening to Japanese music, such as Tube and B'z. He also remembers being shocked by his parents' vinyl copy of Yōsui Inoue's Kōri no Sekai, and particularity impressed by its lyrics. Around the same time, his older brother gave him an X Japan cassette and he fell in love with the band after being shocked to hear them blend loud rock and classical music together, and by their visual appearance. It was because of X Japan that he began to play guitar at age 14, and their concert at the Tokyo Dome in 1994 was the first rock concert he attended.

It was his first year of junior high school when Miya decided he wanted to make a living in music. Miya was a poor student in junior high; he had bad grades in every class except for music and physical education, because he did not attend them. By the time he was in high school, Miya was a regular visitor of live houses. Although he was in a cover band in junior high, it was in high school that he formed a band that played original compositions. Miya has said that D'erlanger was the reason he started a band. His first band was Kadena (カデナ), where his stage name was written as 雅. At 17, he played drums for a year. Having grown up playing the taiko drums at local festivals and having watched a lot of live videos of his favorite bands, he said he played pretty well right from the start, but felt he could better express himself with guitar. Miya was a roadie for fellow Ibaraki Prefecture natives Cali Gari.

== Career ==
In high school, Miya formed Mucc in 1997 with vocalist Tatsuro, drummer Satochi, and bassist Hiro, whom he had been friends with since primary school. After graduating, they moved to Tokyo. In 1999, Hiro left and was replaced on bass by Miya's childhood friend Yukke on February 22. Miya is the leader and principal songwriter of the band, and produces, records and masters their recordings. He also determines their live setlists, and discusses with the engineers on how to mic everything for live performances. Antique, their debut EP, was released in 1999 by Misshitsu Neurose, an independent record label formed by Cali Gari guitarist Ao Sakurai. Mucc later signed to Danger Crue Records and established their own sublabel, Shu, for the 2002 release of their second album Hōmura Uta. However, the band made their major label debut on Universal with Zekū the following year. In 2009, they returned to being an indie band on Danger Crue, before signing to Sony for 2012's Shangri-La. With the end of 2017, Mucc returned to being an independent band on Danger Crue yet again.

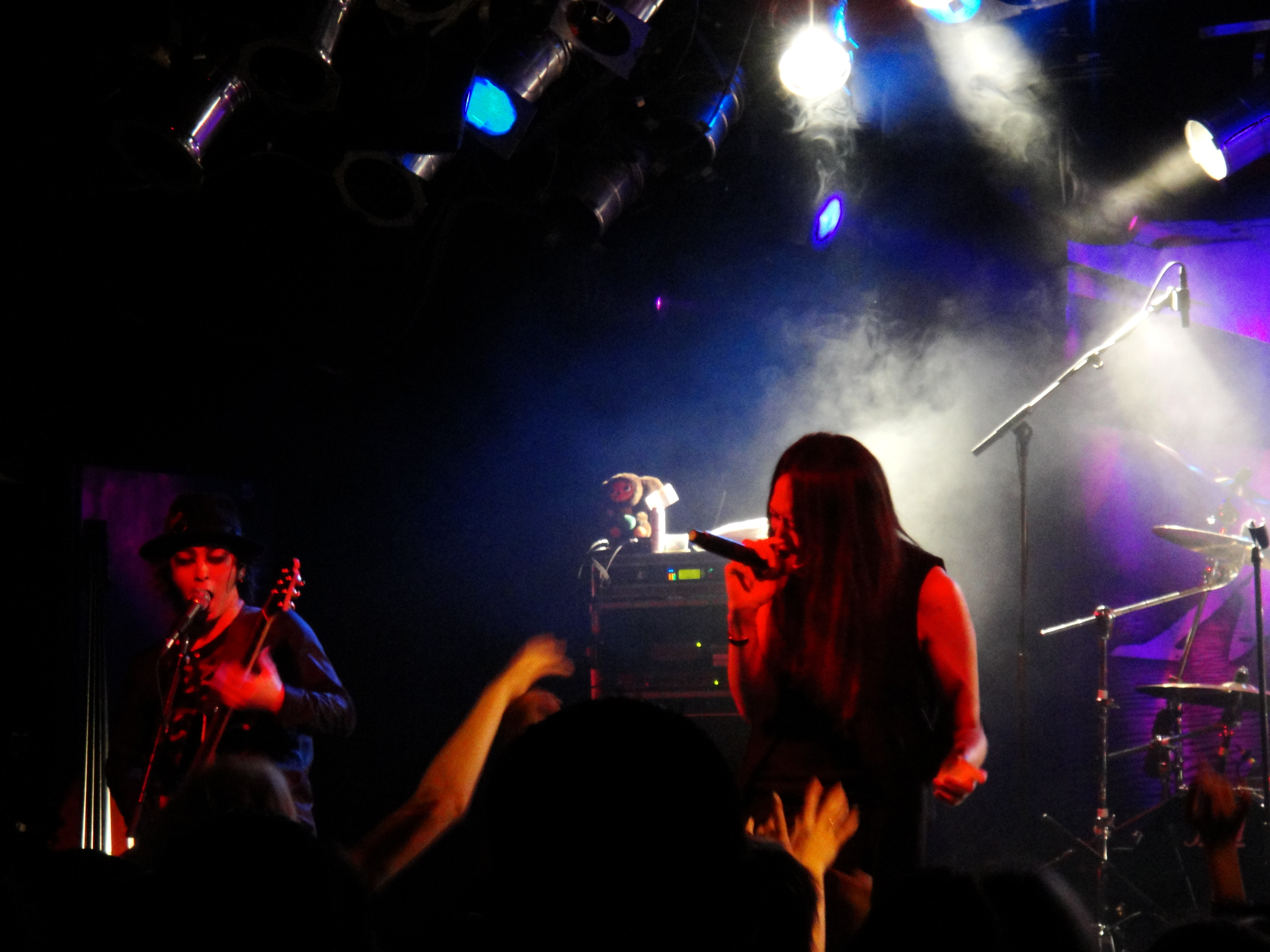
Miya (left) performing with Mucc in Malmö, 2009

At the end of 2003, Miya formed the rock band GeKiGaKutai (激楽隊) with Nezaki (La Vie En Rose), Tsuyoshi (Jully), and Yoshida (Three 9). They released the album Tokyo on May 25, 2005. Miya co-produced Girugamesh's 2007 self-titled album, in addition to providing backing vocals on two of its songs. Miya also works as a DJ under his real name and the stage name 1979. 1979 started in 2010 as a duo with Kei Yamamoto. He became interested in DJing when he saw the Disco Twins open for Yuksek and realized that DJs do not just provide something to dance to, they are also artists. Miya later formed the DJ duo Gizmo Killed the Stripes with Arata Nakamura. He also organizes club events titled Mogwai, which feature fellow rock musicians acting as DJs. Miya provided guest guitar work on the title track of Roach's 2012 mini-album No Reason in the Pit, and co-mixed Tokyo Shoegazer's 2013 album Turnaround.

Miya appears on January 2015's Arise, the first solo album by Sid bassist Aki. He is also a member of X Suginami (X杉並), an X Japan cover band formed in 2015 with Dancho (Nogod), Yuu (Merry), Akane (ex-The Scanty), and Daisuke (Jupiter). In the group, Miya dresses up as Pata. In 2015, Miya organized the Commune concert event series at the request of the founder of Danger Crue Records, who asked him to capture the feeling of the old Danger Crue. Its title comes from the Haruki Murakami novel 1Q84. Featuring acts such as D'erlanger, Girugamesh, and Dezert, two installments were held; one in Osaka on August 29, and one in Tokyo on September 5. Commune Vol. 2 followed on November 25 and 26, 2016. It featured acts such as Plastic Tree, Arlequin, and Metronome.

Miya was a guest at X Japan's April 11, 2018, concert at Zepp DiverCity, where he joined the band onstage for "Kurenai". When X Japan guitarist Sugizo was having difficulties acquiring a visa to enter the US for the band's April 14, 2018, performance at Coachella, Miya was named as his possible stand-in. Sugizo ultimately made it to the concert, but Miya still joined them on stage for the song "X". Since 2019, Miya has periodically performed as a member of Kyono's backing band. Miya remixed Merry's song "Sheeple" for the limited edition of their April 2019 mini-album For Japanese Sheeple. He also mixed and mastered Otoloop's album Reimei no Ao, and arranged and produced the song "Suzanna no Junketsu" on Sixx's album Rollin' Life. That year he also arranged the music and played guitar and bass for a promotional video for the Obaken Zombie Land haunted house at Sanrio Puroland. He was sound producer for the livestream of Arlequin's Cinematic Circus #001 concert on July 21, 2020, and was in charge of the audio mastering for the livestream of Dezert's Special Live 2020 "The Today" concert on November 23, 2020.

Miya is a guitarist in the supergroup Petit Brabancon with Yukihiro, Kyo, antz (Tokyo Shoegazer), and Hirofumi Takamatsu (The Novembers). It was Yukihiro who suggested Miya join, because he needed someone more prolific in composing than himself and believed Miya would also match Kyo's style of loud music. Miya accepted after talking and drinking with Kyo and learning all that the two had in common, such as upbringings and music tastes. He started composing songs for Petit Brabancon in 2018, but the band was not publicly announced until late 2021. In 2021, Miya mastered the omnibus album Ibarakidai Bakuhatsu, which features numerous artists from his native Ibaraki Prefecture. Also for the album, Miya wrote, composed and arranged "Ibara" by 178R; a band consisting of him, Masashi Yamada (The Back Horn), Yuya Honda (Cock Roach), Satoshi Murata (Yagi Tsukai), and Kazi (Human Tail). He also wrote and arranged the song "Hello" for the rock band Gyroaxia from the Argonavis from BanG Dream! multimedia project, and mastered Zigzo's album Across the Horizon. In 2022, he recorded, mixed and mastered Disco Volante's album Identified Flying Object, and mixed and mastered Otoloop's album Unknown Bravers. The following year, Miya mastered Gibkiy Gibkiy Gibkiy's singles "Hedo" and "Oni -Re:master-". He wrote the lyrics to and arranged the song "Nebula", which was composed by his Mucc bandmate Yukke, for the September 2023 Ensemble Stars!! album Trip Volume 03: Double Face.

Miya plays guitar on "Blood: 2.0" from Deadman's 2024 self-cover album Living Hell.

== Songwriting and musicianship ==
Mucc is known for switching between music genres and styles frequently. Miya has said he personally likes bands that are ever-changing and play a wide variety of genres. He also explained that Mucc shapes songs together as a band, so any song he starts to write will end up different in the end. When composing songs, Miya said he often starts with the beat. He then creates the basic outline of the chords and melody, before thinking of the overall arrangement. Despite being a guitarist, Miya stated that he gives the instrument the least amount of thought. He has no particular connection to guitar, he just happened to choose it as the tool to express his music. After moving to Tokyo in the late 1990s, he started listening to Western music and became inspired by Slipknot and Korn. Korn frontman Jonathan Davis influenced him to pursue intense personal expressions in Mucc. Miya said prior to Zekū (2003) and Kuchiki no Tō (2004), his lyrics were about past events and "traumas" he experienced, but with those two albums he wrote about present inner feelings within the band. Despite audiences loving the shows, he seems to regret having done this as he speculated that he drank a lot on those tours so he would not have to face what he was expressing on stage, and stated that there is one song on Kuchiki no Tō that he will no longer play. Speaking of his lyrics in 2009, Miya said "I used to write the lyrics only about the things that are totally disastrous, but now I'm not in the mood to write that kind of lyrics. I have grown out of that. As I've gotten older, I've figured out some solutions to the problem and I take that into the lyrics. Miya said he does not write English lyrics because he does not understand the language and using them for their sounds alone would not be the same; "If the words I write don't have a soul, then they can't become a song". In 2012, Miya said since he started DJing he has listened to a much wider range of music, and talking to the people at the clubs and bars provides him with a lot of material for lyrics. After focusing on melody, Miya became interested in folk music and said this led to Mucc including elements of dance music in their material.

Although he has a reputation as a "loud" guitarist, Miya said his roots come from Boøwy guitarist Tomoyasu Hotei. Before hearing Boøwy, Miya said he had no concept of rhythm guitar because he had only covered X Japan up to that point. But Boøwy's "percussive" guitar became the foundation of his own style. Miya has called X Japan guitarist Hide a "guitar hero" and said he taught him that "even Japanese music can be rock". According to Aie of Deadman, Miya was one of many Ibaraki musicians who at one point imitated Cali Gari guitarist Ao Sakurai. Miya cited Korn as the reason he started using seven-string guitars. He said while they allow him to play a large range of music, they do not work very well on downtunings. In 2004, Miya said he rarely plays guitar solos because he does not really like them. He remarked that they are fine if they are like interludes, but he finds it embarrassing to go out front and command attention. However, Mucc's album Shin Sekai (2022) has many guitar solos because he decided not to use any synthesizers on it. For the album, Miya said he would often use a modern approach to retro-sounding songs, and vice versa. In Petit Brabancon, Miya said that he takes the supporting guitar role, playing slightly behind Antz to give a three-dimensional sound. He also said that his guitar is panned to the left, while Antz's guitar is heard from the right. Like the other members of Mucc, Miya often performs barefoot, stating, "It's simply easier to move that way".

== Equipment ==
Miya has a Fernandes TE-85 guitar with EMG pickups that he got in high school. Described as "the one you can't let go of", it has a custom paint job featuring moths. He has a Psychederhythm Jazzmaster Type that he uses to record all the time, but rarely uses on stage. It makes noise from simply touching the pickguard, so he put tape on it to prevent that. He has been using a Sugi DH500C EM/AT/SBK since Mucc's album Kyūtai (2009). Despite being semi-hollow, he said it has an orthodox six-string sound. As of November 2020, his main six-string was a Yamaha Revstar RSP20CR, which he originally bought for its appearance. But he also ended up liking the sound and used it on Aku. Miya also bought a Maybury Guitars Recycled RAM T-Type based purely on its appearance after seeing it on Instagram. It is built with pieces of reclaimed wood spliced together, for what he called a "steampunk-esque" look. He described the semi-hollow guitar as sounding like a vintage Fender Telecaster and uses it for songs that work with single coil sounds. Miya has two Dragonfly Border Custom 666s; one with a walnut color and a "dark and intense" sound, and a dark green one with different controls and a paint job by a friend of his. In August 2022, he obtained a turquoise and pink Dragonfly Premero, a model designed in collaboration with Pablo of Pay Money to My Pain. With a regular tuning, Miya uses it for songs requiring a single coil sound. When he needs an acoustic sound, Miya uses a Fender Acoustasonic Telecaster. In July 2023, Miya unveiled two new guitars on Petite Brabancon's Indented Bite Mark tour. He described the Moon Reggae Master as his main guitar "for now", and the Gold Foil Telecaster as his substitute.

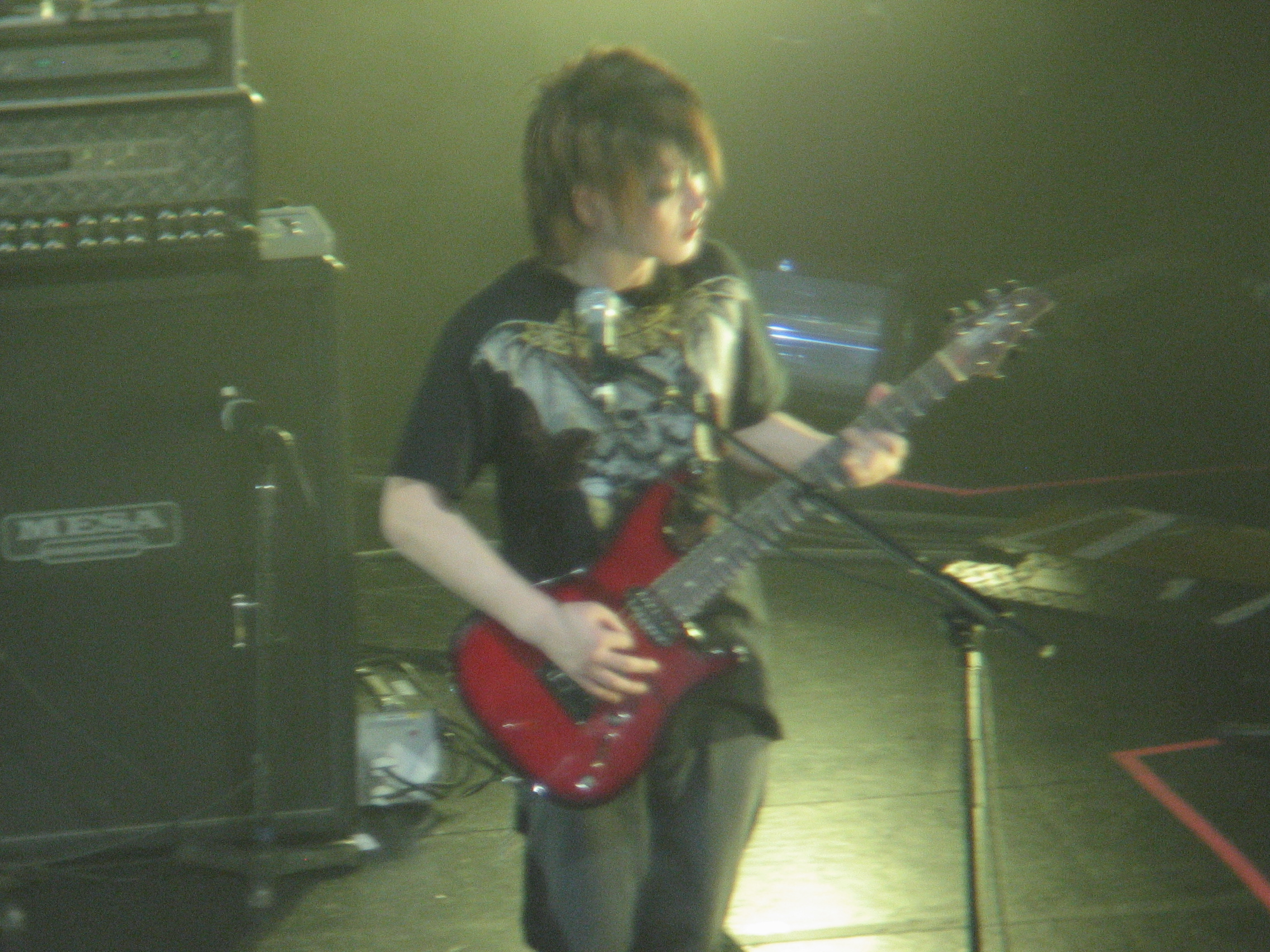
Miya predominantly uses seven-string guitars.

However, Miya mainly uses seven-string guitars. He developed an EXL-7st with Dragonfly that he used as his main seven-string in Mucc until 2016. It has a Honduras mahogany back and flame maple top, with a maple neck and rosewood fingerboard, and had the volume knob removed because his hand hit it while playing. Recently, Miya has predominantly been using Hapas Guitars made in Germany. He saw the brand on Instagram and, unable to test it out, bought and imported a black and red Sludge727 Custom Shop Limited based on its appearance alone. He liked it and then ordered a black and red six-string from Hapas. Although he asked for it to have a 27" scale length, it came in 25.5" instead. Around July 2020, Miya acquired a Sludge727 with a sunburst paint job. It was his main guitar for live and studio recordings with Mucc, but was also used to record Petit Brabancon's "Pull the Trigger" and "Kawaki" due to having a "hard and modern sound". Just before recording Mucc's 2022 album Shin Sekai, Miya received a black and green Sludge727 Custom Shop Limited with two humbucker pickups. It was described as having a "tight, high-pitched sound with a sense of speed". With a Drop A tuning, it was his most frequently used guitar on Resonance of the Corpse, Petit Brabancon's first tour in September 2022. Just before rehearsals for the tour, Miya received a different Sludge727, with a black and red paint job, that he mainly uses in Drop G tuning. Miya has a Mayones Regius 7, that he described as the exact opposite of the Hapas guitars as it is "very well-balanced" and has clean separation of highs and lows. It too has the volume knob removed.

Miya uses both Mesa/Boogie Triple Rectifier guitar amplifiers and a Kemper Profiler for live performances with Mucc. For Petite Brabancon, he uses Mesa Boogie Dual Rectifire amps. The cabinets feature the artwork created by Takato Yamamoto for the cover of Myakuhaku. He stated that he made Kemper profiles of all the expensive amps that L'Arc-en-Ciel guitarist Ken uses, such as Magnatone and Friedman. He is also a big fan of the Ecstasy series of cabinets made by Bogner in the 1990s, but has a hard time finding them. When Totalfat guitarist Kuboty posted about one he found on Instagram, Miya bought it immediately. Miya uses many effects pedals due to Mucc's wide range of music. He separates them into two guitar pedalboards (he previously had three) laid out in an L-like shape; the larger main one has those that are operated through a programmable switcher and is placed horizontally on one of his sides (his left in Mucc and his right in Petit Brabancon), while the smaller one placed in front of him is for those he operates in real time. The pedals are a mix of old and new and he is often switching them out, selling the ones he no longer will use. He has used a Boss SE-70 multi-effector since junior high school.

== Discography ==
Work	Artist	Year	Role	Ref.
Tokyo	GeKiGaKutai	2005		
Girugamesh	Girugamesh	2007	Co-producer, backing vocals on "Stupid" and "Crazy-Flag"	
No Reason in the Pit	Roach	2012	Guest guitar on "No Reason in the Pit"	
Turnaround	Tokyo Shoegazer	2013	Co-mixing engineer	
Arise	Aki	2015	Guest guitar on "Jiu" (ジウ)	
For Japanese Sheeple	Merry	2019	Remixer of "Sheeple Living Dead Remix"	
Reimei no Ao (黎明の碧)	Otoloop	2019	Mixing and mastering engineer	
Rollin' Life	Sixx	2019	Arranger and producer of "Suzanna no Junketsu" (スザンナの純潔)	
Ibarakidai Bakuhatsu (茨城大爆発)	Various artists	2021	Mastering engineer	
One	Gyroaxia	2021	Writer and arranger of "Hello"	
Across the Horizon	Zigzo	2021	Mastering engineer	
Kyono Live!! "S.A.L" 2021	Kyono	2021	Guitar	
Unidentified Flying Object	Disco Volante	2022	Recording, mixing and mastering engineer	
Unknown Bravers	Otoloop	2022	Mixing and mastering engineer	
Identified Flying Object -Songs from Frontier-	Disco Volante	2022	Recording engineer	
"Kodō" (鼓動)	ANKH	2022	Featured artist, guitar, recording and mixing engineer	
"Hedo" (反吐)	Gibkiy Gibkiy Gibkiy	2023	Mastering engineer	
"Oni -Re:master-" (鬼-re:master-)	Gibkiy Gibkiy Gibkiy	2023	Mastering engineer	
"Ikichi -Re:master-" (生き血-re:master-)	Gibkiy Gibkiy Gibkiy	2023	Mastering engineer	
Trip Volume 03: Double Face	Ensemble Stars!!	2023	Lyricist and arranger of "Nebula" (ネビュラ)	
"Mushizu" (虫唾)	Gibkiy Gibkiy Gibkiy	2023	Mastering engineer	
Living Hell	Deadman	2024	Guest guitar on "Blood: 2.0"	
Hanshi Hanshō	Gibkiy Gibkiy Gibkiy	2024	Remastering	
"Hedo Ikichi Mushizu"	Gibkiy Gibkiy Gibkiy	2024	Mastering engineer	
Vomir	Gibkiy Gibkiy Gibkiy	2026	Mastering	
