= Kuchiki =

Kuchiki (朽木, "decayed tree") may refer to:

== Characters in Bleach ==
- Byakuya Kuchiki
- Ginrei Kuchiki
- Hisana Kuchiki
- Rukia Kuchiki
- Soujun Kuchiki

== Other uses ==
- Kuchiki taoshi, a single leg takedown in Judo
- Kuchiki no Tō, 2004 album by the Japanese band Mucc
- Natasha Kuchiki (born 1976), professional figure skater
