= Lee Yong-shin =

South Korean voice actress and singer

Lee Yong-shin 이용신
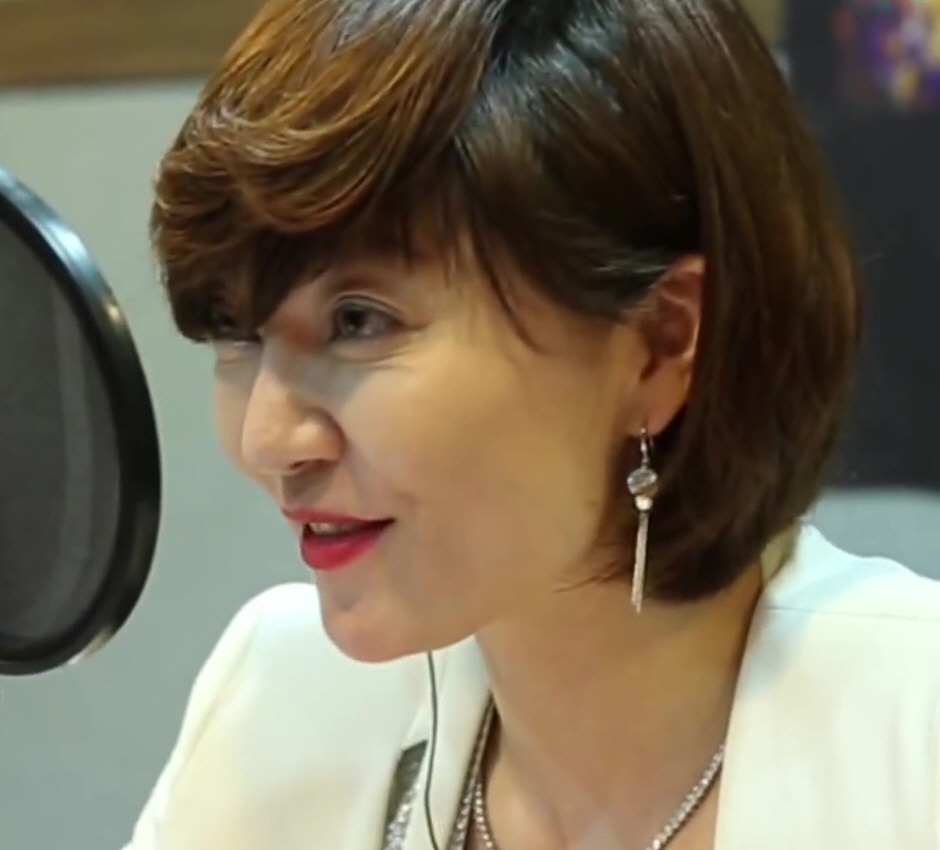
- Lee in 2013
- Born: Lee Yong-shin; February 27, 1975 (age 51); Seoul, South Korea
- Occupations: Voice actress; singer
- Years active: 2003–present

Korean name
- Hangul: 이용신
- Hanja: 李鎔臣
- RR: I Yongsin
- MR: I Yongsin
- Website: Official website (in Korean)

Lee Yong-shin (Korean: 이용신; born February 27, 1975) is a South Korean voice actress and singer born and raised in Seoul, South Korea.

She began her career by joining CJ ENM's voice acting division in 2003. In the following year, she gained popularity with her role as Mitsuki Kōyama (known as Luna in South Korea) on the Korean dub of Full Moon. She gave birth to a masterpiece called new future in the full moon. Since then, Lee has dubbed numerous television animation series such as Alice Academy, My Guardian Characters, Sgt. Frog and Tsubasa: Reservoir Chronicle. She also participated in dubbing video games, voicing Ahri of League of Legends and Nova Terra of StarCraft II: Wings of Liberty.

In addition to having been highly active as a voice actress, Lee has recently built her career as a singer by holding her first solo live concert in 2010 and releasing her first studio album in 2013. Her debut album, Type Control, was reported to be the first full-length album recorded by a voice actor in Lee's native country.

== Discography ==
Studio albums

Album #	Album information	Track listing	Peak chart positions	Sales
Album #	Album information	Track listing	KOR	Sales
1st	Type Control: Release date: November 15, 2013 (Digital) November 19, 2013 (Physical); Label: Vitamin Entertainment, P&M Korea; Formats: CD, Digital download	1. "Little Blossom"; 2. "Because of You"; 3. "Now Is the Time to Love" (featuring Bak Hyeong-jun and Kim Jang); 4. "In the Booth" (outtake); 5. "Nine Tails Maid"; 6. "No Day But Today"; 7. "Once Again Spring Comes"; 8. "Freezia"; 9. "Another Me" (opening theme from the Korean dub of My Guardian Characters)	62 (Overall) 54 (Domestic)	KOR: TBA
