= Myco =

Myco may refer to:

- relating to fungi
- Myco (singer) (born 1979), Japanese singer
- Richard Mico or Myco (1590–1661), English composer
