= Monster (Girugamesh album) =

Studio album by Girugamesh
- Released: 27 November 2013
- Genre: Alternative metal; nu metal; industrial rock
- Language: Japanese
- Label: Danger Crue

Girugamesh chronology
GO (2011)	Monster (2013)	LIVE BEST (2014)

Singles from MONSTER
- 1. "Zecchou BANG!!" Released: 4 July 2012; 2. "Zantetsuken" Released: 26 September 2012

Monster is the sixth, and currently final, studio album from the band Girugamesh, which was released on 27 November 2013.

== Release ==
Work on this album began as early as 2011 with the single "Zecchou Bang!!" first being performed on 27 December, 'Jack in the Box 2011'. "Zecchou Bang!!" was officially released on 4 July 2012. After the band's final show in 2012 at the Hibiya Open-Air Concert Hall the band took a short hiatus which they called 'Girugamequest XIII' to prepare themselves for their 10th anniversary in 2014. During this time they wrote Monster. A free event called 'absolute 0 decision' and the single "Incomplete" were announced on 23 August 2013, nine months after their hiatus was announced. During absolute 0 decision the band performed three songs: "Drain", "Incomplete" and "Resolution". The performance was live streamed online for free, shortly after this event Monster was announced.

On 13 October 2013, the band hosted an event called 'Oneman Live G#' at Shibuya-AX where two more new songs "Antlion Pit" and "Another Way" were performed for the first time, this performance was temporarily available on Danger Crue's YouTube Channel. On 30 November at Monster Takamatsu the entire album was performed including the B-sides: "Takt" and "Limit Break". The album was followed up by two tours across Japan and Europe along with a compilation album, Live-Best.

== Track listing ==
Disc one
No.	Title	Length
1.	"Intro"
2.	"Drain"
3.	"Voltage"
4.	"Incomplete"
5.	"Zantetsuken" (斬鉄拳 -MONSTER ver.-)
6.	"Antlion Pit"
7.	"Resolution"
8.	"Bad End Dream"
9.	"Live is Life"
10.	"Zecchou Bang!!" (絶頂BANG!! -MONSTER ver.-)
11.	"Another way"
12.	"ALONE"

European Bonus Tracks
No.	Title	Length
13.	"Limit Break"
14.	"Takt"

Disc Two ("Limited Edition DVD")
No.	Title	Length
1.	"2013.10.13 SHIBUYA-AX "G＃" DIGEST"
