= Hush!! Full Band Festival =

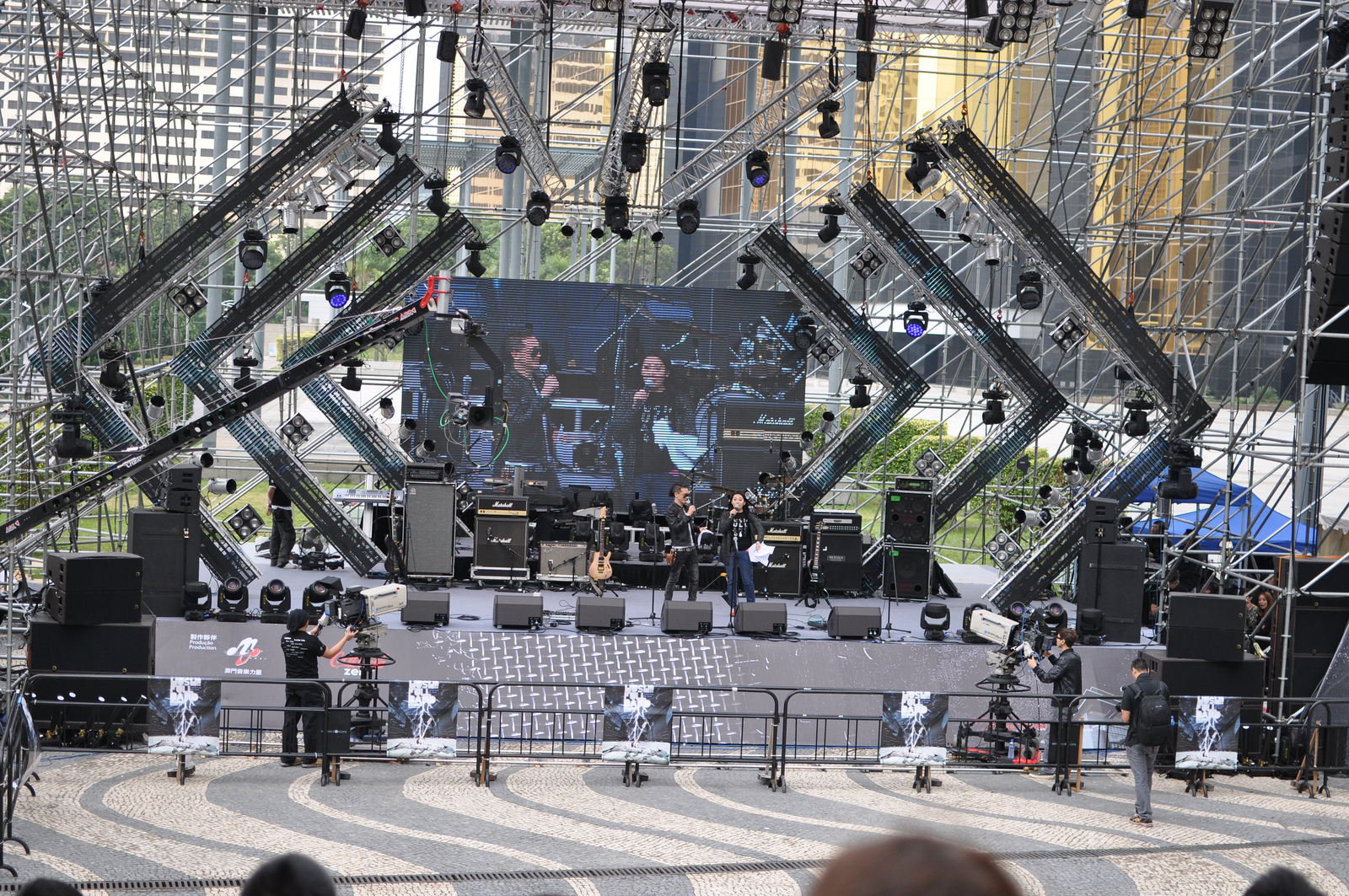
Stage of Hush!! Full Band Festival 2013 in Macau

The Hush!! Full Band Festival is a free entrance government-sponsored music festival focussing on local rock music with invited international guest bands.

== History ==
In 2005, the Hush!! Full Band Festival got established, a government-sponsored modern music festival featuring pop rock and hard rock bands from all over Asia with a focus on Macau bands. The festival is free of charge and it's in its 9th edition in 2013.

=== Band Lists ===
==== 2013 ====
- Girugamesh
- Blademark
- Scamper
- Bomber
- WhyOceans
- Sugar Plum Ferry
