= Type Control =

Studio album by Lee Yong-shin
- Released: November 15, 2013
- Recorded: August–October 2013
- Genre: K-pop; ballad; urban R&B; rock; bossa nova
- Length: 30:03
- Language: Korean
- Label: Vitamin Entertainment, P&M Korea

Singles from Type Control
- 1. "Because of You (그대 때문에)" Released: November 15, 2013

Type Control (sometimes titled Type Control yongshin) is the debut studio album of South Korean voice actress and recording artist Lee Yong-shin. The tracks from the album were digitally released on November 15, 2013, and physical copies were released on November 19. The album contains nine tracks, including the lead single "Because of You". It also features "Another Me", the opening theme for the Korean dub of My Guardian Characters, as a bonus track.

Bak Hyeong-jun, who composed the track "Now Is the Time to Love" and voice actor Kim Jang participated on the album as featured artists. Prior to its release, Type Control was reported to be the first full-length album ever recorded by a voice actor in South Korea.

Type Control debuted on the Gaon Albums Chart on the fifth week of November 2013, entering at number 62.

== Background and album information ==
Production costs for Type Control were funded through web donations, which were held on the crowdfunding site UCANFUNDING from July 31 to September 30, 2013. The amount required for the funding was set to ₩2 million ($2,000), but thanks to fans' support, the collection raised over ₩12 million ($12,000) at the end of the funding.

According to Lee's official Twitter, the album includes a total of nine tracks, with one outtake featured ("In the Booth"). The genres, ranging from ballad to rock, bossa nova, and so on, enable listeners to select which type of music from the album they want to listen to, like choosing characters by type on video games. Lee wrote the lyrics for two songs on the album ("Nine Tails Maid" and "No Day But Today"), and her fellow voice actor Kim Jang participated in working on the album as a featured artist ("Now Is the Time to Love"). The album also features "Another Me" (Korean: 또 다른 나; RR: Tto dareun na), which was used as the opening theme for the Korean dub of Japanese television animation series My Guardian Characters, as a thank-you gift for the singer's fans who have waited for her first studio album since her debut as a voice actor.

Type Control was originally scheduled to be released on late October 2013. However, on October 29, 2013, it was announced that the release date was postponed to the following month for enhancing the quality of the album.

== Release ==
On November 12, 2013, Lee uploaded a video teaser for the lead track "Because of You" (그대 때문에; Geudae ttaemune) through Nine Tails Entertainment's YouTube channel. The lead single and its music video were released along with the whole album three days later.

== Track listing ==
CD/Digital download
No.	Title	Lyrics	Music	Length
1.	"Little Blossom"	Kim Hyeon	Kim Hyeon	3:46
2.	"Because of You" (그대 때문에; Geudae ttaemune)	Bae Eun-jeong	Kwon Gyu-jin	3:54
3.	"Now Is the Time to Love" (지금은 사랑할 시간; Jigeumeun saranghal sigan, featuring Bak Hyeong-jun and Kim Jang)	Bak Hyeong-jun	Bak Hyeong-jun	3:31
4.	"In the Booth" (outtake)			0:36
5.	"Nine Tails Maid"	Lee Yong-shin, Bak Hyeong-jun	Bak Hyeong-jun	4:02
6.	"No Day But Today"	Lee Yong-shin	Noh Soo-yoon	3:22
7.	"Once Again Spring Comes" (다시 봄이 오고; Dasi bomi ogo)	Yang Yeong-ho	Yang Yeong-ho	4:30
8.	"Freezia" (프리지아)	Ye Eun-soo	Ye Eun-soo	3:25
9.	"Another Me" (또 다른 나; Tto dareun na, opening theme from the Korean dub of My Guardian Characters)	Hwang Gyu-dong	Hwang Gyu-dong	2:57
Total length:				30:03

== Chart performance ==
Country	Chart	Peak position
South Korea	Gaon Weekly Albums Chart	62

== Release history ==
Country	Date	Format	Label
South Korea	November 15, 2013	Digital download	Vitamin Entertainment, P&M Korea
South Korea	November 19, 2013	CD	Vitamin Entertainment, P&M Korea
