= Yakkun Sakurazuka =

Japanese comedian and voice actor

- 桜塚 やっくん
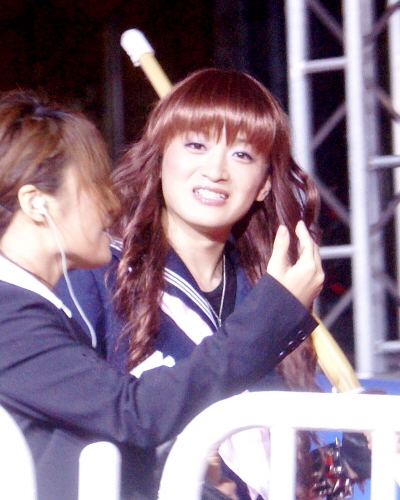
- Yakkun Sakurazuka as "Sukeban Kyoko" in April 2007
- Born: Yasuo Saitō; September 24, 1976; Tsurumi-ku, Yokohama, Japan
- Died: October 5, 2013 (aged 37); Mine, Yamaguchi, Japan
- Occupations: Comedian; singer; voice actor
- Years active: 1999–2013
- Known for: Sukeban Kyoko

Yasuo Saitō (斎藤 恭央, Saitō Yasuo; September 24, 1976 – October 5, 2013), also known by the stage name Yakkun Sakurazuka (桜塚 やっくん, Sakurazuka Yakkun), was a Japanese comedian, singer, and voice actor.

== Early life ==
Saitō was born in Kanagawa Prefecture to Mitsuru and Misao Saitō on 24 September 1976. He had a younger brother named Masashi and graduated from Nihon University's College of Art. As a teenager, he was an active Johnny's member.

== Career ==
In 1999, Saitō formed a comedy duo called Abare Nunchaku with fellow up-and-coming comedian Kosuke Takeuchi. The team broke up in 2005, but they reunited in 2006 on the show Enta no kami-sama, where Saitō appeared for the first time as Sukeban Kyoko, a delinquent schoolgirl always seen carrying shinai bamboo sword. He appeared as Sukeban on Quiz $ Millionaire in 2007, where he answered incorrectly in the final round, decreasing his earnings from ¥10,000,000 to ¥1,000,000.

He made his musical debut in 2006 with the release of the single Geki Maji Mukatsuku. By the time of his death, he had released seven albums: Gekimajimukatsuku, 1000% SO Zakune?, Christmaster, Doonacchattendayo, Kaisou Rasputin, Sakura Revolution, and Aserunda Joshi Ha Itsumo Medatanai K. He also sang with the band Bijomen Z, a musical group where all its members dressed as women.

As a voice actor, Saitō starred in shows such as Detective Conan and Inazuma Eleven, sometimes using the stage name Hiromi Ueda. He published his first book, 桜塚やっくんの都市伝説工場 (Cleavage or, literally, Urban Legend Factory), in 2008.

== Controversy ==
In 2011, the Tokyo Metropolitan Police Department contacted Saitō regarding the alleged rape of a drunk college student in 2010. He denied the accusations. It was later reported that a settlement had been reached between Saitō and the woman.

== Death ==
Saitō was killed in a traffic accident on October 5, 2013, aged 37, on the Chugoku Expressway in Mine, Yamaguchi, while en route to a concert in Kumamoto Prefecture. He was hit by another car and killed when exiting his car after colliding with the median.

== Discography ==
Year	Title (K)	Title (H)	Title (E)	Album(s)	Ref
	桜...かぞえ唄	Sakura Kazoeuta	Sakura Kazoeuta	ChristMaster	
2006	&YOU	&YOU	&YOU	1000% SO Zakune?	
2006		1000% SO Zakune?	1000% SO Annoying?	1000% SO Zakune?	
2006	ロングスカート	Long Skirt	Long Skirt	Gekimajimukatsuku	
2006/2007	ゲキマジムカツク	Gekimajimukatsuku	Geki Maji Mukatsuku	SAKURA革命 & Gekimajimukatsuku	
2007	クリスマスター	ChristMaster	ChristMaster	SAKURA革命 & ChristMaster	
2007	愛の革命戦士	Aino Kakumei Senshi	Revolutionary Warrior of Love	SAKURA革命	
2007	プレイバック Part2	Play Back Part2	Play Back Part 2	SAKURA革命	
2007	KOKORO MAP	KOKORO MAP	KOKORO MAP	SAKURA革命	
2007	あせるんだ女子は いつも 目立たない君を見てる	Aserunda Joshi Wa Itsumo Medatanai Kimi Wo Miteru	I'm rushing	Aserunda Joshi Wa Itsumo Medatanai Kimi Wo Miteru	
2007	かめれおんガール	Kamereongirl	Chameleon Girl	Aserunda Joshi Wa Itsumo Medatanai Kimi Wo Miteru	
2007	あの娘ぼくがロングシュート決めたらどんな顔するだろう	Ano Musume Boku ga Rongushu to Kime Taradonna Kao Surudarou		Do Nacchattendayo	
2007	どぉなっちゃってんだよ	Do Nacchattendayo	What's Going On?	Do Nacchattendayo	
2007	怪僧ラスプーチン	Kaisou Rasputin	Rasputin	Kaisou Rasputin/Damemoto Manatsuno Love Labo Clinic	
2007	ダメモト～真夏のLOVE・LABOクリニック～	Damemoto Manatsuno Love Labo Clinic	Damemoto Summer Lovelabo Clinic	Kaisou Rasputin/Damemoto Manatsuno Love Labo Clinic	
2013	勝利		Victory	Victory/SEXY NIGHT (with Bijomen Z)	
2013	SEXY NIGHT	SEXY NIGHT	SEXY NIGHT	Victory/SEXY NIGHT (with Bijomen Z)	

== Filmography ==
Year	Type	Title (K)	Title (H)	Title (E)	Role	Notes	Ref
1996	TV show	名探偵コナン	Meitantei Konan	Detective Conan	Satan Onizuka (voice)	1 episode	
2002	TV show (short)	満月をさがして かわいいかわいい大冒険	Furu Mūn O Sagashite Kawaii Kawaii Daibōken	Full Moon O Sagashite: Cute Cute Adventure	Takuto Kira (voice)	1 episode	
2002—2003	TV show		Full Moon o Sagashite	Full Moon	Takuto Kira (voice)	52 episodes	
2005	TV show	絶対少年	Zettai shônen	Absolute Boy	Ryôsuke Sakakura (voice)	13 episodes	
2006	TV show	電車男	Densha otoko	Train Man	Yasuo	1 episode	
2007	Movie	名探偵コナン 紺碧の棺ジョリー・ロジャー	Meitantei Konan: Kon Peki no Jorī Rojā	Detective Conan: Jolly Roger in the Deep Azure	Conan Ouendan		
2007	Movie	カンフーくん	Kanfû-kun	Kung-Fu Kid	Fûjin		
2005—2008	TV show	アイシールド21	Aishīrudo Nijūichi	Eyeshield 21	Jeremy Watt, Ken Kamaguruma (voice)	12 episodes (Watt), 3 episodes (Kamaguruma)	
2008	Movie	鎧 サムライゾンビ	Yoroi Samurai Zombie	Samurai Zombie			
2008	TV show	ポルフィの長い旅	Porufi no Nagai Tabi	The Long Journey of Porphy	Leon (voice)	3 episodes	
2009	TV show	イナズマイレブン	Inazuma Irebun	Inazuma Eleven	Hijikata Raiden (voice)	45 episodes	
2009–2010	TV show	ジュエルペット	Juerupetto	Jewelpet	Aqua (voice)	7 episodes	
2010	Video game	みんなのテニスポータブル	Minna no Tenisu Pōtaburu	Hot Shot Tennis: Get a Grip	Yakkun (voice)	Japanese version	
2010	TV show	RAINBOW 二舎六房の七人	Rainbow: Nisha Rokubō no Shichinin	Rainbow: The Seven from Compound Two, Cell Six	Mickey	3 episodes	
2010–2011	TV show	ジュエルペット	Juerupetto	Jewelpet: Twinkle	Aqua (voice)	22 episodes	
2011	Short film		Itai/Omoi	Itai/Omoi	Yukio Kuki		

=== Dubbing ===
- The Cabin in the Woods (Marty Mikalski (Fran Kranz))
