= Full Moon o Sagashite =

Japanese manga series

- First tankōbon volume cover

満月を探して (Furu Mūn o Sagashite)
- Genre: Magical girl; Romance; Supernatural
- Manga
- Written by: Arina Tanemura
- Published by: Shueisha
- English publisher: AUS: Madman Entertainment; NA: Viz Media
- Imprint: Ribon Mascot Comics
- Magazine: Ribon
- Original run: January 2002 – June 2004
- Volumes: 7
- Anime television series

Full Moon
- Directed by: Toshiyuki Kato
- Produced by: Norio Yamakawa; Yoko Matsushita; Shoten Miyake
- Written by: Hiro Masaki
- Music by: Kayta Shiina; Yoshiaki Mutou
- Studio: Studio Deen
- Licensed by: NA: Viz Media (expired) AnimEigo (current)
- Original network: TXN (TV Tokyo)
- Original run: April 6, 2002 – March 29, 2003
- Episodes: 52
- icon

Full Moon o Sagashite (満月(フルムーン)をさがして, Furu Mūn o Sagashite; also titled Full Moon and Looking for Full Moon in English) is a Japanese manga series written and illustrated by Arina Tanemura. It was serialized in Shueisha's shōjo manga magazine Ribon from January 2002 to June 2004 and collected in seven tankōbon volumes.

The series was adapted into an anime television series produced by Nihon Ad Systems, which ended before the manga was completed, as well as an original video animation distributed through Ribon. The anime series was broadcast on TV Tokyo.

Viz Media acquired English distribution rights to both the manga and the anime, with the first 28 episodes of the anime released. AnimEigo acquired the North American home video rights for the anime, and is releasing the complete series in two Blu-ray sets. The previously unreleased English dubbed episodes will also be included.

== Plot ==
Twelve-year-old Mitsuki Koyama dreams of becoming a singer to reunite with her first love, Eichi Sakurai, who she met in an orphanage when they were younger. However, she is afflicted with throat sarcoma, which affects her ability to breathe well and sing loudly. Her tumor can be cured only through a surgery that could damage her vocal cords. At the same time, her grandmother is completely against Mitsuki's wish to audition. Mitsuki's dreams seem impossible to achieve until she is visited by two shinigami, Takuto and Meroko, whom only she could see. Takuto and Meroko reveal that Mitsuki has only one year left to live, and, realizing she cannot wait any longer to fulfill her dream, Mitsuki moves Takuto to agree to a compromise: if he helps her become a singer, she will allow him to take her soul once the year is over. Takuto gives her the ability to transform into a 16-year-old, so that she could meet the age requirements of the audition and sing. Mitsuki wins over the judges, sealing a contract with Seed Records. To conceal her true identity, she chooses the stage name "Full Moon".

As Mitsuki gains a presence in the music industry, she runs away from home. Over time, Mitsuki begins to become more acquainted with Takuto and Meroko, as well as Izumi, Meroko's former partner. However, Mitsuki's career causes Takuto to regain his memories as a singer who was previously part of her father's band, and that he had attempted to die by suicide after a surgery to remove his throat sarcoma left him unable to sing. Through this, Mitsuki learns that all shinigami had been humans in their previous life who had died by suicide. Later, the shinigami discover that Eichi had died shortly after leaving the orphanage, and Mitsuki had kept secret about his death out of regret for not being able to confess to him. Takuto, realizing he is in love with Mitsuki, helps her come to terms over his death.

Soon after, Mitsuki admits to Takuto that she wants to return home and decides to undergo surgery to remove her tumor. Izumi discovers Jonathan's true identity is Sheldan, the head of the shinigami pediatrics ward, who has decided to forcefully take Mitsuki's soul. Takuto and Meroko travel to the underworld; however, Mitsuki is able to free Izumi and confronts Sheldan and the Death Master. Sheldan and the Death Master reveal that ever since Mitsuki met the shinigami, she was no longer fated to die, and Eichi's soul had protected her from them. After returning, Mitsuki attends her final concert as Full Moon and retires. Four years later, Mitsuki has resumed her singing career under her true identity and holds a concert that is viewed by her friends and family. During the concert, she reunites with Takuto, who has awoken from his coma and his throat healed by Sheldan, and confesses her feelings to him. Realizing Mitsuki no longer needs him, Eichi's soul finally ascends to heaven.

== Characters ==
=== Main characters ===
Mitsuki Kōyama (神山 満月, Kōyama Mitsuki)
Voiced by: Myco (Japanese); Katie Rowan (English)
Mitsuki is a 12-year-old girl who dreams of becoming a pop singer, but she has a tumor in her vocal cords which restricts her ability to sing. With Takuto's help, she transforms into Full Moon (フルムーン, Furu Mūn), a 16-year-old idol, completely cancer-free and able to sing. Mitsuki eventually learns that Eichi died after leaving to move to America, and despite being distraught at first, Takuto helps her cope and realize that she must live her life to the fullest.
Through the series, Mitsuki realizes that she loves Takuto, but feels guilty for it because she is afraid of forgetting Eichi. Mitsuki decides that she loves both of them and confesses to Takuto, as well as accept that Eichi would like her to be happy. Near the end, her illness is cured with her being able to pursue a singing career and relationship with Takuto, but keeps Eichi in a special place in her heart.
Takuto Kira (タクト・キラ)
Voiced by: Yakkun Sakurazuka (Japanese); Jeffrey Watson (English)
Takuto is a trainee shinigami partnered with Meroko in the team Negi Ramen. Takuto is capable of transforming into an anthropomorphic cat stuffed toy. Despite being assigned to take Mitsuki's soul, he is moved by her plight and transforms her into Full Moon. Takuto falls in love with Mitsuki as the series progresses, and he remembers his past as Takuto Kira (吉良 托人, Kira Takuto), the lead singer of Route:L, the band that both Mitsuki's father and her doctor were in. After a malignant tumor in his throat took his voice, he attempted suicide and remained in a coma for the next two years. At the end of the series, Takuto saves Mitsuki's life, violating fate and his duty as a shinigami.
At the end of the manga, he is seen as a human again in the hospital, having lost three months of memories. Three years later, he reunites with Mitsuki during her concert. In the anime, he dies from a motorcycle accident, and after being given a second chance at life, Takuto is reborn as a human with no memories of his former lives, but still carries the cat charm Mitsuki gave him.
Meroko Yui (めろこ・ユイ)
Voiced by: Chieko Honda (Japanese); Leda Davies (English)
Meroko is a shinigami and Takuto's partner who is capable of transforming into an anthropomorphic bunny stuffed toy. She pines for Takuto one-sidedly, sometimes antagonizing Mitsuki due to his protectiveness over her. As a human, Meroko was named Moe Rikyō (里匡 萌, Rikyō Moe) and the best friend of Mitsuki's grandmother, Fuzuki; both fell in love with Seijuro Koga. However, Seijuro returned only Fuzuki's affections and arranged things so the two could be engaged. Fuzuki's loutish ex-fiancé was passed on to Moe, who attempted to rape her. Feeling betrayed by her friend, Moe committed suicide. Meroko eventually makes amends with Fuzuki.
In the manga, Meroko and Izumi reconcile their relationship and become shinigami partners again. In the anime, Meroko is exiled from the shinigami and resolves to become a ghost to save Takuto; in reward for this kindness, she is made into an angel and given Takuto's soul to deliver a second chance.
Izumi Rio (いずみ・リオ)
Voiced by: Megumi Ogata (Japanese); Jordan Schartner (English)
Izumi is the main antagonist of the series and he is a cold and distant shinigami assigned to the Pediatrics Ward and is part of the team Yami Nabe with Jonathan. He can transform into an anthropomorphic dog stuffed toy, but rarely does so. Izumi and Meroko originally worked together, but dissolved their partnership and reassigned her to train Takuto. Later, Izumi realizes he is in love with her and wants to reunite.
In his human life, he was a boy named Lio Izumi (泉利緒, Izumi Rio) whose mother was abusive. In an attempt to see his mother smile again, he ran onto the train tracks and was killed, later awakening as a shinigami with all of his memories. Mitsuki helps him understand his mother's feelings and he makes peace with his past. At the end of the manga, Izumi becomes Meroko's partner again and watches over Mitsuki and Takuto.

=== Recurring characters ===
Eichi Sakurai (桜井 英知, Sakurai Eichi)
Voiced by: Ryohei Kimura (Japanese); Graden Gant (English)
Eichi is Mitsuki's childhood friend and her first love. He is a kind and gentle boy, but resents the moon after being reminded about the death of his grandfather. However, after meeting Mitsuki at the orphanage, Eichi grows to love the moon again and dreams of becoming an astronomer. Before moving to America, Eichi tells Mitsuki that he loves her, but she cannot reply by the time he leaves. Shortly after leaving, he dies in a fatal accident.
At the end of the manga, Mitsuki learns that Takuto's first assignment was taking Eichi's soul, but Eichi refused to depart the world because of her. He becomes a ghost and watches over her, which gives her the power to see shinigami. He stays with her until the end, when he sees that Mitsuki is happy with her career and with Takuto.
Fuzuki Kōyama (神山 文月, Kōyama Fuzuki)
Voiced by: Kazuko Sugiyama (Japanese); Maureen Jones (English)
Fuzuki is Mitsuki's maternal grandmother who adopted Mitsuki when she was 10 years old. She hates music because she believes that it has stolen everyone she has loved. After Mitsuki runs away from home, disappearing from her life, Fuzuki gradually accepts the fact that she cannot keep Mitsuki from music, and the two reconcile.
In the manga, Fuzuki was best friends with Moe Rikyo, and they both fell in love with Seijuro Koga. He chose Fuzuki as his fiancée, but Fuzuki refused the engagement out of loyalty to Moe. She later married another man. At the end, Fuzuki reunites with a widowed Seijuro.
In the anime, Fuzuki was engaged to a man who wanted to become a famous pianist. He became obsessed with practicing the piano. When Fuzuki suggested he should rest, he ended their relationship.
Yone Tanaka (田中 よね, Tanaka Yone)
Voiced by: Mayumi Akado (Japanese); Suzette Mattar (English)
Tanaka is Fuzuki's maid. She also has a crush on Wakaoji and is jealous of Oshige, mistaking her to be Wakaōji's fiancée, but concedes when she believes the two are in love.
Keiichi Wakaōji (若王子 圭一, Wakaōji Keiichi)
Voiced by: Teruaki Ogawa (Japanese); Gerrick Winston (English)
Wakaōji is Mitsuki's doctor. He had played the keyboard in her father's band, Route:L, where he was also nicknamed the "Prince of Route:L" by his fans. Due to his connection with Mitsuki's parents, as well as witnessing Takuto committing suicide after removing the tumor in his vocal cords, Wakaōji becomes protective of her. Mitsuki learns that Wakaoji loved her mother because of a letter he thought she had written him, but Wakaōji falls in love with Ōshige when he discovers the letter was from her. In a side story, he asks Ōshige to marry him and she accepts.
Masami Ōshige (大重 正実, Ōshige Masami)
Voiced by: Tomomi Seo (Japanese); Kris Rundle (English)
Ōshige is Fullmoon's 28-year-old manager and a former singer under the stage name Yuina Hanakazari (花飾 結菜, Hanakazari Yuina). Ōshige is in love with Wakaōji, having been smitten with him since his days in Route:L, but she feels she is too old and unworthy of true love with a man. To cope with this despair as well as with the pressures of her job, she often loses herself in a bottle of sake and also sleeps with her boss out of loneliness despite his being married. At the end of the manga, Wakaōji discovers Ōshige had written an encouraging letter to him in the past, and they begin a relationship, eventually getting engaged.
"Ōshige" is a combination of Tanemura's editors names. She created Ōshige as a heavy drinker because her editors like to drink.
Madoka Wakamatsu (若松 円, Wakamatsu Madoka)
Voiced by: Kana (Japanese); Carol-Anne Day (English)
Madoka Wakamatsu, whose real name is Chisato Kurebayashi (暮林 千暁, Kurebayashi Chisato), is Fullmoon's rival in the music industry and befriends 12-year-old Mitsuki at the same time. Despite being talented, Madoka is constantly upstaged by Fullmoon because she initially lacks the heart Mitsuki gives her songs. Additionally, Madoka is insecure because she had plastic surgery to make herself beautiful as a celebrity, and thus was disowned by her family. Madoka has a small pig called Gu-chan (ぐっちゃん, Gucchan) who worships her. Although Madoka sometimes takes out her anger on Gu-chan, she really loves him.
Aoi Koga (古雅 葵, Koga Aoi)
Voiced by: Hiroki Takahashi
Aoi is Mitsuki's deceased father who was also the guitarist and songwriter for the band Route:L. He acted as a father figure for the orphaned Takuto. Tanemura states that he loves wearing Buddhist priest work clothes.
Hazuki Koga (古雅 葉月, Koga Hazuki)
Voiced by: Hiroko Kasahara (Japanese); Katie Rowan (English)
Hazuki is Mitsuki's deceased mother. Like Mitsuki, she was physically weak and often fell ill. Hazuki had loved Aoi for a long time against the wishes of her strict mother, and married him after becoming pregnant with Mitsuki. She died giving birth to her.
Nachi (那智)
Nachi is the lead singer of the duo OZ, who befriends Full Moon because she was the first person in the music industry to smile as she talked to him. He cherishes her friendship and takes it upon himself to find a stalker hurting people close to her. Nachi and Madoka fall in love, but when Madoka finds he has an old photo of her with her unattractive childhood fiancé, Sōichirō Shidō (紫堂 総一郎, Shidō Sōichirō), she assumes Nachi is Soichiro's friend, pretending to love her to get revenge for rejecting of Soichiro. After having plastic surgery to become an idol and make her love him, Nachi reveals that he is Sōichirō. At the end, they remain engaged and a happy couple.
Hikari Hayashi (林 光理, Hayashi Hikari)
Hikari was Takuto's girlfriend while he was alive. Takuto discovered that she was cheating on him and the two were on the verge of breaking up when Takuto attempted suicide and went into a coma, after which Hikari realized that she still loved him. She later sees Takuto and attempts to revive their relationship, which causes problems between Takuto and Mitsuki. Takuto later tells Mitsuki that he broke up with her.

=== Shinigami ===
The shinigami are the spirits of humans that committed suicide, who are then punished with the task of collecting souls. If a shinigami fully remembers his or her past life before becoming a full shinigami, he or she disappears and becomes a ghost to wander about.

Jonathan (ジョナサン, Jonasan)
Voiced by: Norihisa Mori (Japanese); Tommy James (English)
Jonathan is Izumi's current partner who acts whimsical at first glance. Later in the manga, secretly attempts to harm Mitsuki and reveals himself to be Sheldan (シェルダン部長, Sherudan-buchō), the head of the pediatrics ward and the second shinigami to come into existence. He attempts to take Mitsuki's life, but is stopped by Takuto, Meroko, and Izumi. In the final chapter, he uses up all his powers to heal Takuto's throat and give him his voice back, and disappears along with Mystere.
Tanemura conceived Jonathan's character design based on a sketch she drew of what she believed Peeves from Harry Potter looked like.
Death Master (死神主人, Desu Masutā)
The Death Master, also called Mystere (ミスティア, Misutia), is the first human soul to descend to the Underworld and crowned queen of the Underworld. When Meroko enters her room to erase Mitsuki's name from the rolls of the dead, Mystere gives her the keys to save Takuto. At the end of the manga, when Mystere and Sheldan disappear after using up their power healing Takuto's throat, they seem to show great affection for each other.

=== Minor characters ===
Tomoe Maejima (前島 巴, Maejima Tomoe)
Voiced by: Mariko Nagahama (Japanese); Marcy Lannan (English)
Tomoe is Mitsuki's best friend.
Kumi Sagimiya (鷺宮 クミ, Sagimiya Kumi)
Voiced by: Akiko Kobayashi
Kumi is Mitsuki and Tomoe's other friend from school who takes Judo lessons. Despite her tomboyish personality, she has romantic feelings for Mochida.
Wakana Kimura (木村 若菜, Kimura Wakana), Emi Yamano (山野 エミ, Yamano Emi), and Mayumi Hashimoto (橋本 まゆみ, Hashimoto Mayumi)
Voiced by: Naomi Orikasa (Wakana), Mika Sakenobe (Emi), and Yukiko Sawada (Mayumi) (Japanese); Jayna Mitchell (Wakana), Jasmine Berg (Emi), and Leah Dubbin-Steckel (Mayumi) (English)
Wakana, Emi, and Mayumi are classmates of Mitsuki and her friends.
Hasegawa (長谷川) and Mochida (町田)
Voiced by: Makoto Ueki (Hasegawa), Ryō Naitō (Mochida) (Japanese); Graham Ko (Hasegawa), Cole Howard (Mochida) (English)
Hasegawa is a male student in Mitsuki's class.
Taiki (大樹くん, Taiki-kun)
Voiced by: Junko Takeuchi (Japanese); Idan Wolach (English)
Taiki is an orphan attending Hiiragi Preschool (柊幼稚園, Hiiragi Yōchien) which is also an orphanage. He is a close friend of Sora, a little girl a few years younger than him who later on becomes his adopted sister.
Sora (ソーラ)
Voiced by: Umi Tenjin (Japanese); Kylie Beaven (English)
Sora is Taiki's friend who later becomes her adopted brother. She is a big fan of Full Moon and seen carrying around stuffed doll of her.
Mr. Yamane (山根先生, Yamane-sensei)
Voiced by: Hiroshi Shimozaki (Japanese); Charles Heffernan (English)
Mr. Yamane is one of Mitsuki's school teachers.

== Production ==
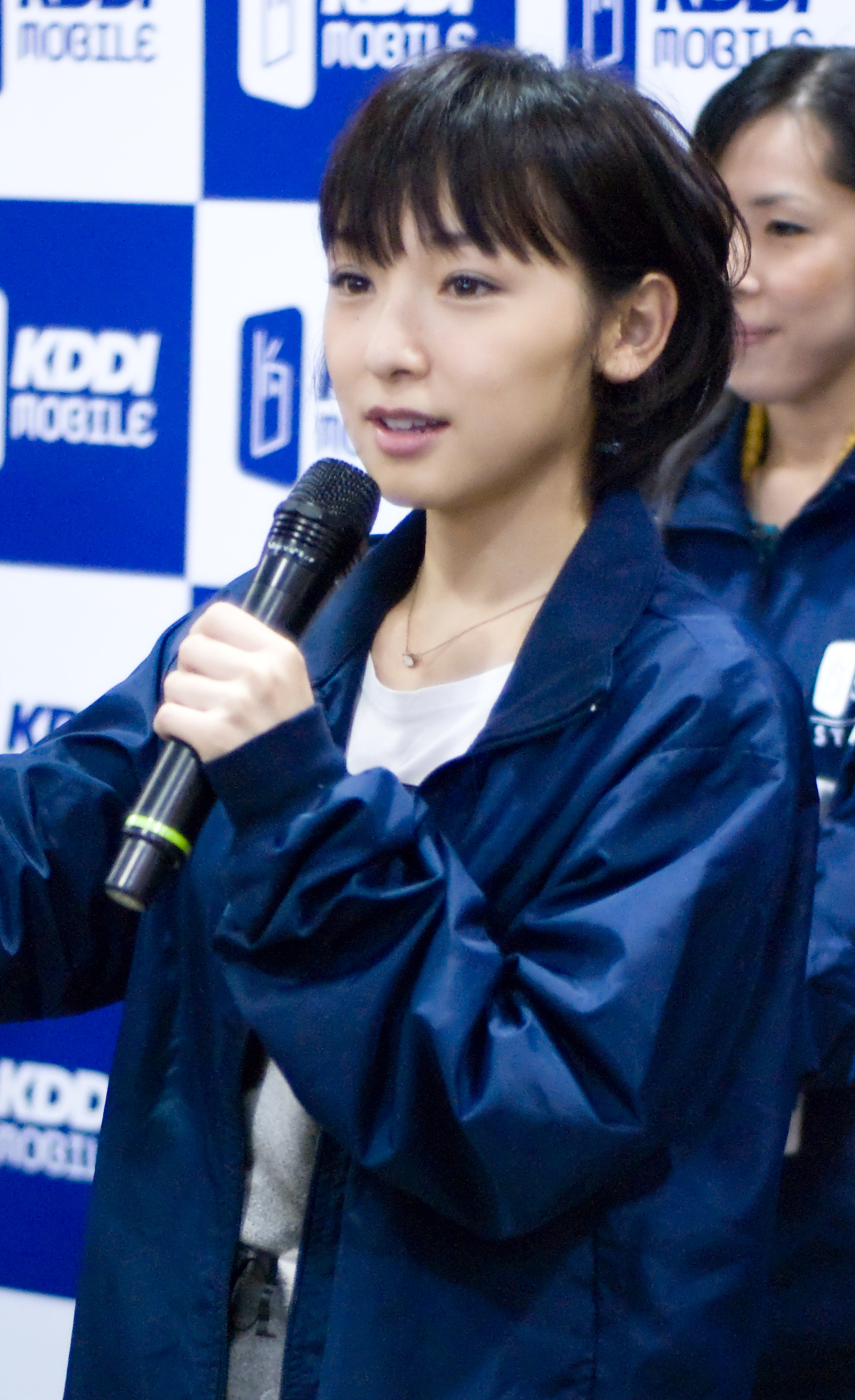
Mitsuki's character design is based on Japanese singer Ai Kago (pictured in 2009).

As a fan of idol singers, Tanemura created the series out of desire to write lyrics. Her previous series, Time Stranger Kyoko, was cut short due to the main protagonist, Kyoko, having a strong personality, which failed to appeal to her editors and reader demographic. As a result of this, Tanemura decided to give Mitsuki a more subdued personality and later had the idea of making her sickly to explain her shy behavior. Mitsuki is modeled after one of Tanemura's assistants, Airi Teito, and her corkscrew hairstyle was inspired by then-Morning Musume member Ai Kago.

== Media ==
=== Manga ===
Full Moon o Sagashite was published by Shueisha in the magazine Ribon from January 2002 to June 2004 and collected in seven tankōbon volumes under the Ribon Mascot Comics imprint. Contributing assistants to the manga were Ai Minase, Airi Teito, Akoko Asakura, Kanan Kiseki, Kayoru Asano, Konako, Kyakya Asano, Megumi Nakamura, Miwa Sawakami, Niki Seisou, Noriko Funaki, Rina Asuka, Ruka Kaduki, and Saori Hinano. Volume 2 also included an unrelated short story titled Gin-yu Meika (吟遊名華), which originally appeared in the November 2001 issue of Ribon. First-print editions of each volume came with a collectible card.

Starting in January 2012, Full Moon o Sagashite was reprinted in four bunkoban volumes with new covers. The manga is licensed in North America in English by Viz Media as Full Moon, although the full Japanese title is given on the front cover.

==== Tankōbon editions ====
No.	Original release date	Original ISBN	English release date	English ISBN
1	June 14, 2002	978-4-08-856380-0	July 5, 2005	978-1-59116-928-4
2	October 15, 2002	978-4-08-856408-1	August 23, 2005	978-1-4215-0036-2
3	March 14, 2003	978-4-08-856445-6	October 4, 2005	978-1-4215-0059-1
4	August 8, 2003	978-4-08-856483-8	December 6, 2005	978-1-4215-0125-3
5	January 15, 2004	978-4-08-856514-9	April 4, 2006	978-1-4215-0266-3
6	June 15, 2004	978-4-08-856542-2	July 5, 2006	978-1-4215-0397-4
7	July 15, 2004	978-4-08-856549-1	October 3, 2006	978-1-4215-0476-6

==== Bunkoban editions ====
No.	Japanese release date	Japanese ISBN
1	January 18, 2012	978-4086193108
2	January 18, 2012	978-4086193115
3	February 17, 2012	978-4086193122
4	February 17, 2012	978-4086193139

==== Doujinshi ====
Under the pseudonym "Meguro Teikoku", Tanemura has also self-published unofficial doujinshi of the series and sold limited copies exclusively at Comiket in August 2015.

No.	Title	Japanese release date	Japanese ISBN
1	A Kiss on the Ring of Stars; Hoshi no Yubiwa ni Kiss o Shite (星の指輪にKissをして)	August 15, 2015	—
2	Love is Melody	August 15, 2015	—

=== Anime ===
The series was adapted as a 52-episode anime television series by Studio Deen, directed by Toshiyuki Kato. It was broadcast on TV Tokyo from April 6, 2002, to March 29, 2003. Because the anime adaptation was broadcast while the manga was still ongoing, several characters have different backgrounds and personalities, and the story ended with a different resolution.

The television series was licensed by Viz Media, who released seven DVDs (the first 28 episodes), under the title Full Moon before putting further releases on indefinite hold, citing low sales potential. The English dub was provided by Blue Water Studios. The songs are subtitled only, resulting in a dub that switches between English dialogue and Japanese singing. On August 3, 2024, AnimEigo announced their license to the anime and will re-release the series on Blu-ray in 2025. They later announced that the complete Viz English dub had been recovered and would be on the Blu-ray release.

Full Moon o Sagashite has two opening themes and four ending themes. "I Love U" by The Scanty is used as the opening theme for the first 26 episodes, while the group's song "Rock 'n' Roll Princess" is used for the rest. Changin' My Life performs all four ending themes: "New Future" used for the first six episodes, episode 52, and final episode; "Myself" is used for episodes 7–26; "Eternal Snow" is used for episodes 27–42; "Love Chronicle" is used for episodes 43–51.

=== OVA ===
Full Moon o Sagashite: Cute Cute Adventure (満月をさがして かわいいかわいい大冒険, Furu Mūn O Sagashite: Kawaii Kawaii Daibōken) is a ten-minute anime OVA that was distributed with the November 2002 issue of Ribon, the magazine in which the manga was serialized. It was produced by Studio Deen. Myco and Chieko Honda reprise their respective roles of Mitsuki and Meroko from the anime, and Hiromi Ōtsuda voices Takuto. Set before the series ends, it features Takuto and Meroko trying to make their way to the studio in stuffed animal forms after Mitsuki accidentally leaves them at home while rushing to work.

=== Art book ===
On April 15, 2004, Shueisha published a seventy-page art book for the series entitled The Arina Tanemura Collection: The Art of Full Moon (満月をさがしてイラスト集種村有菜COLLECTION, Furu Mūn O Sagashite: Irasuto Shū Tanemura Arina Collection). Viz Media published an English language edition in North America on October 21, 2008.
