= 13's Reborn =

Studio album by Girugamesh
- Released: September 27, 2006
- Genre: Metalcore
- Length: 44:41
- Languages: Japanese, English
- Producers: Girugamesh, Sakura, Jack Danger

Girugamesh chronology
Goku Shohan Kata Enban (2005)	13's Reborn (2006)	Reason of Crying (2007)

Singles from 13's Reborn
- 1. "Kaisen Sengen" Released: October 27, 2004; 2. "Fukai no Yami" Released: September 14, 2005

13's Reborn is the debut album released by Girugamesh on September 27, 2006.

== Track listing ==
Disc One
No.	Title	Length
1.	"13"	1:04
2.	"Jarring Fly"	3:37
3.	"Shadan" (遮断)	3:35
4.	"Mouja no Koushin" (亡者ノ行進)	3:35
5.	"Aimai na Mikaku" (曖昧な味覚)	4:02
6.	"Robust Conviction"	4:20
7.	"Ame to Fukousha" (雨と不幸者)	4:53
8.	"Furubita Shashin" (古びた写真)	3:25
9.	"Deceived Mad Pain"	3:55
10.	"Fukai no Yami" (腐界の闇)	4:07
11.	"Owari to Mirai" (終わりと未来)	4:09
12.	"Kaisen Sengen" (開戦宣言)	4:04*

Disc Two (DVD, Limited edition only)
No.	Title	Length
1.	"Kaisen Sengen" (開戦宣言)
2.	"Owari to Mirai" (終わりと未来)

* Not on the Limited edition.

== Notes ==
- All tracks arranged by Girugamesh except for track 7 which was arranged by Sakura

== Personnel ==
- Satoshi – vocals
- Shuu – bass
- Nii – guitar
- Ryo – drums
