= Go (Girugamesh album) =

GO

Studio album by Girugamesh
- Released: January 26, 2011
- Genre: Alternative rock; nu metal; industrial rock
- Language: Japanese, English
- Label: Danger Crue
- Producer: Girugamesh & Jack Danger

Girugamesh chronology
NOW (2009)	GO (2011)	MONSTER (2013)

GO is the fifth studio album from the band Girugamesh, which was released on January 26, 2011 in Japan and on February 4 in Europe. Two editions of the album were released: a Regular Version CD and a Limited Version 2CD+DVD which includes the music videos for "COLOR [PV]" and "イノチノキ (Inochi no Ki) [PV]", a documentary, G-TRAVEL 2010 SUMMER, and a summarization of “Ura-Girugamesh” in 2010.

GO was released to various countries in Europe and to the United States during the Here we go!! world tour starting on March 5, 2011 at The Tochka in Moscow, Russia and ending on April 27, 2011 at the JAXX Night Club in Washington DC. Girugamesh has confirmed that the tour will be continuing in Japan starting on June 4, 2011 at the Hiroshima Namiki Junction in Hiroshima, Japan and ending on June 26, 2011 at the Zepp Tokyo in Tokyo, Japan.

== Track listing ==
Regular Edition

1. "Opening" - 1:30
2. "destiny" - 4:44
3. "EXIT" - 3:48
4. "MISSION CODE" - 3:36
5. "COLOR" - 4:17
6. "13 days" - 4:18
7. "Mienai kyori" - 5:22
8. "Saikai" - 5:28
9. "Calling" - 3:45
10. "Never ending story" - 4:33
11. "Inochi no Ki" - 5:07

Limited Edition

Disc 1

1. "Opening" - 1:30
2. "destiny" - 4:44
3. "EXIT" - 3:48
4. "COLOR" - 4:17
5. "MISSION CODE" - 3:36
6. "Mienai Kyori" - 5:22
7. "Saikai" - 5:28
8. "Never ending story" - 4:33
9. "Inochi no Ki" - 5:07

Disc 2 (FALL TOUR 2010 TOUR FINAL at Yokohama Bay Hall)

1. "now(intro)"
2. "bit crash"
3. "NO MUSIC NO REASON"
4. "Endless wing"
5. "suiren"
6. "CRAZY FLAG"
7. "Dance Rock Night"
8. "driving time"
9. "DIRTY STORY"
10. "Break Down"
11. "shining"
12. "arrow"

DVD:
No.	Title	Length
1.	"COLOR [PV] [Music Video]"
2.	"Inochi no Ki [PV] [Music Video]"
3.	"FALL TOUR 2010[Documentary]"
4.	"G-TRAVEL 2010 in SUMMER"
5.	"Summarizing "Ura-girugamesh" in 2010"
