= Girugamesh =

Japanese band

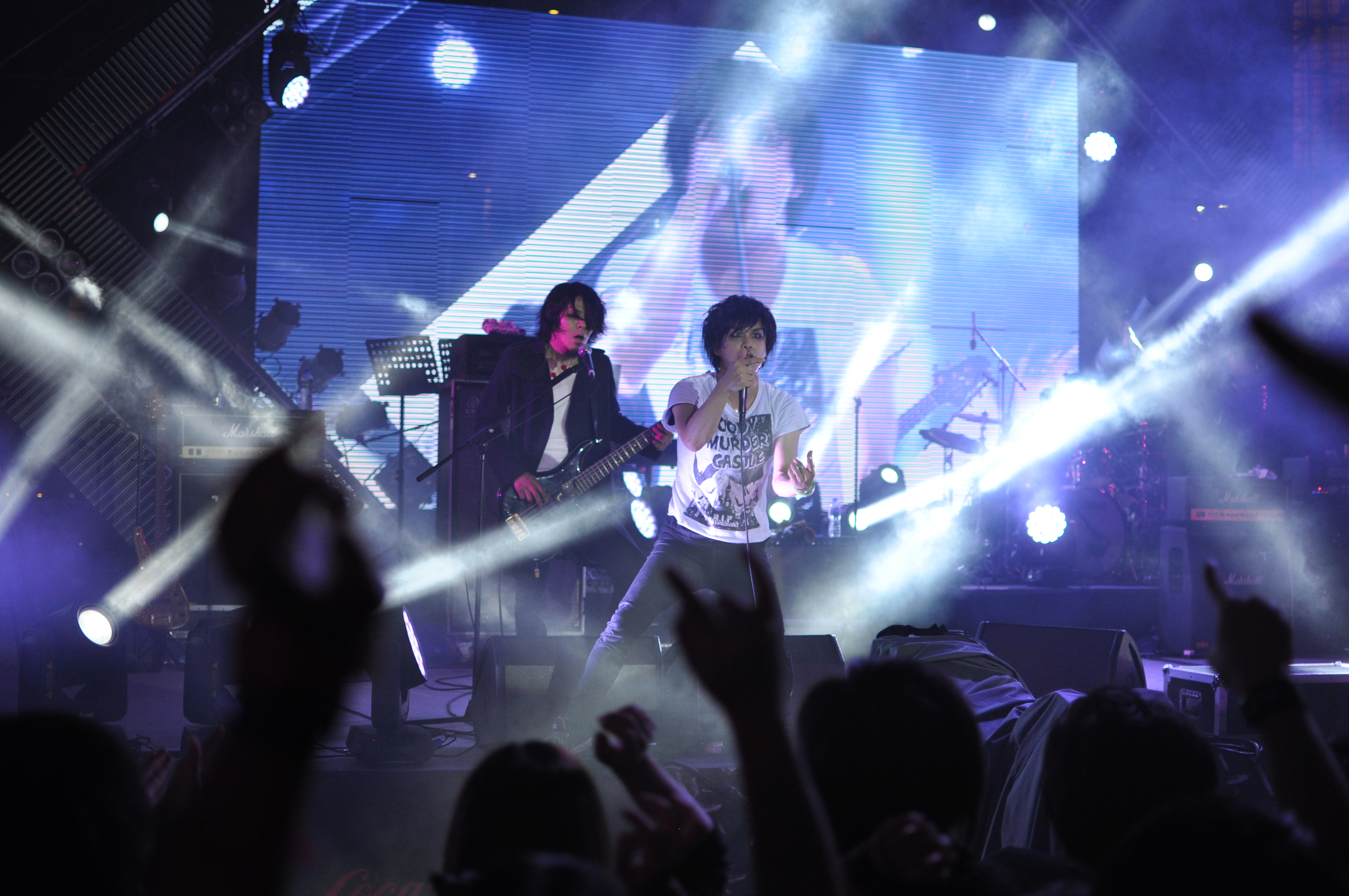
- Girugämesh at the Hush Full Band Festival in 2013

Background information
- Also known as: Girugämesh (until 2007)
- Origin: Chiba, Japan
- Genres: Nu metal; alternative rock; industrial rock; metalcore
- Years active: 2004–2016; 2022
- Labels: Danger Crue; Gan-Shin (EU)
- Members: Satoshi; Nii; Shū; Ryo
- Past members: Cyrien; Hotaru

Girugamesh (Japanese: ギルガメッシュ, Hepburn: Girugamesshu) is a Japanese rock band, formed in 2003. Their name is sometimes stylized with a metal umlaut as girugämesh and is derived from the Final Fantasy character. They disbanded in 2016, and reformed in 2022, announcing a new song to celebrate label MAVERICK's 40th anniversary as well as to encourage the music scene exhausted by COVID-19.

== History ==
=== 2003–2007: Formation ===
Formed in 2003 in Chiba, Shuu and Nii had been friends since elementary school, and the earliest incarnation of the band made its first performance while the members were still in high school. Girugamesh began playing gigs with their final lineup in 2004, and were later signed to record label Gaina-Japan. Their first single, "Kaisen Sengen" ("Declaration of War"), ranked #10 on the Oricon Indies chart. In 2005, Girugamesh embarked on a nationwide tour, after which they released their first live DVD featuring footage from the tour, followed by the EP Goku -Shohankei Enban-.

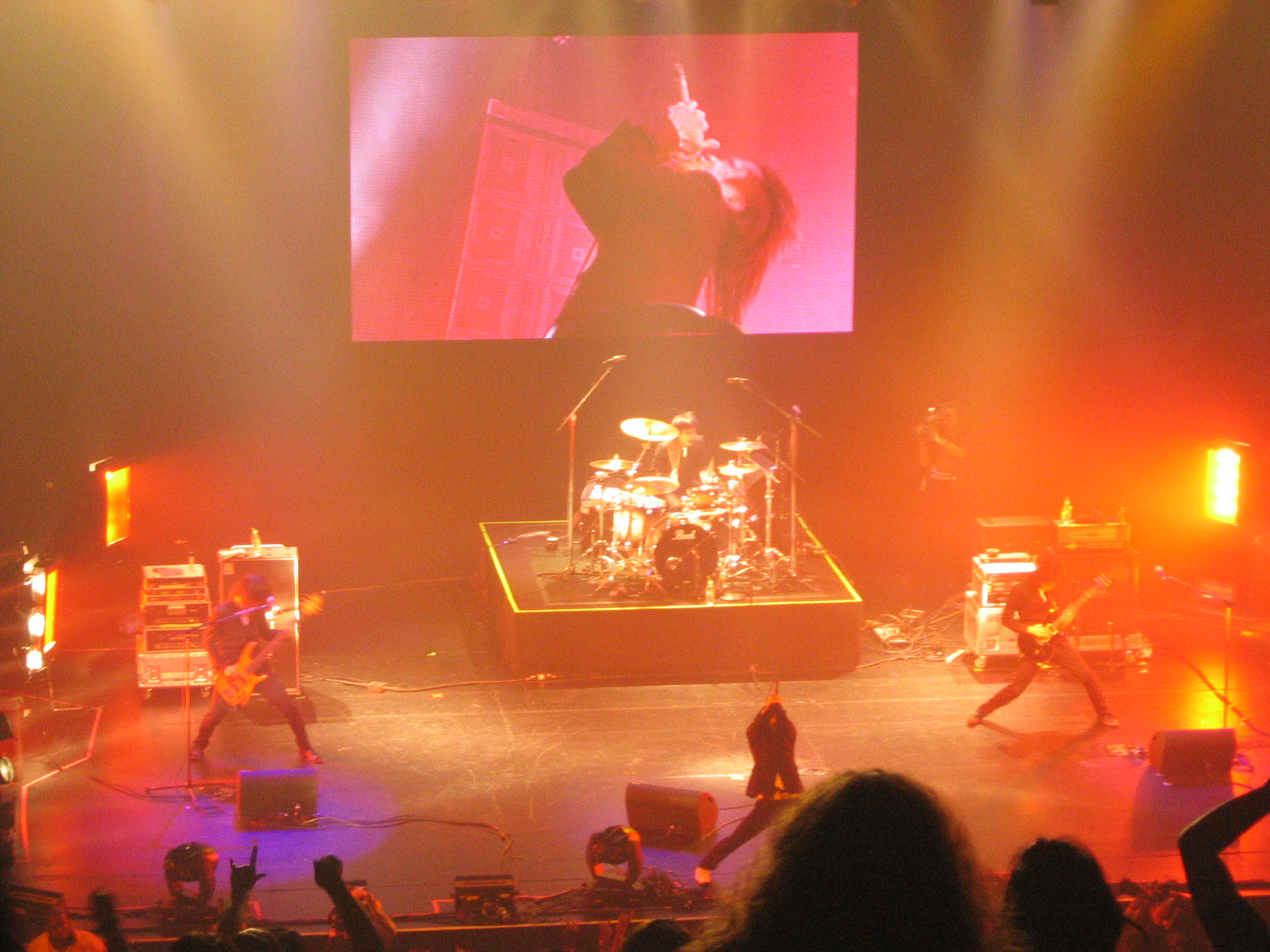
Girugamesh performing at the J-rock Revolution Festival in 2007.

In 2007, Girugamesh was signed to the European label Gan-Shin. The band then participated in the 9-band Japanese rock festival in Los Angeles, California called "J-Rock Revolution". They performed on the second night alongside Merry, D'espairsRay, and Mucc. Around the time of J-Rock Revolution, Girugamesh released their music in the iTunes Store. Ryo commented that "if you really like the band after the initial listen, you will buy the original CD." In the summer of 2007, Girugamesh released an EP entitled Reason of Crying, and in December released their eponymous album, Girugamesh.

=== 2008–2015: Girugamesh and international success ===
In 2008, in support of Girugamesh, the band toured in both Japan and Europe, under the tour title "Stupid Tour '08". The Japanese leg had Girugamesh performing throughout Japan, and later in January, the band toured Europe for the first time, visiting Germany, France, the United Kingdom, Sweden and Finland. Following their European tour, Girugamesh continued the "Stupid Tour '08 in Japan". In March, Girugamesh returned to touring visiting venues all over Japan including Okinawa.

Following a performance at Wacken Open Air, a support tour for Girugamesh will occur, entitled "Shining Tour '08". The first performances will endure through July, visiting Osaka and Nagoya, with one finale performance in August at the Liquidroom in Tokyo. Concerts in July will feature second acts, including Gelugugu, Tr. Dan, Sel'm, Dogma, and Deathgaze, while the tour finale show will be a one-man performance, with only Girugamesh.

In July 2008, an English version of their website was activated; shortly after this, the band announced they would release their debut American album, with Girugamesh being sold exclusively through Hot Topic stores. The band's third full-length album, titled Music, was released on November 5, 2008. After a lengthy Japan tour throughout the first quarter of 2009, the band made its second appearance in the United States, showcased at Sakura-Con in Seattle, Washington.

Not long after the end of "Crazy Tour 2009" they released the live DVD "Crazy Crazy Crazy" on June 3. Another release was announced to be out on July 10 but this time it was a single named "Alive" which they had been playing for the audiences during the end of their "Crazy Tour". Just a month later on August 5 the single "Border" came out along with "Crying Rain" on October 7. On December 16 they released the fourth album with the name Now and this will be the name of their tour in 2010.

The band had a live album release, Premium Oneman Show 2010, on January 31, 2010 at Shinkiba Studio Coast, and at the same time, the members tweeted in real time through musicJAPANplus before the live began.

Girugamesh released the single "Color" on July 6, 2010. On October 7 they released the single "Inochi no Ki". On September 19, 2010, the band performed at D'erlanger's "Abstinence's Door #005" with Head Phones President and Defspiral. The concert was streamed worldwide live on Ustream.tv.

On January 26, 2011, Girugamesh released their album Go which includes their recent singles, "Color" and "Inochi no Ki", one of the songs, "Destiny", leaked out a few days before. Go will be released in Europe on February 2, 2012. On April 22, 2011, Girugamesh played a concert at Anime Boston 2011.

In November 2013, Girugamesh released an album titled "Monster" and performed at the Hush!! Full Band Festival in Macau as headlining act.

In September 2014, Girugamesh released a mini-album titled "Gravitation".

In February 2016, Girugamesh released a mini-album titled "chimera". The title alludes to the band's image as it is today : a chimera being an hybrid creature just like the band's music as Ryo says in French interview "The sound of girugmesh is a mixture of different types of music." The artcover has been designed by singer Satoshi who depicted an egg and fire: "The artcover of ‘chimera’ represents an egg from which an hybrid creature, a chimera, comes out. The chimera symbolizes metaphorically the band. The split created when the monster comes out reveals fire. And fire usually alludes to passions, anger and rage. Rage is the key-word of the concept of ‘chimera’. It's Satoshi's idea. He's the one who designed it."

Girugamesh had toured in Europe in May 2016.

=== 2016: Final performance and disbandment ===
On May 2, 2016, girugamesh announced on their public Facebook page that they would be disbanding following their final show at Zepp DiverCity in Tokyo on July 10, 2016. Although no specific reason was given, girugamesh has said that they are thankful for the many years they have been together, and for all their fan support. For girugamesh's final concert, the four band members performed for 3 hours and played over 35 songs. During the show, a sneak peek video revealing the release of a DVD box collector was shown on screen as announced on French media VerdamMnis Magazine: ″The box will include the farewell performance, which at the moment was simply outstanding, it will span the career of the band from its debut and will also contain exclusive footage from its very last tour which occurred in Europe in May of 2016″.

On November 23, 2020, Satoshi revealed in an Instagram post some specifics leading to Girugamesh's disbandment. He revealed that the band was "once out of action" and that there many reasons to it including being unable to communicate or make music. In response while having his own band around the time, "REDMAN", made his own song "CHALLENGE the GAME". This song was used as the sixth ending of the Yu-Gi-Oh Zexal anime. He created REDMAN because he wanted "sell a fight to Girugamesh" and thought of wanting to come back. After the song's release, he received negative letters from fans for creating his own music. However, he discarded those letters and ended the post that the band was going nowhere and that he wanted to provoke a change in the band's direction.

=== 2021–present: New announcement for 2022, and comeback ===
On Dec 27, 2021, Girugamesh posted a short video on their Twitter account after several years of inactivity. The same video was posted to the MAVERICK DC GROUP YouTube channel. The video contained a somewhat vague message, containing mentions of the 40th anniversary of MAVERICK DC GROUP, the parent company of their record label, COVID-19, and most notably, the date February 1, 2022.

On January 30, 2022, Girugamesh announced they were releasing a new song titled "engrave" on February 1, 2022.

== Popular culture ==
The band was mentioned in a 2009 Sakura-Con commercial directed by Vic Mignogna wherein several people excitedly discuss their love of Japan-related material and a man exclaims "Girugamesh!" It later became an internet meme and went viral.

== Band members ==
Current members

- Satoshi Ishikawa (左迅) – lead vocals, lyricist (2003–2016, 2022)
- Nii (弐) – guitars (2003–2016, 2022)
- Shū (愁) – bass, leader, backing vocals (2003–2016, 2022)
- Яyo (亮) – drums, primary songwriter (2003–2016, 2022)

Former members

- Cyrien – vocals (2003, went on to play in Sel'm)
- Hotaru – guitars (2003–2004)

== Discography ==
Albums

- 13's Reborn (September 27, 2006)
- Girugämesh (December 26, 2007)
- Music (November 5, 2008)
- Now (December 16, 2009)
- Go (January 26, 2011)
- Monster (November 27, 2013)

EPs

- Goku: Shohan Gata Enban (May 25, 2005)
- Reason of Crying (July 18, 2007)
- Gravitation (September 24, 2014)
- Chimera (January 20, 2016)

Singles

- "Jelato" (August 3, 2004, distributed single)
- "Midnight" (2004, distributed single)
- "Kaisen Sengen: Kikaku Kata Enban" (August 15, 2004)
- "Sakaurami" (August 24, 2004)
- "Kuukyo no Utsuwa: Kyosaku Gata Enban" (December 25, 2004)
- "Kosaki Uta: Kaijou Gata Enban" (February 8, 2005)
- "Senyuu Kyoutou Uta" (split CD with Marusa, April 20, 2005)
- "Kyozetsu Sareta Tsukue: Tandoku Gata Enban" (June 17, 2005)
- "Fukai no Yami: Mayosake Gata Enban" (September 14, 2005)
- "Honnou Kaihou: Kakusei Gata Enban" (November 30, 2005)
- "Risei Kairan: Ranchou Gata Enban" (November 30, 2005)
- "Rei: Mukei Gata Enban" (April 5, 2006)
- "Omae ni Sasageru Minikui Koe" (April 12, 2006)
- "Volcano" (DVD single, March 14, 2007)
- "Alive" (June 10, 2009)
- "Border" (August 5, 2009)
- "Crying Rain" (October 7, 2009)
- "Color" (July 7, 2010)
- "Inochi no Ki" (イノチノキ)(October 6, 2010)
- "Pray" (Japanese and English versions) (April 13, 2011)
- "Zetchou Bang!!" (July 4, 2012)
- "Zantetsuken" (September 26, 2012)
- "Incomplete" (September 11, 2013)
- "Period" (July 10, 2016)
- "engrave" (February 2, 2022)

Compilations

- Live Best (March 26, 2014)
- Core Best (2014, Sold only at concerts)

Demos

- Dekiai: Shisaku Gata Enban (2003)

DVDs

- Crazy Crazy Crazy June 3, 2009
- Gaisen Kouen Chiba February 22, 2012
