= The Scanty =

Japanese musical group

The Scanty (stylized as THE★SCANTY) was a Japanese girls pop-rock band formed in Tokyo in October 2001. They disbanded in October 2003. Futami and Akane formed their own band, Plink?. They performed the two opening themes for the anime series Full Moon o Sagashite and also made cameo appearances in the show.

== Members ==
- Yoppy (Yoshiko Yamamoto)

The vocalist. Born on October 05, 1980, in Osaka.

- Akane

Bass. From Chiba, born on January 20, 1978.

- Futami

Guitar. From Tokyo, born on July 5, 1978.

- To-Bu

Drums. From Tochigi, born on July 17, 1973.

== Discography ==
=== Singles ===
- "レディースナイト" (TOCT-4324) [10/17/2001], contains:
1. レディースナイト (Ladies Night)
2. ラブレターヒストリー (Love Letter History)
3. レディースナイト (Instrumental)
4. ラブレターヒストリー (Instrumental)
- "Home Girl" (TOCT-4350) [01/30/2002], contains:
1. Home Girl
2. Waist
3. Home Girl (Instrumental)
- "I Heart U" (TOCT-4396) [07/10/2002], contains:
1. I Heart U
2. FCG Super Remix
3. I Heart U (Instrumental)
- "コイバナ" (TOCT-4418) [09/26/2002], contains:
1. コイバナ (Koibana)
2. Rock'N Roll Princess
3. コイバナ (Instrumental)
4. Rock'N Roll Princess (Instrumental)
- "Loveララバイ" (TOCT-4453) [02/26/2003], contains:
1. Love ララバイ (Love Lullaby)
2. True Romance
3. Love ララバイ (Instrumental)
4. True Romance (Instrumental)
- "マバタキ (Hippo's Blink Edit)" (YRCN-10018) [08/06/2003], contains:
1. マバタキ (Hippo's Blink Edit) (Mabataki (Hippo's Blink Edit))
2. One Girl
3. マバタキ (Hippo's Blink Edit) (Instrumental)

=== Albums ===
- For Cherry Girls (TOCT-24735) [03/20/2002], contains:
1. Home Girl
2. Promise List
3. レディースナイト (Ladies Night)
4. ウサミツ (Usamitsu)
5. Waist (Album Mix)
6. I Heart U
7. ラブレターヒストリー (Album Mix)
8. Chocolate Day
- Four Lucky Girls (TOCT-24972) [03/26/2003], contains:
1. One Girl
2. Love ララバイ (Love Lullaby)
3. PP
4. Lucky 8
5. Horoscope
6. コイバナ (Koibana)
7. Voice March
8. マバタキ (Mabataki)

=== DVD ===
- The 1st (TOBF-5129) [03/26/2003], contains:
1. レディースナイト (Ladies Night)
2. Home Girl
3. I Heart U
4. コイバナ (Koibana)
5. Love ララバイ (Love Lullaby)
