= Girugamesh (album) =

Studio album by Girugamesh
- Released: (Japan) 26 December 2007 (Europe) 25 January 2008
- Recorded: Bazooka Studio; Tokyo, Japan; 2007
- Genres: Nu metal; alternative metal
- Length: 34:20 (Limited edition); 43:59 (Regular edition); 56:02 (European edition)
- Languages: Japanese, English
- Labels: Danger Crue (Japan); Gan-Shin (Europe)
- Producers: Girugamesh; Jack Danger; Miya (Mucc); Masahiro Oishi

Girugamesh chronology
Reason of Crying (2007)	Girugamesh (2007)	Music (2008)

Alternative cover
- Limited edition cover

Girugamesh is the self-titled second album from the band Girugamesh, released on December 26, 2007. A limited and a regular edition were released, with different contents, as well as a European release featuring three extra tracks from the band's previous EP, Reason of Crying. The regular edition, including thirteen tracks, was released on iTunes simultaneously with the Japanese release. The limited edition included only ten songs on the feature disc, but was supplemented with a DVD with two music videos for "Vermillion" and "Kowareteiku Sekai", and backstage footage.

== Music ==
The album features a notably heavier sound than their previous album, with a more "aggressive, destructive, and power" sound. Drummer Ryo comments that during touring, the band felt as if "there was something missing in our [Girugamesh's] songs", and the band "wanted to make our songs a little bit harder with an "edge." The band collaborated on "Patchwork", "Stupid" and "Crazy-Flag" with label-mates Tatsurou and Miya of Mucc, and with Miya as the co-producer for the album.

Composition on Girugamesh is fairly consistent with other albums, with the lyrics being written by vocalist Satoshi, and most of the music being written by drummer Ryo, with minimal music composed by Nii and Shuu. The lyrics in the album are often about controversial subjects such as war and hatred. The lyricist, Satoshi, has stated that his lyrics were often written on tour and the "main inspirations are from situations and human relationships me". The music, being mainly composed by Ryo, was often produced when "sit[ting] around at home playing piano, guitar or programming some drum sequences," and the intention was to "make the songs shorter and more efficient" with the heavy sound.

== Touring ==
Stupid Tour '08 ("in Japan", "in Euro", and "Girugamesh Vs Roach")

Stupid Tour '08 in Japan

- January 11 – Shimokitazawa Era (Tokyo)
- January 12 – Shimokitazawa Era (Tokyo)
- January 13 – Shimokitazawa Era (Tokyo)

Stupid Tour '08 in Euro

- January 24 – Georg Elser Halle (Munich, Germany)
- January 26 – Zeche (Bochum, Germany)
- January 27 – La Locomotive (Paris, France)
- January 29 – Carling Academy Islington (London, England)
- January 31 – Klubben (Stockholm, Sweden)
- February 2 – Tavastia Club (Helsinki, Finland)

Stupid Tour '08 in Japan (Continued)

- February 7 – Route 14 (Motoyawata)
- February 9 – Sunash (Shizuoka)
- February 10 – Hamamatsu Force (Hamamatsu)
- February 12 – HeartLand Studio (Nagoya)
- February 13 – Club Chaos (Yokkaichi)
- February 15 – Kyoto Muse (Kyoto)
- February 16 – Kobe Varit (Kobe)
- February 18 – Crazy Mama 2nd Room (Okayama)
- February 19 – Belier (Yonago)
- February 21 – Drum Be-7 (Nagasaki)
- February 23 – Drum Be-9 (Kumamoto)
- February 24 – Drum Son (Fukuoka)
- February 26 – Live Rise (Shunan)

Stupid Tour '08 Girugamesh Vs Roach

- March 1 – Cyber Box (Naha, Okinawa)
- March 2 – Music Showa Session (Yamagata)
- March 4 – Club Junk Box Mini (Niigata)
- March 6 – Junk Box (Nagano)
- March 7 – AZ Hall (Kanazawa)
- March 9 – Kazoo Hall (Yamanashi)
- March 10 – Apollo Theater (Nagoya)
- March 12 – Osaka Muse (Osaka)
- March 14 – Takamatsu Dime (Takamatsu)
- March 15 – Cross Point (Kōchi)
- March 16 – Salon Kitty (Matsuyama)
- March 18 – Namiki Junction (Hiroshima)
- March 19 – Eurus (Matsue)
- March 26 – Kraps Hall (Sapporo)

In support of Girugamesh, the band toured in both Japan and Europe, under the tour title "Stupid Tour '08"; the tour is named after the "stupid" amount of tour dates, surpassing forty, rather than the song from the album. The Japanese leg had Girugamesh performing a series of one-man lives (i.e. only Girugamesh performing) throughout Japan. Later in January, Girugamesh toured Europe for the first time, visiting Germany, France, the United Kingdom, Sweden and Finland. Following their European tour, Girugamesh continued the "Stupid Tour '08 in Japan", followed by a short pause. In March, Girugamesh returned with a two-man tour with fellow Japanese band Roach, visiting venues all over Japan including Okinawa.

Shining Tour '08

Shining Tour '08 [Shooting Summer]

- July 4 – Osaka Knave (with Gelugugu, Osaka)
- July 5 – Osaka Knave (with Tr. Dan, Osaka)
- July 6 – Osaka Knave (with Sel'm, Osaka)
- July 22 – Nagoya HeartLand (with Dogma, Nagoya)
- July 23 – Nagoya HeartLand (with Tr. Dan, Nagoya)
- July 24 – Nagoya HeartLand (with Deathgaze, Nagoya)
- August 16 – Liquidroom Ebisu (Ebisu, Tokyo)

Following a performance at Wacken Open Air, the second support tour will occur, entitled "Shining Tour '08". The first performances begin in July, under the name "Shining Tour '08 [Shooting Summer]". The Japanese tour will endure through July, visiting Osaka and Nagoya, with one finale performance in August at the Liquidroom in Tokyo. Concerts in July will feature second acts, including Gelugugu, Tr. Dan, Sel'm, Dogma, and Deathgaze, while the tour finale show will be a one-man performance, with only Girugamesh.

== Track listing ==
=== Regular edition ===
All lyrics are written by Satoshi.

Disc one
No.	Title	Music	Length
1.	"Intro"	N/A	1:38
2.	"Patchwork"	Ryo	3:24
3.	"Vermillion"	Ryo	3:10
4.	"Stupid"	Ryo	1:44
5.	"Barricade" (バリケード)	Ryo	2:54
6.	"Shining"	Ryo	3:54
7.	"Shiroi Ashiato" (白い足跡)	Shuu	4:07
8.	"Crazy-Flag"	Ryo	3:35
9.	"'Shoujo A'" (｢少女A｣)	Ryo	3:01
10.	"Rocker's"	Nii	3:17
11.	"Dance Rock Night"	Shuu	2:59
12.	"Domino" (ドミノ)	Ryo	3:50
13.	"Kowareteiku Sekai" (壊れていく世界)	Ryo	6:30
14.	"Real My Place" (European edition only)	Ryo	3:47
15.	"Crime" (Crime -罪-, European edition only)	Ryo	4:03
16.	"Freesia" (フリージア, European edition only)	Nii	4:23

=== Limited edition ===
All lyrics are written by Satoshi.

Disc one (CD)
No.	Title	Music	Length
1.	"Intro"	N/A	1:38
2.	"Patchwork"	Ryo	3:24
3.	"Vermillion"	Ryo	3:10
4.	"Stupid"	Ryo	1:44
5.	"'Shoujo A'" (｢少女A｣)	Ryo	3:01
6.	"Crazy-Flag"	Ryo	3:35
7.	"Shining"	Ryo	3:54
8.	"Shiroi Ashiato" (白い足跡)	Shuu	4:07
9.	"Rocker's"	Nii	3:17
10.	"Kowarete Iku Sekai" (壊れていく世界)	Ryo	6:30

Disc two (DVD)
No.	Title	Length
1.	"Vermillion" (music video)	3:24
2.	"Kowareteiku Sekai" (music video)	6:06

== Personnel ==
The following are all credited individuals cooperating in this album's creation.

- Satoshi Nakamoto – vocals, lyricist
- Nii – guitar, composer
- ShuU – bass guitar, composer
- Яyo – drums, composer
- Tatsurou (Mucc) – chorus vocals ("Patchwork")
- Miya (Mucc) – chorus vocals ("Stupid", "Crazy-Flag"), co-producer
- Masahiro Oishi – executive producer
- Tetsuya Tochigi – recording, mixing
- Makoto Toonosu – mastering
- Tomoya Sakurai – art director
- Severin Schweiger – photographer
- Taro Otani – "soul advisor"
