= Kuchiki no Tō =

Studio album by Mucc
- Released: September 1, 2004
- Genre: Alternative metal; grunge; nu metal
- Length: 68:53
- Label: Danger Crue

Mucc chronology
Zekū (2003)	Kuchiki no Tō (2004)	Hōyoku (2005)

Singles from Kuchiki no Tō
- 1. "Rojiura Boku to Kimi e" Released: February 25, 2004; 2. "Monokuro no Keshiki" Released: June 9, 2004

Kuchiki no Tō (朽木の灯; literally "Light of the Decaying Tree" (Note: The Japanese titles of the album, the instrumental track 1, and track 15 are all romanized as "Kuchiki no Tō". However, track 15 is written with a different kanji, and thus means "Tower of the Decaying Tree".)) is the fourth studio album by Japanese rock band Mucc, released on September 1, 2004, by Danger Crue Records. A European version was released on September 12, 2005, by Gan-Shin. The album reached number 19 on the Oricon Albums Chart.

== Overview ==
Guitarist and principal songwriter Miya said that prior to Zekū (2003) and Kuchiki no Tō (2004), his lyrics were about past events and "traumas" he experienced, but with these two albums he wrote about present inner feelings within the band. Despite audiences loving the shows, he seems to regret having done this as he speculated that he drank a lot on those tours so he would not have to face what he was expressing on stage, and stated that there is one song on Kuchiki no Tō that he will no longer play. Gan-Shin, who released the album in Europe, reported this song to be "Kuchiki no Tō".

Mucc released Kuchiki no Tō Live at Roppongi, a live album where they perform Kuchiki no Tō in its entirely, on October 31, 2004. The songs "Namonaki Yume" and "Monokuro no Keshiki" were re-recorded by the band for their 2017 self-cover album Koroshi no Shirabe II: This is Not Greatest Hits.

== Reception ==
Kuchiki no Tō reached number 19 on the Oricon Albums Chart. Kerrang! included it on a list of 13 essential Japanese rock and metal albums. Describing it as dripping with insatiable angst and menace, Jamie Cansdale wrote that "Mucc ripped their soul from their chests with their fourth outing. An unapologetically bleak tour-de-force of melancholia, Kuchiki no Tō tapped into an inner darkness, hellbent on implosion, and channelled it through Tatsurou's tragically ravishing shrieks." He also wrote that, although Mucc later reached international success with a "more optimistic outlook", they have rarely topped the emotional rollercoaster that is Kuchiki no Tō.

The songs "Akatsuki Yami" and "Oboreru Sakana" were covered by Sid and Gibkiy Gibkiy Gibkiy respectively, for the 2017 Mucc tribute album Tribute of Mucc -En-.

== Track listing ==
No.	Title	Lyrics	Music	Length
1.	"Kuchiki no Tō" (朽木の灯)		Miya	2:03
2.	"Daremo Inai Ie" (誰も居ない家)	Tatsuro	Miya	3:50
3.	"Isho" (遺書)	Miya	Miya	5:16
4.	"Mikan no Kaiga" (未完の絵画)	Miya	Miya	5:43
5.	"Dakkū" (濁空)	Miya	Miya	2:25
6.	"Gentō Sanka" (幻燈讃歌)	Miya	Miya	3:38
7.	"Akatsuki Yami" (暁闇)	Tatsuro	Yukke	5:27
8.	"2.07"		Miya	2:07
9.	"Garo" (ガロ)	Tatsuro	Miya	3:00
10.	"Kanashimi no Hate" (悲シミノ果テ)	Miya	Miya	4:12
11.	"Rojiura Boku to Kimi e" (路地裏 僕と君へ)	Tatsuro	Miya	4:22
12.	"Oboreru Sakana" (溺れる魚)	Tatsuro	Tatsuro	5:24
13.	"Namonaki Yume" (名も無き夢)	Tatsuro	Miya	4:24
14.	"Monokuro no Keshiki" (モノクロの景色)	Tatsuro	Yukke, Miya	5:35
15.	"Kuchiki no Tō" (朽木の塔)	Tatsuro	Miya	11:27 (Note: Track 15 ends at 8:00, and is followed by 3 minutes and 27 seconds of silence.)
Total length:				68:53
