= Inochi no Ki =

EP by Girugamesh
- Released: October 6, 2010
- Genre: Alternative metal, rock
- Length: 12:35
- Label: Danger Crue Records

Girugamesh chronology
'Color' (2010)	Inochi no Ki (2010)	'Pray' (2011)

"Inochi no Ki" is the 19th single released by the Japanese visual kei band, Girugamesh, on October 6, 2010.

== Track listing ==
No.	Title	Length
1.	"Inochi no Ki" (イノチノキ)	5:08
2.	"Vision"	3:28
3.	"Endless Wing"	3:59
Total length:		12:35

== Personnel ==
- Satoshi – all vocals
- Shuu – guitar
- Nii – bass
- Яyo – drums
