= Now (Girugamesh album) =

NOW

Studio album by Girugamesh
- Released: December 16, 2009
- Genre: Alternative rock; nu metal; industrial rock
- Language: Japanese, English
- Label: Danger Crue
- Producer: Girugämesh & Jack Danger

Girugamesh chronology
Music (2008)	NOW (2009)	GO (2011)

NOW is the fourth studio album from the band Girugamesh, released on December 16, 2009 in Japan, January 4, 2010 in the United States and on February 12 in Europe. Three editions of the album were released: a Regular Version CD, a Limited Version CD+DVD, and a Super Limited Version CD+DVD which includes the music videos for "Alive [PV]" and "Border [PV]", G-TRAVEL Footage, a documentary, and an interview about the album.

== Track listing ==
Regular Edition

1. "NOW [Intro]" 1:40
2. "bit crash" 2:22
3. "NO MUSIC, NO REASON" 3:41
4. "ALIVE" 4:46
5. "I think I can fly" 3:39
6. "BEAST" 3:14
7. "nobody" 3:44
8. "Suiren" (睡蓮) 3:52
9. "DIRTY STORY" 3:30
10. "GAME" 3:43
11. "driving time" 3:57
12. "arrow" 4:10

Limited Edition

1. "NOW [Intro]" 1:40
2. "bit crash" 2:22
3. "NO MUSIC, NO REASON" 3:41
4. "I think I can fly" 3:39
5. "BEAST" 3:14
6. "nobody" 3:44
7. "Suiren" (睡蓮) 3:52
8. "DIRTY STORY" 3:30
9. "arrow" 4:10

DVD:
No.	Title	Length
1.	"arrow [PV] [Music Video]"
2.	"DIRTY STORY [PV] [Music Video]"

Super Limited Edition

1. "NOW [Intro]" 1:40
2. "bit crash" 2:22
3. "NO MUSIC, NO REASON" 3:41
4. "ALIVE" 4:46
5. "I think I can fly" 3:39
6. "BEAST" 3:14
7. "nobody" 3:44
8. "Suiren" (睡蓮) 3:52
9. "DIRTY STORY" 3:30
10. "arrow" 4:10
11. "GOKU" 3:32
12. "GOKUSOU [NOW]" 3:49

DVD:
No.	Title	Length
1.	"ALIVE [PV] [Music Video]"
2.	"BORDER [PV] [Music Video]"
3.	"G-TRAVEL Footage"
4.	"SUMMER EVOLUTION [Documentary]"
5.	"Interview about the album"

European Edition

1. "NOW [intro]" 1:40
2. "bit crash" 2:22
3. "NO MUSIC, NO REASON" 3:41
4. "ALIVE" 4:46
5. "I think I can fly" 3:39
6. "BEAST" 3:14
7. "nobody" 3:44
8. "Suiren" (睡蓮) 3:52
9. "DIRTY STORY" 3:30
10. "GAME" 3:43
11. "driving time" 3:57
12. "arrow" 4:10
13. "BORDER" 3:31
14. "Crying Rain" 4:57
