= Music (Girugamesh album) =

Studio album by Girugamesh
- Released: November 5, 2008
- Genre: Industrial rock; nu metal
- Language: Japanese, English
- Label: Danger Crue
- Producer: Girugämesh & Jack Danger

Girugamesh chronology
Girugamesh (2007)	Music (2008)	NOW (2009)

Music (typeset as MUSIC) is the third studio album of the band Girugamesh, released on November 5, 2008 in Japan and US, and in some European countries between November 5 to 11. Limited and a regular editions were released with different contents, as well as a European release featuring three extra tracks from their previously released, Japan-only EP Reason of Crying.

The album reached No. 36 on the Oricon Albums Chart.

== Track listing ==
No.	Title	Length
1.	"-Intro-"	1:07
2.	"Break Down"	3:27
3.	"Ultimate 4"	2:54
4.	"Freaks"	3:04
5.	"Angry juice" (アングリージュース Angurī Jūsu)	3:06
6.	"evolution"	3:55
7.	"-Inst.-" (regular editions only)	1:17
8.	"puzzle" (regular editions only)	2:51
9.	"Asking why" (regular editions only)	3:03
10.	"Dead World"	3:30
11.	"Ishtar" (イシュタル Ishutaru)	3:31
12.	"enishi" (縁enishi)	3:18
13.	"smash!!" (European edition only)
14.	"Melody" (European edition only)
15.	"Omaeni sasageru minikui koe" (European edition only)

Disc two (DVD)
No.	Title	Length
1.	"Shining Tour'08 "Shooting Summer" at Liquidroom"
2.	"Shining Tour'08 Highlights"
3.	"Wacken Open Air '08"
4.	"Ura Girugamesh" (backstage footage)
5.	"Break Down" (music video)

== Personnel ==
- Satoshi – vocals
- Nii – guitar
- Shuu – bass guitar
- Яyo – drums, programming
