= Myco (singer) =

Japanese singer, voice actress, and radio personality

- Born: February 27, 1979 (age 47)
- Origin: Shinjuku, Tokyo, Japan
- Genres: J-pop
- Occupations: Singer, voice actress
- Instrument: Vocals
- Years active: 2001–2004, 2007–present
- Website: myco27.com

Myco (born February 27, 1979, in Shinjuku, Tokyo) is a Japanese singer, voice actress, and radio personality.

She was the vocalist for the band Changin' My Life, which was formed in 2001 and disbanded in 2003. She was the voice actor for the main character of the hit anime Full Moon o Sagashite, Mitsuki Kouyama, and the band did the music for the show.

She has released one full solo album. She was on a hiatus between 2004 and 2007.

On January 12, 2008, she joined a rock band called Quintillion Quiz with Ju-ken (bass) and Masanori Mine (guitar).

== Solo discography ==
=== Singles ===
Title	Release date
"Mata Koi Shiyō" (また恋しよう)	February 18, 2004
"Hibari"	July 28, 2004

=== Albums ===
- My-Collage [TOCT-25360] (August 18, 2004)
1. "Lily (El viajero blanco y puro)"
2. "Da Capo"
3. "Hibari"
4. "Mata Koi Shiyō" (また恋しよう)
5. "赤い糸" (Akai Ito)
6. "Maldives"
7. "Dear A Friend"
8. "Confession"
9. "Christmas ni Kuchizuke o" (クリスマスにくちづけを)
10. "Your Song"
11. "Milktea" (ミルクティー)
