= Kanon Wakeshima discography =

Discography of Japanese singer and cellist Kanon Wakeshima

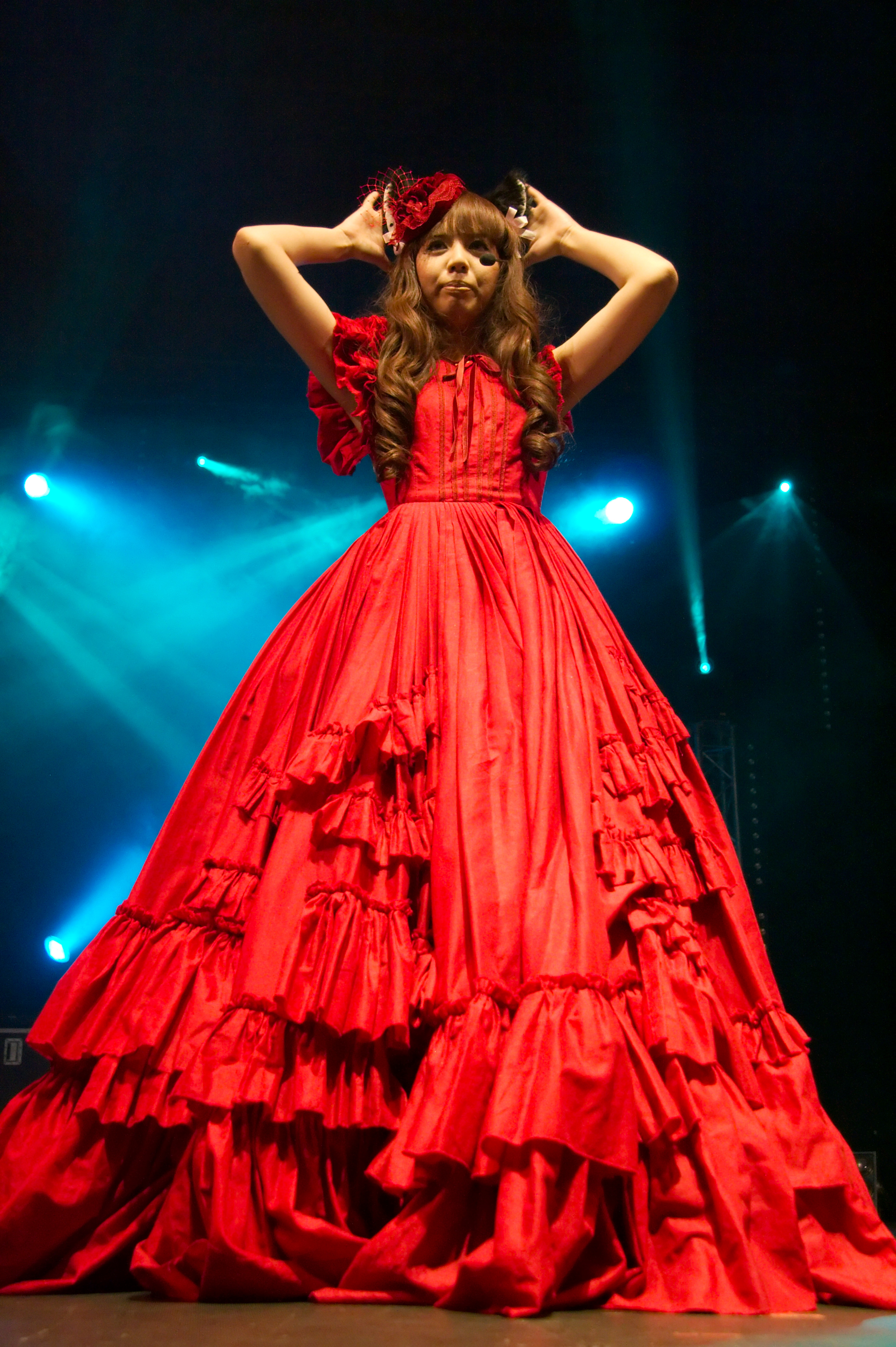
- Wakeshima performing at Japan Expo 2009
- Studio albums: 4
- Singles: 10
- Music videos: 5
- Digital singles: 2

This is the discography of Japanese singer and cellist Kanon Wakeshima.

== Albums ==
=== Studio albums ===
#	Information	Peak Chart Position
1st	Shinshoku Dolce: Release date: February 11, 2009	#47
2nd	Lolitawork Libretto: Release date: July 27, 2010	#83
3rd	Tsukinami: Release date: February 25, 2015	#30
4th	Luminescence Q.E.D.: Release date: November 30, 2016	—

=== EPs ===
#	Information
1st	Odd Sting & Intrigue: Release date: October 20, 2019

=== Singles ===
Year	Physical #	Information	Peak Chart Position	Album
2008	1st	"Still Doll"	#33	Shinshoku Dolce
2008	2nd	"Suna No Oshiro"	#39	Shinshoku Dolce
2009	—	"Toumei no Kagi"	—	Lolitawork Libretto
2009	—	"Otome no March"	—	Lolitawork Libretto
2012	3rd	"Foul Play ni Kurari / Sakura Meikyuu"	#35	Tsukinami
2014	4th	"Signal"	#54	Tsukinami
2014	5th	"Killy Killy Joker"	#34	Tsukinami
2014	6th	"World's End, Girl's Rondo"	#17	Tsukinami
2015	7th	"Right Light Rise"	#50	Luminescence Q.E.D.
2015	8th	"Kimi wa Soleil"	#64	Luminescence Q.E.D.
2016	9th	"Love Your Enemies"	#24	Luminescence Q.E.D.
2016	10th	"Unbalance by Me"	—	Luminescence Q.E.D.

=== Digital Single ===
#	Year	Information	Peak Chart Position
1st	2018	One Last Time: Released date: 5 May 2018	
2nd	2018	Roses: Released date: 28 June 2018	
3rd	2020	Poolside: Released date: 27 June 2020	
4th	2023	Shojokikan: Released date: 1 December 2023	
5th	2024	Imawanomegami: Released date: 28 February 2024	

=== Kanon x Kanon singles ===
Year	Physical #	Single	Peak chart position	Album
2010	1st	"Calendula Requiem"	—	Non-album Single
2011	2nd	"Koi no Doutei"	—	Non-album Single

=== Best Album ===
Year	Information	Peak Chart Position
2019	DECADE: Released date: 13 February 2019	

== Music videos ==
Year	Video	Director
2008	"Still Doll"	—
2008	"Suna No Oshiro"	—
2009	"Lolitawork Libretto ~Storytelling by Solita~"	—

=== Kanon x Kanon music videos ===
Year	Video	Director
2010	"Calendula Requiem"	—

== Guest contributions ==
- Featured on the track "Halloween Party" by Halloween Junky Orchestra (2012)
