= Tommy february6 discography =

Tommy february^{6} discography
- Studio albums: 4
- Compilation albums: 1
- Singles: 9

The discography of Japanese pop singer Tomoko Kawase's alter-ego pseudonym "Tommy february^{6}" consists of four studio albums, one compilation album and 9 singles, released through Defstar Records between 2003 and 2009, and later Warner from 2011 to 2013. From 2014 to 2023 she released music through House of TMY Records (UMJ).

Many of her albums and singles are released in February, including her debut album Tommy february^{6} (2001), "Magic in Your Eyes" (2004), Strawberry Cream Soda Pop Daydream (2009), February & Heavenly (2012) and "Be My Valentine" (2013).

== Studio albums ==
List of albums, with selected chart positions
Title	Album details	Peak positions	Sales	Certifications
Title	Album details	JPN	Sales	Certifications
Tommy february^{6}	Released: February 6, 2002; Label: Defstar Records; Formats: CD, CD+DVD, digital download	1	714,000	RIAJ: Platinum (+400,000)
Tommy Airline	Released: March 17, 2004; Label: Defstar; Formats: CD, CD+DVD, digital download	2	224,000	RIAJ: Platinum (+250,000)
February & Heavenly	Collaborative double album with Tommy heavenly^{6}; Released: February 29, 2012; Label: Warner; Formats: 2CD+DVD, digital download	12	13,000	
Tommy Candy Shop Sugar Me	Released: June 12, 2013; Label: Warner; Formats: CD, CD+DVD, digital download	9	10,000	

=== Extended play ===
List of extended plays, with selected chart positions
Title	Album details	Peak positions	Sales
Title	Album details	JPN	Sales
Tommy's Halloween Fairy Tale	Collaborative double album with Tommy heavenly^{6}; Released: October 21, 2015; Label: House of TMY Records; Formats: CD, digital download	28	4,000

=== Compilation albums ===
List of albums, with selected chart positions
Title	Album details	Peak positions	Sales
Title	Album details	JPN	Sales
Strawberry Cream Soda Pop Daydream	Released: February 25, 2009; Label: Defstar; Formats: CD, CD+DVD, digital download	5	53,000

== Singles ==
List of singles, with selected chart positions
Title	Year	Peak chart positions		Sales	Certifications	Album
Title	Year	JPN	JPN Hot (Note: The Japan Hot 100 was established in February 2008.)	Sales	Certifications	Album
"Everyday at the Bus Stop"	2001	12	—	136,000		Tommy february^{6}
"Kiss One More Time"	2001	20	—	62,000		Tommy february^{6}
"Bloomin'!"	2002	10	—	85,000		Tommy february^{6}
"Je t'aime je t'aime"	2003	5	—	146,000	RIAJ (physical): Gold (+200,000)	Tommy Airline
"Love Is Forever"	2003	6	—	48,000	RIAJ (physical): Gold (+100,000)	Tommy Airline
"Magic in Your Eyes"	2004	6	—	67,000	RIAJ (physical): Gold (+100,000)	Tommy Airline
"Lovely (Yumemiru Lovely Boy)"	2004	14	—	29,000		Pokémon: Destiny Deoxys Music Collection
"Lonely in Gorgeous"	2005	20	—	15,000		Paradise Kiss Original Soundtrack
"Be My Valentine"	2013	26	24	5,000		Tommy Candy Shop Sugar Me
"Cupcake Angels"	2018	—	—			Non-album single
"—" denotes releases that did not chart.

=== Promotional singles ===
Title	Year	Peak chart positions	Album
Title	Year	JPN Hot	Album
"Can't Take My Eyes Off You"	2002	—	Tommy february^{6}
"Strawberry Cream Soda Pop"	2009	—	Strawberry Cream Soda Pop Daydream
"Hot Chocolat"	2012	86	February & Heavenly
"Why Don't You Come With Me?"	2012	—	Halloween Addiction
"Runaway"	2013	—	Tommy Candy Shop Sugar Me
"Sugar Me"	2013	—	Tommy Candy Shop Sugar Me
"The Sparkling Candy Man"	2014	—	Tommy's Halloween Fairy Tale
"Kitty Ninja"	2017	—	Non-album single
"—" denotes releases that did not chart.

== Music videos ==
Year	Video	Director
2001	"Everyday at the Bus Stop"	N/A
2001	"Kiss One More Time"	N/A
2002	"Bloomin'!"	N/A
2003	"Je t'aime je t'aime"	N/A
2003	"Love Is Forever"	N/A
2004	"Magic in Your Eyes"	N/A
2004	"Lovely: Yume Miru Lovely Boy"	N/A
2005	"Lonely in Gorgeous"	N/A
2009	"Strawberry Cream Soda Pop"	N/A
2009	"Wait for Me There (february ^{6} Version)"	N/A
2009	"Leaving You (february ^{6} Version)"	N/A
2012	"Hot Chocolat"	N/A
2012	"Why Don't You Come with Me?"	N/A
2013	"Runaway"	Tomoko Kawase
2013	"Sugar Me"	Tomoko Kawase

=== Guest appearances ===
Year	Artist	Video	Director
2003	Tommy heavenly^{6}	"Wait till I Can Dream"	N/A
2006	Tommy heavenly^{6}	"Lollipop Candy Bad Girl"	N/A
2006	Tommy heavenly^{6}	"I Love Xmas"	N/A
2008	Tommy heavenly^{6}	"Papermoon"	N/A
2009	Tommy heavenly^{6}	"Unlimited Sky"	N/A
2011	Tommy heavenly^{6}	"I'm Your Devil (Halloween Remix)"	N/A
2012	Halloween Junky Orchestra	"Halloween Party"	N/A

== Other appearances ==
List of non-studio album or guest appearances that feature Tommy february^{6}.
Title	Year	Album
"Game of Love" (Hakase-sun featuring Tommy february^{6})	2001	Plays Boyz Toyz Reggay
"Magic in Your Eyes (Instrumental for TV)"	2004	Okusama wa Majo: Bewitched in Tokyo OST
"Magic in Your Eyes (Instrumental for TV/Piano Version)"	2004	Okusama wa Majo: Bewitched in Tokyo OST
"Kiss One More Time (Sunaga t Experience's Euro Set Remix)"	2006	World Standard 06
"Je t'aime je t'aime (DMC Yō)" (DMC用; "DMC Use")	2008	Detroit Metal City Tribute Album
"All Through the Night"	2008	We Love Cyndi – Tribute to Cyndi Lauper
"Halloween Party" (Halloween Junky Orchestra)	2012	"Halloween Party" (single)
"Why Don't You Come with Me?" (Tommy heavenly^{6} featuring Tommy february^{6})	2012	Halloween Addiction (single)

List of composition for others artists provided by Tommy february^{6}.
Year	Title	Artist(s)	Album
2003	"You'll Be My Boy"	Tommy☆angels	single
2003	"Stars to shine again"	SPEED	BRIDGE
2003	"♡Wanna be your girlfriend♡"	Asuka Hinoi	single
2005	"OH MY JULIET!"	Takashi Fujii	SHANGHAI TA-WAN / Babel: Music from and Inspired by the Motion Picture
2014	"Heart no Hoshi" (ハートの地球)	Sakura Gakuin	DVD single
