= Tommy heavenly6 discography =

Tommy heavenly^{6} discography
- Studio albums: 4
- Extended plays: 1
- Compilation albums: 1
- Singles: 10

The discography of Japanese pop singer Tomoko Kawase's alter-ego pseudonym Tommy heavenly^{6} consists of four studio albums, one compilation album, an extended play and 10 singles, released through Defstar Records between 2003 and 2009, and later Warner from 2011 to 2013. From 2014 to 2023 Tommy released music through House of TMY Records (UMJ).

== Studio albums ==
List of albums, with selected chart positions
Title	Album details	Peak positions	Sales	Certifications
Title	Album details	JPN	Sales	Certifications
Tommy Heavenly^{6}	Released: August 24, 2005; Label: Defstar Records; Formats: CD, CD+DVD, digital download	4	85,000	RIAJ: Gold (+100,000)
Heavy Starry Heavenly	Released: March 7, 2007; Label: Defstar; Formats: CD, CD+DVD, digital download	9	43,000	
I Kill My Heart	Released: April 29, 2009; Label: Defstar; Formats: CD, CD+DVD, digital download	9	17,000	
February & Heavenly	Collaborative double album with Tommy Heavenly^{6}; Released: February 29, 2012; Label: Warner; Formats: 2CD+DVD, digital download	12	13,000	
Tommy Ice Cream Heaven Forever	Released: October 23, 2013; Label: Warner; Formats: CD, CD+DVD, digital download	17	8,000	

=== Extended plays ===
List of extended plays, with selected chart positions
Title	Album details	Peak positions	Sales
Title	Album details	JPN	Sales
Halloween Addiction	Released: October 17, 2012; Label: Warner; Formats: CD, CD+DVD, digital download	17	8,000
Tommy's Halloween Fairy Tale	Collaborative double album with Tommy heavenly^{6}; Released: October 21, 2015; Label: House of TMY Records; Formats: CD, digital download	28	4,000

=== Compilation albums ===
List of albums, with selected chart positions
Title	Album details	Peak positions		Sales
Title	Album details	JPN	TWN East Asian (Note: Position was taken from 2009 week 10.)	Sales
Gothic Melting Ice Cream's Darkness Nightmare	Released: February 25, 2009; Label: Defstar; Formats: CD, CD+DVD, digital download	6	17	49,000

== Singles ==
List of singles, with selected chart positions
Title	Year	Peak chart positions		Sales	Certifications	Album
Title	Year	JPN	JPN Hot (Note: The Japan Hot 100 was established in February 2008.)	Sales	Certifications	Album
"Wait till I Can Dream"	2003	5	—	48,000		Tommy heavenly^{6}
"Hey My Friend"	2004	20	—	40,000		Tommy heavenly^{6}
"Ready?"	2005	15	—	13,000		Tommy heavenly^{6}
"I'm Gonna Scream"	2006	22	—	15,000		Heavy Starry Heavenly
"Pray"	2006	10	—	42,000	RIAJ (cellphone): Gold (+100,000)	Heavy Starry Heavenly
"Lollipop Candy Bad Girl"	2006	12	—	15,000		Heavy Starry Heavenly
"I Love Xmas"	2006	29	—	9,000		Heavy Starry Heavenly
"Heavy Starry Chain"	2007	20	—	9,000		Heavy Starry Heavenly
"Papermoon"	2008	10	26	19,000		Gothic Melting Ice Cream's Darkness Nightmare
"Monochrome Rainbow"	2011	23	71	5,000		February & Heavenly
"Ice Cream Devils"	2018	—	—			Non-album singles
"Living Dead Diner Girls -Halloween-"	2026	—	— (Note: "Living Dead Diner Girls -Halloween-" did not chart on the Billboard Japan Hot 100, but peaked at number 61 on the Download Songs chart.)			Non-album singles
"—" denotes releases that did not chart.

=== Promotional singles ===
Title	Year	Peak chart positions	Album
Title	Year	JPN Hot	Album
"Unlimited Sky"	2009	—	Gothic Melting Ice Cream's Darkness Nightmare
"I'm Your Devil"	2010	—	February & Heavenly
"Ruby Eyes"	2013	—	Tommy Ice Cream Heaven Forever
"The Sparkling Candy Man"	2014	—	Tommy's Halloween Fairy Tale
"—" denotes releases that did not chart.

== Music videos ==
Year	Video
2003	"Wait till I Can Dream"
2003	"Swear"
2004	"Hey My Friend"
2005	"Ready?"
2005	"Gothic Pink"
2006	"I'm Gonna Scream"
2006	"Pray"
2006	"Lollipop Candy Bad Girl"
2006	"I Love Xmas"
2007	"Heavy Starry Chain"
2008	"Papermoon"
2009	"Unlimited Sky"
2009	"Wait for Me There"
2009	"Leaving You"
2011	"I'm Your Devil (Halloween Remix)"
2011	"Monochrome Rainbow"
2012	"Never Ending Party Night"
2012	"Ruby Eyes"

=== Guest video appearances ===
Year	Artist	Video
2009	Tommy february^{6}	"Strawberry Cream Soda Pop"
2012	Tommy february^{6}	"Hot Chocolat"
2012	Halloween Junky Orchestra	"Halloween Party"

== Other appearances ==
List of non-album or guest appearances that feature Tommy Heavenly^{6}.
Title	Year	Album
"GIMME ALL OF YOUR LOVE !!" (Tommy heavenly6 for BLACK STONES)	2005	LOVE for NANA 〜Only 1 Tribute〜
"Unlimited Sky (Acoustic Version)"	2009	Mobile Suit Gundam 00 Complete Best
"Halloween Party" (Halloween Junky Orchestra)	2012	"Halloween Party" (single)
"La Soldier" (ラ・ソウルジャー, Ra Sourujā)	2014	Sailor Moon the 20th Anniversary Memorial Tribute (single)

List of composition for others artists provided by Tommy Heavenly^{6}.
Year	Title	Artist(s)	Album
2013	"My Graduation Toss"	Sakura Gakuin	Sakura Gakuin Nendo 2012 ~My Generation~ (さくら学院 2012年度 ～My Generation～)
