= Antic Cafe (album) =

Compilation album by An Cafe
- Released: December 9, 2009 (JP)
- Genre: Rock
- Label: Loop Ash

An Cafe chronology
BB Parallel World (2008)	Antic Cafe (2009)

Antic Cafe (アンティック-珈琲店-, Antikku Kafe) is a compilation album released by An Cafe on December 9, 2009 in Japan. This was made after An Cafe decided their hiatus and is an album featuring all of their best songs plus an unreleased song "Nijikan Shabondama". The album peaked at No. 18 on the Japanese albums chart.

== Track listing ==
All lyrics are written by Miku.

Disc one (CD)
No.	Title	Lyrics	Music	Length
1.	"Candy Holic"	Miku	Kanon
2.	"Odoru Meruhen Tokei"	Miku	Kanon
3.	"Ese Urunai"	Miku	Kanon
4.	"Touhi Kairo"	Miku	Kanon
5.	"Ame No Hankagai"	Miku	An Cafe
6.	"Hisoukyou"	Miku	An Cafe
7.	"Wagamama Koushinkyoku"	Miku	Bou
8.	"Tekesuta Kousen"	Miku	Kanon
9.	"Escapism"	Miku	Bou
10.	"Merry Making"	Miku	Kanon
11.	"Maple Gunman"	Miku	Kanon
12.	"Koukai"	Miku	Kanon
13.	"Nijikan Shabondama"	Miku	An Cafe
14.	"Meguriaeta Kiseki"	Miku	Bou
15.	"BondS ~Kizuna~"	Miku	Kanon

All lyrics are written by Miku.

Disc two (CD)
No.	Title	Lyrics	Music	Length
1.	"Lock On The O New Sekai"	Miku	Kanon
2.	"Smile Ichiban Ii Onna"	Miku	Teruki
3.	"Snow Scene"	Miku	Kanon
4.	"Kakusei Heroism"	Miku	Teruki
5.	"Ryusei Rocket"	Miku	Teruki
6.	"Koi No Dependence"	Miku	Kanon
7.	"Orange Dream"	Miku	Teruki
8.	"Cherry Saku Yuuki"	Miku	Teruki
9.	"Koritsu Hospital"	Miku	Takuya
10.	"SUMMER DIVE"	Miku	Teruki
11.	"My ♥ Leaps For "C""	Miku	An Cafe
12.	"Kawayu's Rock"	Miku	An Cafe
13.	"AROMA"	Miku	An Cafe
14.	"Natsu Koi Natsu Game"	Miku	Takuya
15.	"You"	Miku	An Cafe
