= Ko Akuma Usagi no Koibumi to Machine Gun =

Ko Akuma Usagi no Koibumi to Machine Gun e.p.

EP by An Cafe
- Released: October 29, 2008
- Genre: Pop rock
- Length: 14:20
- Label: Loop Ash

An Cafe chronology
Gokutama Rock Cafe (2008)	Ko Akuma Usagi no Koibumi to Machine Gun e.p. (2008)	Harajuku Dance Rock (2009)

Ko Akuma Usagi no Koibumi to Machine Gun e.p. (小悪魔Usagiの恋文とマシンガンe.p., The Little Demon Rabbit's Loveletter and Machinegun) is an EP released by An Cafe on October 29, 2008 in Japan. The E.P peaked at No. 12 on the Japanese chart.

== Track listing ==
CD
No.	Title	Length
1.	"My ♥ Leaps for "C""
2.	"Kawayu's ЯocК" (可愛湯's ЯocК)
3.	"Zetsubou"
4.	"Nyappy in the world 4 -Hannyaka Kyo no Theme-" (Nyappy in the world 4 -般ニャ化教のテーマ-)

DVD
No.	Title	Length
1.	"My ♥ Leaps for "C""
