= Love Your Enemies (disambiguation) =

"Love your enemies" is a Bible phrase from the Sermon on the Mount, specifically Matthew 5:44.

Love Your Enemies may also refer to:

- "Love your enemies", also appears in Luke 6:27
- Love Your Enemies (album), a 1996 album by Microdisney
- "Love Your Enemies" (song), a 2016 song by Kanon Wakeshima
- Love Your Enemies, a 1993 novel by Nicola Barker
- "Love Your Enemies", a 2015 episode of the TV series Amish Mafia
- Love Your Enemies: How Decent People Can Save America from the Culture of Contempt, a 2019 book by Arthur C. Brooks
