= Gokutama Rock Cafe =

Studio album by An Cafe
- Released: March 14, 2008 (EU); April 9, 2008 (JP)
- Genre: Rock
- Label: Loop Ash; Gan-Shin

An Cafe chronology
Magnya Carta (2006)	Gokutama Rock Cafe (2008)	Ko Akuma Usagi no Koibumi to Machine Gun (2008)

Singles from Gokutama Rock Cafe
- 1. "Kakusei Heroism" Released: August 22, 2007; 2. "Ryuusei Rocket" Released: November 7, 2007; 3. "Cherry Saku Yuki!!" Released: February 28, 2008

Gokutama Rock Cafe (極魂Rock Cafe) is the third studio album released by An Cafe on March 14, 2008 in Europe and April 9, 2008 in Japan. The European release of the album also featured three bonus tracks which were previously only available as B-Sides on their last three singles, all of which were also taken from this album. A limited edition includes a DVD with the music videos for "Kakusei Heroism", "Ryuusei Rocket" and "Cherry Saku Yuki!!", as well as documentary footage from their Yagai de Nyappy tour.

The album debuted at number ten on the official Swedish album charts, and at twenty-sixth on the Finnish album charts. It also peaked at No. 13 on the Japanese albums chart.

== Track listing ==
All lyrics are written by Miku.

Disc one (CD)
No.	Title	Lyrics	Music	Length
1.	"Ryūsei Rocket" (流星ロケット)	Miku	Teruki	4:33
2.	"S*B*Y" (S☆B☆Y)	Miku	Kanon	3:54
3.	"Cherry Saku Yūki!!" (Cherry咲く勇気!!)	Miku	Teruki	3:58
4.	"NYAPPY in the world 3"	Miku	Teruki	4:45
5.	"Baby King" (ベイビーキング)	Miku	Kanon	4:13
6.	"Daybreak" (デイブレイク)	Miku	Yuuki	4:08
7.	"Pierced" (ピアス)	Miku	Teruki	5:13
8.	"Koritsu Hospital" (孤立ホスピタル)	Miku	Takuya	4:28
9.	"Kakusei Heroism" (覚醒ヒロイズム)	Miku	Teruki	4:18
10.	"Aijo Cycling" (愛情サイクリング)	Miku	Teruki	4:47
11.	"Orange Dream" (オレンジドリーム)	Miku	Teruki	5:41

Bonus Tracks (CD) (European Release Only)
No.	Title	Lyrics	Music	Length
12.	"Respect Mommy ~hito no yaku tatereba ii jibun no tokui na koto de~" (リスペクトマミー ～人の役 立てればいい 自分の得意なことで～)	Miku	Kanon	5:01
13.	"Koi no Dependence" (恋のディペンデンス)	Miku	Kanon	4:03
14.	"One Way Love"	Miku	Teruki	4:37

Disc two (DVD, limited edition only)
No.	Title	Length
1.	"Kakusei Heroism" (Music video)
2.	"Ryusei Rocket" (Music video)
3.	"Cherry Saku Yuki" (Music video)
4.	"Yagai de Nyappy Yanen Charinko man Document" (Tour footage)
