= Harajuku Dance Rock =

EP by An Cafe
- Released: March 13, 2009
- Genre: Dance-rock
- Length: 27:28
- Label: Maru Music, GAN-SHIN Records, Universal

An Cafe chronology
| Gokutama Rock Cafe (2008) | Harajuku Dance Rock (2009) | BB Parallel World (2009) |

Harajuku Dance Rock is an EP released by An Cafe on March 13, 2009. Available only in North America and certain parts of Europe as an overseas mini album, "Harajuku Dance Rock" includes seven audio tracks and three music videos on a separate DVD. There is also a full-color booklet with both the Japanese lyrics and the romaji version of the lyrics.

== Track listing ==
CD
| No. | Title | Length |
|---|---|---|
| 1. | "Summer Dive ~Sweet-Melty Peach☆Beach~" | 4:39 |
| 2. | "My ♥ Leaps for "C"" | 3:32 |
| 3. | "Kawayu's ЯocК/Kawayu's RocK" (可愛湯のЯocК) | 3:08 |
| 4. | "Zetsubou" | 3:32 |
| 5. | "Nyappy in the World 4 -Hannyaka Kyo no Theme/Theme to Hannyaism-" (Nyappy in the World 4 -般ニャ化教のテーマ-) | 4:02 |
| 6. | "Aroma" (アロマ) | 4:16 |
| 7. | "Best Apart" (最高のアパート) | 4:19 |

DVD
| No. | Title | Length |
|---|---|---|
| 1. | "Summer Dive ~Sweet-Melty Peach☆Beach~" (PV) |
| 2. | "My ♥ Leaps for "C"" (PV) |
| 3. | "Aroma" (PV) |
