= Tsukinami =

Tsukinami (月並み monthly, therefore "mediocre") may refer to:

- Tsukinami, mediocre writers of the 19th century Haiku, after the monthly haikai gatherings
- Tsukinami shiai (月次試合 monthly tournaments) in Judo, Kyushin Ryu
- Tsukinami (album)
