= Hot chocolate (disambiguation) =

Hot chocolate is a beverage made by mixing chocolate with water or milk.

Hot chocolate may also refer to:

== Music ==
- Hot Chocolate (band), a British soul band
  - Hot Chocolate (album), an album by the band Hot Chocolate
- Hot Chocolate, an early name of the band Graham Central Station
- "Hot Chocolate", a song from The Polar Express (soundtrack)
- Hot Chocolates, a 1929 musical revue
- "Hot Chocolat", a song by Tomoko Kawase

== Other uses ==
- Larry Edwards (entertainer), a drag queen, also known as Hot Chocolate
- "Hot chocolate", an alternate name for the game called Statues, in the UK and Australia

== See also ==
- Hot chocolate effect
