= Fūma no Kojirō =

Manga by Masami Kurumada

- Cover of the first manga volume

風魔の小次郎
- Manga
- Written by: Masami Kurumada
- Published by: Shueisha
- Imprint: Jump Comics
- Magazine: Weekly Shōnen Jump
- Original run: January 11, 1982 – November 21, 1983
- Volumes: 10
- Original video animation
- Directed by: Hidehito Ueda (chief)
- Produced by: Nagateru Kato; Yasuhisa Kazama
- Written by: Takao Koyama (head)
- Music by: Toshiro Imaizumi
- Studio: J.C. Staff
- Released: June 1, 1989 – December 1, 1990
- Runtime: 25−30 minutes (each)
- Episodes: 12
Further information
Original video animation
Fūma Hanran-hen
Directed by	Yoshinori Nakamura
Produced by	Nagateru Kato; Yumiko Masujima
Written by	Motonori Tachikawa; Tomoyuki Machida
Music by	Toshiro Imaizumi
Studio	J.C. Staff
Released	November 21, 1992
Runtime	50 minutes
Manga
Yagyū Ansatsuchō
Written by	Satoshi Yuri
Published by	Akita Shoten
Magazine	Champion Red
Original run	September 19, 2003 – May 19, 2006
Volumes	3
Television drama
Directed by	Toshihiko Ōoka; Ryūichi Ichino
Written by	Takashi Ito; Megumu Sasano
Music by	Kōichirō Kameyama
Studio	General Entertainment
Original network	Tokyo MX
Original run	October 3, 2007 – December 26, 2007
Episodes	13
Manga
Jo no Maki
Written by	Masami Kurumada
Published by	Akita Shoten
Magazine	Champion Red
Original run	August 2019 – October 2019
Volumes	1
Manga
Asuka Mumyōchō
Written by	Masami Kurumada
Published by	Akita Shoten
Magazine	Champion Red
Original run	August 2022 – January 2025
Volumes	1

Fūma no Kojirō (風魔の小次郎; 'Kojiro of the Fuma Clan') is a Japanese manga series written and illustrated by Masami Kurumada. It was published in Weekly Shōnen Jump from January 1982 to November 1983. It tells the story of sword legends and rivalry between ninja clans. The main character Kojiro is a young boy who is a member of the Fuma clan.

The series was adapted into an original video animation (OVA) series released between June 1989 and December 1990, plus an additional episode released in November 1992.

A sequel entitled Yagyū Ansatsuchō (柳生暗殺帖; 'Yagyu's Murder Book'), written and illustrated by Satoshi Yuri, was published in Akita Shoten's Champion Red between 2003 and 2006.

In October 2007, a tokusatsu dorama adaptation began airing on Tokyo MX, starring Ryouta Murai in the lead role of Kojiro.

== Plot ==
Hakuo Academy used to be a prestigious high school, and famous for martial arts. However, because its rival school Seishikan has been cowardly luring its superior students, Hakuo was going to decline. In order to recover from the situation, the acting principal of Hakuo; Himeko Hojo, sends Ranko Yagyu to the Fuma village in search of the famous Fuma ninja clan for assistance. The leader of the Fuma sent Kojiro to Hakuo, there he faces the notorious Yasha clan who fights for Seishikan led by Musashi Asuka. Kojiro's comrades arrive, resuming an all-out ninja war that began five centuries ago.

Kojiro with his friends, will fight in the "war of the sacred swords", for the conquest of the ten swords that give the power to rule over the whole world.

== Characters ==
=== Fuma Clan ===
Kojiro (小次郎, Kojirō)
Voiced by: Keiichi Nanba
Portrayed by: Ryouta Murai
Ryoma (竜魔, Ryōma)
Voiced by: Hideyuki Hori
Portrayed by: Gaku Shindo
Kirikaze (霧風)
Voiced by: Nobuo Tobita
Portrayed by: Yūta Furukawa
Ryuho (劉鵬, Ryūhō)
Voiced by: Yūsaku Yara
Portrayed by: Takehisa Takayama
Kou (項羽, Kōu)
Voiced by: Shigeru Nakahara
Portrayed by: Naoya Sakamoto
Shoryu (小龍, Shōryū)
Voiced by: Shigeru Nakahara
Portrayed by: Kazuya Sakamoto
Rinpyo (琳彪, Rinpyō)
Voiced by: Kōichi Yamadera
Portrayed by: Tsuyoshi Takahashi
Kabutomaru (兜丸)
Voiced by: Michitaka Kobayashi
Portrayed by: Shingo Yashiro
Reira (麗羅)
Voiced by: Toshihiko Seki
Portrayed by: Hiroki Suzuki
Fuma Leader
Voiced by: Hideyuki Tanaka
Komomo (小桃)

=== Hakuo Academy ===
Fūma no Kojirō - Yagyū Ansatsuchō compilation cover art

Ranko Yagyu (柳生 蘭子, Yagyū Ranko)
Voiced by: Mami Koyama
Portrayed by: Ayumi
Himeko Hojo (北条 姫子, Hōjō Himeko)
Voiced by: Yūko Mizutani
Portrayed by: Makoto Kawahara

=== Seishikan ===
Musashi Asuka (飛鳥 武蔵, Asuka Musashi)
Voiced by: Shō Hayami
Portrayed by: Takuji Kawakubo
Erina Asuka (飛鳥 絵里菜, Asuka Erina)
Musashi's younger sister.
Voiced by: Chieko Honda
Portrayed by: Nonoka Imaizumi

=== Yasha Clan ===
Kosuke Mibu (壬生 攻介, Mibu Kōsuke)
Voiced by: Kazuhiko Inoue
Portrayed by: Rei Fujita
Princess Yasha (夜叉姫, Yasha-hime)
Voiced by: Fumi Hirano
Portrayed by: Natsuki Okamoto
Maya (魔矢)

=== 8 Yasha Generals ===
Byakko (白虎; "White Tiger")
Voiced by: Kenyu Horiuchi
Portrayed by: Yasuka Saitoh
Shiranui (不知火; "Mysterious Sea Light")
Portrayed by: Haruki Itabashi
Shien (紫炎; "Purple Flame")
Voiced by: Yoku Shioya
Portrayed by: Atsushi Maruyama
Raiden (雷電; "Thunder Lightning")
Voiced by: Masashi Hironaka
Portrayed by: Takuma Harada
Anki (闇鬼; "Darkness Demon")
Voiced by: Ryō Horikawa
Portrayed by: Kōtarō Endō
Kurojishi (黒獅子; "Black Lion")
Voiced by: Banjō Ginga
Portrayed by: Jun Shirota
Yosui (妖水, Yōsui; "Magic Water")
Voiced by: Kaneto Shiozawa
Portrayed by: Yū Kawada
Kagero (陽炎, Kagerō; "Shining Flame")
Voiced by: Jūrōta Kosugi
Portrayed by: Kōji Tashiro

=== Cosmo Warriors ===
Sigma (死牙馬, Shiguma)
Voiced by: Kazuki Yao
Soshi Date (伊達 総司, Date Sōshi)
Voiced by: Yasunori Matsumoto

=== Chaos Warriors ===
Emperor Chaos (華悪崇皇帝, Kaosu-kōtei)
Voiced by: Hirotaka Suzuoki
Nero (涅絽, Nerō)
Voiced by: Hirokazu Hiramatsu
Oz (雄皇, Ozu)
Voiced by: Takeshi Kusao
Jackal (邪火麗, Jakkaru)
Voiced by: Nobuyuki Furuta
Shura (朱羅)
Voiced by: Takehito Koyasu

== Media ==
=== Manga ===
Fūma no Kojirō is written and illustrated by Masami Kurumada. The manga was published in Shueisha's Weekly Shōnen Jump from January 11, 1982, to November 21, 1983. Shueisha collected its chapters in ten tankōbon volumes, released from August 15, 1982, to May 15, 1984.

In 2003, a sequel entitled Fūma no Kojirō: Yagyū Ansatsuchō started in Akita Shoten's Champion Red on September 19, 2003. The manga is written by Kurumada and illustrated by Satoshi Yuri. The series finished on May 19, 2006. Akita Shoten compiled the individual chapters into three tankōbon volumes released between July 29, 2004, and May 18, 2006.

A short series, titled Fūma no Kojirō: Jo no Maki (風魔の小次郎 序の巻) was serialized in Champion Red from August 19 to October 19, 2019. Another series, titled Fūma no Kojirō Gaiden: Asuka Mumyōchō (風魔の小次郎 外伝 飛鳥無明帖), started in the same magazine on August 19, 2022.

=== Original video animations ===
A twelve-episode OVA series was produced by Animate Film and J.C. Staff. It was split in two arcs of six episodes each. The first arc was released between June 1 and August 2, 1989. The second arc was released between September 21 and December 1, 1990. An additional one-episode OVA was released on November 21, 1992.

Arcs

Arcs
The Yasha Clan	Episodes 1–6
The Sacred Swords War	Episodes 7–12
Fūma Rebellion	Special

Episodes

No.	Title	Directed by	Written by	Animation director	Storyboards by	Original release date
1	"Fuma Clan! The Arrival of Kojiro!" "Kaze no Ichizoku! Kojirō Kenzan!!" (風の一族! 小次郎見参!!)	Hideki Hiroshima	Takao Koyama	Shizuo Kawai	Hidehito Ueda	June 1, 1989
2	"Wood Thunder! The Flying Dragon's Supreme Sword!!" "Hayashi no Raimei! Hiryū Ha Sumeragi Ken!!" (林の雷鳴! 飛龍覇皇剣!!)	Shigeru Morikawa	Seiko Watanabe	Jūji Mizumura	Shigeru Morikawa	June 1, 1989
3	"Crossfire! The 8 Generals of the Yasha Clan!!" "Hi no Shūketsu! Yasha Hachi Shōgun!!" (火の集結! 夜叉八将軍!!)	Osamu Yamasaki	Yumi Kageyama	Shizuo Kawai	Osamu Yamasaki	July 1, 1989
4	"Hallucinations on the Mountain! The Fog's Killer!!" "Yama no Maboroshi Yume! Kiri no Shikaku!!" (山の幻夢! 霧の刺客!!)	Jun'ya Koshiba	Satoru Akahori	Hironobu Saitō	Jun'ya Koshiba	July 1, 1989
5	"Dancing Lights! The Fuma's Deadly Mirror!!" "Hikari no Bukyoku! Fuma-shi Kyō Ken!!" (光の舞曲! 風魔死鏡剣!!)	Yoshinori Nakamura	Katsuyuki Sumisawa	Mitsuharu Kajitani	Yoshinori Nakamura	August 2, 1989
6	"Rest in the Snow! The Voice That Calls the Warrior!!" "Yuki no Shūen! Senshi o Yobu Koe!!" (雪の終焉! 戦士を呼ぶ声!!)	Hideki Hiroshima	Naruhisa Arakawa	Shizuo Kawai	Hidehito Ueda	August 2, 1989
7	"Emperor Chaos" "Kaosu" (華悪崇)	Nanako Shimazaki	Takao Koyama	Shingo Araki	Hidehito Ueda	September 21, 1990
8	"The Ten Sacred Swords" "Jū Seiken" (十聖剣)	Hideki Tonokatsu	Takao Koyama	Shingo Araki	Hideki Tonokatsu	September 21, 1990
9	"Cosmos" "Chitsujo" (秩序)	Jun'ya Koshiba	Takao Koyama	Shingo Araki	Kazunori Mizuno	October 21, 1990
10	"Gathering" "Shūketsu" (集結)	Hideki Tonokatsu	Takao Koyama	Shingo Araki	Hideki Tonokatsu	October 21, 1990
11	"Phoenix Heavenly Dance" "Hōō Tenbu" (鳳凰天舞)	Akihiro Izumi	Takao Koyama	Akihiro Izumi	Hideki Tonokatsu	December 1, 1990
12	"The Wheel of Samsara" "Rinne Tenshō" (輪廻転生)	Nanako Shimazaki	Takao Koyama	Keiichi Satō Kyōko Chino	Hidehito Ueda	December 1, 1990
Special	"Fuma Rebellion" "Fūma Hanran-hen" (風魔反乱篇)	Yoshinori Nakamura	Motonori Tachikawa Tomoyuki Machida	Mitsuharu Kajitani	Hidehito Ueda	November 21, 1992

=== Drama ===
A thirteen-episode live-action television drama series adaptation was announced in July 2007. It was broadcast from October to December 2007. The opening theme is "Ryūsei Rocket" performed by An Cafe and the ending theme is "Eien no Setsuna" (永遠の刹那; lit. 'Eternal Moment') performed by On/Off.
