= On/Off (Japanese band) =

Japanese musical duo

- Origin: Japan
- Genre: J-pop
- Years active: 2007–2015
- Labels: Music Ray'n Inc.; DefStar Records
- Past members: Naoya Sakamoto; Kazuya Sakamoto
- Website: www.onoff-net.com

On/Off (stylized as ON/OFF) was a Japanese musical duo consisting of twin brothers Naoya and Kazuya Sakamoto. The duo debuted in 2007 with the single "Eien no Setsuna" (永遠の刹那; "Eternal Moment").

== History ==
=== 2007–2011 ===
On November 21, 2007, On/Off debuted with the single "Eien no Setsuna", which was used as the ending theme song the live-action adaptation of Fūma no Kojirō. The single debuted at number 59 on the Oricon charts.

On June 4, 2008, they released their second single "Futatsu no Kodō to Akai Tsumi". The single charted at 19. "Futatsu no Kodō to Akai Tsumi" was used as the opening theme song for the first season of anime series Vampire Knight.

On October 15, the duo released the single, "Rinne: Rondo", which became the opening song for Vampire Knight's second season.

On March 4, 2009, the duo released their single "Hana Kagari", which charted at number 18. On April 22, the two released their debut album ''Legend of Twins I: Futago Densetsu''.

On June 9, 2010, they released their single "Butterfly", which was also used in the anime Durarara!! as its ending theme song.

=== 2011–2015 ===
On February 11, 2011, they released their new single "Akatsuki". On May 4, they released their second single "Hajimaru no wa, Sayonara", which was used as second opening for anime series Beelzebub and was composed and produced by popular J-pop artist Daisuke Asakura.

On December 7, they released their last and final work, their second album 'Legend of Twins II: Zoku Futago Densetsu'.

In 2015, On/Off broke-up with the brothers pivoting to other careers.

== Members ==
- Naoya Sakamoto (坂本 直弥, Sakamoto Naoya)
- Kazuya Sakamoto (坂本 和弥, Sakamoto Kazuya)

== Discography ==
=== Albums ===
Title	Details	Chart positions
Title	Details	JP
Legend of Twins I: Futago Densetsu (Legend of Twins I－双子伝説－, Legend of Twins I: The Legend Twins)	Released: April 22, 2009; Label: Music Ray'n Inc.; Formats: CD, CD+DVD, Box set	
Legend of Twins II: Zoku Futago Densetsu	Released: December 7, 2011; Label: Music Rayn' Inc.	

=== Singles ===
Title	Year	Chart positions
Title	Year	JP
"Eien no Setsuna" (永遠の刹那, "Eternal Bond")	2007	59
"Futatsu no Kodō to Akai Tsumi" (ふたつの鼓動と赤い罪, "Two Beats and a Red Sin")	2008	19
"Rinne: Rondo" (輪廻－ロンド－, "Cycle: Rondo")	2008	
"Hana Kagari" (花篝－ハナカガリ－, "Hanakagari: Bamboo Flower")	2009	18
"Butterfly"	2010	15
"Akatsuki"	2011	
"Hajimaru no wa, Sayonara" (始まるのは、サヨナラ)	2011	31
