= Natsu Koi Natsu Game =

"Natsu Koi ★ Natsu GAME"

Single by An Cafe
- Released: August 12, 2009
- Genre: Rock/pop
- Length: 17:18
- Label: Loop Ash, Sony Music Entertainment.
- Songwriter: Takuya
- Producer: An Cafe

An Cafe singles chronology
"Aroma" (2009)	"Natsu Koi ★ Natsu GAME" (2009)

"Natsu Koi★Natsu GAME" (夏恋★夏GAME, Natsu Koi★ Natsu GEMU) is a single by Japanese band An Cafe. The single comes in three editions; the 2 limited versions including a bonus DVD with videoclip and a special Europe Footage. The title track will be featured in their album BB Parallel World. The song peaked at No. 13 on the Japanese singles chart.

== Track listing ==
Disc one (CD)

1. "Natsu Koi ★ Natsu GAME" (夏恋★夏GAME) – 4:01
2. "Boku Ha Soba Ni Iru Kara" (ボクは側にいるから) – 3:25

Disc two (DVD, Limited edition type A only)

1. "Natsu Koi ★ Natsu GAME Clip" (夏恋★夏GAME)

Disc two (DVD, Limited edition type B only)

1. Bonus DVD including featuring footage from their live stage performance.

== Personnel ==
- Miku – vocals
- Takuya – guitar
- Kanon – bass guitar
- Yuuki – electronic keyboard
- Teruki – drums
