= Smile Ichiban Ii Onna =

Single by Antic Cafe
- Released: September 20, 2006
- Genre: Pop rock
- Label: Loop Ash
- Songwriter(s): Teruki Nagata, Kazuhiko Bou Saito, Shinya Sano, Akiharu Tsukiyama

Antic Cafe singles chronology
"'Bonds ~Kizuna~'" (2006)	"Smile Ichiban Ii Onna" (2006)	"'Snow Scene'" (2006)

"Smile Ichiban Ii Onna" (スマイル一番 イイ♀, sumairū ichiban ii onna; The girl with the best smile) is the tenth single by Japanese band Antic Cafe. The title track is featured on the album Magnya Carta. The song peaked at No. 32 on the Japanese singles chart.

== Track listing ==
1. "Smile Ichiban Ii Onna" (スマイル一番 イイ♀) - 4:12
2. "Super Rabbit☆" (スーパーラビット☆)
