= Magnya Carta =

Studio album by An Cafe
- Released: November 29, 2006 (Japan); May 21, 2007 (South Korea)
- Genre: Rock
- Length: 49:44
- Label: Loop Ash

An Cafe chronology
Shikisai Moment (2005)	Magnya Carta (2006)	Gokutama Rock Cafe (2008)

Magnya Carta (マグニャカルタ, magunya karuta) is the second studio album by An Cafe, released on November 29, 2006, in Japan and on May 21, 2007, in South Korea. A limited edition was released as well, containing an additional DVD with several music videos. The album, which was also Bou's last appearance in An Cafe, peaked at No. 33 on the Japanese albums chart.

== Track listing ==
All lyrics are written by Miku.

Disc one (CD)
No.	Title	Lyrics	Music	Length
1.	"LOCK ON THE BRAND NEW WORLD/LOCK ON the o NEW Sekai" (Lock on ☆ザ☆ 御New世界)	Miku	Kanon	4:57
2.	"Smile Ichiban Ii Onna" (スマイル一番 イイ♀)	Miku	Teruki	4:12
3.	"NYAPPY in the world 2"	Miku	Bou	4:26
4.	"Pipopapo Telepathy" (♯＊＠☆ピポパポテレパシー☆＠＊♯)	Miku	Kanon	3:32
5.	"Maple Gunman" (メープルガンマン)	Miku	Kanon	3:51
6.	"Pxxxy'n PURIN/Pusshin Prin" (プッシンプリン)	Miku	Kanon	4:46
7.	"Portraying Light With Rainbow Colored Crayon" (Nanairo Crayon de Egaku Hikari, 七色クレヨンで描く光)	Miku	Teruki	5:10
8.	"Snow Scene" (スノーシーン)	Miku	Kanon	4:12
9.	"Narcissistic Little Devil" (Jikoaishugisha no Mijuku na Akuma, 自己愛主義者の未熟な悪魔)	Miku	Teruki	3:57
10.	"Stumble Across A Miracle" (Meguriaeta Kiseki, 巡り逢えた奇跡)	Miku	Bou	5:38
11.	"BondS ~Kizuna~ (magnya mix)" (BondS ～絆～ (マグニャカルタ mix))	Miku	Kanon	5:02

Disc two (DVD, limited edition only)
No.	Title	Length
1.	"Maple Gunman" (music video)
2.	"BondS ~Kizuna~" (music video)
3.	"Smile Ichiban Ii Onna" (music video)
4.	"Snow Scene" (music video)

== Personnel ==
- Miku – vocals
- Bou – guitar
- Kanon – bass guitar
- Teruki – drums
