= Calendula Requiem =

Single by Kanon x Kanon
- B-side: "The Doll House!"
- Released: November 23, 2010
- Recorded: 2010
- Genre: Synthpop
- Length: 17:00
- Label: Sony Music Japan
- Producer: Kanon (An Cafe)

Kanon Wakeshima singles chronology
"Suna No Oshiro" (2008)	"Calendula Requiem" (2010)	"Koi no Doutei" (2011)

Kanon (An Cafe) singles chronology
"Natsu Koi ★ Natsu Game" (2009)	"Calendula Requiem" (2010)	"Koi no Doutei" (2011)

"Calendula Requiem" (カレンデュラ レクイエム) is the first single from singer and cellist Kanon Wakeshima and An Cafe bassist Kanon's duo group Kanon x Kanon, and Wakeshima's third overall single. The song was used as the second theme song for the anime adaptation of Shiki.

== Track listing ==
No.	Title	Length
1.	"Calendula Requiem (カレンデュラ レクイエム)"	5:18
2.	"The Doll House! (ザ ドールハウス!)"	3:28
3.	"Umigame Soup (ウミガメスープ)"	2:20
4.	"Calendula Requiem (カレンデュラ レクイエム)" (Instrumental Version)	5:16
Total length:		17:00

== Personnel ==
- Kanon Wakeshima – Vocals, Cello, Piano, Lyrics
- Kanon - Bass, Lyrics, Production
