= Shikisai Moment =

Studio album by An Cafe
- Released: November 9, 2005
- Genre: Rock
- Length: 51:17
- Label: Loop Ash

An Cafe chronology
Amedama Rock (2005)	Shikisai Moment (2005)	Magnya Carta (2006)

Shikisai Moment (色彩モーメント, shikisai mōmento) is the first full-length studio album released by An Cafe on November 9, 2005. The album peaked at No. 39 on the Japanese albums chart.

== Track listing ==
All lyrics are written by Miku

Disc one (CD)
No.	Title	Lyrics	Music	Length
1.	"Opening (Shikisai Ver.)" (オープ○ング(色彩Ver.))			1:16
2.	"Merrymaking" (メリメイキング)	Miku	Kanon	5:03
3.	"Escapism (Shikisai Ver.)" (エスケピズム (色彩Ver.))	Miku	Bou	4:54
4.	"Ippatsu Gyakuten Renai Game" (一発逆転恋愛ゲーム)		Kanon	3:32
5.	"Golden Wing"		Teruki	4:34
6.	"Rinne no Tsumi" (輪廻の罪)		Teruki	6:00
7.	"Omocha" (玩具)		Kanon	3:31
8.	"Tekesuta Kousen" (テケスタ光線)		Kanon	4:54
9.	"Nyappy in the World"		Kanon	4:09
10.	"1/2"		Bou	4:04
11.	"Wagamama Kōshinkyoku" (我侭行進曲)		Bou	4:48
12.	"My Favourite Beat (hidden track)" (マイフェイバリット☆ビート)		vocals by Bou, Teruki, Kanon	4:32

Disc two (DVD)
No.	Title	Length
1.	"Antic Room no.1"
2.	"Wagamama Kōshinkyoku" (Music video)
3.	"Antic Room no.2"
4.	"Tekesuta Kousen" (Music video)
5.	"Antic Room no.3"
6.	"Escapism" (Music video)
7.	"Antic Room no.4"
8.	"Merrymaking" (Music video)

== Personnel ==
- Miku – vocals
- Bou – guitar
- Kanon – bass guitar
- Teruki – drums
