= BB Parallel World =

Studio album by An Cafe
- Released: September 9, 2009 (JP)
- Genres: Pop rock; dance-rock
- Length: 41:30
- Label: Loop Ash

An Cafe chronology
Gokutama Rock Cafe (2008)	BB Parallel World (2009)	Antic Cafe (2009)

BB Parallel World (BBパラレルワールド, BB Parareru Wārudo) is the fourth studio album released by An Cafe on September 9, 2009, in Japan and on October 2, 2009, in Europe. A limited edition was released as well, containing an additional DVD with several music videos. The album peaked at No. 20 on the Japanese albums chart.

== Track listing ==
All lyrics are written by Miku.

Disc one (CD)
No.	Title	Lyrics	Music	Length
1.	"Let's Brand New Wave"	Miku	Takuya	3:50
2.	"Natsu Koi Natsu Game" (夏恋★夏GAME)	Miku	Takuya	4:06
3.	"Ichigo" (苺)	Miku	Teruki	3:55
4.	"Passion!!"	Miku	Takuya	3:54
5.	"NYAPPY In The Parallel World"	Miku	Takuya	4:42
6.	"Alone"	Miku	Takuya	5:02
7.	"Aroma"	Miku	An Cafe	4:40
8.	"Death Is The Way Of The Samurai Warrior" (Bushido To Iu Wa Shinukoto To Mitsuketari, 武士道とい云ふは死ぬ事と見付けたり)	Miku	Teruki	3:48
9.	"Summer Dive ~Sweet-Melty Peach☆Beach~"	Miku	Teruki	4:37
10.	"My ♥ Leaps For "C""	Miku	An Cafe	3:34
11.	"You"	Miku	An Cafe	5:10

Disc two (DVD, limited edition only)
No.	Title	Length
1.	"Natsu Koi ★ Natsu GAME" (Music video)	4:13
2.	"Kawayu's Rock 20090517 At Tokyo Big Sight Live" (Live footage)	3:31
3.	"Tekesuta Kōsen" (Music video)	5:26
4.	"Escapism" (Music video)	5:21
5.	"Merrymaking" (Music video)	5:47

== Personnel ==
- Miku – vocals
- Takuya – guitar
- Kanon – bass
- Teruki – drums
- Yuuki – keyboard
