= Killy Killy Joker =

Single by Kanon Wakeshima

from the album Tsukinami
- B-side: "Moonlight Party"
- Released: April 30, 2014
- Recorded: 2014
- Genre: Pop
- Length: 16:26
- Label: Warner Music Japan

Kanon Wakeshima singles chronology
"Signal" (2014)	"Killy Killy Joker" (2014)	"World's End, Girl's Rondo" (2014)

"Killy Killy Joker" is the fifth single released by Japanese singer and cellist Kanon Wakeshima, and third single from her album, Tsukinami. The song was used as an opening for the anime Selector Infected WIXOSS. The song peaked at #34 on the Oricon Singles Chart and stayed on the chart for eight weeks.

== Track listing ==
CD
No.	Title	Length
1.	"Killy Killy Joker"	4:41
2.	"Moonlight Party"	3:34
3.	"Killy Killy Joker" (Instrumental)	4:41
4.	"Moonlight Party" (Instrumental)	3:30
Total length:		16:26

== Personnel ==
- Kanon Wakeshima – Vocals, Cello, Piano, Lyrics
