= Tommy's Halloween Fairy Tale =

- Tommy heavenly^{6} Version

EP by Tomoko Kawase
- Released: October 21, 2015
- Recorded: 2014–2015
- Genre: Pop punk; synthpop
- Label: House of TMY Records (UMJ)
- Producer: Chiffon Brownie; Tomoko Kawase

Tommy heavenly^{6} chronology
Tommy Ice Cream Heaven Forever (2013)	Tommy's Halloween Fairy Tale (2015)

Tommy february^{6} Version

Tommy february^{6} chronology
Tommy Candy Shop Sugar Me (2013)	Tommy's Halloween Fairy Tale (2015)

"Tommy's Halloween Fairy Tale" is the second solo EP by Tomoko Kawase, released October 21, 2015 through House of TMY Records (UMJ). The EP features songs from both the Tommy heavenly^{6} and Tommy february^{6} personas. The EP peaked at #28 on the Oricon Albums Chart and stayed on the chart for two weeks.

== Track listing ==
All lyrics written by Tomoko Kawase, except "The Sparkling Candy Man" by Kawase and James De Barrado, all music written by Shunsaku Okuda.

No.	Title	Length
1.	"Tommy's Halloween Fairy Tale" (Opening)	1:20
2.	"Living Dead Diner Girls" (Tommy heavenly^{6})	4:10
3.	"The Sparkling Candy Man †"	3:50
4.	"Follow the White Rabbit!" (Instrumental)	0:33
5.	"Little Red Forest" (Tommy february^{6})	4:00
6.	"Frozen Raspberry Snow"	3:19
