= World's End, Girl's Rondo =

Single by Kanon Wakeshima

from the album Tsukinami
- Released: October 15, 2014
- Recorded: 2014
- Genre: Neoclassical, Dark ambient
- Length: 17:36
- Label: Warner Music Japan

Kanon Wakeshima singles chronology
"Killy Killy Joker" (2014)	"World's End, Girl's Rondo" (2014)	"Right Light Rise" (2015)

"World's End, Girl's Rondo" is the sixth single released by Japanese singer and cellist Kanon Wakeshima, and fourth single from her album, Tsukinami. The song was used as an opening for the anime Selector Spread WIXOSS. The song peaked at number 17 on the Oricon Singles Chart and stayed on the chart for six weeks.

== Track listing ==
No.	Title	Length
1.	"World's End, Girl's Rondo"	4:28
2.	"Continue"	4:22
3.	"World's End, Girl's Rondo" (Instrumental Version)	4:28
4.	"Continue" (Instrumental Version)	4:18
Total length:		17:36

== Personnel ==
- Kanon Wakeshima – Vocals, Cello, Piano, Lyrics
