= Snow Scene =

Single by Antic Cafe

from the album Magnya Carta
- B-side: "Bokura no Poppopoo"
- Released: October 18, 2006
- Genre: Pop rock
- Label: Loop Ash
- Songwriter(s): Teruki Nagata, Kazuhiko Bou Saito, Shinya Sano, Akiharu Tsukiyama

Antic Cafe singles chronology
"Smile Ichiban Ii Onna" (2006)	"Snow Scene" (2006)	"Kakusei Heroism" (2007)

"Snow Scene" (スノーシーン, sunō shīn) is the eleventh single by Japanese band Antic Cafe. The title track is featured on the album Magnya Carta. The song peaked at No. 26 on the Japanese singles chart.

== Track listing ==
Disc one

1. "Snow Scene" (スノーシーン)
2. "Bokura no Poppopo!" (僕らのポッポポー！)

Disc two (DVD)

1. "Smile Ichiban Ii Onna (“Yagai de Nyappy” Live Ver.)" (スマイル一番 イイ♀("野外でニャッピー"Live Ver.))
