= Koi no Doutei =

Single by Kanon x Kanon
- B-side: "'Renai no Susume'"
- Released: June 28, 2011
- Recorded: 2011
- Genre: Synthpop
- Length: 19:00
- Label: Sony Music Japan
- Producer: Kanon (An Cafe)

Kanon Wakeshima singles chronology
"Calendula Requiem" (2010)	"Koi no Doutei" (2011)	"Halloween Party" (2012)

Kanon (An Cafe) singles chronology
"Calendula Requiem" (2010)	"Koi no Doutei" (2011)	""Bee Myself; Bee Yourself"" (2013)

"Koi no Doutei" (恋の道程) is the second single from singer and cellist Kanon Wakeshima and An Cafe bassist Kanon's duo group Kanon x Kanon, and Wakeshima's fourth overall single. The song was used as the opening song for the anime adaption of 30-sai no Hoken Taiiku.

== Track listing ==
No.	Title	Length
1.	"Koi no Doutei (恋の道程)"	3:49
2.	"Renai no Susume (恋愛のスゝメ)"	4:08
3.	"Koi no Doutei (恋の道程)" (TV SIZE Version)	1:33
4.	"Koi no Doutei (恋の道程)" (madmaid 17's DT Bassline remix)	5:20
5.	"Koi no Doutei (恋の道程)" (Instrumental Version)	3:49
Total length:		19:00

== Personnel ==
- Kanon Wakeshima – Vocals, Cello, Piano, Lyrics
- Kanon - Bass, Lyrics, Production
