= Signal (Kanon Wakeshima song) =

Single by Kanon Wakeshima

from the album Tsukinami
- B-side: "Mujuryoku"
- Released: February 19, 2014
- Recorded: 2014
- Genre: Neoclassical, Dark ambient
- Length: 20:06
- Label: Warner Music Japan

Kanon Wakeshima singles chronology
"Foul Play ni Kurari / Sakura Meikyuu" (2012)	"Signal" (2014)	"Killy Killy Joker" (2014)

"Signal" is the fourth single released by Japanese singer and cellist Kanon Wakeshima, and second single from her album, Tsukinami. The song "Signal" was used as the second ending theme of the anime television series Strike the Blood. The song reached number 54 on the Oricon Singles Chart and stayed on the chart for two weeks.

== Track listing ==
CD
No.	Title	Length
1.	"Signal"	5:30
2.	"Mujuryoku (無重力, Weightless)"	4:34
3.	"Signal" (Instrumental)	5:29
4.	"Mujuryoku (無重力, Weightless)" (Instrumental)	4:33
Total length:		20:06

DVD
No.	Title	Length
1.	"Signal" (Music Video)
2.	"Making of the "Signal" Music Video"
3.	"Signal" TV Spot"

== Personnel ==
- Kanon Wakeshima – vocals, cello, piano, lyrics
