= Kakusei Heroism =

"Kakusei Heroism: The Hero Without a 'Name'"
- Type A album art

Single by An Cafe
- B-side: "Respect Mommy"
- Released: August 22, 2007
- Recorded: Magnet Studio; Sound Atelier
- Genre: Rock, pop
- Length: 9:18
- Label: Loop Ash, Music Ray'n Inc.
- Songwriters: Miku, Teruki, Kanon
- Producer: An Cafe

An Cafe singles chronology
| "Snow Scene" (2006) | "Kakusei Heroism: The Hero Without a 'Name'" (2007) | "Ryuusei Rocket" (2007) |

Type B cover art

Type C cover art

"Kakusei Heroism (The Hero Without a "Name")" (覚醒ヒロイズム～THE HERO WITHOUT A "NAME"～, Kakusei Hiroizumu za Hiirō Uizauto a Nēmu) is the twelfth single by Japanese band An Cafe. The single is available in three types, two including different bonus DVDs, and one with a bonus live track. The title track is the second opening theme of the anime series, Darker than Black. "Kakusei Heroism" marks the debut of guitarist Takuya and keyboardist Yuuki after the departure of Bou. The song peaked at No. 13 on the Japanese singles chart and is their biggest selling single.

== Track listing ==
=== Type A (Regular Edition) ===
Disc One

1. "Kakusei Heroism (The Hero Without a "Name") (覚醒ヒロイズム ~The Hero Without a "Name"~)
2. "Respect Mommy: Hito no Yaku Tatereba ii Jibun no Tokui na Koto de" (リスペクトマミー ～人の役 立てればいい 自分の得意なことで～)

Disc Two

1. "Kakusei Heroism" (Music Clip) (覚醒ヒロイズム Music Clip)

=== Type B (Limited Edition) ===
Disc One

1. "Kakusei Heroism (The Hero Without a "Name") (覚醒ヒロイズム ~The Hero Without a "Name"~)
2. "Respect Mommy: Hito no Yaku Tatereba ii Jibun no Tokui na Koto de" (リスペクトマミー ～人の役 立てればいい 自分の得意なことで～)

Disc Two

1. "Darker Than Black Clip"

=== Type C (Limited Edition) ===
1. "Kakusei Heroism (The Hero Without a "Name") (覚醒ヒロイズム ~The Hero Without a "Name"~)
2. "Respect Mommy: Hito no Yaku Tatereba ii Jibun no Tokui na Koto de" (リスペクトマミー ～人の役 立てればいい 自分の得意なことで～)
3. "Orange Dream: Bonds Live Ver." (オレンジドリーム ～Bonds Live Ver.～)

== Personnel ==
- Miku – vocals
- Takuya – guitar
- Kanon – bass guitar
- Yuuki – electronic keyboard
- Teruki – drums
- Shigeki Kashii – mixing engineer, recording engineer
- Gen Okamura – recording engineer
- Hiroaki Ohgushi – recording engineer
- Yuji Chinone – mastering engineer
