= Still Doll =

Single by Kanon Wakeshima

from the album Shinshoku Dolce
- B-side: "Kuroi Torikago"
- Released: May 28, 2008
- Recorded: March 2008
- Genre: Neoclassical, Dark ambient
- Length: 8:23
- Label: Defstar
- Producer(s): Mana

Kanon Wakeshima singles chronology
| "Still Doll" (2008) | "Suna No Oshiro" (2008) |

"Still Doll" is the debut single from singer and cellist Kanon Wakeshima. The song was used as the ending theme for the anime adaptation of the manga series Vampire Knight. The single peaked at number 33 on the Oricon singles chart.

== Track listing ==
| No. | Title | Length |
|---|---|---|
| 1. | "Still Doll" | 3:19 |
| 2. | "Kuroi Torikago (黒い鳥籠, Black Bird Cage)" | 2:54 |
| 3. | "Still Doll" (Music Box Version) | 2:10 |
| Total length: | | 8:23 |

== Personnel ==
- Kanon Wakeshima – Vocals, Cello, Piano, Lyrics, and a bunch of other instruments such as an oboe and a trumpet
- Mana – Production
