= Be My Valentine (Lovely Valentine's Day) =

Single by Tommy february^{6}

from the album Tommy Candy Shop
- B-side: "Ai no ♥ Ai no Hoshi"
- Released: February 6, 2013
- Recorded: 2012
- Genre: Pop
- Length: 9:29
- Label: Warner Music Japan
- Songwriter(s): Tomoko Kawase, James "JJ" De Barrado
- Producer(s): Malibu Convertible

Tommy february^{6} singles chronology
"Halloween Party" (2012)	"Be My Valentine (Lovely Valentine's Day)" (2013)	"Cupcake Angels" (2018)

"Be My Valentine (Lovely Valentine's Day)" is the ninth single by Tommy february^{6}. It was released February 6, 2013 as a Valentine's Day single. The song debuted at number 26 on the Oricon weekly singles chart selling 4,022 copies in its first week.

== Track list ==
No.	Title	Writer(s)	Producer(s)	Length
1.	"Be My Valentine"	Tomoko Kawase, James "JJ" De Barrado	Malibu Convertible	6:00
2.	"Ai no ♥ Ai no Hoshi" (愛の♥愛の星; Star of Love)	Tomoko Kawase	Malibu Convertible	3:29
Total length:				9:29

Notes

- "Ai no ♥ Ai no Hoshi" was originally performed by Tommy's band, the brilliant green.
