= Right Light Rise =

Single by Kanon Wakeshima

from the album Luminescence Q.E.D.
- B-side: "Mayday!"
- Released: April 29, 2015
- Recorded: 2015
- Genre: Neoclassical, Dark ambient
- Label: Warner Music Japan

Kanon Wakeshima singles chronology
"World's End, Girl's Rondo" (2014)	"Right Light Rise" (2015)	"Kimi wa Soleil" (2015)

"Right Light Rise" is the seventh single released by Japanese singer and cellist Kanon Wakeshima. The song was used as an ending theme for the first season of the Is It Wrong to Try to Pick Up Girls in a Dungeon? anime television series. The song peaked at number 50 on the Oricon Singles Chart and stayed on the chart for six weeks.

== Track listing ==
CD
No.	Title	Length
1.	"Right Light Rise"
2.	"Mayday!"
3.	"Right Light Rise" (Instrumental)
4.	"Mayday!" (Instrumental)

DVD
No.	Title	Length
1.	"Right Light Rise" (Music Video)
2.	"Right Light Rise" (TV Spot)

== Personnel ==
- Kanon Wakeshima – Vocals, Cello, Piano, Lyrics
