= Suna no Oshiro =

Single by Kanon Wakeshima

from the album Shinshoku Dolce
- B-side: "'skip turn step♪'"
- Released: November 12, 2008
- Recorded: 2008
- Genre: Neoclassical dark wave, Dark ambient
- Length: 19:00
- Label: Defstar
- Producer: Mana

Kanon Wakeshima singles chronology
"Still Doll" (2008)	"Suna no Oshiro" (2008)	"Calendula Requiem" (2010)

"Suna no Oshiro" (砂のお城, Sand Castle) is the second single from singer and cellist Kanon Wakeshima. The song was used as the second ending theme for the anime adaptation of the manga series Vampire Knight. The single peaked at number 39 on the Oricon singles chart.

== Track listing ==
No.	Title	Length
1.	"Suna no Oshiro (砂のお城, Sand Castle)"	3:10
2.	"skip turn step♪"	4:37
3.	"Suna no Oshiro (砂のお城, Sand Castle)" (Instrumental Version)	3:10
4.	"skip turn step♪" (Instrumental Version)	4:34
5.	"Suna no Oshiro (砂のお城, Sand Castle)" (Music Box Version)	2:39
Total length:		19:00

== Personnel ==
- Kanon Wakeshima – Vocals, Cello, Piano, Lyrics
- Mana – Production
