= Cherry Saku Yūki!! =

Single by An Cafe
- Released: February 27, 2008
- Label: Loop Ash
- Songwriters: Teruki Nagata (Teruki), Akiharu Tsukiyama (Miku)
- Producer: An Cafe

An Cafe singles chronology
"Ryūsei Rocket" (2007)	"Cherry Saku Yūki!!" (2008)	"Aroma" (2009)

"Cherry Saku Yūki!!" (Cherry咲く勇気!!) is a single by Japanese band An Cafe. The single comes in two editions, the limited including a bonus DVD. The song peaked at No. 20 on the Japanese singles chart.

== Track listing ==
Disc one (CD)

1. "Cherry Saku Yūki!!" (Cherry咲く勇気!!)
2. "One Way Love"
3. "Cherry Saku Yūki!! (Instrumental)" (Cherry咲く勇気!! (Instrumental))
4. "One Way Love (Instrumental)"

Disc two (DVD, Limited edition only)

1. "Cherry Saku Yūki!!" (Cherry咲く勇気!!)

== Personnel ==
- Miku – vocals
- Takuya – guitar
- Kanon – bass guitar
- Yuuki – electronic keyboard
- Teruki – drums
