= Ryūsei Rocket =

- Regular edition cover

Single by An Cafe
- Released: November 7, 2007
- Genre: Rock/pop
- Length: 17:18
- Label: Loop Ash, Music Ray'n Inc.
- Songwriters: Teruki Nagata, Akiharu Tsukiyama
- Producer: An Cafe

An Cafe singles chronology
| "Kakusei Heroism" (2007) | "Ryūsei Rocket" (2007) | "Cherry Saku Yūki!!" (2008) |

Alternative cover
- Limited edition cover

"Ryūsei Rocket" (流星ロケット, Ryūsei Roketto) is a single by the Japanese band An Cafe. The title track is the opening theme in the drama Fuma no Kojirou. The song peaked at No. 19 on the Japanese singles chart.

== Track listing ==
Disc one (CD)

1. "Ryūsei Rocket" (流星ロケット) – 4:35
2. "Koi no Dependence" (恋のディペンデンス) – 4:05
3. "Ryūsei Rocket (Instrumental)" (流星ロケット (Instrumental)) – 4:35
4. "Koi no Dependence (Instrumental)" (恋のディペンデンス (Instrumental)) – 4:05

Disc two (DVD, limited edition only)

1. "Ryūsei Rocket Clip" (流星ロケット)

== Personnel ==
- Miku – vocals
- Takuya – guitar
- Kanon – bass guitar
- Yuuki – electronic keyboard
- Teruki – drums
