= Love Your Enemies (song) =

Single by Kanon Wakeshima

from the album Luminescence Q.E.D.
- Released: February 10, 2016
- Recorded: 2016
- Genre: Neoclassical, Dark ambient
- Label: Warner Home Video
- Producer: Chiba Naoki

Kanon Wakeshima singles chronology
"Kimi wa Soleil" (2015)	"Love Your Enemies" (2016)	"Unbalance by Me" (2016)

"Love Your Enemies" is the ninth single released by Japanese singer and cellist Kanon Wakeshima. The song was used as an ending theme for the film Selector Destructed WIXOSS. The song peaked at number 24 on the Oricon Singles Chart and stayed on the chart for five weeks.

== Overview ==
Theme song for the animated film "selector destructed WIXOSS" released on February 13, 2016. It debuted at No. 22 on the Oricon Chart dated February 22 of the same year. It includes remix versions of the theme songs for the first and second seasons of the "selector" TV series as a coupling song. The remixes were done by Maiko Iuchi, who was in charge of the music for "selector".

The limited first edition artist disc comes with a DVD containing the music video and the movie trailer, and some stores offer a promo card for the trading card game "WIXOSS" released by Takara Tomy, "Doomsday Kaisen Chelon" (PR-283), which was illustrated by Bunshima himself.

== Overview ==
Theme song for the animated film "selector destructed WIXOSS" released on February 13, 2016. It debuted at No. 22 on the Oricon Chart dated February 22 of the same year. It includes remix versions of the theme songs for the first and second seasons of the "selector" TV series, as a coupling song. The remixes were done by Maiko Iuchi, who was in charge of the music for "selector".

The limited first edition artist disc comes with a DVD containing the music video and the movie trailer, and some stores offer a promo card for the trading card game "WIXOSS" released by Takara Tomy, "Doomsday Kaisen Chelon" (PR-283), which was illustrated by Bunshima himself.

== Track listing ==
CD
No.	Title	Length
1.	"Love Your Enemies"
2.	"Killy Killy Joker" (Remix)
3.	"World's End, Girl's Rondo" (Remix)
4.	"Love Your Enemies" (Instrumental)

DVD
No.	Title	Length
1.	"Love Your Enemies" (Music Video)
2.	"Gekijou-ban "selector destructed WIXOSS"

== Personnel ==
- Kanon Wakeshima – Vocals, Cello, Piano, Lyrics
