= Foul Play ni Kurari / Sakura Meikyuu =

Single by Kanon Wakeshima

from the album Tsukinami
- Released: November 7, 2012
- Recorded: 2012
- Genre: Neoclassical, Dark ambient
- Length: 19:00
- Label: Warner Music Japan

Kanon Wakeshima singles chronology
"Halloween Party" (2012)	"Foul Play ni Kurari / Sakura Meikyuu" (2012)	"Signal" (2014)

"Foul Play ni Kurari" / "Sakura Meikyuu" (Japanese: ファールプレーにくらり／サクラメイキュウ, Fāru Purē ni Kurari / Sakura Meikyū) is a double A-side single released by singer and cellist Kanon Wakeshima. It is Kanon's third single, and first single for her album Tsukinami. "Foul Play ni Kurari" was used as an ending theme song for the anime To Love-Ru Darkness, and "Sakura Meikyuu" was used as the theme song for the game Fate/Extra CCC. The song peaked at number 35 on the Oricon Singles Chart and stayed on the chart for four weeks.

== Track listing ==
No.	Title	Length
1.	"Foul Play ni Kurari (ファールプレーにくらり)"	4:29
2.	"Sakura Meikyuu (サクラメイキュウ)"	4:36
3.	"Foul Play ni Kurari (ファールプレーにくらり)" (Instrumental Version)	4:29
4.	"Sakura Meikyuu (サクラメイキュウ)" (Instrumental Version)	4:34
Total length:		19:00

== Personnel ==
- Kanon Wakeshima – vocals, cello, piano, lyrics
