= Kimi wa Soleil =

Single by Kanon Wakeshima

from the album Luminescence Q.E.D.
- B-side: "Princess Charleston"
- Released: November 25, 2015
- Genre: Neoclassical, Dark ambient
- Label: Warner Music Japan
- Producer(s): Furukawa Takahiro

Kanon Wakeshima singles chronology
"Right Light Rise" (2015)	"Kimi wa Soleil" (2015)	"Love Your Enemies" (2016)

"Kimi wa Soleil" is the eighth single released by Japanese singer and cellist Kanon Wakeshima. The song was used as an ending theme for the anime Strike the Blood. The song peaked at number 64 on the Oricon Singles Chart and stayed on the chart for two weeks.

== Track listing ==
CD
No.	Title	Length
1.	"You Are the Sun (君はソレイユ, Kimi wa Solei)"
2.	"Princess Charleston"
3.	"You Are the Sun (君はソレイユ, Kimi wa Solei)" (Instrumental)
4.	"Princess Charleston" (Instrumental)

DVD
No.	Title	Length
1.	"You Are the Sun (君はソレイユ, Kimi wa Solei)" (Music Video)

== Personnel ==
- Kanon Wakeshima – Vocals, Cello, Piano, Lyrics
