= Lolitawork Libretto =

Studio album by Kanon Wakeshima
- Released: July 27, 2010
- Recorded: 2009–2010
- Genre: Neoclassical dark wave
- Length: 46:00
- Label: DefStar Records

Kanon Wakeshima chronology
Shinshoku Dolce (2009)	Lolitawork Libretto (2010)	Tsukinami (2015)

"Lolitawork Libretto" (少女仕掛けのリブレット, Shoujo Jikake no Riburetto) is the second studio album by singer and cellist Kanon Wakeshima. The song "Toumei no Kagi" was released as a digital download prior to the release of the album on September 16, 2009. The song was used as the theme song of the online game Avalon no Kagi. A promotional music video for the song "Lolitawork Libretto ~Storytelling by Solita~" was also released prior to the album.

The album charted at No. 83 on the Oricon Albums Charts and only charted for one week.

The official full title of the album is "Lolitawork Libretto: A Libretto on What Makes a Girl Work" (少女仕掛けのリブレット 〜LOLITAWORK LIBRETTO〜).

== Track listing ==
No.	Title	Length
1.	"Shakespeare no Wasuremono (シェークスピアの忘れ物, The thing Shakespeare forgot) ～Prologue～"	2:00
2.	"Kajitsu no Keikoku (果実の警告, Warning from Fruit)"	3:05
3.	"Dokushouka Himegimi (読書家姫君, Heroine Syndrome)"	3:47
4.	"Twinkle Star!"	3:20
5.	"Toumei no Kagi (透明の鍵, Transparent Key)"	3:29
6.	"Mamaredo Sukai (マーマレードスカイ, Marmalade Sky)"	3:38
7.	"Kuroneko to Pianist no Tango (黒猫とピアニストのタンゴ, The Black Cat & the tango from the Pianist)"	3:09
8.	"Hime Charleston (プリンセスチャールストン, Princess Charleston)"	4:14
9.	"Tree of Sorrow"	3:33
10.	"Celmisia"	4:25
11.	"Otome no March (音女のマーチ, March of the Maiden)"	4:41
12.	"Shakespeare no Wasuremono (シェークスピアの忘れ物, The thing Shakespeare forgot) ～Epilogue～"	1:44
13.	"Shoujo Jikake no Riburetto (少女仕掛けのリブレット, Lolitawork Libretto) ～Storytelling by Solita～"	4:05
Total length:		46:00

== Personnel ==
- Kanon Wakeshima – Vocals, Cello, Lyrics, Composition
- Mana - Production, Composition, Arrangement, Programming (tracks 2~7,9,13)
- Microman - Production, Composition, Arrangement, Programming (tracks 1,8,11,12)
- Luca - Production, Arrangement, Programming (track 10)
