= Shinshoku Dolce =

Studio album by Kanon Wakeshima
- Released: February 11, 2009
- Recorded: March – November 2008
- Genre: Neoclassical dark wave
- Length: 41:00
- Label: DefStar Records
- Producer: Mana

Kanon Wakeshima chronology
Shinshoku Dolce (2009)	Lolitawork Libretto (2010)

Singles from Shinshoku Dolce
- 1. "Still Doll" Released: May 28, 2008; 2. "Suna no Oshiro" Released: November 12, 2008

"Shinshoku Dolce" ("侵食ドルチェ, Sweetness Violation) is the debut album by singer and cellist Kanon Wakeshima. The album was preceded by two singles: "Still Doll" and "Suna no Oshiro." Both of those singles were used in the anime Vampire Knight. The success of these singles earned Kanon a nomination for the Best Newcomer award at the fourth annual Shōjo Beat Music Awards.

The album was released on February 11, 2009, in Germany, France, and Europe. It was then released on February 18, 2009, in Japan, available in both Limited and Regular editions. The limited edition of the CD included a DVD of her videos "Suna No Oshiro" and "Still Doll."

== Track listing ==
No.	Title	Length
1.	"Sweet Ticket"	1:19
2.	"Shinku no Fetarizumu (真紅のフェータリズム, Crimson Fatalism)"	2:51
3.	"Kagami (鏡, Mirror)"	3:07
4.	"Still Doll" (Album Version)	3:44
5.	"Maboroshi (マボロシ, Illusion)"	3:40
6.	"Ennui Kibun! (アンニュイ気分!, Dull Mood!)"	3:19
7.	"Suna no Oshiro (砂のお城, Sand Castle)"	3:09
8.	"Monochrome Frame"	3:50
9.	"L'espoir ~Mahou no Akai Ito~ (L'espoir ～魔法の赤い糸～, Hope ~Special Red Thread~)"	3:13
10.	"Kuroi Torikago (黒い鳥籠, Black Bird Cage)"	2:54
11.	"skip turn step♪"	4:36
12.	"Shiroi Kokoro (白い心, White Heart)"	3:22
13.	"Sweet Dreams"	1:34
Total length:		41:00

Limited Edition DVD
No.	Title	Length
1.	"Still Doll"	3:44
2.	"Suna no Oshiro (砂のお城, Sand Castle)"	3:09

== Personnel ==
- Kanon Wakeshima – Vocals, Cello, Piano, Lyrics
- Mana – Production
