= Unbalance by Me =

Single by Kanon Wakeshima
- B-side: PINOCCHIO with FREE FALL (自由落下とピノキオ)
- Released: May 7, 2016
- Genre: Neoclassical, Dark ambient
- Label: Warner Music Japan
- Producer(s): Chiba Naoki

Kanon Wakeshima singles chronology
"Love Your Enemies" (2016)	"Unbalance by Me" (2016)

"Unbalance by Me" is the tenth single released by Japanese singer and cellist Kanon Wakeshima. It was released May 7, 2016.

== Track listing ==
CD
No.	Title	Length
1.	"Unbalance by Me"
2.	"PINOCCHIO with FREE FALL (自由落下とピノキオ)"
3.	"Unbalance by Me" (Instrumental)
4.	"PINOCCHIO with FREE FALL (自由落下とピノキオ)" (Instrumental)

== Personnel ==
- Kanon Wakeshima – Vocals, Cello, Piano, Lyrics
