= Kanon Wakeshima =

Japanese musician and singer (born 1988)

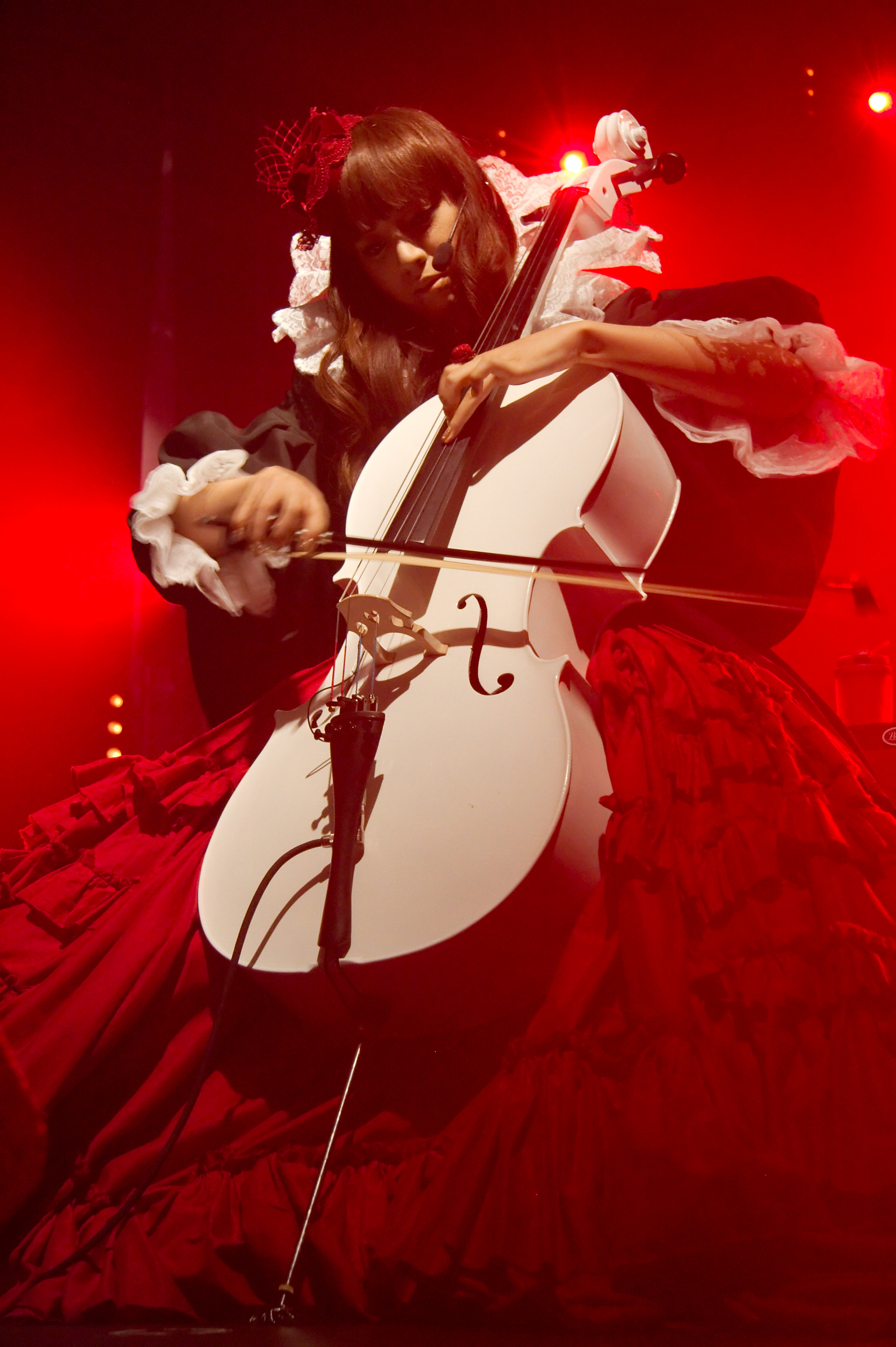
- Kanon Wakeshima performing at Japan Expo 2009

Background information
- Born: June 28, 1988 (age 38)
- Origin: Tokyo, Japan
- Genres: Baroque pop; neoclassical darkwave; dark ambient; synthpop
- Occupations: Musician; singer
- Instruments: Vocals; cello; piano
- Years active: 2008-present
- Labels: DefStar Records; Warner Home Video
- Website: Official Site

Kanon Wakeshima (分島 花音, Wakeshima Kanon; born June 28, 1988) is a Japanese musician and singer. Originally produced by musician and fashion designer Mana, Wakeshima debuted under the DefStar Records label on May 28, 2008, with the single "Still Doll", the ending theme for the anime adaptation of the manga series Vampire Knight. She also provided the voice for a maid that appears in the eighth episode of the series. Wakeshima's second single "Suna no Oshiro", released on November 12, 2008, was used as the ending theme for the series' second season (subtitled Guilty).

She was nominated for a Best Newcomer award for 2008 in the fourth annual Shōjo Beat Music Awards, nominees of which are determined by surveying "record companies, music journalists, music experts, and music fans".

== Life and career ==
=== Early life ===
At the age of three, she began learning cello, marking her entry into the world of music. In junior high school she formed her own ensemble group. At the age of fifteen, she transited from her former classical ensembles into playing in the baroque section. Appearing in a variety of recitals and concerts throughout her school years, she began writing her own music and combining singing with her cello playing at the age of sixteen. As she transited from junior high school to high school, she began writing her own music and singing. She gave her first vocal performances during a high school festival.

=== Debut and Shinshoku Dolce ===
Wakeshima auditioned at Sony Music Entertainment as a singer, originally not intending to include her cello playing with her demo tape, but later changed her mind after experimenting with performing with the piano. She became a finalist at the audition, contracting with the Sony subsidiary DefStar Records and debuting on May 28, 2008, with her first single, "Still Doll". The single was chosen as the ending theme for the first season of the anime adaptation of Vampire Knight. She also provided the voice for a maid that appears in the eighth episode of the series.

Wakeshima released her second single, "Suna No Oshiro", on November 12, 2008. The song was used as the second ending theme for Vampire Knight.

Wakeshima was nominated for a Best Newcomer award for 2008 in the fourth annual Shōjo Beat Music Awards, nominees of which are determined by surveying "record companies, music journalists, music experts, and music fans".

Wakeshima released her debut album, Shinshoku Dolce, on February 11, 2009. The same year, she performed at Japan Expo in Paris, France, and at Otakon in Baltimore, Maryland. In July 2009, she presented her first gallery showing of original art at Royal/T in Culver City, California.

=== Lolitawork Libretto ===
The song "Toumei no Kagi" was released as a digital single on September 16, 2009. The song was used as the theme song of the online game Avalon no Kagi.

On July 27, 2010, Wakeshima released her second album, Lolitawork Libretto along with a music video for the song "Lolitawork Libretto ~Storytelling by Solita~".

=== Kanon x Kanon ===
In 2010, Wakeshima formed a duo with An Cafe's bassist Kanon, called Kanon x Kanon. The duo sang the second theme song for the anime adaptation of Shiki, called "Calendula Requiem", which was released November 23, 2010.

On June 28, 2011, Kanon x Kanon released their second single, "Koi no Doutei", which was used as the opening theme song for the anime 30-sai no Hoken Taiiku.

Wakeshima was also invited to AM² 2011, an anime convention in Anaheim, where she performed concerts both solo and with Kanon x Kanon. Following AM², she also appeared at Hyper Japan 2011 in London in July and in Ani-Com and Games Hong Kong 2011.

At the end of 2011 Wakeshima went on her first European tour with Kanon x Kanon.

=== Tsukinami ===
Wakeshima released a solo double a-side single on November 7, 2012, called Foul Play ni Kurari / Sakura Meikyuu. "Foul Play ni Kurari" was used as the ending theme song for the anime To Love-Ru Darkness, and "Sakura Meikyuu" was used as the theme song for game Fate / Extra CCC.

On January 25, 2013, Wakeshima played at the Japanese Embassy in Seoul, Korea. Kanon performed at Animethon 2013 in Edmonton, Alberta.

In November 2013, Wakeshima started on "The Strange Treat!" tour. She covered hide's song "Beauty & Stupid" for the December 2013 tribute album Tribute VI -Female Spirits-.

In February 2014, Wakeshima released her fourth single, "Signal", which was used as the new ending of the anime television series Strike the Blood.

Wakeshima released her fifth single, "Killy Killy Joker", on April 30, 2014, which was used as an opening theme for the anime television series Selector Infected WIXOSS.

Wakeshima released her sixth single, "World's End, Girl's Rondo", on October 15, 2014. The song was used as an opening for the anime Selector Spread WIXOSS.

Wakeshima released her third studio album, Tsukinami, on February 25, 2015.

=== Luminescence Q.E.D. ===
Wakeshima released her seventh single, "Right Light Rise", on April 29, 2015. The song was used as the ending theme for the anime Is It Wrong to Try to Pick Up Girls in a Dungeon?.

Wakeshima released her eighth single, "Kimi wa Soleil" November 25, 2015. The song was used as the ending theme for the anime Strike the Blood.

Wakeshima released her ninth single, "Love Your Enemies" February 10, 2016. The song was used as the ending theme for the film Selector Destructed WIXOSS.

Wakeshima's tenth single, "Unbalance by Me" was released May 7, 2016.

== Concert tours ==
- Kanon x Kanon European Tour (2011)
- The Strange Treat Tour (2013)

== Discography ==
- Shinshoku Dolce (2009)
- Lolitawork Libretto (2010)
- Tsukinami (2015)
- Luminescence Q.E.D. (2016)

== Filmography ==
Television
Year	Title	Role	Network	Notes
2008	Vampire Knight	Maid / Voice		1 Episode (S01EP08)

== Awards and nominations ==
Year	Association	Category	Nominated work	Result
2008	Shojo Beat Music Awards	Best Newcomer	Kanon Wakeshima	Nominated

== Trivia ==
- Kanon currently has four Cellos. The white cello is known as "Mikazuki-san", which means "crescent moon" and this is the cello she normally uses during live performances. The red cello is known as "Nanachie-san", which means "wisdom" used in most music videos. According to Wakeshima, Nanachie-san is very hard to play but she manages. Her third cello is a brown cello called "Yaeharu-san", which means "multi-layered spring". Yaeharu-san is very special to Wakeshima as she has had it since middle school, and it is the one she practices on and records with. Her newest is a new silver cello named "Momotose".
