= Hot Chocolat =

Single by Tommy february^{6}

from the album february & heavenly
- Released: February 9th, 2012
- Recorded: 2011
- Genre: Pop
- Length: 4:15
- Label: Warner Music Japan
- Songwriter(s): Tomoko Kawase, Shunsaku Okuda
- Producer(s): Chiffon Brownie

Tommy february^{6} singles chronology
"Strawberry Cream Soda Pop" (2009)	"Hot Chocolat" (2012)	"Halloween Party" (2012)

"Hot Chocolat" is a promotional single by Tommy february^{6} to promote her album, "february & heavenly". The song peaked at #86 on the Billboard Japan Hot 100 singles chart.

== Track list ==
All lyrics are written by Tomoko Kawase; all music is composed by Malibu Convertible

No.	Title	Length
1.	"Hot Chocolat"	4:15
Total length:		4:15
