= Halloween Party (song) =

2012 single by Halloween Junky Orchestra

Single by Halloween Junky Orchestra
- B-side: "Penalty Waltz"
- Released: October 17, 2012
- Recorded: 2012
- Genre: Rock, Halloween
- Length: 8:26
- Label: Vamprose
- Songwriter: Hyde
- Producer: Hyde

Tommy heavenly^{6} singles chronology
"Monochrome Rainbow" (2011)	"Halloween Party" (2012)	"Ice Cream Devils" (2018)

Tommy february^{6} singles chronology
"Hot Chocolat" (2012)	"Halloween Party" (2012)	"Be My Valentine" (2013)

Kanon Wakeshima singles chronology
"Koi no Doutei" (2011)	"Halloween Party" (2012)	"Foul Play ni Kurari / Sakura Meikyuu" (2012)

Music video
- "Halloween Party" on YouTube

"Halloween Party" is a song originally recorded by the Japanese supergroup Halloween Junky Orchestra in 2012. Written and produced by Hyde, it was created as part of a special Halloween project led by the rock band Vamps and features over 13 well-known musicians. It was released on October 17, 2012 by Vamps' Vamprose record label. The single reached number three on the Oricon Singles Chart and was certified Gold by the RIAJ.

== Overview ==
"Halloween Party" was written and produced by Hyde. It was released on October 17, 2012, in two CD+DVD versions and the limited edition includes a bonus booklet. The B-side is the instrumental "Penalty Waltz".

"Halloween Party" was re-released as a limited single on October 16, 2013. This edition includes a third track, "Halloween Party -feat. Hydes-", that features Hyde performing all lead vocals.

== Reception ==
"Halloween Party" reached number three on the Oricon Singles Chart and charted for 30 weeks. It also charted at #80 on Oricon's yearly singles chart for 2012. It was certified Gold by the RIAJ for sales over 100,000.

== Track listing ==
All tracks are written by Hyde.

No.	Title	Length
1.	"Halloween Party"	6:17
2.	"Penalty Waltz" (Instrumental)	2:09
3.	"Halloween Party -feat. Hydes-" (2013 re-issue only)	5:14

DVD
No.	Title	Length
1.	"Halloween Party Music Video"	6:17
2.	"Halloween Party -feat. Hydes- Music Video" (2013 re-issue only)
3.	"Halloween Party -feat. Hydes- Music Video Chi Moji-tsuki" (2013 re-issue only)
4.	"Halloween Party -feat. Hydes- Music Video Making" (2013 re-issue only)

== Personnel ==
- Hyde – vocals, songwriting, production
- Acid Black Cherry – vocals
- Daigo – vocals
- Kyo – vocals
- Tommy february^{6} – vocals
- Tommy heavenly^{6} – vocals
- Tatsuro – vocals
- Anna Tsuchiya – vocals
- Ryuuji Aoki – vocals
- K.A.Z – guitar
- Hitsugi – guitar
- Yuki – guitar
- Aki – bass
- Rina – drums
- Jin – keyboards
- Kanon Wakeshima – cello
- Daisaku Kume – orchestral arrangement

== Charts ==
Chart (2012)	Peak position
Japan Oricon Daily Singles	1
Japan Oricon Weekly Singles	3
Japan Oricon Yearly Singles	80

=== Sales and certifications ===
Chart	Amount
Oricon physical sales	100,899
RIAJ physical shipping certification	Gold

== Halloween Dolls version ==
"Halloween Party"

Song by Halloween Dolls
- Released: October 7, 2015
- Genre: Rock
- Songwriter: Hyde
- Producer: Hyde

Music video
- "Halloween Party" / Halloween Dolls -MV Short- on YouTube

"Halloween Party" was covered by Halloween Dolls, a unit composed of 15 vocalists and 5 dancers. Produced by Hyde in 2015, the CD containing this song was given as a free sample CD and DVD to kindergartens and nursery schools nationwide.

== Hyde version ==
"Halloween Party -Poupelle Ver.-"

Song by Hyde
- Released: October 16, 2020
- Genre: Rock
- Length: 5:13
- Label: Virgin Music
- Songwriter: Hyde
- Producer: Hyde

Music video
- "Halloween Party -Poupelle Ver.-" on YouTube

Hyde self-covered the song for the opening theme of the 2020 anime film Poupelle of Chimney Town. Since it is different from the original song, this rendition has the subtitle "-Poupelle Ver.-" (-プペルVer.-). Based on the script and storyboards, the image of the town that is the subject of the movie is imaged, and the brass has an industrial arrangement. In addition, some lyrics have been changed to match the content of the movie, and child singers also participated.
