= Tommy Ice Cream Heaven Forever =

Tommy Ice Cream Heaven "Forever"

Studio album by Tommy heavenly^{6}
- Released: November 27, 2013 (Japan)
- Recorded: Summer 2013 – Fall 2013; Malibu Studios, Tokyo Japan
- Genre: Pop punk; post-grunge
- Length: 38:57
- Language: Japanese, English
- Label: Warner Music Japan
- Producer: Chiffon Brownie, Tomoko Kawase

Tommy heavenly^{6} chronology
Halloween Addiction (2012)	Tommy Ice Cream Heaven "Forever" (2013)

Singles from Ice Cream Heaven
- 1. "Ruby Eyes" Released: October 2, 2013

Tommy Ice Cream Heaven "Forever" (stylized TOMMY♡ Ice Cream Heaven♡ FOREVER) is the fifth and final studio album by Tommy heavenly^{6} It was released on November 27, 2013. The album's first single, "Ruby Eyes", was released on October 2, 2013. Tommy Ice Cream Heaven "Forever" is the heavenly^{6} counterpart to february^{6}'s Tommy Candy Shop "Sugar Me".

== Release and promotion ==
In August 2013, Tommy announced she would be releasing a new single on October 2, 2013 that would be used as the theme for drama Kiyoku Ranman, and that the new single would be included in a new album to be released October 2013. The single's title was later revealed to be "Ruby Eyes". The title of the album was revealed to be Tommy Ice Cream Heaven "Forever" along with an announcement that the release date was to be on October 23, 2013. Later, the release date of the album was pushed back to November 27, 2013. "Ruby Eyes" was released as a digital single on October 2, 2013, with the music video debuting on the Warner Music Japan official YouTube account on October 25, 2013.

== Track listing ==
The official track listing was posted to the Warner Music Japan site on November 1, 2013.

CD
No.	Title	Length
1.	"-Intro- CUPCAKE CASTLE【Dark Sugar Storm】"	0:36
2.	"I WANT YOUR BLOOD†"	3:35
3.	"LET ME SCREAM"	4:16
4.	"LOVIN' YOU"	4:27
5.	"forever and anywhere"	4:12
6.	"Can you hear me ?"	4:40
7.	"-Intro- CUPCAKE CASTLE【Sugar Snow】"	0:35
8.	"Ruby Eyes"	4:15
9.	"Ash Like Snow" (English Version)	4:34
10.	"MILK TEA"	3:16
11.	"-Intro- Gelato Mountains Fight "	0:49
12.	"ICE CREAM HEAVEN, FOREVER"	3:42
Total length:		38:57

DVD
No.	Title	Length
1.	"．“Intro” CUPCAKE CASTLE（DARK SUGAR STORM）"
2.	"．RUBY EYES"
3.	"．“Intro” GELATO MOUNTAINS FIGHT"
4.	"．“Intro” CUPCAKE CASTLE（SUGAR SNOW）"
5.	"．CAN YOU HEAR ME?"

== Personnel ==
- Tomoko Kawase – Vocals
- Chiffon Brownie

== Charts ==
Chart (2012)	Peak position
Japan Oricon Weekly Albums	17
