= Halloween Addiction =

EP by Tomoko Kawase
- Released: October 17, 2012
- Recorded: 2007–2012
- Genre: Pop punk; synthpop
- Label: Warner Music Japan
- Producer: Chiffon Brownie and Tomoko Kawase

Tommy heavenly^{6} chronology
february & heavenly (2012)	Halloween Addiction (2012)	Tommy Ice Cream Heaven (2013)

"Halloween Addiction" is a Halloween EP released by Tomoko Kawase under the Tommy heavenly^{6} persona, and features one track performed by Tommy february^{6}. It contains two previously released "Halloween singles" and one new track. It was released October 17, 2012. Halloween Addiction debuted at #10 on the Oricon chart.

== Track listing ==
All songs written by Tomoko Kawase and Shunsaku Okuda, all songs performed by Tommy heavenly6 except "Why Don't You Come with Me?" performed by Tommy february6.

=== CD ===
Never Ending Party Night
No.	Title	Length
1.	"Opening"	0:09
2.	"Carnival" (－楽しいカーニバル－)	0:54
3.	"Heavenly6 Is Coming!" (－ヘヴンリーがやってくる!)	0:40
4.	"Toss the Summoner's Coin!" (－召喚のコイン!－)	0:13
5.	"Why Don't You Come with Me?" (－私と一緒に来てみたらどう?－)	2:29
6.	"Story of Shadow Light Princess Twins" (－双子のシャドウ・ライト・プリンセスのお話－)	1:28
7.	"Never Ending Party Night" (－決して終わることのないパーティ－)	5:10
Total length:		10:31

Lollipop Candy Bad Girl
No.	Title	Length
8.	"Intro"	0:42
9.	"The Pumpkin's Forest" (－カボチャの森－)	0:53
10.	"It's a Magical Party Mysterious Cake" (－マジカル・パーティー ミステリアス・ケーキ－)	1:29
11.	"Lollipop Candy Bad girl 1" (－ロリポップ・キャンディ・バッド・ガール－ 1)	1:29
12.	"Music Box Sweet Dream A"	0:29
13.	"It's a Magical Party My Dream Will Come True" (－夢見るフェブラリー－)	1:26
14.	"Lollipop Candy Bad girl 2" (－ロリポップ・キャンディ・バッド・ガール－ 2)	3:25
15.	"Music Box Sweet Dream B"	0:28
Total length:		10:31

I'm Your Devil: Halloween Remix
No.	Title	Length
16.	"Who Am I...? A" (－私は誰かって？－ A)	0:53
17.	"Royal Darkness Tea Party" (－ロイヤル・ダークネス・ティー・パーティ－)	1:19
18.	"Music Box I'm Your Devil"	0:38
19.	"I'm Your Devil" (－私はあなたの悪魔よ－)	6:03
20.	"Be Ready for the Nightmare" (－悪夢への準備－)	0:43
21.	"Who Am I...? B" (－私は誰かって？－ B)	0:57
Total length:		10:31

=== DVD ===
No.	Title	Length
1.	"Never Ending Party Night: Why Don't You Come with Me?" (－私と一緒に来てみたらどう？－)
2.	"Never Ending Party Night: Never Ending Party Night" (－決して終わることのないパーティ－)
3.	"Lollipop Candy Bad girl"
4.	"I'm Your Devil: Halloween Remix"
