= February & Heavenly =

Studio album by Tomoko Kawase
- Released: February 29, 2012
- Recorded: 2010–12
- Genre: Synthpop; pop punk; post-grunge
- Length: 1:08:35
- Label: Warner Music Japan
- Producer: Shunsaku Okuda

Tommy February^{6} chronology
Strawberry Cream Soda Pop Daydream (2009)	February & Heavenly (2012)	Tommy Candy Shop (2013)

Tommy Heavenly^{6} chronology
I Kill My Heart (2009)	February & Heavenly (2012)	Halloween Addiction (2012)

Singles from February & Heavenly
- 1. "I'm Your Devil" Released: October 7, 2010; 2. "Monochrome Rainbow" Released: October 26, 2011; 3. "Hot Chocolat" Released: February 9, 2012

February & Heavenly is Tomoko Kawase's sixth solo studio album, her first under the Warner Music Japan record label. Released February 29, 2012, the album is a double album featuring Kawase as both the february^{6} and heavenly^{6} personas. The album is Tommy february^{6}'s third studio album, and heavenly^{6}'s fourth. february & heavenly debuted at #7 on the Oricon albums chart.

== Release and promotion ==
In May 2010, the song "I'm Your Devil" was used in a CM for MODE, in which there are two versions of the CM was released. The song was released as a digital download on October 7, 2010. Tommy then announced plans to release a full physical single of "I'm Your Devil", along with a new Tommy february^{6} album, to be titled "I'LL BE BACK". Shortly after, the 2011 Tōhoku earthquake and tsunami took place and Tommy announced she was postponing the album until further notice to take time to grieve.

After months of inactivity, Tommy heavenly^{6} performed her song "Pray" at the 2011 Cherry Blossom Festival in Japan, and released exclusive "Pray" themed merchandise through Lightvan Company, including a kimono style robe and plush toy. In August 2011, Tommy stated via Twitter she is resuming work on demos for both Tommy heavenly^{6} and Tommy february^{6}.

Finally, in September 2011 Tommy announced her next single for Tommy heavenly^{6} as "Monochrome Rainbow", with an October 26, 2011, release date. "Monochrome Rainbow" was also used as the second season ending song for the anime, Bakuman. Previews for the "Monochrome Rainbow" and "I'm Your Devil" music videos premiered October 28, 2011. The six-minute version of "I'm Your Devil" debuted on November 8, 2011. On November 11, 2011, Tommy announced during an interview with J-Wave Circus Circus she is in the process of recording a double album featuring both Tommy heavenly^{6} and Tommy february^{6}, set for release in 2012. Warner released a press release on December 1, 2011, stating the album's release date as February 29, 2012. The album's title was later revealed to be "february & heavenly". Kawase appeared on the cover of Volume 89 of Marquee magazine, promoting the album. The video for HOT CHOCOLAT, and full-length videos for "Monochrome Rainbow" and "I'm Your Devil" premiered on Space Shower TV February 9th, 2012. The same day, a promotional download of Hot Chocolat was made available which also featured a preview for the album.

The album was released February 29, 2012, and debuted at #7 on the Oricon albums chart.

== Track listing ==
The official track listing was posted to the Warner Music Japan site on January 30, 2012.

All lyrics are written by Tomoko Kawase, all music composed and arranged by Malibu Convertible

Disc 1: february
No.	Title	Length
1.	"Hot Chocolat"	4:14
2.	"Gimme Gimme Gimme"	4:39
3.	"I'm Your Angel"	4:30
4.	"My Future Boy"	4:06
5.	"Last Slow Dance"	3:55
6.	"Good Night My Sweet Day"	4:37
7.	"I Hold Your Night"	4:11
Total length:		30:12

All lyrics are written by Tomoko Kawase except otherwise noted, all music composed and arranged by Mark and John

Disc 2: heavenly
No.	Title	Lyrics	Length
1.	"Call Me Princess"		5:12
2.	"Hate Your Lies"		5:28
3.	"I'm Your Devil" (Album Version)	Tomoko Kawase & James "JJ" De Barrado (Rap)	4:59
4.	"You Hurt Me"		3:58
5.	"Monochrome Rainbow"		4:13
6.	"Dark Dark Sky"		4:02
7.	"I'm Your Devil" (Halloween Remix)	Tomoko Kawase & James "JJ" De Barrado (Rap)	10:31
Total length:			38:23

DVD: Music Video
No.	Title	Length
1.	"Hot Chocolat"	4:14
2.	"Monochrome Rainbow"	4:13
3.	"I'm Your Devil" (Halloween Remix)	10:31
