= Monochrome Rainbow (song) =

Single by Tommy heavenly^{6}

from the album february & heavenly
- Released: October 26, 2011
- Genre: Rock
- Label: Warner Music Japan
- Songwriters: Tomoko Kawase, James De Barrado
- Producers: Mark and John

Tommy heavenly^{6} singles chronology
"I'm Your Devil" (2010)	"Monochrome Rainbow" (2011)	"Halloween Party" (2012)

"Monochrome Rainbow" is a song by Japanese singer Tommy heavenly^{6}, and first single for her fourth album. Monochrome Rainbow was released on October 26, 2011, and debuted at number 14 on the Oricon singles chart. "Monochrome Rainbow" was Tommy heavenly^{6}'s first official single since 2008 and first official single with Warner Music Japan. "Monochrome Rainbow" was also used as the second season ending song for the anime, Bakuman.

== Track listing ==
The official track listing of the double A-side single was posted to Tommy heavenly^{6}'s official site on September 9, 2011.

All lyrics are written by Tomoko Kawase except where otherwise noted, all music composed and arranged by Mark and John.

Regular Edition
No.	Title	Writer(s)	Length
1.	"Monochrome Rainbow"	Tomoko Kawase	4:12
2.	"I'm Your Devil (Halloween Remix)"		10:36

iTunes Bonus Track
No.	Title	Lyrics	Length
3.	"I'm Your Devil"	Tomoko Kawase & James "JJ" De Barrado (Rap)	4:56

Limited Edition Bonus Tracks
No.	Title	Lyrics	Length
3.	"Monochrome Rainbow" (Instrumental Version)		4:12
4.	"I'm Your Devil (Halloween Remix)" (Instrumental Version)	Tomoko Kawase & James "JJ" De Barrado (Rap)	10:31

Notes

- I'm Your Devil (iTunes Bonus Track) is a different version than released on the I'm Your Devil promotional single.
- I'm Your Devil (Halloween Remix) contains additional vocals by James De Barrado.

== Music videos ==
Previews for the Monochrome Rainbow and I'm Your Devil music videos premiered on Kawase's official YouTube on October 28, 2011. The six-minute version of "I'm Your Devil" debuted on November 8, 2011. The unreleased full length videos for Monochrome Rainbow and I'm Your Devil will be included on a DVD with the limited edition release of the album.
