= Tommy Candy Shop Sugar Me =

Tommy Candy Shop "Sugar Me"

Studio album by Tommy february^{6}
- Released: June 12, 2013 (Japan)
- Recorded: Winter 2012 – Spring 2013
- Studios: Malibu Studios, Tokyo Japan
- Genres: Synthpop; techno
- Languages: Japanese, English, French
- Label: Warner Music Japan
- Producers: Malibu Convertible, Tomoko Kawase

Tommy february^{6} chronology
February & Heavenly (2012)	Tommy Candy Shop "Sugar Me" (2013)

Singles from Tommy Candy Shop
- 1. "Be My Valentine" Released: February 6, 2013; 2. "Runaway / Sugar Me" Released: June 5, 2013

Tommy Candy Shop "Sugar Me" (stylized TOMMY♡ Candy Shop♡ SUGAR ME) is the fourth studio album by Tommy february^{6}, released on June 12, 2013, through Warner Music Japan. The album debuted at #4 on the Oricon Japan chart. It is Tommy february^{6}'s first album to be written predominantly in English. It is also february^{6}'s first album that wasn't written entirely by Tomoko Kawase. Tommy Candy Shop "Sugar Me" is the february^{6} counterpart to heavenly^{6}'s Tommy Ice Cream Heaven "Forever".

== Release and promotion ==
The album's first single, "Be My Valentine" was announced in December 2012 as a special Valentine's Day single. The single was released as planned on February 6, 2013, debuting at number twenty-six on the Oricon weekly singles chart, and peaking at number twenty-five on the Billboard Japan Hot 100. A cover of The Brilliant Green's "Ai no Ai no Hoshi" was included as a B-side in honor of the band's 15th anniversary.

"Runaway", the second single from the album, was announced in April 2013, along with the formal announcement of the album. Runaway is sung completely in English. Starting on April 8, 2013, "Runaway" was used as the ending theme song for TV Tokyo's Jitsuryoku Sekai no Mystery. "Runaway", along with "Sugar Me" were released as a double a-side promotional single on June 5, 2013.

Tomoko Kawase appeared on the cover of Volume # of Marquee magazine, promoting the album.

Tommy Candy Shop "Sugar Me" was released in regular and limited editions. The limited edition included a DVD with the music videos for "Runaway" and "Sugar Me", as well as special packaging and a sticker sheet. Albums per-ordered from certain retailers came with a limited edition poster.

== Track listing ==
The official track listing and cover art were posted to the Warner Music Japan site on May 20, 2013.

All music composed and arranged by Malibu Convertible.

CD
No.	Title	Lyrics	Length
1.	"Fairy Dust"	James De Barrado, Tomoko Kawase	4:23
2.	"Sugar ♥ Me"	Kawase	3:37
3.	"Runaway"	De Barrado, Kawase	3:37
4.	"Angel Fade"	De Barrado, Kawase	3:34
5.	"Spacey Cowgirl"	Jimi Aoma, Kawase	4:38
6.	"Pink Army"	De Barrado, Kawase	3:43
7.	"Ai no ♥ Ai no Hoshi" (the brilliant green Cover)	Kawase	3:28
8.	"My Vacation"	Kawase	5:01
9.	"Summer Bubbles"	Aoma, Kawase	5:13
10.	"Be My Valentine"	Kawase	6:00
Total length:			58:25

DVD
No.	Title	Length
1.	"Sugar ♥ Me" (Music Video)	3:37
2.	"Runaway" (Music Video)	3:37
3.	"Sugar ♥ Me" (Dance Video)	3:37
4.	"Runaway" (Dance Video)	3:37
Total length:		14:28

== Personnel ==
- Tomoko Kawase – vocals, production
- Malibu Convertible – production
- James De Barrado – vocals

== Chart positions ==
Chart (2012)	Peak position
Japan Oricon Daily Albums	4
Japan Oricon Weekly Albums	9
Japan Oricon Monthly Albums	43

== Certifications ==
Chart	Amount
Oricon physical sales	9,128
RIAJ physical shipping certification	-
