= Tsukinami (album) =

TSUKINAMI

Studio album by Kanon Wakeshima
- Released: February 25, 2015
- Genre: Baroque pop

Kanon Wakeshima chronology
Lolitawork Libretto (2010)	TSUKINAMI (2015)

Singles from TSUKINAMI
- 1. "Foul Play ni Kurari / Sakura Meikyuu" Released: November 7, 2012; 2. "Signal" Released: February 19, 2014; 3. "Killy Killy Joker" Released: April 30, 2014; 4. "World's End, Girl's Rondo" Released: October 15, 2014

"TSUKINAMI" (ツキナミ) is the third studio album by singer and cellist Kanon Wakeshima, released February 25, 2015. The album peaked at #30 on the Oricon Albums Chart and stayed on the chart for four weeks.

== Track listing ==
CD
No.	Title	Length
1.	"Killy Killy Joker"	4:38
2.	"TSUKINAMI (ツキナミ, lit. 'Trite')"	4:53
3.	"Sansukumi (さんすくみ, lit. 'Three-way deadlock')"	3:58
4.	"Chocolate (チョコレート, Chokorēto)"	4:45
5.	"Signal"	5:33
6.	"Foul Play ni Kurari (ファールプレーにくらり)"	4:27
7.	"Sakura Meikyuu (サクラメイキュウ)"	4:35
8.	"Geijutsuka no Kawaii Sōzō-tachi (芸術家のかわいい想像たち, lit. 'cute imaginations of an artist')"	3:22
9.	"Nightingale (ナイチンゲール, Naichingēru)"	3:34
10.	"World's End, Girl's Rondo"	4:28
11.	"Monster Star (モンスター・スター, Monsutā Sutā)"	5:16
Total length:		49:29

DVD
No.	Title	Length
1.	"TSUKINAMI (ツキナミ, lit. 'Trite')"
2.	"World's End, Girl's Rondo"
3.	"Killy Killy Joker"
4.	"Signal"

== Personnel ==
- Kanon Wakeshima – vocals, cello, lyrics
