= WIXOSS =

Japanese collectible card game, launched by Tomy in 2014

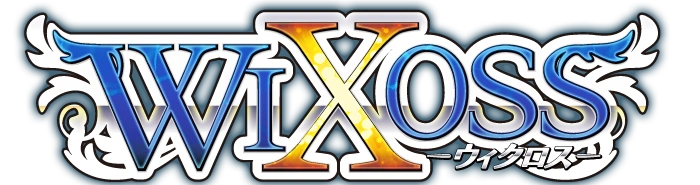
The logo used in the wixoss trading card game

WIXOSS (Note: Short for "Wish Across". Phonetically read in Japanese as Wikurosu (Japanese: ウィクロス).) (pronounced whii-kros) is a Japanese gacha strategy Trading Card Game created by Hobby Japan along with lead game designer Shouta Yasooka, and first published by Takara Tomy in April 2014 in Japan and in November 2021 for English audiences.

The game has spawned a multimedia franchise produced as a collaboration between Takara Tomy, J.C.Staff, and Warner Bros. Entertainment Japan. The stories in multimedia revolves around the eponymous trading card game and follows girls known as Selectors who battle against each other in order to have their wishes granted.

An anime television series by J.C.Staff, titled selector infected WIXOSS, aired in Japan between April and June 2014, with a second season, selector spread WIXOSS, airing between October and December 2014. A compilation film, titled selector destructed WIXOSS, was released on February 13, 2016. A sequel anime television series, titled Lostorage incited WIXOSS, aired from October to December 2016, with its second season, Lostorage conflated WIXOSS, airing from April to June 2018. Another anime television series, titled WIXOSS Diva(A)Live, aired from January to March 2021. Several manga spin-offs, a novelization, and a smartphone app have also been produced.

== Trading card game ==
=== General rules ===
WIXOSS is a strategy trading card game in which players take control and battle against each other with fighters known as LRIGs (ルリグ, Rurigu; "girl" spelled backwards) separated into three linear lanes, using main deck SIGNI to support them.

Deck composition is made up two decks, Main and LRIG decks:

- LRIG decks can only hold up to 12 cards, 10 LRIGs and 2 PIECE cards:
  - LRIGs act as the main heroines of player's field and cannot be removed from play. Two types of LRIGs exist in the game:
    - Main LRIGs, which stand in the center of the LRIG team, influencing SIGNI levels and can go on the offensive after SIGNI attacks.
    - Assist LRIGs, which support the main one and the rest of the field through their effects while slightly increasing the SIGNI LIMIT of the Main LRIG. Assist LRIGs can grow up to level 2 during the Main Phase, with no limit to how many times an Assist LRIG can grow, as long as the color cost is paid, conditions are satisfied and the Assist's level does not exceed the Main LRIG's level.
  - PIECEs are cards that act as spells that can be activated from the LRIG deck any time during the main phase once their conditions are met. These cards are discarded from the game entirely once used.
- Main decks can have only 40 cards, being SIGNI (main deck pawns) and Spells of a player's choice, but can hold no more than four of the same-named cards and no more than 20 Life Burst (✱) marked cards, regardless of name.
  - Note: Certain cards or deck archetypes may require an additional deck, separate from the Main and LRIG deck, such as SIGNI and LRIGs that make use of a separate CRAFT deck that further elaborate on their effects when activated or summon their own CRAFT SIGNI, or certain crossovers such as Blue Archive Diva requiring their Memorial Lobby tokens to keep track of bonded students and their alt costume bonds.

Before play, players may look at the top five cards in their Main Deck and determine which cards are worth keeping and which are worth shuffling and replacing (i.e. shuffle two hand cards, then replace with two new cards from the top of the deck). The cards from the replacement draw are what are kept regardless of satisfaction.

Afterward, both players take seven cards from the top of their main deck, without knowing what they are, and lay them down as their Life Cloth, acting as a shield for the player oneself.

Players lay down three LV-0 LRIGs of choice, face down on the back row of a 2x3 grid. Once the preparations are complete on both sides, both players play a chance based microgame (Coin flip, rock paper scissors, "even or odd" dice roll, etc.) to determine the first player, then both proclaim "OPEN!" to formally start the game, reveal their LRIGs, with the first player starting by drawing one card, of which all turns after default to two cards.

==== General play ====
After the draw phase, a player may discard one SIGNI or spell of choice from their the hand or field to the Ener Zone. The first turn player cannot attack until their second turn.

The core mechanic of the game is the ability to grow your Main LRIGs from levels zero to three. The higher the level of the Main LRIG, the higher the level of the SIGNI that enter the field are allowed. Also, the higher the combined LRIG team's SIGNI LIMIT becomes, allowing more SIGNI to be on the field at a higher combined level (i.e. SIGNI LIMITs 1+6+1 from your LRIGs will allow SIGNI levels that count to 8 in total or less, becoming a resource that pays and restricts SIGNI levels allowed on the field like allowing no more SIGNI levels that above the number 8 on the field, i.e. SIGNI at levels 2,3,3 would be the SIGNI team composition because they do not count above the limit of 8, nor does a SIGNI team composition of Levels 2,2,1). This allows more stronger SIGNI that use their abilities and effects to poke holes onto your opponent's SIGNI zones and defenses to attack their "Life Cloth", represented by the seven randomized face down cards pulled from the top of the deck at the start of the game.

If luck strikes, a Life Cloth card lost activates a Life Burst ✱ effect from the SIGNI revealed, which will allow the revealing player to cast a spell-like effect on the field before leaving to the "Ener Zone", unless willingly ignored and discarded the card.

SIGNI of a higher damage value on the field can vanish a weaker SIGNI to the Ener Zone by shifting the card horizontally to attack. The inverse dynamic does no damage or changes to either player. Cards that are horizontal are considered "Downed", as in they can no longer fight until it is UP'ed at phase the beginning of the acting player's next turn, assuming the Frozen status by an opponent's effect isn't applied to a targeted card for that opening of the turn. Main LRIGs are always capable to attacking directly, ignoring SIGNI (and of course, LRIGs) that stand in the way, and can only be negated by Servant #, the only card in the game with a guard ability.

Ener Zones act as the game's faux-graveyard by also being its main source of restoring Ener, short for energy, allowing for more complex SIGNI effects or higher LRIG growths to be performed by consuming a certain amount of the same or approved Ener color requirements to activate it, with the used card moved to the "trash" deck. Ener can be manually restored by playing cards that list Ener Charge in their effects if their conditions, if any, are satisfied.

If a player runs out of Main Deck cards, they must pay 1 life cloth in order to refresh their trash into a newly shuffled deck and continue playing. The used card is not checked for life bursts or stored for Ener, instead it is immediately discarded to trash. If a player has any more than 6 cards by the end of their commanding turn, they must trash cards until they only have 6.

The first player to take an eighth naked final blow oneself, either from a direct SIGNI or LRIG attack, after their Life Cloth exhausts will be declared the loser.

==== Other playstyles ====
Other older formats exist where LRIG levels can go higher or require unique mechanics to that format, but are currently not in competitive play, with Diva Selection being the only format released and regularly updated for English audiences.

Such formats include:

- WiXoss Classic Selection: a format in which Players only control one LRIG, with LRIG levels going up to 5+ and no Assist LRIGs. They also use unique ability cards called "ARTS", which are spells defined by the LRIG chosen, and a wider selection of Servant cards other than Servant #.
- Key Selection
- Diva Debut Selection: A psudo-format from the launch of Diva Selection with all of the same rules, except that main deck SIGNI and spells must match their three LRIG team's colors. After Spring 2024, this restriction was lifted for the modern game as all colors can now be used for competitive Diva Selection format, regardless of LRIG team composition. Due to the nature of being part of Diva Selection's history, it is still a viable ruleset to be played in English.
- All-Star Selection: an "anything goes" format where any cards built for any format can be played against each other (i.e. Wixoss Classic Selection vs a Diva Selection deck). Because of the mashed together nature of the format, a unique ban list dubbed "Mayu's Room" is implemented for the sake of competitive play and fairness, although these rules can be ignored for "house rule"-based ban lists in non-competitive environments.

=== Release ===
The game initially debuted its Japanese release on April 26, 2014. On July 13, 2021, Takara Tomy announced that an English version of the game would begin release from November 2021 based on the newly introduced "WiXoss Diva" format, beginning with the Interlude Diva set based on the WIXOSS Diva(A)Live anime series. Interlude Diva set was released November 6, 2021. Diva Debut Decks and the Glowing Diva set were released December 17, 2021. The Changing Diva set WxDi-P02 was released March 18, 2022. Since then, the game has since collabed with other franchises such as VTuber agency Nijisanji (CP-01), multimedia music project Den-On-Bu (WXDi-P14) and RTS gacha game Blue Archive (CP-02).

- Selector infected WiXoss
- Promotional image for the selector infected WIXOSS anime series, featuring Ruko (front), Tama (on card), Chiyori, Hitoe, Yuzuki, Akira, and Iona (back, left to right).
- Genre: Dark fantasy; Psychological thriller; Science fiction
- Created by: LRIG; Takara Tomy; Warner Bros. Japan; J.C.Staff
- Anime television series

selector infected WIXOSS
- Directed by: Takuya Satō
- Written by: Mari Okada
- Music by: Maiko Iuchi
- Studio: J.C.Staff
- Licensed by: NA: Funimation; UK: Anime Limited
- Original network: MBS, Tokyo MX, TVA, AT-X, BS11
- Original run: April 3, 2014 – June 19, 2014
- Episodes: 12
Further information
Manga
selector infected WIXOSS -peeping analyze-
Written by	Mari Okada
Illustrated by	Manatsu Suzuki
Published by	Shueisha
Magazine	Ultra Jump
Original run	July 19, 2014 – May 19, 2015
Volumes	2
Manga
selector infected WIXOSS -Re/Verse-
Written by	Mari Okada
Illustrated by	Meki Meki
Published by	Square Enix
Magazine	Monthly Big Gangan
Original run	August 25, 2014 – October 24, 2015
Volumes	2
Anime television series
selector spread WIXOSS
Directed by	Takuya Satō
Written by	Mari Okada
Music by	Maiko Iuchi
Studio	J.C.Staff
Licensed by	NA: Funimation
Original network	MBS, Tokyo MX, TVA, AT-X, BS11
Original run	October 4, 2014 – December 20, 2014
Episodes	12
Anime film
selector destructed WIXOSS
Directed by	Takuya Satō
Written by	Mari Okada
Music by	Maiko Iuchi
Studio	J.C.Staff
Released	February 13, 2016
Runtime	91 minutes
Anime television series
Lostorage incited WIXOSS
Directed by	Katsushi Sakurabi
Produced by	Tomo Yamaguchi; Jun Fukuda; Yuichiro Siji
Written by	Michihiro Tsuchiya
Music by	Maiko Iuchi
Studio	J.C.Staff
Licensed by	NA: Crunchyroll
Original network	BS11, Tokyo MX, KBS, SUN, TV Asahi Channel 1
Original run	October 7, 2016 – December 23, 2016
Episodes	12
Original video animation
Lostorage conflated WIXOSS -missing link-
Directed by	Risako Yoshida
Written by	Michihiro Tsuchiya
Studio	J.C.Staff
Released	December 14, 2017
Anime television series
Lostorage conflated WIXOSS
Directed by	Risako Yoshida
Written by	Michihiro Tsuchiya
Music by	Maiko Iuchi
Studio	J.C.Staff
Licensed by	NA: Crunchyroll
Original network	Tokyo MX, BS11
Original run	April 6, 2018 – June 22, 2018
Episodes	12
Anime television series
WIXOSS Diva(A)Live
Directed by	Masato Matsune
Written by	Tsuyoshi Tamai
Music by	Maiko Iuchi
Studio	J.C.Staff
Licensed by	NA: Crunchyroll
Original network	Tokyo MX, BS11
Original run	January 9, 2021 – March 27, 2021
Episodes	12

== Multimedia premise ==
The main selector anime series follows a girl named Ruko Kominato, who becomes a Selector after receiving an LRIG that she names Tama. As she and various other Selectors battle it out for the sake of their wish, Ruko finds herself drawn into the dark, sinister world of WIXOSS, discovering that, win or lose, there is always a price to pay. Certain LRIGs are able to communicate with their owners, and the girls chosen to wield them are known as "Selectors" (セレクター, Serekutā). Selectors are given the chance to have any wish granted by winning battles against other Selectors, but should they lose three times, their wish will be reversed into a curse instead.

In the Lostorage, set following the events of selector, Suzuko Homura, a girl who had just returned to her hometown, finds herself drawn into new kind of Selector battle alongside her LRIG Riru. In these battles, which now include male Selectors, players must wager coins representing their memories, and should they lose them all, they will lose all of their memories and effectively disappear.

In WIXOSS Diva(A)Live, which is set in a different universe from the previous two series, WIXOSS battles take place in a virtual world, in which players become Divas and battle in teams of three against other Divas. Hirana Asu forms the team No Limit alongside Rei Sakigake and Akino Onko and aspires to rise to the ranks of Top Diva.

== Media ==
=== Anime ===
selector infected WIXOSS, produced by J.C.Staff, is directed by Takuya Satō and written by Mari Okada, with character designs by Kyuta Sakai and music by Maiko Iuchi of I've Sound. The first season aired on MBS between April 3 and June 19, 2014, and was simulcast by Funimation in North America and Crunchyroll in other territories outside Japan. The opening theme is "killy killy JOKER" by Kanon Wakeshima and the ending theme is "realize -Yume no Matsu Basho-" (realize -夢の待つ場所-, realize -Where Our Dreams Are Waiting-) by Cyua. A second season, title selector spread WIXOSS aired between October 4 and December 20, 2014. The opening theme is "world's end, girl's rondo" by Wakeshima, whilst the ending theme is "Undo -Ashita e no Kioku-" (Undo -明日への記憶-, Undo -A Memory For Tomorrow) by Cyua. An animated film, selector destructed WIXOSS, was released in Japanese theaters by Warner Bros. Pictures on February 13, 2016.

A new anime project featuring new characters, titled Lostorage incited WIXOSS, aired from October 7 to December 23, 2016, and was simulcast by Crunchyroll. Katsushi Sakurabi is directing the new anime, with Michihiro Tsuchiya writing the scripts, Takamitsu Satou designing the characters, Maiko Iuchi composing the music, and J.C.Staff returning to produce the animation. The opening theme is "Lostorage" by Yuka Iguchi while the ending theme is "undeletable" by Cyua. Another season, Lostorage conflated WIXOSS aired from April 6 to June 22, 2018. The first episode was released as an original video animation bundled with the SP-32 Selector Collection trading card set on December 14, 2017. The opening theme is "Unlock" by Iguchi while the ending theme is "I" by Cyua.

A new television series was announced on March 26, 2020, which was originally set to premiere in 2020. Titled WIXOSS Diva(A)Live, it aired from January 9 to March 27, 2021. Masato Matsune is directing the new anime, with Gō Tamai writing the scripts, Ui Shigure designing the characters, Maiko Iuchi composing the music, and J.C.Staff returning to produce the animation. Crunchyroll licensed the series.

An animated PV celebrating the original anime's 10th anniversary, titled selector loth WIXOSS, was released on YouTube on April 26, 2024.

=== Manga ===
Four manga spin-off series, written by Okada, are being produced. selector infected WIXOSS -peeping analyze-, illustrated by Manatsu Suzuki, was serialized in Shueisha's Ultra Jump magazine between July 19, 2014, and May 19, 2015. selector infected WIXOSS: Maya no Oheya (selector infected WIXOSS 〜まゆのおへや〜, selector infected WIXOSS: Maya's Room), illustrated by Nini, began serialization in Ultra Jump from August 2014. selector infected WIXOSS -Re/Verse-, illustrated by Meki Meki, was serialized in Square Enix's Monthly Big Gangan magazine between August 25, 2014, and October 24, 2015. selector stirred WIXOSS, illustrated by Monaco Sena, began publication in Hobby Japan's WIXOSS Magazine from April 25, 2015.

=== Other media ===
A novel written by Madoka Madoka and illustrated by Meiji, titled WIXOSS: Twin Wing, was released in Japan on September 30, 2015. A smartphone game, selector battle with WIXOSS, was released in Japan for Android and iOS on March 31, 2015, and June 8, 2015, respectively. A HTML5 game, titled WIXOSS Multiverse, was launched on the G123 game platform operated by CTW Inc. in 2022.
