= Strawberry Cream Soda Pop Daydream =

Compilation album by Tommy february^{6}
- Released: February 25, 2009
- Genre: Electronica
- Length: 78:00
- Label: Defstar Records
- Producer: Malibu Convertible; Tomoko Kawase

Tommy february^{6} chronology
Tommy Airline (2004)	Strawberry Cream Soda Pop Daydream (2009)	february & heavenly (2012)

Strawberry Cream Soda Pop Daydream is the first compilation album from Tommy february^{6}, released on February 25, 2009, by DefSTAR Records coinciding with Tommy heavenly^{6}'s release of Gothic Melting Ice Cream's Darkness Nightmare. The album was a released as a double-disc CD and DVD. The CD features all singles released by Tommy february^{6}, one new song, and a few additional tracks. The DVD features music videos for each single, as well as making of videos.

== Track listing ==
All lyrics are written by Tomoko Kawase; all music is composed by Malibu Convertible and Tomoko Kawase.

CD
No.	Title	Original album	Length
1.	"T.O.M.M.Y."	Tommy february6	0:47
2.	"Everyday at the Bus Stop"	Tommy february6	3:47
3.	"Kiss One More Time"	Tommy february6	4:08
4.	"Bloomin'!"	Tommy february6	3:36
5.	"Je t'aime★je t'aime"	Tommy Airline	4:55
6.	"Love Is Forever"	Tommy Airline	4:48
7.	"MaGic in youR Eyes"	Tommy Airline	5:35
8.	"Lovely 〜夢見るLovely Boy〜 (Lovely 〜Yume Miru Lovely Boy〜)"	Released as a single only	3:47
9.	"Lonely in Gorgeous"	Released as a single only	4:02
10.	"I Still Love You Boy"	Tommy Airline	5:19
11.	"Can't Take My Eyes off of You"	Tommy february6	3:47
12.	"ふたりのシーサイ (Futari no Seaside)"	Tommy Airline	5:01
13.	"トミーフェブラッテ、マカロン。(Tommy Feburatte, Makaron)"	Tommy february6	4:49
14.	"Is This Feeling Love?"	B-side of Lonely in Gorgeous	4:41
15.	"I'll Be Your Angel"	Tommy february6	4:44
16.	"Candy Pop in Love★"	Tommy february6	4:19
17.	"Sweet Dream"	Tommy Airline	4:12
18.	"Strawberry Cream◯Soda Pop◯"	Promotional single	4:49
Total length:			78:00

DVD
No.	Title	Description	Length
1.	"Everyday at the Bus Stop"	Music Video	3:55
2.	"Making Digest 01"	Making of "Everyday at the Bus Stop"	3:41
3.	"Kiss One More Time"	Music Video	4:11
4.	"Bloomin'!"	Music Video	3:38
5.	"Making Digest 02"	Making of "Kiss One More Time" and "Bloomin'!"	3:30
6.	"Je t'aime je t'aime"	Music Video	5:02
7.	"Love Us Forever"	Music Video	5:23
8.	"Magic in Your Eyes"	Music Video	5:45
9.	"Making Digest 03"	Making of "Magic in Your Eyes"	3:32
10.	"Lovely: Dreaming Lovely Boy"	Music Video	4:15
11.	"Lonely in Gorgeous"	Music Video	4:13
12.	"Strawberry Cream Soda Pop"	Music Video	5:53
13.	"Strawberry Cream Soda Pop (Pon Pon Version)"	Music Video	4:38
14.	"Lonely in Gorgeous (Choreography Version A)"	Music Video	4:07
15.	"Lonely in Gorgeous (Choreography Version B)"	Music Video	4:07
Total length:			62:00
