= An Cafe =

Japanese pop rock band

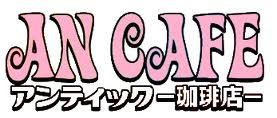
- Logo written in the Action Is typeface.

Background information
- Also known as: Antic Café
- Origin: Tokyo, Japan
- Genres: Pop rock; dance rock; power pop
- Years active: 2003–2010, 2012–2018, 2024 - Present
- Labels: Loop Ash; MusicRay'n, Red Cafe (2003-2010); Sony Music Records / VVV Records (2012- ); Gan-Shin (EU); Sony BMG (KR); Maru Music (US)
- Members: Miku; Kanon; Teruki; Takuya; Yu-ki
- Past members: Bou
- Website: ancafe-official.com

Antic Café (アンティック-珈琲店-, Antikku Kafe; nicknamed An Cafe) is a Japanese pop rock band formed in 2003 and signed to Sony Music Japan. Their visual image is oshare kei, and they describe their music as "Harajuku Dance Rock". The group has released six full-length albums, two compilation albums, and four EPs. On September 1, 2009, the band announced that after their live show on January 4, 2010 at the Nippon Budokan, they would suspend activities and put the group on hiatus, however they stated they will not disband. In 2012, after a two-year break, the team announced the resumption of activities. In June 2018, the band announced the departure of all members but Miku and a hiatus beginning in January 2019. On September 16th, 2024, they announced their return, with a re-recorded version of a song, plus the announcement of a 2025 tour, with all members returning except for Bou.

== History ==
An Cafe was formed in May 2003 by vocalist Miku, guitarist Bou and bassist Kanon. Miku's former band, Revirii, had disbanded two months earlier in April, and even though the band did not have a drummer at this point, they started to perform at several events. They were joined by drummer Teruki in 2004 after he left his former band, Feathers-Blue.

In 2004, An Cafe released their first demos and signed a record deal with Loop Ash. Their first release, "Candyholic", was released in March and reached the second spot on the Oricon indies single chart. The band continued touring and releasing, including their first album, Shikisai Moment, in 2005. The band released even more singles in 2006 until their second studio album, Magnya Carta (a play on "Magna Carta").

In 2007, the band announced their first overseas appearance at Project A-Kon. The announcement of this was followed shortly by the departure of guitarist Bou. The last performance with Bou was on April 30, 2007, and was featured in a DVD titled Hibiya On ☆The☆ 0 New Sekai. After Bou left the band, two new members were announced: Takuya was to replace Bou as the guitarist and Yu-ki was to join An Cafe as a keyboardist. The first single with their new lineup was announced as "Kakusei Heroism" followed by "Ryūsei Rocket". At the end of 2007, An Cafe announced their first overseas tour, taking place in Europe in 2008.

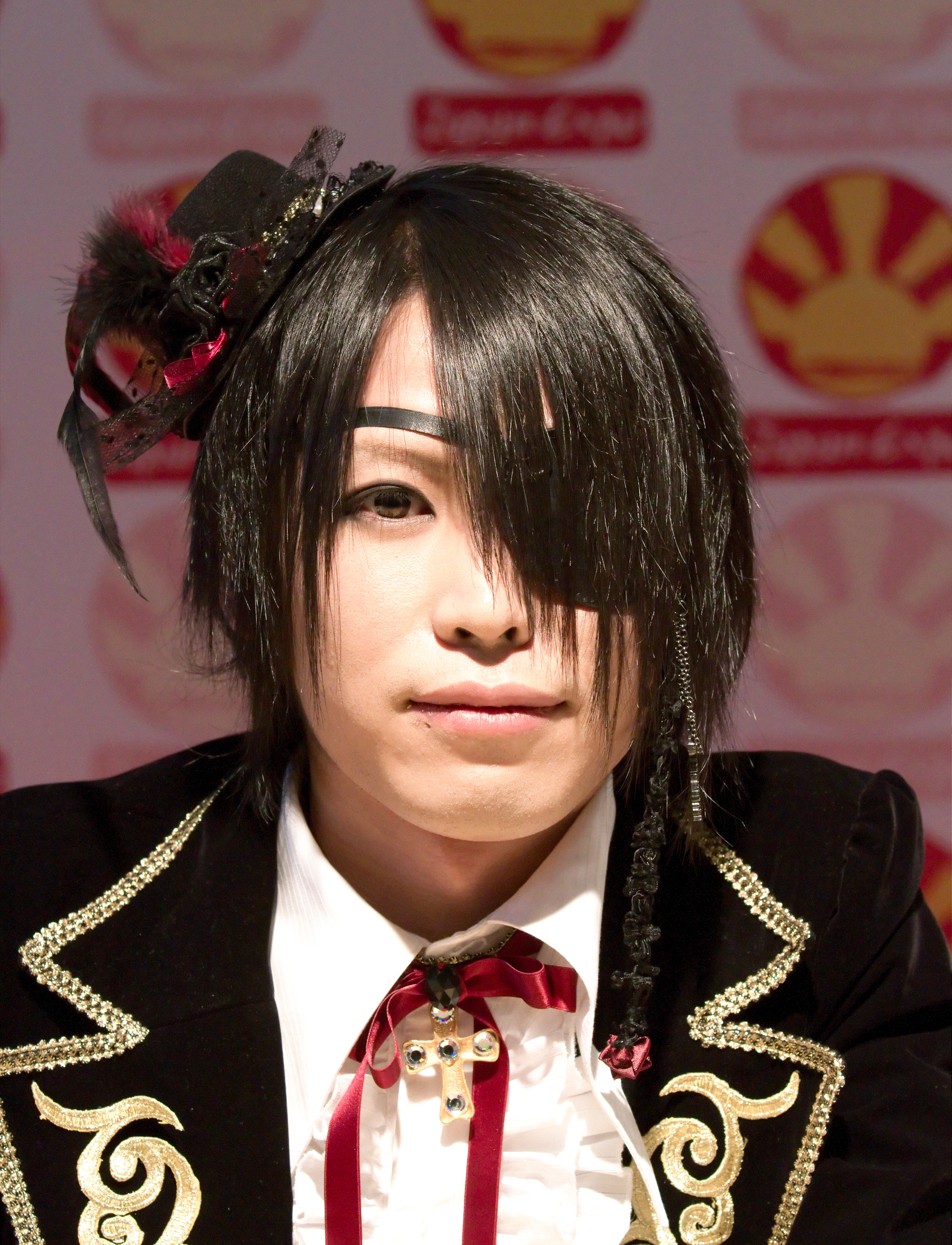
Kanon at Japan Expo 2010

In the opening weeks of 2008, An Cafe announced their upcoming single, "Cherry Saku Yuki!!", in February, as well as their next studio album, Gokutama Rock Cafe, which was released on April 9, 2008.

An Cafe's EP, Harajuku Dance Rock, was released by the Los Angeles based Maru Music on March 13, 2009. This special release was made exclusively for overseas fans in North America and Europe.

BB Parallel World, An Cafe's fourth studio album, was released in Japan on September 9, 2009; and in Europe on October 6, 2009. It contains title track singles "Aroma", "Summer Dive" and "Natsu Koi ★ Natsu Game", and eight other songs.

In 2010, An Cafe announced that they would be taking an indefinite hiatus. The message, issued on their official homepage, claimed that "after the Budokan show, each member will concentrate on their own activity to be prepared for the band to restart in the future". The aforementioned Nippon Budokan show took place on January 4, 2010.

During the hiatus, several members were involved in other projects. Kanon started his own label, StudioBlue3, and created a cell phone game called Pinky☆Distortion. Moreover, he formed a duo with singer and cellist Kanon Wakeshima, which he named KanonXKanon. Kanon was also a guest at Otakon 2010 as a panelist and a guest DJ. Miku served as the vocalist for the new visual-kei band, Lc5, which started in June 2010. Teruki played as a support drummer for the band Dog in the Parallel World Orchestra.

On April 1, 2012, An Cafe announced that they will be resuming activities and will be doing a world tour in November in Europe and the UK, the tour being named "An CaFesta '12 Summer Dive". On 30 May, An Cafe announced that they will be releasing a mini-album titled Amazing Blue on August 8, their first release since returning from their two-year hiatus. Later in the following year, they announced a three-month consecutive single release coupled with a large tour to celebrate the band's 10th anniversary. The singles would be released in the months June, July, and August, the tour finale being on January 4, 2014 at the Nippon Budokan.

The band performed for first time in Canada at Animethon on August 9, 2014. Also they performed in Brazil at Anime Friends Convention in July and in Mexico in November for their third solo concert in the country.

Their first major debut studio album under White café, a subsidiary of Being Inc. was released in 2017, titled Laugh Song.

On June 22, 2018, An Cafe announced they would enter an indefinite hiatus, after all members were leaving the band except for Miku. They held their last concert Live Cafe 15th Anniversary Year Grand Finale at the EX Theater Roppongi, in Tokyo on January 9, 2019. The last concert was released on DVD on April 24, 2019.

== Members ==
- Miku (みく) – vocals (2003–2023)
- Kanon (カノン) – bass, backing vocals (2003–2023)
- Teruki (輝喜) – drums (2003–2023)
- Bou (坊) – guitars, backing vocals (2003–2007)
- Takuya (タクヤ) – guitars, backing vocals (2007–2023)
- Yu-ki (ゆうき, Yūki) – keyboards, synthesizers (2007–2023)

=== Equipment ===
Yu-ki (keyboards) uses a Korg X50 and a Yamaha MO6 in a firm Ultimate AX48B rack. His speaker is a Roland Jazz-Chorus 120 and he has a Mackie 1202-VLZ PRO mixing panel as well. A lot of functions are used, for instance the excessive use of pitch bend in Respect Mommy on the Yamaha MO6 and the use of his arpeggiator (on the Yamaha MO6 as well) in Cherry Saku Yuki!!.

Takuya (guitar) uses many guitars, among those being a Royal Blue Paul Reed Smith Custom 24, Black Gibson Les Paul Custom, Candy Apple Red Fender American Standard Telecaster, Dean Z, and guitar pedals, including a Korg Pitchblack, Vox Wah, Boss Super Chorus CH-1, TC Electronic ND-1 Nova Delay, MXR Phase 90, Musicom Lab EFX MK III + Audio Controller, and previously a Boss Delay DM-2. He runs his signal through Hughes and Kettner amps.

Kanon (bass) uses two basses, a Sunburst Fender American Deluxe Jazz Bass and a Black Fender Custom Shop Jazz Bass, along with an EBS Multi Comp, Providence Vitalizer, MXR D.I.+ M80 Preamp/D.I., and Basson amps.

Teruki (drums) has the following setup: one Splash Cymbal (Paiste 10"), two Crash Cymbals (Paiste 16" and 18") Cymbals, one China Cymbal (Paiste 18"), one Ride Cymbal (Zildjian 20"), one Hi-Hat (Zildjian 14"), onei-Hat stand (Pearl), a Bass Drum (Pearl 22" x 16"), a Snare (Pearl 14" x 5,5"), one Mid Tom (Pearl 12" x 8"), one Floor Tom (Pearl 16" x 16"), two Pedals (Pearl) and Behringer amplificat.

== Endorsements ==
An Cafe has been a longtime supporter and endorser of popular Japanese fashion label Sex Pot Revenge, and they are frequently seen wearing clothing from that label. They have appeared on the cover of Sex Pot Revenge free company magazine, V!nyl Syndicate.

In 2008, An Cafe vocalist Miku hosted Volume 2 of Visual Kei DVD Magazine alongside the magazine's mascot, Biju.

== International recognition ==
An Cafe has gained great success in Japan. It has also gained moderate success in Europe, mainland Asia (Korea, China), Argentina, Brazil, Chile, Canada and the United States.

In 2008, the band visited Finland, Sweden, Germany, France, the UK, Spain, the US, and Korea on their first overseas tour, "Live Cafe-Tour '08 - Nyappy Go Around World". They played a total of twelve concerts in the eight countries.

As of November 2008, An Cafe confirmed an overseas tour, "Live Cafe Tour '09 Nyappy Go Around the World II -Harajuku Dance Rock Night-" which encompassed twelve countries: Russia, Finland, Sweden, Germany, the UK, France, Spain, Argentina, Chile, Brazil, Mexico and the USA. This tour took place over March and April, playing a total of 17 dates.

In 2014, An Cafe had many overseas concerts in several countries of Europe, Canada, Brazil and Mexico.

== Discography ==
Albums

- Shikisai Moment (色彩モーメント, November 9, 2005)
- Magnya Carta (マグニャカルタ, November 29, 2006)
- Gokutama Rock Cafe (極魂ROCK CAFE, April 9, 2008)
- BB Parallel World (September 9, 2009)
- Hikagyaku Ziprock (非可逆ZiprocK, November 6, 2013)
- Laugh Song (ラフ・ソング, February 22, 2017)

EPs

- Amedama Rock (飴玉ロック, February 23, 2005)
- Ko Akuma Usagi no Koibumi to Machine Gun (小悪魔USAGIの恋文とマシンガンe.p., October 29, 2008) Oricon Singles Weekly Chart: No. 12
- Harajuku Dance Rock (March 13, 2009, North America and Europe only release)
- Amazing Blue (August 8, 2012)

Compilations

- Antic Cafe (December 9, 2009)
- Best 2015-2018 (December 5, 2018)

Singles

- "Candyholic" (キャンデーホリック, March 24, 2004) No. 75
- "√69" (June 6, 2004) No. 88
- "Komou Cosmos" (孤妄, November 24, 2004) No. 91
- "Karakuri Hitei" (カラクリ否定, March 30, 2005) No. 64
- "Tekesuta Kousen" (テケスタ光線, July 20, 2005) No. 67
- "Escapism" (エスカピズム, August 24, 2005) No. 75
- "Merrymaking" (メリメイキング, September 21, 2005) No. 63
- "10's Collection March" (10's コレクション マァチ, March 1, 2006) No. 42
- "Bonds ~Kizuna~" (BondS ～絆～, May 17, 2006) No. 39
- "Smile Ichiban Ii Onna" (スマイル一番 イイ♀, September 20, 2006) No. 32
- "Snow Scene" (スノーシ一ン, October 18, 2006) No. 26
- "Kakusei Heroism ~The Hero Without a "Name"~" (覚醒ヒロイズム～THE HERO WITHOUT A "NAME"～, August 22, 2007) No. 13
- "Ryūsei Rocket" (流星ロケット, November 7, 2007) No. 19
- "Cherry Saku Yuki!!" (Cherry咲く勇気!!, February 27, 2008) No. 20
- "Summer Dive" (August 30, 2008, live distribution only)
- "Aroma" (March 11, 2009) No. 16
- "Natsu Koi ★ Natsu Game" (夏恋★夏GAME, August 12, 2009) No. 13
- "Bee Myself Bee Yourself ~Jibun Rashiku Kimi Rashiku Umareta Story wa Hajimattenda~" (Bee Myself Bee Yourself ~自分らしく君らしく生まれたストーリーは始まってんだ~, June 12, 2013)
- "Itai Onna ~No Pain, No Love? Japan Girls in Love~" (イタイ女〜NO PAIN, NO LOVE? Japan GIRLS in LOVE〜, July 10, 2013)
- "Roman ~Let's Make Precious Love~" (狼MAN 〜Let's make precious love〜, August 14, 2013)
- "Mōsō Mo Mō Sorosoro" (モウソウモモウソロソロ, September 24, 2014)
- "Sennen DIVE!!!!!" (千年DIVE!!!!!, August 26, 2015)
- "JIBUN" (March 16, 2016)
- "Atsukunare/Ikirutame no 3 Byo Rule" (熱くなれ/生きるための3秒ルール, September 14, 2016)
- "Ikenai Moso x Abunai Monster" (イケない妄想×アブない珍獣, October 4, 2017)
- "Negaigoto wa Hitotsu sa" (願い事は1つさ, March 28, 2018)
- "Fly Again" (October 25, 2023)

DVDs

- Like An Cafe (ライカ・カフェ, October 10, 2004)
- 20051203 Shikisai a On (20051203色彩亜音, December 3, 2005)
- Yagai de Nyappy (野外でニャッピー, December 17, 2006)
- Hibiya on ★the★ o New World (HIBIYA ON★ザ★御NEW世界, July 2, 2007)
- Nyappy Go Around Fever (April 25, 2008)
- AnCafesta '08 Summer Dive (December 24, 2008)
- Live Cafe - Tour '08 Nyappy Go Around the World (March 11, 2009)
- Finale of Nyappy - Kawayusu Rock de Go Gogo!! (November 4, 2009)
- Live Cafe 2010 King of Harajuku Dance Rock Ikinari Nyappy Legend (August 22, 2010)
- AnCafesta '12 Summer Dive - Daikoukai Jidai - (March 27, 2013)
