= The Brilliant Green discography =

- Studio albums: 5
- Compilation albums: 2
- Singles: 20
- Music videos: 20

The discography of Japanese rock band the Brilliant Green consists of five studio albums, two compilation albums and 20 singles. These were released through Sony Music Records from 1997 until mid 2000, when the band moved to Sony sub-label Defstar Records. The Brilliant Green parted with Sony in 2008 after releasing the compilation album Complete Single Collection '97–'08, and began releasing music through Warner Music Japan from 2010 onwards.

== Albums ==
=== Studio albums ===
List of albums, with selected chart positions
Title	Album details	Peak positions	Sales	Certifications
Title	Album details	Oricon Albums Chart	Sales	Certifications
The Brilliant Green	Released: September 19, 1998; Label: Sony Music Records; Formats: CD, digital download	2	1,425,000	RIAJ: 3× Platinum (1,200,000)
Terra 2001	Released: September 8, 1999; Label: Sony Music Records; Formats: CD, vinyl, digital download	2	641,000	RIAJ: Platinum (400,000)
Los Angeles	Released: January 1, 2001; Label: Defstar Records; Formats: CD, SACD, digital download	2	305,000	RIAJ: Platinum (400,000)
The Winter Album	Released: December 4, 2002; Label: Defstar Records; Formats: CD, digital download	6	77,000	
Blackout	Released: September 9, 2010; Label: Warner Music Japan; Formats: CD, digital download	16	16,000	

=== Compilation albums ===
List of albums, with selected chart positions
Title	Album details	Peak positions		Sales	Certifications
Title	Album details	JPN	TWN East Asian (Note: Position was taken from 2008 week 8.)	Sales	Certifications
Complete Single Collection '97–'08	Released: February 20, 2008; Label: Defstar Records; Formats: CD, digital download	1	9	178,000	RIAJ: Gold (100,000)
The Swingin' Sixties	Rearrangement album; Released: July 23, 2014; Label: Warner Music Japan; Formats: CD, digital download	18	—	7,000	
"—" denotes items which did not chart.

== Singles ==
List of singles, with selected chart positions
Title	Year	Peak chart positions		Sales	Certifications	Album
Title	Year	Oricon Singles Chart	Billboard Japan Hot 100 (Note: The Billboard Japan Hot 100 was established in February 2008.)	Sales	Certifications	Album
"Bye Bye Mr. Mug"	1997	69	—	16,000		Non-album single
"Goodbye and Good Luck"	1997	71	—	15,000		Non-album single
"There Will Be Love There (Ai no Aru Basho)"	1998	1	97 (Note: Charted in 2008.)	876,000	RIAJ (physical): 2× Platinum (800,000); RIAJ (digital): Gold (100,000)	The Brilliant Green
"Tsumetai Hana"	1998	1	—	393,000	RIAJ (physical): Platinum (400,000)	The Brilliant Green
"Sono Speed De"	1999	1	—	459,000	RIAJ (physical): Platinum (400,000)	Terra 2001
"Nagai Tameiki no Youni"	1999	4	—	141,000	RIAJ (physical): Gold (200,000)	Terra 2001
"Ai no Ai no Hoshi"	1999	9	—	114,000	RIAJ (physical): Gold (200,000)	Terra 2001
"Call My Name"	1999	12	—	35,000		Terra 2001
"Bye! My Boy!"	1999	29	—	17,000		Terra 2001
"Hello Another Way (Sorezore no Basho)"	2000	8	—	148,000	RIAJ (physical): Gold (200,000)	Los Angeles
"Angel Song (Eve no Kane)"	2000	3	—	290,000	RIAJ (physical): Gold (200,000)	Los Angeles
"Forever to Me (Owarinaki Kanashimi)"	2002	10	—	49,000		The Winter Album
"Rainy Days Never Stays"	2002	14	—	24,000		The Winter Album
"I'm So Sorry Baby"	2002	15	—	12,000		The Winter Album
"Stand by Me"	2007	10	—	32,000		Complete Single Collection '97–'08
"Enemy"	2007	8	—	9,000		Complete Single Collection '97–'08
"Ash Like Snow"	2008	10	8	51,000	RIAJ (cellphone): Gold (100,000)	Complete Single Collection '97–'08
"Like Yesterday"	2010	17	2	9,000		Blackout
"Blue Daisy"	2010	20	12	5,000		Blackout
"I Just Can't Breathe..."	2010	33	32	4,000		Blackout
"—" denotes items which were released before the inception of the Billboard Japan Hot 100.

=== Promotional singles ===
Title	Year	Peak chart positions	Album
Title	Year	Billboard Japan Hot 100	Album
"The Lucky Star"	2001	—	Los Angeles
"Flowers"	2002	—	The Winter Album
"I'm Sick of This Place"	2010	80	Blackout
"A Little World"	2014	—	The Swingin' Sixties
"—" denotes items which did not chart.

== Video albums ==
List of media, with selected chart positions
Title	Album details	Peak positions Oricon
Clips	Released: April 21, 1999; Label: Sony Music Records; Formats: DVD, VHS	—
Super Terra 2000	Released: April 1, 2000; Label: Sony Music Records; Formats: DVD, VHS	—
Los Angeles Clips 2	Released: January 1, 2001; Label: Defstar Records; Formats: DVD	49
Music Video Collection '98–'08	Released: February 20, 2008; Label: Defstar Records; Formats: DVD	35
