= Gothic Melting Ice Cream's Darkness Nightmare =

Compilation album by Tommy heavenly^{6}
- Released: February 25, 2009
- Recorded: 2003–2009
- Genre: Rock
- Length: 78:00
- Label: DefSTAR Records
- Producer: Chiffon Brownie

Tommy heavenly^{6} chronology
Heavy Starry Heavenly (2007)	Gothic Melting Ice Cream's Darkness Nightmare (2009)	I Kill My Heart (2009)

Gothic Melting Ice Cream's Darkness Nightmare is the first compilation album from Tomoko Kawase's alter ego, Tommy heavenly^{6}. It was released on February 25, 2009 by DefSTAR Records. Its top position on the Oricon charts was number 6.

== Overview ==
There are three versions of the album, a CD only version, a CD+DVD version and a Blue-spec+DVD version. It was released on the same day as Strawberry Cream Soda Pop Daydream, a best-of album by Kawase's other alter ego Tommy February6.

The album contains all of Heavenly6's singles from Wait Till I Can Dream to Papermoon in consecutive order, in addition to select album tracks from Tommy Heavenly6 and Heavy Starry Heavenly and a B-side from Hey My Friend. The DVD contains music videos of Heavenly6's singles, "Swear" (from Wait Till I Can Dream), and "Unlimited Sky". It also features making-of clips for certain videos. A limited digital download single titled "Unlimited Sky" was released to promote the best album. The single contained the original song, as well as an acoustic version. The song also appears on the album.

== Track listing ==
All lyrics are written by Tomoko Kawase; all music is composed by Chiffon Brownie and Tomoko Kawase.

CD
No.	Title	Original album	Length
1.	"Wait till I Can Dream"	Tommy heavenly^{6}
2.	"Hey My Friend"	Tommy heavenly^{6}
3.	"Ready?"	Tommy heavenly^{6}
4.	"I'm Gonna Scream+"	Heavy Starry Heavenly
5.	"Pray"	Heavy Starry Heavenly
6.	"Lollipop Candy Bad Girl"	Heavy Starry Heavenly
7.	"I Love Xmas"	Heavy Starry Heavenly
8.	"Heavy Starry Chain"	Heavy Starry Heavenly
9.	"Papermoon"	Released as a single only
10.	"LCDD"	Tommy heavenly^{6}
11.	"Roller Coaster Ride"	B-side of Hey My Friend
12.	"Fell in Love with You"	Tommy heavenly^{6}
13.	"Gimme All of Your Love!!"	Tommy heavenly^{6}
14.	"Going 2 My Way!"	Heavy Starry Heavenly
15.	"Wanna Be Your Idol"	Tommy heavenly^{6}
16.	"Lucky Me"	Heavy Starry Heavenly
17.	"+Gothic Pink+"	Tommy heavenly^{6}
18.	"2Bfree"	Tommy heavenly^{6}
19.	"Unlimited Sky"	Promotional single

DVD
No.	Title	Description	Length
1.	"Wait till I Can Dream"	Music Video
2.	"Swear"	Music Video
3.	"Hey My Friend"	Music Video
4.	"Ready?"	Music Video
5.	"Making Digest 01"	Making of "Wait till I Can Dream", "Swear", "Hey My Friend", and "Ready?"
6.	"I'm Gonna Scream+"	Music Video
7.	"Pray"	Music Video
8.	"Lollipop Candy Bad Girl"	Music Video
9.	"I Love Xmas"	Music Video
10.	"Heavy Starry Chain"	Music Video
11.	"Making Digest 02"	Making of "Heavy Starry Chain"
12.	"Papermoon"	Music Video
13.	"Unlimited Sky"	Music Video
