= Bye! My Boy! =

1999 single by the Brilliant Green

Single by the Brilliant Green

from the album Terra 2001
- B-side: "There Will Be Love There (Ai no Aru Basho)" "Nagai Tameiki no Youni"
- Released: December 1, 1999; October 1, 2000 (reissue)
- Recorded: 1999
- Genre: J-pop
- Length: 15:14
- Label: Sony Music Records; Defstar Records (reissue)
- Composer(s): Shunsaku Okuda
- Lyricist(s): Tomoko Kawase
- Producer(s): Shunsaku Okuda

The Brilliant Green singles chronology
"Call My Name" (1999)	"Bye! My Boy!" (1999)	"Hello Another Way (Sorezore no Basho)" (2000)

Music video
- "Bye! My Boy!" on YouTube

"Bye! My Boy!" is the Brilliant Green's ninth single, released on December 1, 1999, by Sony Music Records, and reissued on October 1, 2000, by Defstar Records. It peaked at #29 on the Oricon Singles Chart.

The song also appears on the band's compilation album, Complete Single Collection '97–'08 (2008).

== Track listing ==
All lyrics are written by Tomoko Kawase; all music is composed by Shunsaku Okuda

No.	Title	Length
1.	"Bye! My Boy!"	3:24
2.	"There Will Be Love There (Ai no Aru Basho)" (Demo Version)	4:03
3.	"Nagai Tameiki no Youni" (Demo Version)	4:23
4.	"Bye! My Boy!" (Instrumental Version)	3:24
Total length:		15:14
