= The Swingin' Sixties =

Remix album by The Brilliant Green
- Released: July 23, 2014
- Recorded: 2014
- Genre: Rock and roll
- Language: Japanese; English
- Label: Warner Music Japan
- Producer: Shunsaku Okuda; Tomoko Kawase

The Brilliant Green chronology
Blackout (2010)	The Swingin' Sixties (2014)

The Swingin' Sixties is a remix album released by The Brilliant Green. It was released on July 23, 2014. The album contains a selection of the band's songs, described as "love songs and hits", re-recorded in a 60's style. The album also contains one new track, "A Little World". The album debuted at #18 on the Oricon Albums chart.

== Track listing ==
All lyrics are written by Tomoko Kawase, except "A Little World" by Kawase and James De Barrado; all music is composed by Shunsaku Okuda

No.	Title	Original album	Length
1.	"There Will Be Love There -Ai no Aru Basho- (愛のある場所, A Place with Love)"	The Brilliant Green	3:59
2.	"Tsumetai Hana (冷たい花, Cold Flowers)"	The Brilliant Green	4:37
3.	"You & I"	The Brilliant Green	4:22
4.	"Rock'n Roll"	The Brilliant Green	3:28
5.	"Hello Another Way -Sorezore no Basho- (それぞれの場所, Every Place)"	Los Angeles	5:37
6.	"Stand by me"	Complete Singles Collection '97–'08	3:46
7.	"Bye Bye Mr. Mug"	Complete Singles Collection '97–'08	4:35
8.	"Blue Daisy"	Blackout	5:53
9.	"Sono Speed De (そのスピードで, At Light Speed)"	Terra 2001	5:08
10.	"Nagai Tameiki no Youni (長いため息のように, Like a Long Sigh)"	Terra 2001	4:37
11.	"A Little World"	new song	2:42
Total length:			49:00

== Charts ==
Chart (2014)	Peak position
Japan Oricon Weekly Albums	18
