= Ryo Matsui (musician) =

Japanese guitarist and composer

Ryo Matsui 松井 亮
- Also known as: meister; K-smith
- Born: February 11, 1972 (age 54); Kyoto Prefecture, Japan
- Occupations: Musician; composer; arranger; record producer
- Instrument: Guitar
- Years active: 1995–present
- Formerly of: The Brilliant Green

Ryo Matsui (Japanese: 松井 亮, Hepburn: Matsui Ryō; born February 11, 1972) is a Japanese guitarist, composer, arranger and record producer. He was a founding member of the rock band The Brilliant Green, serving as its guitarist from 1995 until his departure in 2010, and records solo material under the name meister.

== Career ==
Matsui was born in Kyoto Prefecture. In 1995, he and his high-school classmate Shunsaku Okuda formed The Brilliant Green after recruiting vocalist Tomoko Kawase. The band made its major-label debut in 1997. Matsui also played guitar for Kawase's solo project Tommy February6 under the name K-smith.

In 2004, Matsui launched the solo project meister. Its debut album, I Met the Music, was recorded with international collaborators including Howard Jones, Mark Gardener, Manda Rin, Gary Stringer, Maria Solheim, Loz Colbert and Nick Beggs. The album was released by Defstar Records on October 27, 2004. The following month, meister released "Above the Clouds", featuring singer-songwriter Bonnie Pink.

Matsui left The Brilliant Green on May 10, 2010, citing personal reasons. He subsequently continued working as a composer, arranger, guitarist and producer, including music for advertising and songs for other performers.

== Discography ==
=== As meister ===
Studio album

- I Met the Music (2004)

Singles

- "I Want You to Show Me" (2004)
- "Above the Clouds" (2004)

=== As Ryo Matsui ===
Albums

- Chaos Life vol.1 (2024)
- Chaos Life vol.2 (2024)
