= Forever to Me (Owarinaki Kanashimi) =

2002 single by the Brilliant Green

Single by the Brilliant Green

from the album The Winter Album
- B-side: "I'm a Player in T.V. Games" "Alone Alone"
- Released: April 24, 2002
- Recorded: 2002
- Genre: J-pop
- Length: 11:31
- Label: Defstar Records
- Songwriter(s): Tomoko Kawase, Shunsaku Okuda
- Producer(s): Shunsaku Okuda

The Brilliant Green singles chronology
"Angel Song (Eve no Kane)" (2000)	"Forever to Me (Owarinaki Kanashimi)" (2002)	"Rainy Days Never Stays" (2002)

Music video
- "Forever to Me (Owarinaki Kanashimi)" on YouTube

"Forever to Me (Owarinaki Kanashimi)" (Japanese: Forever to Me 〜終わりなき悲しみ〜, lit. 'Forever to Me (Endless Sorrow)') is the Brilliant Green's twelfth single, released on April 24, 2002. It peaked at #10 on the Oricon Singles Chart.

The song also appears on the band's compilation album, Complete Single Collection '97–'08 (2008).

== Track listing ==
All lyrics are written by Tomoko Kawase; all music is composed by Shunsaku Okuda

No.	Title	Length
1.	"Forever to Me (Owarinaki Kanashimi)" (Forever to Me 〜終わりなき悲しみ〜, Forever to Me (Endless Sorrow))	5:06
2.	"I'm a Player in T.V. Games"	3:08
3.	"Alone Alone"	3:17
Total length:		11:31
