= Papermoon (song) =

Single by Tommy heavenly^{6}

from the album Gothic Melting Ice Cream's Darkness Nightmare
- B-side: "Ruby Shoes"
- Released: December 10, 2008
- Genre: J-POP, Pop punk
- Label: Defstar Records
- Songwriters: Tomoko Kawase, Chiffon Brownie

Tommy heavenly^{6} singles chronology
"Heavy Starry Chain" (2006)	"Papermoon" (2008)	"Unlimited Sky" (2009)

CD+DVD version

"Papermoon" (stylized as "PAPERMOON") is Tommy heavenly^{6}'s 9th single and Tomoko Kawase's 16th single overall, which was released on December 10, 2008. Since The Brilliant Green made their comeback, Kawase had been very inactive as a solo singer. Since "Papermoon" has been released, it marks her first solo single in over a year. "Papermoon" was featured as the second opening song to the anime Soul Eater. "Papermoon"'s B-side is a song called "Ruby Shoes", which is possibly in reference to the overall theme of the "Papermoon" music video. "Papermoon" peaked at #10 on the Oricon singles chart.

== Music video ==
The music video features Tommy heavenly^{6} and her band in a setting which resembles The Wizard of Oz. Her band is dressed in matching attire featuring a tin man, scarecrow, and a lion. Kawase herself is dressed up to resemble Dorothy. Kawase is also shown singing in a room that very much resembles a scene in The Wizard of Oz in which Dorothy's house is taken up into the tornado. Dorothy then looks out the window of her room to see many things and people familiar to her. In the video, things and people from Tommy heavenly^{6}'s past videos can be seen. Such as, Tommy February^{6} and Santa Claus riding a panda bear from Tommy heavenly^{6}'s "I Love Xmas" PV, to the cart pulled by a bull she rides in in her "Pray" PV, and other miscellaneous objects.

== Track listing ==
All lyrics are written by Tomoko Kawase, all music composed and arranged by Chiffon Brownie.

Disc 1: CD
No.	Title	Length
1.	"Papermoon"
2.	"Ruby Shoes"
3.	"Papermoon" (Original Instrumental)

Disc 2: DVD
No.	Title	Length
1.	"Papermoon" (music video)
