= Hello Another Way (Sorezore no Basho) =

2000 single by the Brilliant Green

Single by the Brilliant Green

from the album Los Angeles
- B-side: "Koi wa Kirakira Boshi"
- Released: May 31, 2000; October 1, 2000 (reissue)
- Recorded: 2000
- Genre: J-pop
- Length: 8:31
- Label: Sony Music Records; Defstar Records (reissue)
- Songwriter(s): Tomoko Kawase, Shunsaku Okuda
- Producer(s): Shunsaku Okuda

The Brilliant Green singles chronology
"Bye! My Boy!" (1999)	"Hello Another Way (Sorezore no Basho)" (2000)	"Angel Song (Eve no Kane)" (2000)

Music video
- "Hello Another Way (Sorezore no Basho)" on YouTube

"Hello Another Way (Sorezore no Basho)" (Japanese: Hello Another Way -それぞれの場所-, lit. 'Hello Another Way (Every Place)') is the Brilliant Green's tenth single, released on May 31, 2000, by Sony Music Records, and reissued on October 1, 2000, by Defstar Records. It peaked at #8 on the Oricon Singles Chart.

The song also appears on the band's compilation albums, Complete Single Collection '97–'08 (2008) and The Swingin' Sixties (2014).

== Track listing ==
All lyrics are written by Tomoko Kawase; all music is composed by Shunsaku Okuda

No.	Title	Length
1.	"Hello Another Way (Sorezore no Basho)" (Hello Another Way -それぞれの場所-, Hello Another Way (Every Place))	5:33
2.	"Koi wa Kirakira Boshi" (恋はキラキラ星☆☆☆, Love Is a Sparkling Star)	2:58
Total length:		8:31
