= Ai no Ai no Hoshi =

1999 single by the Brilliant Green

Single by the Brilliant Green

from the album Terra 2001
- B-side: "Funny Girlfriend!!"
- Released: August 18, 1999; October 1, 2000 (reissue)
- Recorded: 1999
- Genre: J-pop
- Length: 6:23
- Label: Sony Music Records; Defstar Records (reissue)
- Songwriter(s): Tomoko Kawase, Shunsaku Okuda
- Producer(s): Shunsaku Okuda

The Brilliant Green singles chronology
"Nagai Tameiki no Youni" (1999)	"Ai no Ai no Hoshi" (1999)	"Call My Name" (1999)

Music video
- "Ai no Ai no Hoshi" on YouTube

"Ai no Ai no Hoshi" (Japanese: 愛の♥愛の星, lit. 'Star of Love') is the Brilliant Green's seventh single, released on August 18, 1999, by Sony Music Records, and reissued on October 1, 2000, by Defstar Records. It peaked at #9 on the Oricon Singles Chart.

The song also appears on the band's compilation album, Complete Single Collection '97–'08 (2008).

== Track listing ==
All lyrics are written by Tomoko Kawase; all music is composed by Shunsaku Okuda

No.	Title	Length
1.	"Ai no Ai no Hoshi" (愛の♥愛の星, Star of Love)	3:51
2.	"Funny Girlfriend!!"	2:32
Total length:		6:23

== Cover versions ==
- The song was covered by Tommy february^{6} and appeared as a B-side on her 2013 single "Be My Valentine (Lovely Valentine's Day)". The cover also appeared on her 2013 album Tommy Candy Shop Sugar Me.
