= Rainy Days Never Stays =

2002 single by the Brilliant Green

Single by the Brilliant Green

from the album The Winter Album
- B-side: "Moldy Hole!!" "Wishing You"
- Released: July 31, 2002
- Recorded: 2002
- Genre: J-pop
- Length: 9:35
- Label: Defstar Records
- Songwriter(s): Tomoko Kawase, Shunsaku Okuda
- Producer(s): Shunsaku Okuda

The Brilliant Green singles chronology
"Forever to Me (Owarinaki Kanashimi)" (2002)	"Rainy Days Never Stays" (2002)	"I'm So Sorry Baby" (2002)

Music video
- "Rainy Days Never Stays" on YouTube

"Rainy Days Never Stays" is the Brilliant Green's thirteenth single, released on July 31, 2002. It peaked at #14 on the Oricon Singles Chart.

The song also appears on the band's compilation album, Complete Single Collection '97–'08 (2008).

== Track listing ==
All lyrics are written by Tomoko Kawase; all music is composed by Shunsaku Okuda

No.	Title	Length
1.	"Rainy Days Never Stays"	3:55
2.	"Moldy Hole!!"	2:38
3.	"Wishing You"	3:02
Total length:		9:35
