= I'm So Sorry Baby =

2002 single by the Brilliant Green

Single by the Brilliant Green

from the album The Winter Album
- B-side: "I'm Jus' Lovin' You" "French Girl"
- Released: October 9, 2002
- Recorded: 2002
- Genre: J-pop
- Length: 17:00
- Label: Defstar Records
- Songwriter(s): Tomoko Kawase, Shunsaku Okuda
- Producer(s): Shunsaku Okuda

The Brilliant Green singles chronology
"Rainy Days Never Stays" (2002)	"I'm So Sorry Baby" (2002)	"Stand by Me" (2007)

Music video
- "I'm So Sorry Baby" on YouTube

"I'm So Sorry Baby" is the Brilliant Green's fourteenth single, released on October 9, 2002. It peaked at #15 on the Oricon Singles Chart.

The song also appears on the band's compilation album, Complete Single Collection '97–'08 (2008).

== Track listing ==
All lyrics are written by Tomoko Kawase; all music is composed by Shunsaku Okuda

No.	Title	Length
1.	"I'm So Sorry Baby"	4:48
2.	"I'm Jus' Lovin' You"	3:32
3.	"French Girl"	3:26
4.	"I'm So Sorry Baby" (Instrumental Version)	4:47
Total length:		17:00
