= Sono Speed De =

1999 single by the Brilliant Green

Single by the Brilliant Green

from the album Terra 2001
- B-side: "Rock'n Roll" (Live at Shibuya Club Quattro)
- Released: January 27, 1999; October 1, 2000 (reissue)
- Recorded: 1999
- Genre: J-pop
- Length: 14:26
- Label: Sony Music Records; Defstar Records (reissue)
- Songwriter(s): Tomoko Kawase
- Producer(s): Shunsaku Okuda

The Brilliant Green singles chronology
"Tsumetai Hana" (1998)	"Sono Speed De" (1999)	"Nagai Tameiki no Youni" (1999)

Music video
- "Sono Speed De" on YouTube

"Sono Speed De" (Japanese: そのスピードで, lit. 'At That Speed') is the Brilliant Green's fifth single, released on January 27, 1999, by Sony Music Records, and reissued on October 1, 2000, by Defstar Records. It peaked at #1 on the Oricon Singles Chart, and was the band's third #1 single. It was the opening theme song for Fuji Television's 1999 TV drama Over Time.

The song also appears on the band's compilation albums, Complete Single Collection '97–'08 (2008) and The Swingin' Sixties (2014).

== Track listing ==
All lyrics are written by Tomoko Kawase; all music is composed by Shunsaku Okuda

No.	Title	Length
1.	"Sono Speed De" (そのスピードで, At Light Speed)	5:13
2.	"Rock'n Roll" (Live at Shibuya Club Quattro)	4:03
3.	"Sono Speed De" (Instrumental Version)	5:10
Total length:		14:26

== Other versions ==
- An acoustic English version of "Sono Speed De" appeared on the 2010 single "Like Yesterday" with the title "At Light Speed".
