= Call My Name (The Brilliant Green song) =

1999 single by the Brilliant Green

Single by the Brilliant Green

from the album Terra 2001
- B-side: "Call My Name" (English Version)
- Released: September 22, 1999; October 1, 2000 (reissue)
- Recorded: 1999
- Genre: J-pop
- Length: 15:34
- Label: Sony Music Records; Defstar Records (reissue)
- Songwriter(s): Tomoko Kawase
- Producer(s): Shunsaku Okuda

The Brilliant Green singles chronology
"Ai no Ai no Hoshi" (1999)	"Call My Name" (1999)	"Bye! My Boy!" (1999)

Music video
- "Call My Name" on YouTube

"Call My Name" is the Brilliant Green's eighth single, released on September 22, 1999, by Sony Music Records, and reissued on October 1, 2000, by Defstar Records. It peaked at #12 on the Oricon Singles Chart.

The song also appears on the band's compilation album, Complete Single Collection '97–'08 (2008).

== Track listing ==
All lyrics are written by Tomoko Kawase; all music is composed by Shunsaku Okuda

No.	Title	Length
1.	"Call My Name" (Japanese Version)	5:12
2.	"Call My Name" (English Version)	5:12
3.	"Call My Name" (Instrumental Version)	5:10
Total length:		15:34
