= Enemy (The Brilliant Green song) =

2007 single by the Brilliant Green

Single by the Brilliant Green

from the album Complete Single Collection '97–'08
- B-side: "Angel Song" (Acoustic Version)
- Released: December 12, 2007
- Recorded: 2007
- Genre: J-pop
- Length: 14:16
- Label: Defstar Records
- Songwriter(s): Tomoko Kawase; Shunsaku Okuda
- Producer(s): Shunsaku Okuda

The Brilliant Green singles chronology
"Stand by Me" (2007)	"Enemy" (2007)	"Ash Like Snow" (2008)

Music video
- "Enemy" on YouTube

"Enemy" is the Brilliant Green's sixteenth single, released on December 12, 2007. It peaked at #21 on the Oricon Singles Chart.

== Track listing ==
All lyrics are written by Tomoko Kawase; all music is composed by Shunsaku Okuda

No.	Title	Length
1.	"Enemy"	4:58
2.	"Angel Song" (Acoustic Version)	4:23
3.	"Enemy" (Instrumental Version)	4:55
Total length:		14:16
