= Like Yesterday =

2010 single by the Brilliant Green

Single by the Brilliant Green

from the album Blackout
- B-side: "Spring Gate", "At Light Speed"
- Released: February 24, 2010
- Genre: J-pop, pop rock
- Length: 4:40
- Label: Warner Music Japan
- Songwriters: Tomoko Kawase, Shunsaku Okuda
- Producer: Shunsaku Okuda

The Brilliant Green singles chronology
"Ash Like Snow" (2008)	"Like Yesterday" (2010)	"Blue Daisy" (2010)

Music video
- "Like Yesterday" on YouTube

"Like Yesterday" is Japanese band the Brilliant Green's 18th single, released on February 24, 2010. It was the band's first release with Warner after 11 years with Defstar Records, and their first since their greatest hits collection Complete Single Collection '97–'08.

== Track listing ==
All lyrics are written by Tomoko Kawase; all music is composed by Shunsaku Okuda, arranged by Shunsaku Okuda.

No.	Title	Length
1.	"Like Yesterday"	4:40
2.	"Spring Gate"	4:30
3.	"At Light Speed" ("Sono Speed De" English Ver.)	5:06
Total length:		14:03

DVD
No.	Title	Length
1.	"Like Yesterday" (Music Video)

== Chart rankings ==
"Like Yesterday"
A sample of the chorus of "Like Yesterday."

Chart	Peak position
Oricon Weekly Singles Chart	17
Billboard Japan Hot 100	2
Billboard Adult Contemporary Airplay	3
RIAJ Digital Track Chart Top 100	41

=== Reported sales ===
Chart	Amount
Oricon physical sales	8,600
