= Angel Song (Eve no Kane) =

2000 single by the Brilliant Green

Single by the Brilliant Green

from the album Los Angeles
- B-side: "Kuroi Tsubasa" "Shiroi Yuki to Shanpan to X'mas Song"
- Released: November 15, 2000
- Recorded: 2000
- Genre: J-pop
- Length: 14:50
- Label: Defstar Records
- Composer(s): Shunsaku Okuda
- Lyricist(s): Tomoko Kawase
- Producer(s): Shunsaku Okuda

The Brilliant Green singles chronology
"Hello Another Way (Sorezore no Basho)" (2000)	"Angel Song (Eve no Kane)" (2000)	"Forever to Me (Owarinaki Kanashimi)" (2002)

Music video
- "Angel Song (Eve no Kane)" on YouTube

"Angel Song (Eve no Kane)" (Japanese: Angel Song -イヴの鐘-, lit. 'Angel Song (Eve Bells)') is the Brilliant Green's eleventh single, released on November 15, 2000. It peaked at #3 on the Oricon Singles Chart. It was used as the theme song for the 2000 Japanese TV drama Merry Christmas in Midsummer.

The song also appears on the band's compilation album, Complete Single Collection '97–'08 (2008).

== Track listing ==
All lyrics are written by Tomoko Kawase; all music is composed by Shunsaku Okuda

No.	Title	Length
1.	"Angel Song (Eve no Kane)" (Angel Song -イヴの鐘-, Angel Song (Eve Bells))	4:25
2.	"Kuroi Tsubasa" (黒い翼, Black Wings)	3:11
3.	"Shiroi Yuki to Shanpan to X'mas Song" (白い雪とシャンパンとX'mas Song; White Snow, Champagne, and X'mas Song)	2:52
4.	"Angel Song (Eve no Kane)" (Instrumental Version)	4:22
Total length:		14:50
