= Nagai Tameiki no Youni =

1999 single by the Brilliant Green

Single by the Brilliant Green

from the album Terra 2001
- B-side: "Maybe We Could Go Back to Then"
- Released: March 10, 1999; October 1, 2000 (reissue)
- Recorded: 1999
- Genre: J-pop
- Length: 15:16
- Label: Sony Music Records; Defstar Records (reissue)
- Songwriter(s): Tomoko Kawase
- Producer(s): Shunsaku Okuda

The Brilliant Green singles chronology
"Sono Speed De" (1998)	"Nagai Tameiki no Youni" (1999)	"Ai no Ai no Hoshi" (1999)

Music video
- "Nagai Tameiki no Youni" on YouTube

"Nagai Tameiki no Youni" (Japanese: 長いため息のように, lit. 'Like a Long Sigh') is the Brilliant Green's sixth single, released on March 10, 1999, by Sony Music Records, and reissued on October 1, 2000, by Defstar Records. It peaked at #4 on the Oricon Singles Chart.

The song also appears on the band's compilation albums, Complete Single Collection '97–'08 (2008) and The Swingin' Sixties (2014).

== Track listing ==
All lyrics are written by Tomoko Kawase; all music is composed by Shunsaku Okuda

No.	Title	Length
1.	"Nagai Tameiki no Youni" (長いため息のように, Like a Long Sigh)	5:37
2.	"Maybe We Could Go Back to Then"	4:02
3.	"Nagai Tameiki no Youni" (Instrumental Version)	5:37
Total length:		15:16
