= Goodbye and Good Luck (song) =

Single by the Brilliant Green
- B-side: "Yes" "I Never Dreamed" "Mister Moon"
- Released: December 1, 1997; October 1, 2000 (reissue)
- Genre: J-pop
- Length: 16:05
- Label: Sony Music Records; Defstar Records (reissue)
- Songwriter(s): Tomoko Kawase; Shunsaku Okuda
- Producer(s): The Brilliant Green

The Brilliant Green singles chronology
"Bye Bye Mr. Mug" (1997)	"Goodbye and Good Luck" (1997)	"There Will Be Love There (Ai no Aru Basho)" (1998)

Audio
- "Goodbye and Good Luck" on YouTube

"Goodbye and Good Luck" is the second single by Japanese rock band the Brilliant Green. It was released by Sony Music Records on December 1, 1997, and reissued by Defstar Records on October 1, 2000. This single was never released on a studio album. It peaked at #71 on the Oricon Singles Chart.

In 2008, the song was included on the B-side of the band's single "Ash Like Snow" and on their compilation album Complete Single Collection '97–'08.

== Track listing ==
All lyrics are written by Tomoko Kawase; all music is composed by Shunsaku Okuda, arranged by the Brilliant Green.

No.	Title	Length
1.	"Goodbye and Good Luck"	4:33
2.	"Yes"	2:41
3.	"I Never Dreamed"	3:55
4.	"Mister Moon"	4:56
Total length:		16:05
