= Tommy February6 =

Tommy February^{6}

Studio album by Tommy February^{6}
- Released: February 6, 2002
- Recorded: 2001
- Genres: J-pop; Synthpop; techno
- Length: 44:24
- Label: Defstar Records
- Producers: Tommy February^{6}; Malibu Convertible

Tommy February^{6} chronology
Tommy February^{6} (2002)	Tommy Airline (2004)

Singles from Tommy February6
- 1. "Everyday at the Bus Stop" Released: July 25, 2001; 2. "Kiss One More Time" Released: November 21, 2001; 3. "Bloomin'!" Released: January 17, 2002

Tommy February^{6} is the debut album of the Brilliant Green vocalist Tomoko Kawase's alter ego Tommy February^{6} (so named after Kawase's birthday). The album, in addition to launching Kawase's solo career, also established Tommy February^{6}'s trademark sound, which is heavily influenced by 80's synthpop music.

Most of the lyrics on the album's original material (all written by Kawase) are either dominated by English lyrics with occasional Japanese lines, or are wholly in English – despite the fact that Kawase reportedly cannot speak much of the language – with only one song ("The Rose Fragrance.") sung entirely in Japanese.

The original first pressing of the album came with a promotional DVD that included music videos, karaoke videos and furitsuke (choreography) videos for "Kiss One More Time" and "Bloomin'!". Also included was the making of the PV's for "Kiss One More Time", "Bloomin'!" and "Candy Pop in Love"

== Track listing ==
All lyrics are written by Tommy February^{6}; all music is composed by Malibu Convertible, except #10 by Bob Crewe and Bob Gaudio, all songs arranged by Malibu Convertible

No.	Title	Length
1.	"T.O.M.M.Y"
2.	"Everyday at the Bus Stop"
3.	"Tommy Feb Latte, Macaron."
4.	"Bloomin'!"
5.	"Hey Bad Boy"
6.	"Kiss One More Time"
7.	"Where Are You? "My Hero""
8.	"Walk Away From You My Babe"
9.	"Love Never Sleeps"
10.	"Can't Take My Eyes Off of You" (Frankie Valli cover)
11.	"I'll Be Your Angel"
12.	"Candy Pop in Love"

== Charts ==
=== Weekly charts ===
Chart (2002)	Peak position
Japanese Albums (Oricon)	1

=== Monthly charts ===
Chart (2002)	Peak position
Japanese Albums (Oricon)	2

=== Year-end charts ===
Chart (2002)	Position
Japanese Albums (Oricon)	17

== Sales and certifications ==
Region	Certification	Certified units/sales
Japan (RIAJ)	Platinum	713,719

== Personnel ==
- Tommy February^{6} – lead and backing vocals
- Malibu Convertible – keyboards, guitar, drum programming, arrangements
- Team Real Men – backing vocals (tracks: 3, 10)

=== Production ===
- Tommy February^{6} – executive producer
- Malibu Convertible – producer, arranger, recording engineer, mixing engineer
- Auspicious Feather – recording engineer, mixing engineer (tracks: 2, 8)
- Dark Undercover – assistant engineer (tracks: 2, 8)
