= Let's Go Out =

Single by Amoyamo

from the album Flash
- B-side: "OMG!!"
- Released: October 31, 2012
- Genre: Pop rock
- Label: Defstar Records
- Songwriter: Tomoko Kawase
- Producer: Tomoko Kawase

Amoyamo singles chronology
"Let's Go Out" (2012)	"Live / Magic" (2013)

"Let's Go Out" is the debut single by Japanese pop duo Amoyamo. It was released October 31, 2012. The single peaked at number 23 on the Oricon singles chart and charted for five weeks. "Let's Go Out" was used as the twelfth opening song for Gintama. The single included a cover of "Pray" by Tommy heavenly^{6}, which was the original Gintama opening.

== Track listing ==
All lyrics are written by Tomoko Kawase; all music is composed by Shunsaku Okuda.

No.	Title	Length
1.	"Let's Go Out"
2.	"OMG!!"
3.	"Freeze!"
4.	"Pray" (Tommy heavenly^{6} Cover)
