= Je t'aime je t'aime =

2003 single by Tomoko Kawase

Single by Tommy February6

from the album Tommy Airline
- Released: February 6, 2003
- Recorded: 2003
- Genre: J-pop
- Length: 23:00
- Label: Defstar Records
- Songwriters: Shunsaku Okuda (music, as Malibu Convertible); Tomoko Kawase (lyricist)
- Producer: Shunsaku Okuda

Tommy February6 singles chronology
"Bloomin'!" (2002)	"Je t'aime je t'aime" (2003)	"Love Is Forever" (2003)

"Je t'aime je t'aime" is Tomoko Kawase's fourth single released as Tommy February6, and the first single for her second studio album, "Tommy Airline". The single was released on February 6, 2003, peaking at number 5 in Japan and staying in the charts for 14 weeks. The title means "I Love You, I Love You" in French.

== Track listing ==
All lyrics are written by Tomoko Kawase (except Track 2); all music is composed by Shunsaku Okuda as Malibu Convertible (except Track 2).

No.	Title	Writer(s)	Length
1.	"Je t'aime je t'aime"	Tomoko Kawase	4:55
2.	"I'm in the Mood for Dancing" (The Nolans Cover)	Ben Findon, Mike Myers, and Bob Puzey	3:06
3.	"Je t'aime je t'aime" (Extended Version)	Tomoko Kawase	6:44
4.	"Je t'aime je t'aime" (Instrumental Version)	Tomoko Kawase	5:01
5.	"Tommy's Message" (Hidden Track)	Tomoko Kawase	2:15
Total length:			23:00
