= Lonely in Gorgeous =

Single by Tommy february^{6}
- B-side: Is This Feeling Love?; E-mail More
- Released: November 30, 2005
- Recorded: 2005
- Genre: Pop
- Length: 17:00
- Label: Defstar Records
- Songwriter(s): Tomoko Kawase
- Producer(s): Malibu Convertible

Tommy february^{6} singles chronology
"Lovely: Yume Miru Lovely Boy" (2004)	"Lonely in Gorgeous" (2005)	"Strawberry Cream Soda Pop" (2009)

"Lonely in Gorgeous" is the eighth single released by Tomoko Kawase under the name Tommy february^{6}, and the last single released before her four-year hiatus. "Lonely in Gorgeous" is the opening song for the anime Paradise Kiss. It was released on November 30, 2005, and peaked at #20 in Japan and stayed on the charts for three weeks.

== Track listing ==
All lyrics are written by Tomoko Kawase; all music is composed by Malibu Convertible

CD
No.	Title	Length
1.	"Lonely in Gorgeous"	4:03
2.	"Is This Feeling Love?"	4:40
3.	"E-mail More"	4:06
4.	"Lonely in Gorgeous (Instrumental)"	4:01
Total length:		17:00

== Music video ==
The Lonely in Gorgeous video is a parody of Beastie Boys' video for Sabotage.
