= Stand by Me (The Brilliant Green song) =

2007 single by the Brilliant Green

Single by the Brilliant Green

from the album Complete Single Collection '97–'08
- Released: August 22, 2007
- Recorded: 2007
- Genre: J-pop
- Length: 12:09
- Label: Defstar Records
- Songwriter(s): Tomoko Kawase, Shunsaku Okuda
- Producer(s): Shunsaku Okuda

The Brilliant Green singles chronology
"I'm So Sorry Baby" (2002)	"Stand by Me" (2007)	"Enemy" (2007)

Music video
- "Stand by Me" on YouTube

"Stand by Me" is the Brilliant Green's fifteenth single, released on August 22, 2007. It peaked at #10 on the Oricon Singles Chart.

== Track listing ==
All lyrics are written by Tomoko Kawase; all music is composed by Shunsaku Okuda

No.	Title	Length
1.	"Stand by Me"	3:40
2.	"Gloomy Sunday"	4:48
3.	"Stand by Me" (Instrumental Version)	3:40
Total length:		12:09
