= I'm Gonna Scream =

"I'm Gonna Scream+"

Single by Tommy heavenly^{6}

from the album Heavy Starry Heavenly
- Released: June 7, 2006
- Genre: Rock
- Label: DefSTAR Records
- Songwriter(s): Tomoko Kawase, Chiffon Brownie
- Producer(s): Chiffon Brownie

Tommy heavenly^{6} singles chronology
"Ready?" (2005)	"I'm Gonna Scream+" (2006)	"Pray" (2006)

CD+DVD Version

"I'm Gonna Scream+" is Tomoko Kawase's fourth single released as Tommy heavenly^{6}. The single was released on June 7, 2006 by DefSTAR Records, and peaked at #22 on the Oricon singles chart. "I'm Gonna Scream+" was the first single for Tommy heavenly^{6}'s second studio album: Heavy Starry Heavenly.

== Track listing ==
CD
No.	Title	Writer(s)	Producer(s)	Length
1.	"I'm Gonna Scream+"	Tomoko Kawase	Jeffrey Stevens	4:26
2.	"Going 2 My Way"	Tomoko Kawase	Jeffrey Stevens	4:26
3.	"+Gothic Pink+" (Melancholic guitar version)	Tomoko Kawase	Lucy Henson and Chris Walker	3:25
4.	"I'm Gonna Scream+" (Original Instrumental)		Jeffrey Stevens	4:24

DVD
No.	Title	Length
1.	"I'm Gonna Scream+ (Music Video)"	4:30

== Music video ==
Tomoko Kawase is seen capturing ghosts in the "I'm Gonna Scream+ video.

A music video for I'm Gonna Scream+ was released featuring Tommy in a haunted Candyland world, wielding a scythe, fighting off ghosts, a knight, and an army of Tarako Kewpie dolls. A second Tommy is seen in the clouds aiding the first Tommy on her journey.
