= Bloomin'! =

Single by Tommy february^{6}

from the album Tommy february^{6}
- Released: 17 January 2002
- Recorded: 2002
- Genre: Pop
- Length: 15:00
- Label: Defstar Records
- Songwriter: Tomoko Kawase
- Producer: Malibu Convertible

Tommy february^{6} singles chronology
"Kiss One More Time" (2001)	"Bloomin'!" (2002)	"Je t'aime je t'aime" (2003)

"Bloomin'!" is the third single released by Tomoko Kawase under the name Tommy February^{6}, and the last single released for the Tommy February^{6} album. It peaked at number 10 on the Oricon singles chart.

== Track listing ==
All lyrics are written by Tomoko Kawase; all music is composed by Malibu Convertible.

No.	Title	Length
1.	"Bloomin'!"	3:40
2.	"Bloomin'! (Onganku Mix)"	6:53
3.	"Bloomin'! (Instrumental)"	3:39
Total length:		15:00

== Music video ==
The Bloomin'! video is largely based on Alice in Wonderland and features Tommy dressed in the signature blue dress following a white rabbit into the worm-hole. The video also features cheerleaders similar to those in the videos for the previous two singles: "Everyday at the Bus Stop" and "Kiss One More Time".
