= Tsumetai Hana =

1998 single by the Brilliant Green

Single by the Brilliant Green

from the album The Brilliant Green
- B-side: "Baby London Star"
- Released: August 26, 1998; October 1, 2000 (reissue)
- Recorded: 1998
- Genre: J-pop
- Length: 13:51
- Label: Sony Music Records; Defstar Records (reissue)
- Songwriter(s): Tomoko Kawase; Shunsaku Okuda
- Producer(s): The Brilliant Green

The Brilliant Green singles chronology
"There Will Be Love There (Ai no Aru Basho)" (1998)	"Tsumetai Hana" (1998)	"Sono Speed De" (1999)

Music video
- "Tsumetai Hana" on YouTube

"Tsumetai Hana" (Japanese: 冷たい花, lit. 'Cold Flowers') is the Brilliant Green's fourth single, released on August 26, 1998, by Sony Music Records, and reissued on October 1, 2000, by Defstar Records. It peaked at #1 on the Oricon Singles Chart, and was the band's second #1 single. It was used as the opening theme for Count Down TV.

The song also appears on the band's compilation albums, Complete Single Collection '97–'08 (2008) and The Swingin' Sixties (2014).

== Track listing ==
All lyrics are written by Tomoko Kawase, all songs arranged by the Brilliant Green

No.	Title	Music	Length
1.	"Tsumetai Hana" (冷たい花, Cold Flower)	Shunsaku Okuda	4:38
2.	"Baby London Star"	Ryo Matsui	4:35
3.	"Tsumetai Hana" (Backing track)	Shunsaku Okuda	4:38
Total length:			13:51
