= Tommy Airline =

Studio album by Tommy february^{6}
- Released: 17 March 2004
- Recorded: 2002–2003
- Genre: Synthpop; techno
- Length: 49:42
- Language: Japanese; English
- Label: Defstar
- Producer: Tomoko Kawase; Malibu Convertible

Tommy february^{6} chronology
| Tommy February^{6} (2002) | Tommy Airline (2004) | Strawberry Cream Soda Pop Daydream (2009) |

Singles from Tommy Airline
- 1. "je t'aime ★ je t'aime" Released: 6 February 2003; 2. "Love is Forever" Released: 16 July 2003; 3. "Magic in Your Eyes" Released: 11 February 2004

Tommy Airline (stylized as "✈Tommy airline") is the second solo album released by vocalist Tomoko Kawase under the alter-ego Tommy february^{6}. The album heavily features 80's inspired dance themes. The album was also released as a limited edition CD and DVD package, including music videos and karaoke videos. Sanrio characters Kiki and Lala from Little Twin Stars make a brief appearance on the album cover, portraying as flight attendants, they also appear in the music video for the song "Magic in Your Eyes". The album is certified platinum by the Recording Industry Association of Japan (RIAJ).

== Critical reception ==
A professional review from Ian Martin at AllMusic describes the album as, "the sheer, shameless, '80s hero worship of it all. Where many '80s-influenced pop acts seem hung up on the hipster style aspect, Tommy February 6, aka Kawase Tomoko of drab guitar rockers the Brilliant Green, makes no concessions to fashion and turns the whole process into a huge be-costumed slumber party." Additionally, Ian states that, "Tommy Airline still stands as a gloriously cheap, trashy celebration of bubblegum pop at its finest -- not only the finest work of Kawase's career, but also one of the best Japanese pop albums of the decade."

Professional ratings
| Review Scores | Rating |
|---|---|
| AllMusic | 4.5/5 |

== Track listing ==
All lyrics are written by Tommy february^{6}; all music is composed by Malibu Convertible

CD
| No. | Title | Length |
|---|---|---|
| 1. | "AttenTion pLEasE" | 0:25 |
| 2. | "je t'aime ★ je t'aime" | 4:53 |
| 3. | "Sepia Memory" | 4:52 |
| 4. | "Futari no Seaside (ふたりのシーサイド; Our seaside)" | 4:59 |
| 5. | "Candy Eyes Dolls ','" | 3:38 |
| 6. | "Choose Me or Die" | 3:26 |
| 7. | "Dancin' Baby" | 4:18 |
| 8. | "Sweet Dream" | 4:11 |
| 9. | "The Rose Fragrance" | 3:19 |
| 10. | "Magic in Your Eyes" | 5:35 |
| 11. | "I Still Love You Boy" | 5:18 |
| 12. | "Love is Forever" | 4:48 |
| Total length: | | 49:42 |

== Personnel ==
- Tommy february^{6} - executive producer ("Total Produced & Organized by...")
- Malibu Convertible - producer, arranger, recording engineer, mixing engineer
- Tomohiro Murata - additional recording & mixing engineer on tracks 3, 6, 7 & 8
- Takashi Yoshiba - additional recording & mixing engineer on tracks 5 & 9

Mix assisted by Hiroya Takayama / Keizo Mogi and Naoya Tokunou
