= I Can't Breathe (disambiguation) =

"I can't breathe" is a slogan associated with the killing of Eric Garner, as well as with broader issues of police brutality and racial inequality in the United States.

I Can't Breathe may also refer to:

== Literature ==
- I Can't Breathe: A Killing on Bay Street, a 2017 book by Matt Taibbi about the killing of Eric Garner

== Music ==
- "I Can't Breathe" (H.E.R. song), 2020
- "I Can't Breathe" (Jerome Farah song), 2020
- "I Can't Breathe", a song from 24Hours's 2013 album, Party People
- "I Can't Breathe", a song from Aminata Savadogo's 2015 album, Inner Voice
- "I Can't Breathe", a song from Audiovent's 2002 album, Dirty Sexy Knights in Paris
- "I Can't Breathe", a song from Bea Miller's 2017 EP, Chapter One: Blue
- "I Can't Breathe", a song from Bruce Kulick's 2003 album, Transformer
- "I Can't Breathe", a song from Cold as Life's 2000 album, Declination of Independence
- "I Can't Breathe", a song from Dead by April's 2017 album, Worlds Collide
- "I Can't Breathe", a song from Edgewater's 2006 album, We're Not Robots...
- "I Can't Breathe", a song from Gary Numan's 2004 album, Hope Bleeds
- "I Can't Breathe", a song from GWSN's 2021 EP The Other Side of The Moon
- "I Can't Breathe", a song from Jang Wooyoung's 2017 album, It Is Still...
- "I Can't Breathe", a song from Krypteria's 2007 album, Bloodangel's Cry
- "I Can't Breathe", a song about Garner's death from Kxng Crooked's 2014 album, Sex, Money and Hip-Hop
- "I Can't Breathe", a song from Masc's 2016 album, Strange
- "I Can't Breathe", a song from the New Seekers's 2009 album, It's Been Too Long – Greatest Hits and More
- "I Can't Breathe", a song from Parker McCollum's 2017 album, Probably Wrong
- "I Can't Breathe", a 2015 song and video by Pussy Riot
- "I Can't Breathe", a song from Skrape's 2004 album, Up the Dose
- "I Can't Breathe", a song from Stitched Up Heart's 2016 album, Never Alone
- "I Can't Breathe", a song from Tickle Me Pink's 2007 album, Madeline
- "I Can't Breathe", a song from Trust Company's 2008 compilation album, Unreleased
- "I Can't Breathe", a song from Tyler Woods's 2009 album, The R&B Sensation
- "I Can't Breathe", a song from Vampires Everywhere!'s 2012 album, Hellbound and Heartless

== Television ==
- "I Can't Breathe", a 1949 episode of the TV series Actors Studio
- "I Can't Breathe", a 2011 episode of the TV series Hoarding: Buried Alive
- "I Can't Breathe", a 2001 episode of the TV series True Life

== See also ==
- Can't Breathe (disambiguation)
- Choke (disambiguation)
- Suffocation (disambiguation)
- "I Just Can't Breathe...", a 2010 song by the Brilliant Green
- Dad, I Can't Breathe, a 1995 album by the Boils
- "I Can't Breathe Anymore", song by David Gilmour from his 1978 album David Gilmour
