= Love Is Forever (Tomoko Kawase song) =

Single by Tommy february^{6}

from the album Tommy Airline
- Released: July 16, 2003
- Recorded: 2003
- Genre: Pop
- Length: 19:00
- Label: Defstar Records
- Songwriter(s): Tomoko Kawase
- Producer(s): Malibu Convertible

Tommy february^{6} singles chronology
"Je t'aime je t'aime" (2003)	"Love Is Forever" (2003)	"Magic in Your Eyes" (2004)

"Love Is Forever" is Tomoko Kawase's fifth single released as Tommy February^{6}, and the second single for her second studio album, "Tommy Airline". The single was released July 16, 2003, and peaked at number six in Japan and stayed on the charts for seven weeks. The single was released the same day as Tommy heavenly^{6}'s debut single "Wait till I Can Dream". It was also used as an insert song in episode 5 of the anime Paradise Kiss.

== Track listing ==
All music is composed by Malibu Convertible

No.	Title	Writer(s)	Length
1.	"Love is forever"	Tomoko Kawase	4:49
2.	"Futari no Seaside" (ふたりのシーサイド)	Tomoko Kawase	4:49
3.	"Summer Lemonade Poem"	Tomoko Kawase	2:09
4.	"Love Is Forever" (Instrumental Version)	Tomoko Kawase	4:47
Total length:			19:00
