= Bye Bye Mr. Mug =

Single by the Brilliant Green
- B-side: "Sunny Mood Shirt" "Love Baby" "Green Wood Diary"
- Released: September 21, 1997; October 1, 2000 (reissue)
- Genre: J-pop
- Length: 16:45
- Label: Sony Music Records; Defstar Records (reissue)
- Songwriter(s): Tomoko Kawase, Shunsaku Okuda
- Producer(s): The Brilliant Green

The Brilliant Green singles chronology
"Bye Bye Mr. Mug" (1997)	"Goodbye and Good Luck" (1997)

Audio
- "Bye Bye Mr. Mug" on YouTube

"Bye Bye Mr. Mug" is the debut single by Japanese rock band the Brilliant Green. It was released by Sony Music Records on September 21, 1997, and reissued by Defstar Records on October 1, 2000. It peaked at #69 on the Oricon Singles Chart. Saru Shibai, a Japanese television drama that aired on Fuji Television in 1998, features "Bye Bye Mr. Mug" as the ending theme.

The song also appears on the band's compilation albums Complete Single Collection '97–'08 (2008) and The Swingin' Sixties (2014).

== Track listing ==
All lyrics are written by Tomoko Kawase; all songs arranged by the Brilliant Green.

No.	Title	Music	Length
1.	"Bye Bye Mr. Mug"	Shunsaku Okuda	4:29
2.	"Sunny Mood Shirt"	Ryo Matsui	3:05
3.	"Love Baby"	Shunsaku Okuda	4:36
4.	"Green Wood Diary"	Shunsaku Okuda	4:35
Total length:			16:45
