= Ash Like Snow =

2008 single by the Brilliant Green

Single by the Brilliant Green

from the album Complete Single Collection '97–'08
- B-side: "Goodbye and Good Luck" (Piano Arrange Version)
- Released: February 6, 2008
- Genre: Rock
- Length: 13:21
- Label: Defstar Records
- Songwriters: Tomoko Kawase, Shunsaku Okuda

The Brilliant Green singles chronology
"Enemy" (2007)	"Ash Like Snow" (2008)	"Like Yesterday" (2010)

Music video
- "Ash Like Snow" on YouTube

"Ash Like Snow" is the 17th single from the Japanese rock band the Brilliant Green, released on February 6, 2008. It peaked at #8 on the Oricon Singles Chart.

This song serves as the second opening theme for the Japanese anime, Mobile Suit Gundam 00. The first press contains a Gundam 00 sticker, which differs between limited edition and regular edition, along with Allelujah Haptism's character ID card. The song's music video also made several references to Gundam 00 such as the appearance of Lockon's Haro and Tomoko dressed as Wang Liu Mei. The song was released coincidentally with the band's singer's birthday.

Currently it has sold 50,868 copies in Japan according to the year end Oricon Chart of 2008.

It was later covered by Bish for the album Mobile Suit Gundam 40th Anniversary Album: Beyond.

== Track listing ==
All lyrics are written by Tomoko Kawase; all music is composed by Shunsaku Okuda.

No.	Title	Length
1.	"Ash Like Snow"	4:32
2.	"Goodbye and Good Luck" (Piano Arrange Version)	4:19
3.	"Ash Like Snow" (Instrumental Version)	4:30
Total length:		13:21

== Personnel ==
- Tomoko Kawase – vocals
- Ryo Matsui – lead guitar, drums
- Shunsaku Okuda – rhythm guitar, bass
