= I Just Can't Breathe... =

2010 single by the Brilliant Green

Single by the Brilliant Green

from the album Blackout
- B-side: "It Really Makes My Day!" "Tsumetai Hana" (Acoustic Version)
- Released: August 18, 2010
- Recorded: 2010
- Genre: J-pop
- Length: 13:27
- Label: Warner Music Japan
- Songwriters: Tomoko Kawase, Shunsaku Okuda
- Producer: Shunsaku Okuda

The Brilliant Green singles chronology
"Blue Daisy" (2010)	"I Just Can't Breathe..." (2010)

Music video
- "I Just Can't Breathe..." on YouTube

"I Just Can't Breathe..." is the Brilliant Green's twentieth single, released on August 18, 2010. It peaked at #33 on the Oricon Singles Chart.

== Track listing ==
All lyrics are written by Tomoko Kawase; all music is composed by Shunsaku Okuda.

No.	Title	Length
1.	"I Just Can't Breathe..."	5:08
2.	"It Really Makes My Day!"	3:57
3.	"Tsumetai Hana" (Acoustic Version)	4:22
Total length:		13:27
