= Can't Breathe (disambiguation) =

"Can't Breathe" is a 2010 song by Fefe Dobson.

Can't Breathe may also refer to:

- Can't Breathe, a 2000 album by Boiler Room, and its title track
- "Can't Breathe", a song by Cyndi Lauper from her 2008 album Bring Ya to the Brink
- "Can't Breathe", a song by Disciple from their 2001 album By God
- "Can't Breathe", a song by The Herd from their 2005 album The Sun Never Sets
- "Can't Breathe", a song by Leona Lewis from her 2009 album Echo
- "Can't Breathe", a song by Southern Sons from their 1992 album Nothing but the Truth
- "Can't Breathe", a song by Tanya Stephens from her 2004 album Gangsta Blues
- "Can't Breathe", a song by U-KISS from their 2013 album Collage

== See also ==
- I Can't Breathe (disambiguation)
- Can't Breathe Without You (disambiguation)
- "I Just Can't Breathe...", a 2010 song by the Brilliant Green
- "Can't Breathe Anymore", a song by TNT from their 2004 album XIII
- "I Can't Breathe Anymore", a song by David Gilmour from his 1978 album David Gilmour
- Dad, I Can't Breathe, a 1995 album by The Boils
