= There Will Be Love There (Ai no Aru Basho) =

1998 single by the Brilliant Green

Single by the Brilliant Green

from the album The Brilliant Green
- B-side: "You & I"
- Released: May 13, 1998; October 1, 2000 (reissue)
- Recorded: 1998
- Genre: J-pop
- Length: 8:24
- Label: Sony Music Records; Defstar Records (reissue)
- Songwriters: Tomoko Kawase; Shunsaku Okuda
- Producers: The Brilliant Green, Masanori Sasaji

The Brilliant Green singles chronology
"Goodbye and Good Luck" (1997)	"There Will Be Love There (Ai no Aru Basho)" (1998)	"Tsumetai Hana" (1998)

Music video
- "There Will Be Love There (Ai no Aru Basho)" on YouTube

"There Will Be Love There (Ai no Aru Basho)" (Japanese: There Will Be Love There -愛のある場所-, lit. 'There Will Be Love There (Place with Love)') is the Brilliant Green's third single, released on May 13, 1998, by Sony Music Records, and reissued on October 1, 2000, by Defstar Records. It peaked at #1 on the Oricon Singles Chart, and was the band's first #1 single. It was used as the theme song for the 1998 TV drama Love Again, and as the ending theme for the 2016 anime series ReLIFE's Episode 9.

The song also appears on the band's compilation albums, Complete Single Collection '97–'08 (2008) and The Swingin' Sixties (2014).

Glim Spanky covered the song on the February 17, 2018, episode of the BS-TBS TV show Sound Inn "S", a recording of which was included on certain editions of their May 9, 2018, single "All of Us".

== Track listing ==
All lyrics are written by Tomoko Kawase; all music is composed by Shunsaku Okuda, arranged by the Brilliant Green & Masanori Sasaji.

No.	Title	Length
1.	"There Will Be Love There (Ai no Aru Basho)" (There Will Be Love There -愛のある場所-, There Will Be Love There (Place with Love))	4:03
2.	"You & I"	4:21
Total length:		8:24
