= Heavy Starry Heavenly =

Studio album by Tommy heavenly^{6}
- Released: March 7, 2007
- Recorded: 2006–2007
- Genre: Pop punk; post-grunge
- Label: Defstar Records
- Producer: Lucy Henson, Chris Walker, Mark & John, Brian Valentine, Jeffrey Stevens

Tommy heavenly^{6} chronology
Tommy Heavenly^{6} (2005)	Heavy Starry Heavenly (2007)	Gothic Melting Ice Cream's Darkness Nightmare (2009)

Limited Edition DVD

Singles from Heavy Starry Heavenly
- 1. "I'm Gonna Scream+" Released: June 7, 2006; 2. "Pray" Released: July 5, 2006; 3. "Lollipop Candy Bad Girl" Released: October 11, 2006; 4. "I Love Xmas" Released: December 6, 2006; 5. "Heavy Starry Chain" Released: February 7, 2007

Heavy Starry Heavenly is the second album by the Brilliant Green vocalist Tomoko Kawase under her pseudonym Tommy heavenly6.

== Overview ==
"Heavy Starry Heavenly" is Tommy Heavenly6's second studio album, released two years after Tommy Heavenly6. (As stated on the cover) it is billed as "the "dramatic" new album" featuring "12 cute new songs". Following the release of "Tommy heavenly6", Kawase released a continuous string of singles starting with I'm Gonna Scream+ and finally ending a single-productive phase with Heavy Starry Chain. Each single in between "Tommy heavenly6" and "Heavy Starry Heavenly" was included on the album (as well as their B-side tracks).

The initial Limited Edition pressing includes a bonus promotional DVD, including music videos and "making of" videos.

== Track listing ==
All lyrics are written by Tomoko Kawase; all music is composed by Chiffon Brownie

CD
No.	Title	Length
1.	"Heavy Starry Chain"
2.	"Stay away from me"
3.	"I'm Gonna Scream+"
4.	"My Bloody-Knee-High-Socks"
5.	"Door Mat"
6.	"Lollipop Candy Bad Girl (Album Version)"
7.	"The Case"
8.	"About U"
9.	"I Love Xmas"
10.	"Pray"
11.	"Going 2 My Way!"
12.	"Lucky Me"
Total length:		39:00

DVD
No.	Title	Length
1.	"I'm Gonna Scream+ (Music Video)"
2.	"Pray (Music Video)"
3.	"Heavy Starry Chain (Music Video)"
4.	"Lollipop Candy Bad Girl (Music Video)"
5.	"I Love Xmas (Music Video)"
6.	"+Gothic Pink+ (Music Video)"
7.	""Making of" Videos"

== Heavy Starry Tour '07 ==
After the release of the album, Kawase started on her "Tommy heavenly6 Heavy Starry Tour '07" in order to promote the album. The tour consisted of four live shows in four cities around Japan, taking place in March 2007. The shows took place in Fukuoka, Aichi, Osaka and finally ending in Tokyo. On certain legs of the tour, her bandmates from The Brilliant Green appeared as guest musicians. The songs played were from both "Heavy Starry Heavenly" and "Tommy heavenly6".

=== Tour setlist ===
1. Wait Till I Can Dream
2. Stay Away from Me
3. I'm Gonna Scream+
4. Door Mat
5. 2Bfree
6. My Bloody-Knee-High-Socks
7. +Gothic Pink+
8. Lollipop Candy Bad Girl (Album Version)
9. Gimme All of Your Love!!
10. LCDD
11. Roller Coaster Ride
12. Pray
13. Heavy Starry Chain
14. Ready? (encore)
15. Hey My Friend (encore)
16. Lucky Me (encore)
