= The Winter Album =

The Winter Album may refer to:

- The Winter Album (NSYNC album)
- The Winter Album (The Brilliant Green album)

== See also ==
- Winter (disambiguation)#Albums
