= Live / Magic =

Single by AMOYAMO

from the album Flash
- Released: March 27, 2013
- Genre: Pop rock
- Label: Defstar Records

AMOYAMO singles chronology
"Let's Go Out" (2012)	"Live / Magic" (2013)

"Live / Magic" is the second single released by Japanese pop duo AMOYAMO. The single is a double a-side single featuring the songs "Live" and "Magic", and was released March 27, 2013. The song peaked at #26 on the Oricon singles chart, and charted for two weeks.

== Track listing ==
No.	Title	Length
1.	"Live"	3:19
2.	"Magic"	4:11
3.	"Maze"	5:26
4.	"Darlin'"	3:41

Little Twin Stars Edition Bonus Track
No.	Title	Length
5.	"Twinkle"	3:57
