= Flash (Amoyamo album) =

Studio album by AMOYAMO
- Released: October 30, 2013 (Japan)
- Language: Japanese, English
- Label: DefSTAR Records
- Producer: Tomoko Kawase

AMOYAMO chronology
AMOYAMO (2012)	Flash (2013)

Singles from Flash
- 1. "Let's Go Out" Released: October 31, 2012; 2. "Live / Magic" Released: March 27, 2013

Flash is the only studio album by Japanese pop duo Amoyamo. The album peaked at #30 on the Oricon albums chart.

== Track listing ==
CD
No.	Title	Length
1.	"Flash"
2.	"Let's Go Out"
3.	"Magic"
4.	"Twinkle"
5.	"Into the Groove"
6.	"Freeze!"
7.	"X □ Boyfriend"
8.	"SeCret scARlet"
9.	"Moonshine Boy"

DVD
No.	Title	Length
1.	"Flash"
2.	"Let's Go Out"
3.	"Live"
4.	"Heart □□ Candy"
5.	"Off Shot Movie"

== Personnel ==
- Amo – Vocals
- Ayamo – Vocals
- Tomoko Kawase – Production, Lyrics
