= Everyday at the Bus Stop =

Single by Tommy february6

from the album Tommy february6
- Released: 25 July 2001
- Recorded: 2001
- Genre: J-pop
- Label: Defstar Records
- Songwriter(s): Tomoko Kawase

Tommy february6 singles chronology
"Everyday at the Bus Stop" (2001)	"Kiss One More Time" (2001)

"Everyday at the Bus Stop" is Tomoko Kawase's first single under Tommy February^{6}, name that is associated with her birthday (February 6), and the first single that was done independent of The Brilliant Green. Some editions come with a promotional DVD. The song peaked at #12 on Oricon charts and stayed on the charts for 12 weeks.

== Track listing ==
1. Everyday at the Bus Stop
2. Walk Away from You My Babe
3. Since Yesterday
4. Everyday at the Bus Stop (Captain Funk "Daydream" Edition)

== DVD Track listing ==
1. Everyday at the Bus Stop PV
2. Everyday at the Bus Stop (Choreographic Version)
3. Everyday at the Bus Stop (Karaoke Version)
4. Everyday at the Bus Stop (TV Spot)
5. Making of Everyday at the Bus Stop
