= Heavy Starry Chain =

Single by Tommy heavenly^{6}

from the album Heavy Starry Heavenly
- B-side: "Always Somethin' New"
- Released: February 7, 2007
- Genre: Rock
- Length: 12:00
- Label: Defstar Records
- Songwriters: Tomoko Kawase, John White

Tommy heavenly^{6} singles chronology
"I Love Xmas" (2006)	"Heavy Starry Chain" (2007)	"Papermoon" (2008)

CD+DVD version

"Heavy Starry Chain" is the only single released from Tomoko Kawase's alter-ego, Tommy heavenly^{6} in 2007. It was followed up by her second album Heavy Starry Heavenly. This is Tommy heavenly^{6}'s 8th single, and Kawase's 16th overall. The single peaked at #20 on the Oricon singles chart. The limited-edition version includes a DVD with the Heavy Starry Chain promotional video.

== Music video ==
The music video features Tommy heavenly^{6} and her band in a setting that resembles a cooking show. Kawase is dressed as Snow White, with the rest of the band dressed as magicians. At some points in the video the setting is a birthday party, where Kawase is dressed accordingly.

== Track listing ==
All lyrics are written by Tomoko Kawase, all music composed and arranged by John White.

Disc 1: CD
No.	Title	Length
1.	"Heavy Starry Chain"	3:54
2.	"Always Somethin' New"	3:37
3.	"Heavy Starry Chain" (Instrumental)	3:52

Disc 2: DVD
No.	Title	Length
1.	"Heavy Starry Chain" (music video)
