= Blue Daisy (song) =

2010 single by the Brilliant Green

Single by the Brilliant Green

from the album Blackout
- B-side: "All Day and All of the Night" "Blue Sunrise"
- Released: June 30, 2010
- Recorded: 2010
- Genre: J-pop
- Length: 11:41
- Label: Warner Music Japan
- Songwriters: Tomoko Kawase, Shunsaku Okuda
- Producer: Shunsaku Okuda

The Brilliant Green singles chronology
"Like Yesterday" (2010)	"Blue Daisy" (2010)	"I Just Can't Breathe..." (2010)

"Blue Daisy" is the Brilliant Green's nineteenth single, released on June 30, 2010. It peaked at #20 on the Oricon Singles Chart.

== Track listing ==
All lyrics are written by Tomoko Kawase; all music is composed by Shunsaku Okuda.

No.	Title	Length
1.	"Blue Daisy"	5:53
2.	"All Day and All of the Night" (The Kinks cover)	2:30
3.	"Blue Sunrise"	3:18
Total length:		11:41
