= Call My Name =

Call My Name may refer to:

- Call My Name (album), by Etta James, 1967
- Call My Name (EP), by Got7, 2019
- "Call My Name" (Orchestral Manoeuvres in the Dark song), 1991
- "Call My Name" (Prince song), 2004
- "Call My Name" (Charlotte Church song), 2005
- "Call My Name" (Third Day song), 2008
- "Call My Name" (Pietro Lombardi song), 2011
- "Call My Name" (Cheryl song), 2012
- "Call My Name" (AverySunshine song), 2014
- "Call My Name" (The Brilliant Green song), 1999
- "Call My Name" (Tove Styrke song), 2011
- "Call My Name", single and album by James Royal, 1967 and 1969
- "Call My Name", a song by Them from Them Again, 1966
- "Call My Name", a song by Night Ranger from Dawn Patrol, 1982
- "Call My Name", a song by Michael Bolton from Everybody's Crazy, 1985
- "Call My Name", a song by Sammy Hagar from The Essential Red Collection, 2004
- "Call My Name", a song by Sultan & Ned Shepard (featuring Nadia Ali), 2011
- "Call My Name", a song by Jars of Clay from The Shelter, 2010
- "Call My Name", a song by Smile featuring Robyn, 2021
- "Call My Name", a song by Collar, 2022
- "Call My Name", a song by Alle Farben, 2025
