= I'm So Sorry (disambiguation) =

"I'm So Sorry" is a 2015 song by Imagine Dragons.

I'm So Sorry may also refer to:

- "I'm So Sorry", a song by Aldous Harding from Party, 2017
- "I'm So Sorry", a song by Carroll Thompson, 1981
- "I'm So Sorry", a song by EC2, written and produced by Mick Ronson, 1990
- "I'm So Sorry", a song by Herreys from Crazy People, 1985
- "I'm So Sorry", a song by José, 1981
- "I'm So Sorry", a song by Mary Wells from Bye Bye Baby I Don't Want to Take a Chance 1961

== See also ==
- "So. Central Rain (I'm Sorry)", a song by R.E.M., 1984
- "I'm So Sorry Baby", a song by the Brilliant Green, 2002
