= Leaving You =

Leaving You may refer to:

- "Leaving You", song by Savoy (group)
- "Leaving You", song by Tommy Heavenly from I Kill My Heart
