= Hey My Friend =

Single by Tommy heavenly^{6}

from the album Tommy heavenly^{6}
- Released: May 26, 2004
- Genre: Rock
- Length: 11:50
- Label: Defstar Records
- Songwriter(s): Mark and John

Tommy heavenly^{6} singles chronology
"Wait till I Can Dream" (2003)	"Hey My Friend" (2004)	"Ready?" (2005)

"Hey My Friend" is Tomoko Kawase's second single under Tommy Heavenly^{6}, and the eight overall single from her solo career. Hey My Friend and Roller Coaster Ride were both themes for the movie Shimotsuma Monogatari. The song peaked at #20 in Japan and stayed on the charts for 9 weeks. The Hey My Friend single sold a total of 39,000 units.

== Track listing ==
1. Hey My Friend
2. Roller Coaster Ride
3. Hey My Friend (Original Instrumental)
