= Magic in Your Eyes =

Magic in Your Eyes may refer to:

- "Magic in Your Eyes" (song), a 2004 song by Tomoko Kawase under the name Tommy february6
- Magic in Your Eyes (album), a 1978 album by Earl Klugh
