= Lollipop Candy Bad Girl =

Single by Tommy heavenly^{6}

from the album Heavy Starry Heavenly
- Released: October 11, 2006
- Genre: Rock
- Label: DefSTAR Records
- Songwriter(s): Tomoko Kawase, Chiffon Brownie

Tommy heavenly^{6} singles chronology
"Pray" (2005)	"Lollipop Candy Bad Girl" (2006)	"I Love Xmas" (2006)

"Lollipop Candy Bad Girl" is Tomoko Kawase's sixth single under Tommy heavenly^{6}, and the fourteenth overall single from her solo career. It was released October 11, 2006 in celebration of Halloween, and peaked at #12 on the Oricon singles chart.

== Track listing ==
1. "Lollipop Candy Bad Girl"
2. "Lollipop Candy Bad Girl" (Short Version)
3. "Lollipop Candy Bad Girl" (Original Karaoke)

== DVD Track listing ==
1. "Lollipop Candy Bad Girl" (PV)
2. "Lollipop Candy Bad Girl" (short version) (PV)

== Chart performance ==
Chart performance for "Lollipop Candy Bad Girl"
Chart (2006)	Peak position
Japan (Oricon)	12
