= Amoyamo =

Former Japanese pop-duo

- Origin: Tokyo, Japan
- Genres: Synthpop; power pop
- Years active: 2012 – 2014
- Labels: Tower Records; DefStar Records
- Past members: Amo (vocals); Ayamo (vocals)

Amoyamo, stylized as AMOYAMO, was a Japanese pop-duo made up of female models Amo and Ayamo.

== History ==
=== Formation and debut ===
In 2012, Harajuku models Amo and Ayamo were put together by DefStar Records to perform as a singing duo under the name Amoyamo. Their group name was a combination of both of their first names. The label enlisted former label-mate Tomoko Kawase to act as the girls' mentor and producer. Kawase had been a long-time musical inspiration for Amo and Ayamo. They released a pre-debut EP, Amoyamo, in August 2012 to gain publicity for the group.

The group's debut single, "Let's Go Out", was released on October 31, 2012. The song was used as the twelfth opening song for the anime television Gin Tama. The single included a cover of "Pray" by Tommy heavenly^{6}, which was the original Gin Tama opening. "Let's Go Out" debuted at number 23 on the Oricon singles chart.

=== Flash ===
In 2013, the duo parted ways with mentor/producer Tomoko Kawase. Their next single "Live / Magic", a double a-side, was released March 27, 2013. The group announced their first studio album, Flash, to be released October 30, 2013.

=== End of duo ===
On March 14, 2014, the official website announced that Amoyamo would no longer be working together.

== Discography ==
=== Albums ===
- Flash (2013)

=== EPs ===
- Amoyamo (2012) (indies)

=== Singles ===
- "Let's Go Out" (2012)
- "Live / Magic" (2013)

=== Digital singles ===
- "Twinkle" (2013)
- "Flash" (2013)

== Bibliography ==
- "Circus" (2011)
- "Amoscream (Bijin Kaika mini Series)" (2013)
- "Amo Calendar 2014" (2013)
- "LARME012 LIMITED EDITION AMO × HIROMIX PHOTO BOOKLET" (2014)
- "AYAMO" (2014)
- "GET UP GIRLY for neo girly girls DIRECTED by AMO" (2014)

== Videography ==
- "Chugakusei Universal Sukoyaka" - Momochi Mochi role (2012)
