= Blue daisy =

Blue daisy may refer to:

== Plant species ==
- Felicia amelloides, also known as "blue marguerite"
- Cichorium intybus, more commonly called "chicory"

== Other ==
- "Blue Daisy" (song), a 2010 song by the Japanese rock band The Brilliant Green
- Blue Daisy (musician), British electronic musician
