= Ruby shoes =

Ruby shoes may refer to:

- Ruby slippers, the shoes worn by Dorothy Gale (played by Judy Garland) in the movie The Wizard of Oz
- "Ruby Shoes", a song from the B-side of Papermoon (song)
