= Magic in Your Eyes (song) =

Single by Tommy february^{6}

from the album Tommy Airline
- B-side: "I Still Love You Boy"
- Released: February 11, 2004
- Recorded: 2004
- Genre: Pop
- Length: 22:00
- Label: Defstar Records
- Songwriter(s): Tomoko Kawase
- Producer(s): Malibu Convertible

Tommy february^{6} singles chronology
"Love Is Forever" (2003)	"Magic in Your Eyes" (2004)	"Lovely: Yume Miru Lovely Boy" (2004)

"Magic in Your Eyes" is the sixth single released by Tomoko Kawase under the name Tommy February^{6}. "Magic in Your Eyes" is the theme song for the Japanese drama: Okusama wa Majo - Bewitched in Tokyo. It was released on February 11, 2004. It peaked at number six on the Oricon singles chart and is certified gold in Japan. The cover artwork features Tommy February^{6}'s mascots, Little Twin Stars.

== Track listing ==
All lyrics are written by Tomoko Kawase; all music is composed by Malibu Convertible

CD
No.	Title	Length
1.	"Magic in Your Eyes"	5:35
2.	"I Still Love You Boy"	5:19
3.	"Magic in Your Eyes (Instrumental)"	5:34
4.	"I Still Love You Boy (Instrumental)"	5:17
Total length:		22:00
