= Live Magic (disambiguation) =

Live Magic is Queen's 1986 live compilation album.

Live Magic may refer to:

- "Live / Magic", a 2013 single by Japanese pop duo AMOYAMO

== See also ==
- Love magic or love charm
