= Swinging Sixties (disambiguation) =

The Swinging Sixties is the 1960s decade of fashion in London.

Swinging Sixties may also refer to:

- "Swinging Sixties", art gallery show leading to the prosecution of Robert Fraser (art dealer) in 1966
- Swinging Sixties Productions, producers of "It Only Hurts When I Cry" by Donna Loren
- The Swingin' Sixties (EMI compilation album) 2008
- The Swingin' Sixties, compilation album of Japanese songs by The Brilliant Green, 2014
