= Wait till I Can Dream =

Single by Tommy heavenly^{6}

from the album Tommy heavenly^{6}
- Released: July 16, 2003
- Recorded: 2002–03
- Genre: Rock
- Length: N/A
- Label: Defstar Records
- Songwriter(s): Shunsaku Okuda
- Producer(s): Jonathan Curtis

Tommy heavenly^{6} singles chronology
"Wait till I Can Dream" (2003)	"Hey My Friend" (2004)

"Wait Till I Can Dream" is a song by Tomoko Kawase, released as the first single under Tommy Heavenly^{6}. It was released at the same time as Tommy February^{6}'s single, "Love is Forever". The song peaked at #5 in Japan's Oricon Singles Chart and stayed on the charts for 8 weeks.

== Music video ==
In the beginning of the music video, we see Tommy February^{6} taking off her glasses and donning a much more alternative look to become Tommy heavenly^{6}.

== Track listing ==
1. Wait 'till I Can Dream
2. Swear
3. Melancholy Power ++

== DVD Track Listing ==
1. Wait 'till I Can Dream (PV)
2. Swear (PV)
3. Wait 'till I Can Dream (PV) (Karaoke)
4. Swear (PV) (Karaoke)
