= Hirakawachi Itchōme =

Japanese musical group

- Origin: Japan
- Genres: Folk, pop
- Years active: 2003 - 2008
- Labels: DefStar, Sony Music Japan
- Members: Ryūnosuke Hayashi; Naojirō Hayashi
- Website: www.hirakawachi.com

Hirakawachi Itchōme (Japanese: 平川地一丁目) is a former Japanese folk music group consisting of brothers Ryūnosuke Hayashi (born April 14, 1988) and Naojirō Hayashi (born December 23, 1990). Their name is more often romanized as Hirakawachi 1-chome. Their name is actually a reference to where they were originally from in Shizuoka Prefecture, and references the Japanese addressing system. 1-chome is like "first district".

== Background ==
Growing up on Sado Island, the brothers' musical influence came from their father who taught them to play guitar. Ryūnosuke, the oldest, began copying folk songs from the 1970s and 1980s and then began writing his own and asked his younger brother, Naojirō, to join him. They began playing locally at music events and festivals (hence the name Hirakawachi Itchōme which is the district they lived in growing up) and eventually participated in a New Year countdown event in Sado, gaining them invitations to perform from all over Japan.

In 2002 they entered an audition held by a major music company and were selected as one of five finalists from 37,000 applicants, winning the right to make a professional debut. Their professional debut occurred in November 2003 when they released their first CD single, Tokyo. Their debut album Enpitsu de tsukuru uta (song written in pencil) was released on July 28, 2004 and reached the 7th spot on the Oricon Chart making it the youngest j-pop male artists' album charted in the top 10.

They have released a total of 13 singles and 4 studio albums, as well as Utaite wo Kaete, a collection of singles and B-sides, and Hirakawachi Itchōme II - Mo Hitotsu no Best Album to Last Live, a compilation of greatest hits and live tracks. Their final single was "Tokyo", a new recording of their debut single.

== Lemon no koro ==
In 2007, Naojirō Hayashi made his acting debut in the film "Lemon no koro" (Time of Lemon), known outside Japan as "The Graduates". He also performed a song "Hikari" (Light) for the soundtrack, which was released as a single. It was his only release as a solo performer.

== Disbandment ==
In 2008 it was announced that the group intended to disband, citing a desire to pursue academics. Tokyograph News also provided the following explanation, both for the formation of the group, and their eventual dissolution: "Originally from the island of Sadogashima in the Niigata Prefecture, the pair made their debut as middle schoolers in 2003. At the time, they weren't really aspiring for musical fame. Ryunosuke revealed that they have three other siblings, though their mother had run away from home with their youngest brother. By starting Hirakawachi Itchōme, the duo had hoped to find their mother and brother. They recalled that playing their music had been sad and painful at first, but with the support of their fans they eventually grew to enjoy it. As of now, their family has been reunited." In light of the above, the choice to call themselves Hirakawachi 1-chome may have been a further effort to gain their mother's attention, via their media exposure, as her whereabouts were unknown at that time. In fact, the impetus for their reunion was their mother noticing them on television.

== Discography ==
=== Albums ===
Album info
Nanatsu no Hiragana (七つのひらがな)

Release date: 2003.03.05

Enpitsu de Tsukuru uta (えんぴつで作る歌)

Release date: 2004.07.28

Umikaze wa Toki o Koete (海風は時を越えて)

Release date: 2005.07.27

Utaite o Kaete (歌い手を代えて)

Release date: 2006.09.20

Yukidoke no Koro ni Todoku Tegami (雪解けの頃に届く手紙)

Release date: 2007.02.28

Hirakawachi Itchōme II - Mō Hitotsu no Best Album to Last Live (平川地一丁目II～もうひとつのベストアルバムとラストライヴ～)

Release date: 2008.11.26

=== Singles ===
Single info
Tokyo (とうきょう)

Release date: 2003.11.6

Sakura no Kakusu Wakaremichi (桜の隠す別れ道)

Release date: 2004.2.18

Kimi no Bun Made (君の分まで)

Release date: 2004.6.2

Kitto Santa ga (きっとサンタが)

Release date: 2004.12.8

Hagareta Yoru (はがれた夜)

Release date: 2005.3.16

Jūroku Dome no Natsu (十六度目の夏)

Release date: 2005.6.29

Yumemiru Jump ~Minna no Uta Ver.~ (夢見るジャンプ～みんなのうたVer.～)

Release date: 2005.11.9

Yume no Tochū/Kōtei ni Mitsuketa Haru (夢の途中/校庭に見つけた春)

Release date: 2006.3.24

Unmei no Mukō (運命の向こう)

Release date: 2006.5.24

Eien no Yakusoku (永遠の約束)

Release date: 2007.2.14

Yamiyo ni Umarete (闇世に生まれて)

Release date: 2007.10.10

Utakata (うたかた)

Release date: 2008.3.26

Tokyo (とうきょう)

Release date: 2008.7.30
