= Fushigi Yamada =

Japanese voice actress

- 山田 ふしぎ
- Born: Kyoko Yamada (山田 恭子); November 11, 1959 (age 66); Tokyo, Japan
- Education: Tokyo University of Science
- Occupation: Voice actress
- Years active: 1980–present
- Agent: 81 Produce
- Website: Official profile

Kyoko Yamada (山田 恭子, Yamada Kyōko; born November 11, 1959 in Tokyo), better known by her stage name Fushigi Yamada (山田 ふしぎ, Yamada Fushigi) is a Japanese voice actress affiliated with 81 Produce. Yamada is a graduate of Tokyo University of Science.

== Filmography ==
=== As Kyoko Yamada ===
- Bikkuriman (Dossuke)
- Doraemon (Yamada-kun)
- Doraemon (Jaiko Gōda (Substitute voice))
- Doraemon: Nobita's Diary on the Creation of the World (Emodoran, Suneko)
- Dragon Quest: The Adventure of Dai (Miina)
- Mahou Tsukai Sally 2 (Poppy)
- Ginga: Nagareboshi Gin (Mother)
- Mobile Fighter G Gundam (Hoy)
- Sailor Moon R (Kirin (ep.67))
- Transformers Masterforce (Browning, Parrot)
- Ultraman USA (Andy)
- Ultraman Kids: 30 Million Light Years Looking for Mama
- Little Women II: Jo's Boys (Demi)
- Yawara! A Fashionable Judo Girl (Kurokawa)

=== As Fushigi Yamada ===
- Asobou! Hello Kitty (Pekkle)
- Denji Sentai Megaranger vs. Carranger (Picoto)
- Kiteretsu Daihyakka (Mamekoro (Second voice))
- Magic Knight Rayearth 2 (Child A (ep.40-41))
- Pocket Monsters Advanced Generation the Movie - Sky-Splitting Visitor: Deoxys (Masato)
- Pocket Monsters Advanced Generation the Movie - Wishing Star of the Seven Nights: Jirachi (Masato)
- Pocket Monsters: Advanced Generation (Masato)
- Pocket Monsters Advanced Generation the Movie - Pokémon Ranger and the Prince of the Sea: Manaphy (Masato)
- Pocket Monsters Advanced Generation the Movie - Mew and the Wave Hero: Lucario (Masato)
- Pokémon: The Mastermind of Mirage Pokémon (Masato)
- s-CRY-ed (Akira Terada)
- Saru Get You -On Air- (Piposaru, Pipotron Yellow)
