= Ready? =

Single by Tommy heavenly^{6}

from the album Tommy heavenly^{6}
- Released: July 20, 2005
- Genre: Rock
- Label: Defstar Records

Tommy heavenly^{6} singles chronology
"Hey My Friend" (2004)	"Ready?" (2005)	"I'm Gonna Scream+" (2006)

"Ready?" is Tomoko Kawase's third single as Tommy heavenly^{6}. It was released on Jul 20, 2005, and peaked at #15 on the Oricon singles chart. It was her last single released for her debut album Tommy heavenly^{6}.

== Track listing ==
No.	Title	Writer(s)	Producer(s)	Length
1.	"Ready?"	Tomoko Kawase	Chris Walker	2:52
2.	"Gimme All of Your Love !!"	Tomoko Kawase	Mark and John	3:25
3.	"Ready?" (Original Instrumental)		Chris Walker	2:51
