= I Kill My Heart =

Studio album by Tommy heavenly^{6}
- Released: April 29, 2009
- Recorded: 2009
- Genre: Pop punk; post-grunge
- Length: 38:22
- Label: DefSTAR Records
- Producer: Chiffon Brownie

Tommy heavenly^{6} chronology
Gothic Melting Ice Cream's Darkness Nightmare (2009)	I Kill My Heart (2009)	February & Heavenly (2012)

I Kill My Heart is the third studio album by Tommy heavenly^{6}. It was released on April 29, 2009, and was Kawase's final album with DefSTAR Records. "I Kill My Heart" is a concept album in which Tommy heavenly^{6} uses a less energetic and darker sound than on previous albums, and each track was played by the same backing band.

== Track listing ==
All lyrics are written by Tomoko Kawase; all music is composed by Chiffon Brownie

CD
No.	Title	Length
1.	"Wait for Me There"	3:30
2.	"Leaving You"	3:55
3.	"Do You Know My Heart?"	3:27
4.	"Sad End to a Fairy Tale"	4:17
5.	"Shut Up"	2:36
6.	"Flower Crown"	4:00
7.	"Surely"	3:40
8.	"Gonna Change My Way of Life"	2:39
9.	"Playground"	2:33
10.	"Things I Can Do"	3:45
11.	"You Should Live in the Sunny Light"	3:55
Total length:		39:00

DVD
No.	Title	Length
1.	"Wait for Me There"	3:30
2.	"Wait for Me There (february^{6} Version)"	3:30
3.	"Leaving You"	3:55
4.	"Leaving You (february^{6} Version)"	3:55
Total length:		15:00

== Music videos ==
Influences from Alice in Wonderland and 1970's glam rock are shown in the "Wait for me There" video.

Although no singles were released for the album, two music videos were released for I Kill My Heart: "Wait for Me There", and "Leaving You". Two versions of each video were released: one featuring Tommy heavenly^{6} and one featuring Tommy february^{6}. All four of the videos used the same set and similar themes, although the February^{6} versions feature a more upbeat attitude. The "Wait for Me There" video uses a tea party setting inspired by Alice in Wonderland, as well as a "pumpkin graveyard" and fashion runway. The "Leaving You" video is inspired by the androgyny of 1970's Glam Rock.

== Reception ==
Professional ratings
Review scores
Source	Rating
Allmusicis	link

"I Kill My Heart" received mixed reviews from critics. Adam Greenberg of Allmusic stated "The songs aren't landmarks of grunge writing by any measure, but within the context of normally bubbly Japanese pop (including the happier alter ego Tommy february^{6}), an album like "I Kill My Heart" holds secrets that haven't been spread into the territory before". The album reached number 9 on the Oricon charts in the first week of its release.

== Personnel ==
- Tomoko Kawase – Vocals
- Chiffon Brownie – Guitar
- Satoshi 'Anthony' Yamada – Bass
- Yasuo Sano – Drums

Notes

- Credits adapted from album's liner notes.
