= Tommy Heavenly6 =

Tommy Heavenly^{6}

Studio album by Tommy heavenly^{6}
- Released: August 24, 2005
- Recorded: 2003–2005
- Genre: Pop punk; post-grunge
- Length: 39:09
- Label: Defstar Records
- Producer: Lucy Henson, Chris Walker, Mark & John, Brian Valentine, and Jeffrey Stevens

Tommy heavenly^{6} chronology
Tommy Heavenly^{6} (2005)	Heavy Starry Heavenly (2007)

Limited Edition Cover

Singles from Tommy heavenly^{6}
- 1. "Wait till I Can Dream" Released: July 16, 2003; 2. "Hey My Friend" Released: May 26, 2004; 3. "Ready?" Released: July 20, 2005

Tommy Heavenly^{6} is Japanese artist Tomoko Kawase's third solo studio album and debut studio album under her pseudonym Tommy heavenly^{6}. The album was released August 24, 2005 through DefStar Records. Tommy heavenly^{6} peaked at #4 on the Oricon albums chart and is certified Gold by the Recording Industry Association of Japan.

== Release and promotion ==
Kawase debuted the Tommy Heavenly^{6} character after a televised performance by Tommy february^{6} where she performed tracks from the album's lead single, "Wait till I Can Dream". The single was then released on July 16, 2003. The album's second single "Hey My Friend" was released one year later on May 26, 2004. The single's A-side was used as the closing theme, and B-side used as the opening theme, for the film version of Kamikaze Girls. The album's final single, "Ready?", was released July 20, 2005.

Kawase appeared on the cover of volume 50 of Marquee magazine to promote the album.

After over two years since the album's debut single, the album was finally released on August 24, 2005. The album was released in both standard and limited editions. The limited edition pressing came with a bonus promotional DVD, including music videos and "making of" videos.

== Track listing ==
All lyrics are written by Tomoko Kawase.

CD
No.	Title	Music	Arranger(s)	Length
1.	"2Bfree"	Lucy Henson	Lucy Henson, Chris Walker	3:47
2.	"Ready?"	Chris Walker	Chris Walker	2:52
3.	"Wait Till I Can Dream"	Mark and John	Mark and John	3:39
4.	"Fell in Love with You"	Mark and John	Mark and John	3:22
5.	"Wanna Be Your Idol"	Lucy Henson	Lucy Henson, Chris Walker	2:42
6.	"+Gothic Pink+"	Lucy Henson	Lucy Henson, Chris Walker	3:26
7.	"Swear"	Mark and John	Mark and John	3:52
8.	"Lost My Pieces"	Lucy Henson	Lucy Henson, Chris Walker	3:48
9.	"Gimme All of Your Love!!"	Jeffery Stevens	Jeffery Stevens	3:25
10.	"LCDD"	Jeffery Stevens	Jeffery Stevens	3:51
11.	"Hey My Friend"	Mark and John	Mark and John	4:28
Total length:				40:00

Limited Edition DVD
No.	Title	Length
1.	"Wait Till I Can Dream"
2.	"Hey My Friend"
3.	"Ready?"
4.	"Making of: Wait Till I Can Dream"
5.	"Making of: Swear"
6.	"Making of: Hey My Friend"
7.	"Making of: Ready?"

Notes

- The acronym "LCDD" stands for "Like a Candy Day-Dream".
