= I Love Xmas =

Single by Tommy heavenly^{6}

from the album Heavy Starry Heavenly
- B-side: "The Case"
- Released: December 6, 2006
- Genre: Rock
- Length: 11:00
- Label: DefSTAR Records
- Songwriter(s): Tomoko Kawase

Tommy heavenly^{6} singles chronology
"Lollipop Candy Bad Girl" (2006)	"I Love Xmas" (2006)	"Heavy Starry Chain" (2007)

CD+DVD version

"I Love Xmas" (stylized as "I ♥ XMAS") is the 7th single released from Tomoko Kawase's alter-ego, Tommy heavenly^{6}, and the 15th overall single from her solo career. It was released on December 6, 2006, and peaked at No. 29 on the Oricon singles chart. "I Love Xmas" appropriately enough has a Christmas theme surrounding the lyrics as well as the music video.

== Music video ==
The music video features Tomoko Kawase as Tommy heavenly^{6} and Tommy February^{6} in similar outfits, singing next to Santa Claus, as well as riding a giant panda. The video has a Christmas theme, and also features scenes from previous music videos.

== Track listing ==
1. I Love Xmas
2. The Case
3. I Love Xmas (Instrumental)

== DVD Track listing ==
1. I Love Xmas (PV)
