= Suffocation (disambiguation) =

Suffocation is the process of asphyxia.

Suffocation, Suffocate, or Suffocating may also refer to:

- Suffocation (band), an American death metal band
  - Suffocation (album), 2006
- "Suffocation", a song on Morbid Angel's debut album, Altars of Madness
- "Suffocation", a song on Obituary's debut album Slowly We Rot
- "Suffocation", a song on Vangelis's album See You Later
- "Suffocate", a song by Finger Eleven from their 2000 album The Greyest of Blue Skies
- "Suffocate", a song by Cold from their 2003 album Year of the Spider
- "Suffocate", a song by Green Day from their 2002 album Shenanigans
- "Suffocate" (Feeder song), a 1998 single by Feeder
- "Suffocate" (J. Holiday song), a 2007 single by J. Holiday
- "Suffocate", a song by Mutiny Within from Mutiny Within
- "Suffocate" (King Adora song), 2001
- Suffocate (Knocked Loose song), 2024
- "Suffocate", a song by Crossfade from their 2011 album We All Bleed
- "Suffocate", a song by Exo from their 2026 album Reverxe
- "Suffocating", a song by Lost Society from their 2022 album If the Sky Came Down
