= Pray (Tomoko Kawase song) =

Single by Tommy heavenly^{6}

from the album Heavy Starry Heavenly
- Released: July 5, 2006
- Genre: Rock
- Length: 17:00
- Label: DefSTAR Records
- Songwriter(s): Tomoko Kawase

Tommy heavenly^{6} singles chronology
"I'm Gonna Scream+" (2005)	"Pray" (2006)	"Lollipop Candy Bad Girl" (2006)

"Pray" is the third single released by Tomoko Kawase under the name Tommy heavenly^{6}, and the second single released for the Heavy Starry Heavenly album. Two versions were offered, included a version with an alternative cover, stickers, and DVD. "Pray" was used as the first opening for the Gintama anime series. "Pray" peaked at #10 on the Oricon singles chart.

== Track listing ==
All lyrics are written by Tomoko Kawase; all music is composed by Chiffon Brownie

CD
No.	Title	Length
1.	"Pray"	4:32
2.	"About U"	3:17
3.	"Lost My Pieces (Melancholic Guitar Version)"	4:29
4.	"Pray (Instrumental)"	4:22
Total length:		21:00

DVD
No.	Title	Length
1.	"Pray (Music Video)"	4:32
Total length:		4:32

== Music video ==
A music video was released for Pray featuring Tomoko Kawase as a samurai.

== Merchandise ==
In July 2011, Tomoko Kawase released various memorabilia items on her official site inspired by the Pray music video through Lightvan Company, including a kimono style robe and plush toy.
