= Can't Breathe Without You =

Can't Breathe Without You may refer to:

- "Can't Breathe Without You", a 2005 song by Marc Terenzi
- "Can't Breathe Without You", a song by SpeXial from their 2014 album Break It Down
