= Kiss One More Time =

"Kiss One More Time" is a song by Tomoko Kawase, released as her second single under Tommy February^{6}, on November 21, 2001. The song peaked at number 20 in Japan's Oricon Singles Chart and stayed on the charts for 10 weeks.

This work contains a sound frequency to control AIBO, and when the song is played in front of AIBO, AIBO receives it and dances to the song. (The album version does not have this trick.)

This song was also covered by indie electro-rock duo "Midnight Brown".

== Track listing ==
1. Kiss One More Time
2. Tommy Feb Latte, Macaron. (トミーフェブラッテ、マカロン。)
3. Candy Pop in Love
4. Kiss One More Time (Sunaga't Experience's Euro/Set Remix)
