= Los Angeles (The Brilliant Green album) =

Studio album by The Brilliant Green
- Released: January 1, 2001
- Genre: Alternative rock; power pop
- Label: DefStar Records

The Brilliant Green chronology
Terra 2001 (1999)	Los Angeles (2001)	The Winter Album (2002)

Professional ratings
Review scores
Source	Rating
AllMusic	4/5 stars

Los Angeles is the third album by Japanese rock band The Brilliant Green, released in 2001. This album represented a shift in the band's sound, from the 1960s-influenced jangle pop to a darker, heavier early 1990s shoegaze sound. When The Brilliant Green was featured on Time Magazine's "Ten Best Bands On Planet Earth" article, it was Los Angeles that was listed as their key album.

== Track listing ==
All lyrics are written by Tomoko Kawase; all music is composed by Shunsaku Okuda except where noted, all songs arranged by The Brilliant Green

No.	Title	Music	Length
1.	"The Lucky Star ☆☆☆"		4:17
2.	"Yeah I Want You Baby"		2:31
3.	"Angel Song -Eve no Kane- (-イヴの鐘-; -Bell of the eve-)" (11th single)		4:19
4.	"Sayonara Summer Is Over (サヨナラ summer is over; Good-bye, summer is over)"		4:07
5.	"Hidoi Ame (ヒドイ雨; a heavy rain)"	Ryo Matsui	4:45
6.	"☆Falling Star in Your Eyes"		3:21
7.	"It's Up to You!"	Ryo Matsui	2:30
8.	"Kuroi Tsubasa (黒い翼; Black wings)" (b-side of 11th single)		3:09
9.	"Los Angeles" (instrumental)	Shunsaku Okuda, Ryo Matsui	2:05
10.	"Hello Another Way -Sorezore no Basho- (-それぞれの場所-; -Our own places-) (Album Mix)" (different version of 10th single)		5:31
11.	"I Can Hold Your Hand Baby"		4:27
