= Blackout (The Brilliant Green album) =

Studio album by The Brilliant Green
- Released: September 9, 2010
- Genres: Alternative rock; power pop
- Label: Warner Music Japan

The Brilliant Green chronology
The Winter Album (2002)	Blackout (2010)	The Swingin' Sixties (2014)

Blackout is an album released by The Brilliant Green on September 9, 2010. The album is the band's fifth studio album and their first studio album released under Warner Music Japan. It peaked at #16 on the Oricon weekly albums chart.

== Track listing ==
All lyrics are written by Tomoko Kawase; all music is composed by Shunsaku Okuda except #10 by Damon Albarn, arranged by Shunsaku Okuda.

No.	Title	Length
1.	"Blackout"	4:27
2.	"Black Dark Night"	3:56
3.	"I'm Sick of This Place"	3:49
4.	"Talk to Me"	3:25
5.	"Blue Daisy" (19th single)	5:51
6.	"Break Free"	4:36
7.	"Going Underground"	4:43
8.	"Whirlwind"	4:27
9.	"Spring Gate" (B-side of 18th single)	2:03
10.	"Song 2" (Blur Cover)	5:07
11.	"I Just Can't Breathe..." (20th single)	4:28
12.	"Like Yesterday" (18th single)	3:16
13.	"Blue Sunrise" (B-side of 19th single)	4:39
Total length:		54:47

== Charts ==
Chart (2010)	Peak position
Japan Oricon Daily Albums	12
Japan Oricon Weekly Albums	16
