= The Brilliant Green (album) =

Studio album by The Brilliant Green
- Released: September 19, 1998
- Genre: Alternative rock; power pop
- Label: SMEJ
- Producer: The Brilliant Green, Masanori Sasaji

The Brilliant Green chronology
The Brilliant Green (1998)	Terra 2001 (1999)

The Brilliant Green is the self-titled first album by the band of the same name. It was originally released on September 19, 1998, and reissued in 2004. The album spent 21 weeks in the Oricon album charts, peaking at number 2.

== Track listing ==
All lyrics are written by Tomoko Kawase; all music is composed by Shunsaku Okuda except where noted.

CD
No.	Title	Music	Arranger(s)	Length
1.	"I'm in Heaven"	Ryo Matsui	The Brilliant Green	4:43
2.	"Tsumetai Hana (冷たい花; cold flower)" (4th single)		The Brilliant Green	4:36
3.	"You & I" (B-side of 3rd single)		The Brilliant Green & Masanori Sasaji	4:20
4.	"Always and Always"		The Brilliant Green	2:41
5.	"Stand By"		The Brilliant Green	4:05
6.	"Magic Place"		The Brilliant Green & Masanori Sasaji	3:55
7.	"I"		The Brilliant Green & Masanori Sasaji	3:51
8.	"Baby London Star" (B side of 4th single)		The Brilliant Green	4:36
9.	"There Will Be Love There -Ai no Aru Basho- (There will be love there -愛のある場所-)" (3rd single)		The Brilliant Green & Masanori Sasaji	3:59
10.	"Rock'n Roll"		The Brilliant Green	3:43
Total length:				40:29
