= The Winter Album (The Brilliant Green album) =

Studio album by The Brilliant Green
- Released: 2002
- Genre: Alternative rock; power pop
- Label: DefStar Records

The Brilliant Green chronology
| Los Angeles (2001) | The Winter Album (2002) | Blackout (2010) |

The Winter Album is the fourth album by The Brilliant Green before their five-year hiatus from 2002 to 2007.

The album is noted as being different from their previous albums as they experimented with electronic and synth beats.

== Track listing ==
All lyrics are written by Tomoko Kawase; all music is composed by Shunsaku Okuda except where noted, all songs arranged by The Brilliant Green

CD
| No. | Title | Music | Length |
|---|---|---|---|
| 1. | "Intro: The Winter Album" | | 1:04 |
| 2. | "Holidays!" | | 3:12 |
| 3. | "Flowers" | | 3:59 |
| 4. | "I'm So Sorry Baby (album mix)" (14th single) | | 4:49 |
| 5. | "Forever to Me: Owarinaki Kanashimi (〜終わりなき悲しみ〜; Endless Sorrow) (album mix)" (12th single) | | 5:04 |
| 6. | "That Boy Waits for Me" | Ryo Matsui | 4:37 |
| 7. | "The Night Has Pleasant Time" | | 3:21 |
| 8. | "Day After Day" | Ryo Matsui | 4:52 |
| 9. | "Rainy Days Never Stays (album mix)" (13th single) | | 3:52 |
| 10. | "I'm Jus' Lovin' You (album mix)" (B-side of 14th single) | | 3:30 |
| 11. | "Running So High" | | 3:28 |
| 12. | "Escape" | Ryo Matsui | 4:24 |
| Total length: | | | 46:18 |
