= Terra 2001 =

Studio album by The Brilliant Green
- Released: September 8, 1999
- Genre: Alternative rock; power pop
- Label: SMEJ
- Producer: The Brilliant Green

The Brilliant Green chronology
The Brilliant Green (1998)	Terra 2001 (1999)	Los Angeles (2001)

Professional ratings
Review scores
Source	Rating
Allmusic	3/5 stars

Terra 2001 is the second album of The Brilliant Green released on September 8, 1999.

== Track listing ==
All lyrics are written by Tomoko Kawase; all music is composed by Shunsaku Okuda except where noted, all songs arranged by The Brilliant Green except where noted.

CD
No.	Title	Music	Arranger(s)	Length
1.	"Bye! My Boy!" (9th single)			3:22
2.	"Aino ♥ Aino Hoshi (愛の♥愛の星; The star of love ♥ love)" (7th single)			3:49
3.	"Brownie the Cat -Miwaku no Neko Room (魅惑の猫ルーム; Charming cat room)-"			3:58
4.	"Call My Name (English Version)" (English version of 8th single)			5:11
5.	"Maybe We Could Go Back to Then (76 Version)" (The different version of B-side of 6th single)			4:02
6.	"September Rain"	Ryo Matsui		4:22
7.	"Funny Girlfriend!!" (B-side of 7th single)			2:32
8.	"Round and Round"	Ryo Matsui	Strings arrangement: Takahiro Itoh	4:27
9.	"Sono Speed De (そのスピードで; At that speed)" (5th single)			5:08
10.	"Can't Stop Cryin'"			3:42
11.	"Nagai Tameiki no Youni (長いため息のように; Like a long sigh)" (6th single)			5:37
Total length:				46:10
