= Complete Single Collection '97–'08 =

Complete Singles Collection '97-'08
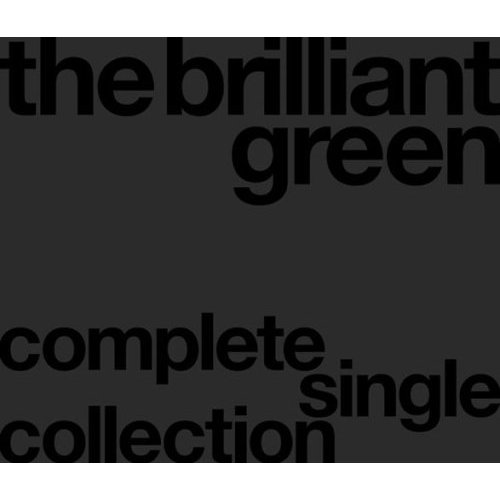

Compilation album by The Brilliant Green
- Released: February 20, 2008
- Genre: Alternative rock; power pop
- Label: DefSTAR

The Brilliant Green chronology
The Winter Album (2002)	Complete Singles Collection '97-'08 (2008)

The Complete Singles Collection '97–'08 is a compilation album released by The Brilliant Green on February 20, 2008. It collects all of the group's previous singles.

== Track listing ==
1. "Bye Bye Mr.Mug"
2. "Goodbye and Good Luck"
3. "There Will Be Love There -Ai no Aru Basho-"
4. "Tsumetai Hana"
5. "Sono Speed de"
6. "Nagai Tameiki no Youni"
7. "Ai no Ai no Hoshi"
8. "Call My Name (Japanese Version)"
9. "Bye! My Boy!"
10. "Hello Another Way -Sorezore no Basho-"
11. "Angel Song -Eve no Kane-"
12. "Forever To Me ~Owarinaki Kanashimi~"
13. "Rainy Days Never Stays"
14. "I'm So Sorry Baby"
15. "Stand by Me"
16. "Enemy"
17. "Ash Like Snow"

== Chart positions ==
- Oricon (Japan): #1
- Billboard (Japan): #2
