= The Brilliant Green =

Japanese band

- Also known as: BuriGuri
- Origin: Kyoto, Japan
- Genres: Alternative rock; power pop
- Years active: 1995–2002, 2007–present
- Labels: Sony Music Records (1997–2000); Defstar Records (2000–2009); Warner Music Japan (2010–present)
- Members: Tomoko Kawase; Shunsaku Okuda; James MacWhyte; J.J. De Barrado
- Past members: Ryo Matsui
- Website: thebrilliantgreen.info

The Brilliant Green (Japanese: ザ・ブリリアント・グリーン, Hepburn: Za Buririanto Gurīn) is a Japanese rock band from Kyoto formed in 1995. They were signed to Sony Music Records. Their major debut single under Sony, "Bye Bye Mr. Mug", was released in 1997. Their contract with Sony ended in 2008, and on December 1, 2009, the band announced that it had signed with Warner Music Japan.

== Overview ==
The Brilliant Green takes much of their influence from Western music, most predominantly the Beatles, with over half their songs including English lyrics. Their break came in 1998 when their third single, "There Will Be Love There", was chosen as the theme song for the popular Japanese TV drama series Love Again and, as a result, went straight to the top of the charts. After another number one hit with "Tsumetai Hana" they released their self-titled debut album which sold over one million copies in just two days. On the back of this success their first national tour, titled "There Will Be Live There", sold out across Japan in only three minutes.

In 2001, Time magazine chose the Brilliant Green as one of the top ten contemporary acts outside the U.S. for their Los Angeles album. In 2001, Tomoko Kawase started a solo project under the name Tommy February6.

After the release of The Winter Album in 2002, the band members moved on to solo projects, but the group never officially broke up. Kawase continued as a solo artist under the names Tommy February6 and Tommy Heavenly6. Matsui also started a new project called Meister. On November 22, 2003, Kawase and Okuda announced their marriage.

On June 1, 2007, it was announced that after five years of inactivity, the Brilliant Green would be returning with a new single to celebrate their 10th anniversary. The song, titled "Stand by Me", was selected as the ending theme for the new series of TV drama, Detective School Q, which began on July 3, 2007. The comeback began in earnest on August 22, 2007, as the new single hit the stores.

The band appeared in their first proper live show since their comeback by playing at the Iwafune Mountain Cliff Stage on October 21, 2007. This performance was part of the "Iwafune Cliff Stage Special 2007" with the Brilliant Green appearing alongside other musical acts including DxD, Sowelu, and Viagrade.

The second single release of their comeback, "Enemy", was released on December 12, 2007. The following single, titled "Ash Like Snow", appears as an opening theme in the anime series, Mobile Suit Gundam 00. On February 20, 2008, a compilation album titled Complete Single Collection '97–'08 was released. The band also mentioned in an interview that a new studio album was currently in the works, consisting of previously unrecorded songs that were written over the previous ten years.

Following the release of their compilation album in February 2008, the group's 18th single, "Like Yesterday", was released on February 2, 2010. It featured a rearrangement of a previous single, "Sono Speed De", that was re-written in English, titled "At Light Speed". It was their first single since 2008's "Ash Like Snow" and was their second-lowest selling single since 2007's "Enemy".

On May 5, 2010, it was announced that guitarist and original member Ryo Matsui had left the Brilliant Green. His reasons for leaving were not stated, but Kawase and Okuda continued the group as a duo.

The Brilliant Green's fifth album, Blackout, was released on September 15, 2010.

The Brilliant Green's sixth album, The Swingin' Sixties, was released on July 23, 2014.

== Members ==
=== Current members ===
- Tomoko Kawase – vocals (1995–present)
- Shunsaku Okuda – lead guitar (2010–present), bass (1995–2010), rhythm guitar (1995–present)
- James MacWhyte – bass guitar (2010–present)
- James "J.J." De Barrado – drums (2010–present)

=== Former members ===
- Ryo Matsui – lead guitar, drums (1995–2010)

== Discography ==
- The Brilliant Green (1998)
- Terra 2001 (1999)
- Los Angeles (2001)
- The Winter Album (2002)
- Blackout (2010)
- The Swingin' Sixties (2014)

== See also ==
- Tomoko Kawase, for her solo career as "Tommy February6" and "Tommy Heavenly6" during the Brilliant Green's hiatus.
