= Tomoko Kawase =

Japanese musicians (born 1975)

- 川瀬 智子
- Born: February 6, 1975 (age 51); Kyoto, Japan
- Other names: Tommy february6; Tommy heavenly6
- Occupations: Singer; songwriter; producer; actress; model
- Years active: 1995–present
- Agents: Ken-On (1995–2009); Ninety-One Inc. (2009–present)
- Spouse: Shunsaku Okuda (m. 2003)
- Musical career
- Genres: Alternative rock; power pop; synthpop; pop punk; post-grunge; techno
- Instruments: Vocals; guitar
- Labels: DefSTAR Records, Warner Music Japan, House of TMY Records (UMJ)

Tomoko Kawase (川瀬 智子, Kawase Tomoko; born February 6, 1975) is a Japanese singer, songwriter, producer, actress, and model from Kyoto. She is the lead singer of the alternative rock band The Brilliant Green. She also has a solo career under the alter-ego pseudonyms Tommy february6 and Tommy heavenly6.

== Biography ==
Her debut solo album Tommy February6 peaked at No. 1 on the Japan Oricon chart. The album was certified Platinum by the Recording Industry Association of Japan, as well as her second studio album Tommy Airline. She has released eight solo albums. Her songs appeared in various anime including Paradise Kiss, Mobile Suit Gundam 00, Soul Eater, Pokémon, Gin Tama, and Bakuman. Two of her songs were used in the 2004 film adaptation of Kamikaze Girls. From 2001 to 2009, she released music through Defstar Records, a division of Sony Music Japan. From 2010 to 2013 she released music through Warner Music Japan. From 2014 on she released music through her own label, House of TMY Records, a sub-division of Universal Music Japan.

She has appeared on the cover of Marquee magazine nine times, and has also been featured on the cover of JGM and NewsMaker. She modeled for Italian fashion house Fiorucci, and hosted the MTV Japan show Breakdown. She mentored and produced music for the pop-duo Amoyamo. In 2005, an official Blythe doll of Kawase was released.

She has been cited as an influence to other pop artists, such as Kyary Pamyu Pamyu and Charli XCX.

== Life and career ==
=== 1995–2001: The Brilliant Green ===
In 1995, after bassist Shunsaku Okuda and guitarist Ryo Matsui heard her sing in an amateur talent contest, Kawase was asked to join The Brilliant Green as the lead vocalist. The first two releases from The Brilliant Green were the non-album singles "Bye Bye Mr. Mug" and "Goodbye and Good Luck", which received moderate success. Their break came in 1998 when their third single, "There Will Be Love There" was chosen as the theme song for the popular Japanese drama Love Again, and as a result went straight to the top of the charts. After scoring another number one hit with "Tsumetai Hana", they released their self-titled debut album which sold over one million copies in just two days. On the back of this success their first national tour, titled "There Will Be Live There," sold out across Japan in only three minutes.

In 2013, Kawase started releasing music from all her personas in commemoration of the Brilliant Green's 15th anniversary.

=== 2001–2009: Tommy february6 / Tommy heavenly6 - Solo career under DefStar Records ===
In 2001, Kawase joined DefStar Records and launched her solo career under the character of Tommy february6 (named from a combination of her nickname and birth date) with "Everyday at the Bus Stop". Vastly different from the pop rock sound of The Brilliant Green, Tommy february6's persona and sound are inspired by and derived from British and American 1980's synthpop, including a cover of Strawberry Switchblade's "Since Yesterday". Kawase's original intention with Tommy february6 was to create a character who was far from innocent, though cute in both sound and appearance; Tommy february6 was designed to be someone who was true to her feelings despite the cutesy nature of her outward character and did as she wanted (and as such, Tommy february6 is seen repeatedly in music videos drinking alcohol from flasks, bars, etc.) Kawase's second single under the name was Kiss One More Time, and third single under the name was "Bloomin'!" (a song that was also used in a commercial for cosmetic company, Shiseido). Finally, on her birthday, Kawase released her eponymous debut album: Tommy february6.

In October 2002, Tommy february6 released a photo and journal book titled Tommy february6 + Hawaii. It is presented in a mock travel guide format, including features such as restaurant reviews, sightseeing hotspots and cultural information. In keeping with the character's outwardly cute personality, crude outline sketches of animals and fairies litter the pages (as seen on the cover) alongside thought bubbles gracing many of the pictures, which have the distinct appearance of doodles. One after the release of Tommy february6, Kawase released her fourth single under the name, titled "Je t'aime je t'aime". At this point, the original concept started to disappoint her and Kawase began to feel that the character could no longer maintain its purity. On the day she released her fifth single "Love Is Forever", she also released her debut single as Tommy heavenly6 "Wait Till I Can Dream". Kawase would later explain that Tommy heavenly6 was born from a dream that Tommy february6 had, in which she embraces all the elements of her personality she had previously been repressing.

In 2003, she created the pop group, Tommy Angels. The group only had one single, "You'll Be My Boy", which was released on December 17, 2003, and had a top chart position of No. 78 on the Oricon Top 200 Weekly Peak chart. Kawase wrote the lyrics for the song (with the music by Malibu Convertible), and also produced the track. The group disbanded after this single.

Shortly after this came the second studio album under the Tommy february6 name, titled: "Tommy Airline". After "Tommy Airline" came the release of Tommy heavenly6's second single "Hey My Friend", and the release of Tommy february6's single "Lovely: Yume Miru Lovely Boy", used as the ending song for the 7th Pokémon film. In August 2005 (nearly two years after her first single), Tommy heavenly6 finally released her third single, "Ready?", which was shortly followed by her own long-awaited eponymous debut album. After the release of Tommy february6's "Lonely in Gorgeous", Kawase decided to focus on the Tommy heavenly6 persona.

In 2006 and 2007 Tommy heavenly6 released five new singles which led to her second album Heavy Starry Heavenly. She finished this productive phase with the Heavy Starry Tour: four live performances as Tommy heavenly6 during March 2007. She incorporated most of her songs into this live format, which lasted for an hour and a half, complete with her now regular backing band, and even her bandmates from The Brilliant Green made guest appearances for some songs. Kawase still kept the Tommy february6 persona through cameos on Tommy heavenly6's music videos, like "Lollipop Candy Bad Girl" and "I Love Xmas".

In 2008 Tommy february6 was featured on a compilation album We Love Cyndi, covering "All Through the Night" by Cyndi Lauper. On February 25, 2009, Kawase released two best-of albums under both the Tommy aliases, Strawberry Cream Soda Pop Daydream (as February6) and Gothic Melting Ice Cream's Darkness Nightmare (as heavenly6). Both albums collected the Tommy singles and certain album tracks, as well as having a new track each.

In April 2009, Tommy heavenly6 released a new concept album, titled I Kill My Heart, which was composed mostly by Chiffon Brownie. Two of the promotional songs for her third album were accompanied by music videos that had two versions each: one as Tommy heavenly6 and one as Tommy february6. After the release of I Kill My Heart, both Tommy heavenly6 and Tommy february6's contracts with DefStar Records expired, and were not renewed.

=== 2010–2013: Warner Music Japan era ===
In 2010 Tommy february6, Tommy heavenly6, and The Brilliant Green were all picked up by Warner Music Japan. Finally in December 2010, Kawase announced via her Twitter page the possibility for a third studio album under the Tommy february6 persona. Tommy february6's official website with Warner Music Japan is still stated as "coming soon". In August 2011, Tommy stated via Twitter she was working on demos for both Tommy heavenly6 and Tommy february6. In September 2011, a statement was posted on Tommy heavenly6's official site saying Tommy february6 would return February 6, 2012. Tommy february6 was featured in Tommy heavenly6's music video for I'm Your Devil (Halloween Remix).

On November 11, 2011 Tommy announced during an interview with J-Wave Circus Circus she is in the process of recording a double album featuring both Tommy february6 and Tommy heavenly6, set for release in 2012. Warner released a press release on December 1, 2011, stating the album's release date as February 29, 2012. The album's title was later revealed to be "february & heavenly". The album debuted at No. 7 on the Oricon albums chart.

In September 2012, Tommy announced she would be releasing a Halloween EP titled "Halloween Addiction". Which would feature both of her previous "Halloween singles" as well as a new one. In December 2012, Tommy announced she would be releasing a special Valentine's Day single through Tommy february6 titled, "Be My Valentine". In April 2013, Tommy announced a new English single, "Runaway", and a new album, Tommy Candy Shop, for release in June 2013.

=== 2014–2024: House of TMY Records and Hiatus ===
In 2014 Kawase started her own sub-division of Universal Music Japan, House of TMY Records, through which she released her second solo EP, Tommy's Halloween Fairy Tale on October 14, 2015.

In 2017, Kawase returned with the promotional single "Kitty Ninja" from Tommy february6, along with a remixed version of "Living Dead Diner Girls" from Tommy heavenly6, available exclusively to members of her fan site. On October 17, 2018 Kawase released two new singles, "Ice Cream Devils" as Tommy heavenly6 and "Cupcake Angels" as Tommy february6.

Beginning January 1, 2023 Kawase went on an indefinite hiatus from releasing music and appearing publicly.

=== 2025-Present: Sony Music Entertainment Japan ===
In 2025 Kawase saw a resurgence in popularity after her song "Lonely in Gorgeous" went viral on TikTok. This prompted Sony Music Entertainment Japan (who owns Tommy's early catalogue after absorbing Defstar Records in 2014) to begin re-releasing Tommy's music. A remix competition for "Lonely in Gorgeous" was held on the global music creator platform SURF MUSIC starting June 13, 2025. The winning remix, "Lonely in Gorgeous -fourbeat Remix-", created by djfourbeat, was released digitally September 5th, 2025.

Tommy february6 and Tommy heavenly6 were re-released in vinyl format on July 16, 2025. Kawase attended a release party/pop-up shop for the albums, where she signed copies of the albums, marking her first public appearance since her hiatus.

In November of 2025 Sony hosted Tommy february6 The Screening 2025, a two location event where recordings of three of Kawase's past live events would be screened for an audience. Tommy february6's J-Wave Live 2000 concert, followed by Tommy heavenly6's Space Shower TV Live concert, then finally the brilliant green's Premium Acoustic Live concert. The first event was held November 8, 2025 at Japan Society in New York City, New York. The second event was held November 15, 2025 at the Cary Grant Theatre at Sony Pictures Studios in Los Angeles, California. Both of the dates were entirely sold out.

Starting February of 2026 a limited edition exclusive "Lonely in Gorgeous" collaboration game card was released at all US Round1 locations.

Tommy Airline and Heavy Starry Heavenly were re-released in vinyl format on April 1, 2026, after being postponed from their original planned re-release date of February 11, 2026.

In July 31, 2026 Kawase unexpectedly released a newly recorded song titled "LIVING DEAD DINER GIRLS -HALLOWEEN-" after 11 years of silence, credited by "Tommy Heavenly6, 奥田俊作".

== Personal life ==
Tomoko Kawase was born on February 6, 1975, in Kyoto, Japan. On November 22, 2003 Kawase announced her marriage to The Brilliant Green's fellow member and bassist, Shunsaku Okuda. Due to her marriage, her legal name changed to Tomoko Okuda. However, she is still credited as Kawase Tomoko.

== Discography ==
=== With The Brilliant Green ===
- The Brilliant Green (1998)
- Terra 2001 (1999)
- Los Angeles (2001)
- The Winter Album (2002)
- Blackout (2010)

=== As Tommy february6 ===
- Tommy February6 (2002)
- Tommy Airline (2004)
- February & Heavenly (2012)
- Tommy Candy Shop Sugar Me (2013)

=== As Tommy heavenly6 ===
- Tommy Heavenly6 (2005)
- Heavy Starry Heavenly (2007)
- I Kill My Heart (2009)
- February & Heavenly (2012)
- Tommy Ice Cream Heaven Forever (2013)

== Concert tours ==
=== With The Brilliant Green ===
- There Will Be Live There Tour (1998)
- Terra 2001 Tour (1999)

=== Solo tours ===
- Heavy Starry Tour (2007)

== Filmography ==
| Year | Title | Role | Network |
|---|---|---|---|
| – | Piropo | Voice of Pikki | – |
| – | Breakdown | Herself / Host | MTV |

== Bibliography ==
=== As Tommy february6 ===
- Tommy february6 + Hawaii (2002)

== Other activities ==
In October 2002, Tommy february6 released a photo and journal book titled Tommy february6 + Hawaii. It is presented in a mock travel guide format, including features such as restaurant reviews, sightseeing hotspots and cultural information. In keeping with the character's outwardly cute personality, crude outline sketches of animals and fairies litter the pages (as seen on the cover) alongside thought bubbles gracing many of the pictures, which have the distinct appearance of doodles.

Kawase has also made an appearance as the voice of Pikki in the anime series Piroppo, briefly modelled for Italian fashion house Fiorucci and for a period of time hosted Break Down, an MTV show. She also worked as a producer on the Takashi Fujii single, entitled "Oh My Juliet".

In October 2005, an exclusive Tommy February6 Blythe doll was released.

In 2012, she produced Japanese model duo, Amoyamo's pre-debut EP, "Amoyamo", as well as their debut single, "Let's Go Out!".
