= Shunsaku Okuda =

Japanese musician (born 1971)

- Born: July 11, 1971 (age 55); Kyoto, Japan
- Occupations: musician, producer
- Years active: 1995–present
- Known for: The Brilliant Green
- Spouse: Tomoko Kawase (m. 2003)

Japanese name
- Kanji: 奥田 俊作
Transcriptions
- Romanization: Okuda Shunsaku
- Website: thebrilliantgreen.info

Shunsaku Okuda (born July 11, 1971) is the leader of the Japanese rock/pop band The Brilliant Green where he plays bass guitar and rhythm guitar and has composed the vast majority of the band's music. He also produces music under the pseudonyms Chiffon Brownie, Malibu Convertible, and Mark & John.

== Personal life ==
On November 22, 2003 he married The Brilliant Green's lead singer, Tomoko Kawase.

== Discography ==
=== With The Brilliant Green ===
- The Brilliant Green (1998)
- Terra 2001 (1999)
- Los Angeles (2001)
- The Winter Album (2002)
- Blackout (2010)

=== Production credits ===
- Tommy february^{6} (2002)
- Tommy Airline (2004)
- OH MY JULIET! (2005)
- Tommy heavenly^{6} (2005)
- Heavy Starry Heavenly (2007)
- I Kill My Heart (2009)
- february & heavenly (2012)
- Tommy Candy Shop Sugar Me (2013)

== Concert tours ==
With The Brilliant Green

- There Will Be Love There Tour (1998)
- Terra 2001 Tour (1999)

Backing band

- Heavy Starry Tour (2007)
