= Defstar Records =

Japanese record label

Defstar Records, Inc.
- Parent company: Warner Music Japan (1997–2000); Sony Music Entertainment Japan (2000–2014)
- Founded: 1997 (as T Project); 2000 (as Defstar Records)
- Founder: Takashi Yoshida (吉田 敬, Yoshida Takashi)
- Defunct: 2015 (acquired by SME Records)
- Genre: Rock, pop
- Country of origin: Japan

Defstar Records, Inc. (株式会社デフスターレコーズ, Kabushiki-gaisha Defusutā Rekōzu; stylized as DefSTAR Records) was a Japanese record label, a subsidiary of Sony Music Japan.

== History ==
- 1997 – Takashi Yoshida, the president of Warner Music Japan, founded the label as T Project (Tプロジェクト, T Purojiekuto).
- 2000 – Yoshida transferred to Sony Music Entertainment Japan, and he brought the T Project catalog. He renamed it Defstar Records.
- 2001 – Defstar Records becomes a subsidiary of Sony Music Entertainment. Yoshida becomes its manager.
- 2003 – Yoshida returned to Warner Music Japan, but did not try to reclaim his label. Instead, he focused on restructuring his first company.
- 2014 - Defstar Records, Inc. is merged with the six other labels of Sony Music Japan to form Sony Music Labels Inc. and Defstar becomes one of labels of Sony Music Labels.
- 2015 - Defstar is absorbed into SME Records.

== Artists ==
Defstar Records' artists include: Amoyamo, Burnside Project, Chemistry, Mariko Gotō, Chiaki Kuriyama, Shion Tsuji, SawanoHiroyuki[nZk], Ken Hirai, GARNiDELiA, Hirakawachi 1-chome, Beat Crusaders, Kylee, Kanon Wakeshima, Tomoko Kawase, FLiP, universe, Long Shot Party, On/Off, Lil'B, Sowelu, Pe'zmoku, The Harris and Shiritsu Ebisu Chugaku. AKB48 used to release products under Defstar, before moving to King Records
