= Saki (musician) =

Japanese musician (born 1990)

Saki サキ
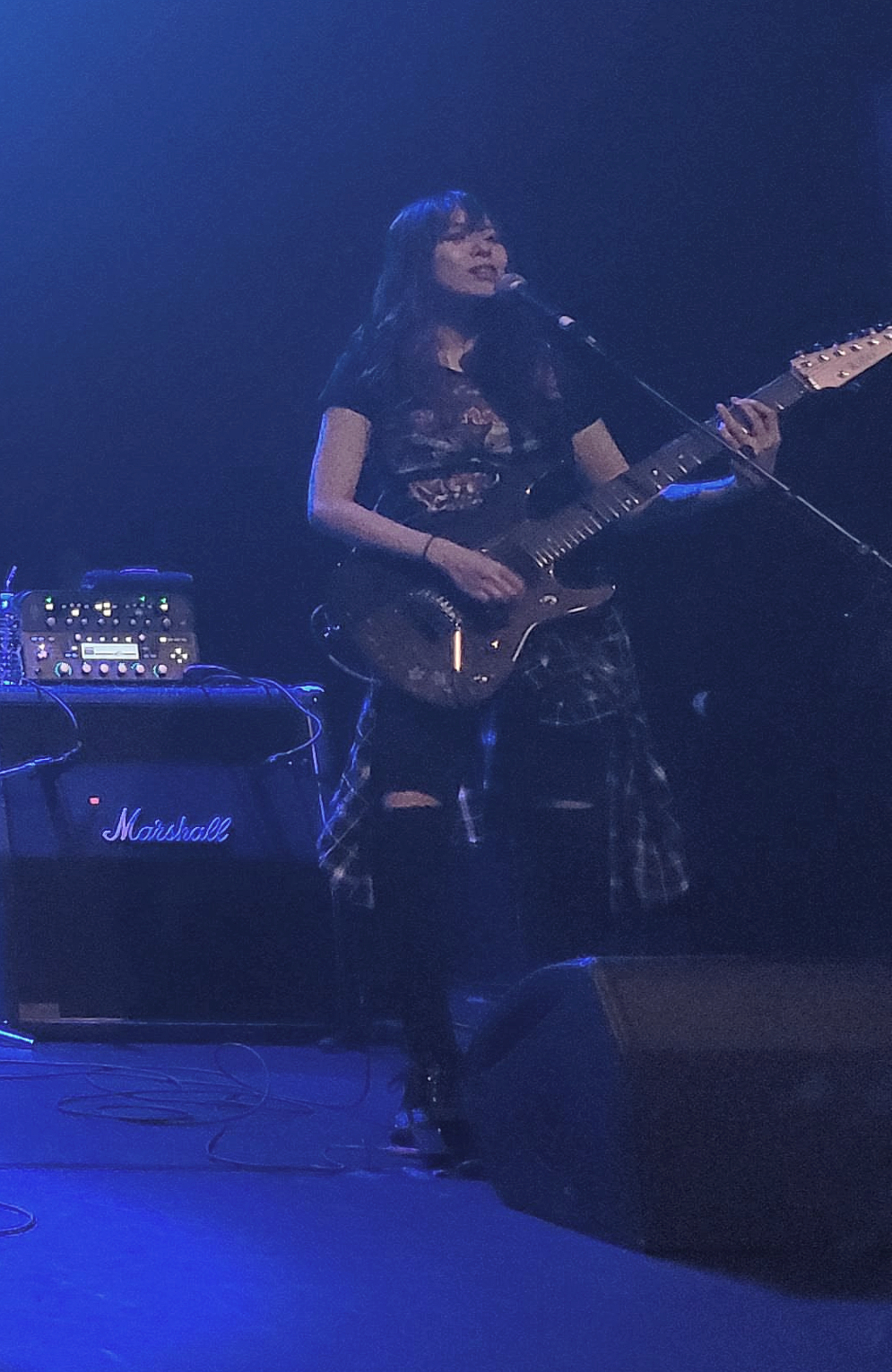
- Saki in 2023

Background information
- Born: October 4, 1990 (age 36); Tokyo, Japan
- Genre: Heavy metal
- Occupations: Musician, songwriter
- Instrument: Guitar
- Years active: 2009–present
- Label: King
- Formerly of: Destrose; Mary's Blood; Nemophila
- Website: chakixxfc.com

Saki (サキ; born October 4, 1990) is a Japanese heavy metal musician and songwriter, best known as guitarist of the band Mary's Blood from 2012 until their hiatus in 2022. She is currently active as a solo artist, as one-half of the duo Amahiru with Frédéric Leclercq, and in the rock band Like-an-Angel. Before making her professional debut as part of the short-lived rock trio Mixx in 2010, Saki was briefly a member of the pioneering all-female metal band Destrose, and was later a member of Nemophila from 2019 to 2024. She has been sponsored by Killer Guitars since she was a teenager, and often uses custom-made Fascist models. In 2021, they released her signature model, the seven-string KG-Fascinator Seven the Empress.

== Early life ==
Saki was born on October 4, 1990, in the suburbs of Tokyo. Although her family lived in Kobe for a time due to her father's work, she was too young to remember it. Saki has a younger brother, three years her junior, who designs some of her merchandise. Her mother died in an accident when she was six years old. Saki started playing piano in elementary school, but hated it because of the strict teachers. However, she continued the lessons for four or five years, learning how to read music, but says she has not touched the instrument since. Her father listened to Western music of the 1970s and 1980s, but she did not fall in love with it herself until junior high, when she started playing classical guitar. Although she had played trumpet as a member of the brass band since third grade, a female friend asked her to join the classical guitar club in the first year of junior high. There she played music by Southern All Stars, Spitz and the Beatles and developed her love of Western rock and pop music. She quit the brass band the following year, but stayed in her schools' guitar clubs until her third year of high school.

Brian May was the first guitarist Saki became a fan of and Queen + Paul Rodgers were the first musicians she ever saw live in her third year of junior high. She then worked backwards, listening to Rodgers' former bands Free and Bad Company. Her brother's love of professional wrestling also furthered her interest in Western rock and heavy metal, as the WWE often featured songs by acts such as Motörhead, Marilyn Manson, Metallica and Fozzy. She also started reading Young Guitar Magazine at this time, which included coverage of bands such as Bullet for My Valentine and Trivium. Saki said her inspiration to become a musician was seeing footage of Seikima-II's 2005 reunion on NHK and wanting to be their guitarist Jail O'Hashi. She received her first electric guitar and a small amplifier from the father of one of her brother's classmates. Three of the band's guitarists, O'Hashi, Ace Shimizu and Luke Takamura, had released instructional DVDs, so she bought them all and spent her summer vacation before high school practicing.

In high school, Saki was in a four-piece cover band named Kathy & Carol (キャシー＆キャロル), with whom she had her first live performance competing in a contest judged by Face to Ace, a duo featuring Shimizu. She attended weekly guitar classes put on by the Yamaha Corporation, where she learned things such as pentatonic scales. Also in high school, she performed with Rolly at an acoustic guitar seminar he held. In April 2009, Saki began attending her father's alma mater, Keio University. She majored in aesthetics and art history at its Faculty of Letters. She ended up having to repeat her senior year, eventually graduating in spring 2014. Towards the end of her first year there, Saki was invited to join the heavy metal band Destrose as a support guitarist via Mixi. It was her first band that played original material and is where she first began using the stage name "SAKI". (Note: Saki wrote that the leader of Destrose insisted each band member's name be two moji (文字; 'characters') long, but also notes that her stage name has always been written in all capital English alphabet letters, with the exception of her work in Like-an-Angel, where it is written in all lowercase letters.) She also had her first recording session with them, but said it was only a guitar solo. Saki estimated she was a member of the pioneering all-female metal band for only 10 months.

== Career ==
=== Mixx and Mary's Blood: 2010–2022 ===
Saki made her professional debut in July 2010 as a member of the all-female rock trio Mixx alongside vocalist Asuka and drummer Jackson. She explained that it was formed by an agency with the concept of featuring girls in maid outfits. Record label Exellex released their first two singles, "Agepoyo Let's Go!" and "Bye 3", on October 13 and the band played their first concert on October 29. "Agepoyo Let's Go!" is the first song Saki wrote that was commercially released; she wrote it in less than five days in order to compete for a television tie-up opportunity, which it won. (Note: Because she was busy with university, Saki was absent during the recording of the vocals and the other members and their staff added lyrics when it was determined the chorus was missing some. Saki said this still slightly bothers her.) A third single, "Heavy Metal Sweets", was released on January 12, 2011. Some of their songs were composed by Kiyoshi of hide with Spread Beaver. Saki participated in the Muon no Yaon charity event hosted by Show-Ya on May 7, 2011. Admission was free but donations were encouraged to aid recovery from the 2011 Tōhoku earthquake and tsunami, which is the reason the concert used as little electricity as possible. Mixx disbanded in May 2011, before the June 8 release of their fourth single "Lil' Devil's Lullaby" and August 10 release of their self-titled album. In August 2011, Saki formed an all-female band named Re:Maker. When the vocalist left, leaving a trio of Saki, bassist Fin and drummer Anri, they decided to utilize the Vocaloid voice-synthesizing software. Re:Maker released the mini-album Neo-Invasion on August 25, 2012. Saki later credited intrigue around Vocaloid at the time as being the reason they were able to appear on television and perform in South Korea, the latter marking her first international performance. Re:Maker went on hiatus in June 2013, as the members became busy with other projects.

In July 2012, Saki joined the all-female heavy metal band Mary's Blood. It had been formed two and a half years prior by her predecessors in Destrose, before they asked her to audition when their guitarists were leaving. She went on to become the main composer of songs in the band. Mary's Blood performed their first international show in Houston, Texas at Anime Matsuri 2013, and then signed to major record label Nippon Columbia for the release of their first album Countdown to Evolution on August 20, 2014. Readers of heavy metal magazine Burrn! voted Mary's Blood second place in its best new artist category. The band switched to Victor Entertainment for their second album, Bloody Palace on October 7, 2015. Mary's Blood switched labels again for their fourth album Revenant, released on April 18, 2018 by Tokuma Japan Communications. Around this time, Saki was involved in an unspecified criminal act and the subsequent trouble related to it took a toll on her mental state. At the same time, disagreements in musical direction appeared in the band, which furthered her mental exhaustion to the point she told their management agency that she could not continue in the summer of 2018. The agency accommodated her, which included talks of a project that would later lead to the formation of Nemophila, and Saki said this alleviated some of her mental stress and allowed her to continue in Mary's Blood.

While working on the band's June 12, 2019 album Confessions, Saki experienced a disconnect between what the other members wanted to do and what she felt was best for the band, and considered quitting. This resulted in her composing only three songs for the album. Around the time Mary's Blood were live-streaming concerts without an audience in 2020 due to the COVID-19 pandemic in Japan, the band members discussed leaving their agency due to a strained-relationship with the company, but, because they did not want to manage everything themselves again, they instead decided to take a break. In her autobiography, Saki wrote that some members wanted to continue, but others did not. Although she personally felt they should disband since there were no plans to resume activities in the near future, she understood the sentiment that it was "important that the band's name lives on", thus they chose to go on hiatus. After touring to support their self-titled sixth studio album, which was released on September 29, 2021, Mary's Blood began the indefinite hiatus on April 9, 2022.

In December 2015, Saki began writing the column "Chucky no Jigoku Yori Ai wo Komete" (ちゃっきーの地獄より愛を込めて; lit. 'From Chucky's Hell with Love') for Young Guitar Magazine. The first 102 entries were compiled into the book Guitarist: Saki ni Yoru Jiyū Kimamana Metal Talk! Chucky ̄no Jigoku Yori Ai wo Komete (ギタリスト：SAKIによる自由気ままなメタル・トーク！ ちゃっきーの地獄より愛をこめて), which was published on October 6, 2025. Saki played guitar on two songs from Zwei's 2015 album Neo Masque and two songs from Animetal the Second's 2016 album Blizzard of Animetal the Second. She also contributed guitar to the song "Frozen Rose" from the 2017 album Astraia by Yashiro, Mary's Blood's live support guitarist. After taking part in a similar performance at Naon no Yaon 2017, Saki organized the World Guitar Girls Collection project which features several female rock guitarists playing famous songs in instrumental medley format. World Guitar Girls Collection Vol. 0 took place on July 17, 2017 and featured a performance by five guitarists, but was mainly a Mary's Blood and Cyntia concert. Another performance took place at that year's Classic Rock Jam on November 25, but the first standalone World Guitar Girls Collection concert was held on August 19, 2018. Saki also played on three singles by the horror punk idol group XTeen; 2018's "Eclipse" and "Romanticist", and 2019's "The New Black".

=== Nemophila and Amahiru: 2019–2024 ===
At the beginning of 2019, when Saki was questioning her future in Mary's Blood, their management agency offered her the job of producing a band that featured new female vocalist Mayu for an upcoming event. After several meetings, Saki decided it would be easier for her to join as a full member instead. Drummer Tamu Murata said she decided to join once Saki had, Saki called Hazuki out of the blue when it was decided to have a twin guitar lineup, and Mayu recruited her classmate Haraguchi-san as bassist. After supporting Mayu at an August 2019 live session, the five musicians decided to form a real band as they felt the line-up was too good to be a one-off. Because she was originally approached to be the producer, was the oldest member and the one with the most musical experience, Saki said she said felt pressure and a sense of responsibility to speak up on certain things and ended up having to lead the group. This was the complete opposite of the dynamics in Mary's Blood, and she said she struggled with how to act with her juniors as she tried her hardest to make the band a success.

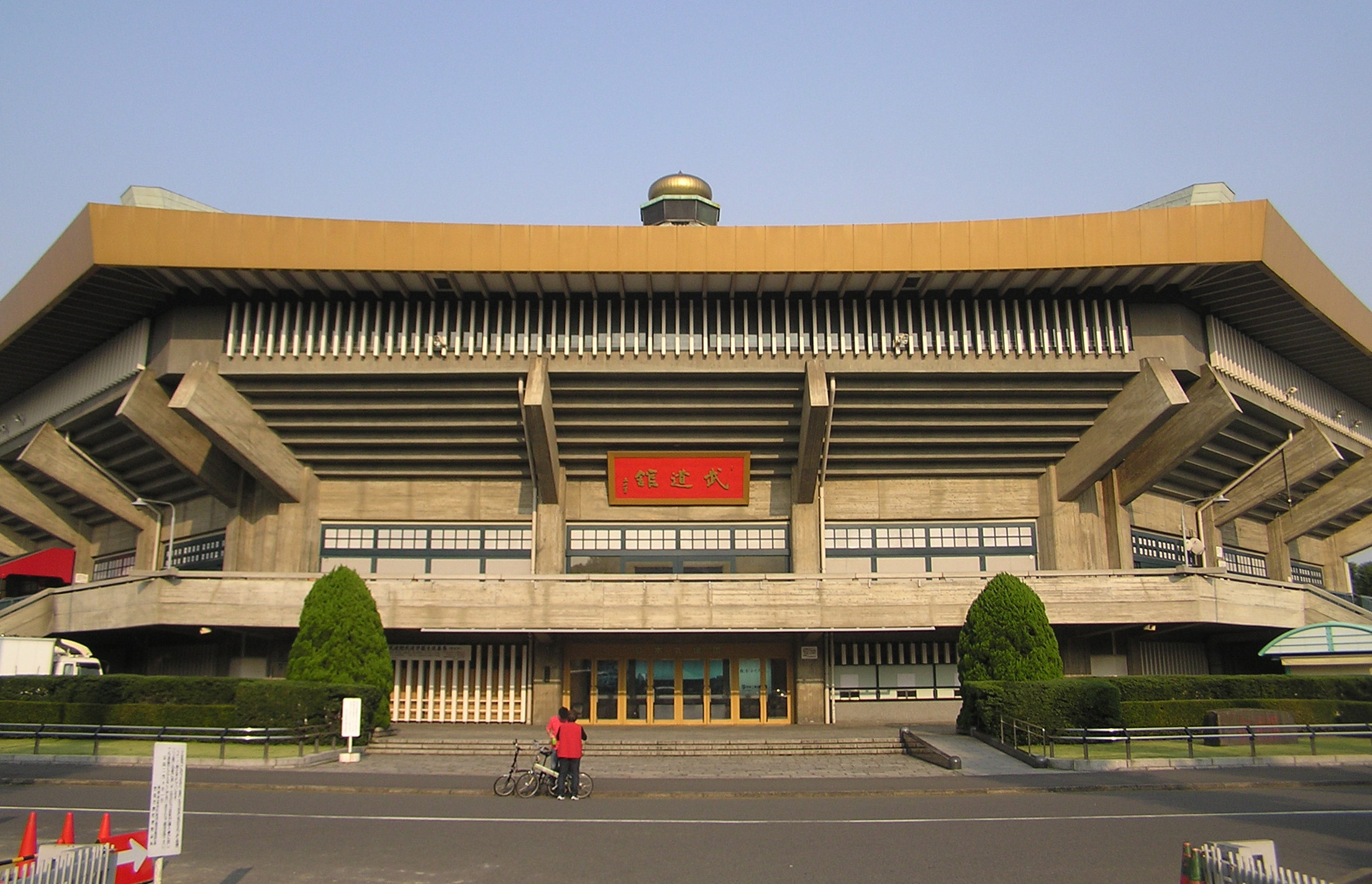
Saki's last concert with Nemophila took place at the Nippon Budokan.

Nemophila played their first concerts on September 14 and 15 as part of Metal Weekend 2019 at Zepp Diver City, where they opened for Loudness and HammerFall, and released their first single "Oiran" on February 29, 2020. Saki's brother designed the band's mon-like logo based on their namesake flower. "Raitei", their second single, was released on August 22, 2020. Third single "Dissension" followed on February 28, 2021. On June 25, 2021, British record label JPU Records released Oiran - Extended Edition, which compiles the band's entire discography up to that point from the singles sold only via Nemophila's official website and a newly recorded English version of "Dissension". Nemophila released their first album Revive on December 14, 2021. After two further studio albums, Seize the Fate (2022) and Evolve (2024), and a Nippon Budokan concert celebrating their fifth anniversary, it was announced that Saki had left Nemophila on March 31, 2024 due to "differences in direction". In her autobiography, Saki wrote that various circumstances had changed after the band returned from their March 2023 American tour and that she was also experiencing unspecified personal troubles at the time. She wrote that she felt like an outsider due to the age gap between her and the other members, but also that they were now able to continue without her. Although Saki had discussions with the agency to explore various options, both parties eventually agreed to her leaving the band in March 2024.

In 2020, Saki formed the musical project Amahiru with French musician Frédéric Leclercq, who came up with the name in a dream. Saki performs lead guitar, while Leclercq plays lead, rhythm and bass guitar. The two first met in 2015 when Mary's Blood opened for Leclercq's then-band, DragonForce, in Hong Kong. Saki said they discussed making music that combines western and eastern elements, and when she talked about making a solo album, her record label suggested she ask Leclercq to play on it, "But it was so fun to work with him and we both had a lot of ideas, so we decided to make Amahiru as its own project." Amahiru's self-titled debut album was released worldwide on November 27, 2020, and features British vocalist Archie Wilson, Dutch keyboardist Coen Janssen and American drummer Mike Heller. It also features shakuhachi player Kifu Mitsuhashi, and guest performances by Elize Ryd and Sean Reinert.

=== Solo career and Like-an-Angel: 2020–present ===
Also in 2020, Saki took part in Shred Racers Online F2, an event produced by Young Guitar Magazine and Nippon Cultural Broadcasting to showcase technical guitarists. The event released a cover of Lisa's "Gurenge" and the original song "Richromatic", both of which feature Saki alongside several other musicians. Saki began an instrumental solo career with the February 10, 2021, release of "Brightness", which features Leclercq on bass, Epica keyboardist Coen Janssen, and drummer Shun Minari from Blindman. She composed the song with fans during the COVID-19 pandemic; while streaming on TwitCasting, they gave her their opinions on Twitter in real time. In 2023, she was one of many guest musicians to contribute to three different albums by Kisaki.

Saki made her debut as a guitarist of Like-an-Angel, a L'Arc-en-Ciel cover band that was formed earlier in the year by L'Arc-en-Ciel bassist Tetsuya, at Hibiya Open-Air Concert Hall on October 7, 2023. The other members are vocalist Jekyll, Vivid guitarist Reno and Matenrou Opera drummer Hibiki. She was contacted by Tetsuya's office via email after they saw some of her YouTube videos because Reno could not participate in the then-upcoming concert. Although she knew of L'Arc-en-Ciel, she did not have any attachment to their music, but decided to accept the offer. Saki's second solo single "Germinans" was released on February 18, 2024, and she held her first solo concert at Yokohama Bay Hall on June 21, where she was supported by drummer Senri Kawaguchi and Gacharic Spin member Hana on guitar. The Germinans EP was released on the same day as the concert and includes "The Empress" in addition to the two previous singles. Like-an-Angel went on their first tour from September 15 to October 3, 2024, and released the original song "Angel Beside You" on June 4, 2025. Saki's first tour as a solo artist, Autumn Rain, was held between September 6 and 15, with the two-track CD "Redemption / Tempest" sold only at its concerts. "Crash to Rise", Like-an-Angel's second single, which Saki co-composed the music to, was released on December 17.

Saki's second tour, Pluvia, ran from February 13, 2026, to March 19. Her autobiography, Saki no Oto. ~Guitarist Saki Jijoden~ (サキノオト。〜ギタリストSAKI自叙伝〜), was published by Shinko Music Entertainment on February 14. Saki made her debut on King Records' Nexus label on June 24 with her first solo album, Pluvia. It features guests such as Gus G and Nogod bassist Hibiki, and was supported by a tour of the same name from July 4, to August 11. JPU Records released the album outside Japan on August 26.

== Songwriting ==
When composing, Saki said she has to think about the person who will be singing the song because the vocalists for Mary's Blood, Nemophila and Amahiru are all different. For example, Mayu likes to scream sometimes and Archie is a man. She described Mary's Blood as a straight heavy metal band, but because they have many different styles of songs, she feels free to make whatever sounds she wants with them. The guitarist explained that Eye and Rio love visual kei music, which sometimes makes it difficult to find the tones to match the vocals. When writing for Mary's Blood, she composes practically everything in the song, except for some drum fills that Mari comes up with. Saki played a seven-string guitar for the first time on their 2016 song "Angel's Ladder", while 2018's "On the Rocks" marked the first time she played a bottleneck guitar solo.

Saki has said the most important thing in Nemophila was to play "hard music like metalcore, but make it 'yurufuwa', to give it more of a personality. A Japanese word, it means... fluffy and smooth." In contrast to Mary's Blood, where the members wrote many songs and chose from them to make an album, Saki said she wrote songs in a selective and targeted manner for Nemophila. There was a composer team who worked behind the scenes, so Saki and the team composed songs at the same time and gave the members the MIDI data. The band members and their staff then voted on which songs got included on the album. Saki described fellow guitarist Hazuki as the complete opposite of herself; her picking is soft and nuanced, compared to Saki's aggressive and straightforward style. In general, Saki said she played her guitar with a slightly lower sound than Hazuki.

Saki described the music of Amahiru as more hard rock in comparison to Mary's Blood's straight heavy metal, and feels it should therefore be a "little more modern" and have less distortion. She also said that she plays a lot more aggressive than in Mary's Blood. Both Saki and Leclercq wrote songs for the project, but it was Leclercq who felt having the European style from him and the Japanese style from her would "sound really cool" together. Saki then wrote more using Japanese scales and the two put everything together and finished writing when Leclercq visited Japan.

== Equipment ==
Saki has been sponsored by Killer Guitars since 2009, and often uses custom-made Fascist models. Her first electric guitar was an unknown make and model that Saki has said looked similar to a Char Mustang. Because it had no logo, Seikima-II guitarist Ace Shimizu autographed its headstock. Several months or a year after receiving that guitar, she bought a Killer Fascist Grave Stone in her second year of high school, which is a signature model of Seikima-II's Luke Takamura. She also eventually bought two other Seikima-II signature models; Shimizu's Caparison Angelus-Ace and Jail O'Hashi's Aria Pro II RS-Jail. When Saki met George Azuma, president of Killer Guitars, at a musical instrument fair and told him that she played their brand, Azuma said they would support her. Saki has been sponsored by Killer ever since. She explained that she used Fernandes Guitars during Mixx because of her agency at the time, but received permission from Killer to do so.

With a body sculpted to have a stone-like texture and a carving of a hand leaving scratch marks, and with Takamura's autograph on the back of the headstock, the KG-Fascist Grave Stone was her main guitar when she joined Mary's Blood. She named it "Ao Kirako" (蒼きらこ) and swapped the pickups to Seymour Duncan; a '59 Bridge (SH-1b) in the front, and a Duncan Custom (TB-5) in the back. Saki then had "Beni Kirako" (紅きらこ) made in 2014 to commemorate the band's major debut. It is a red KG-Fascist Vice model with an EMG 81 pickup in the front, an EMG 85 in the back, and a steampunk pick guard. In 2021, Killer released her signature model, the KG-Fascinator Seven the Empress. After borrowing a prototype seven-string guitar from Killer to record "Angel's Ladder", Saki started writing songs for seven-strings and had them make one using the Stratocaster-like shaped body of the Fascist Vice. With the body made out of alder because she likes the sound, she had the maple neck with ebony fretboard made slightly thinner than most seven-string guitars because of her small hands. It has Seymour Duncan pickups, a SH-10b-7 Full Shred in the front and a SH-8b-7 Invader in the back, and a "galaxy black" paint job with cherry blossom petals added because she wanted it to still be cute and "girlish". Saki named hers "Wagara-chan" (和柄ちゃん). She also has signature guitar picks with Killer. In Like-an-Angel, she uses a red, single-coil Killer guitar that is shaped like a Stratocaster, and which she had modified, including asking for the same pickups that Ken uses.

To commemorate her tenth anniversary as a musician, Saki partnered with Young Guitar Magazine to create a line of limited edition guitar straps. The guitarist revealed that manufactured guitar slides are too big for her thin fingers, so she inspected all the bottles in her house until finding that salt bottles fit perfectly and said she planned to bring them on tour with her. Saki's Marshall Custom Shop Tattoo Series amplifiers have become one of her trademarks. It has a CSJVM410T5 head and a CS1960AT5 cabinet, with a Fractal Audio Systems Axe-Fx III. She bought it in 2014 due to its flashy paint job of a skeleton and said it was the only one in Japan at the time because the distributor thought no one would want them. Towards the end of 2023, she bought a Bogner Ecstasy Pandora. In April 2022, Saki's guitar pedalboard consisted of a MIDI foot controller to the Axe-Fx III, a Boss FV-500 volume pedal, and a Morley 20/20 Bad Horsie Wah (MTBH2) wah pedal.

== Discography ==
=== Solo ===
- "Brightness" (February 10, 2021)
- "Germinans" (February 18, 2024)
- Germinans EP (June 21, 2024), Oricon Singles Chart Peak Position: 40
- "Redemption / Tempest" (September 2025, sold only on the Autumn Rain tour)
- "Horizon" (February 12, 2026, sold only on the Pluvia tour)
- Pluvia (June 24, 2026), Oricon Albums Chart Peak Position: 41

=== With Mixx ===
- "Agepoyo Let's Go!" (あげぽよ☆レッツゴー！; October 13, 2010) 111
- "Bye 3" (Bye3（バイバイバイ）; October 13, 2010) 107
- "Heavy Metal Sweets" (January 12, 2011)
- "Lil' Devil's Lullaby" (小悪魔☆ララバイ, Koakuma Rarabai; June 8, 2011)
- Mixx - Japanese Edition (August 10, 2011)

=== With Re:Maker ===
- Neo-Invasion (August 25, 2012)

=== With Amahiru ===
- Amahiru (November 27, 2020) 114

=== With Like-an-Angel ===
- "Angel Beside You" (June 4, 2025)
- "Crash to Rise" (December 17, 2025)
- "Into the Unknown" (December 23, 2026)

=== Other work ===
- Zwei; Neo Masque (2015) – guitar on "H-A-R-D-E-R" and "Star Queen -Action 2-"
- Animetal the Second; Blizzard of Animetal the Second (2016) – guitar on "Fallen Angel" and "Kimi ga Suki da to Sakebitai"
- Yashiro; Astraia (2017) – guitar on "Frozen Rose"
- XTeen; "Eclipse" (2018) – guitar
- XTeen; "Romanticist" (2018) – guitar
- NHORHM; New Heritage of Real Heavy Metal III (2018) – guitar on "Top of the Babylon"
- XTeen; "The New Black" (2019) – guitar
- XTeen; "Gloria" (2022) – guitar
- XTeen; Helthy Smile Punk Rock! Vol. 2 (2023) – guitar on "I Wanna Be Your Dog"
- Kisaki; Providence (2023) – guitar on "Sacred Xanadu"
- Kisaki; Afterglow (2023) – guitar on "Wingless Wing"
- Kisaki; Preuve d'etre (2023) – guitar on "Dedicate to Graveyard"
- Maki Oyama; I Am (2025) – guitar on "Hail Mary"
- Gus G; Steel Burning Live (2026) – guitar solo on "Murders in the Rue Morgue"
- Doll$Boxx; Dolls Aether (2027) – guitar on the deluxe edition's live concert Blu-ray
