= Cross Vein =

Japanese symphonic power metal band

- Origin: Tokyo, Japan
- Genres: Power metal; symphonic metal
- Years active: 2007–2023
- Labels: Victor Entertainment; Zeno Records Japan
- Past members: You; Yoshi; Carlos; Ryo; Ibuki; Julia; Kuro; Taki; Isseki; Yosuke; Masumi; Koh; Shoyo; Ko-suke; Yosuke Yamada; Keitaro; ShinKi; Zary
- Website: crossvein.net

Cross Vein was a Japanese symphonic power metal band active from 2007 to 2023. They have released 4 studio albums, 1 video album and 14 singles.

== History ==
The band was founded in 2007 by producer Nancha and drummer Van-ry in Tokyo. A full line-up was assembled, including vocalist Ibuki, later of Destrose and Fate Gear. In 2009, she was replaced by Julia. By 2010, the only remaining original member was Yoshi. The band released several independent songs as singles until 2011. Their debut album, Birth of Romance, was released in 2012. In 2015, they made their major debut with the album Royal Eternity, released via Victor Entertainment. Their third album, Gate of Fantasia, produced by Hizaki of Versailles, was released in 2018 via Zeno Records Japan.

Cross Vein's April 2020 single "Beautiful Warrior" was ranked No. 7 on Oricon's weekly Indies Singles chart. Fourth album, titled Life of Veins, was released independently on February 3, 2021. It was ranked No. 8 on Oricon's Indies Albums chart. In 2022 they released a single titled "Silver Lining", which debuted at No. 10 on the Indies Singles chart.

Following a 15th anniversary live show, Cross Vein announced their disbandment on February 25, 2023.

== Members ==
=== Last line-up ===
- Julia – vocals (2009–2023)
- Masumi – guitars (2013–2023)
- Keitaro – keyboards (2016–2023)
- Zary – bass (2019–2023)

=== Former members ===
- You – bass (2008–2010)
- Yoshi – guitars (2008–2021)
- Carlos – guitars (2008–2009)
- Ryo – keyboards (2008–2010)
- Ibuki – vocals (2008–2009)
- Kuro – guitars (2009–2010)
- Taki – guitars (2010–2012)
- Isseki – keyboards (2011–2014)
- Yosuke – bass (2013–2014)
- Koh – drums (2013–2014)
- Shoyo – bass (2014–2019)
- Ko-suke – drums (2014–2015)
- Yosuke Yamada – drums (2016)
- ShinKi – drums (2017–2021)

== Discography ==
=== Studio albums ===
- Birth of Romance (2012)
- Royal Eternity (2015)
- Gate of Fantasia (2018)
- Life of Veins (2021)

=== Video albums ===
- Special Live Theater of Cross Vein 2020～Return of Warriors～ (2020)

=== Singles ===
- "Aspiration" (2008)
- "Burning Beat" (2008)
- "Destination" (2009)
- "Atonement" (2010)
- "Moon Addict" (2011)
- "Profusion" (2013)
- "Maid of Lorraine" (2014)
- "The Revival" (2017)
- "True Castle" (2019)
- "Beautiful Warrior" (2020)
- "Icarus" (2021)
- "Black Fairytale" (2021)
- "Silver Lining" (2022)
- "Meteor" (2022)
