= Blizzard of Animetal the Second =

Studio album by Animetal the Second
- Released: April 6, 2016
- Recorded: 2015
- Genres: Heavy metal; anison
- Length: 49:48
- Languages: Japanese; English
- Label: Gr8! Records
- Producer: Dark Knight

Animetal the Second chronology
Animetal the Second (2015)	Blizzard of Animetal the Second (2016)

Blizzard of Animetal the Second (ブリザード・オブ・アニメタル・ザ・セカンド, Burizādo obu Animetaru za Sekando) is the second full-length album by Animetal the Second, a solo project by anonymous female singer Queen.M. Released through Gr8! Records on 6 April 2016, the album includes the original song "Fallen Angel", written by Loudness lead vocalist Minoru Niihara. It also features guest performances by Loudness members Akira Takasaki and Masayoshi Yamashita, ex-Anthem drummer Hirotsugu Homma, Skid Row guitarist Scotti Hill, Mr. Big guitarist Paul Gilbert, Seikima-II guitarist Luke Takamura, Mary's Blood guitarist Saki, and The Winery Dogs vocalist/guitarist Richie Kotzen.

The album peaked at No. 140 on Oricon's weekly albums chart.

== Track listing ==
All tracks are arranged by Yoichi Tanoue, except track 1 by Shigeru Sakura and Tanoue, track 7 by F.A.B., and track 9 by Naoki Endō.

No.	Title	Original anime/film	Length
1.	"Overture -Theme of Animetal the Second- Chapter 2"		2:54
2.	"Fallen Angel"		4:46
3.	"Rise"	Ghost in the Shell: Stand Alone Complex 2nd Gig	5:56
4.	"Moonlight Densetsu" (Mūnraito Densetsu (ムーンライト伝説; "Moonlight Legend"))	Sailor Moon	3:17
5.	"We Are!" (Uī Ā! (ウィーアー！))	One Piece	4:36
6.	"Yasashisa ni Tsutsumareta Nara" ((やさしさに包まれたなら; "Wrapped in Kindness"))	Kiki's Delivery Service	5:34
7.	"Tamashī no Refrain" (Tamashī no Rufuran (魂のルフラン; "Soul Refrain"))	Neon Genesis Evangelion: Death & Rebirth	6:10
8.	"1/3 no Junjō na Kanjō" (Sanbun no Ichi no Junjō na Kanjō (1/3の純情な感情; "1/3 Pure Heart Emotion"))	Rurouni Kenshin (Season 3)	4:39
9.	"Sorairo Days" (Sorairo Deizu (空色デイズ; "Sky Blue Days"))	Gurren Lagann	4:09
10.	"Kimi ga Suki da to Sakebitai" ((君が好きだと叫びたい; "I Want to Shout 'I Like You'"))	Slam Dunk	4:05
11.	"This Is Halloween"	The Nightmare Before Christmas	3:49
Total length:			49:48

== Personnel ==
- Queen.M – Lead vocals
- Z.Z.T. – All instruments (except where indicated)

with

- Yoichi Tanoue – Guitar (2, 7, 11)
- Saki – Guitar (2, 10)
- Scotti Hill – Guitar (3)
- Paul Gilbert – Guitar (4)
- Luke Takamura – Guitar (5)
- Toru Meki – Guitar (6)
- Richie Kotzen – Guitar (8)
- Masayoshi Yamashita – Bass (2–3)
- Mr. Crowley – Bass (4, 7–8)
- Tatsuhiro Yoshida – Bass (6)
- Hirotsugu Homma – Drums (2–3)
- Jumping Frog – all instruments (9)
- Kohta Yoshizawa – Chorus (11)

== Charts ==
Chart (2016)	Peak position
Japanese Albums (Oricon)	140
