= Double gate =

Double gate or double gates is generally a pair of gates which open together. It may also refer to the following:

- One set of the Huldah Gates, a pair of sealed Gates of the Al Aqsa Compound.
- Multigate device, a type of transistor
- A type of locking mechanism in some carabiners

Two gates or Twin gates gate may refer to:

- Two gate chips, a type of integrated circuit
- Two Gates of Sleep, a 2010 film
- Twin Gate, a 2010 album by Exist Trace
- Open the Twin Gate Championship, a wrestling title

== See also ==
- Gate (disambiguation)
