= Taia (band) =

Japanese metal band

- Origin: Okinawa, Japan
- Genres: Gothic metal
- Years active: 1998–2013, 2017–present
- Label: 413Tracks
- Members: Seika; Taka; Ura; Yasha; Fuga; Ken
- Past members: Hakua; Higa; Ara

Taia (大鴉; literally "Raven") is a Japanese metal band from Okinawa, named after the Edgar Allan Poe poem "The Raven".

== History ==
The band was formed in 1998, by college classmates; Taka, Yasha and Hakua, as an Iron Maiden cover band. Their original female drummer is the one who named the band. Fellow student Seika soon joined and they felt having a vocalist who had never listened to heavy metal before would make their music more interesting.

In 2000, Taia released a self-titled demo and the following year a second, entitled "Sanctus". The group eventually found its current sound with the arrival of a keyboardist.

In 2002, Taia won a prize with their song "Beware". In the same year Fuuga replaced the old keyboardist, and the band released their first single "Sorrow".

In 2004 they released their second single, "Yumegatari". That same year, Taia went on their first tour in Tohoku, while Higa joined as second guitarist.

In February 2005, the band appeared on the Trendkill2005 compilation, and later in May on Total Steel Okinawa 2005. By the end of the year, on the 16th of November they released their first album, Asymmetry, which was followed by a tour in Okinawa, Tokyo and Osaka.

Drummer Hakua was replaced by Ara in 2006. On July 19 they released the EP Prayer, which was accompanied with a DVD.

In February and March 2007, the music videos for "Praise" and "Kazamai" were released, followed by their third album Seeds of Rain, on March 14. Soon after Taia began another tour.

On September 9, 2009 they released their third album Through Your Tears in two versions; Japanese and English.

Taia's song "Praise" was included on the January 15, 2011 compilation Iron Angel in preparation for their January 22 performance at the two-day Iron Angel Live event alongside other female metal acts such as Destrose, Ancient Myth and Dazzle Vision.

Taia stopped all musical activities at the end of 2013.

Taia reunited in 2017 to play at the fourth installment of the Okinawan Metal event "Balls of Steel" in support of their label-mates Soundwitch, who were also playing the event. They had initially only planned a one night reunion, but after the success of the show and with the re-emergence of the metal scene in Okinawa, they have continued to play through 2019.

== Members ==
- Seika – vocals
- Munekazu "Taka" Takayama – guitar
- Masanobu "Ura" Higa – guitar
- Kuniya "Yasha" Kawamitsu – bass
- Takuya "Fuga" Uehara – keyboards
- Kengo "Ken" Chibana – drums

=== Former members ===
- Hakua – drums (1998–2006)
- Ara – drums (2006–?)
- Higa – guitar (2004–?)

== Discography ==
=== Albums ===
- Asymmetry (November 16, 2005)
- Seeds of Rain (March 14, 2007; 10th Anniversary Edition December 3, 2017)
- Through Your Tears (September 9, 2009, Japanese edition)
- Fuu En Ya Sou -Taia 2010 Works- (風宴夜奏 -TAIA 2010 WORKS-; December 15, 2010)

=== Enhanced CDs ===
- Gray Ocean (August 1, 2007, limited Okinawa release)
- Through Your Tears (September 9, 2009, English edition)

=== EPs ===
- Prayer (July 19, 2006, came with a DVD)
- Einsatz (October 1, 2008, came with a DVD)

=== Singles ===
- "Sorrow" (2002)
- "Yumegatari" (夢がたり; 2003)

=== Demos ===
- "Taia" (大鴉; 2000)
- "Sanctus" (2001)

=== Omnibuses ===
- Trendkill2005 (February 2, 2005, "Sand and Rain" and "Wind Dance")
- Total Steel Okinawa 2005 (May 11, 2005, "Beware")
- Enter the Rampage (November 25, 2009, "Falling (English Version)")
- Iron Angel (January 15, 2011, "Praise")

=== DVDs ===
- Gekka Sou Sou Tour "Blessed Rain" (月下想奏 Tour "Blessed Rain"; September 19, 2007, two editions; Limited and Regular)
