= Nemophila (band) =

Japanese all-female heavy metal band

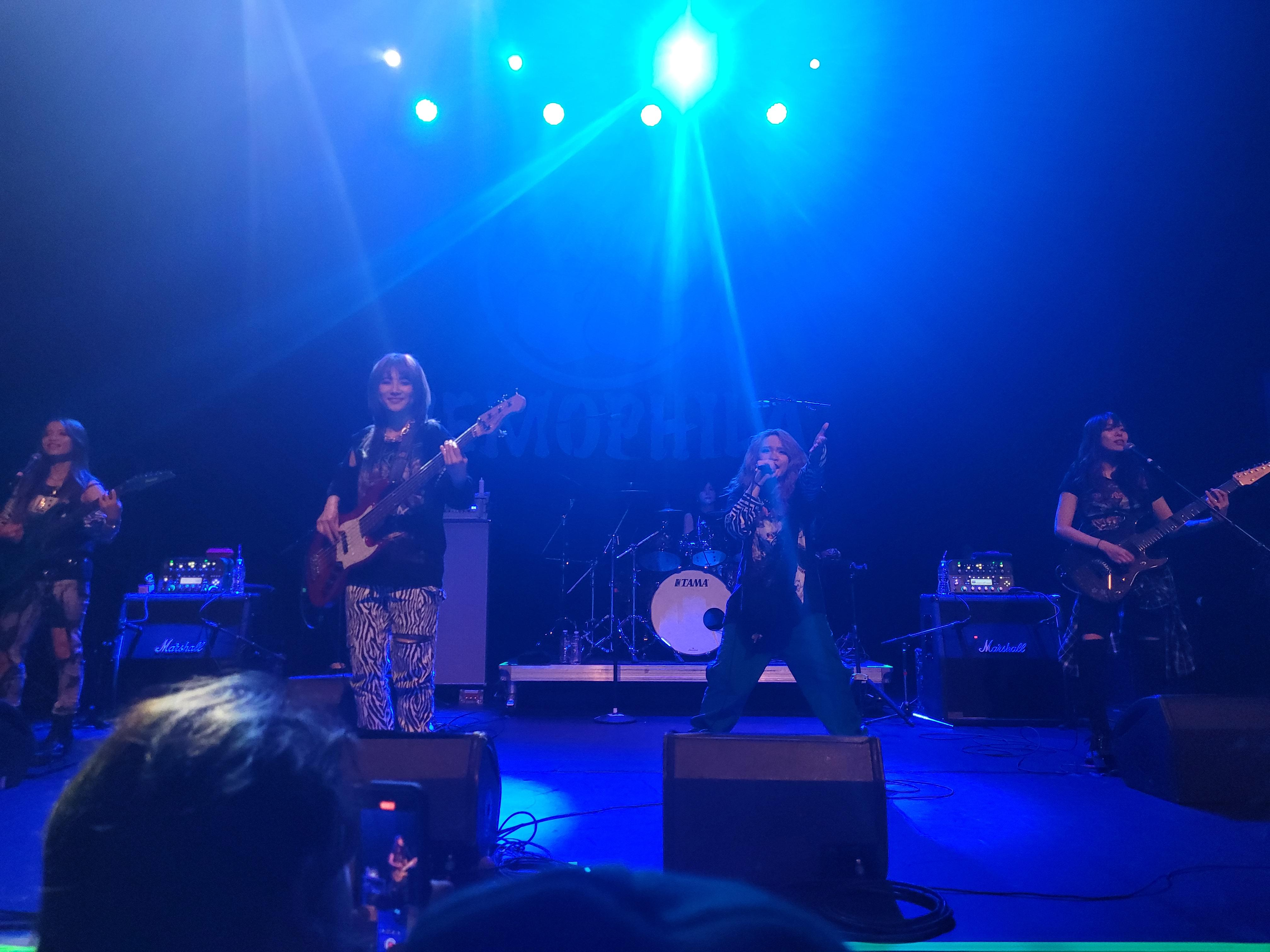
- Nemophila performing at Gramercy Theatre, New York in March 2023 (L-R: Hazuki, Haraguchi-san, Tamu, Mayu, Saki)

Background information
- Origin: Tokyo, Japan
- Genres: Heavy metal; metalcore
- Years active: 2019–present
- Labels: Master Works; JPU; Velocity
- Members: Mayu; Haraguchi-san
- Past members: Saki; Tamu Murata; Hazuki
- Website: nemophila.tokyo

Nemophila (Japanese: ネモフィラ, Hepburn: Nemofira) is a Japanese heavy metal band formed in Tokyo in 2019. It currently consists of vocalist Mayu and bassist Haraguchi-san. After releasing three singles between 2020 and 2021, Nemophila garnered a sizable multinational following online by uploading videos to YouTube. In June 2021, British record label JPU compiled the singles into the internationally released Oiran: Extended Edition. Nemophila released their debut studio album, Revive, in December 2021. Their most recent album, Apple of My Eye, was released in January 2025.

== History ==
=== 2019–2023: Formation, Revive, Seize The Fate, and early success ===
After leaving the rock band Lipstick, vocalist Mayu was looking to put together a backing band to support her at an August 22, 2019, live session at Wild Side Tokyo. She contacted her former classmate and bassist Haraguchi-san, and the two recruited former Soramimi drummer Tamu Murata through magazines and website posts. Mayu was introduced to Mary's Blood guitarist Saki through a mutual friend, and Saki in turn introduced them to Disqualia guitarist Hazuki. Feeling that this line-up was too good to be a one-off, the musicians decided to form a real band. According to Murata, Saki was initially only going to act as a supervisor to the group. It was after she decided to join as a full member, that Murata decided to join as well. When deciding the band name, Mayu said that the word "sorai" came to her and seemed refreshing, but its meaning "was difficult, so we tried to soften it." Because each member is female, Mayu wanted to use the name of a flower and searched many before they found Nemophila. Saki's younger brother designed the band's mon-like logo based on the flower.

Nemophila played their first concerts on September 14 and 15 as part of Metal Weekend 2019 at Zepp Diver City, where they opened for Loudness and HammerFall. They released their first single "Oiran" on February 29, 2020, and held their first one-man live that same day to a sold-out audience at Shibuya Rex. Due to Murata being on maternity leave, they were supported by Show-Ya drummer Miki "Mittan" Tsunoda. "Raitei", their second single, was released on August 22, 2020, the same day that Murata returned to live activities after giving birth in May. On November 14, Nemophila and Gacharic Spin livestreamed a concert led by Show-Ya frontwoman Keiko Terada.

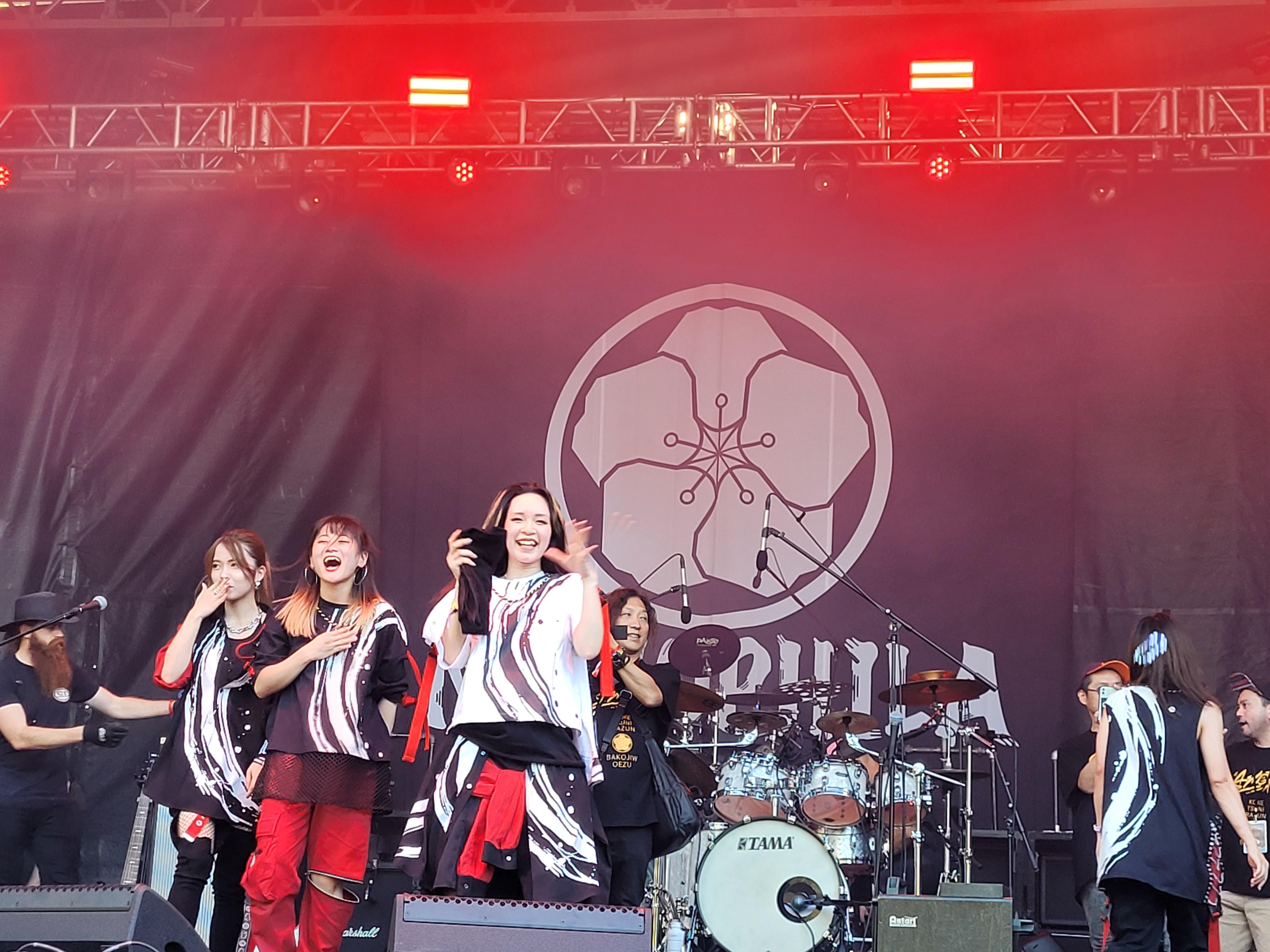
Nemophila on stage at Aftershock Festival in October 2022

Their third single "Dissension" followed on February 28, 2021. On April 29, the band performed at Show-Ya's all-female Naon no Yaon festival. On June 22, 2021, Kai of Esprit D'Air selected Nemophila as one of his top ten favorite rock and metal bands from Japan. Nemophila released their international compilation Oiran: Extended Edition from British label JPU Records on June 25. Compiling the band's entire discography up to that point, plus a new English version of "Dissension", it was the most pre-ordered album in the label's history. It also marked the first time the band's music had ever been available in record shops, as previously everything was sold directly from their website in Japan. Nemophila released their debut studio album Revive on December 15, 2021. Their first one-man concert with all five members at Line Cube Shibuya was performed on January 9, 2022 and the tickets sold out quickly after going on sale in October 2021. The video album Nemophila Live 2022 Revive ~It's Sooooo Nice to Finally Meet You!!!!!~ featuring the live performance on that day was released on May 11, 2022.

For each date of their first tour, which took place at various Zepp venues throughout June 2022, Nemophila was joined by one of the following acts; Mucc, Passcode, Loudness, Kishidan, or Rottengraffty. They released Revive U.S. Version, which includes the songs from their first studio album re-recorded in English, on June 21. On July 1, Nemophila played their first international concert in the United States at the Whisky a Go Go in West Hollywood, California. They also performed at Aftershock Festival in Sacramento, California on October 7. Seize the Fate, the band's second album, was released on December 14. Its tour ran from January to February 2023, and was followed by a three-date "US Tour" in March that included a date in Mexico. From May 31 to June 15, Nemophila held another Zepp tour where they were joined by a different act each night; Rottengraffty, Hanabie., Survive Said the Prophet, or Demon Kakka. They also served as Demon Kakka's backing band for his set. In July, they held two concerts in celebration of their fourth anniversary. The band released a covers extended play titled The Initial Impulse on November 8. It includes a cover of Limp Bizkit's "Stuck" that features Rottengraffty vocalists Naoki and Nobuya. Nemophila embarked on a one-man tour two days later.

=== 2024–2025: Evolve, Saki's departure, and Apple of My Eye ===
Nemophila released their third studio album, Evolve, on January 17, 2024. A concert celebrating their fifth anniversary was held at the Nippon Budokan on February 17. On March 31, it was announced Saki had left Nemophila due to "differences in direction" and the band would continue as a four-piece. Composer and producer Kensuke Akiyama also later announced he was no longer affiliated with the band, but said he was open to working with them again.

Nemophila had their first performance as a quartet at the 2024 Naon no Yaon festival on May 18, but their first standalone concert was held at Wild Side Tokyo on May 28. Following a tour with other acts that took place in June, they then held a one-man tour throughout August and September.

=== 2026–present: Murata and Hazuki's departure ===
In June 2026, Nemophila began performing with iKA as a support guitarist. On August 7, Nemophila announced that Tamu Murata officially left the band at the end of July but would continue performing with them as a support drummer until October 12, and that Hazuki would remain with the band until October 12, after which she too would leave Nemophila. They will release the five-track EP Michikarakusa, which was recorded with the four-member lineup, on December 9.

== Musical style and songwriting ==
Saki said the most important thing in Nemophila was to play "hard music like metalcore, but make it 'yurufuwa', to give it more of a personality. A Japanese word, it means... fluffy and smooth." She elaborated in another interview, "Traditionally, rock bands have a strong, masculine image. The concept of 'yurufuwa' is to stay close to ourselves rather than forcibly portraying our female identity as masculine. We thought it was interesting to make the cuteness of something fluffy come together with intense metal parts. You can feel it in the choruses of 'Dissension' and 'Raitei', but also in our behavior on stage." Hazuki cited the various ways in which Mayu sings as an important feature of Nemophila; "Her raw voice is very characteristic. That is why we were aiming for a heavier sound."

According to Saki, when the band first formed they started composing songs that combined "some little Japanese things, like in 'Oiran', some electronic elements and Japanese rock with lots of melodic elements." Although Saki composed some songs, Nemophila has a composer team that works behind the scenes and gives the members the MIDI data. Hazuki said they always welcomed input from composer/producer Kensuke Akiyama; "he tells us when a phrase is cool, or when we should try something different. He suggests in a song where Mayu should use a shout voice or where a phrase to go along with a shout might fit best." Saki described the process as not all that different from when the band writes their own songs; "After the songs are finished, we discuss the image the song has to convey with mister Akiyama and each other. Then we add our own ideas to the demos and that will be the foundation of the song."

Mayu cites Dave Grohl as an influence and utilizes both clean and screamed vocals. Although stating that the former is more challenging for her, she said switching between the two is even more difficult. Mayu writes many of the lyrics, but the vocal melodies were primarily written by Akiyama and Saki, who took her suggestions into consideration. The singer writes lyrics in both Japanese and English, which is determined by the song's melody; "If the melody has a relatively small number of sounds, I'm more tempted to write English lyrics. And when I have something to say based on what I hear, I write them in Japanese. But of course, it has to be pleasant to sing. And if that's in English, I'll sometimes change it flexibly to make it sound cool." Mayu also said that the lyrics are generally quite positive, which she cited as something that makes Nemophila unique.

In general, Saki said she played her guitar with a slightly lower sound than fellow guitarist Hazuki. They each created their own guitar solos, and Murata always created her own drum fills. Haraguchi-san alternates between fingerpicking and using guitar picks, but slightly prefers the former due to its thicker sound.

== Band members ==
=== Current ===
- Mayu – vocals (2019–present)
- Haraguchi-san (ハラグチサン) – bass guitar, backing vocals (2019–present)

=== Former ===
- Saki – guitar, backing vocals (2019–2024)
- Tamu Murata (むらたたむ) – drums, backing vocals (2019–2026)
- Hazuki (葉月) – guitar, backing vocals (2019–2026)

=== Support ===
- iKA – guitar (2026–present)

== Discography ==
Nemophila discography
- Studio albums: 4
- EPs: 2
- Compilation albums: 1
- Singles: 3
- Video albums: 3
- Music videos: 12

=== Studio albums ===
Title	Album details	Peak chart positions		
Title	Album details	JPN Oricon	JPN Billboard Hot	JPN Billboard Top
Revive	Released: December 15, 2021; Label: Master Works, JPU	8	7	9
Seize the Fate	Released: December 14, 2022; Label: Master Works	12	11	11
Evolve	Released: January 17, 2024; Label: Master Works	8	6	8
Apple of My Eye	Released: January 22, 2025; Label: Master Works	12	—	12

=== Compilation albums ===
Title	Album details
Oiran: Extended Edition	Released: June 25, 2021; Label: JPU

=== Extended plays ===
Title	EP details	Peak chart positions		
Title	EP details	JPN Oricon	JPN Billboard Hot	JPN Billboard Top
The Initial Impulse	Released: November 8, 2023; Label: Master Works	27	28	22
Gozo (五臓, Gozō)	Released: January 21, 2026; Label: Master Works	31	—	30

=== Video albums ===
Title	Video details	Peak chart positions
Title	Video details	JPN Oricon Blu-ray
Nemophila Live 2022 Revive ~It's Sooooo Nice to Finally Meet You!!!!!~	Released: May 11, 2022	10
Nemophila Tour 2023 -Seize the Fate-	Released: May 24, 2023	18
Nemophila 4th Anniversary -Rizing Nemo-	Released: November 8, 2023	13
Nemophila 5th Anniversary ~Jigoku no Yurufuwa Live at Nippon Budokan~	Released: June 5, 2024	3

=== Singles ===
Title	Year	Album
"Oiran"	2020	Oiran: Extended Edition and Revive
"Raitei" (雷霆)	2020	Oiran: Extended Edition and Revive
"Dissension"	2021	Oiran: Extended Edition and Revive

==== Digital singles ====
Title	Year	Album
"Revive"	2021	Revive
"Hypnosis"	2021	Revive
"A Ray of Light"	2022	Seize the Fate
"Adabana" (徒花)	2022	Seize the Fate
"Style"	2022	Seize the Fate
"Seize the Fate"	2022	Seize the Fate
"Rise"	2023	Evolve
"Night Flight"	2023	Evolve
"Enigma"	2023	Evolve
"Odyssey"	2023	Evolve

== Music videos ==
Song	Year	Director(s)	Link
"Raitei" (雷霆)	2020	Akira Matsuzaki	
"Dissension"	2021	Akira Matsuzaki	
"Revive"	2021	Akira Matsuzaki	
"Hypnosis"	2021	Akira Matsuzaki	
"Hōzuki" (鬼灯)	2021	Unknown	
"A Ray of Light"	2022	Unknown	
"Adabana" (徒花)	2022	Unknown	
"Style"	2022	Unknown	
"Dissension (U.S. version)"	2022	Chris Klumpp	
"Seize the Fate"	2022	Unknown	
"Rise"	2023	Unknown	
"Night Flight"	2023	Unknown	
