= Ancient Myth =

Japanese symphonic metal band

- Origin: Tokyo, Japan
- Genres: Symphonic metal; gothic metal
- Years active: 2002–2006, 2007–present
- Labels: Black-listed; Fastball; Repentless
- Members: Michal; Hal; Shibuki; Kaya; Raimu
- Past members: See former members
- Website: ancient-myth.com

Ancient Myth is a Japanese symphonic metal band formed in Tokyo in 2002 by drummer Mittu. After joining in 2008, vocalist Michal took over as leader of the band. Ancient Myth has gone through numerous line-up changes and, with guitarist Yuri's second departure in 2012, none of the original members remain.

== History ==
Ancient Myth was formed in 2002 by drummer and bandleader Mittu and his classmates while attending a music college. Numerous musicians came and went until 2005. That year, they contributed the song "Seed" to the omnibus album Samurai Metal Volume 01. The band released their debut mini-album Antibes on September 9, 2005, via Black-listed Records. At the end of April 2006, guitarist Mika left and formed Matenrou Opera. The band went on hiatus, during which time bassist Take also left. Ancient Myth resumed activities in March 2007. However, vocalist Akira left that month, and guitarist ANnen followed in August.

Michal, formerly of the bands Mandylion and Codename:Wingless, joined as vocalist in January 2008. While working as a designer for Black-listed, which Codename:Wingless was also signed to, she heard Ancient Myth was looking for a singer. Having previously had trouble finding a drummer and keyboardist for her band, Michal thought the transition would be smooth as Ancient Myth had a similar musical style, their leader was the drummer, and they already had a keyboardist. She subsequently went on to become the leader of the band and take charge of all visual aspects, designing the members' costumes, their album covers and their music videos. Guitarist Tomo and Lamentglace bassist Naoki also joined at the same time, and the band distributed the demos "Kegon" and "Kisayuragi" in October 2008 and March 2009, respectively. Tomo left in May 2009, at which point ANnen, now going by the name "Yuri", rejoined. Ancient Myth released their first single, "Aurora", on September 9, 2009.

The band distributed the demo "Distant View to the Ashen Light/Level X" in May 2010. In September, Syacho left Ancient Myth and they released their first full-length album Astrolabe in Your Heart on October 10. The album's title track was included on the January 15, 2011 compilation Iron Angel in preparation for the band's January 23 performance at the two-day Iron Angel Live event alongside other female metal acts such as Destrose, Taia and Light Bringer. Former bandleader Mittu left Ancient Myth in March 2011, and was replaced by Iron Attack! drummer Juhki that August. Following the Great East Japan Earthquake, Michal contributed vocals to the August 2011 charity album Rising Sun, which was released under the name Metal Bless Japan. Former SwallowTail keyboardist Puzzy joined Ancient Myth in October. The band's second album Akashic was released on February 24, 2012, and named after Akashic records. However, Yuri and Juhki both left after Ancient Myth's November 23, 2012 concert. The remaining members discussed changing the band's name or starting a new one, but Michal felt breaking up or changing the name would be admitting defeat. After holding open auditions, they recruited Valthus guitarist Izo in October 2013 and drummer PePe in December 2014.

In 2015, Ancient Myth signed a deal with the German record label Fastball Music. Aberration, which features re-recordings of older songs, was released in Japan and Europe in June 2016. Different editions feature different content and include a different subtitle, either "Au", "Ag", or "Pt". "Au" features Japanese lyrics, "Ag" features English ones, while "Pt" contains a mix and is the only version released physically. However, the band then suffered a string of personnel changes. Chief songwriter Naoki departed the group after the album's release. He was followed by Izo on July 4, and Puzzy on August 4. Keyboardist Hal, who produced Aberration and previously worked with Versailles and Kamijo, joined as the latter's replacement. That October, the band performed their first European concert at the Metal Female Voices Fest in Belgium. Ancient Myth toured Europe for the first time in March 2017, opening for Italian bands Temperance and Overtures on The Earth and The Artifacts tour, which took them to countries such as the Netherlands, Germany, France, and Switzerland.

Drummer Shibuki joined the band in 2018, while The Genius Orchestration guitarist Kohei joined in March 2020. After nine years, Ancient Myth published their third studio album ArcheoNyx on July 7, 2021, through Repentless Records. With songs inspired by myths and folklore, such as the Greek Nyx and the Japanese ōkami, it also features a cover of "Der Hölle Rache kocht in meinem Herzen" and Hizaki as a guest on "Zenith". It reached number 20 on Oricon's Rock Albums Chart. The mini-album Ambrosian Blood followed on December 15 and continues the style and themes, being named after the mythical food ambrosia.

In July 2023, Ancient Myth performed a two-date Asian tour titled Midsummer's Night Wish with Exist Trace and Fate Gear that took them to Hong Kong and Taipei. In February 2024, it was announced that guitarist Kohei would be leaving the band after a March 31, 2024 concert at Shinjuku Marz. However, a new line-up featuring guitarist Kaya and bassist Nino made its debut at that same show. Ancient Myth held the Apocalypse 666 tour from June 21 to August 10, where tickets cost 666 yen. A second leg took place between September 19 and November 17, while the third leg of the tour took place from February 11, 2025, to April 6. On September 3, it was announced that Nino had left the band the previous day. Ancient Myth announced Raimu as their new bassist on March 16, 2026. This lineup will release the single "Bloody Crescent" on June 24.

== Musical style ==
Despite their numerous personnel changes, Ancient Myth's musical style has never changed. Michal said that around the time of Antibes (2005), the members were influenced by Nightwish, which resulted in slower songs with a gothic metal feel. Michal's love of music began with the soundtracks to Japanese video games such as Final Fantasy and Dragon Quest and those scored by composers at Capcom and SNK. Knowing this, a CD shop employee recommended Ten and Fair Warning to her, an encounter Michal said "defined my musical life". She subsequently bought a lot of albums from a heavy metal specialty store and became absorbed in the genre. She cited Roy Khan (Kamelot) and Elisa C. Martin (Dark Moor) as her favorite singers, and Delain, Apocalyptica, Cradle of Filth, Dimmu Borgir, Amberian Dawn and Omega Lithium as among her favorite bands. Michal attended a Catholic school for twelve years, thus she grew up singing hymns. She and Hal both have experience playing classical piano.

In a tradition that began before Michal joined, the titles to all of the band's releases begin with the letter "A". In December 2011, Michal remarked how her predecessor, Akira, had an operatic singing style, like Nightwish. But Michal personally preferred to use a more masculine or "courageous" vocal style, like that of Martin in Dark Moor. Michal is the main lyricist in the band, and she uses both Japanese and English. Because she grew up with hymns, she typically uses classical Japanese, but will use colloquial Japanese if it fits the song's story. She said she does not write happy songs: "When I'm sad, I prefer to listen to sad or painful songs and let off some steam, so my lyrics are about finding light in the darkness, or fighting against yourself..." After chief songwriter Naoki left in 2016, Michal wanted to further develop her musical skills and so took violin lessons and singing lessons from a classical vocal coach. This resulted in her adopting an operatic and soprano vocal style.

Before Hal joined, no member of Ancient Myth was able to check their compositions from a classical theory standpoint, so they would send demos to people outside of the group who knew music theory. Hal also enabled the band to use real strings and brass to add a more grandiose feel, such as on ArcheoNyx (2021), instead of digital imitations. The keyboardist also started collaboratively writing lyrics with Michal on that album.

== Band members ==
Current

- Michal – vocals, bandleader (2008–present)
- Hal – keyboards (2016–present)
- Shibuki – drums (2018–present)
- Kaya – guitar (2024–present)
- Raimu – bass (2026–present)

Former

- Mika – guitar (–2006)
- Take – bass (–2006)
- Akira (旭) – vocals (–2007)
- Tomo – guitar (–2009)
- Syacho (紗蝶) – keyboards (2002–2010)
- Mittu – drums, bandleader (2002–2011)
- ANnen/Yuri – guitar (2002–2007, 2009–2012)
- Juhki – drum (2011–2012)
- PePe – drums (2013–)
- Naoki – bass (2008–2016)
- Izo – guitar (2013–2016)
- Puzzy – keyboards (2011–2016)
- Kohei – guitar (2020–2024)
- Nino – bass (2024–2025)

== Discography ==
Studio albums

- Astrolabe in Your Heart (October 10, 2010)
- Akashic (February 24, 2012)
- ArcheoNyx (July 7, 2021)

Mini-albums

- Antibes (September 9, 2005)
- Ambrosian Blood (December 15, 2021)

Self-cover albums

- Aberration (June 2016)

Singles

- "Aurora" (September 9, 2009)
- "Amarantos Blooms" (October 5, 2024)
- "Bloody Crescent" (June 24, 2026)

Home videos

- Awake to the Next Myth (February 18, 2012)
- Attracted to the Myth (January 10, 2024)
