= Naka-Kon =

Annual anime convention in Overland Park, Kansas, United States

Coordinates: 38°55′42″N 94°39′19″W

- Status: Active
- Genre: Anime
- Venue: Overland Park Convention Center and Sheraton Overland Park Hotel at the Convention Center
- Location: Overland Park, Kansas
- Country: United States
- Inaugurated: 2005
- Attendance: 10,264 in 2016
- Organizer: Naka-Kon Japanese Cultural Education Association
- Website: https://naka-kon.com/

Naka-Kon is an annual three-day anime convention held during May at the Overland Park Convention Center and Sheraton Overland Park Hotel at the Convention Center in Overland Park, Kansas. The name of the convention comes from the Japanese word for "center/middle".

== Programming ==
The convention typically offers an Artist Alley, contests, Dealers' Room, game shows, fashion show, maid cafe, panels, showings, video game rooms, and workshops.

== History ==
Naka-Kon was founded in 2005 by members of the University of Kansas Anime Club. The convention moved to the Overland Park Convention Center in 2012. Naka-Kon 2020 was cancelled due to the COVID-19 pandemic. Naka-Kon held a virtual convention in March 2021, a smaller event over Labor Day weekend in September, and in 2022 moved to Memorial Day weekend in May. The 2021 convention had an attendance cap of 2,500, with 2022 having a cap of 6,000.

=== Event history ===
Dates	Location	Atten.	Guests
April 17, 2005	University of Kansas; Lawrence, Kansas	300	
March 4–5, 2006	University of Kansas; Lawrence, Kansas		Greg Ayres, Steve Bennett, and Caitlin Glass.
March 2–4, 2007	Hilton Kansas City Airport; Kansas City, Missouri	1,529	Greg Ayres, Steve Bennett, Steve Blum, Caitlin Glass, Rob Mungle, Dustin Reudelhuber, and Angela Von Huber.
February 8–10, 2008	Kansas City Marriott Downtown; Kansas City, Missouri	2,091	Chris Bevins, Emily DeJesus, Robert DeJesus, Taliesin Jaffe, Dustin Reudelhuber, Christopher Sabat, Sonny Strait, Angela Von Huber, and Kari Wahlgren.
March 13–15, 2009	Hyatt Regency Crown Center; Kansas City, Missouri	3,135	Yamila Abraham, Amelie Belcher, Leah Clark, Chuck Huber, K-State Yosakoi, L33tStr33t Boys, Kevin McKeever, Brina Palencia, Chris Patton, Dustin Reudelhuber, and Angela Von Huber.
February 19–21, 2010	Hyatt Regency Crown Center; Kansas City, Missouri	4,084	Christopher Ayres, Greg Ayres, Amelie Belcher, Shion Francois, Kyle Hebert, K-State Yosakoi, Kojokan Shinbutai, Yumi Kwaguchi, M. Alice LeGrow, Peelander-Z, Wendy Powell, Dustin Reudelhuber, Eric Vale, Angela Von Huber, and Tommy Yune.
February 18–20, 2011	Hyatt Regency Crown Center; Kansas City, Missouri	4,684	Alsdead, Amelie Belcher, Samurai Dan Coglan, Gavin Goszka, Clarine Harp, Charlene Ingram, Kojokan Shinbutai, Brina Palencia, Dustin Reudelhuber, Patrick Seitz, DJ Sephiroth, J. Michael Tatum, Angela Von Huber, and Eric Wile.
February 10–12, 2012	Overland Park Convention Center; Overland Park, Kansas		Amelie Belcher, Blood Stain Child, Steve Blum, Aleathia Burns, Chris Cason, Colleen Clinkenbeard, Quinton Flynn, Yaya Han, DJ Infam0us, Wendee Lee, Nina Matsumoto, and Take One Productions.
March 15–17, 2013	Overland Park Convention Center; Overland Park, Kansas		Greg Ayres, Amelie Belcher, Blue Chee's, Christine Marie Cabanos, Richard Epcar, Kyle Hebert, Catherine Jones, Tony Oliver, and Nobuo Uematsu.
March 14–16, 2014	Overland Park Convention Center; Overland Park, Kansas	7,697	Amelie Belcher, Ben Bell, Chaka Cumberbatch, Destrose, Kevin McKeever, Scott McNeil, Atelier Pierrot, DJ Reeves, Revolution Boi, Monica Rial, Michelle Ruff, Team Whatever Cosplay, Travis Willingham, DJ Willis, and Steve Yun.
March 13–15, 2015	Overland Park Convention Center; Overland Park, Kansas	8,772	Greg Ayres, Rev. Barrish, Amelie Belcher, Fighting Dreamers Productions, Shion Francois, Hizumi, Jin, Robert Jones, Takashi Kisaki, Matthew Mercer, Hachioji P, Revolution Boi, Patrick Seitz, Andre "DJ Jinrei" Smith, Micah Solusod, Junko Takeuchi, Jessica Tran, Alexandra Watson, and Greg Wicker.
March 11–13, 2016	Overland Park Convention Center; Overland Park, Kansas	10,264	Yoh Asakura, Greg Ayres, Kevin Dooley, The Earthbound Papas, Chihiro Fujioka, Akira Fukaya, Michael Gluck, Jason Hayes, Yoshitaka Hirota, Michelle Jade, Roland Kelts, Timothy Koenig, Eru Matsumoto, Erica Mendez, Momo Hime, Tsutomu Narita, Benyamin Nuss, Michio Okamiya, Pros and Cons Cosplay, DJ Rob Reeves, Arnie Roth, Micah Solusod, Karen Strassman, Austin Tindle, Nobuo Uematsu, Mamoru Yokota, Apphia Yu (Ayu Sakata), and DJ Zombie Kitten.
March 10–12, 2017	Overland Park Convention Center; Sheraton Hotel; Overland Park, Kansas		Amelie Belcher, Ben Bell, Ray Chase, Robbie Daymond, Roland Kelts, Showshow Kurihara, Joel McDonald, Max Mittelman, A New World, Rondonrats, and David Vincent.
March 16–18, 2018	Overland Park Convention Center; Overland Park, Kansas		Ben Bell, Steve Blum, Sean Chiplock, Xanthe Huynh, Kabuki, Daniel Kanemitsu, Roland Kelts, Kill Screen, Nao Kurebayashi, Mary Elizabeth McGlynn, Moderately Okay Cosplay, DJ Chef Nguyen, Atelier Pierrot, Wendy Powell, Mikio Sakai, Masumi Sendou, Ian Sinclair, Strangecat Cosplay, Murata Tam, and Takayoshi Tanimoto.
March 15–17, 2019	Overland Park Convention Center; Overland Park, Kansas		Satomi Akesaka, Amelie Belcher, Kara Edwards, Ryuzou Ishino, Billy Kametz, Aya Kamiki, Roland Kelts, Kristen McGuire, Yoshinori Natsume, Alejandro Saab, Jad Saxton, and Keith Silverstein.
September 3–5, 2021	Overland Park Convention Center and Sheraton Overland Park Hotel at the Convention Center; Overland Park, Kansas		Morgan Berry and Christina Marie Kelly.
May 27–29, 2022	Overland Park Convention Center and Sheraton Overland Park Hotel at the Convention Center; Overland Park, Kansas		Amelie Belcher, Jessica Calvello, Gavin Goszka, Anairis Quiñones, Eric Roth, Strangecat Cosplay, and Kari Wahlgren.
May 26–28, 2023	Overland Park Convention Center and Sheraton Overland Park Hotel at the Convention Center; Overland Park, Kansas		Amelie Belcher, Aaron Campbell, Clifford Chapin, Khoi Dao, Kristen McGuire, Philip "Canvas" Odango, Zeno Robinson, Laura Stahl, Diana "Binkx" Tolin, and Mark Whitten.
May 24–26, 2024	Overland Park Convention Center; Overland Park, Kansas		Bennett Abara, Misako Aoki, Amelie Belcher, Dani Chambers, Jennifer Cihi, Sandy Fox, Heather Gonzalez, Aika Kobayashi, Lex Lang, Briana Lawrence, Kaiji Tang, Diana "Binkx" Tolin, Jessica Walsh, and Anne Yatco.
March 14–16, 2025	Overland Park Convention Center; Overland Park, Kansas		Misako Aoki, A.J. Beckles, Amelie Belcher, Steve Blum, Ray Chase, Robbie Daymond, Yaya Han, Kyle "Turtle Smithy" Mathis, Malinda "Malindachan" Mathis, Brandon McInnis, Misako Rocks!, Max Mittelman, Anairis Quiñones, J. Michael Tatum, and Diana "Binkx" Tolin.
March 13–15, 2026	Overland Park Convention Center; Overland Park, Kansas		Amelie Belcher, Heather Gonzalez, Xanthe Huynh, Hylian Cream, Kirilee, Kazutaka Kodaka, Kyle "Turtle Smithy" Mathis, Malinda "Malindachan" Mathis, PAiDA, Aaron Roberts, Zeno Robinson, Jonah Scott, and Diana "Binkx" Tolin.
