= Overland Park Convention Center =

Mid-sized convention center in the Kansas City area

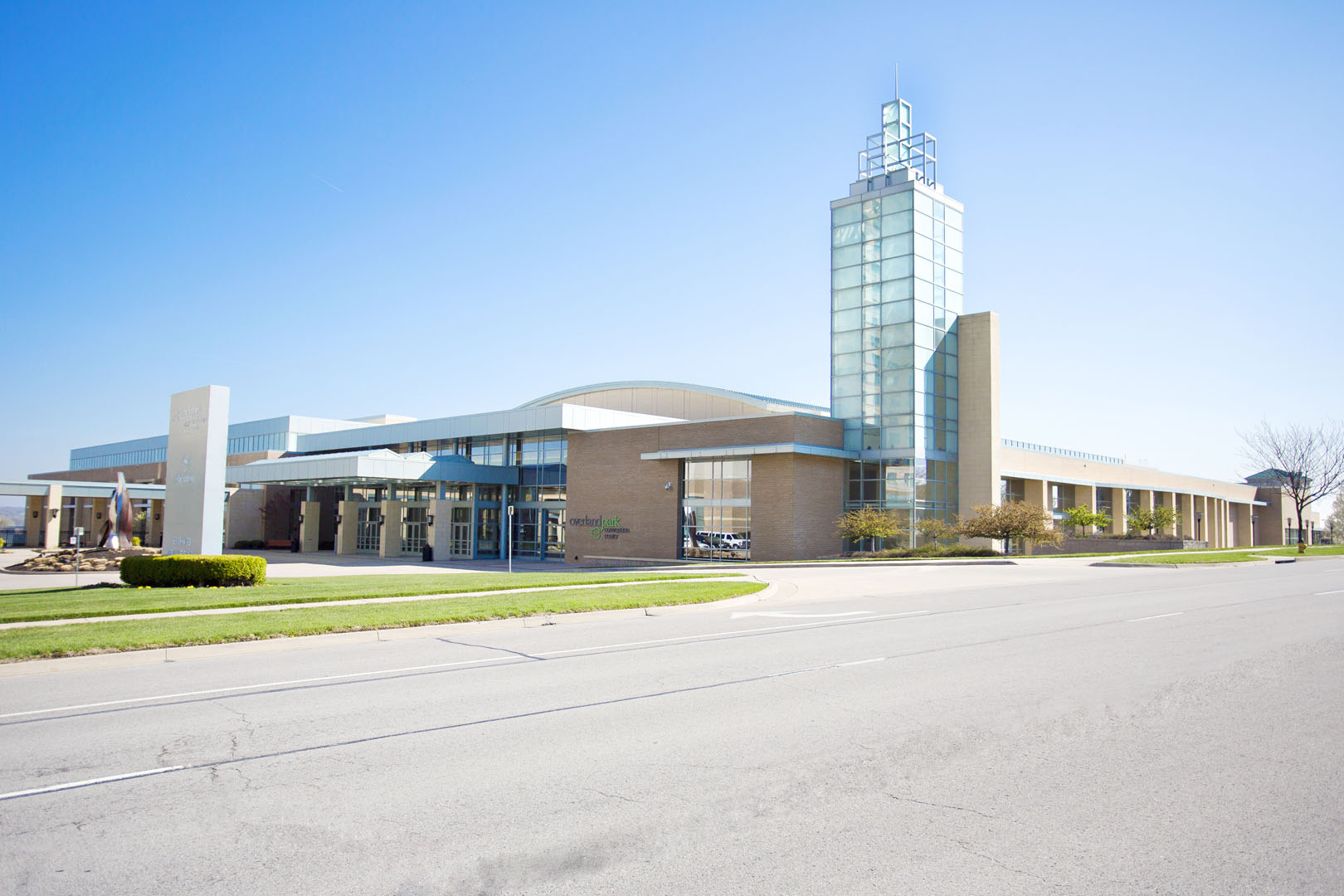
- Interactive map of Overland Park Convention Center
- Location: 6000 College Boulevard; Overland Park, Kansas 66211
- Coordinates: 38°55′42″N 94°39′19″W
- Owner: City of Overland Park, Kansas
- Operator: OVG360

Construction
- Opened: November 17, 2002
- Architect: DLR Group

Tenant
- None

The Overland Park Convention Center was opened in 2002 and hosts on average 200 events each year. It is on a 26-acre (110,000 m^{2}) site in Overland Park, the largest suburb in the Kansas City metropolitan area and the second largest city in Kansas. The mid-sized convention center features a total of 98,500-square-foot (9,150 m^{2}) of exhibit space, including a 60,000-square-foot (5,600 m^{2}) exhibition hall that connects to the 25,000 sq ft (2,300 m^{2}) dividable ballroom. It provides an additional event space of eight meeting rooms, and 40,000 sq ft (3,700 m^{2}) of pre-function space that houses over 75 selected works of art created by Midwestern artists.

== History ==
The idea for a city-owned convention center in Overland Park began in the mid-1980s. A special use permit application for a convention center and hotel on the site was submitted in 1998. Although the planning commission recommended approval, the application was withdrawn and never presented to the city council. In 1999, the City of Overland Park purchased a 26-acre property from Sprint Corporation and retained HVS to do a study on the feasibility of a hotel and convention center on the site, which the firm confirmed it was. The city then worked with architectural firm DLR Group to design the facility. Construction costs were funded through general obligation bonds. The Overland Park Convention Center officially opened on November 17, 2002.

Built alongside the convention center, the connected municipal-owned Sheraton Overland Park Hotel also opened in 2002. The 20-story hotel was built at a cost of $68 million and offers 412 guest rooms and 18 suites.

The center served as a consular services hub during the 2026 FIFA World Cup, providing international visitors in the area with consular support for documentation, travel, and logistics.

== Events ==
The Overland Park Convention Center hosts a variety of events throughout the year, from large consumer shows to dance competitions to conventions to small corporate meetings. Some of the annual events include:

- Johnson County Boat Show
- Johnson County Home and Garden Show
- KC Bridal Spectacular
- Heartland Model Car Nationals
- Missouri District Youth Convention 2006-2012 (United Pentecostal Church International)
- Naka-Kon
- Royals Fan Fest (2009 - 2013)
- Kantcon Tabletop Gaming Convention
