= Exist Trace =

Japanese visual kei rock band

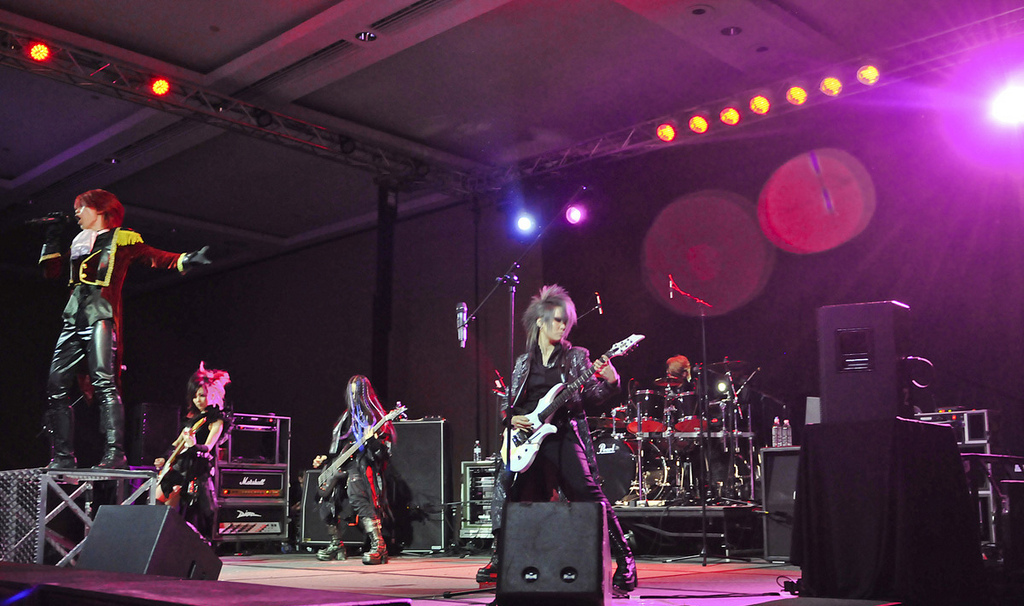
- Exist Trace at Tekkoshocon X in Pittsburgh, 2012

Background information
- Origin: Tokyo, Japan
- Genres: Alternative metal; nu metal; alternative rock; gothic metal; melodic death metal (early)
- Years active: 2003–present
- Labels: Sequence; Monster's Inc.; Tokuma Japan Communications
- Members: Jyou; Naoto; Mally; Miko; Omi
- Website: exist-trace.com

Exist Trace (イグジストトレイス, Iguzisuto Toreisu; stylized as exist†trace) is a Japanese visual kei rock band, consisting entirely of female members. The members originate from Tokyo, and initially formed in June 2003. The founding members are Jyou, Naoto, and Mally, who met Miko and Omi after placing an advertisement for guitarists.

To date, Exist Trace has released four albums, eight EPs, and nine singles. In addition, the band has appeared on eleven compilation albums and three omnibus DVDs, plus their self-released 2012 concert DVD Just Like a Virgin.

Exist Trace made their U.S. debut at Sakura-Con 2011 in Seattle, Washington. On June 15, 2011, they made their major label debut on Tokuma Japan Communications with the EP True. Their song "I Feel You" was featured in Nadeshiko Japan's official 2012 guidebook DVD. Their highest charting release was Virgin, which reached number 84 on the Oricon album chart.

== Biography ==
=== Band members ===
- Lead vocals: Jyou (ジョウ)
- Lead guitar: Omi (乙魅)
- Rhythm guitar, vocals: Miko (ミコ)
- Bass: Naoto (猶人)
- Drums: Mally (マリ)

=== Musical style and direction ===
Exist Trace's early music can be described as melodic death metal, with vocalist Jyou's growls and shouts throughout many songs, which contributes to their dark undertone.

For their 2009 album Vanguard of the Muses, the band collaborated by writing separately for two months before recording. "Each of us would come in with the music and lyrics already written for our own songs. For the recording, we split it into two-week sessions. In each session we’d finish at least two songs, sometimes four. So from start to finish it was maybe three months total," said lead songwriter and guitarist Miko.

They have since added more complex sounds to the compositions, their guitar sound often featuring heavy distortion and technically virtuoso riffs and solos. The lyrics are mainly based on gothic themes, and their music style has resemblance to gothic rock. In recent work, they have experimented with different electronic and melodic approaches to their music, such as the jazz-influenced "Ginger", the electronic rock of "Diamond" and the 1980s disco feel of "Spiral Daisakusen".

=== Career ===
In 2013, Exist Trace introduced their 'new world' musical direction, where long-time main lyricist/composer miko would officially be taking a dual-vocal position with Jyou. The twin vocal style was emphasized on 2013's single "Diamond". In 2014's "Spiral Daisakusen", the pair again share front billing and the center spot on the music video. The first album to fully incorporate the twin vocal style, World Maker (2014), revealed an improved duet system, where vocals are typically heavier towards Jyou in allocation, but making good use of miko's sweeter counterbalance. In 2016, the band released the This Is Now mini-album, which included re-recorded versions of the singles "Twin Wings" and "Shout Out", which had been previously released as live-show-only CDs. In Japan, the This Is Now EP sold out within a day, across such stores as ZEAL LINK, Disk Union and BRAND-X. On July 29, 2020, Exist Trace released the EP The Only Garden. In July 2023, Exist Trace performed a two-date Asian tour titled Midsummer's Night Wish with Ancient Myth and Fate Gear that took them to Hong Kong and Taipei.

=== International acclaim ===
Over time, the band has developed a dedicated international following, largely by word of mouth. In 2008, Exist Trace embarked on a tour of Europe, including the United Kingdom. The band also traveled to the US, playing Japanese culture conventions Sakura-Con in 2011, Tekkoshocon X in 2012, and A-Kon in 2013.

=== Fan club ===
2014 brought the introduction of the band's official international fan club, 'Archangel Diamond', to act as a supplement to the Japanese fan club 'Vanguard'. The club became an active presence on social networks such as Facebook, Twitter and Tumblr, featuring fan artworks and responding to fan questions. It officially opened for membership on May 19, 2014, the 19th of each month being generally used for Exist Trace announcements as it is 'Igu day'/イグの日 (Japanese wordplay on the shortened form of the band's name).

Archangel Diamond promised to connect international fans more closely with the band, and offered fan club exclusive merchandise, special prices on merchandise, monthly newsletters with messages from the band members, and special contests and interactions with the band.

As of late 2017, the club changed its identification to "International Support Team", and ceased paid activities but continues to post English updates.

== Releases ==
=== Albums ===
- Recreation Eve (November 19, 2008)
- Twin Gate (November 3, 2010)
- Virgin (May 23, 2012)
- World Maker (September 24, 2014)
- Neo Japanese Heroine (May 20, 2022) (compilation album)
- Who I Am (November 19, 2025)

=== EPs ===
- Annunciation -The Heretic Elegy- (December 13, 2006)
- Demented Show (September 9, 2007)
- Vanguard -Of the Muses- (April 22, 2009)
- Ambivalent Symphony (October 21, 2009)
- True (June 15, 2011)
- The Last Daybreak (October 19, 2011)
- This is Now (March 16, 2016)
- Royal Straight Magic (November 16, 2016)
- The Only Garden (July 29, 2020)

=== Singles ===
- "Ambivalence" (August 28, 2005)
- "Riot" (July 17, 2006)
- "Funeral Bouquet" (January 10, 2007)
- "Liquid" (July 18, 2007)
- "Knife" (June 2, 2010)
- "Diamond" (July 3, 2013)
- "Spiral Daisakusen" (May 14, 2014)
- "Twin Wings" (April 19, 2015)
- "Shout Out" (July 19, 2015)

=== Demo tapes ===
- "Hai no Yuki" (灰ノ雪, February 22, 2004)
- "Kokumu" (黒霧, July 1, 2004)

=== Omnibuses ===
- Drive Up!! vol. 1 (April 15, 2005) Corrosion
- Summit 03 (November 29, 2006) Mabushii Hodo no Kurayami no Naka de (眩しい程の暗闇の中で)
- Deviant's Struggle (June 20, 2007) liquid
- Fool's Mate Select Omnibus Seduction#1 (December 16, 2007) Sacrifice Baby
- Summit 04 (January 30, 2008) Venom
- Summit 05 (December 10, 2008) Judea
- Shock Edge 2009 (October 14, 2009) Liquid
- Neo Voltage (May 26, 2010) Unforgive You
- Iron Angel (January 15, 2011) Liquid
- Final Summit 2000~2010 (February 16, 2011) Mabushii Hodo no Kurayami no Naka de (眩しい程の暗闇の中で)
- Mariannes (July 20, 2011) Liquid

=== DVDs ===
- Silent Hill 2061125 Pavilion which deer barks (January 31, 2007) SACRIFICE BABY
- 0704272930 (September 18, 2007) Lilin/JUDEA
- Visual-kei DVD Magazine vol.4 V-Rock Special (March 31, 2010)
- Just Like a Virgin One Man Show (Shibuya O-WEST 23 June 2012)
