= Young Guitar Magazine =

Japanese music magazine

Young Guitar Magazine is a Japanese guitar magazine first published in May 1969 by Shinko Ongaku Shuppansha (now Shinko Music Entertainment). At its inception, the magazine had a heavy focus on folk music. In the 1970s it began covering hard rock, and in the 1980s it leaned more towards guitar virtuosos, featuring acts from the heavy metal and progressive rock genres. The magazine's lead editor was particularly impressed by Van Halen's debut album from 1978, and took that as a sign that bands like it would be the next sensation in rock music.
