= Luke Takamura =

Japanese musician (born 1964)

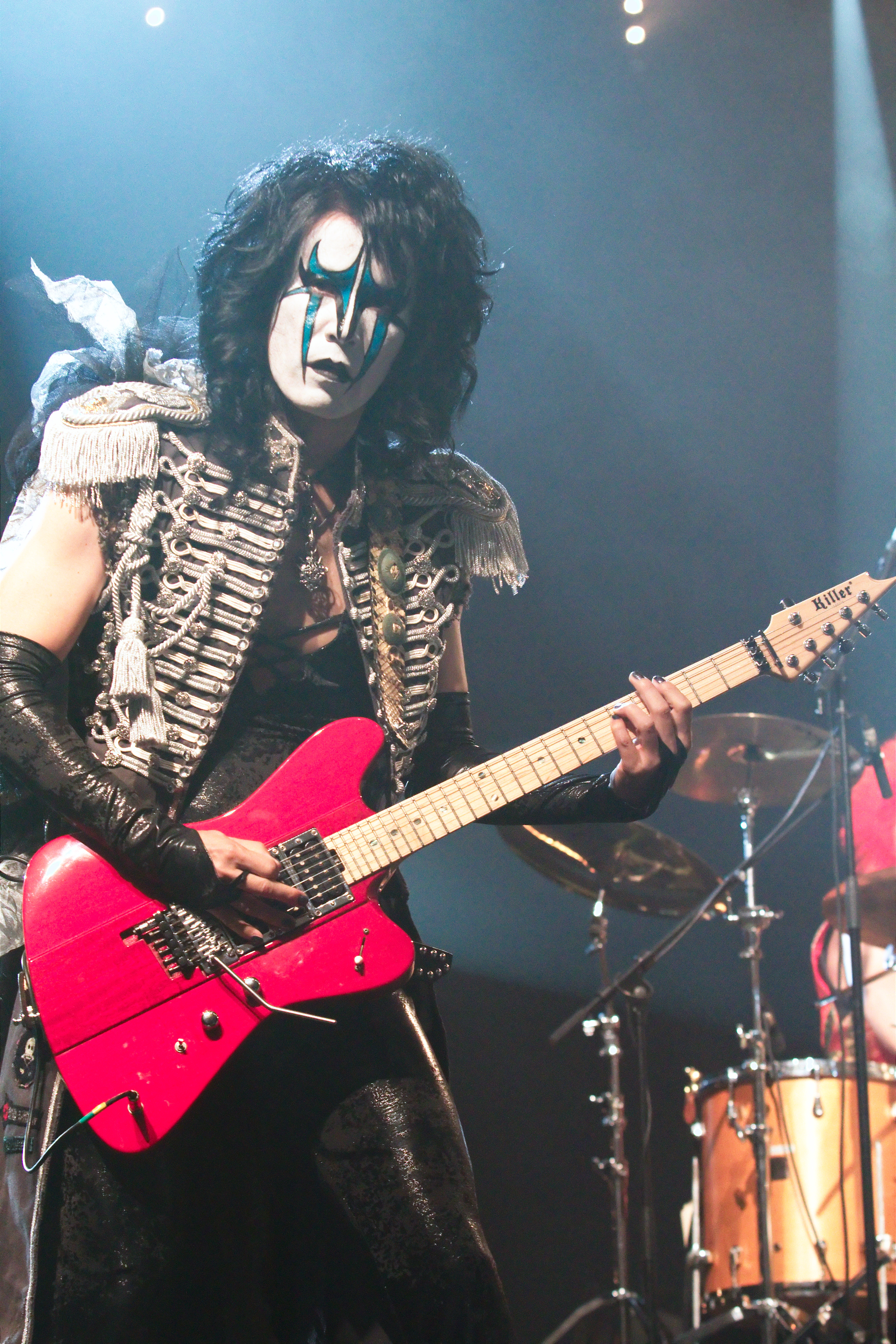
- Takamura, as his character in Seikima-II, at Japan Expo 2010.

Background information
- Also known as: Sgt. Luke Takamura III (Sgt.ルーク篁III世)
- Born: April 12, 1964 (age 62); Hibarigaoka, Nishitōkyō, Japan
- Genres: Rock, hard rock, heavy metal
- Occupations: Musician, songwriter
- Instruments: Guitar, vocals, piano
- Years active: 1984–present
- Member of: Seikima-II

Luke Takamura (Japanese: ルーク篁, Hepburn: Rūku Takamura; born April 12, 1964) is a Japanese musician, singer, and songwriter. He is best known as guitarist of the heavy metal band Seikima-II from 1987 to 1999, and for various temporary reunions since. From 2002 to 2020, he was the lead singer and guitarist of the rock trio Canta. Luke was voted the tenth greatest Japanese guitarist in a 2019 poll held by goo. He has cited Yuji Adachi, Steve Vai, Eddie Van Halen and Kazumi Watanabe as guitar influences. In 2018, readers and professional musicians voted Takamura the fifth best guitarist in the history of hard rock and heavy metal in We Rock magazine's "Metal General Election".

== Career ==
Luke joined Seikima-II in February 1987, replacing guitarist Jail O'Hashi. Like the other members, Luke adopted the stage persona of an Akuma ("demon") from the futuristic hyper-evolved dimension Makai ("demon world"), where he was the former Staff General of Military Authorities. They all wear face paint and elaborate stage outfits. The band preaches a demonic religion called Akumakyō through heavy metal music to conquer the Earth. Luke released nine studio albums with them, and is their most credited songwriter. In accordance to their fictional "prophecy" and after completing their "world conquest", Seikima-II disbanded at the end of the century on December 31, 1999 at 23:59:59. They sold over 10 million records, and have had limited time-reunions in 2005, 2010, and 2015.

While still in Seikima-II, Luke released a solo album in 1991. In 1995 he joined the short-lived supergroup Kings, with Shuichi Aoiki (Night Hawks) on vocals, Taiji Sawada (X, Loudness) on bass and Satoshi "Joe" Miyawaki (44 Magnum, Spread Beaver) on drums. He released the instrumental album A Sight For Sore Eyes in 2001 under the name TOYO (Totally Oval Yellow Outbreak). The following year, Luke formed the rock band Canta with Seikima-II drummer Raiden Yuzawa and Animetal bassist Masaki. After 18 years, Canta disbanded in 2020 after a farewell tour.

Since 2007, Luke has supported Toshihiko Takamizawa of The Alfee both in the studio and in live performances. Their group of guitarists is called Ōji Rengō (王子連合) and also includes Anchang (Sex Machineguns) and Koji (La'cryma Christi). Luke contributed to Masatoshi Ono's 2011 album The Voice -Stand Proud!-, playing guitar on covers of Airplay's "Stranded" and "Open Arms" by Journey. In 2016, he provided guitar to the songs "We Are!" from Blizzard of Animetal the Second by Animetal the Second and "Chateau de Sable" from Fate by Mary's Blood.

Luke composed and recorded "Breath of Fire -Tsuioku no 1-Byō-" (Breath of Fire -追憶の1秒-) to be used as the theme song of J Sports' broadcasts of cycling events. It was released digitally on July 22, 2026.

== Discography ==
Solo

- Takamura (篁) (1991), Oricon Albums Chart Peak Position: No. 25
- Soaking Wet Live (1993) No. 49
- A Sight For Sore Eyes (2001) – credited to TOYO

With Seikima-II

- Big Time Changes (1987)
- The Outer Mission (1988)
- Yuugai (1990)
- Kyoufu no Restaurant (1992)
- Ponk!! (1994)
- Mephistopheles no Shouzou (1996)
- News (1997)
- Move (1998)
- Living Legend (1999)

With Kings

- Kings (1995) No. 36

With Canta

- Everything's Gonna Be Alright (2002)
- Fraction (2003)
- Non-Homogenized (2005)
- Hyakka Sōmei (百歌颯鳴) (2006) No. 240
- Ryuusei to Haru no Arashi (流星と春の嵐) (2007) No. 96
- Kirakira (きらきら) (2008) No. 154
- Meramera (めらめら) (2008) No. 160
- Green Horn (2009) No. 123
- Miracle (2011)
- Seven (セヴン) (2012) No. 133
- My Generator (2013) No. 116
- Love Fixxxer (2016) No. 68
- Kurakura (くらくら) (2017) No. 95
- Did I Make It? (2019) No. 81
