= Fate Gear =

Japanese metal band

- Origin: Tokyo, Japan
- Genres: Heavy metal; Power metal; Hard rock
- Years active: 2015–present
- Labels: Marianne, Steam Steel
- Members: Mina; Nana; Erika; Haruka
- Past members: Nico; Sakae; Hiro; Kurumi; Nino; Yuri
- Website: http://fategear.jp/

Fate Gear (stylized as FATE GEAR) is a Japanese female heavy metal band from Tokyo, formed in 2015 by guitarist Mina.

== History ==
Five months after leaving Destrose due to ongoing health issues, guitarist Mina announced the formation of Fate Gear with vocalist Nico in July 2015. Joined by guest bassist Sakae and guest drummer Hiro, the band made its live debut on August 1, 2015, at Meguro Rock-May-Kan. Their debut album, A Light in the Black, was released on August 12 and includes a re-recorded Destrose song.

In May 2016, Kurumi Fujioka from the band Mysterious Priestess joined Fate Gear as keyboardist. However, Hiro had her last performance with the band on May 28.

They released their second album Oz -Rebellion- on June 21, 2017, via their own record label, Steam Steel Records. Its opening track was arranged by former Terra Rosa keyboardist Masashi Okagaki.

Fate Gear's third album 7 Years Ago was released on April 11, 2018, and includes Mina's past project Arch Roses's song "Fenixx 2011". It also features several guest vocalists and musicians.

The EP Headless Goddess was released on January 9, 2019, and is composed almost entirely of re-recorded Destrose songs. Once again, Fate Gear collaborated with several guest vocalists on the EP.

The collaborations continued with their January 13, 2021, album, The Sky Prison. The EP Scars in my Life -English Edition- followed just days later on January 27. In July 2023, Fate Gear performed a two-date Asian tour titled Midsummer's Night Wish with Ancient Myth and Exist Trace that took them to Hong Kong and Taipei.

Their 2015 released song Megabullets from their first album was featured in an episode of the Netflix anime series Kengan Ashura. Fate Gear toured throughout Europe several times.

== Band members ==
Current

- Captain Mina (Mina隊長, Mina Taichō) – guitar (2015–present)
- Nana – vocals (2018–present)
- Erika – bass (2016–2021, 2022–present)
- Haruka – drums (2016–present)
- Kurosaki – keyboards (2022–present)

Former

- Nico – vocals (2015–2018)
- Sakae (さかえ) – bass (2015–2016)
- Nino – bass (2021–2022)
- Hiro – drums (2015–2016)
- Lumina – keyboards (2015–2016)
- Kurumi – keyboards (2016–2017)
- Yuri – keyboards (2017–2022)

Timeline

== Guest musicians ==
Fate Gear has worked with various guest musicians over the years for their album releases and Live performances.

Current

- Nana (Theo Nova, tour member of Fate Gear overseas concerts) – vocals
- Junna (Hagane, tour member of Fate Gear overseas concerts) – drums
- Ibuki (ex-Disqualia) – vocals
- Maki Oyama (solo singer, AcoMetal) – vocals

Former

- Manami (Innocent Material, Dragon Eyes) – vocals
- Ibara (Emille's Moonlight Serenade) – vocals
- Rami (ex-Aldious) – vocals
- Maiko (Jade Forest Company, My complex of Academy) – vocals
- Jill (Unlucky Morpheus) – violin
- Yashiro (Headless Goddess music video) – guitar
- Maki (DraiN) – bass

== Discography ==
Fate Gear discography
- Studio albums: 4
- EPs: 6
- Video albums: 2

Studio albums

Title	Album details	Peak chart positions
Title	Album details	JPN Oricon
A Light in the Black	Released: August 12, 2015	260
Oz -Rebellion-	Released: June 21, 2017	221
7 Years Ago	Released: April 11, 2018	144
The Sky Prison	Released: January 13, 2021	126

EPs

Title	Album details	Peak chart positions
Title	Album details	JPN Oricon
Headless Goddess	Released: January 9, 2019	149
Scars in My Life -English Edition-	Released: January 27, 2021	191
Killers in the Sky	Released: April 27, 2022	171
Killers in the Sky Part 2	Released: November 9, 2022	
The Vanguard of Hades	Released: April 27, 2024	
Kill the Shadow King	Released: December 18, 2024	

Video albums

Title	Album details	Peak chart positions
Title	Album details	JPN Oricon DVDs
Oz -Rebellion- Release Tour Final!	Released: October 25, 2017	178
Live at amHall Osaka	Released: February 25, 2022	
