= Mary's Blood =

Japanese all-female heavy metal band

- Origin: Tokyo, Japan
- Genres: Heavy metal; power metal
- Years active: 2009–2022 (hiatus)
- Labels: Future/Nippon Columbia; Victor; Tokuma Japan; JPU; Sliptrick
- Spinoff of: Destrose
- Members: Eye; Mari; Rio; Saki
- Past members: Chiba; Niboshi; Eri

Mary's Blood (Japanese: メアリーズブラッド, Hepburn: Mearīzu Buraddo) was a Japanese all-female heavy metal band from Tokyo, formed in 2009 by four former members of Destrose. It consists of vocalist Eye, drummer Mari, bassist Rio and guitarist Saki since 2012. After releasing three EPs as an independent band, they signed to Nippon Columbia for their first album, Countdown to Evolution (2014). Mary's Blood then switched to Victor Entertainment for the release of Bloody Palace (2015) and Fate (2016). They signed to Tokuma Japan Communications in 2018 and released three further studio albums, including their highest-charting, Confessions (2019). Mary's Blood began an indefinite hiatus on April 9, 2022.

== History ==
=== 2009–2017: Formation and major label debut ===
After the breakup of Destrose on New Year's Eve 2008, vocalist Eye, guitarist Eri, bassist Niboshi (formerly known as "Kayo"), and drummer Mari later regrouped and recruited guitarist Chiba to form Mary's Blood in December 2009. They are named after the "Bloody Mary" cocktail and its namesake, Queen Mary I of England. Although the band's name has always been written in English the same way, its members did not pronounce the "s" in Japanese until making their major label debut. They released their debut single "Save the Queen" on December 20. Their first EP, 0-Zero, was published on June 8, 2011. The single "Last Game" followed on November 28 and placed on Oricon's main chart despite being an independent band. In 2012, Chiba, Niboshi and Eri all left Mary's Blood in quick succession. Bassist Rio joined shortly before Saki, another Destrose alumni, was recruited as guitarist in July 2012 following an audition, completing the band's final lineup. Four months later, they released the EP Scarlet in November 2012.

Mary's Blood performed their first international show in Houston, Texas at Anime Matsuri in March 2013. Their third EP, Azure, was released on July 10, 2013 and reached number 17 on the Oricon indies chart. The band signed with major record label Nippon Columbia and released their first album Countdown to Evolution on August 20, 2014. Its song "Marionette" was the ending theme of the TV Kanagawa show Mutoma. Readers of heavy metal magazine Burrn! voted Mary's Blood second place in its best newcomer category, "Marionette" seventh in the music category, and Countdown to Evolution 15th in the album category. Despite being on a major label, touring is organized by a band's management agency and Mary's Blood did not have one, so Mari continued to be in charge of booking gigs and their finances. The band sold out their first solo tour, Tour Act 1: Countdown to Evolution. They were the opening act for Marty Friedman on September 25, 2014, and for Secret Sphere and Ego Fall on January 12, 2015. Mary's Blood performed at 2015's Naon no Yaon festival, a rock festival held by Show-Ya that features only female bands. They also opened for DragonForce in Hong Kong on August 30, 2015. The band switched labels to Victor Entertainment, released their second album Bloody Palace on October 7, and began the Invasion of Queen tour on October 17, 2015.

Mary's Blood hosted the Grand Cross Tour 2016, where they performed with a different act at each concert. On April 16 they played with thrash metal band Outrage, singer Nanase Aikawa joined them the following day, and Show-Ya frontwoman Keiko Terada performed with them on May 3. They released their third album Fate on October 26, 2016. It features collaborations with Seikima-II guitarist Luke Takamura, Show-Ya guitarist Miki "Sun-go" Igarashi, Kuroyume bassist Hitoki, and producer Yuyoyuppe. According to Saki, Fate remains the band's best-selling album. They supported it with the Change the Fate tour that began on October 28, and ended on January 22, 2017, with Sun-go and Hitoki as guests. Before the album's release, Mary's Blood had signed a management deal with Masterworks Corporation, which made touring larger venues easier. British record label JPU Records released Bloody Palace and Fate in Europe on August 18, 2017, while Fate (August 29, 2017) and Bloody Palace (October 17, 2017) were released in North America by Sliptrick Records.

=== 2018–2022: Tokuma Japan and hiatus ===
After switching labels to Tokuma Japan Communications, Mary's Blood released their fourth album Revenant on April 18, 2018. Around this time, Saki was involved in an unspecified criminal act and the subsequent trouble related to it took a toll on her mental state. At the same time, disagreements in musical direction appeared in the band, which furthered her mental exhaustion to the point she told their agency she could not continue in the summer of 2018. The agency accommodated her, which included talks of a project that would later lead to the formation of Nemophila, and she said this alleviated her mental stress and allowed her to continue in the band. Mary's Blood's next album Confessions was released in Japan on June 12, 2019, and became their highest-charting to date. It was released in Europe on October 4. That same day, Mary's Blood played their first show in Europe as the headliner of Metal Matsuri in London at the O2 Academy Islington. The band's Conceptual Tour was scheduled to take place in May 2020, but was postponed until August and September due to the COVID-19 pandemic in Japan. Re>Animator, a cover album of heavy metal versions of anime theme songs, was released on August 26, 2020. It features songs such as "Forever Love", "Magia", "Driver's High" and "Pegasus Fantasy". The last is sung as a duet with its original singer NoB, who had been Eye's vocal coach for the last 10 years.

Around the time they were live-streaming concerts without an audience due to COVID-19, the members of Mary's Blood discussed leaving Masterworks due to a strained-relationship, but, because they did not want to manage everything themselves again, they instead decided to take a break. In her autobiography, Saki wrote that some members wanted to continue, but others did not. Although she personally felt they should disband since there were no plans to resume activities in the near future, she understood the sentiment that it was "important that the band's name lives on", thus they chose to go on hiatus.

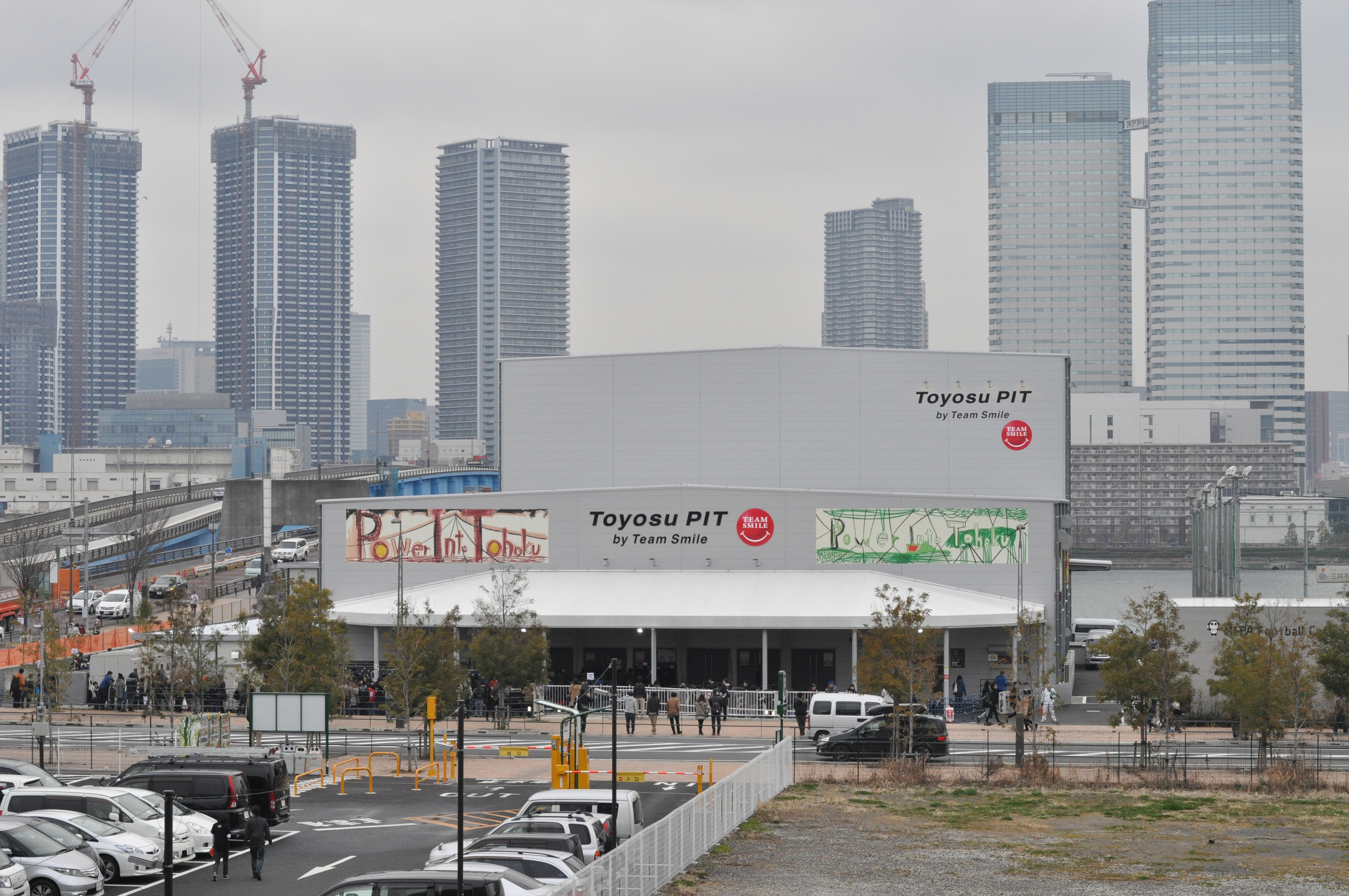
Mary's Blood played their last concert before the hiatus at Toyosu Pit on April 9, 2022.

In 2021, the band held the Kōtetsu Densetsu tour which featured special guests; Kentaro (ex-Gargoyle) on August 28, Masatoshi Ono on September 23, and Shingo☆ (Sex Machineguns) on October 23. Mary's Blood released their self-titled sixth studio album on September 29, 2021. Produced by Yorimasa Hisatake (producer of Galneryus), the band members described it as a return to their heavy metal origins. It was supported by the three-date Blow Up Our Fire Tour from November 13 to December 11.

On December 16, Mary's Blood publicly announced that they would be going on indefinite hiatus in April 2022. The band apologized for the sudden announcement and explained that they decided to have a "recharging period" for the members to grow further and said that when they restart activities, they hope to deliver the music of Mary's Blood in a "more evolved form". Following two concerts titled The Final Day in Osaka on March 23 and Nagoya on March 24, the indefinite hiatus began after an April 9, 2022 concert at Tokyo's Toyosu Pit titled Mary's Blood The Final Day ~Countdown to Evolution~. The final concert was recorded and released on home video on July 30.

Following the hiatus, Saki continued to play in the band Nemophila until 2024, while Mari directed her focus to making drumming videos for her YouTube channel. Rio and Eye both began solo careers, the former under the name "Yako Ikuta" (生田弥子). In 2023, Mari began her own solo career and rejoined the thrash metal band Crucified, while Saki joined Like-an-Angel, a L'Arc-en-Ciel cover band formed by Tetsuya. In 2026, Mari formed Heavy Metal Princess Academy with Cyntia guitarist Yui and Aldious bassist Sawa. Produced by Earthshaker frontman Marcy, it is a musical collective created to foster heavy metal vocalists from young female singers unfamiliar with the genre. Although the multiple vocalists might depart eventually, the three instrumentalists are intended to be a permanent fixture.

== Musical style and songwriting ==
Saki described Mary's Blood as a straight heavy metal band, but because they have many different styles of songs, she feels free to make whatever sounds she wants with them. From the beginning of the group, Mari and Eye have consciously aimed to have vocal melodies that are catchy and easy for Japanese people to listen to. Saki stated that while their music is also consumed internationally, the band mainly thinks about Japanese listeners, and said it is hard to find a balance between the pop things and the heavy metal things as a member. The guitarist explained that Eye and Rio love visual kei music, which sometimes makes it difficult for her to find the tones to match the vocals in songs that they compose. Both Eye and Rio wanted to be in bands because of L'Arc-en-Ciel, Mari started playing music because of X Japan, and Saki was inspired to become a musician by Seikima-II.

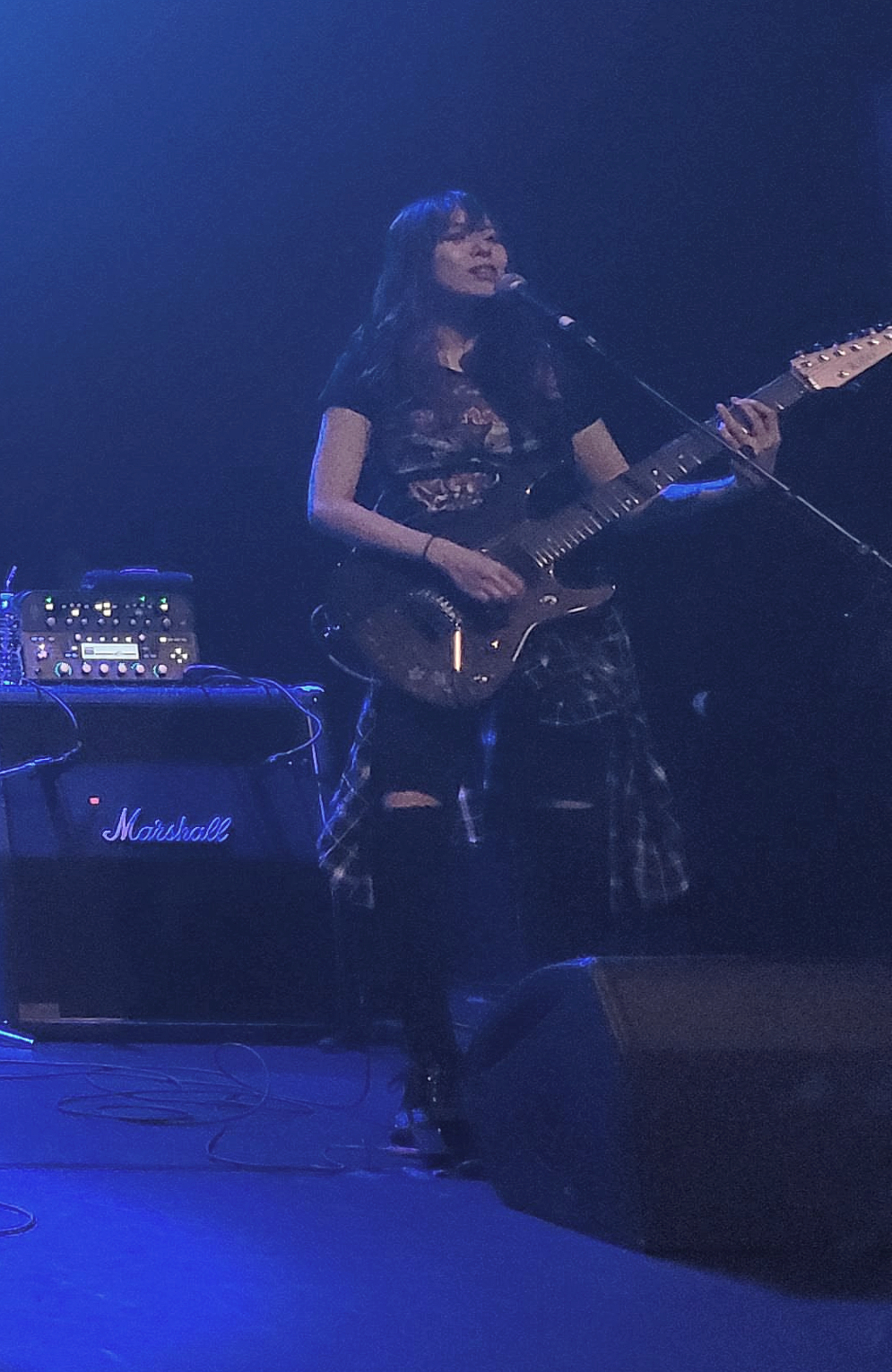
Saki is the principal composer of music in the band.

Guitarist Eri was the main composer of songs in the initial lineup of Mary's Blood. Since joining in 2012, guitarist Saki has taken over this role. When writing for the band, she composes practically everything in the song, except for some drum fills that Mari comes up with. When vocalist Eye composes songs, she does so on piano because she can not play guitar. Rio has stated that the other members write the "so-called good songs", so the bassist believes she is responsible for bringing a different element via her own compositions. For example, "High 5" came from her love of punk rock, while "Hello" was inspired by "Dancing Queen". Eye is the main lyricist, and she writes them after receiving the melody from whoever wrote the song. The singer said that while there are times she would like to use English because it sounds cool, Japanese words have multiple meanings and sometimes conveying meaning is more important. Because she usually writes the lyrics, Eye also normally suggests the track order of albums based on their stories.

Mary's Blood's second and third EPs, Scarlet and Azure, had the themes "red" and "blue" respectively. Because Scarlet had many straightforward hard rock and heavy metal songs, Saki said she wanted to add other elements to Azure and so composed the fast tune "Veronica" and the progressive rock-influenced "Frozen". Mari described their debut album Countdown to Evolution as emphasizing "heaviness and speed", while Saki said they intended it to be their "most intense and technical" record up to that point. Eye believes that the various guest musicians and arrangers on Fate provided a range of different sounds for the album. For example, Yuyoyuppe's composition "Angel's Ladder" marks the first time Saki and Rio had ever played a seven-string guitar and five-string bass respectively. Eye said the recording environment for Revenant was totally different from those of their previous three albums, and explained its title was meant to mean the band was "reborn and starting over" while retaining their good qualities. Saki believes the album has a variety of different songs, explaining that for "World's End" she went with a typical modern metal sound and tone, but used an old school sound for "On the Rocks". Their next album, Confessions, is a concept album centered on the theme of "darkness". Because the band believes there are many different kinds of darkness, some songs sound cheerful on the surface, but their content is "quite depressing". After working with a belly dancer on their tour for the previous album, the Middle Eastern music that was used inspired "Laylah". Mary's Blood's sixth album is self-titled and has the concept of "heavy metal" with the intention of returning to their roots. Because of the theme, they asked Yorimasa Hisatake (known for his work with Galneryus and Animetal) to produce.

Yashiro supported Mary's Blood at live performances as second guitarist since July 2014. Saki explained that continuously employing the same support guitarist is more efficient than using different ones as it cuts down on the need for rehearsals. She also said that Yashiro does not join as a full member due to her schedule with many different projects, while Yashiro herself stated she does not join in order to keep "the balance" between Mary's Blood's four members.

== Members ==
Current members

- Eye – vocals (2009–2022)
- Mari – drums, bandleader (2009–2022)
- Rio – bass guitar, backing vocals (2012–2022)
- Saki – guitar, backing vocals (2012–2022)

Support member

- Yashiro – guitar, backing vocals (2014–2022)

Former members

- Chiba – guitar, backing vocals (2009–2012)
- Niboshi – bass, backing vocals (2009–2012)
- Eri – guitar, backing vocals (2009–2012)

== Discography ==
Mary's Blood discography
- Studio albums: 6
- EPs: 3
- Compilation albums: 1
- Singles: 2
- Video albums: 8
- Cover: 1

=== Studio albums ===
| Title | Album details | Peak chart positions | | |
| Title | Album details | JPN Oricon | JPN Billboard Hot | JPN Billboard Top |
|---|---|---|---|---|
| Countdown to Evolution | Released: August 20, 2014; Label: Nippon Columbia | 26 | — | 23 |
| Bloody Palace | Released: October 7, 2015; Label: Victor Entertainment | 25 | 38 | 25 |
| Fate | Released: October 26, 2016; Label: Victor Entertainment | 23 | 33 | 21 |
| Revenant | Released: April 18, 2018; Label: Tokuma Japan Communications | 21 | 34 | 18 |
| Confessions | Released: June 12, 2019; Label: Tokuma Japan Communications | 19 | 29 | 18 |
| Mary's Blood | Released: September 29, 2021; Label: Tokuma Japan Communications | 23 | 23 | 22 |
"—" denotes a recording released before the creation of the Hot Albums chart.

=== EPs ===
| Title | Album details | Peak chart positions |
| Title | Album details | JPN Oricon |
|---|---|---|
| 0-Zero | Released: June 8, 2011; Label: R.J Records | — |
| Scarlet | Released: November 21, 2012; Label: Naked Sound | — |
| Azure | Released: July 10, 2013; Label: Naked Sound | 195 |
"—" denotes a recording that did not chart.

=== Cover albums ===
| Title | Album details | Peak chart positions | | |
| Title | Album details | JPN Oricon | JPN Billboard Hot | JPN Billboard Top |
|---|---|---|---|---|
| Re>Animator | Released: August 26, 2020; Label: Tokuma Japan Communications | 34 | 56 | 37 |

=== Compilation albums ===
| Title | Album details | Peak chart positions | | |
| Title | Album details | JPN Oricon | JPN Billboard Hot | JPN Billboard Top |
|---|---|---|---|---|
| Queen's Legacy | Released: April 6, 2022; Label: Tokuma Japan Communications | 37 | 54 | 32 |

=== Singles ===
| Title | Year | Peak chart positions |
| Title | Year | JPN Oricon |
|---|---|---|
| "Save the Queen": Released: December 20, 2009; Label: Ander Luce | 2009 | — |
| "Last Game": Released: November 28, 2011; Label: R.J Records | 2011 | 198 |
"—" denotes a recording that did not chart.

=== Video albums ===
| Title | Details | Peak chart positions | |
| Title | Details | JPN Oricon DVDs | JPN Oricon Blu-rays |
|---|---|---|---|
| My Last Game | Released: March 2012 | — | — |
| Scarlet ~ 2012 Live at O-West | Released: April 10, 2013 | — | — |
| Live at Blaze ~ Invasion of Queen Tour 2015-2016 Final | Released: April 13, 2016 | 14 | — |
| Live at Liquid Room ~Change the Fate Tour 2016-2017~ | Released: May 10, 2017 | 35 | 22 |
| Live at Intercity Hall ~Flag of the Queendom~ | Released: May 23, 2018 | 41 | 41 |
| Live at Blitz ~Make the New World 2018~ | Released: October 24, 2018 | 54 | 70 |
| Mary's Blood 10th Anniversary Box | Released: February 14, 2020 | — | — |
| The Final Day ~Countdown to Evolution~ 2022 at Toyosu Pit | Released: July 30, 2022 | — | — |
"—" denotes a recording that did not chart.
