= Twin Gate =

Studio album by Exist Trace
- Released: December 15, 2010
- Length: 37:45
- Label: Monster's Inc.

Exist Trace studio album chronology
Recreation Eve (2008)	Twin Gate (2010)	Virgin (2012)

Singles from Twin Gate
- 1. "KNIFE"

TWIN GATE is Exist Trace's first studio album. Many of the songs on the album had been previously released on EPs.

== Songs ==
1. DECIDE
2. Orleans no Shoujo (オルレアンの少女)
3. KNIFE (Album mix)
4. Neverland
5. RESONANCE
6. VANGUARD
7. Blaze
8. unforgive you
9. Owari no nai Sekai (終わりのない世界)
10. Cradle

== Singles ==
- Knife (released June 2, 2010)
