= Destrose =

Japanese all-female heavy metal band

- Origin: Tokyo, Japan
- Genres: Heavy metal
- Years active: 2007–2015
- Labels: Marianne, Flying Cat
- Past members: See members

Destrose was a Japanese heavy metal band formed in 2007. The group remained an independent band their entire career and experienced frequent line-up changes until going on indefinite hiatus in 2015. Although considered pioneers of the Girls Metal Band Boom, Destrose never achieved commercial success and is best known for the subsequent bands later formed by its many members.

== History ==
=== 2006–2012: Formation and singles ===
Guitarist and bandleader Mina formed a cover band named Destroya in 2006. She derived its name from Kiss' album Destroyer and the Godzilla character Destoroyah. They performed songs by acts such as Led Zeppelin, Show-Ya, Pantera, Metallica and Manowar. Mina then formed Destrose in 2007, including "rose" in the name to make it more feminine and in reference to Guns N' Roses. After their first concert in March, Mina, vocalist Eye and bassist Kayo produced a demo CD in April, and recruited guitarist Eri and support drummer Mari in November. Destrose contributed the song "Headless Goddess" to the November 2008 compilation album Samurai Metal Vol. 4, and released the demo CD "Hakai no Bara" in December. However, Eye, Kayo, Eri and Mari all left the band on New Year's Eve 2008 and went on to form Mary's Blood at the end of 2009. In order to have a twin-guitar lineup, Saki was invited to join as guitarist via Mixi towards the end of 2009. According to her, bandleader Mina insisted each member's stage name be two moji (文字; 'characters') long. With a lineup of Mina, Saki, vocalist Mary, bassist Ami and drummer Emi, Destrose was the opening act for The Iron Maidens' Japanese tour in January 2010. Mary and Saki left sometime after the Woman's Power Vol. 48 ~Osaka Edition~ event that March, and were later replaced by Akane and Satty, respectively. In her 10 months with the band, Saki estimated they played three to four times a month, experienced many member changes, including five or six different vocalists, and recorded a single song that she only played a guitar solo on. Before the release of their debut single "Hakai no Bara" on October 2, a second pressing was already decided due to excessive demand.

Destrose's song "Skykiller" was included on the January 15, 2011 compilation Iron Angel in preparation for their January 22 performance at the two-day Iron Angel Live event alongside other female metal acts such as Ancient Myth, Taia and Dazzle Vision. With the departures of Akane and Emi in March, the band recruited vocalist Nene and drummer Nana. Nene was also a fortuneteller and would give tarot card readings at concerts. The single "Deathless Memories" was released on May 25 and reached number 8 on Oricon's independent singles chart. Destrose announced they would temporary suspend activities after their September 25 concert at Meguro Live Station and that it would be their last with Satty, Nene and Nana. Ami also left and briefly reunited with Akane to form the band Pinkish Crown. Bassist Miho joined Destrose on November 11. Marina joined about a week later and would become their longest serving vocalist. Guitarist Hanako also joined that month.

Destrose resumed activities after the January 9, 2012 Women's Power 20th Anniversary concert, where they played alongside Show-Ya, Aldious and Babymetal. Two days later, drummer Haruna officially joined the band. The band signed with Flying Cat Records and released "Fenixx -To Revive-" on March 28, which reached number 7 on the indie chart. Its title is not only a reference to the band resuming, but also refers to Japan's recovery from the March 2011 Great East Japan Earthquake. After the departure of Hanako, guitarist Narumi officially joined the band on June 1. The single "Nostphilia", coined by combining "nostalgia" and "philia", was released on November 14.

=== 2013–2015: Studio album and hiatus ===
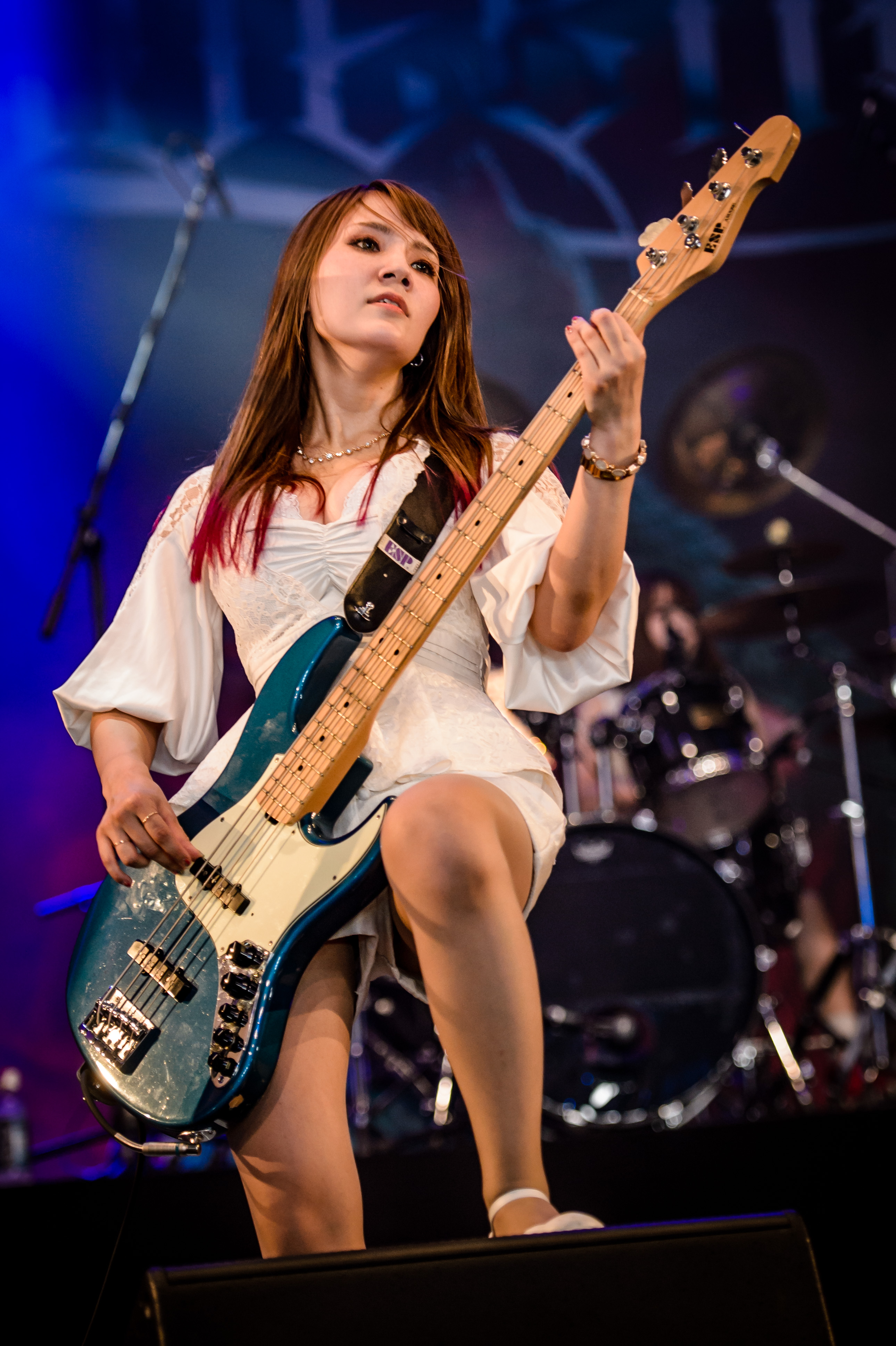
As bassist from 2011 to 2015, Miho was the second-longest serving member of the band.

The band's only studio album, the self-titled Destrose, was released on April 10, 2013 and supported by a fourteen-date Japanese tour that ended with their first one-man concert on June 1 at Meguro Live Station. It reached number seven on Oricon's indie albums chart. They were the only indie band at Show-Ya's female artists-only Naon no Yaon 2013 festival on April 29, which also included Scandal and Cyntia among others. Destrose performed in the US for the first time in early August as part of Tokyo in Tulsa. The double A-side single "Rin / Maze" was released on November 13 and reached number 7 on the indie chart. To celebrate, they held a one-man concert at Shibuya O-West that same day, which was recorded and later released as a concert video. Later that month, Mina announced she was taking a hiatus from live activities due to health issues.

In March 2014, Destrose performed in the US again at Naka-Kon. Soon after Marina left and formed Mardelas, with Lisa replacing her on April 25. The mini-album, The Prologue was released on September 24 and reached number 5 on the indie chart. Each member wrote a song for the record, which was supported by an eleven-date nationwide tour. Drummer Haruna left the band after her farewell concert on December 24 at Meguro Rock-May-Kan due to her upcoming marriage.

Risa☆Risa joined as drummer on January 30, 2015, and had her first Destrose concert the following day. In February, leader and sole constant member Mina left the band due to her ongoing health issues. At the same time Lisa went on hiatus to treat vocal cord nodules, with Ibuki filling in as guest vocalist. In May, Destrose announced that they would be going on indefinite hiatus in July. They played their final concert, titled Persistence of Rose, at Meguro The Live Station in Tokyo on July 18, 2015.

Also in July 2015, Mina formed the steampunk metal band Fate Gear. Their debut album A Light in the Black, released the following month, and their third album, 2018's 7 Years Ago, both include re-recordings of Destrose songs. Their 2019 EP Headless Goddess is composed almost entirely of re-recorded Destrose songs and features guest vocalists, including Ibuki. In September 2015, Narumi and Risa☆Risa formed Disqualia with Ibuki. Miho and Haruna formed Lovebites in 2016 and recorded the unreleased Destrose song "Bravehearted" for their 2017 debut, The Lovebites EP.

== Band members ==
- Eye – vocals (2007–2008)
- Kayo – bass (2007–2008)
- Eri – guitar (2007–2008)
- Mari – drums (2007–2008)
- Saki – guitar (2009–2010)
- Mary – vocals (2009–2010)
- Ami – bass (2009–2011)
- Emi – drums (2009–2011)
- Akane – vocals (2010–2011)
- Satty – guitar (2010–2011)
- Nene (音々) – vocals (2011)
- Nana – drums (2011)
- Hanako (華子) – guitar (2011–2012)
- Marina – vocals (2011–2014)
- Haruna – drums (2012–2014)
- Captain Mina (Mina隊長, Mina Taichō) – guitar (2007–2015)
- Miho – bass (2011–2015)
- Narumi (成美) – guitar (2012–2015)
- Lisa (里彩, Risa) – vocals (2014–2015)
- Risa☆Risa – drums (2015)

Timeline

== Discography ==
Destrose discography
- Studio albums: 1
- Compilation albums: 1
- Singles: 5
- Video albums: 1
- Mini-albums: 1

Albums

Title	Album details	Peak chart positions		
Title	Album details	JPN Oricon	JPN Oricon Indies	JPN Billboard Top
Destrose	Released: April 10, 2013; Label: Flying Cat; Note: Full-length album	69	7	50
The Prologue	Released: September 24, 2014; Label: Flying Cat; Note: Mini-album	99	5	77
Chronicles ~The Complete Flyingcat Recordings~	Release: June 30, 2021; Label: Flying Cat / VAA; Note: Remastered 3 CD and 1 DVD set; VAA Official Store Exclusive	—	—	—
"—" denotes a recording that did not chart.

Singles

Title	Year	Peak chart positions		
Title	Year	JPN Oricon	JPN Oricon Indies	JPN Billboard Top Singles
"Hakai no Bara" (破壊の薔薇): Released: October 2, 2010; Label: Self-released	2010	—	—	—
"Deathless Memories": Released: May 25, 2011; Label: Marianne	2011	162	8	—
"Fenixx -To Revive-": Released: March 28, 2012; Label: Flying Cat	2012	131	7	—
"Nostphilia": Released: November 14, 2012; Label: Flying Cat	2012	107	—	88
"Rin / Maze" (霖 -Rin-/MAZE): Released: November 13, 2013; Label: Flying Cat	2013	82	7	75
"—" denotes a recording that did not chart.

Video albums

Title	Album details	Peak chart positions
Title	Album details	JPN Oricon
2013.11.14 Destrose One-man Live! At Shibuya O-West	Released: June 25, 2014; Label: Flying Cat	82
