= Bakufu-Slump =

Japanese rock band

- Origin: Tokyo, Japan
- Genre: Rock
- Years active: 1981–1999, 2004, 2005, 2010, 2024–
- Labels: CBS/Sony, Sony
- Members: Sunplaza Nakano-kun; Papala Kawai; Funky Sueyoshi; BarbeQ Wasada
- Past members: Hojin Egawa

Bakufu-Slump (Japanese: 爆風スランプ, Hepburn: Bakufū Suranpu) is a Japanese rock band originally active between 1981 and 1999. One of the most popular rock bands in Japan during the 1980s and '90s, it is known for its best-selling single "Runner", released in 1988.

== Members ==
- Sunplaza Nakano: vocals. Changed his stage name to Sunplaza Nakano-kun in 2008.
- Papala Kawai: guitar
- Funky Sueyoshi: drums, leader
- BarbeQ Wasada: bass

=== Former members ===
- Hojin Egawa (Hahihuhe Hojin): bass guitar (1981–1989)

=== Associate members ===
- Michihiko Ota: keyboards (1986–1987)
- Takeshi Honda (Dan Honda): keyboards (1987–1991)
- Masahiro Kuroishi (Chashumen Kuroishi): saxophone & keyboards (1987–1991)
- Masakuni Takeno: saxophone & keyboards (1990)
- Hirohiko Fukuda (Emperor Fukuda): keyboards (2004–2005)

== History ==
=== Before and after debut ===
Funky Sueyoshi and Hojin Egawa, then members of funk band Bop Gun and winners of the Grand Prix in the EastWest band contest sponsored by the Yamaha Music Foundation in 1981, formed Bakufu-Slump together with Sunplaza Nakano and Papala Kawai, then members of Super Slump, a rock band which won the Excellent Group Award in the same contest. The band got together in June 1982.

The band originally performed extreme acts during its live concerts such as dowsing the audience with fire extinguishers, throwing watermelons, throwing tatami mats and wooden boards then performing on them, holding shoes or lit fireworks in their mouths, igniting fuel-soaked cotton balls on their heads, among others. They were considered a "comic band" because of their obscene and idiosyncratic lyrics with taboo words and their costumes. For this reason, at the time of their debut, they were sometimes considered one of "Sony's three most colorful bands" together with Seikima-II (Fitzbeat) and Kome Kome Club (CBS/Sony), both of which belonged to the same Sony-affiliated record company. Bakufu-Slump and Seikima-II, in particular, were from Sony's audition division "Sound Development" (distinguished by the SD mark).

Their management agency at the time of their debut was Office Suika.

In June 1985, the band made its first appearance on Fuji TV's music show Yoru no Hit Studio Deluxe and went on a rampage, doing the aforementioned fire performance (which later drew complaints from the fire department) and walking around the studio shaking hands with other performers and orchestra players. In subsequent appearances on the same program, such acts took place repeatedly, including breaking The Alfee's set and climbing on top of the cameras.

On December 13, 1985, Bakufu-Slump performed at the Nippon Budokan for the first time. After performing at the Kudan Kaikan in the previous year, singer Sunplaza Nakano could see the Budokan from the bathroom window and thought, "I wish I could do a concert there". Soon he was told by his record company it had reserved the Budokan for a concert later in the following year. In anticipation, Nakano believed there was no way they could fill the Budokan to capacity. From this idea, a romantic song was composed as an excuse for empty seats, about a pen pal girl who didn't attend the concert being the reason of it. The song, "Okina Tamanegi no Shita de" ("Under the Big Onion", in reference to the giboshi on the Budokan's roof) was later regarded as one of their best-known works. Bakufu-Slump performed in front of a full house at the Budokan and soon after it gradually became recognized as a talented band with a strong rhythm section.

=== Runner ===
As the band's activities began to show their limits, they moved to Daikanyama Production in 1986 with Ichiro Nitta as their producer. Nitta initially decided to adopt a more commercial approach, but bassist Hojin Egawa didn't approve the new direction and decided to leave the band. Nakano wrote lyrics to a song composed by drummer Funky Sueyoshi, using Egawa's departure from the band as inspiration, and "Runner" was born. Released in 1988 and selling 340,000 copies, the song became a longtime hit.

The song was performed on NHK's music program Just Pop-Up and the program was inundated with requests. This led to Bakufu-Slump's participation in the 39th NHK Kohaku Uta Gassen in 1988, and its second performance at the Budokan on January 9, 1989. Egawa left the group after this performance. The original plan was for a three-day performance on January 7, 8 and 9, but due to the death of Emperor Showa, the band refrained from performing on January 7 and 8.

"Runner" became a big hit when it was used as an insert song for Takeshi Kitano's program "Tensai Takeshi no Genki ga Daru TV!!". The song also became very popular in karaoke and a staple in high school baseball brass bands as a fight song.

After Egawa's departure, the substitute bassists for TV appearances included Kazuyuki Sekiguchi of Southern All Stars, Zenon Ishikawa of Seikima-II, Ken Sakurai of The Alfee, Satomi Senba of Show-Ya, Atsuko Watanabe of Princess Princess, Kazuya Takahashi of Otokogumi, Kiyoshi Kakinuma of Stardust Revue, Casiopea keyboardist Minoru Mukaiya (playing synth bass), and Chiba's local talent, Jaguar. Later, TOPS bassist Tatsuhiko Wasada (BarbeQ Wasada) joined as an official member. This was the only member change in Bakufu-Slump.

The band had a close friendship with Seikima-II and TOPS, who were active at the same time and often performed live together. Masahiro Mitsui, the vocalist of TOPS, became the manager of Bakufu Slump after Wasada joined the band in 1989.

=== Further hits ===
In 1989, after transferring to Amuse, which was effectively the parent company of Daikanyama Productions, the band continued to release hits with "Gekko", "Rizo Raba -Resort Lovers-", and a remake version of "Okina Tamanegi no Shita de" from their 1985 album "Shiawase".

During this period, their own TV show, "Bakufu Slump no Omiya", aired on Nippon Television. Later, as the members' fatigue had built up, they individually went abroad to take long vacations.

The overseas experience inspired the album "Oragayo 〜in the 7th heaven〜", released in November 1990, which included "The 7th Heaven", performed by Nakano and Kawai at a political demonstration in South Africa. Sueyoshi was fascinated by China and finally shifted his main focus to that country, where he became known as the "Asian Drum King".

=== Stagnation period – Solo activities ===
After "Oragayo", the band released the album "Seishun-Oh" in September 1991, based around the theme of "youth" just like their hit "Runner," but they couldn't achieve the same level of success as with their previous works. They entered a long period of stagnation with only one hit single released in March 1992, "Namida² (Love Version)".

During this period, each member began to pursue solo activities, and each of them achieved some success.

On November 6, 1992, they appeared on TV Asahi "Music Station" and Sunplaza Nakano dived into the audience. He broke two miniature light bulbs and a panel, showing a glimpse of his wildness.

=== Collaboration with Denpa Shonen ===
Bakufu-Slump's 1996 single "Tabibito – The Longest Journey" was chosen as the support song for "Saruganseki's hitchhiking across Eurasia" from the Nippon Television's variety show "Susume! Denpa Shonen". The single became a hit song as the hitchhiking project became popular. The album "Kaibutsu-kun" was released shortly after in January 1997 in a two-disc set (first pressing limited edition).

=== End of activities ===
In March 1998, the band's 32nd and last single "Attakai Hibi" was released, followed by the last album "Hard Boiled" on April 1.

In April 1999, they announced that they would be suspending their activities.

== Post-hiatus ==
After a hiatus in April 1999, Nakano and Kawai reformed Super Slump. Sueyoshi and Wasada are currently active in the hard rock band X.Y.Z.→A.

In December 2004, they reunited for one day only as part of a project for Asahi Broadcasting Corporation's "Ohayo Asahi Desu", for which Nakano was the Tuesday commentator at the time, and performed at the ABC Hall in Osaka.

On December 19 and 20, 2005, they held a two-day reunion live concert, "45-nenrei no fesu (day of love, day of youth)", at the Shinjuku Koma Theater. This live performance was streamed on USEN's video on-demand service GyaO.

On December 30, 2007, as a one-day reunion, the band participated in "Thanx! ELL 30th Anniversary Special" at the Nagoya live house "ELL" and performed for the first time in two years. Performing with them was 175R, who covered the song "Sorekara" from Bakufu-Slump's 6th album "I.B.W -It's a Beautiful World-", released in 1989.

On October 5, 2008, at the Ohorikawa Disaster Prevention and Recreation Park in Kashiwa, Nakano, Sueyoshi and Wasada performed together almost as Bakufu-Slump, with Kawai absent (later renamed "Sunplaza Nakano-kun Band" and "SFQ") and participated in "Otomachi Kashiwa 2008 -MUSIC PLATFORM-". They performed songs from their Bakufu-Slump days.

On December 12, 2010, they held a one-day revival live performance at the Tokyo International Forum, "Bakufu Fukkatsu Shimansu Live! "Sunplaza Nakano-kun 50-sai da!-". At this live performance, various surprises were held to commemorate Sunplaza Nakano-kun's 50th birthday. Demon Kakka appeared to announce the band before the show started. He said that he had come to proselytize because a Seikima-II mass was being held at the next hall on the same day at the same place. The announcement was pre-recorded. Dengeki Network also appeared during Bakufu-Slump's performance of their song "Muri da". Nakano and Kawai joined in Dengeki Network's extreme stunts, adding to the excitement.

In September 2011, Funky Sueyoshi decided to produce a tribute album to Bakufu-Slump, and invited musicians who were close to him to participate. The musicians who agreed to participate were Earthshaker, Nobuya Ikuta (Noise Factory), Shunsuke Ishikawa (Seikima-II), Yuichiro Uchida (Kinniku Shōjo Tai), Tatsuya "Paul" Umehara (44 Magnum), X.Y.Z.→A, Ōsama, Kenji Otsuki (as Sunplaza Koenji-kun); Hideki Watanabe, Tomoharu Taguchi, Koji Kasa and Hideyuki Yonekawa (C-C-B); Yasuhisa Soga (THE GOOD-BYE), Masayuki Tanaka (Crystal King), Demon Kakka (Seikima-II), Hoppy Kamiyama, Masahiro Mitsui (formerly of Tops), Masayoshi Yamashita (Loudness), Lolita No.18, among others. The tribute album, entitled "We Love Bakufu Slump," was released on December 25.

On January 15, 2013, "Bakufu Tribute Omake Complete" was released with new additions to the aforementioned album, including Ace, Crack Banquet, Rolly, The Captains, Mana Ueno, Ozu, Tatsuhiko Wasada, Kyoji Yamamoto, and Wa-ON (Yoshio Nomura + Rie Chikaraishi). Live concerts were held on January 13 and 14 of the same year to commemorate the release, featuring several of the participating artists.

On February 26, 2019, "Egawa Hojin Charity Mini Live" was held at Meguro Live Station. The event was part of a fundraising campaign to support the band's former bassist Hojin Egawa, who was involved in a car accident in December 2018 and ended up in a coma. As of June 15, 2022, he is still unable to move on his own and it is unlikely for him to return to the stage, but the Egawa Hojin Fundraising Liaison Committee has announced that he has begun rehabilitation. He appears to have come out of a coma.

=== 40th anniversary and band reunion ===
On March 1, 2024, the band announced a reunion for the 40th anniversary of its debut on the band's Sony Music official website. They announced a live tour starting in October and also a new song.

On July 13, 2024, for the first time in 28 years, the four of them appeared together as Bakufu-Slump on TBS TV's "Ongaku no hi" and sang "Ōkina tamanegi no shita de" live.

On August 6, 2024, the band released a teaser for the music video of their new song in 26 years, "Ikigai". The song was released on August 25, the 40th anniversary of Bakufu-Slump's debut. The cover art was drawn by Kazuyuki Sekiguchi of Southern All Stars. Along with the release of the new song, a new compilation album was released on October 23, called "40th Anniversary Best Ikigai 2024". It's the first compilation album in 15 years since the release of "Golden☆Best" in 2009, with the songs and track order chosen by the band members.

The band started a live tour at Electric Lady Land in Nagoya on October 31, 2024. The tour final performance at Tokyo's LINE CUBE SHIBUYA on November 17 was broadcast live exclusively on Space Shower TV.

== Discography ==
=== Albums ===
- よい (Yoi / English: Alright)（August 8, 1984）
- しあわせ (Shiawase / En.: Happiness)（November 1, 1985）
- 楽 (Raku / En.: Easy)（October 22, 1986）
- Jungle （October 1, 1987）
- High Lander （November 2, 1988）
- I.B.W.（November 1, 1989）
- ORAGAYO 〜in the 7th heaven〜（November 10, 1990）
- 青春王 (Seishun'ō / En.: King of Youth)（September 21, 1991）
- アジポン (Ajipon)（November 21, 1992）
- TENSION（March 21, 1994）
- ピロリ (Pirori / Pylori)（April 21, 1995）
- 怪物くん (Kaibutsu-kun / En.: Monster-kun)（January 22, 1997）
- ハードボイルド(Hādoboirudo / Hard-boiled)（April 1, 1998）

=== Singles ===
- 週刊東京『少女A』 (Shūkan Tōkyō "shōjo A" / En.: Tokyo Weekly "Girl A")（August 25, 1984）
- うわさに、なりたい (Uwasa ni, naritai / En.: I Want To Be a Rumor)（December 8, 1984）
- 無理だ!決定盤〜You Can Not Do That〜 (Murida! Kettei-ban / Impossible! Definitive Edition)（May 22, 1985）
- 嗚呼!武道館 (Aa! Budōkan / En.: Oh! Budōkan)（October 10, 1985）
- 青春の役立たず (Seishun no yakutatazu / En.: The Uselessness of Youth)（February 26, 1986）
- らくだ/ヤシの木かげ (Rakuda/Yashinoki-kage / En.: Camel/Palm Tree Shade)（June 21, 1986）
- まっくろけ (Makkuroke / En.: Pitch Black)（September 5, 1986）
- 愛がいそいでる (Ai ga isoideru / Love is in a Hurry)（1987年4月22日）
- The Tsurai (September 21, 1987)
- きのうのレジスタンス (Kinō no rejisutansu / Yesterday's Resistance)（April 8, 1988）
- ひどく暑かった日のラヴソング (Hidoku atsukatta hi no rabusongu / En.: A Love Song on a Terribly Hot Day) (August 1, 1988)
- Runner（October 21, 1988）
- 月光 (Gekkō / En.: Moonlight)（April 7, 1989）
- リゾ・ラバ -Resort Lovers- (Rizo・Raba)（July 19, 1989）
- 大きな玉ねぎの下で 〜はるかなる想い (Ōkina tamanegi no shita de 〜 harukanaru omoi / En.: Under the Big Onion – Faraway Thoughts)（October 21, 1989）
- 45歳の地図（辛口生ヴァージョン） (45-Sai no chizu – karakuchi-sei bājon / En.: 45 Year Old Map – Dry Raw Version)（April 8, 1990）
- 組曲「天下御免の回り物」より 第一章カネ(マネーに捧ぐ) (Kumikyoku "tenka gomen no mawari-mono" yori daiisshō kane – manē ni sasagu / En.: Suite from "Tenka no Mawarimono" Chapter 1: Money – Dedicated to (Pink Floyd's) Money)（October 21, 1990）
- おお Beijing (Oh Beijing)（January 21, 1991）
- 東京ラテン系セニョリータ (Tōkyō Raten-kei senyorīta / Tokyo Latina Señorita)（June 21, 1991）
- がんばれ、タカハシ! (Ganbare, takahashi! / En.: Good luck, Takahashi!)（November 1, 1991）
- 涙2 (Love ヴァージョン) (Namida 2 – LOVE bājon / En.: Tears 2 – LOVE Version))（March 1, 1992）
- 友情≧愛 (Yūjō ≧ ai / En.: Friendship ≥ Love)（July 22, 1992）
- さよなら文明/涙3 (ナミダサンジョウ) (Sayonara bunmei/Namida 3 – namidasanjou / En.: Goodbye Civilization/Tears 3 – Tears Are Flowing)（October 21, 1992）
- マンビー人生 (Manbī jinsei / En.: Mambi Life)（May 21, 1993）
- 勝負は時の運だから (Shōbu wa toki no un dakara / En.: Because Victory Depends on The Moment's Luck)（February 21, 1994）
- 愛のチャンピオン (Ai no chanpion / En.: Love Champion)（July 21, 1994）
- 神話 (Shinwa / En.: Myth)（February 22, 1995）
- 新しいことを始めよう (Atarashī koto o hajimeyou / En.: Let's Start Something New)（May 22, 1996）
- 旅人よ 〜The Longest Journey (Tabibito yo / En.: I'm a Traveler)（September 21, 1996）
- 天使の涙 (Tenshi no namida / En.: Tears of An Angel)（June 1, 1997）
- モンスター (Monsutā / En.: Monster)（August 8, 1997）
- 暖かい日々 (Attakai hibi / En.: Warm Days)（March 1, 1998）
- 45歳の地図 〜リストラバージョン〜 (45-Sai no chizu – risutora bājon / En.: 45 Year Old Map – Restructuring Version)（December 7, 2005）
- Ikigai (August 25, 2024)
