= Seikima-II =

Japanese heavy metal band

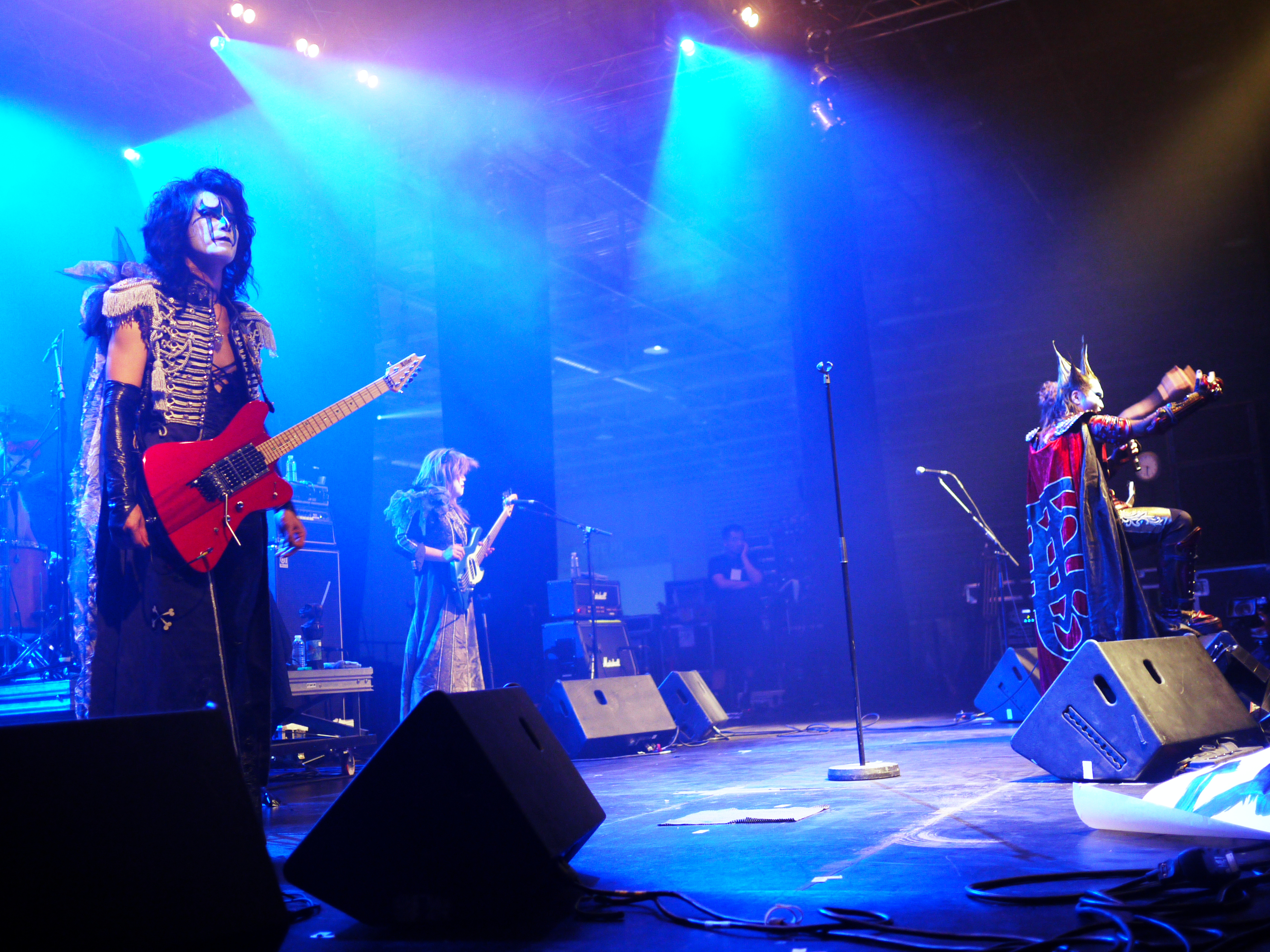
- Seikima-II at Japan Expo in Paris, 2010.

Background information
- Origin: Shinjuku, Tokyo, Japan
- Genres: Heavy metal, hard rock
- Works: Seikima-II discography
- Years active: 1982–1999 (Reunions: 2005, 2010, 2011, 2015–2016, 2020–present)
- Labels: Fitzbeat, CBS/Sony, BMG Japan, HPQ/Avex
- Members: Demon Kakka; Raiden Yuzawa; Xenon Ishikawa; Luke Takamura; Jail O'Hashi
- Past members: Ace Shimizu; Damian Hamada; Majo Ryoko; Giantonio Babayashi; Zeed Iijima; Gandhara Sangeria Tigris-Euphrates Kaneko; Jagy Furukawa; Zod Hoshijima
- Website: Official site

Seikima-II (Japanese: 聖飢魔II(せいきまつ), Hepburn: Seikimatsu) is a Japanese heavy metal band, formed in 1982. Throughout their career they have had numerous lineups, with lead singer Demon Kakka the sole constant member. The group has sold over 10 million records in Japan alone.

The band members each wear face paint and elaborate stage outfits and have adopted fictional personas for the purpose of theatrics. According to their fictional backstory, Seikima-II are a group of Akuma (悪魔; "demons") from the futuristic hyper-evolved dimension Makai (魔界; "demon world") that preach a religion called Akumakyō (悪魔教) in order to propagate Satan through the use of heavy metal music. Each member is a demon of a different hierarchical class, with His Excellency Demon Kakka being leader of the Akuma and His Majesty Damian Hamada being the "Crown Prince of Hell". In their backstory and songs such as "The End of the Century", Seikima-II prophesied that they would conquer the world for the forces of evil and, after successfully completing the task, would disband at the end of the 20th century. This story culminated in 1999 with a series of three consecutive concerts called The Black Mass Final 3 Nights on December 29–31, with the last known as "The Doomsday". In accordance to the fictional prophecy and after completing their "world conquest", the band disbanded after the third concert at the exact end of the century on December 31, 1999, at 23:59:59 JST.

However, Seikima-II has had several limited reunions since their disbandment. One in 2005 to celebrate the 20th anniversary of their debut and another in 2010 celebrating their 25th anniversary, the latter including their first ever world tour. In 2011, an encore of their world tour was held and the band hosted two charity concerts that included several different artists in response to the Tōhoku earthquake and tsunami. They performed a two leg 30th anniversary tour from September 2015 into February 2016. Seikima-II was scheduled to perform a 35th anniversary tour in 2020 and then 2021, but both were turned into fan events due to the continued COVID-19 pandemic. They released their first album of new material in 23 years in 2022, and are set to continue the reunion and tour into 2026.

== History ==
=== 1982–1986: Formation and early success ===
Seikima (聖飢魔) means "Holy Devouring Demon", but with the II ("tsu") added to the end it becomes a play on the term seikimatsu (世紀末) or "the end of the century". It is also an abbreviation of the phrase Seinaru mono ni ueteiru akuma ga futatabi (tsū) yomigaeru (聖なる物に飢えている悪魔がII（ふたた）び蘇る, "the demon that devours holiness has resurrected again").

Seikima-II was formed in late December 1982 by guitarist Damian Hamada while he was attending the Waseda University Folk Song Club. The original lineup included His Excellency Demon Kakka (then known as "Demon Kogure") on vocals, Zod Hoshijima on bass and Ace Shimizu on drums. The band was known for their Kabuki-inspired makeup and flamboyant outfits. Damian Hamada left the band soon after its formation and had his last show with them on February 18, 1985 at Shibuya Live-Inn. He remained a respected founder and songwriter throughout their career.

In September 1983, two new members joined the band's lineup. Majo ("witch") Ryoko joined as keyboardist, however she only stayed for one month. Zeed Iijima joined as drummer replacing Ace, who briefly left in October before returning as a guitarist that same month. That year, the band had its first live performance (a concert by the band is referred to as a Black Mass (黒ミサ)) playing a series of small gigs. They gained popularity among metal fans for their heavy music style and unique appearance.

In 1984, Seikima-II continued to play small gigs at various concert halls. In April, Giantonio Babayashi both joined and left as a second guitarist. Later that year, they passed an audition for major label CBS/Sony.

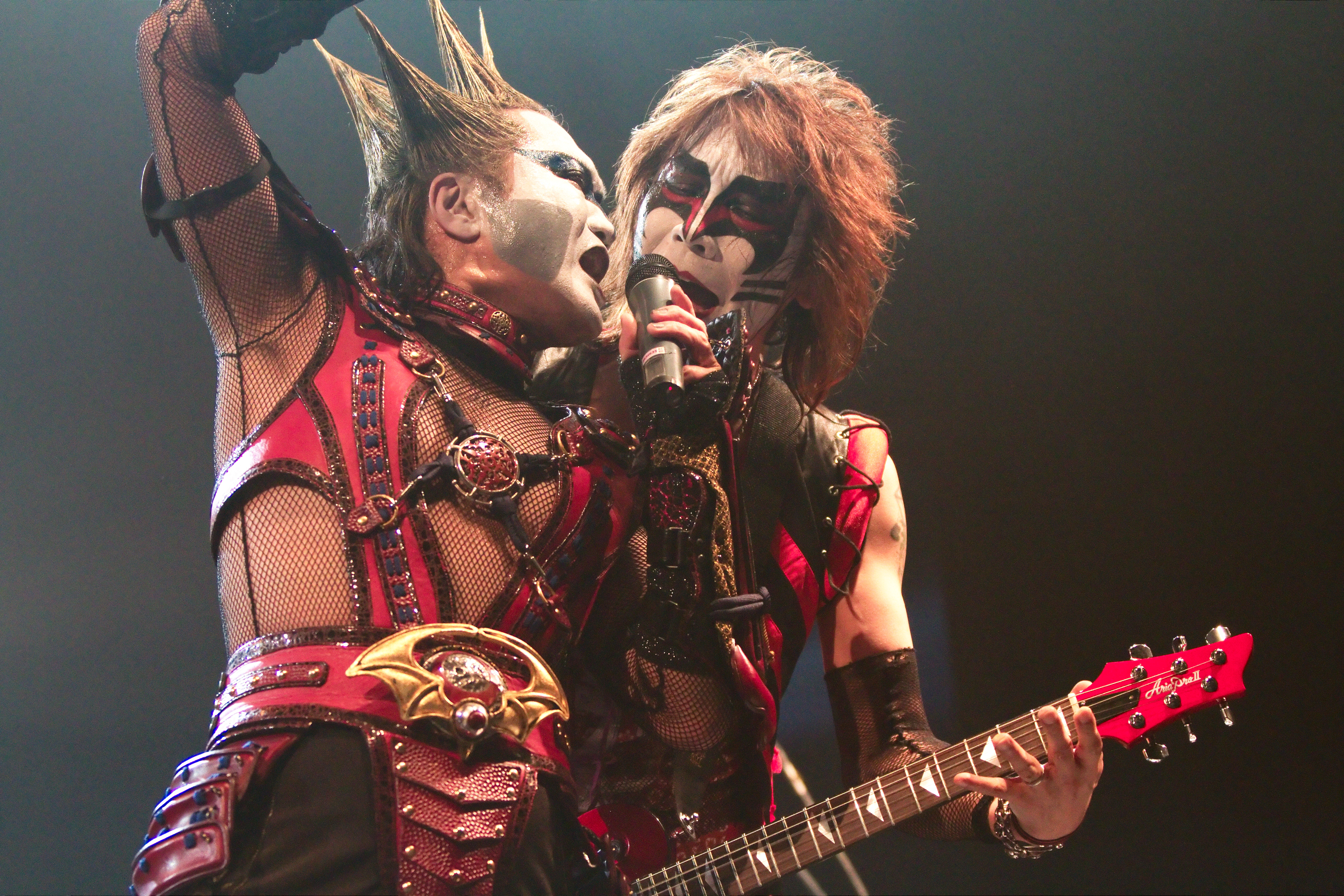
Demon Kakka and Jail O'Hashi performing in 2010.

1985 marked the year in which the band's biggest lineup change would occur. A new second guitarist, Gandhara Sangeria Tigris-Euphrates Kaneko joined in January. Drummer Zeed Iijima decided to finally leave the band in April. In March he was temporarily replaced by a new drummer named Jagy Furukawa. Soon, Gandhara and Jagy both left the group in June. At this point the band was lacking in both a second guitarist and a drummer. In June they discovered guitarist Jail O'Hashi and drummer Raiden Yuzawa, who would both go on to be part of the first well-known lineup. Later in September of that same year, the group released their first full-length album (an album by the band is called a "Scripture of Doctrine" (大教典, Dai Kyōten)), Seikima-II ~ Akuma ga Kitarite Heavy Metal. The album received a now-infamous rating of 0 by the metal magazine Burrn!, but sold over 100,000 copies, marking the first time a Japanese metal band had done so. Their first official debut show to start their invasion of Earth was at Shinjuku Ruido on Friday September 13.

On April 2, 1986, they released both their second album, The End of the Century, and their first single "Rōningyō no Yakata". (A single by the band is called a "Chapter of Doctrine" (小教典, Ko Kyōten).) The End of the Century reached number 5 on the Oricon Albums Chart and sold over 200,000 copies. The album's name was also the meaning behind Seikima-II (seikimatsu), as according to them, they were destined to disband at the end of the century (the year 1999). In June bassist Zod, who was one of the original members, would finally leave the band, being replaced by Xenon Ishikawa. At the end of the year they released their third album, From Hell with Love. This was followed by their first major live concert called The Great Black Mass Tour held on December 24, 1986. That same year, a video game was released for the Famicom based on the band, under the title Seikima II Akuma no Gyakushū!. The game was re-released for the MSX2 the following year.

=== 1987–1999: Popularity and disbandment ===
One year later, in January 1987, guitarist Jail O'Hashi also decided to leave the band. He abandoned his band name and would later be recognized as Takashi "Jam" O'Hashi, playing in the American/Japanese hard rock group Cats in Boots and in his own band, the Takashi O'Hashi Project, although he would once again go by "Jail O'Hashi" while playing with Seikima-II at future concerts. In February, guitarist Sgt. Luke Takamura III joined the group to form the most well-known lineup. That same year Seikima-II released their Big Time Changes album. This album brought about a change in the band's music style by mixing heavy metal with hard rock. Also here for the first time, Luke Takamura takes on the role as more of a lead guitarist, switching off with Ace Shimizu, who is heard playing more rhythm guitar. In 1988 they continued their experimentation with other genres on the album The Outer Mission. With this album they experimented with a fusion of heavy metal, progressive rock and even some jazz music to add for an interesting new sound. Regardless of these changes they continued being praised by heavy metal fans while also receiving attention from the general public. Seikima-II's 1989 compilation album Worst made them the first Japanese metal band to reach number one on the Oricon chart. That same year, a home video release also titled The Outer Mission was directed by Makoto Tezuka. At the end of 1989, Seikima-II became the first heavy metal band to perform at Kōhaku Uta Gassen.

After releasing their next album Yūgai in 1991, the band began playing their first overseas concerts in surrounding Asian countries and in Europe, most notably England and Spain. Later in 1992, they followed up by releasing Kyōfu no Restaurant, which, as a drastic change from the last few albums, was a return to their heavy metal roots; combining dark, Satanic lyrics with heavy music.

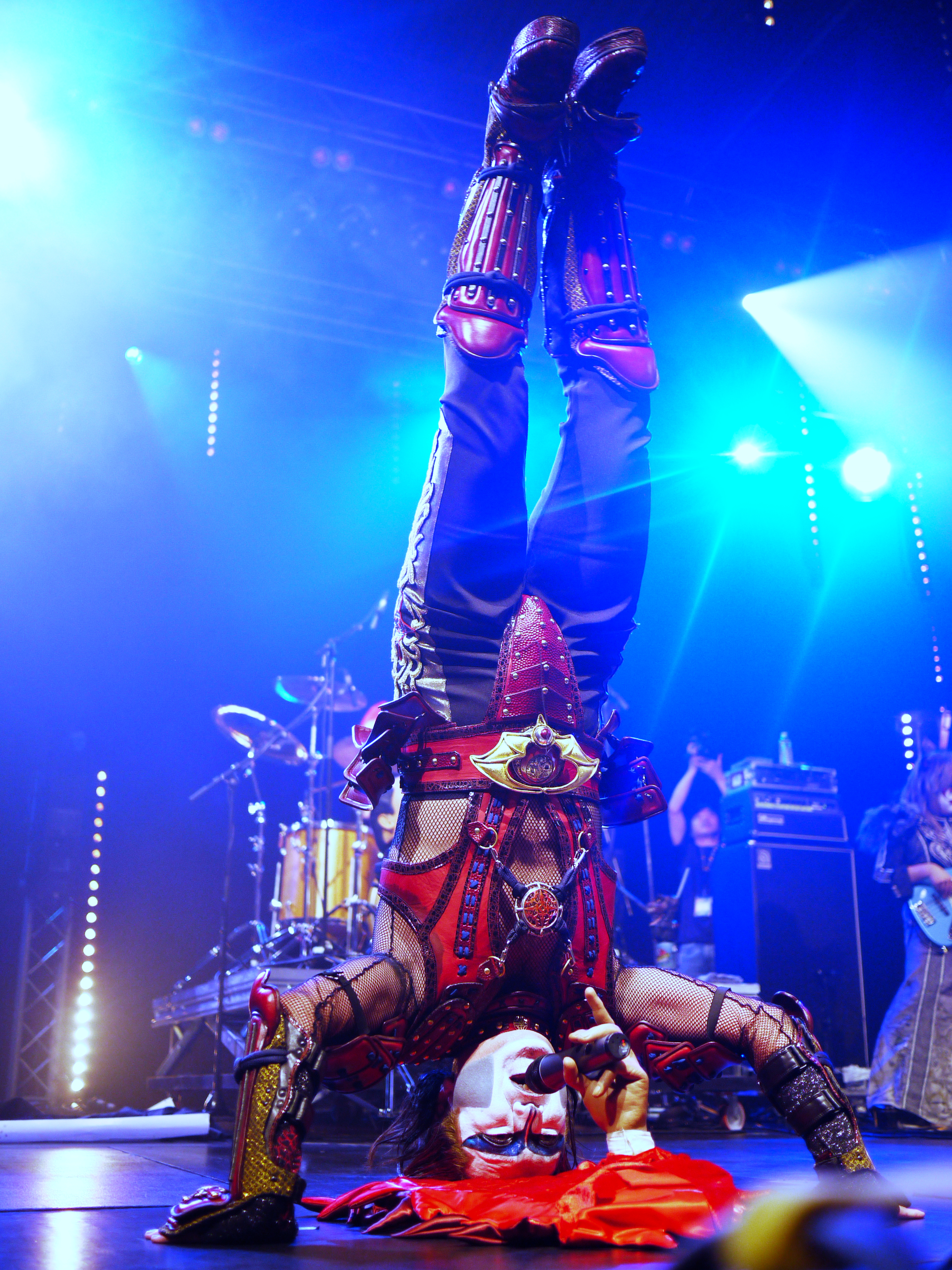
Demon Kakka performing the song "Dead Symphony".

Their next album Ponk!!, released in 1994, brought about even more change from the band's past style. Combining heavy metal with folk rock music and more ballad songs. The album was produced at Abbey Road Studios in London, England.

In 1996, the Seikima-II released their next full-length album, Mephistopheles no Shōzō, leaving the CBS Sony label and signing to BMG Japan. The album was a return to their heavier sound while also having elements of power metal. The move to BMG also made a noticeable difference in the sound quality of their following albums. In 1997 the album News was released, followed by Move in 1998. Both albums bring about a new digital quality sound combining various styles with heavy metal.

In 1999, their final album, Living Legend, was released. They kept true to their roots and fans consider it to be a proper final chapter in the band's history before finally disbanding on December 31, 1999, at 23:59:59. Their final concerts were called The Black Mass Final 3 Nights, and were three days lasting from December 29–31. The concerts were separated into three days called The Theatrical Day, The Satan All Star's Day (on this night every former member and supporting member that was ever in the band performed, except Giantonio Babayashi and Gandhara Sangeria Tigris-Euphrates Kaneko, who sent video messages), The Doomsday, which at the end, the band is seen disappearing into a portal of light leaving the stage and finishing their 14-year career.

After disbanding in 1999, each member continued musical careers. Demon Kakka has been a solo artist since the early 1990s and still continues to perform and release new material. Ace Shimizu has been involved in his own two piece band called Face to Ace. Luke Takamura formed the hard rock band Canta with Raiden Yuzawa. Xenon Ishikawa was involved in the band RX with Raiden and Seikima-II support keyboardist Yuichi Matsuzaki.

=== Reunions ===
In late 2005, the final line-up of Seikima-II held two different kinds of reunion tours in Japan for the 20th anniversary of their debut. The first tour included guitarist Jail O'Hashi, bassist Zod Hoshijima and enka singer Kiyoko Suizenji as special guests. The reunion tours were both very well received and were completely sold out within a short period of time. They later released two live albums recorded on the tours, with the second including a bonus CD of six new songs written by the band.

The album Akuma Nativity "Songs of the Sword" received a physical release on September 16, 2009. It includes the band's classic songs completely re-recorded in English. The similar albums Akuma Relativity and A Quarter Century of Rebellion were released a year later on July 28, 2010.

In 2010, Seikima-II reunited to celebrate their 25th anniversary and to perform a world tour entitled Intercontinental Black Mass Tour. It was announced that guitarist Ace Shimizu, an original member of the band, would not be taking part and instead Jail O'Hashi would rejoin the group. On June 6 they held their first concert in America at Project A-Kon in Dallas, Texas. On July 4 they held their second show in Europe when they visited Paris, France for the Japan Expo. On September 3 and 4 they performed in Korea at the Viva! Korea Rock Festival, which was broadcast on TV. A tribute album to the band, titled Tribute to Seikima-II: Akuma to no Keiyakusho, was released on September 15, 2010, and features their songs covered by artists such as Show-Ya, Sex Machineguns and Galneryus.

An "encore" of their world tour was held from July to September 2011. Then on November 30 and December 1, 2011, Seikima-II revived once again for charity concerts titled Seikima-II Presents Tribute to Japan. They included several different artists, them being Cali Gari, jealkb, Man With A Mission, Nokko, Kishidan and Rookiez is Punk'd, and were in response to the Tōhoku earthquake and tsunami. All proceeds were donated to the Japanese Red Cross. Material from both nights was released as a live CD and DVD on June 20, 2012.

The compilation XXX -The Ultimate Worst- was released on August 26, 2015. That year, Seikima-II performed a tour in celebration of their 30th anniversary. Split into two legs, Zenseki Shikei and Zoku Zenseki Shikei, the first was held from September 17 to November 8 and the second from November 26, 2015, to January 21, 2016. A final concert to the reunion was held at the Nippon Budokan on February 20. The band released their first single in 17 years on April 13, 2016. Both of the double A-side's songs, "Kōryōtaru Shin Sekai" (荒涼たる新世界; "Desolate New World") and "Planet/The Hell", were used as theme songs to the Terra Formars Revenge anime. The author of the original Terra Formars manga, Yū Sasuga, is a fan of Seikima-II and designed the cover of XXX -The Ultimate Worst-, which was drawn in finality by his partner on the series Kenichi Tachibana. A second double A-side single, "Noroi no Shananana/Goblin's Scale" (呪いのシャ・ナ・ナ・ナ/GOBLIN'S SCALE), was released on June 15. The first track is the theme song of the horror film Sadako vs. Kayako.

At a special event held at Zepp Tokyo on December 31, 2019, it was announced that Seikima-II would perform a 35th anniversary tour in 2020. However, on July 2 they announced that due to the COVID-19 pandemic in Japan, this was changed to events where previously recorded concerts would be screened and the members will be present for live discussions. Taking place at 15 locations between October 11 and December 27, each venue was limited to half-capacity, with two "performances" held at each; one during the day and another at night. On January 23, 2021, Seikima-II announced intentions to continue their 35th anniversary reunion into 2021 with actual concerts and a new album. However, the live performances have once again been turned into screenings of previously recorded concerts as the pandemic continues. The "tour" began on October 23 and ended on January 6, 2022. Additionally, it was announced that Ace Shimizu would appear at some of the dates, marking his first time reuniting with Seikima-II in 16 years. On June 6, the band announced that Bloodiest, their first album of original material in 23 years, would be released on September 21. It features songwriting contributions from Ace Shimizu and Damian Hamada. It was also announced to feature all the singles released in 2016, remixed with added backing vocals from Zod Hoshijima. Seikima-II will perform a tour from October 6, 2022, to February 15, 2023.

== Influences ==
Luke cited Yuji Adachi, Steve Vai, Eddie Van Halen and Kazumi Watanabe as guitar influences, while Ace named Lee Ritenour, Mike Stern and Pat Metheny as his favorite guitarists. Zenon named bassists Rocco Prestia, Stanley Clarke and Alphonso Johnson as inspirations. Raiden cited drummers John Bonham, Bill Bruford, Neil Peart, Johnny Yoshinaga, Steve Gadd, Steve Ferrone and Steve Jordan as influences on his playing style.

== In pop culture ==
The original video animation Seikima II Anime: Humane Society -Jinruiai ni Michita Shakai- (聖飢魔II アニメ「HUMANE SOCIETY ～人類愛に満ちた社会～」) was released in 1992 and features Seikima-II members as main characters, with Demon Kakka providing his character's voice.

The 1984 Fist of the North Star anime adaptation contains a character called Kogure, who is based on Demon Kakka, himself formerly known as Kogure.

Episode 49 of the 1992 YuYu Hakusho anime briefly mentions Seikima-II, with the parody being that a demon was listening to them on their walkman.

The aesthetics and mythology of the titular band in the 2005 manga Detroit Metal City also appears to be largely based on Seikima-II.

In 2012, the 200th episode of AKBingo! featured a cover contest for AKB48's song "Give Me Five!" and a band by the name of Niseikima-II won. In their introduction on the show, they mentioned that they were influenced by Seikima-II and also pretend to be devils and wear much makeup.

== Legacy ==
In 2018, readers and professional musicians voted Living Legend the fourth best album in the history of hard rock and heavy metal in We Rock magazine's "Metal General Election". Demon came in third place in the vocalist category, Luke came in fifth in the guitarist category, and Raiden came eighth in the drummer category.

Many notable musicians have cited Seikima-II as an influence, including Show-Ya, Go, Shinichi Kobayashi and Nov from Zigoku Quartet, Joe, Panther and Kenjiro Murai of Sex Machineguns, Tetsuya Kanmuri, Syu from Galneryus, Jun-ji of Siam Shade, Shuse and Levin of La'cryma Christi, Shouchikubai Shiratori from Kishidan, Miko of Exist Trace, Kick the Can Crew's MCU, and Hatake from Sharam Q. Tomoi from Laputa covered Seikima-II in his high school days. Mary's Blood guitarist Saki was inspired to become a musician after seeing Seikima-II on TV.

== Members ==
- His Excellency Demon Kakka – vocals (1982–1999, 2005, 2010, 2011, 2015–2016, 2020–present)
- His Imperial Highness Raiden Yuzawa – drums (1985–1999, 2005, 2010, 2011, 2015–2016, 2020–present)
- Doctor Xenon Ishikawa – bass, backing vocals (1986–1999, 2005, 2010, 2011, 2015–2016, 2020–present)
- Staff General Luke Takamura III – guitars, backing vocals (1987–1999, 2005, 2010, 2011, 2015–2016, 2020–present)
- Empire Magistrate Jail O'Hashi – guitars, backing vocals (1985–1987, 2010, 2011, 2015–2016, 2020–present)

Former members

- Captain Ace Shimizu – guitars (1983–1999, 2005, support: 2021–present), drums (1982–1983)
- His Majesty Damian Hamada – guitars (1982–1985)
- Majo Ryoko – keyboards (1983)
- Giantonio Babayashi – guitars (1984)
- Zeed Iijima – drums (1983–1985)
- Gandhara Sangeria Tigris-Euphrates Kaneko – guitars (1985; died 2012)
- Jagy Furukawa – drums (1985)
- Zod Hoshijima – bass (1982–1986)

Support members

- Wrector H – keyboards (1992–1994)
- Yuichi Matsuzaki – keyboards (1988–1992, 1994–1999, 2005, 2010, 2015–2016)
- Kamisori Syuto – keyboards (2022-present)

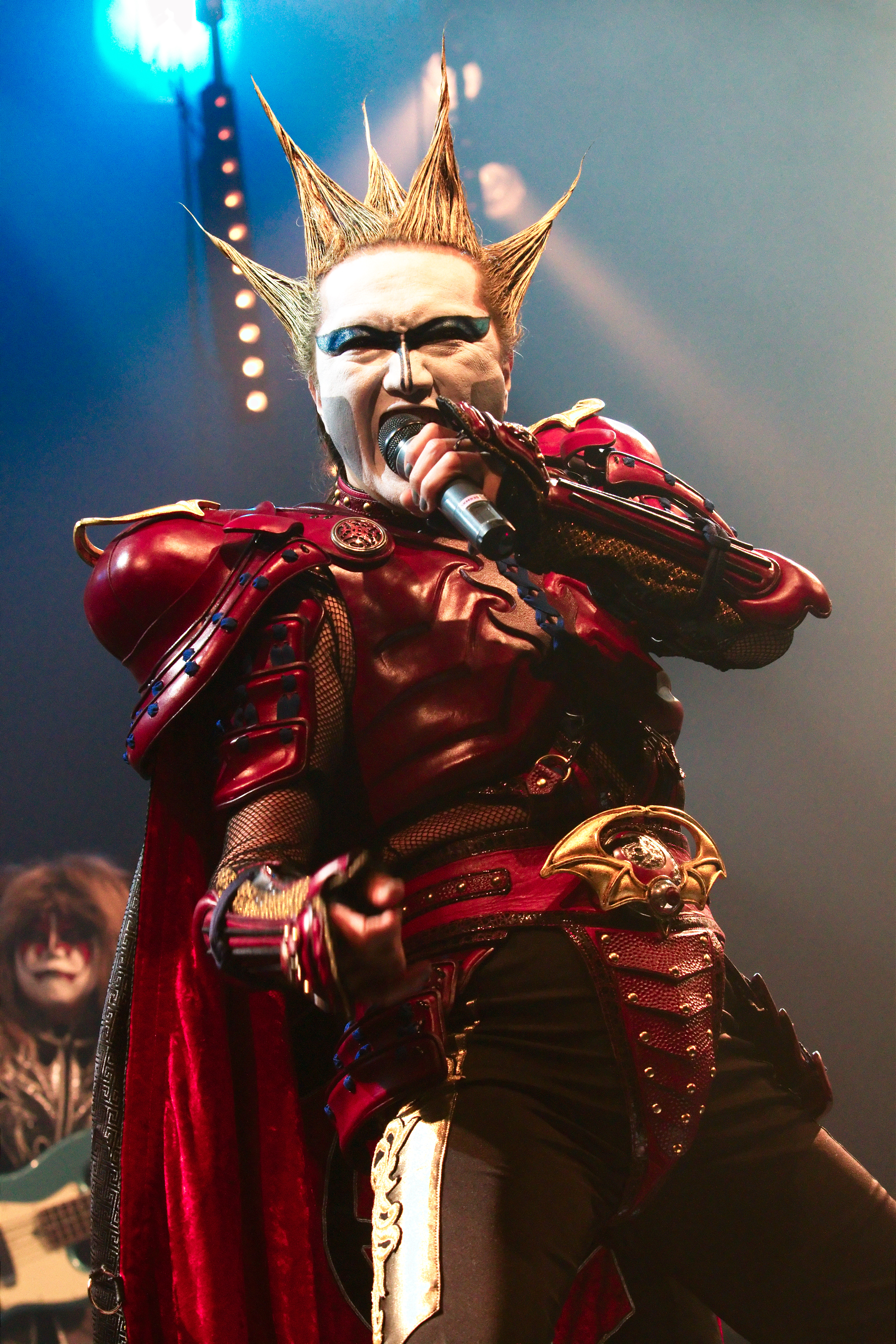
Lead vocalist Demon Kakka

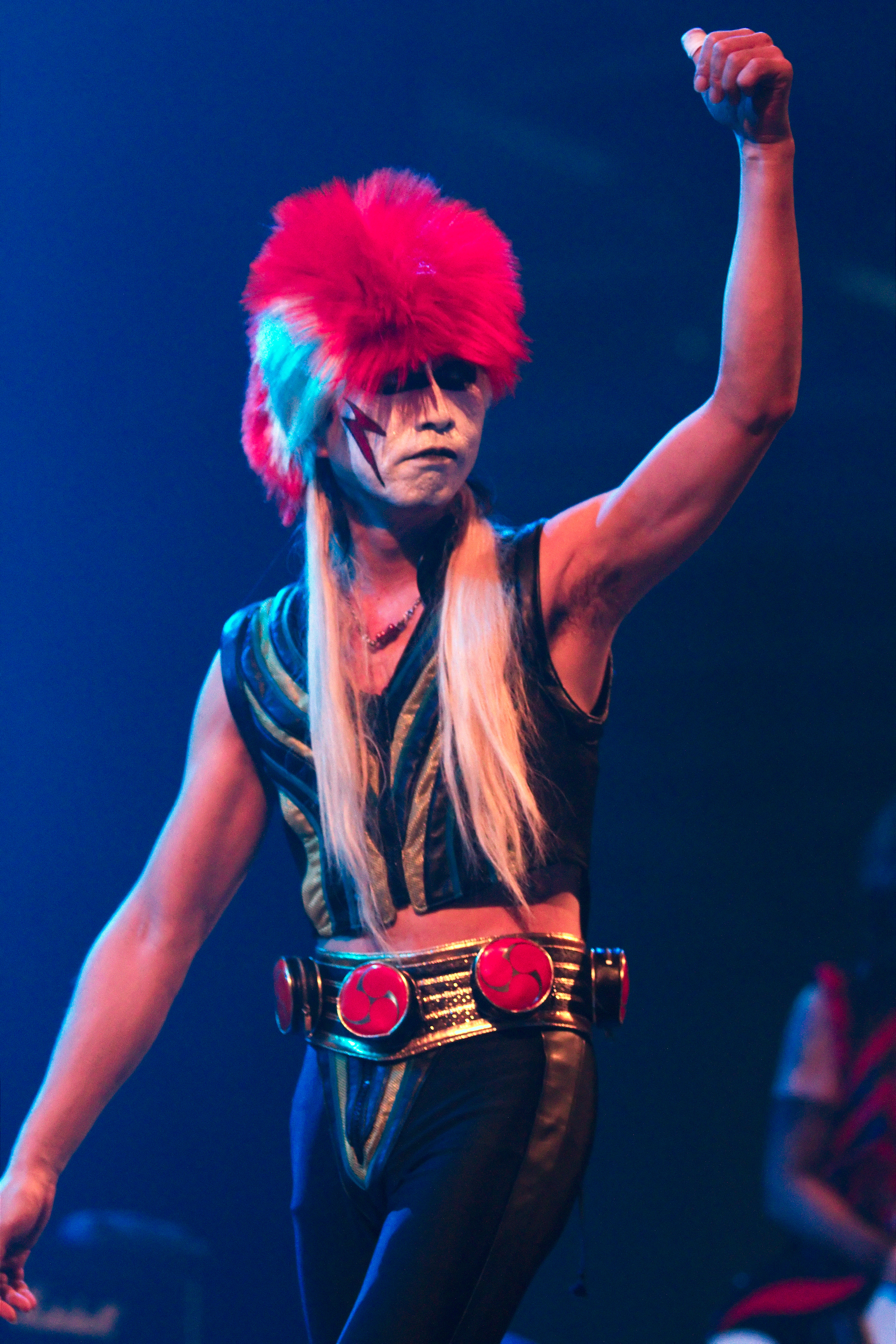
Drummer Raiden Yuzawa

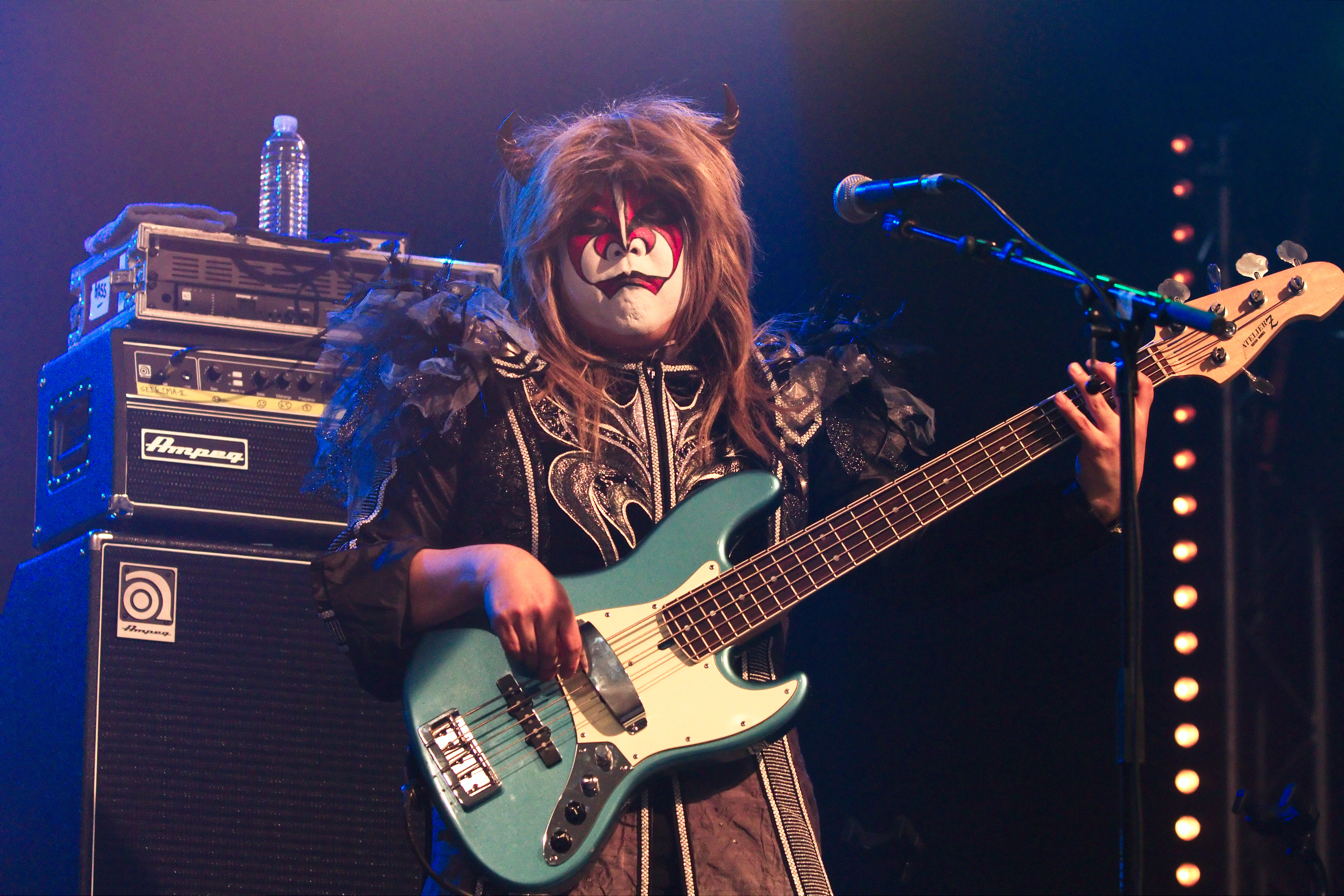
Bassist Xenon Ishikawa

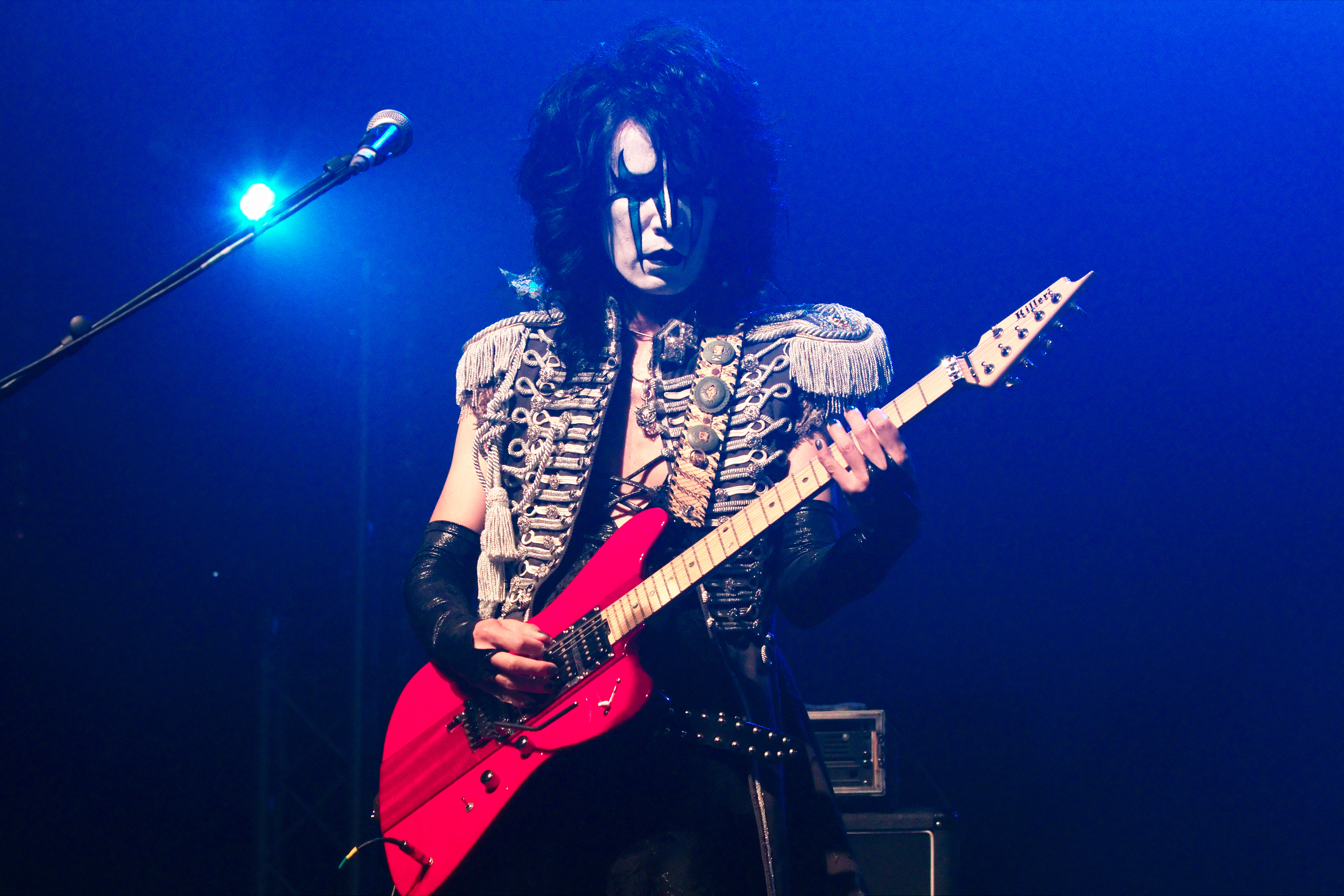
Guitarist Luke Takamura

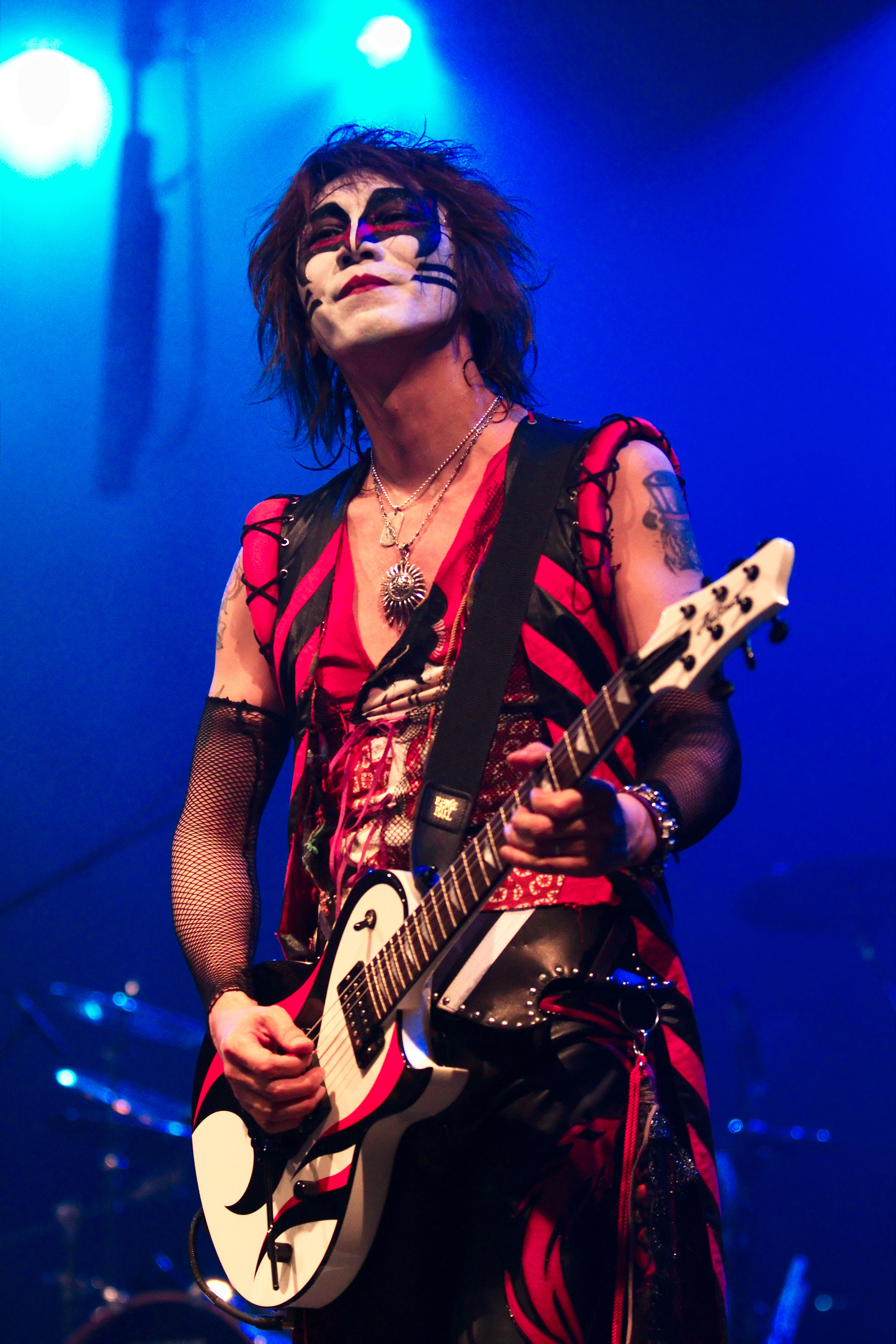
Guitarist Jail O'Hashi

== Discography ==
Studio albums

- Seikima II - Akuma ga Kitarite Heavy Metal (聖飢魔II〜悪魔が来たりてヘヴィメタる; 1985)
- The End of the Century (1986)
- From Hell with Love (地獄より愛をこめて; 1986)
- Big Time Changes (1987)
- The Outer Mission (1988)
- Yūgai (有害; 1990)
- Kyōfu no Restaurant (恐怖のレストラン; 1992)
- Ponk!! (1994)
- Mephistopheles no Shōzō (メフィストフェレスの肖像; 1996)
- News (1997)
- Move (1998)
- Living Legend (1999)
- Bloodiest (2022)
- Season II (2025)

== See also ==
- Formula One sponsorship liveries (Brabham)

== Bibliography ==
- 聖飢魔Ⅱ30th Anniversary ゼノン石川和尚／ライデン湯澤殿下 Guitar Magazine Special Edition (in Japanese). Rittor Music. December 9, 2015. ISBN 978-4845627141.
- 聖飢魔II 30th Anniversary ルーク篁参謀／ジェイル大橋代官 Guitar Magazine Special Edition (in Japanese). Rittor Music. December 9, 2015. ISBN 978-4845627134.
