= ESP SV =

Series of electric guitars

The ESP SV is a series of electric guitars produced by ESP.

The ESP SV is a series that is only produced for the Japanese and European market. Notable users of models in the SV Series include Alexi Laiho of Children of Bodom, Kai Hansen of Gamma Ray, Mike Spreitzer of DevilDriver, and Circuit.V.Panther formerly of Sex Machineguns. The ESP SV design is similar to that of the Jackson Randy Rhoads; distinguishing features are the tummy cut on the rear of the guitar and hand cutout where the neck joins the body (the SV is also larger than the Randy Rhoads).

Products in the series include:

- ESP SV Standard
- ESP SV-I Standard NT
- ESP SV-II Standard
- ESP SV-285
- ESP SV-320

== ESP SV Standard ==
The ESP SV Standard neck-thru body construction in a 25.5" scale. The fingerboard features dot inlays with the model name at the 12th fret. It has 24 extra jumbo frets. It comes in black with white pin stripe and white with black pinstripe. It has one volume and a 3-way toggle switch.

- Other Specs
  - Body Wood: Alder
  - Neck Wood: Maple
  - Fingerboard Wood: Ebony with white binding
  - Pickups: EMG 81 (Bridge)/EMG 81 (Neck)
  - Bridge: Floyd Rose Original

== ESP SV-I Standard NT ==
The ESP SV-I Standard NT neck-thru body construction in a 25.5" scale. The fingerboard features dot inlays with the model name at the 12th fret. It has 24 extra jumbo frets. It comes in black. It has one volume.

- Other Specs
  - Body Wood: Alder
  - Neck Wood: Maple
  - Fingerboard Wood: Ebony
  - Pickups: EMG 81 (Bridge)
  - Bridge: Tune-o-Matic with String-thru-body

== ESP SV-285 ==
The ESP SV-285 neck-thru body construction in a 25.5" scale. The fingerboard features dot inlays. It has 24 extra jumbo frets. It comes in black. It has one volume and a 3-way toggle switch.

- Other Specs
  - Body Wood: Alder
  - Neck Wood: 3-piece Maple
  - Fingerboard Wood: Ebony with white binding
  - Pickups: Seymour Duncan SH-1n (Neck)/Seymour Duncan SH-4 (Bridge)
  - Bridge: Tune-o-Matic String-thru-body

== ESP SV-320 ==
The ESP SV-285 neck-thru body construction in a 25.5" scale. The fingerboard features dot inlays. It has 24 extra jumbo frets. It comes in black. It has one volume and a 3-way toggle switch.

- Other Specs
  - Body Wood: Alder
  - Neck Wood: 3-piece Maple
  - Fingerboard Wood: Ebony with white binding
  - Pickups: Seymour Duncan SH-1n (Neck)/Seymour Duncan SH-4 (Bridge)
  - Bridge: Floyd Rose Original

== See also ==
- ESP Guitars
- ESP Alexi Laiho
