= Yahiro =

- Pronunciation: jaçiɾo (IPA)
- Gender: Male

Origin
- Origin: Japanese
- Meaning: Different meanings depending on the kanji used

Yahiro is both a masculine Japanese given name and a Japanese surname.

== Written forms ==
Yahiro can be written using different combinations of kanji characters. Here are some examples:

- 弥弘, "more and more, vast"
- 弥広, "more and more, wide"
- 弥博, "more and more, doctor"
- 弥裕, "more and more, abundant"
- 弥浩, "more and more, vast"
- 弥洋, "more and more, ocean"
- 弥比呂, "more and more, compare, backbone"
- 弥宏, "more and more, wide"
- 彌弘, "more and more, vast"
- 彌廣, "more and more, wide"
- 八尋, "eight, inquire"
- 八弘, "eight, vast"
- 八洋, "eight, ocean"
- 八博, "eight, doctor"
- 野弘, "field, vast"
- 野大, "field, big"

The name can also be written in hiragana やひろ or katakana ヤヒロ.

== Notable people with the given name Yahiro ==
- Yahiro Kazama (風間 八宏; born 1961), Japanese footballer and manager

== Notable people with the surname Yahiro ==
- Fuji Yahiro (八尋 不二; 1904–1986), Japanese screenwriter
- Yoshikazu Yahiro (八尋 義和; born 1970), Japanese guitarist

== See also ==
- Yahiro Station, a railway station in Sumida, Tokyo, Japan
