= SV =

SV, Sv, sv, etc. may refer to:

== Computing, arts, and media ==
- Starting variable, or initialization vector, in cryptography
- .sv, a filename extension of SystemVerilog files
- .sv, the Internet country code top-level domain for El Salvador
- Pokémon Scarlet and Violet, Pokémon video games released in 2022
- Synthesizer V, a singing voice synthesis software
- ESP SV, a series of electric guitars
- Stattkus-Verzeichnis, a catalogue of the musical works of Claudio Monteverdi
- Significantly viewed out-of-market television stations in the United States, a classification for television stations
- sub verbo or sub voce, a Latin phrase, 'under the word/heading'

== Places ==
=== Countries ===
- El Salvador, ISO 3166-1 country code SV
- Svalbard, Norway, FIPS country code SV
- South Vietnam, an extinct state

=== Regions ===
- Silicon Valley, a region in northern California noted for high tech and social media companies
- Spokane Valley, a valley in Washington state
  - Spokane Valley, Washington a city in the United States
- Province of Savona, (vehicle registration plate code), Italy

== Politics ==
- Slovaks Forward (Slováci vpred), a political party in Serbia
- Socialist Left Party (Norway), a political party
- Sovereign Power (Latvia) (Suverēnā vara), a political party in Latvia
- Supplementary vote, an electoral system

== Science ==
- Sievert, symbol Sv, a unit of ionizing radiation dose
- Stroke volume, in cardiovascular physiology
- Svedberg unit, symbol S or Sv, a non-metric unit for sedimentation coefficient
- Sverdrup, symbol Sv, a non-SI unit of flow

== Sports ==
- Save (baseball), abbreviated SV
- Sportverein ("sports club"), for example Hamburger SV
- Save percentage, SV%, a statistic in many sports

== Transportation ==
- Silver Line (Washington Metro)
- Saudia, Saudi Arabian Airlines, IATA code SV
- Società Veneta, an Italian public transport company
- Farizon SV, a battery electric van
- MG XPower SV, a sports car by MG Rover
- Lamborghini SV, for Super Veloce
- S-V, a stage of the Saturn I rocket
- Sailing Vessel, ship name prefix SV or S/V

== Other uses ==
- Shareholder value
- Skagway Village, a federally recognized Alaska Native tribe
- Swedish language, ISO 639-1 language code sv
