= Heavy Metal Thunder =

Heavy Metal Thunder may refer to:

- Heavy Metal Thunder (Saxon album), by the British band Saxon
- Heavy Metal Thunder (Sex Machineguns album), by the Japanese band Sex Machineguns
- Heavy Metal Thunder (video game), by the Japanese company Square Enix
- "Born to Be Wild", a 1968 song by Steppenwolf, the lyrics contain the line "I like smoke and lightning, Heavy Metal Thunder"
