= Demon Kakka =

Japanese musician and entertainer

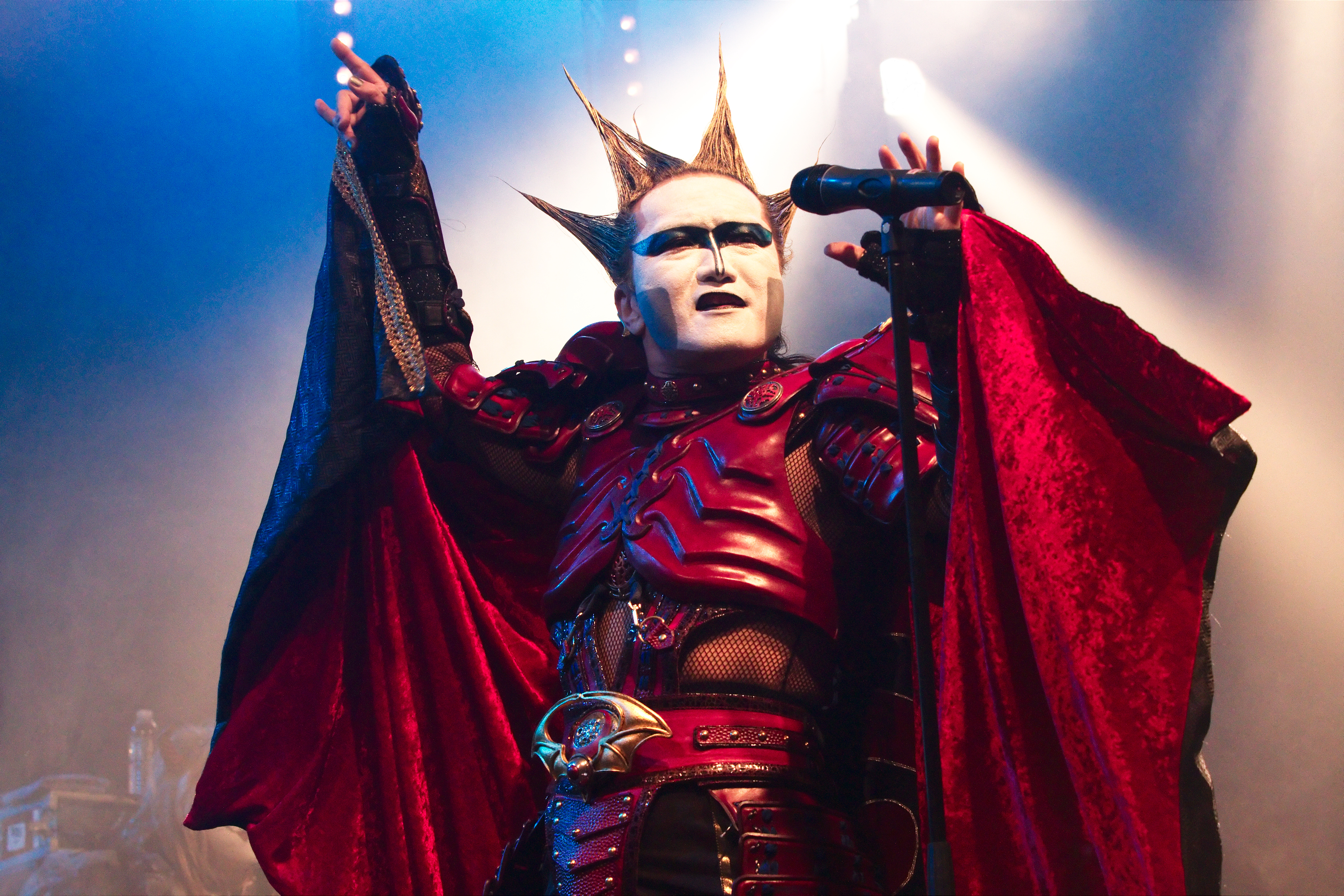
- Demon Kakka at Japan Expo 2010 in Paris, France.

Background information
- Also known as: Demon Kogure, Demon Kogure Kakka, Den'emon Kogure, !
- Born: November 10
- Origin: Shinjuku, Tokyo, Japan
- Genres: Heavy metal; hard rock; pop
- Occupations: Singer, songwriter, actor, voice actor, author, television and radio personality, record producer, critic
- Instrument: Vocals
- Years active: 1982–present
- Labels: Fitzbeat/CBS Sony, Ki/oon, Ariola Japan, BMG Japan, Avex Trax
- Member of: Seikima-II
- Website: Official site

Demon Kakka (Japanese: デーモン閣下, Hepburn: Dēmon Kakka; "His Excellency Demon"), previously known as Demon Kogure (デーモン小暮, Dēmon Kogure), is a Japanese musician, songwriter, entertainer, journalist, sumo commentator, actor and voice actor. He first gained fame in the 1980s as vocalist of the heavy metal band Seikima-II, before starting a solo career in 1990 and branching out into other forms of entertainment. His real name is not publicly known and he is noted for always working entirely in character, which includes wearing face paint. In 2018, readers and professional musicians voted Demon the third best vocalist in the history of hard rock and heavy metal in We Rock magazine's "Metal General Election".

== Early life and education ==
Demon attended kindergarten up through his first year of elementary school in New York City. He moved to Tokyo for second grade of elementary school, before moving to Nishi-ku, Hiroshima in 1971 for three years. Returning to Tokyo, Demon grew up there from 6th grade on.

Between 1982 and 1983, Demon attended an acting school in Tokyo.

In March 1986, Demon graduated with honors from Waseda University with a degree in social science. A fan of sumo since childhood, he was a member of the university's sumo club. He was also a member of their folk song club.

== Career ==
=== Music ===
When Sunplaza Nakano-kun left the Waseda University rock band Super Slump to form Bakufu Slump, Demon replaced him as vocalist.

Demon and fellow Waseda University student Damian Hamada formed the heavy metal band Seikima-II in December 1982. The band saw numerous lineup changes in their career, with Demon being the only constant member. They signed to CBS/Sony and released their first album Seikima II – Akuma ga Kitarite Heavy Metal in 1985. Seikima-II went on to release 12 studio albums and sell over 10 million records. In accordance to their fictional "prophecy" and after completing their "world conquest", Seikima-II disbanded at the end of the century on December 31, 1999 at 23:59:59. They have held various limited time reunions since 2005, and released their first album of new material in 23 years in 2022.

Demon released his first solo album in 1990, and after Seikima-II disbanded focused on his solo career.

In March 1993, Demon appeared on Larry King Live, becoming the first Japanese musician to do so.

In January 2007, Demon released Girls' Rock, a cover album of rock songs by female artists. He released a follow-up, Girls' Rock √ Hakurai, in January 2008 and supported it with a national tour from April to May. A third female rock cover album, Girls' Rock ~Tiara~, was released on February 11, 2009. The compilation album Girls' Rock Best, collecting songs from these three albums and some new covers, was released on January 20, 2010.

Demon released Mythology, his first original studio album in nine years, on May 16, 2012. It features several guests, including Yuki Koyanagi and May J., and a song composed by Tetsuya Komuro. The album's June tour featured Koyanagi at every date, while its final day also saw the other contributors perform.

Demon wrote and composed the 2013 song "Heavy Metal Strikes Back ~Chimamire no Messiah-tachi~" (HEAVY METAL STRIKES BACK ～血まみれの救世主（メサイア）たち～) for the idol group Kamen Rider Girls.

For his March 2017 album Existence, Demon had two Akutagawa Prize winning authors (Keisuke Hada and Yū Nagashima) and Terra Formars author Yū Sasuga write song lyrics. His November 2017 album Utadama was built around folk instruments, pianos and other unplugged instruments and includes covers of songs such as "Furusato" and "Kimigayo".

His November 2019 album Uta Dokuro: Gekida☆Shinkansen Gekichūka-shū is a collaboration with the theater company Gekida☆Shinkansen, with whom he has written lyrics for and performed songs with since at least 1995. The album features Demon singing 12 songs he wrote for the company's plays over the last 24 years with some altered lyrics.

Demon collaborated with Arika Takarano (Ali Project) for the May 13, 2020 single "Jikū no Mayoi Hito" (時空の迷い人), which is the opening theme of the anime adaptation of The 8th Son? Are You Kidding Me?. That same year, he provided the song "Naked Men Miro, Hadaka no Oretachi o!" to the stage adaptation of Reiko Okano's sumo manga series Ryōgoku Hananishiki Tōshi.

=== Sumo ===
Demon dedicated a section of his radio program Demon Kogure no All Night Nippon to sumo. The section, called "Ōzumō wo 666-bai Tanoshimu Hōhō" (大相撲を666倍楽しむ方法), often featured interviews with active rikishi, most notably Daitetsu Tadamitsu, who became friends with Demon.

Demon wrote a column for the sumo magazine Van Van Sumo Club for 13 years, and was a regular guest commentator on the J Sports TV show Gekisen! Ōzumō for five years. But he was asked not to enter the Ryōgoku Kokugikan in costume so as not to cause a distraction, and complied. However, in 2005, Demon was asked by the Japan Sumo Association to be a guest on Dosukoi FM, the live in-house radio broadcast of sumo tournaments, and to come in costume, ending the ban.

The following year, Demon was a guest commentator for NHK's television broadcast of the January 2006 honbasho, and became the first guest to commentate an entire sumo tournament.

Demon was a guest commentator on day 8 of the January 2009 tournament alongside his close friend and former yokozuna Hiroshi Wajima. When Wajima died in December 2018, Demon sang a song he wrote at the funeral and was a pallbearer.

On day 2 of the January 2011 tournament Demon caused some controversy when he opined publicly on NHK that Kotomitsuki Keiji, who was expelled by the JSA in July 2010 for gambling, should be reinstated.

In April 2012, Demon's alma mater Waseda University appointed him a special counselor of their sumo club which was struggling to recruit new members.

=== Other activities ===
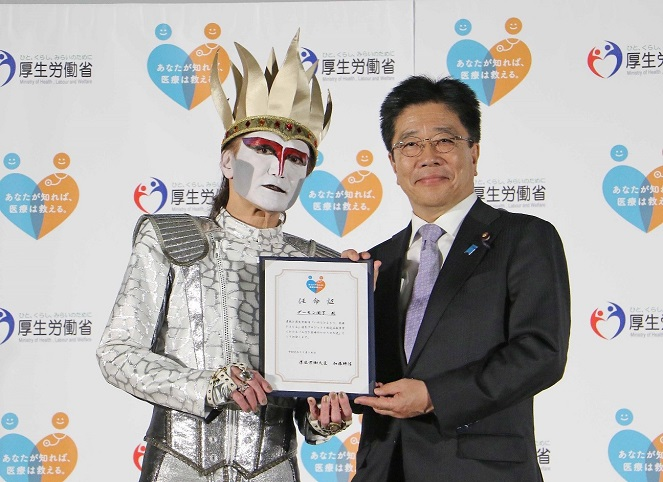
Demon Kakka being appointed an ambassador for good medical care by Katsunobu Katō (2019)

Demon hosted the weekly radio program Demon Kogure no All Night Nippon (デーモン小暮のオールナイトニッポン) on Mondays from 25:00 to 27:00 (technically Tuesday mornings) on National Radio Network from April 6, 1987 to May 14, 1990 as part of All Night Nippon.

In 2008, Demon wrote, directed and acted in the short film Kona Nishite Fū (コナ・ニシテ・フウ).

Demon voiced the character Zatan in the 2012 Kamen Rider × Kamen Rider Wizard & Fourze: Movie War Ultimatum film. He also wrote and performed its theme song, "Forest of Rocks".

In 2017, Demon was selected by the Ministry of Internal Affairs and Communications to educate the public on and bring awareness to the harm of illegal radio waves.

In February 2018, Demon took part in a symposium alongside singer Kaori Kishitani, athlete Dai Tamesue and the representative director of the Federation of Music Producers Japan speaking on the problem of ticket scalping. That year Demon provided the voice of the character Dr. Tetsuji Kanie in the anime adaptation of Hinomaru Sumo.

In 2019, Demon was appointed an ambassador for good medical care by the Ministry of Health, Labour and Welfare.

Demon leant his voice to Capcom's 2023 video game Street Fighter 6 as a real time commentator for fights.

== Persona ==
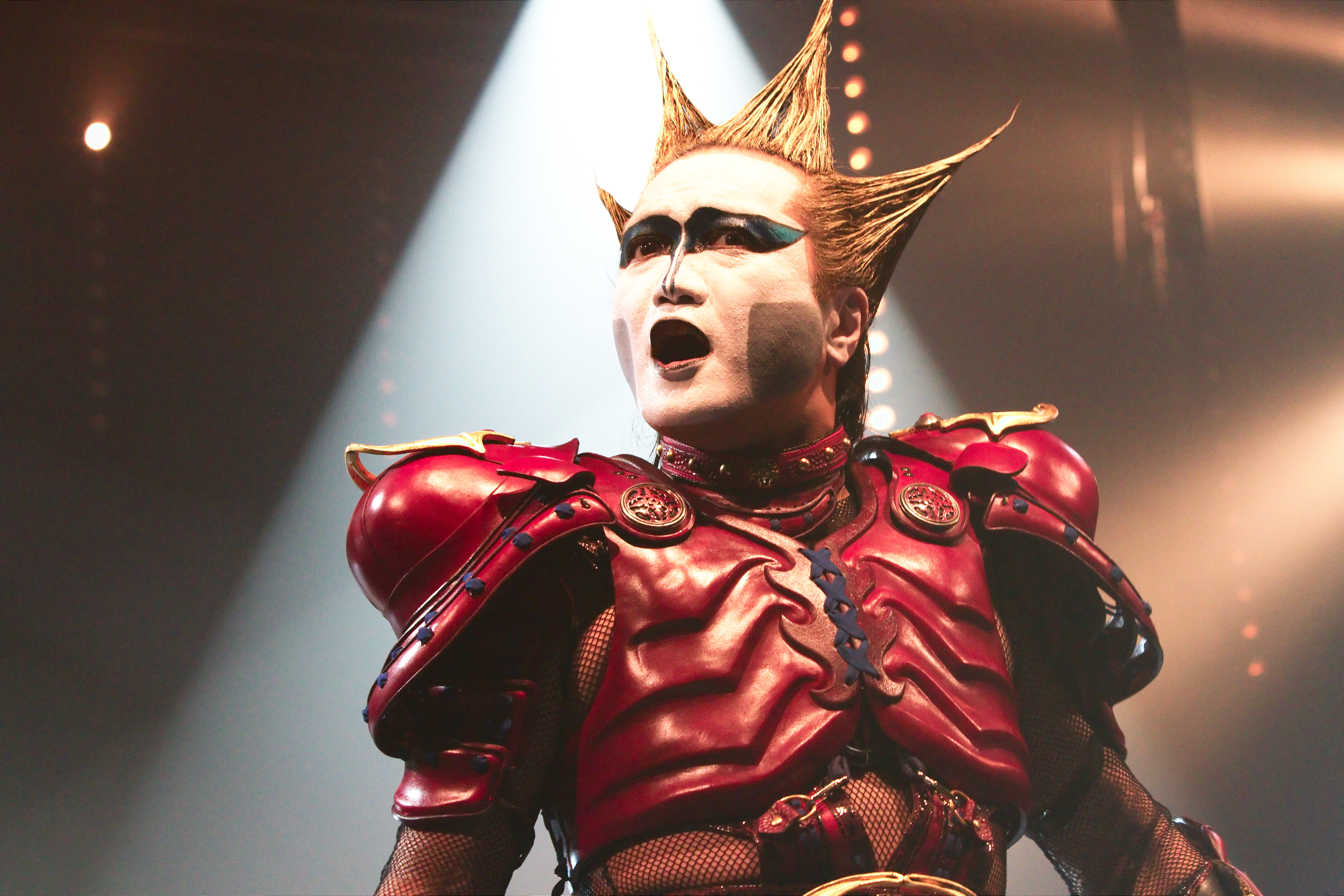
Demon Kakka wears face paint and elaborate costumes to convey his persona of a demon.

Like the other members of Seikima-II, Demon adopted the stage persona of an Akuma ("demon") from the futuristic hyper-evolved dimension Makai ("demon world"), where he was the former Vice Emperor. They all wear face paint and elaborate stage outfits. The band preaches a demonic religion called Akumakyō through heavy metal music to conquer the Earth. Originally using the name Demon Kogure (デーモン小暮), he began using Demon Kogure Kakka (デーモン小暮閣下) in 2000, and in 2010 changed his name to Demon Kakka. He has also released material under the name Kogure Den-emon (小暮伝衛門) and the symbol !, which is read as "Exclamation".

On December 10, 2014, a supporter of politician Daisuke Sakamoto (Party for Japanese Kokoro) dressed as Demon during a public event supporting Sakamoto in the 2014 Japanese general election to represent Hiroshima 7th district. When news of the cosplay spread on the internet and TV, Demon wrote a blog post stating that because it was not made clear that it was a fake, any similar acts in the future would result in legal action. Sakamoto apologized stating that it was a "careless" decision.

== Discography ==
=== Studio albums ===
Release date	Title	Name holder	Record label	Oricon
April 21, 1990	Kōshoku Yorozu Goe Otoko (好色萬声男)	Kogure Den-emon (小暮伝衛門)	Fitzbeat/CBS Sony	7
September 21, 1995	Demon as Bad Man	Demon Kogure	Ki/oon Records	—
October 25, 2000	Astrodynamics	! [Exclamation]	Ariola Japan	—
February 14, 2002	Symphonia	His Excellency Demon Kogure	BMG Japan	—
October 8, 2003	When the Future Loves the Past: Mirai ga Kako wo Aisurutoki (WHEN THE FUTURE LOVES THE PAST 〜未来が過去を愛するとき〜)	His Excellency Demon Kogure	BMG Japan	—
January 24, 2007	Girls' Rock	Demon Kogure	Avex Trax	29
January 30, 2008	Girls' Rock √ Hakurai	Demon Kogure	Avex Trax	40
February 11, 2009	Girls' Rock ~Tiara~	Demon Kogure	Avex Trax	22
May 16, 2012	Mythology	Demon Kakka	Avex Trax	22
March 15, 2017	Existence	H.E. Demon Kakka	Ariola Japan	23
November 8, 2017	Utadama (うただま)	Demon Kakka	Ariola Japan	23
October 16, 2019	Uta Dokuro: Gekida☆Shinkansen Gekichūka-shū (うた髑髏 -劇団☆新感線劇中歌集-)	Demon Kakka	Ariola Japan	16

=== Singles ===
Release date	Title	Name holder	Record label	Oricon
August 21, 1995	"Love Romance"	Demon Kogure	Ki/oon Records	—
September 20, 2000	"Age of Zero!"	! [Exclamation]	BMG Japan	—
January 14, 2009	"Atsuku Nare" (熱くなれ)	Demon Kogure	Avex Trax	39
December 12, 2012	"Forest of Rocks"	Demon Kakka	Avex Trax	43
December 4, 2019	"Neo"	H.E. Demon Kakka	Ariola Japan	33
September 15, 2020	"Naked Men Miro, Hadaka no Oretachi o!" (Naked Men 見ろ、裸の俺たちを！)	Demon Kakka	Toho Village	—

=== Compilation albums ===
Release date	Title	Name holder	Record label	Oricon
June 8, 2005	Le Monde de Demon	小暮伝衛門 (Kogure Den-emon), ! [Exclamation], His Excellency Demon Kogure	BMG Japan	—
January 20, 2010	Girls' Rock Best	H.E. Demon Kakka	Avex Trax	53

=== Home videos ===
Release date	Title	Record label	Oricon DVDs
December 12, 1993	Enkai Daiō: His Excellency Demon Kogure Dinner Show (宴会大王 〜デーモン小暮閣下ディナーショー〜)	Ki/oon Records	—
April 26, 2006	Demon Kogure: "In The Naked Lens"	BMG Japan	175
September 26, 2007	Demon's Rock Show!	Avex Trax	87
September 24, 2008	√ Hakurai Culture Rock Show!	Avex Trax	90
January 20, 2010	Demon's Rock Expo ~The Live~	Avex Trax	86

=== Other work ===
Release year	Song	Artist	Album/Single
1987	"Rolling Boys in Town"	Ooe Senri (大江千里)	1234
1988	"Koi no Benchi Shīto" (恋のベンチシート)	Koizumi Kyouko (小泉今日子)	Natsumero (ナツメロ)
1991	"We are the Sakanaya no Ossan '91" (WE ARE THE 魚屋のおっさん'91)	Kamon Tatsuo (嘉門達夫)	Utage (宴)
1992	"Venus"	Ami Ozaki (尾崎亜美)	Points-3
1993	"Meikai ~ Hokuto Akira (Zenjyo) he Sasagu" (冥界～北斗晶〈全女〉へ捧ぐ)	unknown	Kokoro no Puroresu ~Kagayakeru Birei no Kakutou Senshi Tachi he Sasagu~ (心のプロレス~輝ける美麗の格闘戦士達へ捧ぐ~)
1995	"Maō" (魔王)	Sugiura Philharmonia Orchestra (杉浦フィルハーモニーオーケストラ)	To on Kigou (ト音記号)
1995	"Akuma" (悪魔)	unknown	Ofu.Ofu.Mazaaguusu (オフ・オフ・マザーグース)
1996	"Kanata Kara no Tegami" (彼方からの手紙)	Eri Hiramatsu (平松愛里)	Reborn
1996	"Shitsu Rakuen wa Futatabi" (失楽園はふたたび)	Damian Hamada (ダミアン浜田)	Shou ma Kyou (照魔鏡)
1999	"Man on the Silver Mountain"	Various artists	Super Rock Summit Rainbow Eyes
2001	"Wisdom of Nature"	Ami Ozaki (尾崎亜美)	Amii-Phonic
2002	"F-U-C-K" (エフ・ユー・シー・ケー, Efu・Yū・Shī・Kē)	Various artists	Skill and a Shout It Lets Out
2006	"L←→R"	Various artists	Death Note Tribute
2007	"Under My Martial Law"	MCU	A.K.A
2009	"Tada Kogoeru Elegy ~The Theme of Freeza~" (ただ凍える挽歌〜The Theme Of FREEZA〜)	Various artists	Dragon Ball Kai Song Collection
2010	"Dāmījō no Kyūketsu Akuma (Wara)" (ダーミー城の吸血悪魔(笑))	Damijaw	Muryoku na Jibun ga Yurusenai (無力な自分が許せない)
2010	"Search For Light"	Grand Illusion	Brand New World
2010	"Time to Turn Over"	Takashi O'Hashi	Independent Souls Union
2012	"Forest of Rocks (Movie Edit.)"	Various artists	Kamen Rider × Kamen Rider Wizard & Fourze: Movie War Ultimatum Original Soundtrack
2012	"Karappo no Heya -Reset to Zero-" (空っぽの部屋-RESET TO ZERO-)	Various artists	Another Sound of 009 Re:Cyborg
2013	"Osharena Tokyo Tower" (おしゃれな東京タワー)	Various artists	Bakufu Tribute Complete
2013	"Nameko no Uta (Jigoku no Nameko no Uta)" (なめこのうた（地獄のなめこのうた）)	Various artists	Nameko no CD 2 (なめこのCD2)
2016	"I See the Light featuring Demon Kakka and Jeff Watson"	D-Metal Stars	Metal Disney
2016	"Toki no Sugiyuku Mama ni" (時の過ぎゆくままに)	Various artists	"Concrete Revolutio: Chojin Genso The Last Song (Anime)" COMPOSITE ALBUM
2018	"Midoshi no Pelican" (巳年のぺリカン)	Darjeeling	8 Shin Futaba ~ Baiō Blend (8芯二葉～梅鶯Blend)
2019	"Wasa Wasa Wasa!" (わさわさわさ！)	Various artists	"Kedama no Gonjiro" (けだまのゴンじろー)

== Video games ==
Release year	Game	Console	Notes
1986	Seikima II Akuma no Gyakushū! (聖飢魔II 悪魔の逆襲！)	Famicom, MSX2	Demon plays the main character who needs to save his band members in four areas.
1989	DJ Boy	Arcade	Demon voices the DJ in the Japanese version of the game.
1993	Akuma no Shinpan (悪魔の審判)	Pioneer LaserActive	Demon appears in this game.
1996	G.O.D ~Mezame yoto Yobu Koe ga Kikoe~ (G・O・D～目覚めよと呼ぶ声が聴こえ～)	Nintendo Super Famicom	Demon composed the entire soundtrack for the game.
1996	Momotarō Dōchūki (桃太郎道中記)	Sega Saturn	Demon wrote music for one of the characters.
1998	Rudra no Hihō	Nintendo Super Famicom	unknown
1998	G.O.D Pure	Sony PlayStation	Demon wrote music for this game.
1998	Sankyo Fever Jissen Shimyureeshon (SANKYO FEVER実践シミュレーション 3)	Sony PlayStation	Demon voices some characters for this game.
2009	Trick x Logic Season 1	Sony PSP	Demon voices one of main characters for this game.
2009	Trick x Logic Season 2	Sony PSP	Demon voices one of main characters for this game.
2023	Street Fighter 6	PlayStation 5, PlayStation 4, Xbox Series X/S, Microsoft Windows	Demon voices a fight commentator for this game.

== Filmography ==
Year	Title	Character/role
1986	Wanna-Be's	Himself
1989	Godzilla vs. Biollante	Himself
1989	Batman	Joker (Jack Nicholson) (Japanese dub voice)
1990	Urotsukidoji II: Legend of the Demon Womb	Münchhausen II
1992	Humane Society	Himself
2003	Jibun Nari (ジブンナリ 〜自分「成り」〜)	unknown
2008	Kona Nishite Fū (コナ・ニシテ・フウ)	Himself, also writer and director of this short film
2012	Kamen Rider × Kamen Rider Wizard & Fourze: Movie War Ultimatum	Zatan (voice)
2018	Hinomaru Sumo	Dr. Tetsuji Kanie (voice)

== Bibliography ==
Year	Title	Publisher	Notes
1987	Ware ha Motome Uttaetari (我は求め訴えたり)	NESCO	
1988	10 Kai Quiz Chigaune (10回クイズちがうね)	NBS	A book with a cassette tape
1988	Demon Kogure no Shiken ni deru Nurarihyon Daigaku Nyuushi Series (デーモン小暮の試験に出るぬらりひょん 大学入試シリーズ)	NBS	
1993	Akuma no Ningen Gaku (悪魔の人間学)	Madra	
1994	Demon Ohken no Hustle! Ganryu Jima (デーモン・オーケンのハッスル巌流島)	NBS	
2015	Katte ni Ozumo Shingikai (勝手に大相撲審議会)	TBD	
2016	Demon Kakka Akuma Teki Kasho Ron (デーモン閣下悪魔的歌唱論)	Rittor Music	
