= Live! Final Attack at Budokan =

Live album by Sex Machineguns
- Released: September 26, 2003
- Genre: Heavy metal
- Length: 111:12
- Label: Toshiba EMI

Sex Machineguns chronology
To The Future Tracks (2003)	Live! Final Attack at Budokan (2003)	Heavy Metal Thunder (2005)

Live! Final Attack at Budokan is the second live album by the Japanese heavy metal band Sex Machineguns. It was released on September 26, 2003, in Japan only. As the title suggests, it was recorded at the world-famous Nippon Budokan arena in Tokyo, Japan. The album is a two disc collection of songs from their first 4 studio albums.

== Track listing ==
=== Disc one ===
1. Introduction
2. Tabetai Nametai Kiken Chitai / Wanna Eat, Lick Your Danger Zone
3. Fami-res Bomber / Family Restaurant Bomber
4. Japan
5. Pheromone
6. Onigunsow
7. A Siren
8. Akumano Kenshin / Devilish Incarnation
9. Sokoni Anataga / There You Are
10. Iron Cross
11. S.H.R. -Sexy Hero Revolution-

=== Disc two ===
1. Gyakufuu / Against the Wind
2. Good Vibrations
3. Burn
4. Sakurajima
5. Fire
6. Mikan No Uta / The Orange Song
7. Scorpion Death Rock
8. German Power
9. Sex Machinegun
