= Lamborghini SV =

Lamborghini SV may refer to:

- Lamborghini Aventador SV
- Lamborghini Diablo SV
- Lamborghini Miura SV
- Lamborghini Murcielago SV

== See also ==
- Lamborghini
- SV (disambiguation)
