= Seikima-II discography =

Discography of the Japanese heavy metal band

The discography of the Japanese heavy metal band Seikima-II consists of 14 studio albums, 11 live albums, 29 singles and numerous compilations, many of which feature re-recordings.

Formed in 1982, Seikima-II released 12 studio albums before disbanding in 1999. Their first, Seikima-II - Akuma ga Kitarite Heavy Metal, was released in 1985, reached number 48 on the Oricon chart and marked the first time a Japanese metal band sold over 100,000 copies. Their second, The End of the Century, was released the following year, reached number 5 and sold over 200,000 copies. The 1989 compilation of re-recordings, Worst, was the first Japanese metal album to reach number one on the chart. In total, the group has sold over 10 million records in Japan alone.

Seikima-II have had several limited-time reunions since 2005. Although live albums were typically recorded and released from these reunions, re-recordings such as the Akuma Nativity "Songs of the Sword" (2009) and Akuma Relativity (2010) albums and all new double A-side singles "Kōryōtaru Shin Sekai / Planet/The Hell" and "Noroi no Shananana / Goblin's Scale" (both 2016) have also been released. In 2022 the band released Bloodiest, their first album of new material in 23 years.

== Studio albums ==
Title	Release date	Label	Oricon
Seikima II - Akuma ga Kitarite Heavy Metal (聖飢魔II〜悪魔が来たりてヘヴィメタる)	September 21, 1985	Fitzbeat (CBS Sony)	48
The End of the Century	April 2, 1986	Fitzbeat (CBS Sony)	5
From Hell with Love (地獄より愛をこめて)	November 21, 1986	Fitzbeat (CBS Sony)	8
Big Time Changes	November 21, 1987	Fitzbeat (CBS Sony)	9
The Outer Mission	December 9, 1988	Fitzbeat (CBS Sony)	7
Yūgai (有害)	September 9, 1990	Fitzbeat (CBS Sony)	5
Kyōfu no Restaurant (恐怖のレストラン)	October 21, 1992	Fitzbeat (CBS Sony)	8
Ponk!!	July 1, 1994	Fitzbeat (CBS Sony)	11
Mephistopheles no Shōzō (メフィストフェレスの肖像)	September 21, 1996	Ariola (BMG Japan)	19
News	July 2, 1997	Ariola (BMG Japan)	45
Move	July 23, 1998	Ariola (BMG Japan)	30
Living Legend	October 21, 1999	Ariola (BMG Japan)	14
Bloodiest	September 21, 2022	Ariola (Sony Music Direct)	4
Season II	June 6, 2025	Ariola Japan	6

== Compilation albums ==
Title	Release date	Label	Oricon	Notes
Worst	September 21, 1989	Fitzbeat (CBS Sony)	1	Re-recordings and remixes
Ai to Gyakusatsu no Hibi [Rekidaiko Kyōten Taizen] (愛と虐殺の日々 [歴代小教典大全])	December 13, 1991	Fitzbeat (Sony)	16	Collects singles released between 1986 and 1991
1999 Black List	May 21, 1999	Ariola (BMG Japan)	14	Mainly re-recordings
1999 Blood List	July 1, 1999	Fitzbeat (Ki/oon)	18	
Seikima-II Ko-Akuma Katsudō Dai Denbatsu (聖飢魔II 個悪魔活動大選抜)	November 3, 1999	Fitzbeat	—	Compiles songs by the members' musical projects outside of Seikima-II
Devil Bless You! ~Seikima-II Final Works~ (DEVIL BLESS YOU! 〜聖飢魔II FINAL WORKS〜)	November 22, 2000	Ariola (BMG Japan)	—	
Seikima-II Nyūmon Kyōten The Best of the Worst (聖飢魔II 入門教典 THE BEST OF THE WORST)	July 6, 2003	Ariola (BMG Japan)	—	
Akuma Nativity "Songs of the Sword"	September 16, 2009	Avex Trax	15	English re-recordings
Akuma Relativity	July 28, 2010	Avex Trax	17	English re-recordings and 4 new Japanese songs
A Quarter Century of Rebellion -Sekaiteki Gokuaku Shūtaiseiban- (A QUARTER CENTURY OF REBELLION -世界的極悪集大成盤-)	July 28, 2010	Avex Trax	38	Compiles songs from Akuma Nativity "Songs of the Sword" and Akuma Relativity plus 1 new re-recording
Ai to Gyakusatsu no Hibi ~Rekidaiko Kyōten Sony Jidai Kanzenban~ (愛と虐殺の日々〜歴代小教典 ソニー時代完全盤〜)	November 27, 2013	Sony Music Direct	102	Compiles 1991's Ai to Gyakusatsu no Hibi and the singles released since
XXX -The Ultimate Worst-	August 25, 2016	Sony Music Direct	15	

== Live albums ==
Title	Release date	Label	Oricon
Live! Black Mass in London	March 13, 1992	Fitzbeat (Sony)	18
The Black Mass Final 3 Nights	March 8, 2000	Ariola (BMG Japan)	—
The Live Black Mass B.D.3 Mephistopheles no Inbō (THE LIVE BLACK MASS B.D.3 メフィストフェレスの陰謀)	July 6, 2005	Ariola (BMG Funhouse)	—
All Standing Shokei The Live Black Mass D.C.7 (オールスタンディング処刑 THE LIVE BLACK MASS D.C.7)	March 29, 2006	Ariola (BMG Japan)	45
Kyōfu no Fukkatsu-sai The Black Mass D.C.7 Selection +α (恐怖の復活祭 THE LIVE BLACK MASS D.C.7 SELECTION +α)	May 24, 2006	Ariola (BMG Japan)	35
ICBM Osaka -Yōen! + Shinkan! + Bakushō! = Kyūkyoku Enjō!!- (ICBM OSAKA -妖艶!+震撼!+爆笑!=究極炎上!!-)	March 2, 2011	Avex Trax	30
Tribute to Japan - The Benefit Black Mass 2 Days, D.C.13 -	June 20, 2012	Avex Trax	52
121212 -Saishūketsu Dai Kuro Misa- (121212 -再集結大黒ミサ-)	December 12, 2012	Avex Trax	91
Zenseki Shikei -Live Black Mass Tokyo- (全席死刑 -LIVE BLACK MASS 東京-)	April 13, 2016	Ariola	13
Zoku Zenseki Shikei -Live Black Mass Osaka- (続・全席死刑 -LIVE BLACK MASS 大阪-)	July 27, 2016	Ariola	23
Jigoku no Saishin Seikyū -Live Black Mass Budōkan- (地獄の再審請求 -LIVE BLACK MASS武道館-)	October 23, 2016	Ariola	24

== Singles ==
Title	Release date	Oricon
"Rōningyō no Yakata" (蠟人形の館)	April 2, 1986	17
"Adam no Ringo" (アダムの林檎)	November 1, 1986	29
"El・Do・Ra・Do"	March 21, 1987	39
"1999 Secret Object"	November 21, 1987	33
"Stainless Night"	May 21, 1988	17
"Big Time Surrender"	July 21, 1988	84
"Winner!"	October 21, 1988	11
"Shiroi Kiseki" (白い奇蹟)	August 2, 1989	12
"Bad Again ~Utsukushiki Hangyaku~" (BAD AGAIN 〜美しき反逆〜)	February 1, 1990	5
"Yūgai Rock" (有害ロック)	July 21, 1990	14
"Pharaoh no Yōni" (ファラオのように)	October 21, 1990	19
"Akaitama no Densetsu" (赤い玉の伝説)	January 21, 1991	12
"Natsuyasumi" (夏休み)	July 25, 1991	12
"Seigi no Tame ni" (正義のために)	July 1, 1992	26
"Mangetsu no Yoru" (満月の夜)	September 21, 1992	19
"Sekaiichi no Kuchizuke o" (世界一のくちづけを)	October 21, 1993	21
"Teenage Dream"	June 6, 1994	35
"Tatakau Nihonjin" (闘う日本人)	June 6, 1994	33
"Akaitama no Densetsu (Remastered Version)" (赤い玉の伝説（リマスター・ヴァージョン）)	July 21, 1990	—
"Yajū" (野獣)	May 22, 1996	56
"Akuma no Merry Christmas (Seishun-hen)" (悪魔のメリークリスマス（青春編）)	December 13, 1996	39
"Brand New Song"	April 23, 1997	36
"Mahiru no Tsuki ~Moon at Mid Day~" (真昼の月〜MOON AT MID DAY〜)	June 21, 1997	57
"Sora no Shizuku" (空の雫)	April 22, 1998	45
"Masquerade"	July 3, 1998	52
"Rōningyō no Yakata '99" (蠟人形の館 '99)	April 21, 1999	28
"20 Seiki Kyōshikyoku" (20世紀狂詩曲)	September 22, 1999	26
"Kōryōtaru Shin Sekai / Planet/The Hell" (荒涼たる新世界/PLANET / THE HELL)	April 13, 2016	12
"Noroi no Shananana / Goblin's Scale" (呪いのシャ・ナ・ナ・ナ/GOBLIN'S SCALE)	June 15, 2016	11
