= Heavy Metal Thunder (Sex Machineguns album) =

Studio album by Sex Machineguns
- Released: March 2, 2005
- Genre: Heavy metal
- Length: 50:00
- Label: Toshiba EMI

Sex Machineguns chronology
Live! Final Attack at Budokan (2003)	Heavy Metal Thunder (2005)	Made in USA (2006)

Heavy Metal Thunder is the 9th studio album by the Japanese heavy metal band The Sex Machineguns. It was released in 2005, in Japan only. The title track was the theme song to the PS2 video game by the same name, which the band had a key supporting role in.

== Track listing ==
1. Heavy Metal Thunder
2. 伝説のキャッチボール
  Densetsu no Kyacchibōru/Legendary Catchball
3. 焼き肉パーティー
  Yakiniku Pātī/Yakiniku Party
4. ブラジルカーニバル
  Burajiru Kānibaru/Brazil Carnival
5. サスペンス劇場
  Sasupensu Gekijô/Suspense Theater
6. パンダちゃん
  Panda-Chan
7. 踏み台昇降運動
  Fumidai Shôko Undô
8. フランケンシュタイン
  Furankenshutain/Frankenstein
9. 出前道一直線
  Demaedo Icchokusen
10. ダンシング課長
  Danshingu Kachô/Dancing Kachô
11. 4
