= Giboshi =

Japanese ornamental finial

Gibōshi (擬宝珠) is a type of ornamental finial used on Japanese railings. Gibōshi bridge ornaments resemble an onion; the ends are bulbous and typically come to a point. It is believed that the shape of gibōshi was from hōju (宝珠; "sacred gem" or "cintāmaṇi") which is used to decorate roofs. They are often found on bridges in Japanese gardens, temples and shinto shrines.

Gibōshi come in two styles: normal style and Kamakura style.

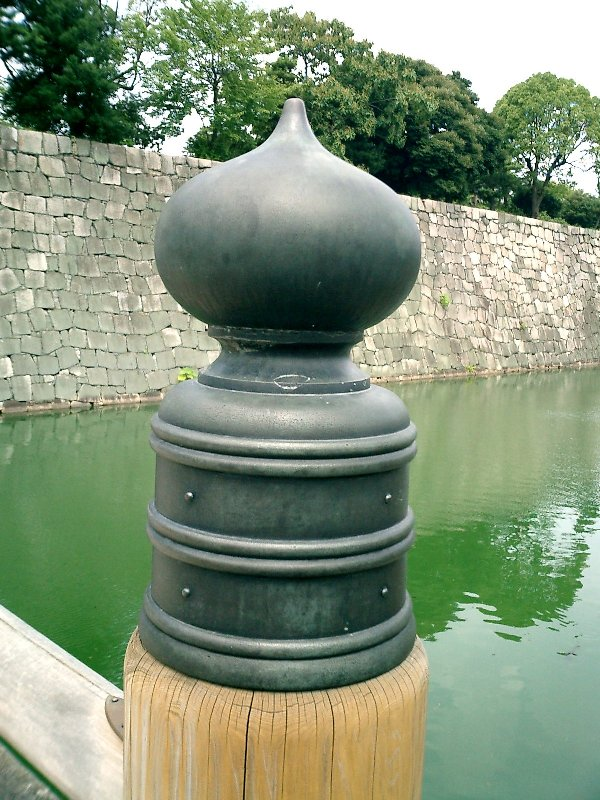
A giboshi

== See also ==
- Japanese architecture
- Glossary of Shinto
