= Seikima II Akuma no Gyakushū! =

1986 video game

- Promotional flyer
- Developer: ISCO
- Publisher: CBS Sony Group
- Platforms: Family Computer; MSX2
- Release: Family Computer: JP: December 25, 1986; MSX2: JP: 1987
- Genre: Action
- Mode: Single-player

Seikima II Akuma no Gyakushū! (聖飢魔II 悪魔の逆襲！; lit. "Seikima II The Wrath of Satan!") is a video game that was released in Japan in 1986.

In 1987, the game was re-released for the MSX2 under the title Seikima II Special (聖飢魔IIスペシャル) with more detailed sprites and backgrounds. It also featured actual Seikima-II music.

== Summary ==
The game is based on a then-popular Japanese heavy metal band formed by Damian Hamada called Seikima-II. This band lasted from its creation in 1982 to its dissolution on December 31, 1999. Their history, as it has been prophesied, is that they are a group of demons preaching a religion in order to propagate Satan through the use of Heavy Metal. Each member is a demon of a different hierarchical class with His Excellency Demon Kogure being leader of demons and His Majesty Damian Hamada being crown prince of hell. In accordance to the prophecy and after completing the world conquest, the band would disband at the end of the century on December 12, 1999, at 23:59:59 Japan Standard Time (09:59:99 Eastern Standard Time).
