= Ōsama =

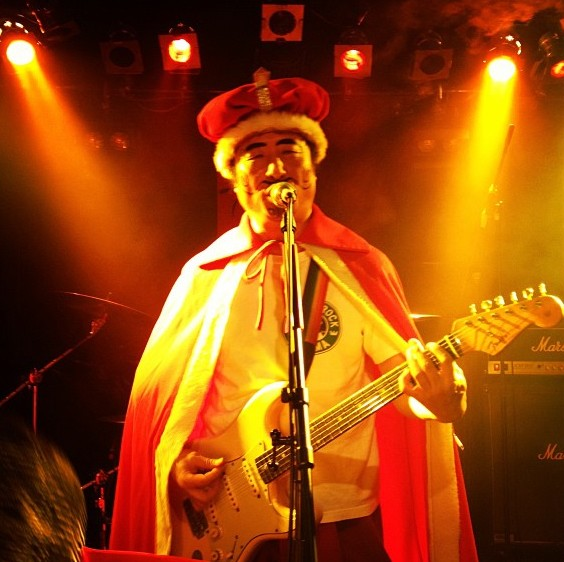
- Ōsama during a gig in Tokyo October 2012.

Background information
- Born: 7 July 1960 (age 64); Nishinomiya, Hyōgo, Japan
- Genres: Rock, alternative metal
- Instrument: Guitar
- Years active: 1995–present
- Labels: BMG, Mercury Records, Victor Entertainment
- Website: www.osama.co.jp

Ōsama (王様, Ōsama, born Ōsama Jirō (王様 治郎, Ousama Jirou)) is a Japanese musician and guitarist. He is from Nishinomiya in Hyōgo Prefecture.

== Discography ==
=== Singles ===
- Funhouse Inc. (BMG Japan)

- Hadaka no Ōsama guruguru (裸の王様グルグル) (1995)
- Happy Xmas (1996, John Lennon) (Duet with Izumiya Shigeru)

- Victor Entertainment

- Pachinko Blue (パチンコ・ブルー) (2005)

=== Albums ===
- Funhouse Inc. (BMG Japan)

- Fukamurasaki densatsu (深紫伝説, 1995, Deep Purple)
- Namari no hikōsen densatsu (鉛の飛行船伝説, 1996, Led Zeppelin)
- Tenseki densatsu (転石伝説, 1996, The Rolling Stones)
- Ōsama no ongaeshi (王様の恩返し, 1996, Omnibus)
- Hamakko densatsu (浜っ子伝説, 1996, The Beach Boys)
- Meccha yōkina tetsudō (めっちゃ陽気な鉄道伝説, 1996, Grand Funk Railroad)
- Sōgō shite goran (想像してごらん, 1996, John Lennon)
- Ōsama no takarabako (王様の宝箱, 1997, Omnibus)
- Ōsama densatsu (王様伝説, 2003, Best of)

- Mercury

- Kaettekita Ōsama no oiroke bokujō (帰ってきた王様のお色気牧場, 1998, Omnibus)
- Gorippa!! (御立派！！, 1999, Omnibus)

- Conisis Entertainment (independent)

- Seppun densatsu (接吻伝説, 2000, Kiss)
- Niji densatsu (虹伝説, 2001, Rainbow)
- Yukaina murabito tachi (ゆかいな村人たち, 2002, Village People)
- Itoshino oira/Shiro anko densatsu (いとしのオイラ/しろあんこ伝説, 2003, Eric Clapton)
- Kurisotsu densatsu (くりそつ伝説, 2008)
- Hard Rock kōza ~Vol.1~ (ハードロック講座～Vol.1～, 2010)

- Victor Entertainment

- Kabutomushi gaiden (カブトムシ外伝, 2005, music The Beatles covered)
- Kōtetsu densatsu ~kin no kan~ (鋼鉄伝説 〜金の巻〜, 2008, orthodox heavy metal cover)
  Because of rights issues with the attached DVD, production was discontinued.
- Kaettekita kōtetsu densatsu ~kin no kan~ (帰って来た鋼鉄伝説～金の巻～, 2009)
  After the album Kōtetsu densatsu ~kin no kan~ was discontinued, the music alone was remastered and sold on this album.

=== Commercial songs ===
- Banana no Ōsama! Kanjukuō (バナナの王様！甘熟王！, 2010)
