= Sex Machineguns =

Japanese heavy metal band

- Origin: Kagoshima, Japan
- Genres: Heavy metal; speed metal; thrash metal; power metal; glam metal
- Years active: 1989–1992, 1995–present
- Label: Toshiba-EMI
- Members: Anchang; Sussy; Shingo☆ Thomas
- Past members: Asada; Zaamasu; Mad Power; Noisy; Speed Star Sypan Joe; Clutch J. Himawari; Samurai W. Kenjilaw; Circuit V. Panther; Ken'ichi; Leon
- Website: Official site

Sex Machineguns (stylized as SEX MACHINEGUNS) is a Japanese heavy metal band formed in 1989. Their music is characterized by a heavy focus on bass as well as extremely fast guitar and bass solos. The band uses the image of "shock rockers" by wearing crazy, exotic outfits like visual kei bands, although this image has been toned down, especially since 2003 when the long-term bassist Noisy left the band. The lyrics feature very off-beat and non-serious themes (the superior quality of Satsuma fruits in Ehime prefecture, minor annoyance in family restaurants, etc.). In addition to their image and attitude, they also exhibit technical skill on their instruments.

== Biography ==
Sex Machineguns started in 1989 in Kagoshima as an indie group, touring live houses and clubs. Their name is intentionally similar to that of the Sex Pistols and, according to the band, "implying that [we] machineguns are more radical than [the] pistols". They gained a large fan base quickly and sold out their shows. They went on tour and spread their popularity all over Japan. Once they got back home to release their first video and live CD in spring 1997, they had developed such a fan base that the first press of the video sold out instantly, to all parts of Japan from Okinawa to Hokkaidō.

In 1998, Sex Machineguns made their commercial debut with the release of their first single on Toshiba-EMI Records: "Hanabi-la Daikaiten". The single sold out instantly, and it was decided they would go on a debut tour (which sold out in every location). Magazines began to run articles, and the "Hanabi-la Daikaiten" single sold steadily, skyrocketing the band's popularity. In September they released their first album, which was another huge hit. They went on many tours, all selling out, and topped the singles charts. As 1998 came to a close, the Sex Machineguns had topped the charts and played 62 concerts (all sold out).

The band's front-man announced that the band would be taking a "activity pause" on March 20, 2006. All members at the time except for Anchang had left the band and formed a new band/side-project called Elleguns which released a 6-track instrumental. In 2004, Clutch J. Himawari and Noisy have formed a 3-man group called Dustar-3 with Yuki (formerly of Lucifer). Later in December 2006, Circuit V. Panther, Samurai W. Kenjilaw, and Speed Star Sypan Joe have started a new band known as Cycle. Anchang later reformed Sex Machineguns in 2007 with Ryotatsu Kuwae on guitar and Kenichi Imai on drums, and they released three digital download-only singles that year.

In 2008 Anchang formed the band Big Bites, with Natchin (Siam Shade) and Annie (The Yellow Monkey). Also in 2008, some footage of the band performing was featured in the film Global Metal during a discussion about heavy metal in Japan.

On 2012, drummer Ken'ichi withdrew, and the band went to an indefinite long time hiatus.

In 2013 Anchang and Shingo☆ formed a similar band called The Maintenance☆ (ザ☆メンテナンス), with Hirota on drums and second lead guitarist Master. They released their debut album Kōji-chū (工事中) on February 21, 2013.

== Members ==
=== Current members ===
- Anchang (Koji Ando) – guitars (1989–1992, 1995–present), lead vocals (1995–present)
- Sussy (Masahito Furuya) – guitars (1995–2001, live member only 2008–present)
- Shingo☆ (Shingo Tamaki) – bass (2008–present)
- Thomas (Yuji Ohkubo) – drums (2020–present)

=== Former members ===
- Asada – vocals (1989–1992)
- Zaamasu – bass (1989–1992)
- Mad Power (Hiroshi Tsuchiya) – drums (1989–1992, 1995–1997)
- Noisy (Hiroshi Ohta) – bass, backing vocals (1995–2003)
- Speed Star Sypan Joe (Koji Ueno) – drums (1997–1999, 2004–2007)
- Clutch J. Himawari (Jun Kanki) – drums (2000–2003)
- Circuit V. Panther (Yoshikazu Yahiro) – guitars, backing vocals (2001–2007)
- Samurai W. Kenjilaw (Kenjirou Murai) – bass, backing vocals (2004–2007)
- Ken'ichi (Kenichi Imai) – drums (2008–2012)
- Leon (Leon Murasaki) – drums (2012–2019)

=== Support members (former) ===
- Cyzer A. Hamburg – synth guitar (April 2001 – August 2001)
- Crazy Horse Kameen – synth guitar (April 2001 – August 2003)
- Iberiko Moja Malmsteen (Ryotatsu Kuwae) – guitar (2007–2008)
- Ryosuke (Dragon Sue) – guitar (October 2008 – December 2008, May 2010 – September 2011)
- Takeo Shimoda – drums (February 2014 – July 2014)

== Discography ==
=== Albums ===
Title	Release date	Peak Chart Position in Japan
Sex Machinegun	October 16, 1998	29
Made in Japan	November 26, 1999	9
Barbe-Q★マイケル	March 7, 2001	7
Burning Hammer (live album)	October 31, 2001	7
Ignition	October 9, 2002	8
Machineguns no Tsudoi ("best of" compilation)	June 4, 2003	9
To the Future Tracks: Gathering for Unreleased Songs	August 6, 2003	29
Live! Final Attack at Budokan (double live album)	September 26, 2003	57
Heavy Metal Thunder	March 2, 2005	22
Made in USA	February 8, 2006	29
Best Tracks the Past and the Future	March 26, 2008	65
Cameron	October 8, 2008	39
45° Angle	October 7, 2009	34
SMG	August 31, 2011	91
Love Games	October 29, 2014	93
Metal Monster	December 16, 2015	125
Iron Soul	November 28, 2018	107
地獄の暴走列車	April 12, 2023	47

=== Singles ===
Title	Release date	Peak Chart Position in Japan
"Hanabi-la Daikaiten"	April 22, 1998; May 23, 2001 (reissue)	50
"Burn: Burn Your Fire of Love"	September 18, 1998; May 23, 2001 (reissue)	55
"Tekken II"	February 3, 1999; May 23, 2001 (reissue)	38
"Mikan no Uta" (Orange Song)	April 21, 1999; May 23, 2001 (reissue)	25
"Onigunshow" (Hard-hearted sergeant)	October 20, 1999; September 26, 2003 (reissue)	14
"Aikoso Subete" (Love Is All of My Life)	May 24, 2000; September 26, 2003 (reissue)	16
"S.H.R: Sexy Hero Revolution"	January 24, 2001	16
"Tairyô" (Good Fishing!)	August 29, 2001	13
"Soko ni, Anata ga..." (There You Are...)	January 23, 2002	13
"Bousou Rock" (Reckless Rider)	May 16, 2002	16
"Yonaoshi Good Vibration" (Social Reform, Good Vibration)	August 7, 2002	16
"Demae-do Icchokusen" (Straight-Line Meal Delivery)	November 10, 2004	15
"Suspense Gekijou" (Suspense Theatre)	February 9, 2005	22
"Aijin 28" (Lover 28)	August 3, 2005	28
"Haihin Kaishuu" (Junk Salvaging) (download only)	August 22, 2007	―
"Doku Mamaushi" (Poisonous Viper) (download only)	September 26, 2007	―
"Jacky" (download only)	October 31, 2007	―
"Pride"	March 4, 2009	26
"37564" (Killing 'em All)	February 23, 2011	85
"Ame no Kawasaki"(Raining Kawasaki)	January 25, 2012	99
"Miren Fire!" (Lingering FIRE!)	July 2, 2014	106
Metal Keiri-man (Metal Accountant)	May 27, 2015	135
Shining Star	June 23, 2021	―
The Grave	October 30, 2021	―
燃えろ!!ジャパメタ	November 18, 2022	―

=== Other ===
Title	Release date
Hellthy Set M: a DVD+CD set, with the DVD containing the music video for "FamiResuBombaa", and the CD containing the song "Magnum fire"	April 21, 1999
Route320: a CD by Mitsuo Nakajima on which Sex Machineguns band member Anchang is a guest guitarist	June 1, 2002
Love for Nana: Only 1 Tribute: contributed "11. Black Crow / Sex Machineguns for Black Stones"	March 16, 2005
Music from and Inspired by the Game Heavy Metal Thunder: The Recordings: contributed "01. Heavy Metal Thunder feat．Michael Schenker", "06. Demae-do Itchokusen", and "10. Iruka Ni Notte"	September 7, 2005
Remix Best (remix dance compilation)	March 18, 2012

=== Solo works ===
Member	Title	Release date	Peak Chart Position in Japan
Anchang	Cobra Twist	2007	includes covers of Marianne (The Alfee) and Cherry (Spitz)
Anchang	The Maintenance: a 10 tracks album under the name "Sex Machinegun"	January 28, 2004	26
Anchang	Memphis: a follow-up to "The Maintenance"	February 21, 2007	98
Anchang	Open Your Heart! Tear!: created after the 3rd SMG disbanded in 2003, a single containing the opening and ending themes to the Kochira Katsushika-ku Kameari Kōen-mae Hashutsujo anime	December 3, 2003	25
Circuit V. Panther	Sexy Finger: a 6-song solo release in the form of a CD and a live VHS	September 26, 2003	―
Circuit V. Panther	Sexy Finger II: another 6-track solo work	September 15, 2004	―
Circuit V. Panther	Sexy Finger III: another 6 track solo work	2010	―
Circuit V. Panther	Sexy Finger IV: another 6 track solo work	2011	―
Elleguns	Keepout: a 6-track instrumental by Circuit V. Panther, Samurai W. Kenjilaw, and Speed Star Sypan Joe	October 12, 2005	―

=== Videography ===
The naming scheme for the Sex Machineguns videos is as follows:

- Video Sex = A compilation of the latest music videos from the band
- SM Show = A compilation of concert video bits (SM Show 2 has a 90min full concert followed by a 20min clip of another, followed by some other clips, and then a second full 90min concert, for example)

Title	Release date	Format	
Emergency! Nozarashi!	September 27, 2000	Video	
SM Show	October 16, 2000	DVD and Video	
Video Sex	June 7, 2000	Video	
Video Sex	February 20, 2002	DVD	
SM Show 2	February 20, 2002	DVD and Video	
Video Sex 2	December 4, 2002	DVD and Video	
SM Show 3	February 19, 2003	DVD and Video	
SM Show Finale	October 22, 2003	DVD	
Metal Box	December 10, 2003	DVD	DVD
Made in USA	January 25, 2006	Single DVD	
Living in America	March 8, 2006	Documentary DVD	
A Day in the Live: Sex Machineguns Live in USA	June 28, 2006	Live DVD	
Video Sex Special Best Clips	March 26, 2008	DVD	
Independence Day Live	April 28, 2010	Live DVD	
SMG ALive!	May 18, 2011	Live DVD	
"Sex Machineguns vs. The Kanmuri" SMG Tour 2012	July 18, 2012	Live DVD	
