= Yoshikazu Yahiro =

Japanese musician

Yoshikazu Yahiro (born July 5, 1970 in Tsu, Mie, Japan), better known by his stage name Panther and formerly as Circuit V. Panther, is a Japanese metal guitarist. His stage name was comes from the place he was born, Mie Prefecture where the Suzuka racing circuit is, his favorite guitarist, Steve Vai from which he adopted the letter V, and the panther.

He joined Sex Machineguns in April 2001 as a tour supporter and became an official member in September 2001. When Sex Machineguns went on hiatus in 2004 most of the members, including Panther, formed Elleguns.

On September 26, 2003, he released a six track instrumental solo album, named Sexy Finger. On September 15, 2004, Sexy Finger II, another six track instrumental solo album, was released. Sexy Finger III, once again a six track instrumental solo album, was released on April 13, 2011.

Panther's style encompasses a wide variety of musical genres, including blues, hard rock, and different genres of metal; speed, power, neo-classical. He demonstrates the qualities of a guitar virtuoso; fluid sweep-picking, tapping, etc. He has also been featured in Young Guitar magazine.

Panther uses ESP guitars, of which he has his own signature line of custom designed guitars.

He is currently in the band Cycle (or The Cycle) since December 2006, with other former Sex Machineguns members of the 4th stage; such as Samurai.W.Kenjilaw and Speed Star Sypan Joe.
