= Dolls Apartment =

Studio album by Doll$Boxx
- Released: 12 December 2012
- Recorded: 2012
- Studios: Strip Inc., Roland Corporation, Tokyo, Japan
- Genres: Progressive metal; hard rock; heavy metal; electropop
- Length: 42:53
- Labels: King Records (JPN); C&L Music (KOR)
- Producer: Shōichi Nishino

Doll$Boxx chronology
Dolls Apartment (2012)	high $pec (2017)

Dolls Apartment is the debut and currently only album by the Japanese band Doll$Boxx. It was released on 12 December 2012, and reached number 56 on the Oricon chart.

== Overview ==
After working with Light Bringer singer Fuki as a guest vocalist on their 2012 tour, the then-four members of the Japanese rock band Gacharic Spin were inspired to form Doll$Boxx with Fuki as vocalist. Having all musicians reduced live commitments with their respective bands in the second half of 2012, they had time to create something new; Gacharic Spin members created new music and Fuki wrote lyrics, altering their usual styles to suit the combination. Their debut album Dolls Apartment was released in December 2012 and contains a re-recorded version of Gacharic Spin single "Nudie Rhythm".

== Track listing ==
All credits adapted from the original release.

No.	Title	Lyrics	Music	Length
1.	"Loud Twin Stars"	Fuki	Gacharic Spin	4:15
2.	"Merrily High Go Round"	Fuki	Gacharic Spin	4:02
3.	"Take My Chance"	Fuki	Gacharic Spin	4:46
4.	"Monopoly"	Fuki	Gacharic Spin	4:11
5.	"Roleplaying Life"	Fuki	Gacharic Spin	4:09
6.	"Fragrance"	Fuki	Gacharic Spin	5:11
7.	"Karakuri Town"	Fuki	Gacharic Spin	4:05
8.	"Omocha no Hetai" (おもちゃの兵隊)	Fuki	Issei Ambo	3:10
9.	"Doll's Box"	Fuki	Gacharic Spin	5:50
10.	"Nudierhythm ($ Version)" (ヌーディリズム)	Gacharic Spin	Gacharic Spin	4:14
Total length:				42:53

== Personnel ==
Doll$Boxx

- Fuki – vocals
- F Chopper Koga (F チョッパー KOGA) – bass
- Hana (はな) – drums, vocals
- Tomo-zo – guitar, leader
- Oreo Reona (オレオレオナ) – keyboards, vocals

Additional musicians

- Takanori Tsunoda (角田崇徳) - song arrangements
- Issei Ambo (安保一生) - song arrangements

Production

- Shōichi Nishino (西野正一) - producer
- Hideaki Nojima (野島英明) - engineer
- Yoshihide Mikami (三上義英) - engineer, mixing
- Mitsuyasu Abe (阿部充泰) - mastering
- Jun Endo (遠藤潤) - general producer
- Michiko Kihara (木原美智子), Yoshio Takenaka (竹中善郎) - executive producers
