= Gacharic Spin discography =

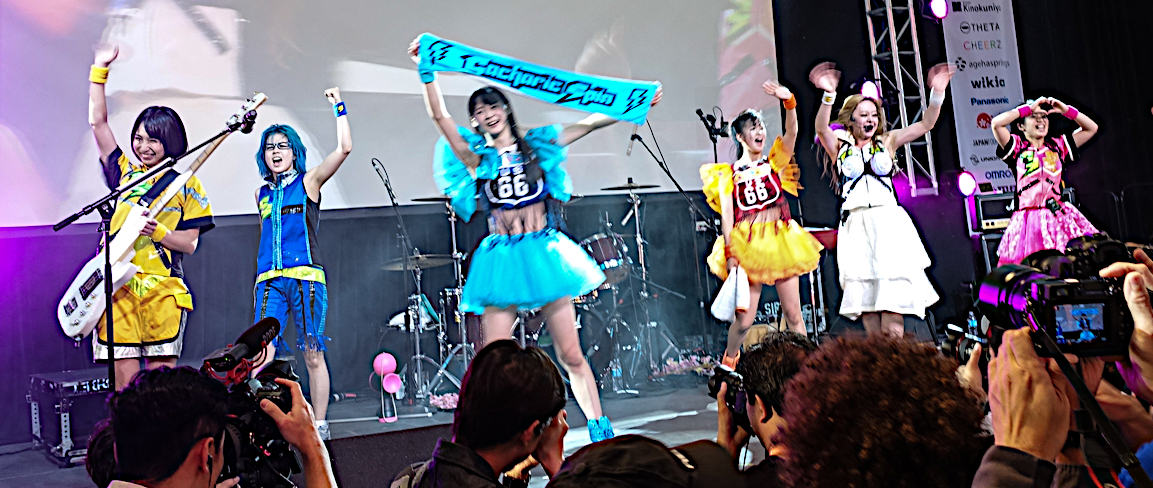
- Gacharic Spin at the 2015 J-Pop Summit
- Studio albums: 9
- EPs: 1
- Compilation albums: 2
- Singles: 14
- Video albums: 9
- Mini-albums: 2

Japanese rock band Gacharic Spin have released nine full-length and two mini studio albums, one studio EP, two compilation albums, nine video albums and fourteen singles.

== Studio albums ==
Title	Album details	Peak chart positions		
Title	Album details	JPN Oricon	JPN Billboard Hot	JPN Billboard Top
Delicious	Released: March 6, 2013; Label: Universal Music Japan; Formats: CD	78	—	74
Winner	Released: April 9, 2014; Label: Universal Music Japan; Formats: CD	40	—	36
Music Battler	Released: September 30, 2015; Label: Victor Entertainment; Formats: CD, CD+DVD	21	23	20
Certain Fluctuation: Kakuhen (確実変動 -KAKUHEN-, Kakujitsu hendō - KAKUHEN -)	Released: September 7, 2016; Label: Victor Entertainment; Formats: CD, CD+DVD	13	21	12
G-litter	Released: April 11, 2018; Label: Victor Entertainment; Formats: CD, CD+DVD	21	36	20
Gold Dash	Released: March 11, 2020; Label: Victor Entertainment; Formats: CD, CD+DVD	22	39	18
Gacharic Spin	Released: September 8, 2021; Label: Victor Entertainment; Formats: CD, CD+DVD	15	12	11
W	Released: July 5, 2023; Label: Nippon Crown; Formats: CD	20	16	17
Feast	Released: October 9, 2024; Label: Nippon Crown; Formats: CD	18	17	—
"—" denotes a recording that did not chart or that the chart did not exist.

== Mini albums ==
Title	Album details	Peak chart positions		
Title	Album details	JPNOricon	JPNBillboardHot	JPNBillboardTop
Virgin-A	Released: May 25, 2011; Label: Universal Music Japan; Formats: CD	172	—	—
Go Luck!	Released: November 21, 2018; Label: Victor Entertainment; Formats: CD	31	49	31
"—" denotes a recording that did not chart or that the chart did not exist.

== Extended plays (EPs) ==
Title	EP details	Peak chart positions		
Title	EP details	JPNOricon	JPNBillboardHot	JPNBillboardTop
Ace	Released: February 28, 2024; Label: Nippon Crown; Formats: CD	—	—	—
"—" denotes a recording that did not chart or that the chart did not exist.

== Singles ==
Title	Album details	Peak chart positions		
Title	Album details	JPNOricon	JPNHot100	JPNHotSingles
"Lock On!!"	Released: March 5, 2010; Label: Juicy Girls Records; Formats: CD	—	—	—
"Hunting Summer" (ハンティングサマー, Hantingusamā)	Released: June 2, 2010; Label: Juicy Girls Records; Formats: CD	—	—	—
"Crying Snow (Setsunaku) Melody" (雪泣く〜Setsunaku〜メロディー, Yuki naku 〜 Setsunaku 〜 merodī)	Released: September 8, 2010; Label: Juicy Girls Records; Formats: CD	—	—	—
"Nudie Rhythm" (ヌーディリズム, Nūdirizumu)	Released: June 27, 2012; Label: Universal Music Japan; Formats: CD	56	—	60
"My Only Cinderella" (僕だけのシンデレラ, Boku dake no Shinderera)	Released: March 19, 2014; Label: Universal Music Japan; Formats: CD	45	—	38
"Naked Liar/Melting Candy" (赤裸ライアー / 溶けないCANDY, Akahadaka raiā/tokenai kyandē) with Gacha Gacha Dancers	Released: February 25, 2015; Label: Victor Entertainment; Formats: CD, CD+DVD	32	82	26
"Don't Let Me Down"	Released: June 3, 2015; Label: Victor Entertainment; Formats: CD, CD+DVD	34	35	32
"Shakishaki shite!!/Arubusu no shōjo" (シャキシャキして!! / アルブスの少女)	Released: June 22, 2016; Label: Victor Entertainment; Formats: CD, CD+DVD	17	72	20
"Generation Gap" (ジェネレーションギャップ, Jenerēshongyappu)	Released: September 6, 2017; Label: Victor Entertainment; Formats: CD, CD+DVD	36	—	39
"MindSet"	Released: June 9, 2021; Label: Victor Entertainment; Formats: digital	—	—	—
"I wish I"	Released: August 25, 2021; Label: Victor Entertainment; Formats: digital	—	—	—
"Ticking mountain" (カチカチ山, Kachikachiyama)	Released: April 26, 2023; Label: Nippon Crown; Formats: digital	—	—	—
"Replica" (レプリカ, Repurika)	Released: June 7, 2023; Label: Nippon Crown; Formats: digital	—	—	—
"BakuBaku"	Released: November 8, 2023; Label: Nippon Crown; Formats: digital	—	—	—
"—" denotes a recording that did not chart.

== Compilation albums ==
Title	Album details	Peak chart positions		
Title	Album details	JPNOricon	JPNBillboardHot	JPNBillboardTop
Gachatto Best: 2010−2014 (ガチャっとBEST<2010−2014>, Gachatto besuto <2010−2014>)	Released: October 1, 2014; Label: Victor Entertainment; Formats: CD, CD+DVD	20	—	18
Gacha 10 Best (ガチャっ10Best, Gacha ~tsu10 Best)	Released: March 27, 2019; Label: Victor Entertainment; Formats: CD, CD+DVD, CD+BR	38	61	34
"—" denotes a recording that did not chart or that the chart did not exist.

== Video albums ==
Title	Video details	Peak chart positions	
Title	Video details	JPN DVD	JPN Blu-ray
Gacharic Spin Live & Lesson	Released: April 3, 2011; Label: Athos International; Formats: DVD	—	—
Gacharic Spin 1st Anniversary Live –Shogeki! Shogeki? Show Geki ~ Kanzenban (Gacharic Spin 1st Anniversary LIVE〜衝撃!笑撃?SHOW劇〜完全版)	Released: April 13, 2011; Label: Universal Music Japan; Formats: DVD	175	—
Delicious Live DVD	Released: October 23, 2013; Label: Juicy Girls Records; Formats: DVD	146	—
Delicious Tour DVD Limited Edition -Kanōnakagiri Tsumekomimashita- (Delicious Tour DVD 限定盤〜可能な限り詰め込みました〜)	Released: November 20, 2013; Label: Juicy Girls Records; Formats: DVD	32	—
Gachallenge Final!! 2014 -Odaiba Kesshou Sen- (ガチャレンジFINAL!! 2014〜お台場決勝戦〜)	Released: March 25, 2015; Label: Victor Entertainment; Formats: DVD/Blu-ray	95	82
Sekira Liar Tour Final -Shibuya Public Hall- (赤裸ライアーTOUR FINAL!!!〜渋谷公会堂〜)	Released: December 16, 2015; Label: Victor Entertainment; Formats: DVD	42	—
What! Seventh Anniversary!!!!!!! Tour Final (な・な・なんと7周年!!!!!!! TOUR FINAL)	Released: February 22, 2017; Label: Victor Entertainment; Formats: DVD	13	—
Tour Tomaranai 2018 Final – Yoiko (415) wa Mane Shinaidene (TOUR 止まらない 2018 FINAL ~良い子(415)は真似しないでネ~)	Released: August 29, 2018; Label: Victor Entertainment; Formats: DVD	14	—
Saikō saikyō densetsu – 10th Anniversary Special LIVE!!- (最高最強伝説 -10th Anniversary Special LIVE!!-)	Released: January 22, 2020; Label: Victor Entertainment; Formats: Blu-ray	—	23
"—" denotes a recording that did not chart.
