= Doll$Boxx =

Japanese band

Background information
- Origin: Tokyo, Japan
- Genres: Hard rock; power metal; electropop
- Years active: 2012-present
- Labels: King, Victor Entertainment, JPU Records (EU), Sliptrick (NA)
- Members: Fuki; Tomo-zo; F Chopper Koga; Oreo Reona; Hana
- Website: dollsboxx.site

Doll$Boxx (Japanese: ドールズボックス, Hepburn: Dōruzu Bokkusu), stylized as DOLL$BOXX, is a Japanese all-female hard rock band formed in 2012. It is the side-project of lead -vocalist Fuki (formerly of power metal band Light Bringer and Fuki Commune; currently with Unlucky Morpheus) and the musicians of the rock group Gacharic Spin.

== History ==
After Gacharic Spin's original vocalist Armmy left to take a hiatus because of medical reasons, bassist and bandleader F Chopper Koga decided not to cancel the planned tour dates, instead using an arrangement of supporting vocalists including future Gacharic Spin member Oreo Reona, and Light Bringer's vocalist Fuki. Due to Gacharic Spin and Light Bringer taking a break from live performances, they decided to form a new band, musically different from their current bands.

The group's first studio album, Dolls Apartment, was released on December 12, 2012, in Japan and January 29, 2013 in Korea. They released promotional videos for every song in the album (not including the cover song Nudierythm) on a weekly basis on their Niconico channel. On August 27, 2014 they released a DVD collection of their music videos, Doll's Collection.

After an almost three-year hiatus, they reunited on February 25, 2017 for a triple-bill show with Gacharic Spin and Fuki Commune, and again on June 24, 2017 for Gacharic Spin tour finale where they premiered a new song and announced a new mini-album, High $pec.

Another seven years later, the band reformed to play several concerts at various Zepp arenas near the end of 2024.

The band reformed in 2026. A new album Dolls Aether was announced in October 2026.

== Band members ==
- Fuki – lead vocals (2012–present)
- F Chopper Koga – bass (2012–present)
- Hana – drums, backing vocals (2012–present)
- Tomo-zo – guitars, leader (2012–present)
- Oreo Reona – keyboards, backing vocals (2012–present)

== Discography ==
=== Studio albums ===
Title	Album details	Peak positions	
Title	Album details	JPN Oricon	JPN Billboard Top
Dolls Apartment	Released: 12 December 2012; Label: King Records; Formats: CD, CD+DVD	56	54

=== Extended plays / mini-albums ===
Title	Album details	Peak positions		
Title	Album details	JPN Oricon	JPN Billboard Hot	JPN Billboard Top
High $pec	Released: 8 November 2017; Label: Victor Entertainment, JPU Records; Formats: CD, CD+DVD	21	26	17
Dolls Aether	Released: 3 March 2027; Label: King Records; Formats: CD, CD+Blu-ray	—	—	—

=== Video albums ===
Title	Album details	Peak positions
Title	Album details	JPN Oricon
Doll's Collection	Released: 27 August 2014; Label: King Records; Formats: DVD	30
Live Tour 2018 "high $pec High Return"	Released: 25 July 2018; Label: Victor Entertainment; Formats: DVD	11

== Music videos ==
Song	Year	Director(s)
"Loud Twin Stars"	2012	Naoki Takeyama
"Merrily High Go Round"	2012	Naoki Takeyama
"Take My Chance"	2012	Naoki Takeyama
"Roleplaying Life"	2012	Naoki Takeyama
"Monopoly"	2012	Naoki Takeyama
"Fragrance"	2013	Naoki Takeyama
"Karakuri Town"	2013	Naoki Takeyama
"Omocha no Heitai"	2013	Naoki Takeyama
"Doll's Box"	2013	Naoki Takeyama
"Shout Down"	2017	Unknown
"Dragonet"	2017	Unknown
"Sub-liminal"	2017	Unknown
"Sekaiwa Kitto Aiwo Shitterunda"	2017	Unknown
"Hero"	2017	Unknown
