= Trident (band) =

Japanese rock band

- Trident in 2024; From left to right: Serina, Asuka, Nagisa

Background information
- Origin: Osaka, Japan
- Genres: J-rock, girls band rock
- Years active: 2013–present
- Members: Serina (bass guitar, backing vocals); Asaka (guitar, lead vocals); Nagisa (drums)
- Past members: ろーら (Rōra) (guitar, 2013–2015); Junna (drums, 2013–2020)
- Website: trident-japan.com

Trident (stylised as TRiDENT; Japanese: トライデント) is a Japanese all-female rock band formed in Osaka in 2013. The band is noted for a contrast between their offstage personas and their live performance style, which they have described as: "three utterly fluffy girls who, the moment they step on stage, transform — delivering a powerful live show that sends lightning bolts through the hearts of those who watch."

The band initially performed under the name Girls Rock Band Kakumei (Japanese: ガールズロックバンド革命, lit. Girls Rock Band Revolution) from 2013, before rebranding as Trident on May 1, 2020, following a lineup change and a three-month hiatus. Since the rebrand, the band has released music independently, undertaken national tours, and secured television tie-ups, before announcing a major label debut via King Records released in November 2025.

== History ==
=== Formation and early years (2013–2019) ===
Trident was formed in 2013 by high school classmates Serina and Asaka, both members of their school's light music club (Japanese: 軽音楽部, keion-bu) in Osaka, under the name Girls Rock Band Kakumei. The lineup subsequently expanded when ろーら (Rōra) joined on guitar and Junna joined on drums, briefly making the group a four-piece.

Rōra departed in February 2015, returning the band to a three-member lineup. The group released their debut album Don't Stop in November 2017. Their 2018 single "High Speed Magnum" charted at number 112 on the Oricon weekly singles chart, followed by "Updraft" in April 2019, which charted at number 132.

Drummer Junna announced her departure in early 2020, formally leaving in March of that year. This prompted a three-month hiatus during which founding members Serina and Asaka reconsidered the band's direction.

=== Rebrand as Trident (2020) ===
On May 1, 2020, the band re-emerged under the name Trident and announced that support drummer Nagisa would join the group. Their first music video under the new name, for the digital single "Continue", was released on May 6, 2020.

Further digital singles followed throughout 2020: "To Be Continued..." (October 7), "Just Do It!!!" (November 16), and "We Are the World" (December 12). On December 15, 2020, Trident held their first headline show under the new name — Episode Ø: The Return of Us — at Zepp Haneda. Nagisa was formally elevated from support to full member status on the same date.

=== (2021–2023) ===
Trident released their first full-length album under the new name, Advance Generation, on March 17, 2021. The 12-track record charted at number 60 on the Oricon weekly album chart and was supported by a five-city tour across Japan. Gekirock magazine ran a feature interview with the band to coincide with the release. The album track "Imagination" was selected as the March 2021 ending theme for Buzz Rhythm 02 (Nippon TV).

In June 2021, the band released Saikōsō (再構創), a re-arrangement album of earlier Kakumei-era material. Trident undertook an active live schedule throughout 2021 and 2022, including the King of the Sea five-show series at Shibuya O-West, with guests including Gacharic Spin and 感覚ピエロ. In October 2022, the band released their debut mini-album D-X, supported by a one-man tour concluding at Ebisu Liquidroom in Tokyo.

In November 2023, Trident released the single "Dream Up", which reached number 49 on the Oricon singles chart. The accompanying Dream Up Tour concluded at Zepp Shinjuku on February 12, 2024. In September 2023, Trident appeared alongside Australian guitarist Orianthi at the Exclusive Two Nights in Tokyo event at Zepp DiverCity Tokyo.

=== Recent developments (2024–present) ===
In May 2024, Trident performed at Naon no Yaon (NAONのYAON) 2024 at Hibiya Open-Air Concert Hall in Tokyo, a festival for female musicians in Japanese rock produced by Show-Ya since 1987. That same month, they performed at Coming Kobe 2024 at Kobe's Meriken Park.

In October 2024, Trident performed at Phoenix Rising in Taipei in Taiwan alongside Japanese bands Bray Me and Make Make, marking the band's first international performance. The following month, the band released their second full-length album, Dux, in three editions including a special box set. An 11-date national tour, the Dux Tour 24–25, concluded at Shibuya O-East on January 24, 2025.

In August 2025, Trident announced at a solo show at Daikanyama Unit in Tokyo that they would make their major label debut via King Records in November 2025, with the release of the EP Blue Dawn.

== Members ==
=== Current members ===
Name	Role	Notes
Serina	Bass guitar, backing vocals	Co-founder
Asaka	Guitar, lead vocals	Co-founder
Nagisa	Drums	Joined as support member May 1, 2020; became full member December 15, 2020.

=== Former members ===
Name	Role	Period
ろーら (Rōra)	Guitar	2013 – February 2015
Junna	Drums	2013 – March 2020

== Discography ==
=== Albums ===
#	Release date	Title	Cat. no.	Oricon peak
As Girls Rock Band Kakumei
1	November 2017	Don't Stop	MSI-001	—
As Trident
1	March 17, 2021	Advance Generation	TRIDENT-02	#60
2	November 6, 2024	Dux	TRIDENT-19/20/21	—

=== Singles ===
#	Release date	Title	Oricon peak
As Girls Rock Band Kakumei
1	October 31, 2018	"High Speed Magnum"	#112
2	April 24, 2019	"Updraft"	#132
As Trident
1	October 26, 2022	"D-X"	—
2	November 15, 2023	"Dream Up"	#49
3	May 22, 2024	"Spice 'X'"	#43

=== Extended plays ===
#	Release date	Title	Tracks	Oricon peak
1	August 18, 2021	Under Ground	"Alive" / "Wake Up!!!" / "VS"	#59
2	December 15, 2021	Over Ground	"Distination" / "After Rain" / "Think of"	#64

=== Digital singles (Trident era) ===
#	Release date	Title
1	October 7, 2020	"To Be Continued..."
2	November 16, 2020	"Just Do It!!!"
3	December 12, 2020	"We Are the World"
4	February 2, 2024	"Bite the Bullet"

== Music videos ==
#	Date	Title	Director
1	May 6, 2020	"Continue"	—
2	September 4, 2020	"Just Fight"	—
3	December 7, 2020	"Brand New World"	Seidai Takekoshi
4	March 1, 2021	"Imagination"	—
5	August 2, 2021	"Alive"	Shun Murakami
6	December 3, 2021	"Distination"	Seidai Takekoshi
7	May 7, 2022	"Spoopy"	Seidai Takekoshi
8	September 23, 2022	"Cry Out"	Chie Maruoka
9	October 12, 2022	"Signal"	Kento Fujiwara
10	June 1, 2023	"Repaint"	Seidai Takekoshi
11	October 1, 2023	"Neo Future"	Takuya Oyama
12	October 23, 2023	"Kickass"	Takuya Oyama
13	February 2, 2024	"Bite the Bullet"	Lemon Shimada
14	June 6, 2024	"Spice!"	Seidai Takekoshi
15	November 6, 2024	"Haha!"	Takuya Oyama

== Concert tours ==
Year(s)	Tour title	Shows
Mar–Oct 2021	Advance Generation Release Tour	5 (Osaka, Niigata, Fukuoka, Nagoya, Tokyo Shibuya O-West)
Aug–Sep 2021	Under Ground Release Tour	6 nationwide
Dec 2021	Over Ground Release Tour	3 (Shibuya WWW X, Osaka, Nagoya)
Jun 2022	2nd Anniversary "Second City Tour 2022"	7 nationwide
Aug–Sep 2022	King of the Sea Five-Match Series	5 (all Shibuya O-West)
Nov–Dec 2022	D-X Release One-Man Tour	3 (Osaka, Nagoya, Tokyo Liquidroom)
Sep–Oct 2023	Hissho Zepp Kigan Tour	4 nationwide
Dec 2023–Feb 2024	Dream Up Tour	3, final at Zepp Shinjuku
Jun–Jul 2024	Spice Girls ni Goyōjin!? Tour	6 nationwide
Nov 2024–Jan 2025	Dux Tour 24–25	11, final at Shibuya O-East (January 24, 2025)

== Notable solo lives ==
Date	Title	Venue
December 15, 2020	1st One-Man: Episode Ø – The Return of Us	Zepp Haneda, Tokyo
June 28, 2021	1st Anniversary Live	Shibuya Club Quattro, Tokyo
May 1, 2022	2nd Anniversary Live (×2 shows)	Akabanebashi ReNY alpha, Tokyo
May 5, 2023	3rd Anniversary – All Songs One-Man	Akabanebashi ReNY alpha, Tokyo
February 12, 2024	Dream Up Tour Final	Zepp Shinjuku, Tokyo
May 2, 2024	4th Anniversary: Maxtora Tora 4	Shibuya WWW X, Tokyo
January 24, 2025	Dux Tour Final	Shibuya O-East, Tokyo

== Media tie-ups ==
Year	Song	Programme / usage
2021	"Imagination"	March 2021 ending theme, Buzz Rhythm 02 (Nippon TV)
2023	"Repaint"	July 2023 ending track, Break Out (TV Asahi nationwide broadcast)
2024	"Spice!"	October–November 2024 ending theme, World Pro Wrestling (TV Asahi)
