= Gacharic Spin =

Japanese rock band

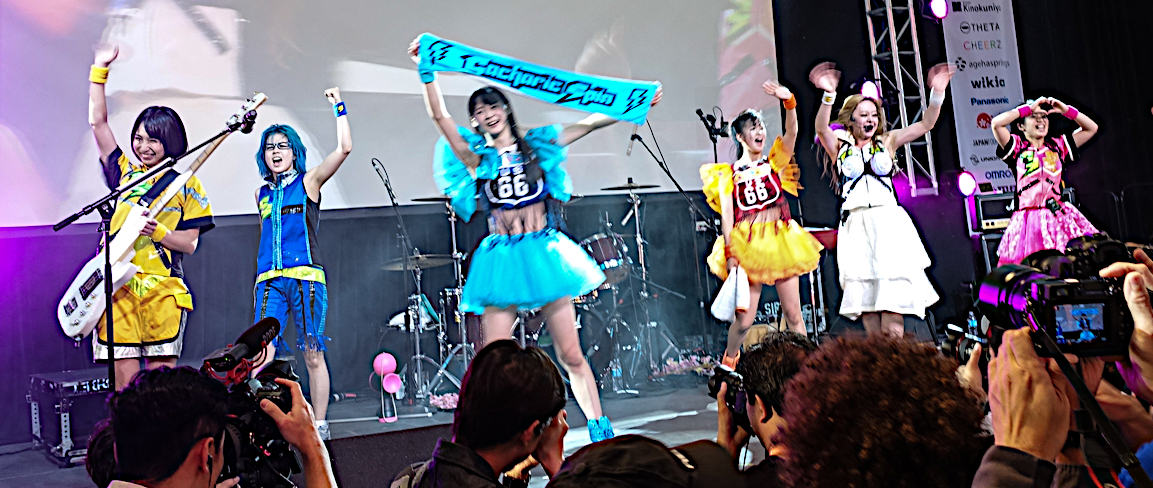
- Gacharic Spin at the 2015 J-Pop Summit

Background information
- Origin: Tokyo, Japan
- Genres: Electronic rock; hard rock; pop rock
- Years active: 2009–present
- Labels: Juicy Girls/Universal, Victor, Nippon Crown
- Members: F Chopper Koga; Hana; Tomo-zo; Oreo Reona; Angelina 1/3; Yuri
- Past members: Eita; Armmy; Arisa; Nenne; Mai
- Website: gacharicspin.com

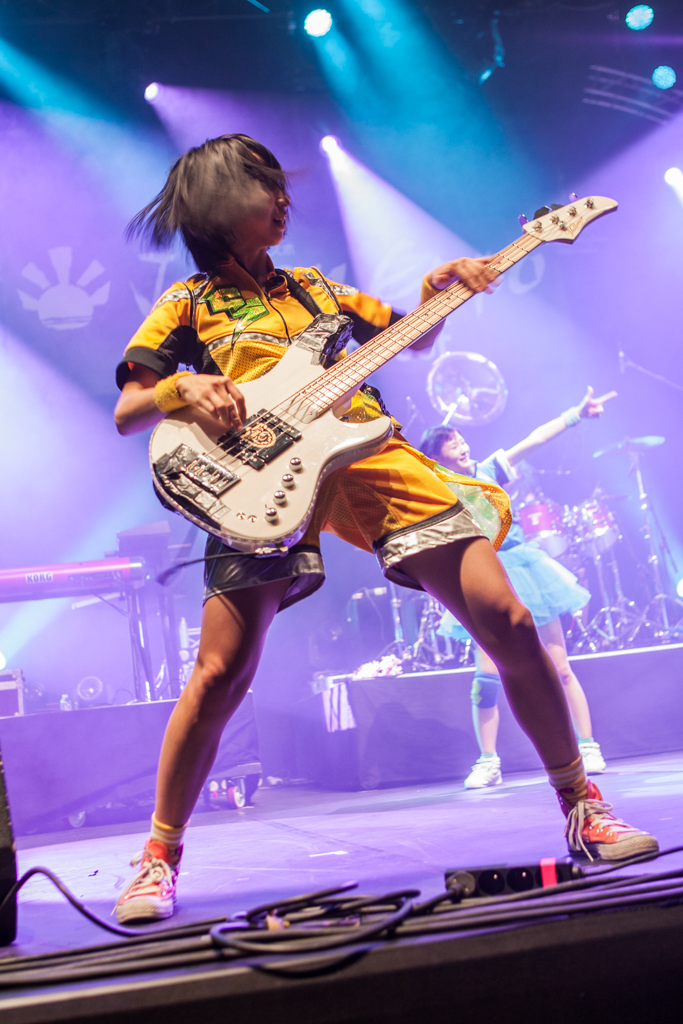
F Chopper Koga at Japan Expo 2014

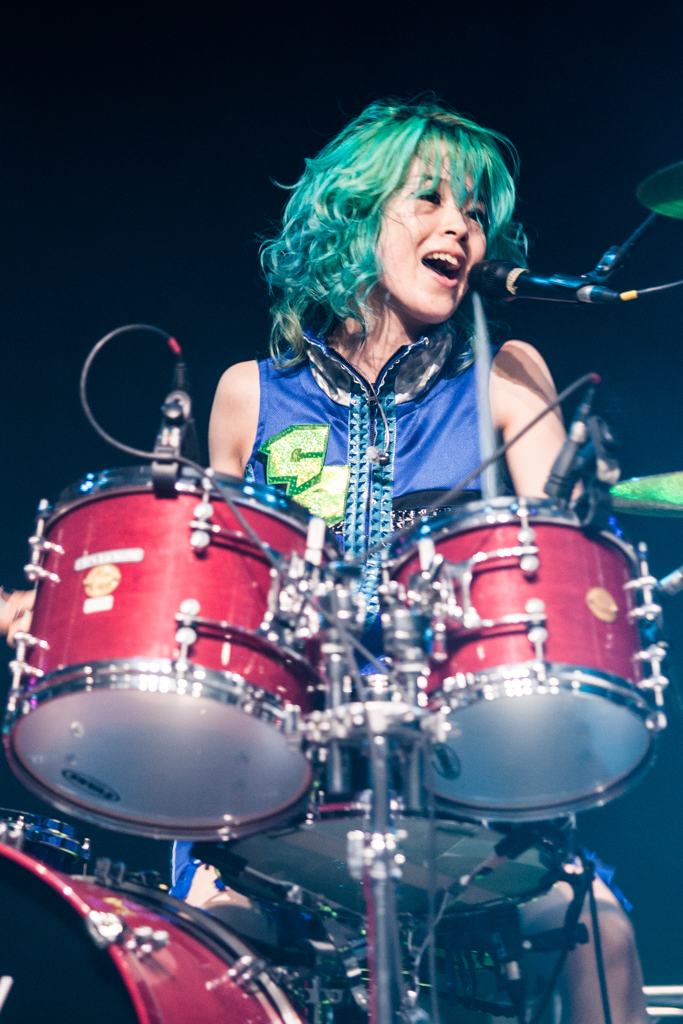
Hana at Japan Expo 2014

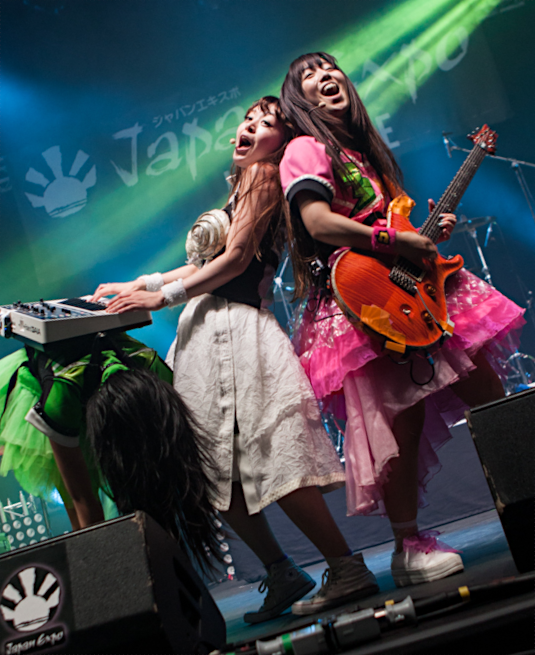
Oreo Reona playing a keyboard worn on Arisa's back, with Tomo-zo at Japan Expo 2014

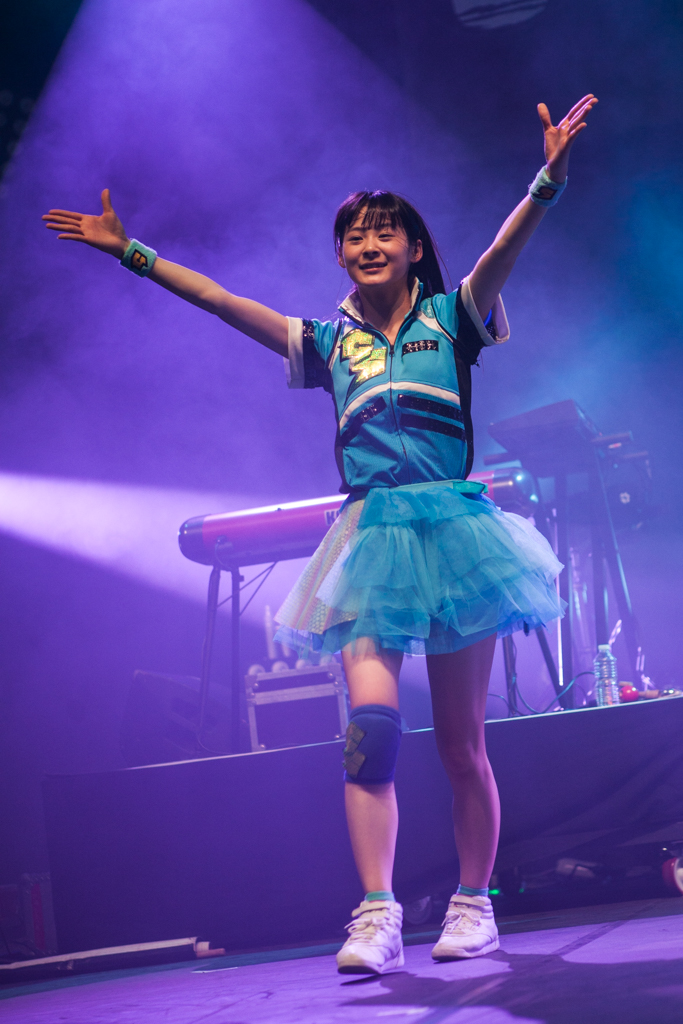
Mai at Japan Expo 2014

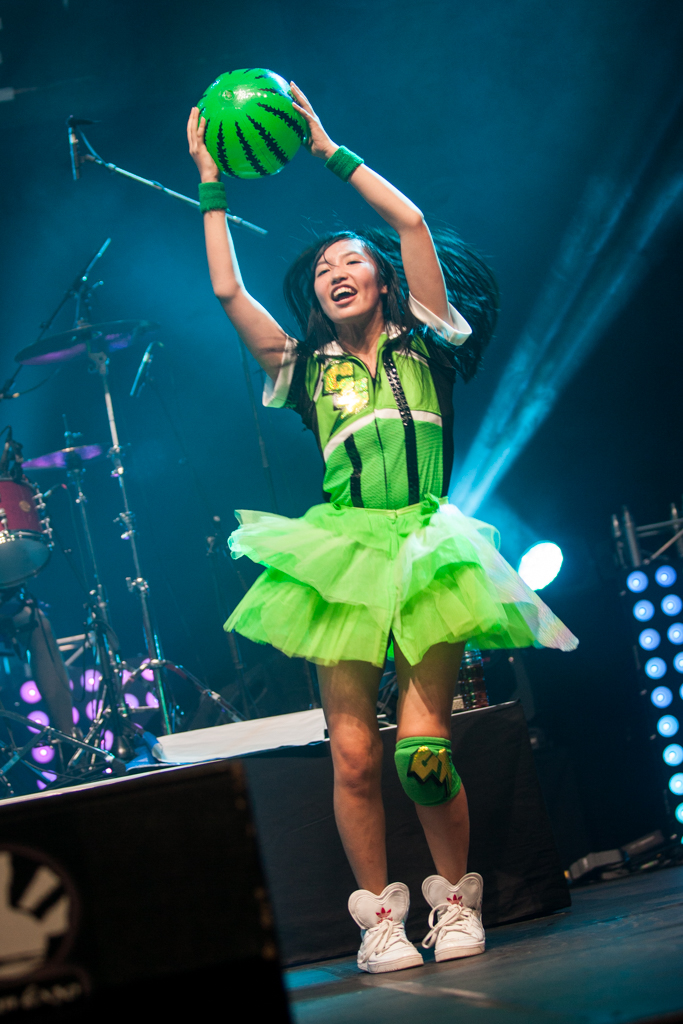
Arisa at Japan Expo 2014

Gacharic Spin is a Japanese rock band formed in Tokyo in 2009. Initially releasing music independently, they later signed with Victor Entertainment then Nippon Crown. Known for their flamboyant, aggressive performances, they have toured Japan extensively and performed internationally at conventions and festivals in USA, East Asia, and Europe.

The band has acted as motion capture models for the 2011 video game Hatsune Miku: Project DIVA Extend, coached the performers of Japanese idol girl group AKB48, had a song featured in anime series Dragon Ball Kai, promoted parasports with "warrior painter" Masayuki Kōjō, and collaborated with Takayoshi Ohmura.

The rock band Doll$Boxx was formed by Gacharic Spin and vocalist Fuki of Light Bringer after they worked together on tour in 2012, and Metallic Spin occasionally performs 80s heavy metal covers at their live shows.

== Career timeline ==
=== 2009–2011: formation and Virgin-A ===
Gacharic Spin was formed in Tokyo, March–April 2009, after bass player F Chopper Koga left her previous band the Pink Panda and, although considering quitting music, decided to form her own band with former high school classmate and drummer Hana.

The pair began recruiting more members; Koga contacted an acquaintance through their music scene, Eita, to play guitar and after a brief studio audition, she joined the band. Vocalist Armmy contacted Eita about learning guitar when her then-band went on hiatus, but the conversation turned to the creation of Gacharic Spin and Armmy was invited to audition for vocals. She thereafter joined, and the band derived its name from the word gacha (ガチャ), meaning clattering. Eita left the band November 28, 2009, after a concert in Ebisu, Shibuya, and was replaced by former Eu Phoria member Tomo-zo.

The band released their debut single "Lock On!!" on their own label Juicy Girls Records in March 2010, following up with "Hunting Summer" (ハンティングサマー, Hantingusamā) in June. They made their national television debut the following July on NHK General TV's Music Japan, performing "Lock On!!", and released the single "Crying Snow (Setsunaku) Melody" (雪泣く〜Setsunaku〜メロディー, Yuki naku 〜 Setsunaku 〜 merodī) later that year in September.

In March 2011, they were among acts performing at the Anime Matsuri convention in Houston, Texas, and shortly after released the mini-album Virgin-A in May. They also acted as motion capture models for the 2011 video game Hatsune Miku: Project DIVA Extend.

=== 2012–2013: Doll$Boxx and Delicious ===
In February 2012, members of the band coached the performers of AKB48 for their 2012 music video "Give Me Five!". Armmy left the band on March 14, 2012, for medical reasons and went on to form the band TakaEita with fellow early Gacharic Spin member Eita.

Quickly following the departure of Armmy; for a 2012 Japan tour, keyboardist Oreo Reona was added as a support member. She had previously been a member of Eu Phoria with Tomo-zo. Reona would shortly thereafter become a permanent member providing keyboards and vocals. It was during this tour that Fuki from Light Bringer joined Gacharic Spin along with Micki (of G∀lmet), Kana (of Head Speaker), Britney (Britney Hamada), Hitomi Togi, RisaRock (of Baby Spark) and Mayu (of BLiSTAR) as support vocalists. Although the band began to look for a new permanent vocalist, they had not found one with a French tour confirmed so, since Hana and Reona had previously been singers, they decided to share the job.

The single "Nudie Rhythm" (ヌーディリズム, Nūdirizumu) was released in June 2012.

During a period in 2012 with both Light Bringer and Gacharic Spin having reduced live commitments, and after working with Fuki as a guest vocalist on their own tour, they were inspired to form Doll$Boxx from the then-four members of Gacharic Spin with Fuki as vocalist. All members were interested to create something new, with Gacharic Spin writing the music and Fuki writing the lyrics, altering their styles to suit the combination. They decided to record a cover version of the Gacharic Spin single "Nudie Rhythm" and featured it on their debut album Dolls Apartment, released in December 2012.

With lead vocalists Hana also drumming and Reona playing keyboards – stationary instruments – keeping them from interacting with the audience, in 2013, "performers" Mai (Mai Ichigo) and Arisa were recruited to fill the role. Mai initially joined alone, with Arisa following shortly after. They came to be known as the "Gacha Gacha Dancers", with Mai also acting as choreographer.

==== Metallic Spin ====
They released their debut album Delicious in March 2013, with Nose, the drummer of Metallic Spin, featured on the album track "I love you, but..." (好きな人、だけど..., Sukinahito, dakedo...) providing a rap. Beeast Web Rock Magazine stated in March 2013 that Metallic Spin are "an overseas band that seems to have come from Northern Europe" (北欧からきたらしい海外バンド). In interview with Tomokazu Nishihiro for Real Sound in February 2015, Hana confirmed that "there was a band called Metallic Spin, which was very similar to Gacharic Spin, and was probably from Northern Europe" (Gacharic Spinによく似たMETALLIC SPINっていう、北欧のほうから来たであろうバンドが演奏していて), going on to clarify that "they look alike, but they are not us" (見た目は似てるんですけど、私たちではないという). Koga apparently laughed in response to this statement. In interview with Ruchesko and Silverfaye for JaME in August 2015, Mai stated that "members of Metallic Spin helped" her in the making of the music video for the single "Melting Candy" released in February 2015. Metallic Spin were later announced as guests of Gacharic Spin on their Gacha 10 Live 2019 Japan tour, and attendees of Anime Matsuri 2019, where Gacharic Spin performed, were reportedly seen cosplaying as Metallic Spin, by OKMusic, who referred to Metallic Spin as a "side program covering 80s heavy metal" (80年代ヘビーメタルをカバーするサイドプログラム). In interview with Todd Nelson for J-Generation in July 2019, Koga (translated by Cap Hayes) stated "Gacharic Spin and Metallic Spin are not related" when asked about a then-upcoming Metallic Spin live show.

=== 2014–2016: Winner, Music Battler and Certain Fluctuation: Kakuhen ===
The single "My Only Cinderella" (僕だけのシンデレラ, Boku dake no Shinderera) was released in March 2014, and the album Winner was released the following April. The band starred in the comedy-horror film Dead Banging, released May 2014.

Throughout 2014 the band appeared at multiple festivals and conventions in USA, East Asia, and Europe including:

- Tekko in Pittsburgh, Pennsylvania (April 4–6)
- Japan Expo, Paris, France (July 2–6)
- Sekigahara Live Wars: Rock onna Rock, Sekigahara, Gifu, Japan (July 20)
- Summer Sonic Festival, Makuhari Messe convention centre outside Tokyo (August 17)
- Inazuma Rock Festival, Shiga, Japan (September 13)
- Mega Rocks, Sendai, Japan (October 4)
- Countdown Japan "14/15", Makuhari Messe (December 30), also later appearing at the 2016/2017 event

In October 2014, they signed to major label Victor Entertainment releasing the compilation album Gachatto Best: 2010−2014 (ガチャっとBEST<2010−2014>, Gachatto besuto <2010−2014>).

The double A-side single "Naked Liar/Melting Candy" (赤裸ライアー / 溶けないCANDY, Sekira raiā/tokenai kyandē) was released in February 2015, with "Melting Candy" being the Gacha Gacha Dancers' (Mai and Arisa) debut single. This was followed in June by the single "Don't Let Me Down", which was used as the final ending theme song of anime series Dragon Ball Kai.

Performer Arisa left the band in July 2015 to focus on her studies entering her senior year of high school, and Mai's sixteen-year-old high school classmate and fan of the band, Nenne (Nenne Konishi), was recruited in her place. The following August, they performed at the J-Pop Summit in San Francisco, and the album Music Battler was released in September.

Founding vocalist Armmy died on October 15, 2015. No cause of death was disclosed.

The double A-side single "Shakishaki shite!!/Arubusu no shōjo" (シャキシャキして!! / アルブスの少女) released in June 2016, and the album Certain Fluctuation: Kakuhen (確実変動 -KAKUHEN-, Kakujitsu hendō - KAKUHEN -) was released the following September.

=== 2017–2019: G-litter and Go Luck! ===
The band returned to Anime Matsuri in April 2017 for their second appearance at the convention, and attended Anime Central in Rosemont, Illinois the following May. In August 2017, Nenne announced that she had to leave the band due to hearing damage and the chance she could lose her hearing if she continued to be exposed to loud noise like a concert. The single "Generation Gap" (ジェネレーションギャップ, Jenerēshongyappu) was released in September 2017, and the album G-litter was released in April 2018.

In September 2018, the band announced the release of mini-album Go Luck!, and revealed that Mai was to "graduate" from the band after six years. Go Luck! was released in November 2018 with six different versions, all presented in 12-inch cardboard sleeves, akin to those of LPs, and each limited to 9,999 copies in celebration of the band's 9th anniversary. The six variants feature five of each member – including Mai – in the accompanying artwork, and one of the complete group.

Celebrating their 10th anniversary, in February 2019, the band announced a greatest hits compilation album, Gacha 10 Best (ガチャっ10Best, Gacha ~tsu10 Best), to be released in March, with three editions: a single music CD "introductory" edition, a three music CD "intermediate" edition and an "advanced" edition with three music CDs and a Blu-ray of music videos.

Also in February, Angelina 1/3 joined as a "microphone performer". With a long-time desire to be a "singer", she was initially a little disappointed by the use of this descriptor, but she was convinced by her bandmates that she was free to express Gacharic Spin not only by singing. Koga invited her to audition after seeing her perform at a school festival; she was seventeen years old, still in school and had no professional stage experience when she joined. The following March, yuri – formerly of the disbanded Lagoon – joined as drummer. With Yuri drumming, Hana switched to guitar and continued as vocalist.

The band began the Gacha 10 Live 2019 Japan tour in April, and returned, for their third appearance, to Anime Matsuri in June.

With the Tokyo Paralympic Games due to commence August 2020; in October 2019, the band launched the "Para Plus Project" in collaboration with "warrior painter" Masayuki Kōjō, and support from Dai Nippon Printing, using their upcoming-album track "Adversity Hero" (逆境ヒーロー, Gyakkyō hīrō) in promotion. Kōjō had previously worked with Doll$Boxx to create the cover art for their 2017 mini-album High $pec, and provided artwork for a Gacharic Spin 10th anniversary live T-shirt design. For the project painting "para-badminton", a music video was produced featuring the band performing "Adversity Hero" with Kōjō painting behind them.

=== 2020–2022: Gold Dash and Gacharic Spin ===
In March 2020, the band released their sixth studio album, Gold Dash, containing music from guest songwriters Eijun Suganami of the rock band the Back Horn and Takayoshi Ohmura, a guitarist from Babymetal's Kami Band. Due to the COVID-19 Pandemic, the band was forced to cancel 2020 live shows and on July 3, 2020, the band performed their first virtual reality live show.

On February 11, 2021, drummer yuri announced her pregnancy and marriage. As a result, she suspended band activities until after childbirth. At the same time, Gacharic Spin announced that a live support member would be joining them; Levin (of La'cryma Christi) would feature as their support drummer on the Rocket Spirits restart tour.

The single "MindSet" was released in June 2021 with a digital format only and accompanying music video. As of April 2023, "MindSet" had accumulated over 250,000 listens on Spotify and the music video had over 1.2 million views on YouTube.

The eponymous and self-produced album Gacharic Spin was released in September 2021. Their fortyseven prefecture tour of Japan was halted due to COVID-19 restrictions and the band found themselves looking for creative outlets, turning to social networking services including their "Gachatto TV" YouTube channel. Their drive to play and write songs led to around half the songs on Gacharic Spin being completed during this period, with the band having made the decision to take control of production ahead of the decision to release the album. "MindSet" was selected to be released in advance of the album as the band agreed it best showcased the most recent incarnation of their band – with a prominent Angelina 1/3 – and because of the relative complexity of the music and lyrics.

=== 2023: move to Nippon Crown and W ===
In February 2023, the band moved labels to Nippon Crown. The band released the digital single "Ticking Mountain" (カチカチ山, Kachikachiyama) in April 2023 with an accompanying music video and announced their next album W (pronounced double) to be released in July 2023.

=== 2024: 15th anniversary Ace and Feast ===
In celebration of their 15th anniversary, the band released the EP Ace in February and their 11th studio album Feast in October of 2024.

== Musical style and performance ==
Writing of the band in 2015, after their appearance at J-Pop Summit, Nihongogo referred to Gacharic Spin as "one of the most aggressive and flamboyant all-female bands" of Japan, with an "electrifying ... tenacious stage presence and unique charm".

== Members ==
Current members

- F Chopper Koga – bass (2009–present)
- Hana – guitar, vocals, drums (2009–present)
- Tomo-zo – guitar, vocals (2009–present)
- Oreo Reona – keyboards, vocals, acoustic guitar (2012–present)
- Angelina 1/3 – vocals, performer (2019–present)
- Yuri – drums, percussion (2019–present)

Former members

- Eita – guitar (2009)
- Armmy – vocals (2009–2012, died October 15, 2015)
- Mai – performer, vocals, choreographer (2013–2018)
- Arisa – performer, vocals (2013–2015)
- Nenne – performer, vocals, keyboards (2015–2017)

Timeline

Touring musicians

- Fuki – vocals (2012)
- Micki – vocals (2012)
- Kana – vocals (2012)
- Britney – vocals (2012)
- Hitomi Togi – vocals (2012)
- RisaRock – vocals (2012)
- Mayu – vocals (2012)
- Tamu Murata – drums (2018)
- Levin – drums (2021)

== Discography ==
- Virgin-A (mini-album; 2011)
- Delicious (2013)
- Winner (2014)
- Music Battler (2015)
- Certain Fluctuation: Kakuhen (確実変動 -KAKUHEN-, Kakujitsu hendō - KAKUHEN -) (2016)
- G-litter (2018)
- Go Luck! (mini-album; 2018)
- Gold Dash (2020)
- Gacharic Spin (2021)
- W (2023)
- Feast (2024)
