= Mardelas =

Japanese heavy metal band

- Origin: Tokyo, Japan
- Genres: Heavy metal; power metal
- Years active: 2014–present
- Labels: King Records
- Members: Marina Hebiishi; Kikyo Oikawa; Hisayuki Motoishi
- Past members: Hibiki; Hideaki Yumida
- Website: mardelas.com

Mardelas is a Japanese heavy metal band, active since 2014. They have released 4 studio albums, 4 live albums, 2 video albums, 1 EP and 7 singles.

== History ==
Mardelas was started in 2014 as a solo project of Marina Hebiishi, ex-vocalist of Destrose. She was joined by members of Screaming Symphony and Light Bringer, and the band got a record deal with King Records.

The band's debut studio album, titled Mardelas I, was released on April 22, 2015. The album was ranked No. 49 on Oricon's albums chart. That same year, they released a single "Thousand Cranes". The second full-length album, Mardelas II, was released on June 15, 2016.

After a live show on May 6, 2017, bassist Hibiki left the band. He was later replaced by Hisayuki Motoishi. Mardelas III, released on May 22, 2019, is a concept album about a widow plotting revenge for her husband's assassination. In 2021, they released first live video album Mardelas Official Bootleg Vol.1 -Faith in Tomorrow-. The band's fourth album, Mardelas IV, was released on September 7, 2022. In 2023, they released a single "Snake to the Fire", the first to feature lyrics written entirely in English.

== Members ==
=== Current members ===
- Marina Hebiishi – vocals (2014–present)
- Kikyo Oikawa – guitars (2014–present)
- Hisayuki Motoishi – bass (2017–present)

=== Former members ===
- Hibiki – bass (2014–2017)
- Hideaki Yumida – drums (2015–2020)

== Discography ==
=== Studio albums ===
- Mardelas I (2015)
- Mardelas II (2016)
- Mardelas III (2018)
- Mardelas IV (2022)

=== EPs ===
- "Ground Zero" (2019)

=== Live albums ===
- Mardelas IV Tour 2022 in Nagoya (2023)
- Mardelas IV Tour 2023 Extra Vol.1 (2023)
- Mardelas IV Tour 2023 Extra Vol.2 (2023)
- Snake to the Fire Tour 2023 (2024)

=== Video albums ===
- Mardelas Official Bootleg Vol.1 -Faith in Tomorrow- (2021)
- Mardelas Official Bootleg Vol.2 -Mardelas IV Tour 2022 Tokyo Final- (2023)

=== Singles ===
- "Daybreak / Phantasia" (2014)
- "千羽鶴 -Thousand Cranes-" (2015)
- "Snake to Revive" (2016)
- "Omiyage CD" (2016)
- "Snake to Metamorphose" (2017)
- "Infinite Trinity" (2022)
- "Snake to the Fire" (2023)
