= The Legendary Axe II =

1990 video game

- Developers: Atlus, Red Company
- Publishers: JP: Victor Musical Industries; NA: NEC
- Producers: Harunobu Komori; Satoshi Honda
- Designer: Kyon Kyon
- Programmer: Mamoru Shiratani
- Artists: Boku Kubo; Hikari Mitomi; Jyurō Tsuji
- Composer: Hirotoshi Suzuki
- Series: The Legendary Axe
- Platform: TurboGrafx-16
- Release: JP: 7 September 1990; NA: October 1990
- Genre: Platform
- Mode: Single-player

The Legendary Axe II (Note: Also known as Dark Legend (Japanese: 暗黒伝説, Hepburn: Ankoku Densetsu) in Japan and simply as Legendary Axe II in the North American packaging.) is a horizontal platform video game released in 1990 by Victor Musical Industries and NEC. It is the follow-up to The Legendary Axe.

== Gameplay ==
Gameplay screenshot.

Gameplay is similar to the previous game, but the "strength charging" has been removed. Multiple, swappable weapons have been added, obtained by collecting those icons: sword, axe, and morning star. In addition, the player has a stock of screen-clearing bombs that can be used by pressing Run. Defeated enemies drop these weapons and bombs, as well as health refills and extensions, and so on.

Unlike the previous entry and its vibrant and colorful visuals and sound, II is dark and threatening in tone; combined with the changes to the weapon system, The Legendary Axe II is even more like Rastan.

== Plot ==
The king and queen of a royal kingdom die and their two sons have to fight for the throne. Prince Sirius loses to the evil Prince Zach. The tone is set for the good son, Prince Sirius, to reclaim the throne.

== Reception ==
Reception

Review scores
Publication	Score
Computer and Video Games	91%
Electronic Gaming Monthly	7 / 10
Famitsu	23 / 40
IGN	8 / 10
CVG Mean Machines	93%
Génération 4	92%
HonestGamers	3/5 stars
Joystick	87% 87%
PC Engine Fan	17.31 / 30
Player One	89%
Power Play	74%
Raze	68%
Tilt	15 / 20
TurboPlay	4 stars
VG&CE	8 / 10

The Legendary Axe II was met with mostly positive reception from critics. Electronic Gaming Monthly was an exception; the magazine's four reviewers all razed it for its near-complete lack of similarity to the original The Legendary Axe, and further said that even judged on its own terms it is a decent but unexceptional game. In contrast, Computer and Video Games called it "a great sequel, and a brilliant hack 'n slash in its own right." The reviewer applauded the atmospheric backdrops, ambient sounds, and strong difficulty curve. GamePro likewise felt it to be a satisfying sequel, concluding, "Remember, you axed for it!" in allusion to the heavy fan outcry for a Legendary Axe sequel. The reviewer particularly praised the graphics and variety of enemies.
