= The Legendary Axe =

1988 video game

- North American cover art
- Developer: Aicom
- Publishers: JP: Victor Musical Industries; NA: NEC
- Designers: Tokuhiro Takemori; Keisuke Abe
- Composers: Jun Chikuma; Toshiaki Takimoto
- Platform: TurboGrafx-16
- Release: JP: September 23, 1988; NA: August 29, 1989
- Genre: Platform
- Mode: Single-player

The Legendary Axe (魔境伝説 Makyō Densetsu in Japan) is a horizontal platform video game for the TurboGrafx-16. It was published by Victor Musical Industries in Japan and by NEC in North America. It was released in Japan on September 23, 1988 and in North America as a TurboGrafx-16 launch title on August 29, 1989. In the game, the player controls Gogan, a barbarian whose girl, Flare, was kidnapped by the cult of Jagu. The player must navigate through six platforming levels, armed with a legendary axe named "Sting" to defeat Jagu and his minions and rescue Flare. The game features a rechargeable "strength meter" that determines how much damage is dealt from the axe to enemies.

The Legendary Axe received high praise and accolades among video game reviewers, and it received positive preview coverage in anticipation with the TurboGrafx-16's launch, showcasing the new console's capabilities. Reviews from gaming magazines such as Electronic Gaming Monthly called it one of the best adventure games seen at the time. It was highly praised for its detailed graphics and animation, diverse music and gameplay, difficulty level, and execution. It won the "Best [TurboGrafx-16] Game of the Year" and "Video Game of the Year" (for all consoles) awards from Electronic Gaming Monthly and VideoGames & Computer Entertainment respectively for 1989. The game continued to receive praise from reviewers years after its release for its simple gameplay and game design that showed the performance and capabilities of the TurboGrafx-16.

== Plot ==
The Legendary Axe takes place in a faraway land, where its inhabitants have been under the control of the cult of Jagu. The cult, who has regularly pillaged the countryside, is led by a half-man half-beast named Jagu. The game's protagonist, Gogan, lives in the village of Minofu, who must hand over one person as a human sacrifice to the Jagu every year. Gogan was away in a remote village studying warfare when he finds out that his childhood friend, Flare, has been selected by the Jagu as their annual sacrifice. Rushing back to Minofu, he finds that she has already been taken by the Jagu to the "Evil Place" located in the mountains. The village elders hand Gogan the Legendary Axe named "Sting" which gives him great strength to fight the evil cult. Armed with this axe, he sets off to the Evil Place to defeat Jagu and his cult and rescue Flare.

== Gameplay ==
The Legendary Axe is a side-scrolling action/platform video game in which the player assumes the role of Gogan, who sets out through six differently-themed levels (called "zones") including jungles, caves, and mountains; the object is to defeat creatures such as "frog men", bears, and giant spiders with his Legendary Axe "Sting"; eliminate Jagu and his cult; and rescue Flare. Players must also navigate obstacles and hazards by jumping. Gogan has a life meter that decreases every time he sustains damage from creatures, and the player loses a life when Gogan's life meter runs out or if he falls off the screen. The game ends when players have lost all their lives, but they get four continues in which they can restart the game at the same section in which they have lost all their lives.

Gogan strikes a Nomad with his axe in the midst of a bird and a "Jagu idol" (containing a power-up) close by.

Gogan has a flashing "strength meter" on the top of the screen that determines how much damage he can inflict on enemies when he swings his axe. The strength meter empties after attacking and then slowly refills back to its maximum. The strength meter increases by 25% whenever the player collects a "crystal container". This incorporates an element of strategy in the game in which the player can either make a series of weak strikes with the axe or wait and build the strength meter for a single, more powerful strike. Scattered throughout the game to help Gogan are miniature statues called "Jagu idols" that reveal power-ups when destroyed; these power-ups include "crystal containers" that increase Gogan's attack strength, wings that increase the speed of Gogan's attacks, power balls that help replenish Gogan's life meter, crystals that award bonus points, and extra lives. Additional lives can also be obtained by earning certain numbers of points.

The zones in The Legendary Axe consist of different environments; they range from dark forests to caverns to mountain plateaus to fortresses. Players face many enemies along the way which they need to get through: "frog men" that leap from the water and spit fire; jumping and rolling amoeba-type creatures in the caverns; "rock men" that spring out and attack on the mountain plateaus; and giant spiders that shoot webs at players. The bosses in the game are guardians of Jagu's cult and are fought at the end of each zone. They include the following: at the end of Zone 1, a pair of possessed grizzly bears; of Zone 2, a magical boulder; of Zone 3, a group of flying slinky-type monsters called "Aqua Lungs"; and of Zone 4, a pair of creatures with shields and spears called "Punjabbis". Zone 5 culminates with a maze of rooms called the "Pits of Madness" which feature every enemy encountered up to that point plus some new enemies; at its end is a fire-throwing cult demon. Zone 6 consists of the final battle with Jagu himself.

== Development ==
The Legendary Axe was developed by Victor Musical Industries, and it was released under the title Makyō Densetsu in Japan for the PC Engine by the same company on September 23, 1988. Prior to its North American release, the game was retitled The Legendary Axe and was displayed with the other PC Engine games and the console itself at the 1989 International Winter Consumer Electronics Show in Las Vegas, Nevada. Later in 1989, NEC retooled Hudson Soft's console and renamed it the TurboGrafx-16 for its imminent North American release. NEC sought third-party support to develop the console; since they were purely a hardware developer, they lacked the ability to develop any software or games. This allowed NEC to publish games developed by those supporting third-party companies in North America. The Legendary Axe was released in North America as a launch title for the TurboGrafx-16 on August 29, 1989.

In 1990, Victor published The Legendary Axe II (Ankoku Densetsu, roughly translated as "Dark Legend"). Intended as a sequel to The Legendary Axe in Japan, the titular axe is not the main weapon, and the "strength meter" gameplay mechanic has been removed.

== Reception ==
Reception

Review scores
Publication	Score
Computer and Video Games	96%
Electronic Gaming Monthly	9/8/8/8
IGN	8/10

Awards
Publication	Award
Electronic Gaming Monthly	Best Game of the Year (TurboGrafx), 1989
VideoGames & Computer Entertainment	Video Game of the Year (all consoles), 1989

The Legendary Axe received positive coverage upon its release. In an overview of the PC Engine, VideoGames & Computer Entertainment referred to the game as "characteristic of the PC Engine's advanced sound, graphics and game play". A later preview from the same magazine said that it was one of the console's better games, and they applauded the arcade-like graphics and gameplay. They said that everyone who owned the console should own the game and that it was an "excellent showcase of the game system's capabilities". Electronic Gaming Monthly's Steve Harris said it was one of his favorite games, praising its theme, graphics, sound, and execution; he added that its features were unsurpassed by any video game at the time. Ed Semrad said it "is how [a platform game] should have been done" and that it should be the first game TurboGrafx-16 owners should buy. Donn Nauert called the game one of the best adventure games seen at the time and echoed Harris' praises. Jim Allee repeated Semrad's observation that the game is Rastan but with better graphics; he praised its detailed sprites, the diverse music and gameplay, and difficulty level and concluded that it "is everything you could want in a game".

The Legendary Axe received several awards and accolades. In Electronic Gaming Monthly's "Best and Worst of 1989", the game won "Best Game of the Year" honors for the TurboGrafx-16. The magazine cited a "perfect blend of action and adventure" and outstanding graphics and sound. It also received an award for "Coolest Boss Attackers" for its final boss Jagu – an award that was shared with 1989 Sega Genesis "Best Game of the Year" Ghouls 'n Ghosts for its final boss "Loki". The game won "Video Game of the Year" (for all consoles) honors from VideoGames & Computer Entertainment in 1989. They said that the game "has a little of everything: loads of axe-swinging action, layer upon layer of high-quality music and smooth, colorful animation. The combination of these elements brought this action adventure to the top of the video-game heap like rising cream."

The Legendary Axe continued to receive praise from reviewers years after its release. In 1997 Electronic Gaming Monthly editors ranked it number 80 on their "100 Best Games of All Time", attributing the game's popularity to its huge levels, "dead-on control", intelligently designed charge mechanic, and huge bosses, particularly the final boss. In his overview of the TurboGrafx-16's history, IGN's Levi Buchanan pointed out that the game made the console "an easy sell" for buyers and showed the superior performance of the TurboGrafx-16 over the Nintendo Entertainment System. He said that The Legendary Axe "made the NES look downright ancient". In a separate full review of the game, Buchanan noted that the game was an improvement over the console's pack-in game Keith Courage in Alpha Zones; he said that The Legendary Axe was more fun and had good action compared to the former. He noted that the game remained enjoyable almost 20 years after its release because of its simple platforming gameplay compared to more complicated modern video games like Mass Effect. He praised the game's smooth animation, innovative and detailed backgrounds, enemy designs, and soundtrack – saying that "any classic game tune nerd would enjoy having [the music] on their iPod". Allgame noted a change in the gameplay near the end of the game; after the fifth level, players must navigate a maze called the "Pits of Madness" which if they take the wrong path, they get sent back to its beginning.

The Legendary Axe was not released for the Wii's Virtual Console service, and IGN's Lucas Thomas rated the game as the 3rd best in a list of "Top 10 unreleased TurboGrafx Titles" for the system. He said that he was shocked to find that this game was not on the Virtual Console, given that it was one of the TurboGrafx-16's flagship titles that were heavily advertised when it was released. UK-based magazine Retro Gamer, in a look back to video gaming in January 1989, made a similar comparison of the game to Rastan, "with a lot of sword slashing and platform jumping". The reviewer said that the popularity of The Legendary Axe in Japan was what caused it to be released as a TurboGrafx-16 launch title in North America.
