= Light Bringer (band) =

Japanese heavy metal band

- Origin: Tokyo, Japan
- Genres: Power metal; synth-pop
- Years active: 2005–2014
- Label: King Records
- Past members: Hibiki; Mao; Fuki; Ryo; Hide; Satoru; Kazu; Seiya; JaY; Hideaki Yumida
- Website: lightbringer-lovely.com

Light Bringer was a Japanese power metal band active from 2005 to 2014. They have released 5 studio albums, 2 video albums, 2 EPs, 6 singles, 3 demos and 1 compilation.

== History ==
The band was founded in 2005 by bassist Hibiki in Tokyo. He was joined by vocalist Fuki, keyboardist Mao, guitarist Hide and drummer Ryo. The band's name is a reference to Lucifer. In 2006 and 2007 Light Bringer released three singles: "1st Demo", "Overture" and "Episode".

Light Bringer debuted with an EP titled "Heartful Message", released via Black-listed Productions. Guitarist Hide was replaced by Kazu. The band's first full-length record, Tales Of Almanac, was released in 2009. Their second album, titled Midnight Circus, was released in 2010. They were signed to King Records in 2011. That same year, Kazu left the band. Light Bringer's third album, Genesis, was released via King Records in 2012. It was ranked No. 28 at Oricon's albums chart.

Drummer Satoru and guitarist Seiya left the band. JaY and Hideaki Yumida joined in 2013. Their fourth album, titled Scenes of Infinity, released in 2013, was ranked No. 29 by Oricon, and their fifth, Monument, released in 2014, was ranked No. 26.

On December 21, 2014, Light Bringer went on an indefinite hiatus. Fuki continues to perform with Unlucky Morpheus and Doll$Boxx. Hibiki and Yumida both joined Mardelas. JaY left Light Bringer in 2018 to officially join Matenrou Opera, whom he had been supporting since 2016. Mao collaborates with Japanese speed metal band Lovebites.

== Members ==
=== Last line-up ===
- Hibiki – bass (2005–2014)
- Fuki – vocals (2005–2014)
- Mao – keyboards (2005–2014)
- JaY – guitars (2013–2014)
- Hideaki Yumida – drums (2013–2014)

=== Former members ===
- Ryo – drums (2005–2007)
- Hide – guitars (2005–2006)
- Satoru – drums (2007–2012)
- Kazu – guitars (2007–2011)
- Seiya – guitars (2008–2012)

== Discography ==
=== Studio albums ===
- Tales of Almanac (2009)
- Midnight Circus (2010)
- Genesis (2012)
- Scenes of Infinity (2013)
- Monument (2014)

=== EPs ===
- "Heartful Message" (2007)
- "Deux poupées" (2008)

=== Video albums ===
- Memory of Genesis (2012)
- The Light Brings the Past Scenes (2014)

=== Singles ===
- "Hearn's Heaven" (2008)
- "Diamond" (2010)
- "Upstream Children" (2010)
- "Burned 07" (2011)
- "Noah" (2011)
- "Icarus" (2014)

=== Demos ===
- "1st Demo" (2006)
- "Overture" (2006)
- "Episode" (2007)

=== Compilations ===
- Deux Poupées (Extra Edition) (2008)
