= Victor Entertainment =

Japanese entertainment company

Victor Entertainment, Inc.
- His Master's Voice logo used by Victor Entertainment

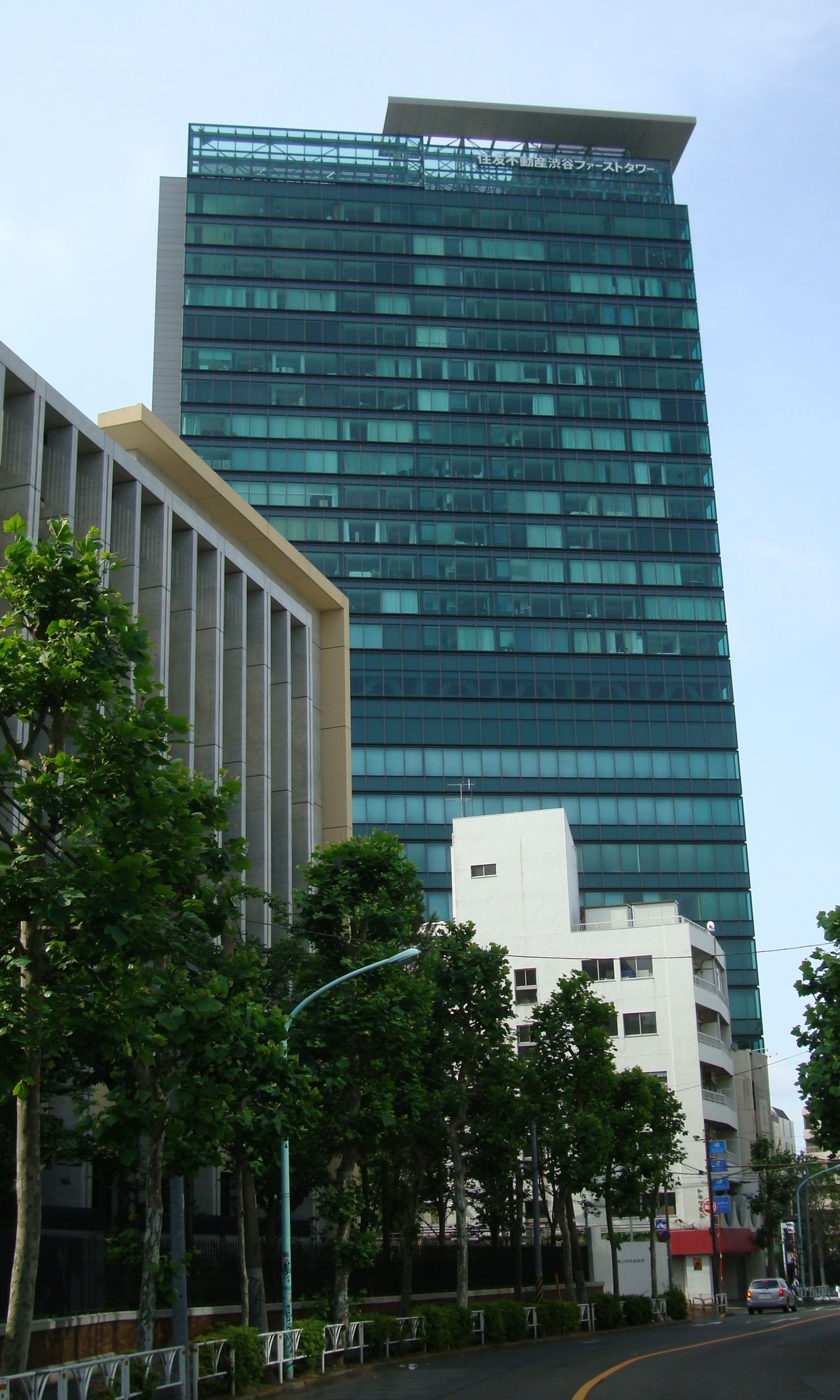
- Native name: ビクターエンタテインメント株式会社
- Romanized name: Bikutā Entateinmento kabushiki-gaisha
- Formerly: Victor Musical Industries, Inc. (1972–1993); Victor Entertainment, Inc. (1993–2014); JVCKenwood Victor Entertainment, Inc. (2014–2024)
- Type: Subsidiary
- Industry: Entertainment
- Founded: April 25, 1972; 54 years ago Yokohama, Japan
- Headquarters: Higashi, Shibuya, Tokyo, Japan
- Key people: Yuichi Kaito (president); Toshiaki Shibutani (managing director)
- Products: Audio, visual and computer software media products
- Number of employees: 400 (as of July 2017)
- Parent: JVCKenwood
- Website: www.jvcmusic.co.jp

Victor Entertainment, Inc. (Japanese: ビクターエンタテインメント株式会社, Hepburn: Bikutā Entateinmento kabushiki-gaisha) is a subsidiary of JVCKenwood that produces and distributes music, movies and other entertainment products such as anime and television shows in Japan. It is known as JVC Entertainment in countries where Sony Music Entertainment operates the RCA Victor label.

== History ==
- April 1972: Victor Musical Industries, Inc. (ビクター音楽産業株式会社, Bikutā Ongaku Sangyō Kabushiki-gaisha) is spun off as a subsidiary of JVC.
- September 30, 1982: JVC Musical Industries, Inc. is founded in the U.S.
- February 1984: The sales and marketing department of JVC is spun off as Nihon AVC, Inc. (日本エイ・ブイ・シー株式会社, Nihon EiBuiShī Kabushiki-gaisha).
- January 1990: JVC Musical Industries announces its first video game release will be Boulder Dash.
- October 30, 1991: JVC Musical Industries Europe, Ltd. is founded.
- April 1993: Nihon AVC and Victor Musical Industries merge and the name is changed to Victor Entertainment, Inc. (ビクターエンタテインメント株式会社, Bikutā Entateinmento Kabushiki-gaisha).
- October 1, 1996: Victor Interactive Software takes over video game-related activities after Pack-In-Video is merged with Victor Entertainment.
- May 1, 1997: JVC Musical Industries is renamed to JVC Music, Inc.
- May 14, 1997: JVC Musical Industries Europe is renamed to JVC Music Europe, Ltd.
- February 24, 1999: JVC Music, Inc. is dissolved
- March 1999: Victor Entertainment's main office is moved.
- March 31, 2003: Victor Interactive Software is acquired by Marvelous Entertainment and becomes Marvelous Interactive.
- May 8, 2006: JVC Music Europe is dissolved.
- April 2014: Victor Entertainment's corporate name is changed to JVCKenwood Victor Entertainment Corporation.
- April 2024: JVCKenwood Victor Entertainment changed its corporate name back to Victor Entertainment, Inc.

== Labels ==
=== Records ===
- AB-Victor France
- Aosis Records
- CJ Victor Entertainment (joint venture with CJ E&M of South Korea)
- Colourful Records
  - ELA Music (Kaela Kimura's label)
  - her (SCANDAL's label)
- Cypress Showers
- Getting Better
- Globe Roots
- Happy House
- Hihirecords (for babies and kids)
- Invitation
- JVC Entertainment (production, artist managements, and overseas products)
  - Flying Dog (animation-related products)
- FlyingStar Records (formerly BabeStar Label)
  - rookiestar
- JVC Jazz
- JVC World Sounds
- Mob Squad (Dragon Ash Private Label)
- Nafin
- Speedstar International
- Speedstar Records
- Taishita (Southern All Stars Private Label, joint venture with Amuse, Inc.)
- Victor
- Zen (Japanese sub-label of Victor)

=== Distribution ===
- 3CG Records
- AI Entertainment (a division of Mnet Media's FNC Music, co-distributed with Warner Music Japan)
- Bad News
- D-topia Entertainment
- Daipro-X
- Marquee, Inc.
- Revolver Music
- Substance
- Teichiku Entertainment (Subsidiary of Victor Entertainment until 2015.)
  - BAIDIS
  - Be-tam-ing
  - Continental
  - Imperial Records
  - Imperial International
  - KIDSDOM (Animation Related Label)
  - MONAD (Haruomi Hosono Private Label)
  - Non-Standard (Haruomi Hosono Produce Label)
  - Overseas Records
  - PROGRAM (Katsumi Tanaka Private Label ~2000)
  - TOHO Records (Master Rights Only)
  - Takumi Note
  - Teichiku Records
  - TMC Music
    - 246 Records
  - Union Records
    - Union Black Records
- WHD Entertainment Inc. (joint venture between WOWOW, Horipro and Disk Garage)

=== Video ===
- Nelvana
- GAGA Communications
- MediaNet Pictures
- SPO Entertainment
- TBS Video

== Major artists ==
Listed alphabetically by group or first name. Names are in Western order (given name, family name).

- Atarashii Gakko! (Also under 88rising)
- 9nine (2009–2010)
- Alexandra Stan
- Akino Arai (flying DOG)
- AKINO from bless4 (flying DOG)
- Anthem
- Alesha Dixon
- ALI PROJECT (flying DOG)
- Amorphis
- Angra
- AZKi (July 2023 - June 2025) - returned to Hololive Production
- Batten Showjo Tai (Colourful Records)
- The Back Horn
- The Bawdies (Victor/Getting Better)
- Billlie (Japan only)
- Blessed By A Broken Heart
- Buck-Tick (1987–1996; 2016–present under its vanity label Lingua Sounda)
- Chanmina (2016–2017) (Warner Music Japan 2018–present)
- Chiaki Ishikawa (flying DOG)
- CNBLUE (AI Ent./Victor) – left Victor for Warner
- Cocco
- Cravity (Japan only)
- Cross Vein
- Cymbals
- D (CJ Victor)
- Daigo☆Stardust
- Death from Above 1979 (Japanese distribution rights)
- Dew
- Doll$Boxx
- Dragon Ash (Mob Squad/Victor)
- FictionJunction (flying DOG)
  - FictionJunction YUUKA (flying DOG)
- Fear, and Loathing in Las Vegas
- Fuki Commune
- Gacharic Spin
- Gari
- Going Under Ground
- Guniw Tools
- Hanson (Japan only)
- Maia Hirasawa (Japan only)
- Leo Ieiri (Colourful Records)
- Impellitteri
- IVVY
- Hiromi Iwasaki
- Jero
- Junko Sakurada
- Kaela Kimura (2013–present)
- Kigurumi
  - Kei (joined "Kigurumi" on November 7, 2007.)
  - Miki (joined "Kigurumi" on November 7, 2007.)
  - Rena
- Kelly Sweet
- Kigurumichiko
  - Rena (Kigurumi)
  - Michiko Shimizu
- Kiko Loureiro
- Kiroro
- Kitaro
- Kokia
- Kyōko Koizumi
- Kyūso Nekokami
- Leah Dizon
- Lisa Komine (flying DOG)
- Liv Moon
- Lovebites
- Love Psychedelico
- Lovely Summer Chan
- Lunkhead
- Maaya Sakamoto (flying DOG)
- Mamamoo (Japan only)
- Mariko Takahashi
- Masumi
- Matt Bianco
- May'n (flying DOG)
- Megumi Nakajima (flying DOG)
- Merry
- Miho Hatori
- Mika Arisaka
- Miki Matsubara (1987–1989)
- Minmi
- Miz
- Nano (flying DOG)
- never young beach
- Noriko Sakai (1987–2009)
- Nujabes
- Orange Range (2012–, Spice Records/Super Echo Label/Speedstar Records)
- ONF (Japan only)
- Paris Match
- PIG
- Pink Lady
- Plastic Tree (CJ Victor)
- Purple Kiss (Japan only)
- Quruli
- Remioromen
- Reol
- Rimi Natsukawa
- ROMEO (Park Jung Min | SS501)
- ROUND TABLE featuring Nino (flying DOG)
- Rurika Yokoyama (CJ Victor)
- Sakanaction
- savage genius (flying DOG)
- Sayuri Yoshinaga
- Scandal (her)
- See-Saw (flying DOG)
- Sung Si-kyung
- Shinichi Mori
- Shunsuke Kiyokiba (former EXILE vocalist that was signed under Avex)
- SikTh – Japan only
- Silent Descent
- SMAP
  - Masahiro Nakai
  - Kimura Takuya
  - Goro Inagaki (also goes by &G)
  - Tsuyoshi Kusanagi
  - Shingo Katori
- Southern All Stars
- Steve Barakatt
- Supergroupies
- Sweet Vacation
  - Yuko Hara (solo and duet releases with SMAP member Shingo Katori)
  - Keisuke Kuwata/Kuwata Band
  - Hiroshi Matsuda
  - Kazuyuki Sekiguchi
- Tokino Sora
- Toy-Box
- Traffic Light. (MeseMoa.'s sub-group)
- UA
- Yena
- VIXX (CJ Victor)
- Wonho (Japan only)
- Yoko Kanno (flying DOG)
- Yuki Kajiura (flying DOG)
- Yukio Hashi
- Zardonic
- Sambomaster

== Video games ==
Victor Music/Ent.

Title	Platform(s)	Release date
Banana	Famicom	September 8, 1986
Hana no Star Kaidou	Famicom	March 17, 1987
Outlanders	Famicom	December 4, 1987
Fisherman Sanpei	Famicom	March 17, 1988
Ys	Famicom	August 26, 1988
Makyou Densetsu	PC Engine	September 23, 1988
Kaguya Hime Densetsu	Famicom	December 16, 1988
Shiryou Sensen: War of the Dead	PC Engine	March 24, 1989
Kagami no Kuni no Legend	CD-ROM²	October 27, 1989
Jack Nicklaus' Greatest 18 Holes of Major Championship Golf	PC Engine	November 24, 1989
Jack Nicklaus' Greatest 18 Holes of Major Championship Golf	CD-ROM²	September 14, 1990
Tiger Road	PC Engine	February 23, 1990
Flappy Special	Game Boy	March 23, 1990
Sansara Naga	Famicom	March 23, 1990
King of Casino	PC Engine	March 30, 1990
Ys II	Famicom	May 25, 1990
Ultrabox Soukangou	CD-ROM²	June 15, 1990
Veigues Tactical Gladiator	PC Engine	June 29, 1990
Magical Dinosaur Tour	CD-ROM²	August 24, 1990
Jangou	Famicom	August 30, 1990
Ankoku Densetsu	PC Engine	September 7, 1990
Boulder Dash	Game Boy	September 21, 1990
Ultrabox 2-gou	CD-ROM²	September 28, 1990
Toy Shop Boys	PC Engine	December 14, 1990
Ultrabox 3-gou	CD-ROM²	December 26, 1990
Niji no Silkroad	Famicom	February 22, 1991
Ys III	Famicom	September 27, 1991
Nontan to Issho: KuruKuru Puzzle	Super Famicom, Game Boy	1994
Tournament Leader	Sega Saturn	August 23, 1996
Tournament Leader	PlayStation	August 23, 1996

Victor/JVC Music

Title	Platform(s)	Release date
Boulder Dash	NES	June 1990
Choplifter II	Game Boy	June 21, 1991
Star Wars	NES	November 1991
Dungeon Master	Super NES	December 20, 1991
Star Wars: The Empire Strikes Back	NES	March 1992
Defenders of Dynatron City	NES	July 1992
Wonder Dog	Sega CD	September 25, 1992
Super Star Wars	Super NES	November 1992
Wolfchild	Sega CD	December 1992
Wolfchild	Sega Genesis	March 1993
AH-3 Thunderstrike	Sega CD	January 1993
The Secret of Monkey Island	Sega CD	February 1993
Keio Flying Squadron	Sega CD	August 6, 1993
Super Star Wars: The Empire Strikes Back	Super NES	October 1993
Samurai Shodown	Sega CD	1993
Jaguar XJ220	Sega CD	1993
Syvalion	Super NES	1993
Heimdall	Sega CD	March 18, 1994
Dungeon Master II: The Legend of Skullkeep	Sega CD	March 25, 1994
Star Wars: Rebel Assault	Sega CD	March 1994
Magic Boy	Super NES	September 1994
Super Star Wars: Return of the Jedi	Super NES	October 1994
Indiana Jones' Greatest Adventures	Super NES	October 1994
Ghoul Patrol	Super NES	November 1994
Time Cop	Super NES	February 17, 1995
Fatal Fury Special	Sega CD	March 31, 1995
Big Sky Trooper	Super NES	September 1995
King of Boxing	Sega Saturn	October 20, 1995
Emmitt Smith Football	Super NES	November 1995
SeaBass Fishing	Sega Saturn	February 23, 1996
Keio Flying Squadron 2	Sega Saturn	May 17, 1996
Impact Racing	Sega Saturn	July 5, 1996
Impact Racing	PlayStation	July 5, 1996
Highway 2000	Sega Saturn	September 1996
Hyper Tennis: Final Match	PlayStation	November 1996
Victory Boxing Champion Edition	PlayStation	December 1996
Pinball Graffiti	Sega Saturn	September 1996
Wing Over	PlayStation	1997

JVC Music Europe

Title	Platform(s)	Release date
Tetris Plus	PlayStation	October 1997
Yusha: Heaven's Gate	PlayStation	October 1997
Peak Performance	PlayStation	November 1997
BRAHMA Force: The Assault on Beltlogger 9	PlayStation	March 1998
Indy 500	PlayStation	April 1998
No One Can Stop Mr. Domino!	PlayStation	September 1998
Victory Boxing 2	PlayStation	October 1998
Pop'n Pop	PlayStation	1998
Pop'n Pop	Game Boy Color	2001
Psychic Force 2	PlayStation	September 19, 2000
Vampire Hunter D	PlayStation	2000
RayCrisis	PlayStation	2000
Panzer Front	PlayStation	April 17, 2001

== See also ==
- Subsidiaries of JVC Kenwood
- EF Johnson Technologies – Multi-band portable radio company
