= F Chopper Koga =

Japanese musician

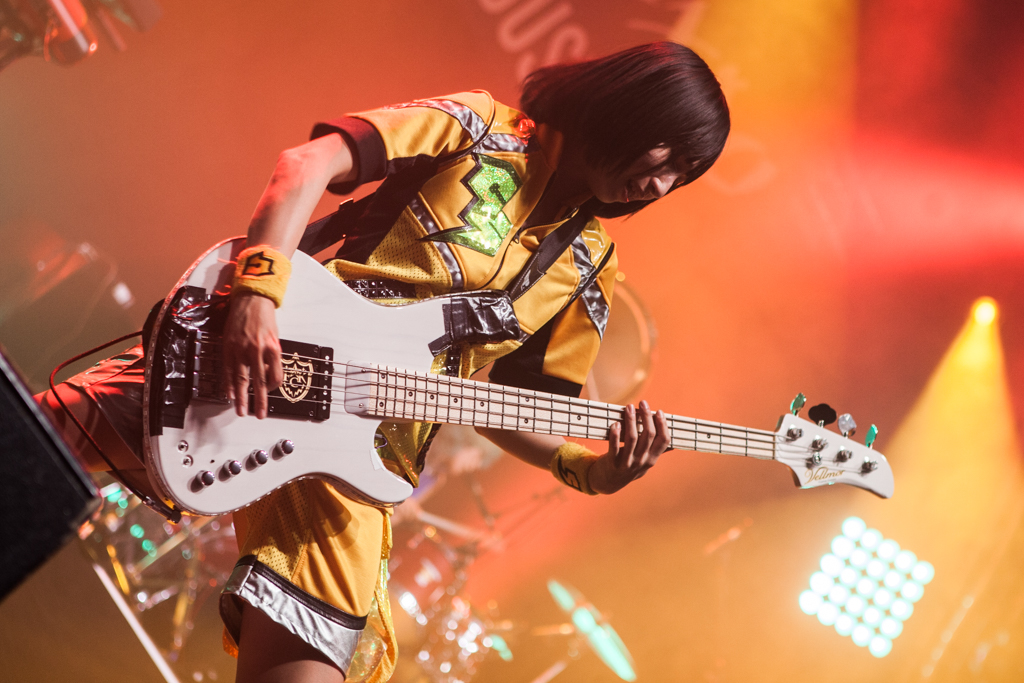
- F Chopper Koga at Japan Expo 2014

Background information
- Birth name: Michiko Koga
- Born: December 22, 1986 (age 38)
- Instrument: Bass guitar

Michiko Koga (Japanese: 古賀美智子, Hepburn: Koga Michiko), known professionally as F Chopper Koga (FチョッパーKOGA, Efu Choppā Koga), is a Japanese bass player and leader of the rock band Gacharic Spin. She has released two DVD instructional videos for her signature slap-bass technique. Koga is also a former model and a founding member of the bands the Pink Panda and Doll$Boxx.

== Career ==
=== The Pink Panda ===
Koga was the bass player for the band the Pink Panda, formed in 2002. The Pink Panda released 3 singles and 3 albums from 2004 to 2008 before Koga left the band after their final concert at Shibuya O-West on November 15, 2008.

=== Gacharic Spin ===
In 2009, Koga formed the band Gacharic Spin with high school classmate Hana.

=== Doll$Boxx ===
In 2012, Koga and other members of Gacharic Spin joined with Light Bringer vocalist Fuki to create the band Doll$Boxx. Koga had previously worked with Fuki when the singer filled in as Gacharic Spin's vocalist in 2012.

== Instructional series ==
In 2010, Atoss International released Koga's first bass instructional DVD titled Zettai Hajikeru! Slap Bass Cho Nyuumo ("Let's Play! Slap Bass Super Introduction"). The promotional video for the release featured Koga with Gacharic Spin bandmate Hana on drums.

In 2011, Koga's second instructional DVD was released, titled F Chopper Koga no Slap Bass Rakuchin Phrase Shu ("F Chopper Koga's Slap Bass Easy Phrasebook"). The promotional video featured Koga playing bass accompanied by Gacharic Spin's full lineup.

== Other works ==
=== Television ===
In 2001, Koga performed a guest role as a school bully in the television drama Kids War 3.

=== Film ===
In 2014, Koga and the other members of Gacharic Spin appeared as members of the fictional rock band Nosebleed in the film Metalca.

=== Video ===
Before becoming a full-time musician, Koga starred in several gravure modeling videos: Petit Angel Michiko Koga (2002), Petit in Wonderland (2002), Punyu Punyu (2004), and Qutie Pistols (2005).

Koga has also appeared as a frequent co-host of supplemental DVD talk program included with WeRocK!! Magazine.
