= Fuki (musician) =

Japanese singer

Fuki フキ
- Born: June 9 Tokyo, Japan
- Genres: Power metal; symphonic metal; speed metal; heavy metal; anison
- Occupations: Singer; songwriter
- Years active: 2005–present
- Labels: JVCKenwood Victor Entertainment, FABTONE Inc.
- Member of: Unlucky Morpheus; Doll$Boxx; Fuki Commune
- Formerly of: Light Bringer; Dragon Guardian; Magical Ninja

Fuki (フキ, Fuki) is a Japanese heavy metal singer. During her career, she was active in bands Light Bringer, Unlucky Morpheus, Doll$Boxx, and as a solo artist.

== Biography ==
Fuki was born on June 9 1986 in Tokyo. In 2005, she joined the power metal band Light Bringer as a vocalist. She joined Unlucky Morpheus in 2008 and Doll$Boxx in 2012, while remaining active in Light Bringer.

In 2014, Light Bringer went on an indefinite hiatus. Fuki made her solo debut under a name Fuki Commune in 2016, with an album titled Welcome!. It was ranked No. 25 on Oricon's albums chart. Her second album, Million Scarlets, released in June 2019, was ranked No. 18.

== Discography ==
=== Light Bringer ===
- Tales of Almanac (2009)
- Midnight Circus (2010)
- Genesis (2012)
- Scenes of Infinity (2013)
- Monument (2014)

=== Unlucky Morpheus ===
- Affected (2014)
- Vampir (2015)
- Change of Generation (2018)
- Unfinished (2020)
- Evolution (2022)

=== Dragon Guardian ===
- Dragonvarius (2009)
- 真実の石碑 (2010)
- 聖魔剣ヴァルキュリアス (2011)
- The Best of Dragon Guardian Saga (2012)

=== Doll$Boxx ===
- Dolls Apartment (2012)

=== Solo (Fuki Commune) ===
- Welcome! (2016)
- Million Scarlets (2019)

=== As a featured artist ===
- Anti-Queen of Hearts (Royal Scandal) (2024)
- Phantom Pain (Royal Scandal) (2025)
