= Unlucky Morpheus =

Japanese metal band

- Also known as: Ankimo (あんきも)
- Origin: Japan
- Genres: Power metal; neoclassical metal; speed metal; symphonic metal
- Years active: 2008–present
- Members: Shiren (紫煉); Fuki; Jinya (仁耶); Jill; Hiroyuki Ogawa; FUMIYA; Kasumi (歌澄)
- Website: sound.jp/ankimo/

Unlucky Morpheus, often abbreviated as Ankimo (あんきも), is a Japanese power metal band formed in 2008. It consists of vocalist Fuki, guitarists Shiren and Jinya, bassist Ogawa Hiroyuki, drummer Fumiya Morishita, and violinist Jill. Vocalist Kasumi is not a regular member of the band, but has participated in some of the band's recordings and live performances. Their latest album, "Gate of Hell", was released in 2026.

== History ==
Unlucky Morpheus was formed in 2008 by Fuki (vocals) and Shiren (guitar) after having met the year prior. On October 3, 2008, the band released their first mini-album, Hypothetical Box, an arrangement album of compositions from the Touhou Project series, at the dōjin event "M3" on a home made CD-R.

The band released their first professionally pressed CD, REBIRTH, at the dōjin event "Hakurei Jinja Reitaisai" on March 8, 2009. Later that year on October 12 they played their first live show at Tamachi CUBE (田町CUBE).

On January 6, 2011, they performed their final show of the "Fuyu no Mikaku no Tabearuki 2010→2011" tour at Shibuya O-EAST. This show was recorded and released as their first live album Fuyumika Tabearuki Final ~Lunatic East~ LIVE (ふゆみか食べ歩きファイナル ～Lunatic East～ LIVE) on both CD and DVD on 2011-05-08.

On August 16, 2014, the band released the album affected, their first to consist entirely of original compositions.

The band released their first music video, "Black Pentagram", on April 9, 2017, on YouTube to promote their EP of the same name released on December 29, 2016.

On September 19, 2018, the band released the album Change of Generation, their first release to chart, peaking at 26 on the Oricon charts.

The sub-unit, "Quadratum From Unlucky Morpheus" (composed of Jinya, Jill, Hiroyuki Ogawa and FUMIYA), released their first album, Loud Playing Workshop on January 27, 2021. It featured covers of popular heavy metal songs, including a violin cover of Van Halen's "Eruption".

=== Unholy Orpheus ===
Unholy Orpheus is a melodic death metal project by the five members of Unlucky Morpheus, excluding Fuki.

In a column for Geki-Rock, Shiren stated that he always wanted to create his own melodic death metal album, having been strongly influenced by a Children of Bodom concert he saw while in high school. Unholy Orpheus's debut album what is DEATH? was released on May 29, 2024. The album primarily features Shiren's harsh vocals, while Fuki appears as a guest vocalist on "TRAUMATA".

== Band members ==
- Shiren (紫煉) – composer, arranger, guitar, harsh vocals, programming, backing vocals
- Fuki – vocals, backing vocals, lyricist, web development
- Jinya (仁耶) – guitar
- Jill – violin
- Hiroyuki Ogawa – bass guitar
- FUMIYA – drums
- Kasumi (歌澄) – manager, support vocals

== Discography ==
=== Major studio albums ===
Title	Album details	Peak positions
Title	Album details	JPN
Affected	Released: 2014-08-16; Label: None (ANKM-0020); Formats: CD	—
Vampir	Released: 2015-04-26; Label: None (ANKM-0021); Formats: CD	—
Change of Generation	Released: 2018-09-19; Label: None (ANKM-0030); Formats: CD	26
Unfinished	Released: 2020-07-29; Label: None (ANKM-0036); Formats: CD	15
Evolution	Released: 2022-04-27; Label: None (ANKM-0041); Formats: CD	16
Gate of Heaven	Released: 2025-11-26; Label: Fabtone Inc. (ANKM-0051); Formats: CD	30
Gate of Hell	Released: 2026-06-03; Label: Fabtone Inc. (ANKM-0053); Formats: CD	26

=== Major live albums ===
Title	Album details	Peak positions
Title	Album details	JPN
Live 2017 CD	Released: 2017-08-11; Label: None (ANKM-0026); Formats: CD	—
"XIII" Live at Toyosu PIT CD	Released: 2022-03-09; Label: None (ANKM-0039, ANKM-0040); Formats: CD	49
Evolution & Diversity Live 2022 at Zepp DiverCity CD	Released: 2023-03-08; Label: None (ANKM-0043, ANKM-0044); Formats: CD	49
15th Anniversary Live Tour 2024 Reincarnation Live at Toyosu Pit CD	Released: 2025-06-04; Label: Fabtone Inc. (ANKM-0050); Formats: CD	—

=== Extended plays ===
Title	EP details	Peak chart positions
Title	EP details	JPN
Black Pentagram	Released: 2016-12-29; Label: None (ANKM-0024); Formats: CD	—
Cadaver / Revadac	Released: 2018-03-28; Label: None (ANKM-0027); Formats: CD	—
Takiyashahime (瀧夜叉姫)	Released: 2020-04-29; Label: None (ANKM-0035); Formats: CD	24

=== Major singles ===
Title	Single details	Peak positions
Title	Single details	JPN
Wings	Released: 2015-08-14; Label: None (ANKM-0022); Formats: CD	—
"M" Revolution	Released: 2021-09-12; Label: None; Formats: digital download	—
Sekai Rinne (世界輪廻)	Released: 2024-07-31; Label: Fabtone Inc. (ANKM-0046/47); Formats: CD	29
Sakura Chevalier	Released: 2025-03-05; Label: Fabtone Inc. (ANKM-0048); Formats: CD	29
Zen'aku no Higan (善悪の彼岸)	Released: 2025-12-24; Label: Fabtone Inc. (ANKM-0052); Formats: CD	48

=== Major live videos ===
Title	Album details	Peak positions
Title	Album details	JPN
Live 2017	Released: 2017-08-11; Label: None (ANKM-0025); Formats: DVD	—
Change of Generation Tour Final	Released: 2019-07-31; Label: None (ANKM-0032); Formats: Blu-ray	—
"XIII" Live at Toyosu Pit Blu-ray	Released: 2022-03-09; Label: None (ANKM-0038); Formats: Blu-ray	13
Evolution & Diversity Live 2022 at Zepp DiverCity Blu-ray	Released: 2023-03-08; Label: None (ANKM-0042); Formats: Blu-ray	11
15th Anniversary Live Tour 2024 Reincarnation Live at Toyosu Pit Blu-ray	Released: 2025-06-04; Label: Fabtone Inc. (ANKM-0049); Formats: Blu-ray	10

=== Dōjin studio albums ===
Title	Release date	Catalog number
Hypothetical Box	October 13, 2008	ANKM-0000
Rebirth	March 8, 2009	ANKM-0001
So That a Star Shines at Night Sky	May 5, 2009	ANKM-0002
Amazement Park!!	July 19, 2009	ANKM-0003
Jealousy	August 30, 2009	ANKM-0004
Unbeatable Accomplice	October 11, 2009	ANKM-0005
Hypothetical Box Act 2	May 5, 2010	ANKM-0006
Byōgin Kishō (猫吟鬼嘯)	August 14, 2010	ANKM-0007
Heavy Metal Be-Bop	August 13, 2011	ANKM-0012
Faith and Warfare	December 30, 2011	ANKM-0013
U&I Eurobeat Remix	December 30, 2011	ANKM-0014
Parallelism・α	August 11, 2012	ANKM-0015
Parallelism・β	December 30, 2012	ANKM-0016
Parallelism・γ	December 30, 2012	UNUN-0001
Miseria Kills Slaughterously	December 30, 2013	ANKM-0018
Signs	May 11, 2014	ANKM-0019
Rebirth Revisited	December 30, 2015	ANKM-0023
Saireco Jealousy	May 6, 2018	ANKM-0028
Heikō Jikū no Ongakukai (並行時空の音楽会)	May 5, 2019	ANKM-0031
Hypothetical Box ACT3	August 12, 2019	ANKM-0033

=== Dōjin live albums ===
Title	Release date	Catalog number
Fuyumika Tabearuki Final ~Lunatic East~ LIVE CD (ふゆみか食べ歩きファイナル ～Lunatic East～ LIVE CD)	May 8, 2011	ANKM-0009/0010/0011
Kiseki no Heijitsu (奇跡の平日)	August 10, 2018	ANKM-0029

=== Dōjin compilation albums ===
Title	Release date	Catalog number
Visual Rock History ~Raddock & XI All Songs Collection~ (Visual Rock History ～ラドック＆XI All Songs Collection～)	August 12, 2013	YUKI-0001/0002
Best of Dramatic Melody	August 12, 2013	ANKM-0017

=== Dōjin live videos ===
Title	Release date	Catalog number
Fuyumika Tabearuki Final ~Lunatic East~ LIVE DVD (ふゆみか食べ歩きファイナル ～Lunatic East～ LIVE DVD)	May 8, 2011	ANKM-0008
Lunatic East 2019 TOUR FINAL	March 22, 2020	ANKM-0034

=== As Quadratum From Unlucky Morpheus ===
==== Studio albums ====
Title	Album details
Loud Playing Workshop	Released: 2021-01-27; Label: None (ANKM-0037); Formats: CD

=== As Unholy Orpheus ===
==== Studio albums ====
Title	Album details	Peak positions
Title	Album details	JPN
What Is Death?	Released: 2024-05-29; Label: Fabtone Inc. (ANKM-0045); Formats: CD	30
