= J-Pop Summit =

Annual music event in San Francisco, California

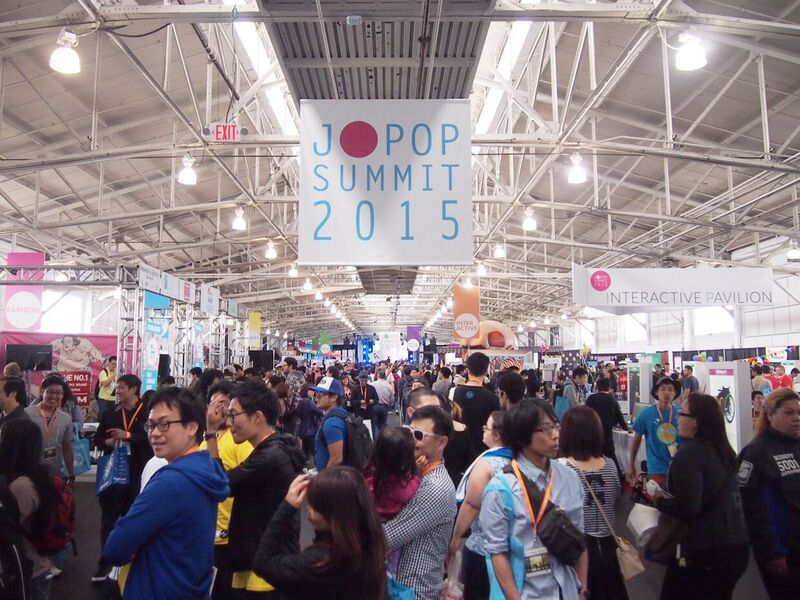
J-POP SUMMIT 2015 (Aug 7–9)

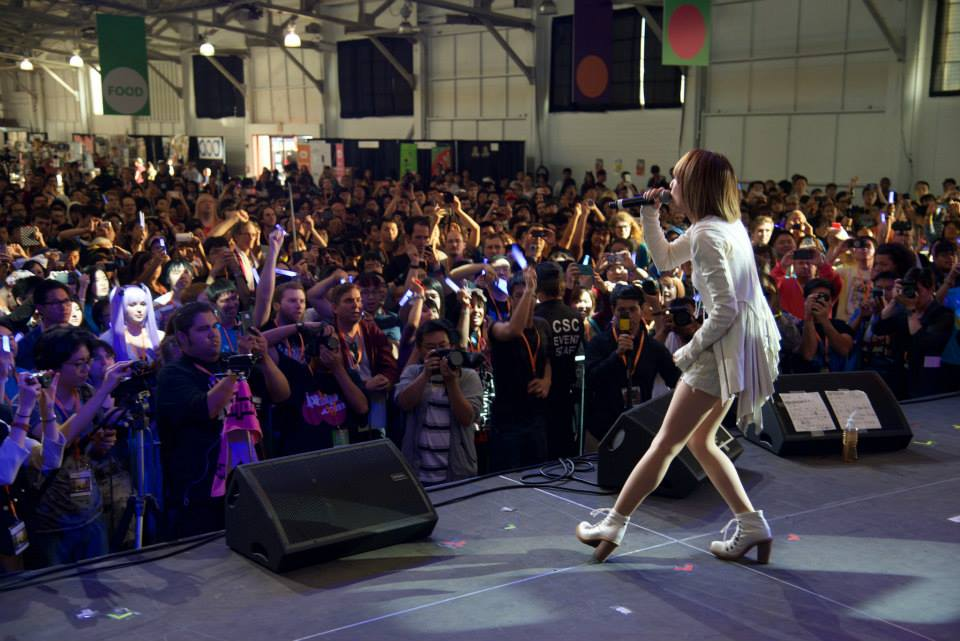
Music live by Eir Aoi at J-POP SUMMIT 2015

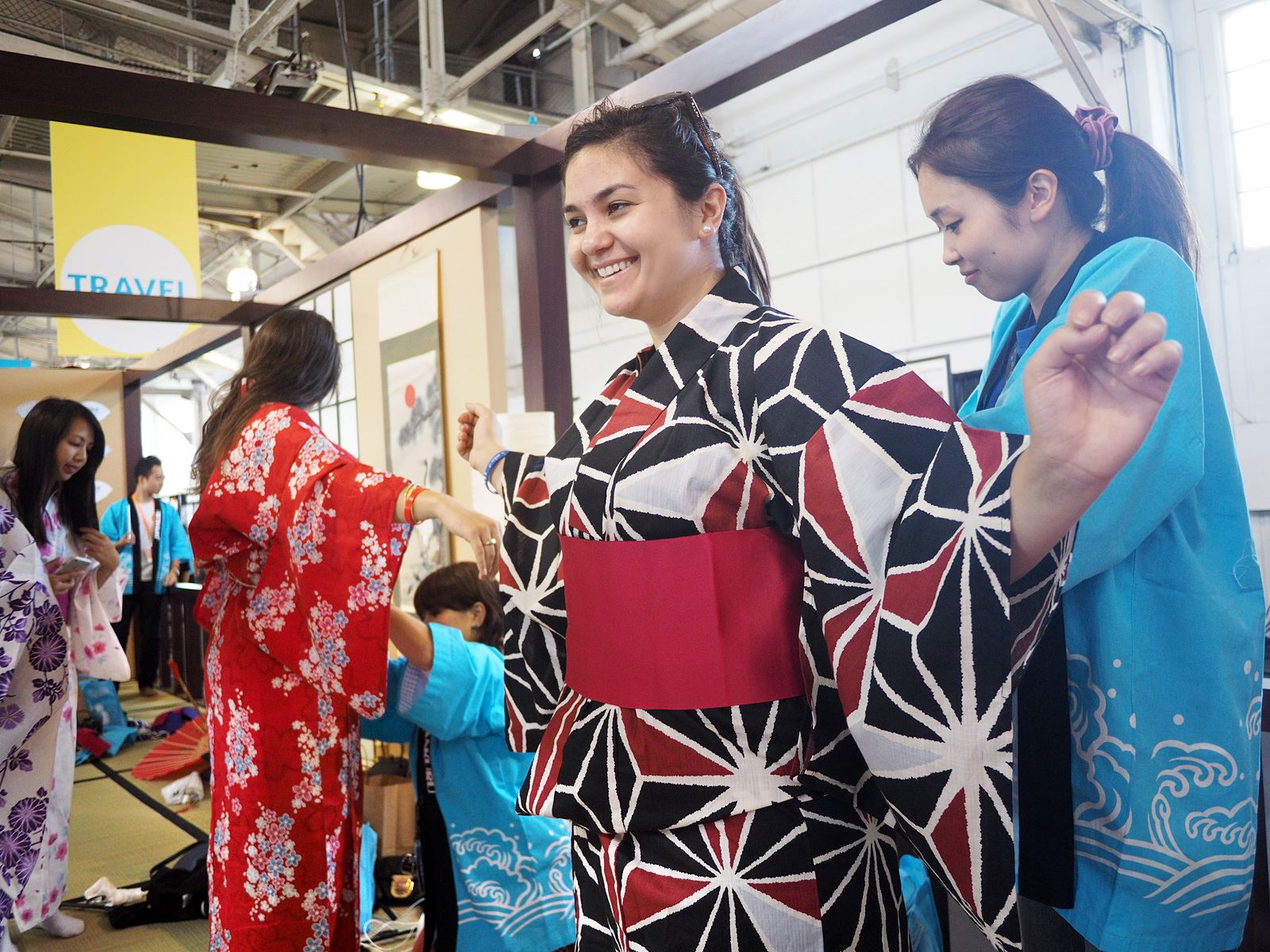
Travel Pavilion at J-POP SUMMIT 2015

J-Pop Summit was a Japanese cultural festival held every summer between 2009 and 2017 in San Francisco, California, United States. It was hosted by Superfrog Project, a 501(c)(3) non-profit organization.

The festival brought together different aspects of Japanese culture, including music, fashion, film, art, games, tech innovations, anime, food, as well as niche subcultures.

== History ==
J-POP SUMMIT first took place as the opening ceremony of the New People building at Japantown in San Francisco in 2009, and became an annual festival of Japanese pop culture, including anime, manga, food, sake, games, fashion, films, and music. In recent years, the festival added sections related to tech innovations and travel. The event provided an opportunity for Japanese companies to expand their business to the U.S. market.

In 2014, the festival was held in Japantown and had over 125,000 in attendance over two days. In 2015, the festival re-launched as an indoor event and expanded its area to different locations in the city: Fort Mason Center, Union Square, New People Cinema, and Castro Theatre.

The theme of J-Pop Summit was "Pop is our Tradition".

In 2018, the festival announced that they would not be hosting J-Pop Summit that year. While there was no official announcement of the end of J-Pop Summit, their website has not posted any other news about the summit since.

== Japan Film Festival of San Francisco ==
The Japan Film Festival (JFFSF) was held alongside J-Pop Summit for about two weeks. Originally the 'film' section of J-Pop Summit, JFFSF became an independent festival in 2013. Tadanobu Asada, a Japanese actor, received the first Japan Film Festival of San Francisco Honorary Award at the opening night event held at Castro Theatre in 2015.

In 2020, they decided to postpone their next festival due to the COVID-19 pandemic; however, no news has been posted since.

== See also ==
- History of the Japanese in San Francisco
