= King Records (Japan) =

Japanese record label

King Record Co., Ltd.
- Native name: キングレコード株式会社
- Romanized name: Kingu Rekōdo Kabushiki gaisha
- Type: Private
- Industry: Music
- Founded: January 1931; 95 years ago
- Headquarters: Otowa, Bunkyo, Tokyo, Japan
- Key people: Akio Mishima (president and CEO)
- Website: company.kingrecords.co.jp/en/

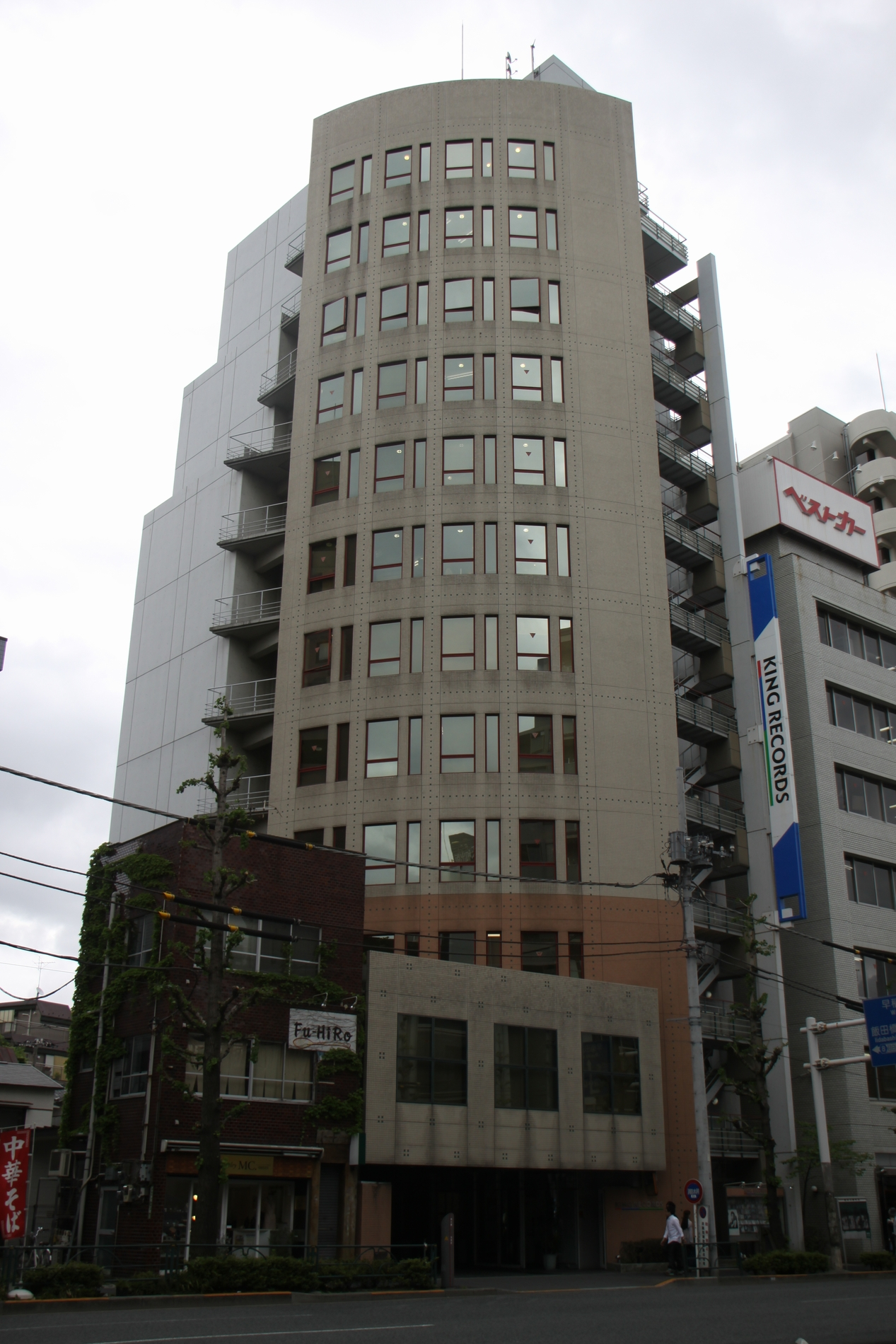
King Records head office

King Record Co., Ltd. (キングレコード株式会社, Kingu Rekōdo Kabushiki gaisha), commonly known as King Records, is a Japanese record company founded in January 1931 as a division of the Japanese publisher Kodansha. It initially began operating as an independent entity in the 1950s. It later became part of the Otowa Group. Today, King Records is one of Japan's largest record companies which is not owned by a multinational entity. The label's headquarters are in Bunkyo, Tokyo.

The label's name is actually based from the now-defunct Kingu magazine published by Kodansha from 1924 to 1957.

== Sub-labels ==
Its Starchild label, was managed by animation producer Toshimichi Ōtsuki, specialised in anime music and film. King Records also distributes the Up-Front Works–owned and –operated labels Piccolo Town and Rice Music, and also released video games for the PC-88, Famicom, Game Boy Advance, and MSX2 platforms. On February 1, 2016, King Records restructured Starchild and renamed it King Amusement Creative.

Paddle Wheel Records is a division of King Record Co.

You! Be Cool was the official sub-label for AKB48, and is currently used by STU48.

Venus-B is the company's official urban music imprint.

Evil Line Records is the label's new division, established in April 2014, and comprises artists like Momoiro Clover Z and Meg, among others.

Nexus is the label's division specialized for metal/underground music from Japan also overseas. Notable artists in it label are Earthshaker, etc.

Seven Seas is the label's division focusing on world music from overseas artists in many genres.

King Custom was a special division of King Records in Japan that began in the early 1960s. It allowed individuals to release their own works without oversight or promotional support from the label. King Records provided only the branding and distribution, leaving creators with full control over their content. This unique system supported independent and regional artists, preserving their artistic freedom while leveraging King Records' established reputation and network.

The division worked with the following matrix numbers: NCS (7-inch records), NDS (33⅓ RPM EPs) and NAS (LPs). The label was discontinued in the late 1980s.

== Notable artists ==
- Bolbbalgan4
- Stomu Yamashta
- Inoran
- Kana Uemura
- Nogod
- Takeshi Terauchi
- Akiko Nakamura
- Hiroko Moriguchi
- Morning Musume
- Tomomi Itano
- Atsuko Maeda
- Yuki Kashiwagi
- Momoland
- Miss Monochrome
- Aice5 (Evil Line)
- Earphones (Evil Line)
- Hypnosis Mic (Evil Line)
- Otsuki Miyako
- Momoiro Clover Z (Evil Line, formerly Starchild)
- Meg (Evil Line)
- Lynch.
- Theatre Brook
- Trident
- Haruka Fukuhara
- Sawa (Bellwood)
- Park Junyoung
- Hiroki Nanami
- Jan Linton (as dr jan guru) "Planet Japan"
- Rock A Japonica (Evil Line)
- Block B
- STU48
- Nana Mizuki (King Amusement Creative)
- Mamoru Miyano (King Amusement Creative)
- Suneohair (King Amusement Creative)
- Ryoko Shiraishi (King Amusement Creative)
- angela (King Amusement Creative)
- Ai Nonaka (King Amusement Creative)
- Yoko Takahashi (King Amusement Creative)
- Soichiro Hoshi (King Amusement Creative)
- Sumire Uesaka (King Amusement Creative)
- Inori Minase (King Amusement Creative)
- Shouta Aoi (King Amusement Creative)
- Satomi Sato (King Amusement Creative)
- Yuuma Uchida (King Amusement Creative)
- Yui Horie (King Amusement Creative)
- Niji no Conquistador (King Amusement Creative)
- Miho Okasaki (King Amusement Creative)
- AIMI (King Amusement Creative)
- Mardelas (Nexus)
- Light Bringer (Nexus)

== Former artists ==
- Alice Nine (2005-2010; to Tokuma Japan Communications)
- AKB48 (You, Be Cool!) (2008-2023; to Universal Music Japan)
- CHAGE and ASKA (1985-1999; to Toshiba EMI)
- Eri Kitamura (2011-2016; to TMS Music)
- GFriend (2018-2021)
- Kagrra,
- Masumi Asano
- Matenrou Opera (to self-owned amairo records)
- Mikako Komatsu (2012-2016; to Toy's Factory)
- Megumi Hayashibara (1991-2019; freelance)
- Masami Okui (1993-2004; to Geneon until 2011 when she signed with Lantis)
- Michiyo Azusa
- Miho Nakayama
- Minori Chihara (2004)
- Sung Si-kyung (2023 -)
- Neko Jump (2006-2011; Former overseas partner of Kamikaze)
- Sound Horizon to Pony Canyon
- the pillows (1994-2006; to avex trax)
- The Gazette (2005-2010; to Sony Music Japan)
- TWO-MIX (1995-1998; to Warner Music Japan)
- YuiKaori
- Yui Sakakibara to 5pb. Records
- Yui Ogura (2012-2022; King Amusement Creative; to Nippon Columbia)
- Yukari Tamura
- Yuki Uchida
- Yuko Ogura

== See also ==
- Starchild, the former label under King Records
