= Government of Pittsburgh =

Governing bodies of Pittsburgh

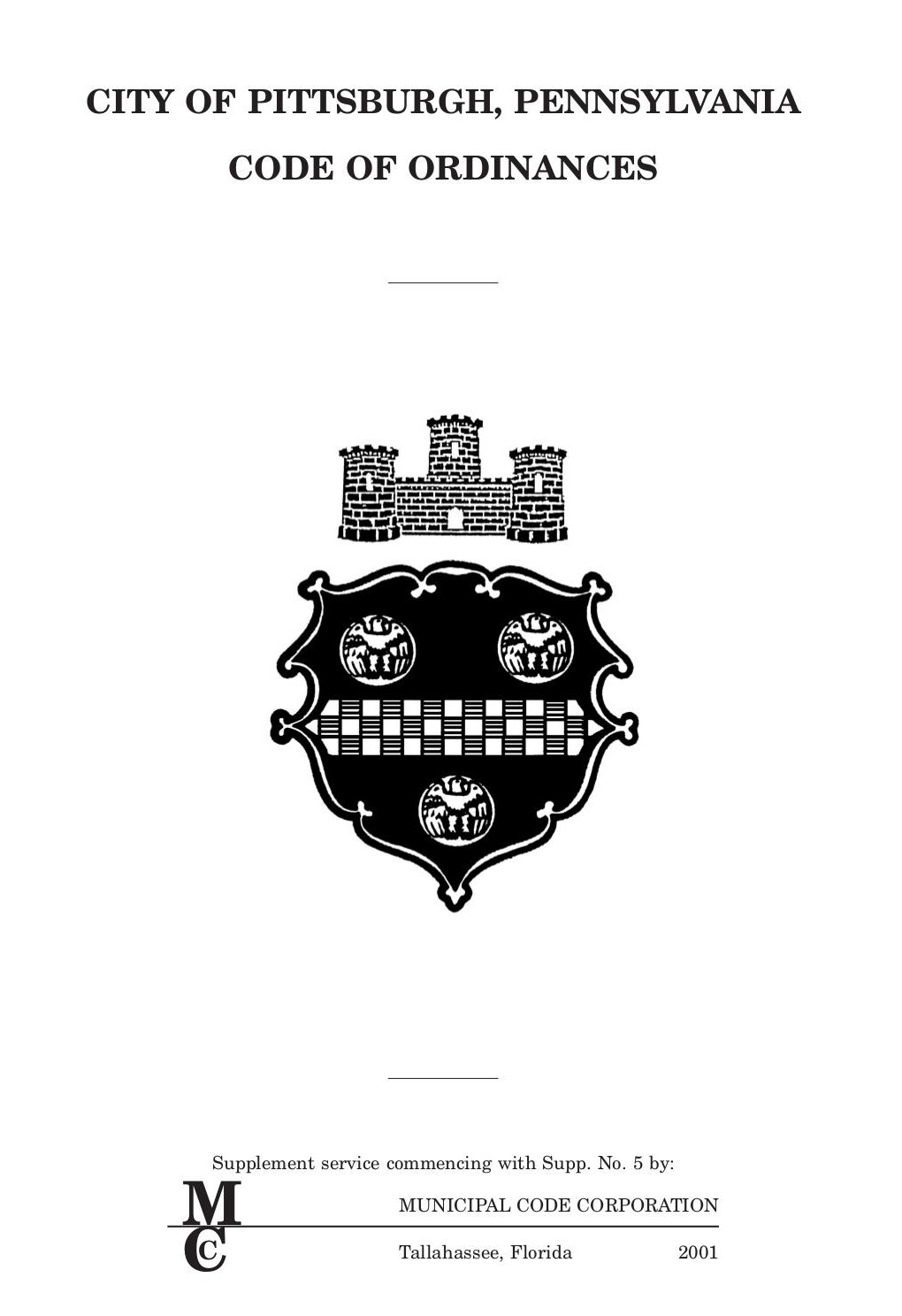
Title page of the Pittsburgh Code of Ordinances

The Government of Pittsburgh is composed of the Mayor, the City Council, and various boards and commissions. Most of these offices are housed within the Pittsburgh City-County Building. The Government of Pittsburgh receives its authority from the Pennsylvania General Assembly pursuant to Part III of Title 53 of the Pennsylvania Consolidated Statutes, relating to Cities of the Second Class.

== Mayor ==
The Mayor of Pittsburgh is elected every 4 years. The current mayor is Corey O'Connor. Since the 1950s the Mayor's Chief of Staff has assumed a large role in advising, long term planning and as a "gatekeeper" to the mayor.

== City Council ==
The Pittsburgh City Council is a nine-member city council. City council members are chosen by plurality elections in each of nine districts.

== Law enforcement ==
The mayor appoints (with City Council approval) the position of Pittsburgh Police Chief. The city and its immediate suburbs are served by the four-year elected Allegheny County District Attorney to prosecute criminal offenses and the congressionally appointed U.S. District Attorney for the Western District of Pennsylvania for federal offenses. The city and its residents are also served by the elected four-year term Allegheny County Sheriff and the County council-appointed Allegheny County Police Department Chief.

== Pittsburgh Intergovernmental Cooperation Authority ==
Pittsburgh finances are subject to the Pittsburgh Intergovernmental Cooperation Authority, the city's state-appointed financial oversight body.

== Boards, Authorities and Commissions ==
Many governmental functions are carried out by boards, authorities and commissions. These organizations include:

- Allegheny County Sanitary Authority
- Allegheny Regional Asset District Board
- Pittsburgh Parking Authority
- Sports and Exhibition Authority
- Urban Redevelopment Authority of Pittsburgh
- Pittsburgh Stadium Authority

== See also ==
- Government of Pennsylvania
