= Stadium Authority of the City of Pittsburgh =

Municipal authority

Coordinates: 40°26′41″N 79°59′42″W

Agency overview
- Formed: March 9, 1964
- Jurisdiction: City of Pittsburgh
- Agency executive: Mike Danovitz, Chairman

The Stadium Authority of the City of Pittsburgh (also known as the Stadium Authority) is a municipal authority that was charged with the construction of Three Rivers Stadium and the management of the land on which it stood following its 2001 demolition.

It currently owns the West General Robinson Street Garage and surface parking lots near PNC Park and Acrisure Stadium. The Stadium Authority also leases parking facilities north of PNC Park.

== History ==
The Stadium Authority of the City of Pittsburgh was formed on March 9, 1964 by the City of Pittsburgh under the authority given to the city by the Public Auditorium Authorities Law of the Commonwealth of Pennsylvania. The Stadium Authority board is comprised on five members, all appointed by the Mayor of Pittsburgh.

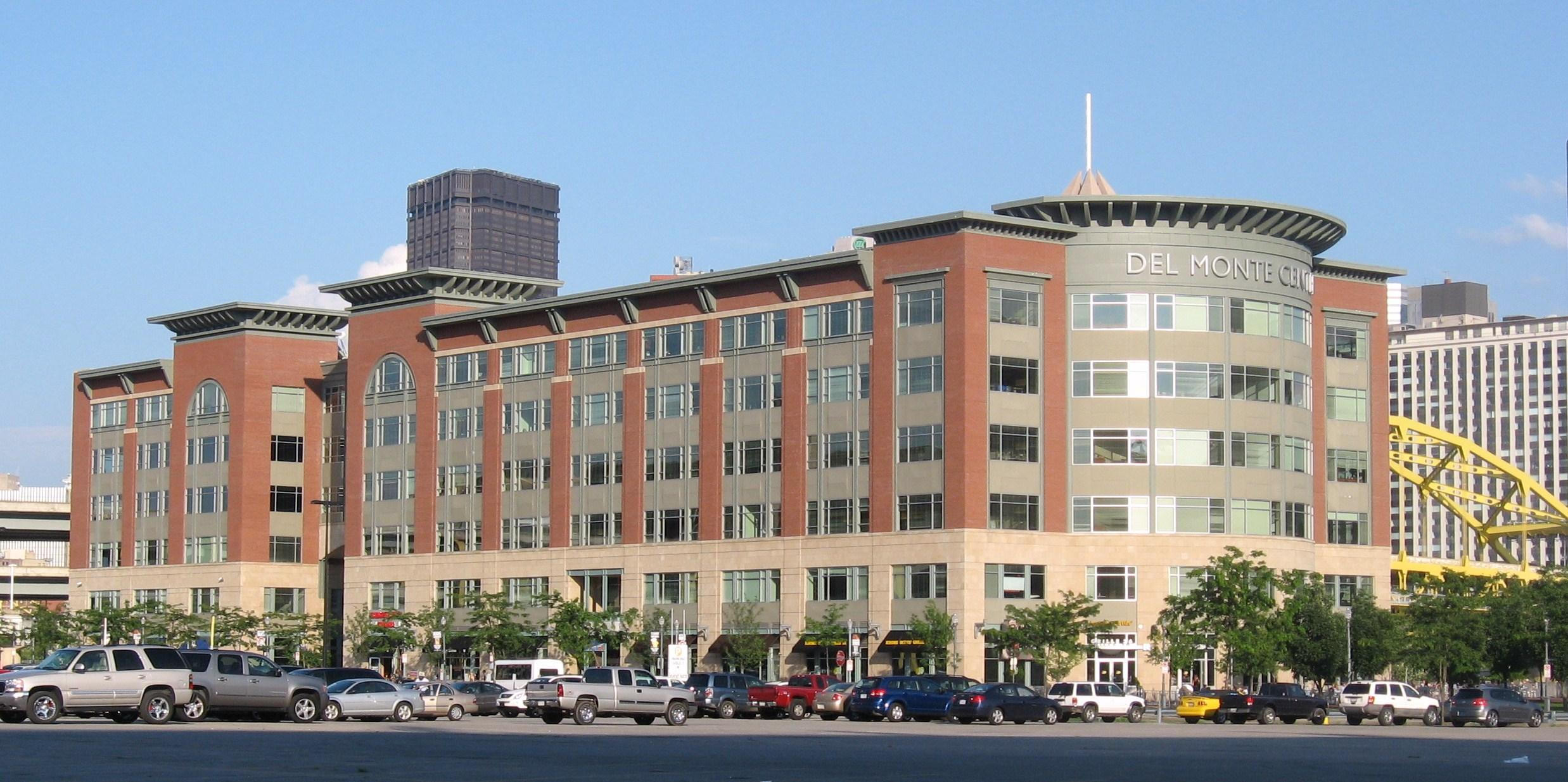
The Del Monte Building

In 2003, the Stadium Authority began a development project in an area called the "Option Area" that allowed the Pittsburgh Steelers and the Pittsburgh Pirates to develop commercial property in conjunction with North Shore Developers. The plan currently has completed the Equitable Resources building and the Del Monte Building.

The Pittsburgh Intergovernmental Cooperation Authority, a special administrative authority that supervises the finances of the City of Pittsburgh, has said that the Stadium Authority is no longer necessary and recommended in 2004 that its duties be consolidated into the Sports & Exhibition Authority of Pittsburgh and Allegheny County. However, as of 2016, the Stadium Authority still exists and continues to manage parking lots in the North Shore area. This incongruity has led to some wry attention from local journalists and pundits—for example, University of Pittsburgh economist Chris Briem has referred to it as the "Stadium(less) Authority".
