= St. Marys Area Water Authority =

Agency overview
- Type: municipal authority
- Jurisdiction: Elk County, Pennsylvania
- Headquarters: 967 State Street; St. Marys, Pennsylvania
- Employees: 5-10
- Agency executive: Dwight Hoare, Manager

St. Marys Area Water Authority is a municipal authority providing water supply services in Elk County, Pennsylvania.

Dwight Hoare is the agency's present general manager.

In February 2017, the water authority announced that members of the agency's leadership had unanimously approved a rate increase in response to increased operation costs and upgrades resulting from the construction of two water storage tanks for the city's distribution system. That increase was effective March 1, 2017, and included an adjustment to metered usage; however, the fixed, quarterly readiness-to-serve the charge based on water meter size did not change. Prior to the increase, the rate structure for a typical residential customer included a fixed quarterly charge of $22, plus additional charges incurred based on metered usage (calculated at the rate of $3.57 per thousand gallons used for the first three sets of pumping). The new metered rate increased by 12 percent (to $4 per 1,000 gallons) for residential, commercial and industrial customers, meaning that the average residential customer saw his/her/their rate climb from $93.40 to $102 per quarter. Prior to this the agency had last hiked water rates on March 1, 2014.

In November 2018, the Elk County Office of Emergency Services reported that St. Marys Water Authority customers located south of West Theresia Road in the city of St. Marys and Fox Township were experiencing a "water outage" (service disruption).
