= Off-budget enterprise =

Off-budget enterprises (OBEs, or special districts) are a type of government in the United States, the United Kingdom and the European Union. OBEs use public funds to further public (as in education) or private (as in economic revitalization) interests. Regulated by various state and federal laws, they operate outside the regulations for general-purpose government and public scrutiny, although many states have created oversight authorities of one form or another. They achieve self-funding by usually having taxation authority or fund themselves through fees for services rendered. Some have the ability to raise revenue bonds. The fastest-growing OBE is the industrial development agency which issues tax-exempt industrial revenue bonds to finance private business ventures mainly to revitalize economically depressed areas. Many are formed to deal with special local situations. The most common OBE is the School district.

In 1962 there were 18,323 OBEs and in 1998 there were nearly 30,000. Some OBEs receive funding from the federal government in the form of block grants.

== Examples ==
- Amtrak
- Tennessee Valley Authority (TVA)
- US Postal Service
- School district
- Port Authority
- United Kingdom Atomic Energy Authority
- Sovkhoz

== Criticism ==
Political scientists Robert E. England and David R. Morgan state, "Through OBEs, Detroit is now dominated by business elites." Within the EU, accusations have been made that off-budget enterprises are sometimes used by national governments to circumvent the Stability and Growth Pact, as public debt will no longer appear in the annual budget deficit and in total public debt, which may not exceed certain percentages of GDP (3% and 60% respectively) under the Maastricht criteria. During the past years, there have been various disputes between the European Commission and national governments on the classification of such enterprises.

== See also ==
- Quasi-autonomous non-government organisation - A UK definition
- Special-purpose district
- Municipal Authority
- Government monopoly
- Fiscal policy
- Government-owned corporation
- Public company
- Crown corporation
