= Managing Urban America =

1979 book by David R. Morgan, Robert E. England and John Peter Pelissero

- Book cover for Managing Urban America (Fourth Edition)
- Author: David R. Morgan, Robert E. England, John Peter Pelissero
- Publication date: 1979

Managing Urban America (first published in 1979) is a book that provides an academic overview and introduction to local urban planning and management in the United States, written by David R. Morgan, Robert E. England and John Peter Pelissero.

The book is divided into four parts (following the introductory material):

- "The Environment of Urban Management"
- "Making and Implementing Urban Policy"
- "Internal Management Processes"
- "The Urban Future"

The publishers claim that the book is "the dominant" textbook in its field, and it is used in well over a hundred college classes, as well as being cited in professional journals.

== Individualism and government ==
In recent editions, the book stipulates that groups have urged decentralization and citizen participation. It emphasizes an important need for individuals to exercise a greater degree of control over local services and facilities, and ask how much democracy really exists in the United States. The book states that the U.S. is entering an executive era, and legislatures are increasingly writing laws in broad terms which allow a great deal of flexible interpretation by those who implement the laws.

The authors claim that "until recently, many assumed that city governments would continue to grow and prosper". A report from the International City Management Association had suggested that the inevitability of growth was so widely accepted that it functioned as fact. At the time, the concept of virtually endless growth was common, both from the perspective of commercial land development, and from planners seeking to facilitate such growth.

== Fiscal issues ==
Federal aid began to shrink in the 1970s. Later, between 1980 and 1987, under Reagan's New federalism, federal aid dropped 55%, while cuts were made to government-funded services and tax rates were increased. Cities were now left on their own in a new era of fend-for-yourself federalism. City tax bases started shrinking as poverty remained high, while employment opportunities were limited.

The authors claim that fiscal stress produces dissatisfaction that leads to the public's disenchantment with elected officials. Noting the rapid deterioration of the public infrastructure, they predict a possible long-term decline, due not to a lack of resources, but an inability to use existing resources efficiently or effectively. They conclude that, in order to solve the problem, government must be transformed, and draw a connection between the complications caused by bureaucratic disputes within the various agencies of government, and the resulting problems faced by cities.

Morgan and England sought comments from various officials on their views of cities and urban decay — such as Sidney J. Barthelemy, mayor of New Orleans, who responded by saying that "cities are seen as hopeless places." Michael White, mayor of Cleveland, Ohio, commented, "Cities are becoming a codename for crumbling neighborhoods." John Herbers said, "The failure of Washington and the states is a major reason some urban areas continue in distress."

Morgan and England suggests that wealthy have moved out of the cities, leaving only those who are so poor they cannot leave. This is known as urban exodus. The authors note, "Many local officials frequently object to what they feel are excessive restrictions accompanying federal grants. Officials view the grant process as complex, overly detailed, slow, cumbersome and ineffective."

Former Flint, Michigan city manager Brian Rapp and community development director Frank Patitucci believe, "The most important consequence of overregulation is excessive administrative costs. If the man-hours required for federal reporting and accounting could be devoted to running programs, performance could be improved immeasurably."

Knoxville mayor Victor Ashe: "Congress has decided that it can impose anything that it wants. It's going to drive us all into bankruptcy." The authors thus argue that political accountability is reduced because citizens are confused about which government is responsible for which activities.

The status quo usually carries the day. Off-budget enterprises have placed the Detroit government into the hands of businesses.

As an example, in 1976 the regional council for the Oklahoma City metropolitan area (ACOG) received 90% of its funds from the federal government, but by 1988 this had dropped to 24%.

=== View on Urban Political Structure ===
Managing Urban America affirms that Americans want governmental change and that the government favors some groups and puts others at a disadvantage. Throwing the rascals out might not be enough. Basic institutions have to be changed. The problem of corruption has been compounded by the political machine. Through political organization, those holding office have found it possible to perpetuate themselves in power.

The book urges that politics should be based on public rather than on private motives and should stress honesty.

It suggests that the modern reform movement is not a product of the working-class but of upper-income and business groups who seek a political climate favorable to their growth and economic development. These are not true social reformers, however; they are interested in perpetuating the political agenda of the business community. Edward Banfield and James Q. Wilson both add, "Government must become more democratic."

Putting legislation on the ballot through a referendum is an attempt to make local government more responsive to the people. The same is true of the recall process, whereby a petition can force a new election. The initiative enables electors to force a public vote on an amendment or ordinance. Skeptics feel that voters are not well enough informed to vote intelligently. A recent International City Management Association survey showed strong support for direct democracy.

=== Scrutiny on Urban Policymaking ===
The literature suggests America is in the midst of a new age of skepticism regarding government. Some argue that an effective policy can be produced only through a small elite group while others worry about popular participation, but most agree that policymaking is vital to a community's well-being.

Morgan and England fear politicians tend to see themselves not as people required to respond to group demands but as people who once elected, may pursue their own agendas. Business interests are likely to fall into this category, the authors contend.

The discretion of administrative officials can be enormous, and the authors see government as gravitating towards policies with more immediate payoffs while avoiding those that require long-term planning.

According to Robert Salisbury, "A mayor is the head of locally oriented economic interests. City managers, like mayors and council-members, are overwhelmingly white males. The typical manager has been at his job for over 5 years and has served as an executive for over 10 years. In cities over 50,000 population, the city manager is likely to earn over $110,000."

== Editions ==
There have been six editions of the book. The 5th edition (ISBN 1-56643-065-8 (paperback)) was printed in 1999. The 6th edition (ISBN 1568029306) was published in 2007. The editions are updates; no chapters have been added or deleted.
