= Germantown Special Services District of Philadelphia =

Germantown Special Services District of Philadelphia is a municipal authority established to provide business improvement district services in the Germantown neighborhood of Northwest Philadelphia, in the U.S. state of Pennsylvania. It was created by Bill 1027 (18 April 1995) for an initial term of five years. However, Bill No. 000397 revised that termination date and set the District's date of expiration as 31 December 2025.
