= Pittsburgh Pet Expo =

Annual consumer pet show in Pennsylvania

The Pittsburgh Pet Expo is a consumer pet trade show that takes place annually in mid-autumn at the David L. Lawrence Convention Center in Downtown Pittsburgh, Pennsylvania, United States.

== Exhibits ==
With an estimated 14,000 spectators during the three days, the Pittsburgh Pet Expo is the second largest consumer pet trade show in the United States, covering over 2.5 acres of indoor space. The event originated in 2004. The event is highlighted by the annual Pet Olympics, which includes the International Judges Association (IJA) sanctioned Rescue Me Rodeo Grooming Competitions, Dock Diving, National Dachshund Races, and various agility competitions.

The event hosts roughly 250 local and national exhibitors and over 30 Animal Rescue Groups. In addition to the exhibits of pet-related products and services, the event hosts various types of entertainment and other hands-on activities. Dogs comprise most of the pets accompanying owners, but cats, birds, lizards, and other animals also participate.
