= North Shore Connector =

Light rail extension in Pittsburgh

North Shore Connector Tunnel
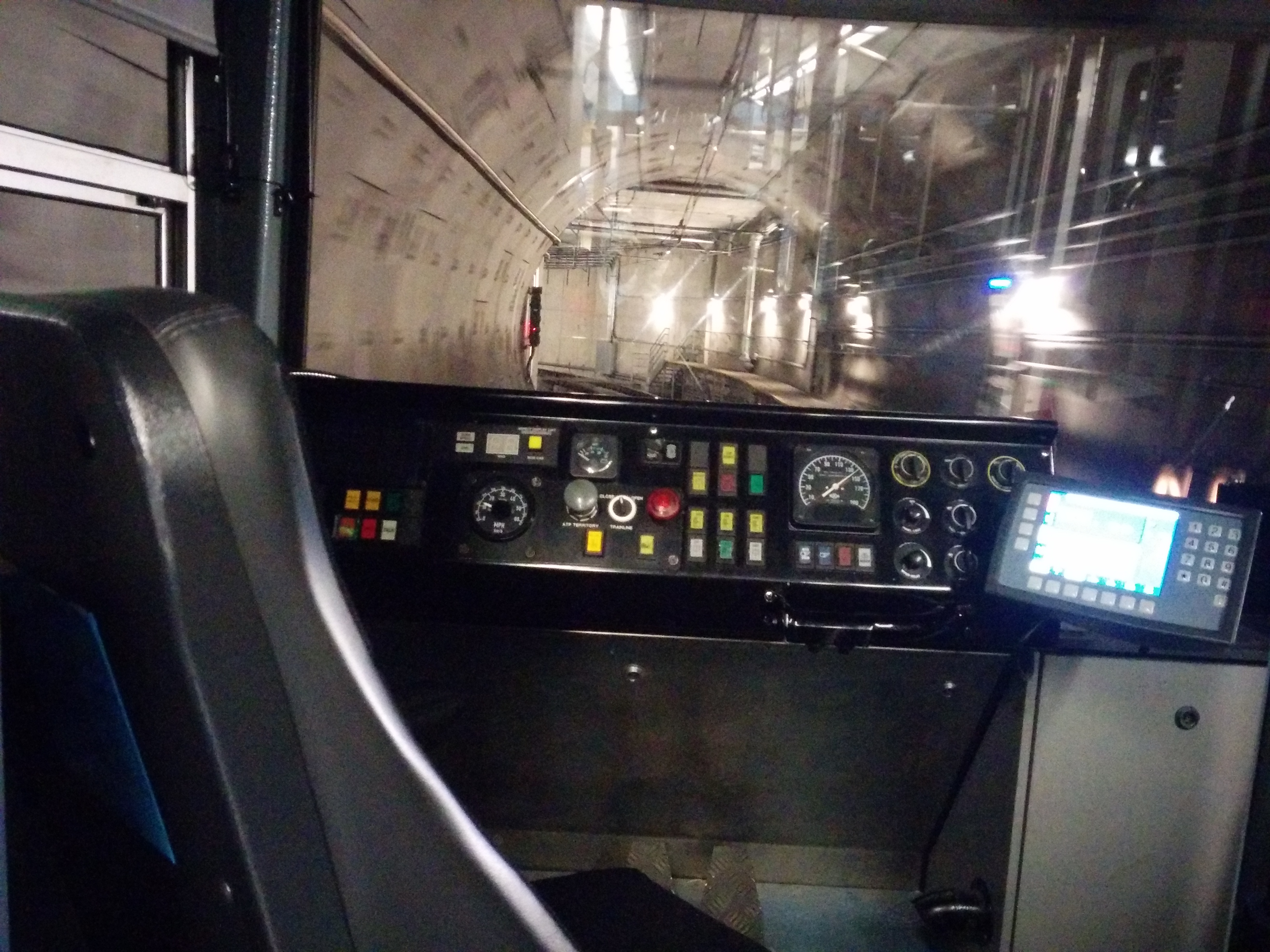
- Interactive map of North Shore Connector Tunnel

Overview
- Line: Blue Line Red Line Silver Line
- Location: Pittsburgh
- Coordinates: 40.4446°N 80.006°W
- System: Pittsburgh Light Rail
- Crosses: Allegheny River

Operation
- Work began: January 2008
- Opened: March 25, 2012
- Operator: Port Authority of Allegheny County

Technical
- Length: 2,240 ft (680 m)
- Line length: 1.2 mi (1.9 km)
- No. of tracks: 2
- Track gauge: 5 ft 2 1/2 in (1,588 mm) Pennsylvania trolley gauge

Allegheny station and North Side station were newly constructed as part of the North Shore Connector project, while Gateway station was completely reconstructed.

The North Shore Connector is a light rail extension that opened in 2012 in Pittsburgh, Pennsylvania. The connector extends the Pittsburgh Light Rail system from its previous terminus at Gateway station in downtown to the new North Side and Allegheny stations on the North Shore by way of a tunnel under the Allegheny River. The Connector extends the light rail system's "Free Fare Zone", enabling passengers to ride to and from Pittsburgh's rapidly growing North Shore neighborhood for free.

Planned since the late 1990s, the North Shore Connector received federal funding on February 6, 2004 and had crews complete the initial bore under the river on July 10, 2008. The Connector had a "soft opening" on Friday, March 23, 2012, with regular service beginning March 25, 2012. The final cost of the project was $523.4 million.

== Areas and attractions served ==
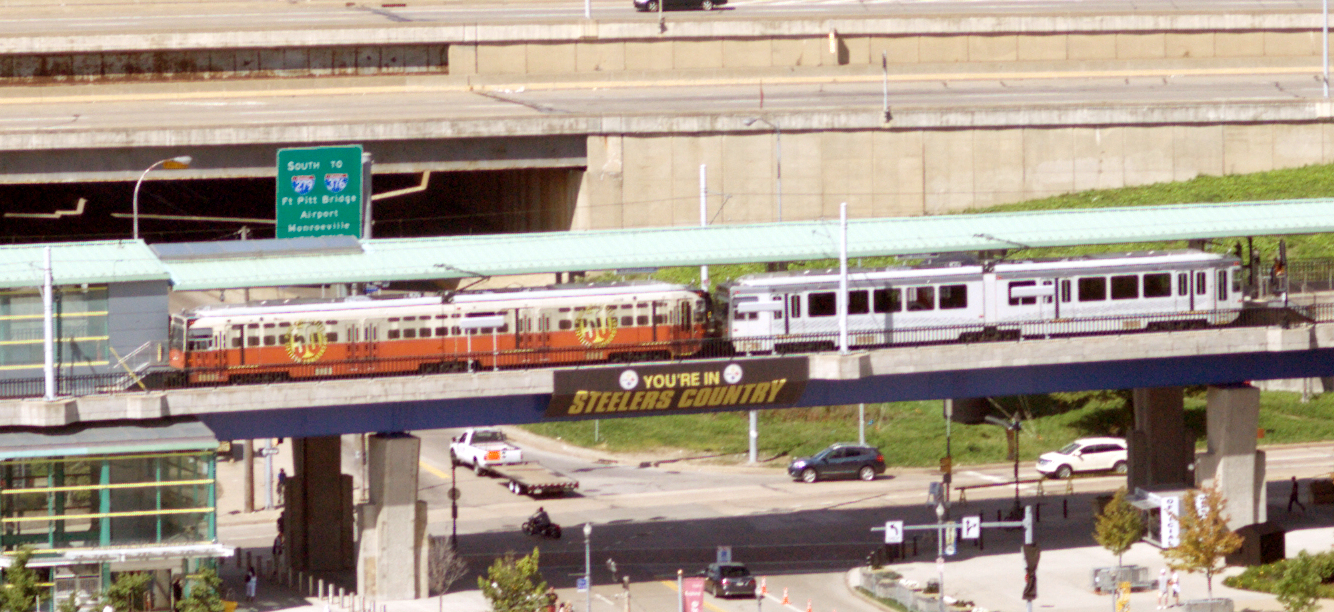
Allegheny station, serving Acrisure Stadium and Carnegie Science Center. Notice the Pittsburgh Steelers banner prominently displayed.

The North Shore neighborhood of Pittsburgh evolved from a "sea of asphalt" in the 1990s to a bustling extension of downtown reflecting approximately one billion dollars of investment and construction in the first decade of the 2000s. The North Shore Connector links Pittsburgh's previously 25-mile light rail network to the new businesses and attractions of the North Shore, serving commuters, visitors, and sports event attendees alike.

The North Side station serves the PNC Park baseball stadium (1.75 million annual fans) and the Community College of Allegheny County (7,200 students). Allegheny station serves residents in Allegheny West and Manchester, as well as visitors to the Acrisure Stadium (500,000 annual fans, excluding concerts), the Carnegie Science Center (700,000 annual visitors), Children's Museum of Pittsburgh (250,000 annual visitors) and the Rivers Casino. During weekdays, some downtown-destined vehicle commuters use the Connector by parking in one of the many North Shore parking facilities and completing their commute on the Connector.

Other businesses and attractions served include the Del Monte corporate headquarters (600 employees), Equitable Resources (450 employees), the SpringHill Suites Marriott Hotel and other nearby hotels, Stage AE North Shore Amphitheater (indoor concert venue with an outdoor amphitheater with lawn for 5,500 visitors opening December 2010), the Andy Warhol Museum (90,000 visitors), and many other night spots and restaurants.

== Reception ==
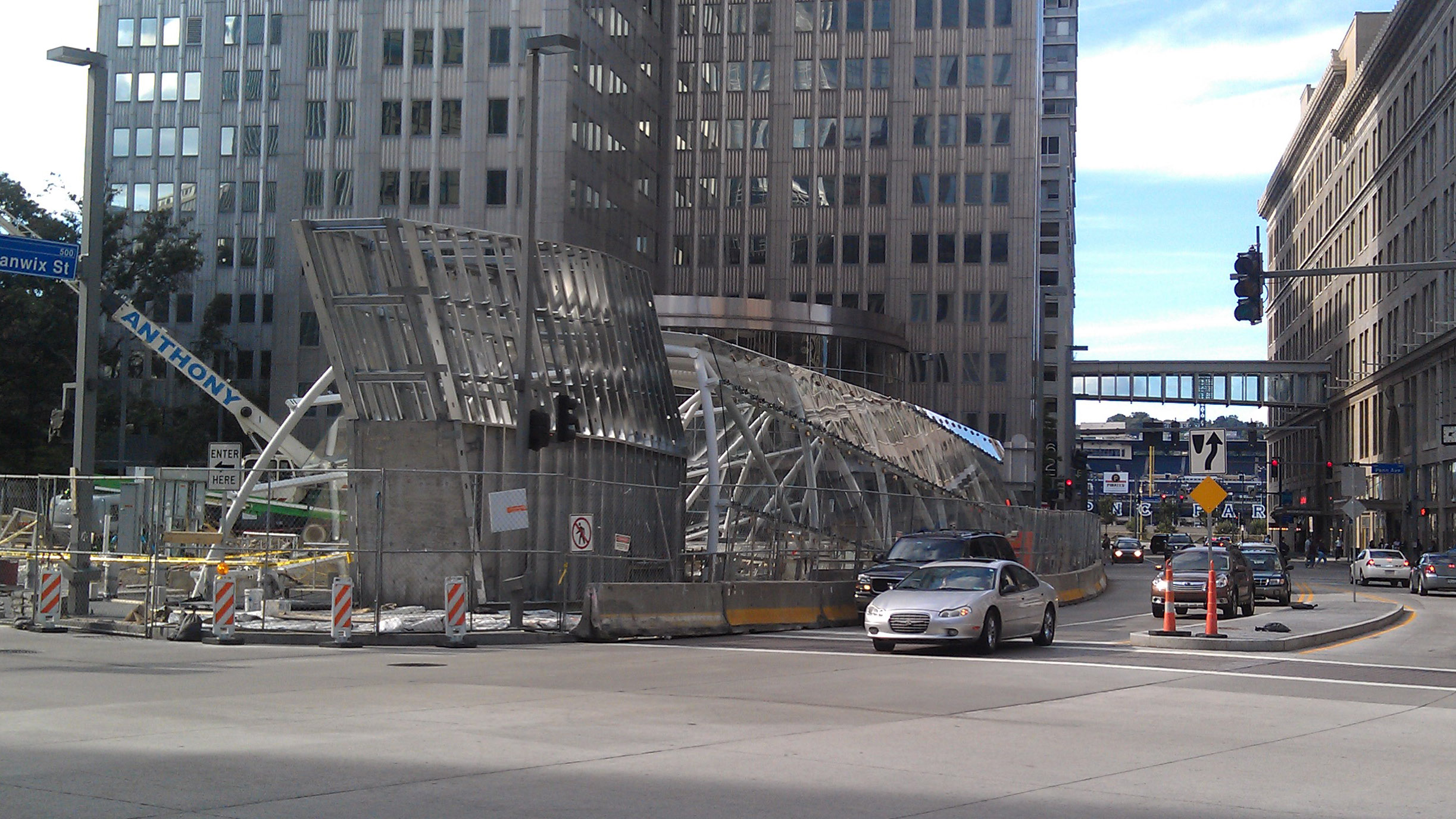
Gateway station construction in August 2011.

The North Shore Connector project attracted considerable controversy on both the local and national level. The points of contention included whether the North Shore Connector was the best way to extend Pittsburgh's light rail network; whether the North Shore Connector would prove to be competitive with existing roads, bridges, and trails in attracting commuters; and whether the project's long-term benefits to the region would justify its cost. Its supporters argued that any enhancement of public transportation infrastructure in the region should be welcome if it decreases regional reliance on automobiles, especially given the uncertainty of future fuel prices and the paucity of parking in downtown, while opponents have argued that the project's small scope and large budget constitute a waste of government spending.

Locally, it was argued that the Pittsburgh Light Rail network probably deserved to be expanded, but that the most logical extension would be an eastward one, not a northward one. The "Spine Line", a proposed eastward extension from downtown to Oakland, was abandoned in part due to its prohibitive projected cost of over $1 billion and its estimated 15-year planning and construction schedule. The North Shore Connector, by comparison, could be built quickly and with a substantially smaller budget. As one local columnist wrote, "People argue the T line should have gone to Oakland first, and they're right...The North Shore Connector is our consolation prize."

On the national level, the project attracted controversy due to its cost and its use of federal funding. The project's original budget was estimated at $350 million, but it increased to $435 million by 2006, and to more than $550 million by 2009, later revised down to $528.8 million in 2010. (The final cost was $523.4 million.) Eighty percent of the funding was provided by the U.S. federal government.

The North Shore Connector was ranked #3 in the nation among stimulus-funded projects purported to waste taxpayer money in a report by Senators John McCain and Tom Coburn. The "Summertime Blues" report, their third in a series, identified 100 projects throughout the country that received money from the $787 billion American Recovery and Reinvestment Act, signed into law in 2009 by President Barack Obama, which the senators classified as wasteful government spending. According to McCain, the Connector was an example of stimulus dollars spent to fund projects with "questionable goals," or those that were "being mismanaged or were poorly planned." Meanwhile, Coburn reminded the media that the initial budget was approximately $390 million, but "quickly ballooned" to a cost of $553 million.

In 2009 then-Governor Ed Rendell, a Democrat, called the tunnel "a tragic mistake" and expressed his wish that the project had never been started. He further stated his belief that the money given to the state from the American Recovery and Reinvestment Act should have been applied to the transportation needs of the state "in a more beneficial fashion". Supporters of the North Shore Connector argued that the stimulus funds provided stability to the local construction industry while enhancing the public transportation infrastructure of the city, and one columnist noted that "[i]f the federal government didn't build [the North Shore Connector] here, it would have built something equally expensive somewhere else."

Indeed, the federal government itself has been criticized heavily for its role in Western Pennsylvania's transportation funding situation; in 2010, it forbade the state's plan for a balanced transportation budget, which would have involved converting Interstate 80 into a toll road. The killed plan would have accounted not only for transit budgets, but also for funding of significant road and bridge infrastructure, which will now face an additional 5,200 Pittsburgh-area cars because of the federally forced transit cuts, according to one analyst.

In 2010, the Pittsburgh Tribune-Review expressed its opposition to the North Shore project, noting that there were already four bridges capable of transporting people from the Downtown area to the city's North Shore and North Side. The Tribune-Review further stated that PNC Park is already accessible to Pittsburgh Pirates fans via the Roberto Clemente Bridge, while the Pittsburgh Steelers have sold out Acrisure Stadium for years without the project's help.

These critiques do not take into account the fact that any northward expansion of Pittsburgh's light rail network would require that the Allegheny river be crossed in some fashion, and the light rail cars could not pass over the existing bridges. The engineers who planned the project concluded that a tunnel, rather than a new or retrofitted bridge, would be the most cost-effective solution to this issue. In addition, in December 2010, the Steelers began examining the possibility of increasing the capacity of Acrisure Stadium by "several thousand" seats. The president of Alco Parking, Merrill Stabile, noted that the North Shore lacks the parking capacity to serve additional fans, and that the North Shore Connector could help alleviate the congestion by "making it easier for fans to park Downtown".

Supporters have argued that the North Shore Connector will not only ease weekend congestion on the North Shore, but will also ease weekday congestion in downtown. On weekdays, commuters will be able to ride the light rail from the North Shore to the downtown by parking in one of the underutilized parking lots or garages of the North Shore. Buses serving the region north of Pittsburgh could make terminal stops at the North Shore light rail stations rather than driving into downtown, further decreasing congestion on the city streets—"a gift to all rush-hour commuters". Better enhancing the North Shore Connector's ability to attract commuters was a three-year deal sponsored by the Pittsburgh Steelers, the Rivers Casino, Alco Parking, and the Pittsburgh Stadium Authority to make rides between the North Shore and downtown completely free.

One positive aspect of the project highlighted by its supporters is that it makes any future northward expansions of the light rail network significantly easier, because the problem of crossing the Allegheny River has already been solved. More generally, the project reflects a regional commitment not to neglect public transportation infrastructure in favor of a purely automobile-based transportation system, with one columnist noting that "[a] light-rail line that stretches from the South Hills to the North Side is going to look much better when gas shoots back over $4 a gallon...Regions that offer residents varied transportation options will be the ones that succeed in this century."
