= Developing Unconventional Gas =

Developing Unconventional Gas or DUG is a series of annual regional conferences of the unconventional oil industry. Several notable key note speakers have visited DUG conferences including Leon Panetta at Pittsburgh's in 2014, T. Boone Pickens in 2011 and George W. Bush in 2013.

Annual Conferences include:

- DUG East - held annually at the David L. Lawrence Convention Center in Pittsburgh.
- DUG Australia - held annually in Brisbane, Australia.
- DUG Eagle Ford - held annually in San Antonio, Texas.
- DUG Midcontinent - held annually in Tulsa.
- DUG Bakken and Niobrara - held annually in Denver.
- DUG Permian - held annually in Fort Worth.
- Executive Oil Conference - held annually in Midland, Texas.
- Crude in Motion Conference - held annually in Houston.
- Marcellus-Utica Midstream Conference - held annually in Pittsburgh.
- Offshore Executive Conference - held annually in Houston.
- Energy Capital Conference - held annually in Houston.
- A&D Strategies and Opportunities Conference - held annually in Dallas.
