= Pennsylvania Intergovernmental Cooperation Authority =

Financial overseer of Pennsylvania

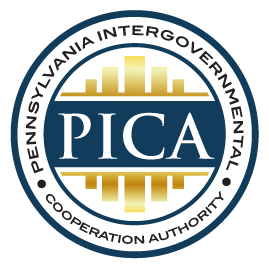

The Pennsylvania Intergovernmental Cooperation Authority, or PICA, is the financial oversight board for the City of Philadelphia.

== History ==
It was created through the 1991 legislation, "Pennsylvania Intergovernmental Cooperation Authority Act for Cities of the First Class," or the PICA Act. PICA was created to provide financial assistance to the City of Philadelphia during a severe financial crisis. At that time, Philadelphia faced a growing operating deficit, mounting overdue bills, and credit ratings which were dropping below investment grade. The City had instituted a municipal hiring freeze and the quality of municipal services was eroding as a result.

PICA was founded to "foster the fiscal integrity of cities of the first class...and provide for proper financial planning procedures and budgeting practices."

== PICA Bonds ==
At its inception, PICA had the power to issue bonds to benefit the City of Philadelphia, an important early role. These bonds were intended to provide funds so the City could avoid insolvency and continue with essential capital investments. Where as the power to issue bonds for these original purposes has expired, PICA remains authorized to issue refunding bonds, the proceeds of which can be granted or loaned to the City. PICA has made available $1.138 billion in direct assistance to the City through debt issuance and capital program earnings. This funding was allocated to deficit elimination and indemnities, capital projects, and retirement of certain high-interest debt. Currently, PICA's bond issuance powers are limited to refinancing existing PICA debt

== Board Composition ==
The PICA Act established the PICA Board as a governing board of five voting members, and two ex-officio non-voting members. Elected State officials (Governor, President Pro Tempore of the Senate, Minority Leader of the Senate, Speaker of the House of Representatives, Minority Leader of the House of Representatives) appoint the voting members of the Board, while the ex-officio members are Philadelphia's Director of Finance and the Budget Secretary of the Commonwealth of Pennsylvania. The current voting Board members are

- Kevin Vaughan, Chair
- Alan C. Kessler, Esquire, Vice Chair
- Michael A. Karp, Secretary/Treasurer
- Rosalind W. Sutch, Assistant Secretary/Treasurer
- Patrick Burns

== Oversight Authority ==
PICA was designed to assist the City of Philadelphia with short-term financing, while overseeing a long-term financial planning process in order to restore the confidence of residents, public officials, and investors in the ability of the City to maintain financial stability. The PICA Act charged the City to exercise efficient and accountable fiscal practices, such as managerial accountability, consolidation and/or elimination of inefficient programs, re-certification of tax-exempt properties, privatization of services, increased collection of City taxes, sale of City assets, improvement of procurement and competitive bidding practices, and review of compensation and benefits for City employees. The legislative intent of the Act was to assure that Philadelphia is prepared to manage not only the financial pressures the City was experiencing at the time of PICA's establishment, but to avoid such situations in the future while safeguarding for their consequences.

Thus, the PICA act provided PICA with certain financial and oversight functions over the City. In this capacity, PICA has the ability to exercise certain advisory and review powers with respect to the City's finances, in addition to its primary function of reviewing and approving annual five-year plans prepared by the City and monitoring the City's compliance with those plans. Should the City fail to adhere to the requirements of the PICA Act and/or become out of compliance with its five-year financial plan, PICA may instruct the Commonwealth of Pennsylvania's Budget Secretary to withhold substantial State financial assistance, as well as the proceeds of the PICA tax (a portion of the City's wage, earnings, and net profits tax that is returned to the City after PICA debt service has been deducted).

== PICA Agreement ==
PICA and the City of Philadelphia entered into an agreement based on the PICA Act, known as the Intergovernmental Cooperation Agreement. It provides PICA with broad access to the City's financial data. The underlying principle of the agreement and the Act was to provide PICA with a wide purview over City financial data so it can conduct independent audits, examinations, or studies of the City's finances in order to facilitate Philadelphia's fiscal integrity.

== Five Year Plan Review ==
The PICA Act requires the development of an annual five year financial plan, to be submitted to Philadelphia City Council and PICA by the Mayor's finance officials. PICA staff reviews the plan and issues a staff report, which contains a recommendation to the Board on whether to approve or reject the plan. The plan is required to include projected revenues and expenditures for the current fiscal year and subsequent five fiscal years. Components of the plan must:

- eliminate any projected deficit for the current fiscal year and subsequent fiscal years
- restore to special funds money from those accounts used for other purposes than specifically authorized
- balance the current fiscal year budget, and budgets for subsequent fiscal years
- provide protections against future fiscal emergencies
- improve the City's ability to gain access to short and long-term credit markets

All projections of revenues and expenditures in the plan are to be based on consistently applied reasonable and appropriate assumptions and estimation methods, and revenues are to be recognized in the accounting period during which they become measurable and available. The plan is also required to include debt service projections, a payment schedule for legally-mandated services due over the life of the plan, and a schedule showing the number of filled and unfilled City employee positions, with estimates of employee wages and benefits costs.

The PICA Act requires PICA staff solicit an opinion on, or certification of, the plan from the City Controller, prepared in accordance with generally accepted auditing standards. The PICA Act does not require the PICA Board to act in accordance with the Controller's opinion.

A qualified majority (four of five voting members) of PICA's Board is needed to approve a five-year plan. Once a plan is approved, the City must stay in compliance with the current plan. If the City comes out of compliance with a currently approved plan, City officials must submit to PICA an explanation, remedial action plan, and supplemental reports until the City comes back into compliance with the plan. Reasons for coming out of compliance with a plan could include extraordinary contracts (contracts not contained in the current plan), collective bargaining agreements, arbitration awards, or other unforeseen variances in revenues or expenditures. Collective bargaining agreements and arbitration awards often require a proposed revision to the current plan. In this event, the City must submit for consideration of the PICA Board a revised plan within a statutorily determined time frame.

== PICA Staff ==
In keeping with fiscal responsibility and efficient government, PICA employs a small staff of four to manage the day-to-day operations of the office, review the City of Philadelphia's five year financial plans, produce various publications and issue papers, and report to the PICA Board. Current staff members include:

- Marisa Waxman, Executive Director
- Rob Call, Deputy Director
- Suzanne Staherski, Research and Policy Analyst
- Deidre Morgenstern, Administrative Manager

== Publications ==
In addition to an annual Staff Report on the City of Philadelphia's five year financial plan, PICA staff also issues a quarterly report on the City's Quarterly City Managers Report (QCMR), and a monthly report on the City's tax revenue collections.

== Issue Papers ==
PICA staff frequently publishes issue papers on financial and performance issues affecting the City of Philadelphia. Currently, PICA staff tracks overtime usage and management across City departments, issuing a quarterly Staff Report on City of Philadelphia Overtime. Recently, PICA has issued a report on the cost of Philadelphia's Deferred Retirement Option Plan (DROP), and staff reports on the City's pension system and departmental performance. Past reports include a report on the Philadelphia Fire Department, and a staff report on the expansion of the Pennsylvania Convention Center.

== See also ==
- Special-purpose district
- Municipal authority (Pennsylvania)
- Pittsburgh Intergovernmental Cooperation Authority
