= Tekko (convention) =

Anime convention in Pittsburgh

Coordinates: 40°26′45″N 79°59′47″W

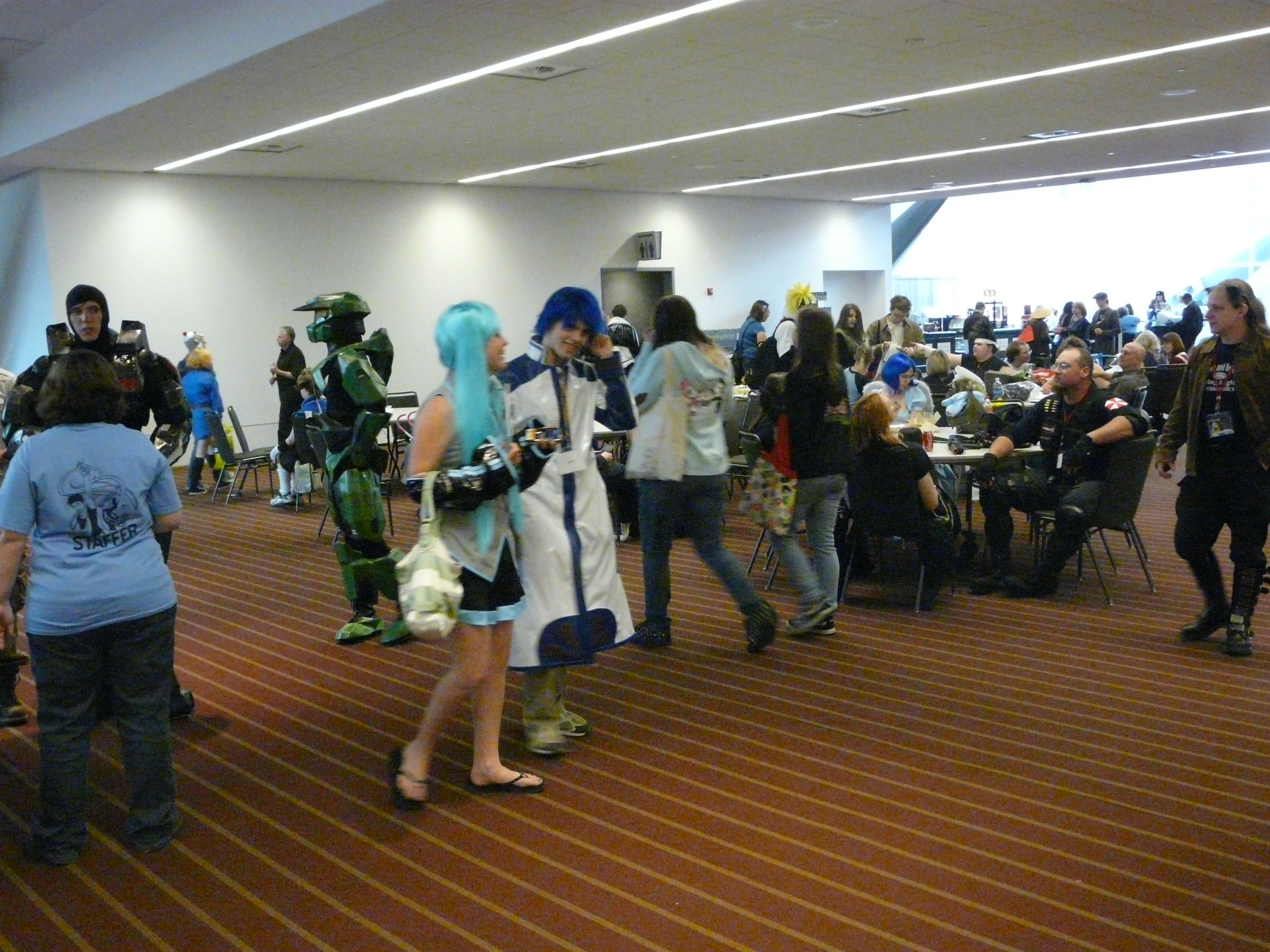
- Tekkoshocon 2010
- Status: Active
- Genre: Anime, manga, Japanese popular culture
- Venue: David L. Lawrence Convention Center
- Location: Pittsburgh, Pennsylvania
- Country: United States
- Inaugurated: 2003
- Attendance: 10,665 in 2024
- Organizer: Pittsburgh Japanese Culture Society (PJCS)
- Website: https://tekko.us

Tekko (formerly Tekkoshocon) is an annual four-day anime convention held during July at the David L. Lawrence Convention Center in Pittsburgh, Pennsylvania. The convention has been held in various locations around the Pittsburgh metropolitan area and is run by a non-profit organization, the Pittsburgh Japanese Culture Society (PJCS). Tekkoshocon's name was a blend of the Japanese word tekkosho, meaning steel mill (a reference to Pittsburgh's industrial steel-producing history), and adapting the suffix "-con" (from convention), which is a common nomenclature archetype among such conventions.

== Programming ==
The convention typically offers an AMV contest, anime viewings, concerts, cosplay masquerade, costume competitions, dance/rave, dance competition, dealers' room, fashion shows, formal ball, gaming (board, LARP, table top, trading card), karaoke room, manga library, panels, video game tournaments, and workshops. Tekko has held charity events since 2006 supporting organizations such as the National Ovarian Cancer Coalition, and in 2011 the Cystic Fibrosis Foundation, Gackt's "Show Your Heart" charity, and Greater Pittsburgh Community Food Bank. The concerts at Tekko have drawn significant attendees, with over 900 for the Rampant concert in 2011, over 1,000 for Exist Trace in 2012, and 1,100 for Dazzle Vision & Cantoy in 2013. Tekko contributed almost three million dollars to the Pittsburgh economy in 2014, growing to nearly four million (3.7 mil) in 2015, and $4.7 million in 2016.

== History ==
In 2002, the first attempt to hold an anime convention in Pittsburgh, Takocon, failed due to a booking problem at the Pittsburgh Marriott City Center and the lack of time to acquire additional space. In 2003, the first Tekkoshocon was organized by Rebecca Roach and occurred at the Wyndham Pittsburgh Airport. In 2004, the convention moved to the Pittsburgh Marriott North and became three days. From 2005 to 2007 Tekkoshocon was held in the Pittsburgh ExpoMart/Radisson Hotel Pittsburgh, but due to unexpected demolition work, Tekkoshocon moved to the Radisson Hotel Pittsburgh Green Tree for 2008.

Tekkoshocon moved to the larger David L. Lawrence Convention Center in 2009 and for 2010 expanded into a four-day convention. In 2011 due to the lack of available space at the David L. Lawrence Convention Center, the convention moved to the Wyndham Grand Pittsburgh Downtown (formerly Pittsburgh Hilton). The convention celebrated its tenth anniversary and remained at the Wyndham Grand for 2012 while adding a fifth evening of events offsite at the Hollywood Theater Dormont. Due to various issues (crowded staircases, hotel issues, noise complaints including an early shutdown Sunday morning), the convention announced that it would not be returning to the Wyndham Grand for 2013. Tekkoshocon Inc. transferred its property to the Pittsburgh Japanese Culture Society, a non-profit organization, in September 2012. The convention returned to the David L. Lawrence Convention Center starting in 2013, with the name shortened to Tekko for 2014.

Tekko added dressing rooms for cosplayers, non photo cosplay locations, Japanese cultural/educational programming (Tekko Gakkou), and expanded the game room by 50 percent in 2015. Pittsburgh declared it to be Tekko Week during the convention in 2016. Two attendees got married during the cosplay masquerade and portions of the convention were streamed live (TeamTekkoTV). In 2017, Tekko expanded its 18+ programming. The convention in 2019 featured a wrestling show by Big Time Wrestling. Tekko 2020 was moved from April to June due to the COVID-19 pandemic, but was later cancelled. Tekko 2021 was moved from July to December due to the COVID-19 pandemic. The convention had both vaccine and mask rules for the December event.

Tekko launched a GoFundMe in June 2022 to raise funds in order to hold the convention. This was due to 2020's cancellation, 2021's poor attendance, and increased costs. The convention needed $60,000 to rent the convention center, with an overall goal of $100,000 to stabilize finances. Tekko held a fundraiser featuring cars and cosplay in early July 2022 and later a steaming funraiser on Twitch. The convention raised over $65,000 by July 7 and received matching donations from Schell Games. Tekko was run by 350 volunteers in 2024.

=== Event history ===
Dates	Location	Atten.	Guests
March 29–30, 2003	Wyndham Pittsburgh Airport; Coraopolis, Pennsylvania	600	Emily DeJesus, Robert DeJesus, Vic Mignogna, Chris Patton, Debora Rabbai, Monica Rial, and Jan Scott-Frazier.
March 12–14, 2004	Pittsburgh Marriott North; Cranberry Township, Pennsylvania		Greg Ayres, Steve Bennett, Bob Bergen, Emily DeJesus, Robert DeJesus, Vic Mignogna, Otaku Duet, and Greg Wicker.
April 8–10, 2005	Pittsburgh ExpoMart; Radisson Hotel Pittsburgh; Monroeville, Pennsylvania	1,400	Greg Ayres, Emily DeJesus, Michael Gluck, Richard "Pocky" Kim, Bruce Lewis, Mike McFarland, Jeff Thompson, and Greg Wicker.
March 31-April 2, 2006	Pittsburgh ExpoMart; Radisson Hotel Pittsburgh; Monroeville, Pennsylvania	1,771	Greg Ayres, Emily DeJesus, Robert DeJesus, Caitlin Glass, Michael Gluck, Tiffany Grant, Matt Greenfield, Hilary Hatch, Kyle Hebert, Michael Poe, and Greg Wicker.
April 13–15, 2007	Pittsburgh ExpoMart; Radisson Hotel Pittsburgh; Monroeville, Pennsylvania	2,457	Greg Ayres, Hilary Hatch, Kyle Hebert, Mari Iijima, Vic Mignogna, Michael Poe, Carrie Savage, Brett Weaver, and Greg Wicker.
April 11–13, 2008	Radisson Hotel Pittsburgh Green Tree; Pittsburgh, Pennsylvania		Robert Axelrod, Greg Ayres, Emily DeJesus, Robert DeJesus, Aaron Dismuke, Sandy Fox, Tiffany Grant, Matt Greenfield, The Hsu-nami, Mari Iijima, Lex Lang, Mike McFarland, and Carrie Savage.
April 3–5, 2009	David L. Lawrence Convention Center; Pittsburgh, Pennsylvania	3,239	Greg Ayres, Battlecake, Johnny Yong Bosch, David Brehm, Eyeshine, Freezepop, Hilary Hatch, Jonathan Klein, Otokage, Michael Poe, Steve Prince, Stephanie Sheh, Uncle Yo, and Stephanie Young.
April 8–11, 2010	David L. Lawrence Convention Center; Pittsburgh, Pennsylvania	3,522	Robert Axelrod, Greg Ayres, Johnny Yong Bosch, Colleen Clinkenbeard, Eyeshine, Barbara Goodson, Todd Haberkorn, Kyle Hebert, Mari Iijima, L33tStr33t Boys, Luzmelt, Vic Mignogna, Wendy Powell, Steve Prince, Carrie Savage, Christopher Corey Smith, Dan Southworth, Suicide Ali, Uncle Yo, and Tommy Yune.
March 31-April 3, 2011	Wyndham Grand Pittsburgh Downtown; Pittsburgh, Pennsylvania	4,000 (est)	Steve Blum, Richard Epcar, lix, Kevin McKeever, Mega Ran, Reni Mimura, Rampant, Ellyn Stern, and Tommy Yune.
March 21–25, 2012	Hollywood Theater Dormont (21st); Wyndham Grand Pittsburgh Downtown; Pittsburgh, Pennsylvania	3,600 (est)	Exist Trace, David J. Fielding, Todd Haberkorn, Kevin McKeever, Mega Ran, SoundWitch, Uncle Yo, and Travis Willingham.
April 4–7, 2013	Hollywood Theater Dormont (4th); David L. Lawrence Convention Center; Pittsburgh, Pennsylvania		Cantoy, Chris Cason, Dazzle Vision, David J. Fielding, Initial P, Tony Oliver, Chii Sakurabi, Uncle Yo, Cristina Vee, and Tommy Yune.
April 4–6, 2014	David L. Lawrence Convention Center; Pittsburgh, Pennsylvania	5,111	Gacharic Spin, Caitlin Glass, Brittney Karbowski, Lolita Dark, Uncle Yo, David Vincent, Greg Wicker, and Lex Winter.
April 16–19, 2015	David L. Lawrence Convention Center; Pittsburgh, Pennsylvania	5,983	Jerry Jewell, Nancy Kepner, Jamie Marchi, RinRin Doll, ROOKiEZ is PUNK'D, J. Michael Tatum, Tune in Tokyo, Uncle Yo, and Lex Winter.
April 7–10, 2016	David L. Lawrence Convention Center; Pittsburgh, Pennsylvania	7,698	Misako Aoki, Back-On, DJ Bass, Nancy Kepner, Lynda Leung, Matthew Mercer, Chris Patton, Marisha Ray, Micah Solusod, Austin Tindle, Uncle Yo, and Lex Winter.
April 6–9, 2017	David L. Lawrence Convention Center; Pittsburgh, Pennsylvania		Haenuli, Nancy Kepner, Cherami Leigh, Magic of Life, n00neimp0rtant, Jeff Nimoy, Brina Palencia, Jad Saxton, Ian Sinclair, Kimura U, Uncle Yo, Greg Wicker, and Lex Winter.
April 5–8, 2018	David L. Lawrence Convention Center; Pittsburgh, Pennsylvania	9,751	SungWon Cho, Luci Christian, Samurai Dan Coglan, Fire Lily, Nancy Kepner, Haruka Kurebayashi, LM.C, Vic Mignogna, Bryce Papenbrook, Monica Rial, Indra Rojas, Jez Roth, Saki Tachibana, and Lex Winter.
April 11–14, 2019	David L. Lawrence Convention Center; Pittsburgh, Pennsylvania	11,385	Justin Briner, Kira Buckland, Ray Chase, Jillian Coglan, Samurai Dan Coglan, Robbie Daymond, Nancy Kepner, Erica Lindbeck, Max Mittelman, Myth & Roid, Shihori Nakane, Jez Roth, Michelle Ruff, Scarfing Scarves, TeddyLoid, and Lex Winter.
December 9–12, 2021	David L. Lawrence Convention Center; Pittsburgh, Pennsylvania	About 4,800	Katelyn Gault, Caitlin Glass, Billy Kametz, Nancy Kepner, James Landino, Erica Lindbeck, Kyle McCarley, Mega Ran, Erica Mendez, Nano, and Sleepyhead.
July 21–24, 2022	David L. Lawrence Convention Center; Pittsburgh, Pennsylvania	8,030	ACME, Jillian Coglan, Samurai Dan Coglan, Haenuli, Nancy Kepner, Cassandra Lee Morris, Nano, Trina Nishimura, Bryce Papenbrook, RinRin Doll, Jez Roth, Alejandro Saab, Jeannie Tirado, VickyBunnyAngel, Sarah Wiedenheft, and Lex Winter.
July 20–23, 2023	David L. Lawrence Convention Center; Pittsburgh, Pennsylvania	9,978	Burnout Syndromes, Jillian Coglan, Samurai Dan Coglan, Khoi Dao, Caleb Hyles, Nancy Kepner, Lady Cels, David Lodge, Brandon McInnis, Kayli Mills, Jez Roth, Keith Silverstein, Laura Stahl, StarsOfCassiopeia, J. Michael Tatum, Lex Winter, Suzie Yeung, and Jonathan Young.
July 18-21, 2024	David L. Lawrence Convention Center; Pittsburgh, Pennsylvania	10,665	6%Dokidoki, Ash Da Hero, Ben Balmaceda, Jessica Calvello, Jillian Coglan, Samurai Dan Coglan, Creep-P, Chris Hackney, Nancy Kepner, Emi Lo, Landon McDonald, Midnight Pursona, PAiDA, Jez Roth, Sarcasm-himé, Karen Strassman, David Vincent, and Lex Winter.
July 17-20, 2025	David L. Lawrence Convention Center; Pittsburgh, Pennsylvania	11,831	Abigail Blythe, Griffin Burns, Creep-P, Jessie James Grelle, Xanthe Huynh, Caleb Hyles, Nancy Kepner, James Landino, Matthew "Maguma" Lewis, Luluko, Alex Organ, Atelier Pierrot, Jez Roth, Megan Shipman, Chris Tergliafera, Uncle Yo, Uptown Cosplay, Natalie Van Sistine, WildSpice, Lex Winter, and Jonathan Young.
July 23-26, 2026	David L. Lawrence Convention Center; Pittsburgh, Pennsylvania		Clover Aura, Amber Lee Connors, Sandy Fox, Brittney Karbowski, Nancy Kepner, Lex Lang, Kristen McGuire, Kayleigh McKee, Matthew David Rudd, Tara Sands, Kaiji Tang, Uncle Yo, Uptown Cosplay, Steff Von Schweetz, Lex Winter, and Anne Yatco.

== Tekko 1/2 ==
Tekko 1/2 was a one-day anime convention created by the staff of Tekkoshocon that included anime showings, cosplay, karaoke, panels, and video games. Due to growth the event moved from the Carnegie Library to the Best Western Parkway Center Inn in 2008.

=== Event history ===
Dates	Location	Atten.	Guests
October 1, 2005	Carnegie Library Main (Oakland); Pittsburgh, Pennsylvania		
October 14, 2006	Carnegie Library Main (Oakland); Pittsburgh, Pennsylvania		Mandy St. Jean
October 27, 2007	Carnegie Library Main (Oakland); Pittsburgh, Pennsylvania		
October 4, 2008	Best Western Parkway Center Inn; Pittsburgh, Pennsylvania		Battlecake, Carrie Savage, and Uncle Yo.

== KuroKiiro Festival ==
The KuroKiiro Festival is an educational anime festival that includes a carnival, dance, dancing maid cafe, swap meet, talent show, vendors, video gaming, and workshops. In 2010, KuroKiiro moved to the Boyd Community Center (former school) in Pittsburgh and formed its own maid cafe group called KuroKiiro Cafe. The event returned to the Boyd Community Center in 2011 and was held over Thanksgiving weekend. KuroKiiro again returned to the Boyd Community Center in 2012 and 2013. For 2014 the convention moved to the California University of Pennsylvania Convocation Center in California, Pennsylvania.

=== Event history ===
Dates	Location	Atten.	Guests
October 3–4, 2009	Best Western Parkway Center Inn; Pittsburgh, Pennsylvania		Battlecake, Dino Lionetti, Carrie Savage, and The SoftReset.
November 5–7, 2010	Boyd Community Center; Pittsburgh, Pennsylvania		Stephanie Nadolny and Uncle Yo.
November 25–27, 2011	Boyd Community Center; Pittsburgh, Pennsylvania		Kent Williams
November 16–18, 2012	Boyd Community Center; Pittsburgh, Pennsylvania		Kyle Hebert
November 1–3, 2013	Boyd Community Center; Pittsburgh, Pennsylvania		Crispin Freeman and Greg Wicker.
August 29–31, 2014	California University of Pennsylvania, Convocation Center; California, Pennsylvania		Leah Clark, Nancy Kepner, Tyson Rinehart, Greg Wicker, and Lex Winter.

== Sangawa Project ==
The Sangawa Project is an 18+ anime event created by the staff of Tekkoshocon geared towards mature fans that includes an AMV contest, arcade, cosplay contest, dealers room, maid cafe, panels, and classic video games. Sangawa's name comes from the Japanese word for "three rivers", in reference to Pittsburgh's nickname. The event acts as a revenue source, along with the KuroKiiro Festival, for Tekkoshocon. For 2014 the convention moved to the DoubleTree by Hilton Hotel Pittsburgh in Pittsburgh, Pennsylvania. The convention by 2025 had moved to the Downtown DoubleTree by Hilton and expanded to three floors.

=== Event history ===
Dates	Location	Atten.	Guests
December 4–5, 2010	Best Western Parkway Center Inn; Pittsburgh, Pennsylvania	106	Dan Woren
July 15–17, 2011	Best Western Parkway Center Inn; Pittsburgh, Pennsylvania		Matt K. Miller
July 13–15, 2012	Best Western Parkway Center Inn; Pittsburgh, Pennsylvania		Kevin McKeever and Jeff Ryan.
December 5–7, 2014	DoubleTree by Hilton Hotel Pittsburgh; Pittsburgh, Pennsylvania	300+	Monica Rial
December 4–6, 2015	DoubleTree by Hilton Hotel Pittsburgh - Green Tree; Pittsburgh, Pennsylvania		Nancy Kepner, Vic Mignogna Sonny Strait, and Lex Winter.
December 9–11, 2016	DoubleTree by Hilton Hotel Pittsburgh - Green Tree; Pittsburgh, Pennsylvania		Todd Haberkorn, Nancy Kepner, and Lex Winter.
December 8–10, 2017	DoubleTree by Hilton Hotel Pittsburgh - Green Tree; Pittsburgh, Pennsylvania		Colleen Clinkenbeard, Nancy Kepner, Robert McCollum, and Lex Winter.
November 30 - December 2, 2018	Drury Plaza Hotel Pittsburgh Downtown; Pittsburgh, Pennsylvania		Samurai Dan Coglan, Nancy Kepner, Tony Oliver, David Vincent, and Lex Winter.
December 6–8, 2019	Drury Plaza Hotel Pittsburgh Downtown; Pittsburgh, Pennsylvania		Jamie Marchi and Monica Rial.
February 9-11, 2024	DoubleTree by Hilton Hotel & Suites Pittsburgh Downtown; Pittsburgh, Pennsylvania		Chris Hackney, Nancy Kepner, and Lex Winter.
February 7-9, 2025	DoubleTree by Hilton Hotel & Suites Pittsburgh Downtown; Pittsburgh, Pennsylvania		Brittany Lauda, Matt Shipman, Nancy Kepner, and Lex Winter.
February 6-8, 2026	DoubleTree by Hilton Hotel & Suites Pittsburgh Downtown; Pittsburgh, Pennsylvania		Brian Beacock, Nancy Kepner, and Lex Winter.

== See also ==
- List of anime conventions
