= Quango =

Type of public authority

A quango (quasi-autonomous non-governmental organization; also QUANGO) is a corporation, authority or other organisation, formed outside of government-proper, to which a government has devolved power over certain public functions; the organisation has some independence but it is still partly or ultimately controlled or financed by ministers or other government officers. The acronym was originally derived from quasi-NGO, where NGO is the abbreviation for a non-government organization, the quasi thus qualifying the 'non'. Subsequently, the term acquired the additional "-autonomous" to emphasise the partial separation and semi-independence of the typical quango from its creating government.

The substitution into the name of near (in place of non), to yield quasi-autonomous near-government organisation (also abbreviated QUANGO), is perhaps the most accurate and most descriptive nomenclature, capturing the proximity to the public sector—and the 'almost'-governmental nature—of such bodies.

As all versions of the name suggest, quangos are hybrid organizations, with elements of their structure, organisation and governance taken from both NGOs, on the one hand, and regular or mainstream public sector bodies on the other. Although originating in the United States, the term is primarily used today in the United Kingdom—as well as, to a lesser degree, other countries in the core and middle Anglosphere.

In the UK, quango is not an official term — it has been described as pejorative and "highly emotive", with some using it disparagingly to criticise duplicative and wasteful bureaucracy, politicians' avoidance of difficult decision-making, and reductions in democratic accountability. It nevertheless covers various British arm's-length bodies (ALBs) (the official term), including non-departmental public bodies ("semi-autonomous public bodies") (NDPBs), non-ministerial government departments, and executive agencies.

== Use ==
=== Canada ===
In Canada, quangos are referred to as Crown corporations or simply Crown corps. As of May 2021, there were 45 Crown corps owned by the Canadian federal government, however many more are owned by each of the provincial governments. Notable are electricity providers such as the Saskatchewan Power Corporation (SaskPower) owned by the province of Saskatchewan and 'Manitoba Hydro-Electric Board' a.k.a. Manitoba Hydro owned by the province of Manitoba.

==== Saskatchewan ====
Saskatchewan is notable for the ubiquity of provincial crown corps with most styled with the prefix Sask- followed by the primary service. The larger Saskatchewan Crown corps have their own Saskatchewan minister with all Saskatchewan Crown corps owned by the Crown Investment Corporation of Saskatchewan which in turn is owned by the provincial government. Some of the most notable Saskatchewan Crown corps are as follows:

- SaskTel (Saskatchewan Telecommunications Holding Corporation) providing telecommunications. Notable for being the last remaining government-owned incumbent telephone provider in Canada.
- SaskPower (Saskatchewan Power Corporation) provides electricity.
- SaskEnergy (SaskEnergy Incorporated) provides natural gas.
- SaskWater (Saskatchewan Water Corporation) providing potable water and sewage services to certain communities.

=== Ireland ===
In 2006, there were 832 quangos in the Republic of Ireland – 482 at national and 350 at local level – with a total of 5,784 individual appointees and a combined annual budget of €13 billion.

The Irish majority party, Fine Gael, had promised to eliminate 145 quangos should they be the governing party in the 2016 election. Since coming to power they have reduced the overall number of quangos by 17. This reduction also included agencies which the former government had already planned to remove.

=== New Zealand ===
In New Zealand, quangos are referred to as 'Crown Entities', with the shift occurring in the 1980s during a period of neoliberalisation of the state sector. In 1996, there were an estimated 310 quangos in New Zealand, and an additional 2690 school Boards of Trustees (similar to the American model of boards of education). Other quangos from 1996 include: "...63 Crown Health Enterprises, 39 tertiary education institutions, 21 Business development boards and 9 Crown Research Institutes. But there were also 71 single crown entities with services ranging from regulatory (e.g. Accounting Standards Review Board, Takeovers Panel) to quasi-judicial (e.g. Police Complaints Authority, Race Relations Conciliator), to the arts (e.g. New Zealand Symphony Orchestra, NZ Film Commission), to social welfare (e.g. Housing Corporation of NZ) and to substantial enterprises (e.g. Auckland International Airport Ltd)."

By 2003, the number of quangos had increased to an estimated 400 (excluding Board of Trustees), with more than 3,000 people sitting on governance boards that were appointed by successive governments. This appointment of people to governance boards has been widely criticised by political parties and political commentators as a form of cronyism.

In 2010, there were 2,607 crown entities (including Board of Trustees) with annual expenditure of $32 billion in 2009/2010.

=== United Kingdom ===
Despite a 1979 commitment from the Conservative Party to curb the growth of non-departmental bodies, their numbers grew rapidly throughout that party's time in power during the 1980s. One UK example is the Forestry Commission, which is a non-ministerial government department responsible for forestry in England.

The Cabinet Office 2009 report on non-departmental public bodies found that there were 766 NDPBs sponsored by the UK government. The number had been falling: there were 827 in 2007 and 790 in 2008. The number of NDPBs had fallen by over 10% since 1997. Staffing and expenditure of NDPBs had increased. They employed 111,000 people in 2009 and spent £46.5 billion, of which £38.4 billion was directly funded by the government.

According to an analysis done by the Cabinet Office, there were 302 ALBs (or quangos) in the UK in 2022/23, 244 of which were non-departmental public bodies. ALBs employed just over 390,800 staff. By far the biggest ALB was NHS England, receiving over a third of the total funding for all ALBs. NHS England is currently being dissolved, with most of its functions and employees due to be absorbed into the Department for Health and Social Care.

=== United States ===
Use of the term quango is less common in the United States, although many US bodies, including government-sponsored enterprises, operate in the same fashion. Paul Krugman has stated that the US Federal Reserve is, effectively, "what the British call a quango... Its complex structure divides power between the federal government and the private banks that are its members, and in effect gives substantial autonomy to a governing board of long-term appointees."

Other U.S.-based organizations that fit the original definition of quangos include the National Center for Missing and Exploited Children (NCMEC), the National Endowment for Democracy, the Federal National Mortgage Association (Fannie Mae) and the Federal Home Loan Mortgage Corporation (Freddie Mac).

By the broader definition now used in the United Kingdom, there are hundreds of federal agencies that might be classed as quangos.

=== Indonesia ===
The Indonesian Ulema Council is considered a quango for its status as an independent, mass organization-like public organization but supported and financed by the state while keeping its status as independent organization outside the Indonesian state organizational system in other side. As a quango, MUI is empowered to issue religious edicts (fatwas) comparable to state laws which are binding upon the Indonesian Muslim population and can exert influence upon state policies, politics, and the economy due to its status and prestige.

== History and etymology ==
The term "quasi non-governmental organization" was created in 1967 by Alan Pifer of the US-based Carnegie Foundation, in an essay on the independence and accountability of public-funded bodies that are incorporated in the private sector. This essay got the attention of David Howell, a Conservative MP in Britain, who then organized an Anglo-American project with Pifer, to examine the pros and cons of such enterprises. The lengthy term was shortened to the acronym QUANGO (later also the lowercase quango has been used) by Anthony Barker, a British participant in one of the project's conferences.

It describes an ostensibly non-governmental organization performing governmental functions, often in receipt of funding or other support from government. (By contrast, charities and other traditional NGOs mostly obtain revenues from donations from the public, foundations and other organizations which support their cause.)

An essential feature of a quango in the original definition was that it should not be a formal part of the state structure. The term was then extended to apply to a range of organisations, such as executive agencies providing (from 1988) health, education and other services. Particularly in the UK, this occurred in a polemical atmosphere in which it was alleged that proliferation of such bodies was undesirable and should be reversed. In this context, the original acronym was often replaced by a backronym spelt out as "quasi-autonomous national government organisation, and often rendered as 'qango' This spawned the related acronym qualgo, a 'quasi-autonomous local government organisation'.

The less contentious term non-departmental public body (NDPB) is often employed to identify numerous organisations with devolved governmental responsibilities. Examples in the United Kingdom include those engaged in the regulation of various commercial and service sectors, such as the Water Services Regulation Authority.

The UK government's definition in 1997 of a non-departmental public body or quango was:

A body which has a role in the processes of national government, but is not a government department or part of one, and which accordingly operates to a greater or lesser extent at arm's length from Ministers.

== Criticisms ==
The Times has accused quangos of bureaucratic waste and excess. In 2005, Dan Lewis, author of The Essential Guide to Quangos, claimed that the UK had 529 quangos, many of which were useless and duplicated the work of others.

The term has spawned the derivative quangocrat; the Taxpayers' Alliance faulted a majority of "quangocrats" for not making declarations of political activity.

== See also ==
- Penelope Lyttelton, Viscountess Cobham – nicknamed the "Quango Queen"
- Political accountability
- Departments of the United Kingdom Government
- Freedom of information
- Government-organized non-governmental organization (GONGO)
- Government agency
- Independent agency
- New York state public-benefit corporations
- Off-budget enterprise
- Scottish public bodies
- Welsh Government sponsored body
- Non-departmental public body
