= Allegheny County Sanitary Authority =

Agency overview
- Formed: 1946
- Jurisdiction: Greater Pittsburgh Metropolitan Area
- Headquarters: 3300 Preble Ave Pittsburgh, PA 15233
- Employees: 2,500
- Agency executive: Arletta Scott Williams, Executive Director
- Website: alcosan.org

Allegheny County Sanitary Authority (also known as ALCOSAN) is a municipal authority in Allegheny County, Pennsylvania that provides wastewater treatment services to 83 communities, including the city of Pittsburgh. Its principal sewage treatment plant is along the Ohio River downstream from Pittsburgh (see satellite photo). (map of service area)

== Pittsburgh's early water practices ==
In Pittsburgh's early history, the Allegheny and Monongahela rivers were used as both drinking water sources and as sewers. While the rich often drank bottled water, the poor used primarily unfiltered river water. Pittsburgh at one time had the highest rate of typhoid in the country; in the late 19th century, about half of all foreign-born men became sick with typhoid within two years of arriving in the city. Typhoid death rates dropped from about 130 per 100,000 population to about 30 per 100,000 after filtration of the water supply began in 1907.

As the city's population grew, its early haphazard collection of cesspools and privy vaults (outhouses) was replaced with a municipal combined sewer system that routed sewage into the area's tributaries and rivers, starting around 1880. This improved many neighborhoods, but it deflected the problem into the rivers. Although the Pennsylvania Pure Waters Act of 1905 banned the discharge of untreated sewage by any new municipal system, that practice continued in Pittsburgh. Public health experts advocated for sewage treatment in the early 20th century, but this was regarded as an unaffordable luxury by most. Disease rates had dropped in the meantime, typhoid deaths being reduced to under 1 case per 100,000 by the 1930s. The prevailing attitude was that rivers were created in order to carry waste to the sea, and that rather than require Pittsburgh to treat its wastewater, communities downriver should treat their water supplies.

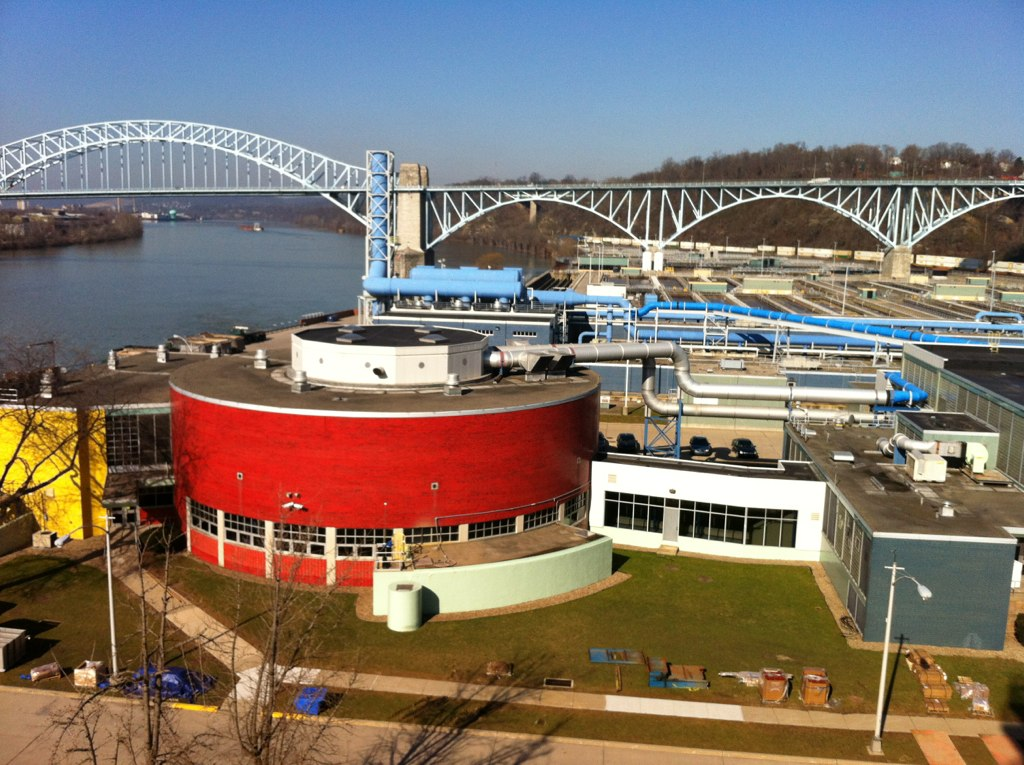
ALCOSAN plant, on the Ohio River next to the McKees Rocks Bridge

Buoyed by rising sanitation standards and a push to clean up Pittsburgh after World War II, the Pennsylvania Sanitary Water Board ordered Pittsburgh and surrounding communities to end these practices. So Allegheny County founded the Allegheny County Sanitary Authority, or ALCOSAN, in the 1940s. Financing the system was a major hurdle involving squabbles between Pittsburgh and surrounding communities. This hurdle was cleared when ALCOSAN secured a four-year loan of $100 million, the largest for sewage treatment in American history, in 1955. The routine dumping of raw sewage into area rivers ceased in 1959, when ALCOSAN began operations.

== Present practices ==
By the first decade of the 21st century, Pittsburgh's rivers were far cleaner than they had been 100 or 50 years earlier. Some people fish and waterski in the rivers. But the water quality has not kept pace with improving federal standards. Indeed, Pittsburgh has more combined sewer outfalls than any other city in the United States.

Since 2004, ALCOSAN has held an annual open house, typically the third Saturday in September, to educate the public and inform them about the likely changes in coming years.

ALCOSAN hires lobbyists to make their case with state government. In 2009, ALCOSAN paid $73,000 to Buchanan, Ingersoll & Rooney and $48,000 to Eckert, Seamans, Cherin & Mellott to lobby the Pennsylvania General Assembly.

== Pittsburgh's sewer overflow problem ==
Like those in many old cities, Pittsburgh's sewer and storm water pipes are antiquated. Some lines are 50 to 100 years old and made of brick. And the sewer and storm drain systems grew in a haphazard fashion during Pittsburgh's rapid population growth around the year 1900. That has led to pollution problems. Portions of ALCOSAN's service area use segregated sewer and storm runoff plumbing systems, where the sewage is piped to ALCOSAN's sewage treatment plant, while the storm water flows directly into area tributaries. Other portions of the area use more primitive combined sewers, where sewage and storm water are mixed and flow through the same pipe to ALCOSAN's plant. After heavy rainfall, however, combined sewers commonly dump untreated sewage into area rivers and tributaries without treatment, in an event called a combined sewer overflow. Because of mis-connections and leaks in the plumbing system, even supposedly segregated systems will sometimes overflow during storms, releasing additional untreated sewage into the rivers. Such an event is called a sanitary sewer overflow. In 2004, the EPA estimated that 16 billion US gallons (61,000,000 m^{3}) of raw sewage were discharged annually from outfalls into Pittsburgh area waterways. As of 2009, there are about 70 days a year when contact with river water in the Pittsburgh area is not recommended due to combined or sanitary sewer overflows.

Some of the smaller tributaries are even more polluted than the large rivers. In a 2005 study, a Carnegie Mellon University project tested water quality and found that only 32 percent of Allegheny County's streams meet Pennsylvania's safety standard for fecal coliform bacteria. Crooked Run in North Versailles, for example, contained 2,000 times the standard. The study was the first large scale measurement of water quality in area tributaries in years. The state's Department of Environmental Protection no longer takes measurements like these because, spokesperson Betsy Mallison says, "we already know there's sewage there, and we're dealing with it."

After decades of such pollution in violation of the United States Environmental Protection Agency's Clean Water Act, in 2007 ALCOSAN signed a consent decree with the EPA and the Pennsylvania Department of Environmental Protection to develop a plan to greatly reduce its sewage overflows. ALCOSAN must assemble the plan by 2012 and implement it by 2026.

== Sewer overflow advisories ==
River water advisories warn the general public of possible river contamination and caution them to limit contact with river water when boating, fishing, water skiing or engaging in other river recreational activities. An advisory does not prohibit nor discourage river recreational activities. It is intended to inform the general public when river water may be contaminated so they can take precautions to minimize water contact during their outings. These precautions are particularly aimed at people who have open cuts or sores, and those with weakened immune systems who are most vulnerable to infection from exposure to contaminated river water.

Advisories are issued during the summer months when river recreation season is at its peak. That season typically lasts from May 15 through September 30 when the likelihood of exposure to river contamination due to sewer overflows and storm water runoff increases. Local marinas and other sites along the river fly orange-colored CSO (Combined Sewer Overflow) alert flags indicating when an advisory is in effect.

Sewers overflow during a significant rainfall because the combined sewer systems fill up beyond their capacity to carry both sewage and storm water, thereby discharging the excess flow into rivers and streams. Since streams also are affected, people should limit stream contact as well. Runoffs and overflows subside gradually and river water quality usually does not return to normal until 24 to 36 hours after the rainfall ends.

River water advisories were instituted in 1995 to comply with federal regulations requiring public notice when overflows and runoffs increase the likelihood of river contamination. The frequency and duration may vary depending on the amount of rainfall. For example, in the "dry" summer of 1999, eleven advisories were issued lasting a total of 33 days (an average of three days each). In 1998, ten advisories were issued lasting a total of 50 days (an average of five days each).

In addition to the CSO flag program, ALCOSAN maintains the online Sewer Overflow Advisory Key (SOAK) that "grades" current water quality by a visual color key, indicating conditions in terms of appropriate recreational uses and stores a history of water quality alerts online. SOAK status is updated in real-time using the following key:

Green: System is in dry weather operation; Use rivers, streams and creeks with care

Red: Wet weather overflows are in effect; Minimize contact with rivers, streams and creeks

Yellow: Wet weather overflows have ceased; Rivers, streams and creeks may still be impaired.

SOAK status generally reverts from yellow to green 48 hours after wet weather overflows have ceased. The SOAK program is also active during the recreational boating season, May 15 through September 30.

== Past estimates of cost increases ==
In 2007, ALCOSAN estimated that conformance with the consent decree will cost $1 billion. In a 2009 review of ALCOSAN, the controllers of Allegheny County and the city of Pittsburgh announced their estimate of consent decree costs through 2026 at $21 billion—much higher than the ALCOSAN estimate—and "without external funding, this could pose an annual increase of between $425 and $3,104 per home". Some of their projections of the cost ranged as high as $50 billion. As of 2007, ALCOSAN was charging its residential customers $2.98 per 1,000 US gallons (3,800 L) of water. By 2009, it had risen to $3.77 per 1,000 US gallons (3,800 L).

== Wet weather plan ==
As of 2012, the average ALCOSAN bill is $262 per household per year. Customers also must pay a municipal bill, bringing the average total sewage bill (ALCOSAN plus municipal) for a customer in the ALCOSAN region to $430 per household per year.

On July 31, 2012, ALCOSAN released a draft Wet Weather Plan to satisfy the EPA's consent decree which called for elimination of all Sanitary Sewer Overflows (SSOs) and reduction of Combined Sewer Overflows (CSOs) by 85% by the end of 2026.

This document described a Selected Plan which meets and exceeds these requirements, at a cost of $3.6 billion total in 2010 dollars (it would eliminate SSOs and capture 96% of CSOs), and entails the construction of 25 miles of new tunnel. ALCOSAN argues that this Selected Plan is too expensive for customers, however, since it would approximately triple their total sewage bill.

Consequently, ALCOSAN proposed a Recommended Plan that is affordable, with a total cost of $2 billion in 2010 dollars, but that falls short of the EPA consent decree requirements, as it reduces SSOs by only 90% and CSOs by only 79%. The estimate is that ALCOSAN's portion of customers' sewage bills would rise by about 11% per year, resulting in a total sewage bill approximately double the current bill. ALCOSAN will ask the EPA for a relaxation of the consent decree requirements in conformance with this plan. But in the Mid-Atlantic region, the EPA has never renegotiated a consent agreement to remedy sewage overflows on the basis of affordability for ratepayers.

While environmentalists criticized the plan because of components that include 15' diameter pipes to help handle peak storm water load, ALCOSAN in early 2017 announced a generous grant program to help municipalities employ green techniques, stream removal and other means.

ALCOSAN is in negotiations with the EPA on an updated plan.

== Consent decree construction ==
In 2009, ALCOSAN announced plans for demonstration projects in Munhall and Millvale for treatment of combined sewers along some of the tributaries in its area. The demonstration project was not built.

== See also ==
- Allegheny River
- Monongahela River
- Ohio River
