= Robert E. England =

American political scientist

Robert E. England is an American political scientist. He is an emeritus professor in the Department of Political Science at Oklahoma State University. He is a former graduate student of David R. Morgan. England is the founding editor of International Fire Service Journal of Leadership and Management and an Editorial Board member for the Journal of Social Change.

== Education ==
England earned his undergraduate degree from the University of Science and Arts of Oklahoma in 1974. He earned a Ph.D. in political science at the University of Oklahoma, graduating in 1982.

== Career and scholarship ==
England began his career as an Assistant Professor of Political Science at Oklahoma State University in 1982. In 1990, he reached the rank of full professor, and in 1997, he became head of the department. His scholarly work includes coauthorship of Race, Class, and Education: The Politics of Second Generation Discrimination, Oklahoma Politics & Policies: Governing the Sooner State, and Managing Urban America.

England was the co-founder of the Master's of Science in Fire and Emergency Management Administration at OSU, and he is founding editor of the International Fire Service Journal of Leadership and Management.

== Honors and awards ==
- 1987–88 OSU Fred Jones Award for Teaching Excellence
- 1992 Oklahoma Center for the Book: Outstanding Nonfiction Book Award, for the book Oklahoma Politics & Policies: Governing the Sooner State (with David Morgan and George Humphreys), University of Nebraska Press, 1991, ISBN 0-8032-8136-6
- 1996 Phi Eta Sigma OSU freshman honor society outstanding teaching award.
- 1997 Outstanding Oklahoma Political Scientist, Oklahoma Political Science Association.
- 1998 Outstanding Teaching Award, American Political Science Association and Pi Sigma Alpha.
- 2011 University of Science and Arts of Oklahoma Hall of Fame
