= David R. Morgan =

American political scientist

David R. Morgan is a retired professor of political science at the University of Oklahoma where he was the Henry Bellmon Chair of Public Service.

Morgan served two years as the first city manager of Yukon, Oklahoma.

In 2004 he received the Distinguished Service Award from the Southwestern Social Science Association.

== Writings by David R. Morgan ==
- Managing Urban America with Robert E. England (1999)
- Oklahoma Politics and Policies with Robert E. England, George Humphreys (1992), ISBN 0-8032-8136-6
