= David L. Lawrence Convention Center =

Convention center in Pittsburgh, Pennsylvania, United States

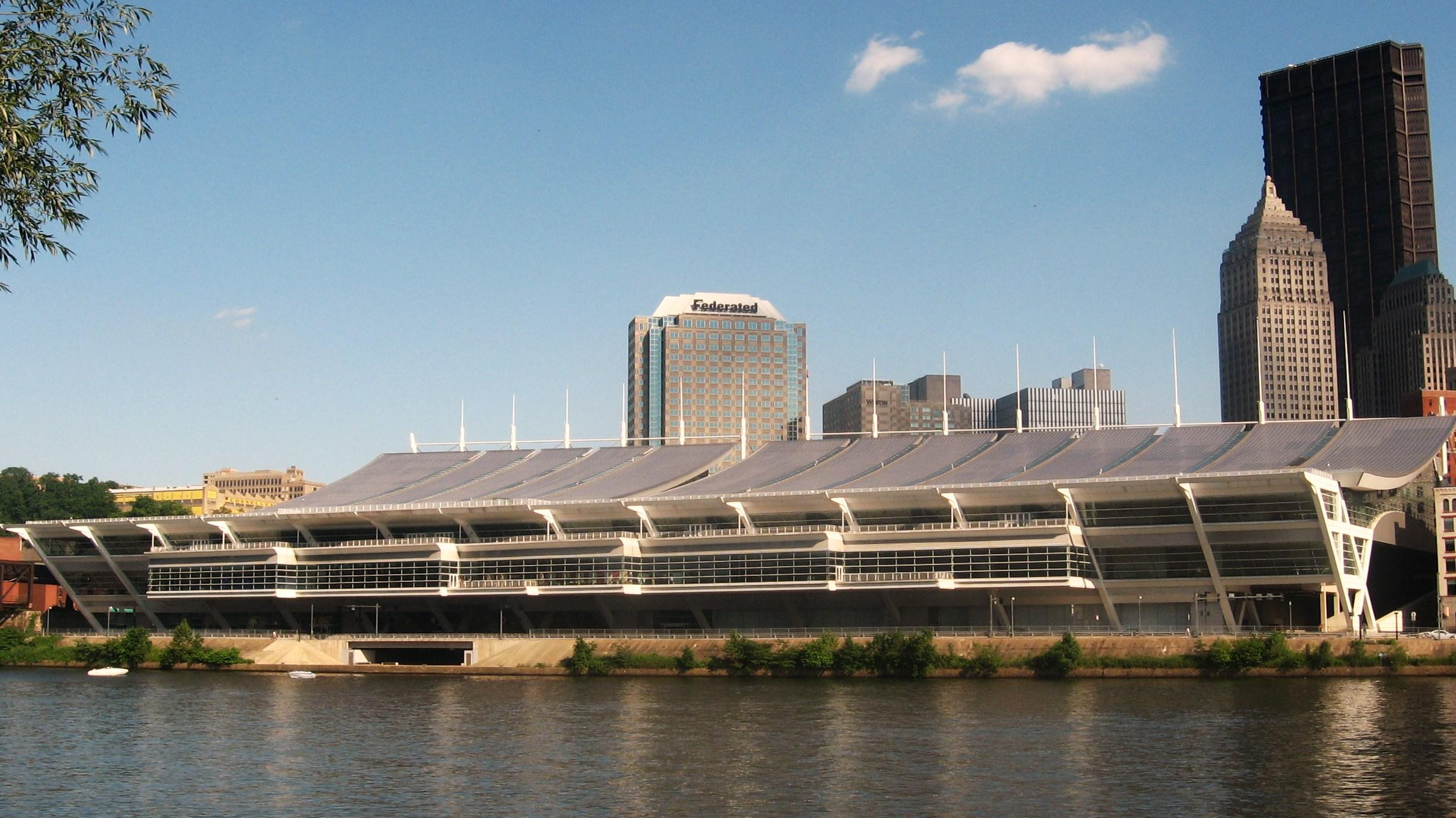
- David L. Lawrence Convention Center in Pittsburgh
- Interactive map of David L. Lawrence Convention Center
- Address: 1000 Ft. Duquesne Blvd., Pittsburgh, PA 15222
- Location: Downtown Pittsburgh
- Coordinates: 40°26′45″N 79°59′47″W
- Owner: Sports & Exhibition Authority of Pittsburgh and Allegheny County
- Public transit: Wood Street

Construction
- Built: 1979–1981
- Opened: February 7, 1981
- Renovated: 2000–2003
- Expanded: 2000–2003
- Cost: $373 million ($668 million today)

Website
- www.pittsburghcc.com

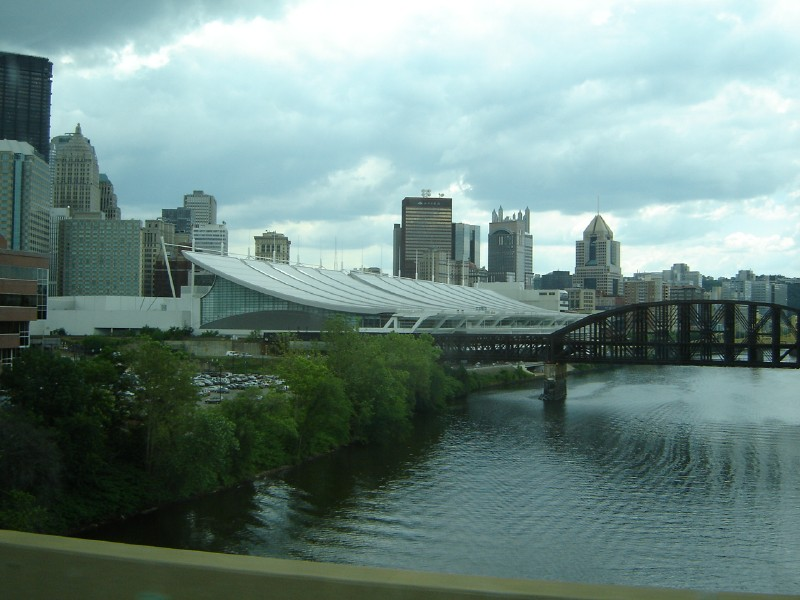
The exhibit halls, seen from the Veterans Bridge.

The David L. Lawrence Convention Center (DLCC or DLLCC) is a 1,500,000-square-foot (140,000 m^{2}) convention, conference and exhibition building in downtown Pittsburgh in the U.S. commonwealth of Pennsylvania. It is served by two exits on Interstate 579. The initial David L. Lawrence Convention Center was completed on the site on February 7, 1981, but as part of a renewal plan the new, completely redesigned center was opened in 2003 and funded in conjunction with nearby Acrisure Stadium and PNC Park. It sits on the southern shoreline of the Allegheny River. It is the first LEED-certified convention center in North America and one of the first in the world. It is owned by the Sports & Exhibition Authority of Pittsburgh and Allegheny County.

== History ==
In the early 1970s a site on the opposite side of downtown Pittsburgh was considered for a modern convention center, on the shores of the Monongahela River. On September 20, 1971, the Commonwealth of Pennsylvania failed to approve that location, and site work slowly began on the present site as the city and county submitted it to the commonwealth on December 10, 1974. There was a proposal in mid-1974 to locate the center at the then transitioning Penn Station. The center had its ceremonial groundbreaking on June 8, 1977.

On February 7, 1981, the original $35 million ($137 million today) structure opened with a ribbon cutting ceremony by Mayor Richard Caliguiri, County Commissioner Tom Foerster and Governor Dick Thornburgh. The old convention center was 131,000 sq ft (12,000 m^{2}) and lacked a ballroom.

The 1981 building was demolished to make way for the current structure, built on the same site. After the Commonwealth approved funding for the redesigned center on February 3, 1999 Rafael Viñoly Architects, P.C. was chosen as the designer for the modern center on February 28, 1999. Viñoly along with Dewhurst MacFarlane & Partners and Goldreich Engineering P.C. constructed the $354 million ($684.2 million today) riverfront landmark to contain 313,400 sq ft (29,100 m^{2}) of exhibit space (236,900 sq ft (22,000 m^{2}) of which is column-free), 76,500 sq ft (7,100 m^{2}) of additional exhibit space, a 31,610 sq ft (2,940 m^{2}) ballroom, 51 meeting rooms, two 250-seat lecture halls, teleconference and telecommunications capabilities and 4,500 sq ft (420 m^{2}) of retail space (currently in development). The architect, Viñoly, began the design with a goal in mind of achieving the status of a "green" building. In 2003, the building was awarded Gold Leadership in Energy and Environmental Design (LEED) certification by the U.S. Green Building Council, making it the first such convention center in the U.S. and the largest "green" building in the world.

The newly rebuilt building won the 2004 Supreme Award for structural engineering excellence from the Institution of Structural Engineers.

The convention center is home to prominent conventions, such as Anthrocon, the Pittsburgh RV Show, Pittsburgh Boat Show, Pittsburgh Home and Garden Show, Piratefest, and the acclaimed Pittsburgh International Auto Show.

== Naming ==
The center—though completely a structure of 2003 construction—chose to retain the name of the earlier convention center on the site completed in 1981 in honor of David Leo Lawrence (June 18, 1889 – November 21, 1966). Lawrence was an American politician who served as the Democratic Governor of Pennsylvania from 1959 to 1963, only retiring because of the state's then term limit of one per governor. He is to date the only mayor of Pittsburgh to be elected Governor of Pennsylvania. Previously, he had been the longest tenured mayor of Pittsburgh (1946–1959) and the primary force behind Pittsburgh's urban renewal projects including the Mellon Arena, Gateway Center, Fort Pitt Tunnel and Point State Park. He was Pennsylvania's first Catholic Governor (at the time a major breakthrough for an Irish Catholic), and a major force in the national Democratic Party from the 1930s to the 1960s. Historians credit him with among other behind-the-scenes labors, including leading a compromise at the 1944 National Democratic Convention that made Harry Truman vice president and hence eventually President. He also later also helped to heal the divided national convention of 1960 that resulted in the John F. Kennedy/Lyndon B. Johnson ticket; it is for these reasons as well as his work in the state and the city that he was dubbed "kingmaker" by media and party leaders.

== Incidents ==
On February 13, 1982, a 130-pound cougar named Tom Tom mauled a 9-year-old Upper St. Clair boy at an auto show before an off-duty Pittsburgh Police officer shot the animal dead. The cougar was part of a display advertising the Mercury Cougar. The boy survived after being treated at Allegheny General Hospital for several days.

On February 12, 2002, less than two weeks before the scheduled opening of the new center, a 165-ton truss that was under construction collapsed, killing one and injuring two workers. The truss was part of the second phase of construction, scheduled for opening in 2003, and did not delay the February 23 opening of phase one.

On February 5, 2007, a section of concrete floor from the second floor loading dock collapsed under the weight of a tractor-trailer and fell onto the water feature area below. There were no injuries. The building remained closed until investigations by the contractors were completed on March 9, the fault was repaired, and the convention center reopened.

== Notable events ==
=== 1970s ===
- June 8, 1977: Groundbreaking at 10th Street and Ft. Duquesne Way.

=== 1980s ===
- February 7, 1981: Ribbon-cutting ceremony by Mayor Richard Caliguiri, County Commissioner Tom Foerster and Gov. Dick Thornburgh as the nine-day Premier Expo kicks off free to the public, with exhibits from the consulates of China, France, Italy, Spain, Greece, the Netherlands and the United Kingdom. HJ Heinz and Westinghouse bringing two interactive talking robots to their displays and US Steel and Alcoa hosting large exhibits.
- April 13, 1982: Rev. Jerry Falwell
- October 8–11, 1982: The Pittsburgh Steelers open team archives and memorabilia to public display as part of the "50 Seasons of Celebration".
- October 9, 1982: Howard Cosell hosts the "50 Seasons Celebration Dinner" for the Pittsburgh Steelers as 2,500 attend with Supreme Court Justice White, Pete Rozelle, Art Rooney and Count Basie and his orchestra providing entertainment as WPXI and WTAE provide live coverage.
- June 24–29, 1983: United Church of Christ national convention.
- December 2, 1983: Gulf Oil Corporation holds its annual shareholders meeting with raider T. Boone Pickens speaking.
- April 5–6, 1984: Democratic Party National Primary Debate with Walter Mondale, Jesse Jackson and Gary Hart speaking on both days.
- June 1985: InventHelp organizes the first INPEX (Invention and New Product Exposition), the world's largest invention trade show.
- July 13, 1986: Peter Popoff conducts a ministry as protesters spread pamphlets outside.
- June 26–30, 1987: American Baptists National Convention.
- March 2–5, 1988: Remaking Cities Conference with the Prince of Wales as featured speaker on the last two days.
- October 27, 1988: George H. W. Bush-Michael Dukakis presidential debate (cancelled).
- March 15, 1989: A 134-seat film theater is completed as an annex to the center.

=== 1990s ===
- April 1990: The Abortion protesters trial of 11 defendants
- August 5–11, 1991: Jesse Jackson, Louis Wade Sullivan and Benjamin Hooks 30th annual Progressive National Baptist Convention.
- August 14, 1991: President Bush is the keynote speaker to the Fraternal Order of Police National Convention.
- April 6, 1992: Former British prime minister Margaret Thatcher speaks on world events.
- August 12, 1992: Bill Clinton is the keynote speaker at the American Federation of Teachers National Conference.
- October 31, 1994: President Clinton speaks to local leaders and campaigners on the eve of mid-term elections.
- 1996: ACM/IEEE Supercomputing Conference
- July 17, 1997: President Clinton is the keynote speaker to the 88th NAACP National Convention, held in Pittsburgh for the first the since 1931.
- September 24, 1997: President Clinton speaks at the AFL-CIO National Convention.
- November 16, 1997: Patriarch Bartholomew I of Constantinople conducts a divine liturgy.

=== 2000s ===
- October 11, 2000: President Clinton is the featured speaker during a campaign rally.
- July 1, 2001: The old convention center is imploded.
- July 26–30, 2003: Urban League National Convention with President Bush speaking.
- December 2, 2003: President Bush conducts a townhall meeting.
- April 15–18, 2004: National Rifle Association Convention with Vice President Dick Cheney and Ted Nugent as speakers.
- April 19, 2004: President Bush delivers a major address at the center.
- July 31, 2004: Election Rally with President Bush as speaker.
- April 27 – May 7, 2004: United Methodist Church National Conference.
- November 6–12, 2004: SC, The International Conference for High Performance Computing Networking, Storage, and Analysis.
- July 25, 2005: Vice President Cheney delivers a major address.
- June 15–18, 2006: Anthrocon has its first year in Pittsburgh and at the center.
- July 7–11, 2006: Major League Baseball All-Star Game Fanfest
- April 20, 2007: National Women's Health & the Environment Conference with Fran Drescher and Teresa Heinz Kerry as speakers.
- November 4, 2007: Steve Sabol hosts the Pittsburgh Steelers 75th anniversary gala, Chuck Noll's last public appearance.
- Spring 2008: The Dapper Dan Awards Banquet
- April 14, 2008: Alliance for American Manufacturing National convention with Hillary Clinton and Barack Obama as speakers.
- May 8–15, 2008: U.S. Chess Federation National Championships.
- August 9, 2008: Democratic National Platform Convention with Janet Napolitano, Howard Dean and Deval Patrick among others.
- September 21–24, 2008: 27th annual National Recycling Coalition conference.

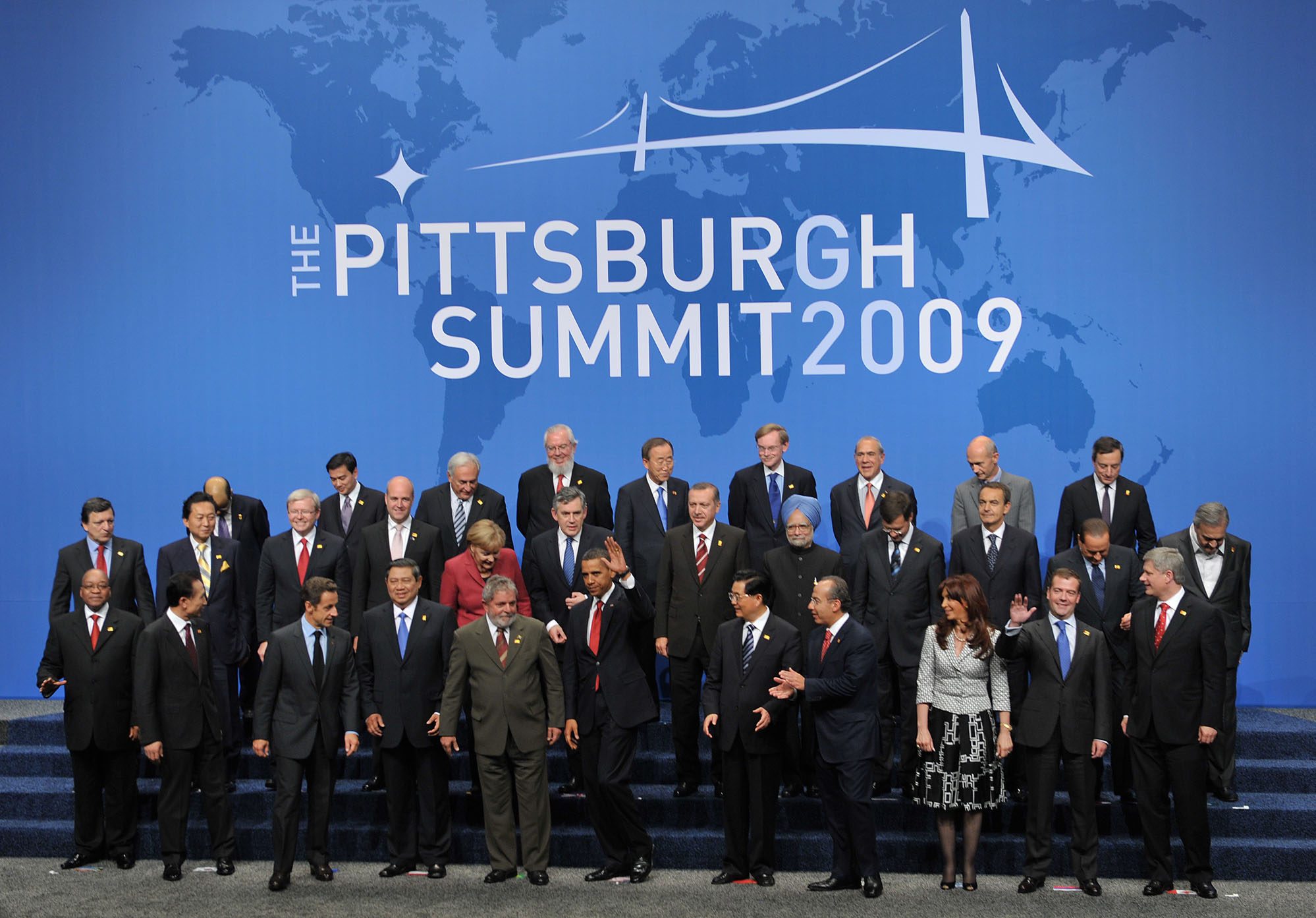
2009 G-20 Pittsburgh summit (September 24–25, 2009)

- March 16–20, 2009: Annual March National Meeting for the American Physical Society.
- April 3–5, 2009: Tekkoshocon
- June 28–29, 2009: 8th Annual International Society for Bipolar Disorders Conference.
- July 30 – August 2, 2009: Forrest Wood Cup National Family Fun Zone & Awards Ceremony.
- August 6–9, 2009: American Philatelic Society's StampShow.
- August 13–16, 2009: Netroots Nation National convention with Bill Clinton and Howard Dean speaking.
- Pittsburgh Golf Show.
- August 21, 2009: National Truck Driving Championships.
- September 13–17, 2009: AFL-CIO National Convention, with President Obama and Caroline Kennedy as featured speakers.
- September 24–25, 2009: Global20 summit with President Obama and dozens of other world leaders.
- October 19, 2009: 1st Annual DUG East is held.
- 2009: Biomedical Engineering Society National Conference.

=== 2010s ===
- April 8–11, 2010: Tekkoshocon
- September 26–29, 2010: Airports Council International annual conference.
- November 3–5, 2010: The second annual DUG East conference.
- April 28 – May 1, 2011: National Rifle Association National Convention with Pat Toomey, Jason Altmire, Mike Huckabee, Lt. Col. Oliver North, Ken Blackwell, Jeff Foxworthy and Ted Nugent
- May 16–18, 2011: American Society for Quality Annual National Meeting.
- July 4–9, 2011: Mennonite Church USA National Convention.
- July 23, 2011: Pittsburgh Steelers quarterback Ben Roethlisberger holds a 400-person all-star gala reception for his wedding with Ambassador Rooney, Triple H and Merrill Hoge.
- September 28–29, 2011: American Idol call-back auditions with Jennifer Lopez, Steven Tyler, Randy Jackson and Ryan Seacrest.
- May 13–18, 2012: Intel International Science and Engineering Fair
- June 14–17, 2012: Anthrocon, exceeding 5,000 attendees.
- The Dapper Dan Awards 2011–2012
- April 4–7, 2013: Tekkoshocon
- April 10–12, 2013: North American Prospect Expo East
- August 3–7, 2013: The National Organization of Black Law Enforcement Executives
- September 14–15, 2013: Steel City Tattoo convention.
- November 13–15, 2013 DUG East convention with George W. Bush as keynote speaker.
- April 3–6, 2014: Tekko
- April 9–11, 2014 North American Prospect Expo East.
- July 3–6, 2014: Anthrocon
- August 20–23, 2014: US Gymnastics National Congress and Tradeshow
- April 16–19, 2015: Tekko
- July 9–12, 2015: Anthrocon
- March 31, 2016: Bernie Sanders presidential campaign rally
- April 13, 2016: Donald Trump presidential campaign rally
- January 7–9, 2019: Hosted Annual PCMA event
- July 4–7, 2019: Anthrocon

== Transportation access ==
The Convention Center is served by exits on Interstate 579, Interstate 279 and Interstate 376 as well as its location within five blocks of both the Wood Street and Penn Station transit stops on the Pittsburgh subway system.

Penn Station also serves Amtrak, providing regular direct inter-city rail links.

Both the Megabus intercity service and the local Port Authority of Allegheny County buses also stop at the center.

== National television ==
- Three Rivers, the CBS medical drama, used the convention center for some scenes depicting the hospital.
- Justified, the FX Network drama, used the center for interior shots of the "airport".
- Smith, a CBS crime drama that showcases the convention center's interior waterway during Ray Liotta's and Amy Smart's escape chase scene with the Pittsburgh Police. The exterior riverside of the center is shown prominently as the gang transfers to a speed boat on the Allegheny River.
- The Colbert Report 2012 from the National Rifle Association convention held at the center.
- The Rachel Maddow Show 2011 with Meghan McCain and Ricky Burgess.
