= Sports & Exhibition Authority of Pittsburgh and Allegheny County =

Municipal authority

Agency overview
- Formed: February 3, 1954
- Superseding agency: Public Auditorium Authority of Pittsburgh and Allegheny County
- Jurisdiction: City of Pittsburgh, Allegheny County, Pennsylvania
- Agency executive: John Chalovich, Chairman
- Website: http://www.pgh-sea.com/

The Sports & Exhibition Authority of Pittsburgh and Allegheny County (also known as the Sports & Exhibition Authority or SEA) is a municipal authority that owns and operates public sports and entertainment venues in Allegheny County, Pennsylvania and the City of Pittsburgh.

== History ==
The Sports & Exhibition Authority of Pittsburgh and Allegheny County was founded as the Public Auditorium Authority of Pittsburgh and Allegheny County. In November 1999, it was renamed to its current name. It owns PNC Park, Acrisure Stadium, David L. Lawrence Convention Center, North Shore Riverfront Park, PPG Paints Arena, and the North Shore Parking Garage.

In July 1998, the SEA developed the "Destination Financing Plan" to encourage Pittsburgh's image as a travel destination. The plan financed the complete redesign and expansion of the David L. Lawrence Convention Center as well as the construction of PNC Park and Acrisure Stadium. The $1 billion in funds for these projects was raised from hotel tax and sales tax revenues, ticket surcharges for Pittsburgh Steelers tickets, parking revenues, state appropriations, federal funds, corporate funds, foundation money, and team contributions.

In July 2013, the SEA along with the Pittsburgh Penguins plan to submit a proposal to City Council that will revitalize the 28 acres on which the Mellon Arena sat. This will likely include 1,100-1,200 housing units, 200,000 square feet of retail, 600,000 square feet of office space, and will likely be LEED N-D certified.
