= Pittsburgh Intergovernmental Cooperation Authority =

Governmental agency in Pittsburgh, Pennsylvania

Agency overview
- Formed: 2004
- Jurisdiction: Pittsburgh
- Headquarters: Four North Shore Center; 106 Isabella Street; Suite 105; Pittsburgh, PA
- Agency executive: Nicholas D. Varischetti, chair
- Website: www.pghica.org

The Pittsburgh Intergovernmental Cooperation Authority (Pittsburgh ICA, also known as the Intergovernmental Cooperation Authority for Cities of the Second Class), is a special administrative body that was created by the Commonwealth of Pennsylvania to oversee the finances of the City of Pittsburgh.

== History ==
The Pittsburgh ICA was created by the Pennsylvania General Assembly though the Intergovernmental Cooperation Authority Act for Cities of the Second Class or Act 11 of 2004 on February 12, 2004.

The Pittsburgh ICA is charged with "providing for financing" in Pittsburgh. It may only consider whether city budgets "are balanced, based upon prudent, reasonable and appropriate assumptions and if they comply with the city’s pending Act 47 recovery plan. Policy questions are outside its legal jurisdiction when approving or disapproving budgets." The Pittsburgh ICA operates within the context of an "Intergovernmental Cooperation Agreement" between it and the City of Pittsburgh.

The Pittsburgh ICA has had difficulties with its financial records.

== See also ==
- Special-purpose district
- Municipal authority (Pennsylvania)
- Pennsylvania Intergovernmental Cooperation Authority (Philadelphia)
