= Municipal authority (Pennsylvania) =

Type of government

A municipal authority is a form of special-purpose governmental unit in Pennsylvania. The municipal authority is an alternate vehicle for accomplishing public purposes without the direct action of counties, municipalities and school districts. These purposes commonly include the acquisition, financing, construction and operation of projects such as water supply and sewer systems, airports, transit systems, parking garages, flood control systems, parks, and similar entities. An authority may fix and collect rentals or other charges and may issue revenue bonds. A board appointed by the establishing government or governments governs each authority.

A municipal authority may be said to be an independent corporate agent of the Commonwealth of Pennsylvania, exercising governmental, as well as private corporate power, in assisting the Commonwealth in meeting the needs of its citizens. Most, but not all, municipal authorities operate under Pennsylvania's Municipality Authorities Act.

== Reasons for establishing municipal authorities ==
Common reasons for establishing municipal authorities include financing a project without tapping the general taxing or borrowing power of a municipality, facilitating the cooperative involvement of several municipalities in a project, and distancing the operation of a project from the political considerations inherent in direct municipal operation.

All these reasons were involved, for example, when the Northland Public Library Authority was established to enable several municipalities to jointly own and operate a public library. The authority acquired the land for a new library, borrowed the construction money, built the building, and now operates the library. Absent the municipal authority, matters of joint ownership, joint financing, and joint operational control could be so thorny as to prevent the library's development in the first place, let alone allowing it to operate in an effective and businesslike manner.

== Census of municipal authorities ==
In its 2002 Census of Governments, the U.S. Census Bureau listed 1,885 municipal authorities in Pennsylvania. Prominent among them are the Allegheny County Airport Authority, which operates Pittsburgh International Airport and Allegheny County Airport, large sewer authorities in Allegheny and Delaware counties, and parking authorities in Philadelphia and Pittsburgh. There are also important parking authorities in Allentown, Bethlehem, Erie, Harrisburg, Lancaster, Reading and Scranton. Some authorities, such as the public transportation authorities in Philadelphia and Pittsburgh, operate under special legislation rather than the Municipality Authorities Act.

== See also ==
- Off-budget enterprise
- Public benefit corporation
- Pennsylvania Intergovernmental Cooperation Authority
- Pittsburgh Intergovernmental Cooperation Authority
- Port Authority of Allegheny County
- Southeastern Pennsylvania Transportation Authority (SEPTA)
- Allegheny County Sanitary Authority
