= Kirari =

Kirari may refer to:

== People with the given name ==
- Kirari (singer) (born 1980), Japanese singer
- Kirari Yamaguchi (山口 稀良莉, born 2005), Japanese women's professional shogi player

== Places ==
- Kirari (Delhi Assembly constituency)
- Kirari Suleman Nagar

== Music ==
- Kirari (album), a 2011 album by Dazzle Vision
- "Kirari" (Dazzle Vision song), a song by Dazzle Vision
- "Kirari" (Fujii Kaze song), a song by Fujii Kaze
- Best Kirari, is a greatest hits album of the character Kirari Tsukishima
- Kirari to Fuyu, is the third studio album of the character Kirari Tsukishima

== Other uses ==
- OICETS or Kirari, an experimental satellite
