= List of Shakugan no Shana episodes =

Shakugan no Shana DVD volume 1 cover, released in Japan on January 25, 2006

Shakugan no Shana is an anime series including three television series, original video animation (OVA) episodes, and bonus shorts. The episodes are based on the light novel series of the same name written by Yashichiro Takahashi, with illustrations drawn by Noizi Ito. Produced by the animation studio J.C.Staff, the episodes are directed by Takashi Watanabe, written by Yasuko Kobayashi, and feature character design by Mai Otsuka who based the designs on Ito's original concept. The sound director is Jin Aketagawa, and the soundtrack is composed by Kow Otani. The story follows Yuji Sakai, a high school boy who inadvertently becomes involved in an age-old conflict between forces of balance and imbalance in existence. In the process, he befriends a fighter for the balancing force and names her "Shana".

A 24-episode TV series aired in Japan between October 6, 2005, and March 23, 2006, on TV Kanagawa, and aired at later dates than TV Kanagawa on TV Saitama, Chiba TV, MBS TV, TV Aichi, and Animax. Later, an OVA episode titled Shakugan no Shana SP, which takes place after the events of episode 13, was released on December 8, 2006. The same core production staff who produced the first season of Shakugan no Shana returned for later projects. The 24-episode second season, titled Shakugan no Shana Second (灼眼のシャナII), aired between October 5, 2007, and March 28, 2008, on MBS, and aired at later dates than MBS on CBC, TBS, Bandai Channel, and Animax. A four-episode OVA series titled Shakugan no Shana S was released on BD/DVD from October 23, 2009, to September 29, 2010. The 24-episode third season, titled Shakugan no Shana Final (灼眼のシャナIII -Final-), aired between October 8, 2011, and March 24, 2012, on Tokyo MX, and aired at later dates than Tokyo MX on Chiba TV, TV Kanagawa, MBS, CBC, AT-X, and BS11.

The series was licensed for North American distribution by Geneon. After Geneon withdrew from the North American market, Geneon and Funimation Entertainment announced an agreement to distribute select titles in North America. While Geneon still retains the license, Funimation assumes exclusive rights to the manufacturing, marketing, sales and distribution of select titles. Shakugan no Shana was one of several titles involved in the deal. Funimation licensed the second and third seasons, and the OVA series.

== Series overview ==
Season	Episodes	Originally released	
Season	Episodes	First released	Last released
1	24	October 6, 2005	March 23, 2006
2	24	October 5, 2007	March 28, 2008
3	24	October 8, 2011	March 24, 2012

== Episode list ==
=== Season 1 (2005–06) ===
No.	Title	Original release date
1	"The End of Everything, The Beginning of One Thing"; Transliteration: "Subete no Owari, Hitotsu no Hajimari" (Japanese: 全ての終わり, 一つの始まり)	October 6, 2005
The story starts with Yuji Sakai having an ordinary life at school in Misaki City, but when he wanders around after school, he finds time suddenly frozen, and only he can move. Two Rinnes appear and start to devour the lives of the humans around him, then attempt to capture Yuji as well. Just when he is about to be devoured, a girl with red flaming hair and blazing eyes appears and destroys the monster. She returns everything to normal and turns to leave, but when Yuji sees blue flames in the bodies of some of the humans and within himself, he demands to know what has just happened. The girl casually explains that the real Yuji Sakai is dead, and he is just a Torch—a temporary replacement that will eventually disappear from existence.
2	"The Burning Flame"; Transliteration: "Tomoru Honō" (Japanese: 灯る炎)	October 13, 2005
The girl explains to Yuji that she is a Flame Haze, someone who supervises and restores balance between the Crimson world and the one Yuji lives in, and that torches will eventually go out. She tells him that he is also a Mystes, someone who possesses a Treasure Tool (Hōgu) in his body, although she is unsure what the treasure is. Yuji fails to understand immediately, and she shows him a classmate of his–Yukari Hirai–who is also a Torch and is about to burn out. Despite trying to save her, Hirai eventually burns out from existence. Yuji decides that the Flame Haze (who is known as the Flame-Haired, Blazing Eyed Hunter, in possession of the sword Nietono No Shana) needs a name and calls her Shana, after her sword.
3	"The Torch and the Flame Haze"; Transliteration: "Tōchi to Fureimu Heizu" (Japanese: トーチとフレイムヘイズ)	October 20, 2005
With Yukari Hirai having already disappeared, Shana joins Yuji's class in her place by using the remains of Yukari's existence in order to keep an eye on him. The next day at school, as Shana terrifies the teachers by seeing through flaws their teaching and demonstrating brazen defiance to authority in classes, the same Rinne from before attacks Shana once more. Friagne the Hunter arrives, noting the Mystes and creating carnage, and then leaves. Yuji shares his Power of Existence so Shana can repair the damages without sacrificing any of the classmates. Later that night, Shana notices Yuji's torch suddenly restore itself at the stroke of midnight.
4	"The Confused Flame Haze"; Transliteration: "Madoi no Fureimu Heizu" (Japanese: 惑いのフレイムヘイズ)	October 27, 2005
Shana unexpectedly starts living in Yuji's house for the time being. A gym teacher gives Yuji's class a hard time during a track-run until Shana knocks him out cold with a hard kick to the gut. Later, another Flame Haze named Margery Daw, the Chanter of Elegies, comes to Misaki City and starts a battle with Shana. Later, Shana comes back to Yuji's house badly injured but angrily refuses his assistance, blaming her loss of the fight on him.
5	"Respective Thoughts"; Transliteration: "Sorezore no Omoi" (Japanese: それぞれの想い)	November 3, 2005
While on a date with Kazumi Yoshida at the art museum, Yuji meets Lamis, the Corpse Collector, who has been eating many of the Torches in town whose flames are about to burnt out in order to fulfill a wish of his, and they have a friendly conversation. Meanwhile, Margery Daw has a run-in with Friagne the Hunter, Shana considers Yuji as she comes struggling with an emotion she does not understand.
6	"Complication, Activation, Confrontation"; Transliteration: "Kousaku Hatsudō Taiketsu" (Japanese: 交錯·発動·対決)	November 10, 2005
Yuji follows Shana in her battle against Friagne and gets captured. Friagne decides to accelerate his plans and begin the City Devouring process sooner rather than later. Shana is knocked down, but Margery Daw comes at the last minute. Together they defeat him, and Yuji takes Friagne's anti-flame ring. As Yuji fades away, the clock strikes midnight and Yuji's Power of Existence is restored. Alastor - the God of Atonement - confirms the Treasure inside of Yuji is the Midnight Lost Child, which will restore his Power of Existence every day at midnight.
7	"The Two Flame Hazes"; Transliteration: "Futari no Fureimu Heizu" (Japanese: 二人のフレイムヘイズ)	November 17, 2005
Yuji has requested that Shana start to train him for future battles as he believes he may be of some help to her. Margery Daw gets assistance from Yuji's classmates, Keisaku Satou and Eita Tanaka. Still on the trail of the Corpse Collector with the intention of ending his life by using Friagne's Haridan, a crystallize map of the city's torches.
8	"The Beautiful Goblet"; Transliteration: "Uruwashi no Goburetto" (Japanese: 麗しのゴブレット)	November 24, 2005
The battle between Margery Daw and Shana has finally begun while the fate of the entire city rests in the balance. The Corpse Collector discusses with Margery about her enemy - the Silver. After the battle, the Corpse Collector says goodbye to Yuji and Shana and leaves Misaki City, Margery stays with Satou and Tanaka for now. The next morning, Kazumi is concerned about the relationship between Yuji and Shana.
9	"The Poolside of Love and Desire"; Transliteration: "Koi to Yokubō no Pūrusaido" (Japanese: 恋と欲望のプールサイド)	December 1, 2005
Due to it being so hot outside, Ike Hayato hands out tickets to a newly opened Misaki water park and ultimately it is decided that Yuji and his friends will go. Once there, they participate in a contest; including Makate Ogata. Margery Daw unexpectedly shows up, though Shana cannot sense any intent to kill. Ike helps Kazumi get close to Yuji, though Shana begins to feel jealous.
10	"Entangled Feelings"; Transliteration: "Karamaru Omoi" (Japanese: 絡まる想い)	December 8, 2005
Yuji's training is not going well, so Shana wants to raise the stakes by creating a Seal one day after school. However, business with the student council does not allow Yuji to train after school, and Shana lashes out at him for backing out of the plans she had set for him to train once school was finished. Yuji takes advice from his mother and comes to understand Shana more. Also, another (abandoned) Rinne appears.
11	"Yuji, Shana, and Kisses"; Transliteration: "Yūji to Shana to Kisu" (Japanese: 悠二とシャナとキス)	December 15, 2005
Shana's feelings towards Yuji are growing stronger and so Shana asks Yuji's mother, Chigusa, for advice about the meaning of a kiss. Ike tells Kazumi that Yuji and Shana are just friends, but Kazumi is still unsure. Later, Alastor and Chigusa talk via phone about Shana's social skills. Meanwhile, two more Denizens, Sorath and Tiriel, are on a search for the Nietono no Shana.
12	"Flowers Bloom in the Cradle"; Transliteration: "Yurikago ni Hana wa Saite" (Japanese: ゆりかごに花は咲いて)	December 22, 2005
After seeing Yuji and Shana together at the river one night, Kazumi's feelings for Yuji are hitting the breaking point until she finally confronts Shana about it. Yuji also asks Ike what he thinks of Kazumi. Suddenly, the two sibling Denizens, Sorath and Tiriel, show themselves and Shana rushes into battle while Yuji tries to be useful.
13	"Declaration of War Behind the School"; Transliteration: "Kōsha Ura no Sensenfukoku" (Japanese: 校舎裏の宣戦布告)	January 5, 2006
Shana finds a way to get out of the clutches of the two incestuous Denizens during their battle. A Crimson Lord, Sydonay, finds out about Yuji's treasure. Meanwhile, Yuji gets help from Margery Daw to defeat them as well on top of Misaki Bridge and takes their sword, the Bloodsucker. Shana gives Yuji melon bread as a prize. Shana and Kazumi accept a challenge to win Yuji's heart.
14	"A Great Person"; Transliteration: "Idai Naru Mono" (Japanese: 偉大なる者)	January 12, 2006
Back before Shana became a Flame Haze, she was living in a large castle-like structure floating in the sky, the Heavenly Palace (Tendo-kyu), along with Alastor, the skeleton Shiro, who trains with Shana, and a maid and Flame Haze, Wilhelmina Carmel. One day, a Denizen attacks Wilhelmina, and Shiro goes completely berserk after Shana, in an attempt to finally best him, pranks him by dropping him in a large pit of ketchup, which reminds him of blood. In his panicked craze, he uses his power to destroy a barrier of invisibility, revealing the Palace to a bike-riding Denizen as a most fearsome Mystes, Tenma Kuiko, arrives on the scene looking for a battle.
15	"The Day the Flame Was Born"; Transliteration: "Honō no Umareta Hi" (Japanese: 炎の生まれた日)	January 19, 2006
With Tendo-kyu, the castle Alastor and Shana resided in, destroyed, the time has now come for Shana to finally become the Flame-Haired Burning-Eyed Hunter. However, she must first enlist the help of Tenmoku Ikko, a very powerful Mystes.
16	"The Flame-Haired, Burning-Eyed Hunter"; Transliteration: "Empatsu Shakugan no Uchite" (Japanese: 炎髪灼眼の討ち手)	January 26, 2006
Now that she has become a Flame Haze, Shana must defeat Tenmoku Ikko and take his sword, Nietono no Shana. After seeing the fallen kingdom reside with Shiro, Wilhelmina and Shana part ways and leave on their journey as Flame Hazes. The story shifts back to the present, where Yuji asks Shana why she likes melon bread, but she does not tell him.
17	"A New Chapter"; Transliteration: "Aratanaru Joshō" (Japanese: 新たなる序章)	February 2, 2006
The Misago Festival is coming soon and Kazumi has made up her mind to confess her feelings to Yuji there. However, she meets an ancient Flame Haze, Khamsin Nbh'w, who tells her the truth about the world. Margery warns Shana and Yuji about the Bal Masqué, an organization led by powerful Crimson Lords known as the Trinity, and Denizens are making a move in Misaki City.
18	"A Shattering Wish"; Transliteration: "Kudakeru Negai" (Japanese: 砕ける願い)	February 9, 2006
When Yuji does not come home after school on the day of the festival, his mother and Shana go to the festival to look for him, but before long another Denizen shows itself. Khamsin set up tunes around the city as he waits for Kazumi's cooperation. Worried about the revelation, Kazumi discovers that Yuji is indeed a Torch. Shana gets upset seeing the situation between Yuji and Kazumi at the festival.
19	"Within the Battle"; Transliteration: "Tatakai no Naka de" (Japanese: 戦いの中で)	February 16, 2006
Shana reveals her Flame Haze identity to Kazumi, and Yuji finds out about Satou and Tanaka associating with Margery. The Seeking Research Denizen Dantalion has already started his plan to open up a gate to another dimension above the festival and now all three Flame Hazes, humans; Satou, Tanaka (after hearing Ogata's confession), Kazumi, and following Yuji's amaze instinct, must work together to defeat him. Khamsin gives Kazumi a treasure before he departs for now.
20	"Heartless Wilhelmina"; Transliteration: "Hijō no Viruherumina" (Japanese: 非情のヴィルヘルミナ)	February 23, 2006
Wilhelmina arrives in Misaki City and meets up with Shana again, cleaning up Hirai's apartment room. Yuji and Kazumi walk together during a sunny day. Wilhelmina wonders about Shana's behavior when talking with Chigusa. Meanwhile, Margery Daw finally leaves Misaki City without saying goodbye to either Eita or Keisaku. Also, Wilhelmina comes to the conclusion that Yuji must be destroyed in order to hide the Midnight Lost Child and protect the balance of the world.
21	"Diverging Feelings"; Transliteration: "Tōzakaru Omoi" (Japanese: 遠ざかる想い)	March 2, 2006
Shana is able to persuade Wilhelmina, at least for now, to not destroy Yuji, who has finally decided to leave Misaki City in order to protect it. Shana in a predicament to decide Yuji's situation. Kazumi, Satou, and Tanaka tell Yuji they want to help. Later at the bonfire which burned many of the decorations from the festival, a spell is activated. Wilhelmina attempts to kill Yuji again but Shana stands in the way of her attack. Yuji gets captured by the Bal Masqué.
22	"The Flickering Flame"; Transliteration: "Yuragu Honō" (Japanese: 揺らぐ炎)	March 9, 2006
After getting heavily injured, Shana must recover in the care of Wilhelmina. Alastor explains to Wilhelmina that Shana been irritated with inexperience emotions since she met Yuji. Meanwhile at Seirei-den, the Master Throne, Hecate begins to synchronize with the Midnight Lost Child residing within Yuji. Yuji's memories and feelings flow into Hecate. A fountain of existence pours over the city. Kazumi, Eita, and Keisaku bring over the sword Blutsauger to Shana and tells her to bring Yuji back, not as a Flame Haze but as Yukari Hirai.
23	"Battle at the Palace of the Stars"; Transliteration: "Seireiden no Tatakai" (Japanese: 星黎殿の戦い)	March 16, 2006
While fighting within the Seirei-den, a spell is cast which drains their power of existence for a time, however, Margery Daw comes back and destroys the spell. Shana and Wilhelmina fight against Sydonay, and Crimson Lord Bel Peol. Ultimately, it is now up to Shana to decide the fate of Yuji.
24	"Crimson Thoughts"; Transliteration: "Guren no Omoi" (Japanese: 紅蓮の想い)	March 23, 2006
After managing to defeat Hecate, Yuji reunites with Shana, but the city is about to be destroyed regardless. However, there is one final plan, to summon Alastor (Heaven-and-Earth Sundering), though Shana's life may be on the line if it succeeds. Shana then confesses her love to Yuji, thinking that she will die. In the end, they both survive and return to Misaki City.
13.5 OVA	"Shakugan no Shana Special: Love and Outdoor Hot Spring Tutorial!"; Transliteration: "Shakugan no Shana Tokubetsu Hen Koi to Onsen no Kōgai Gakushū!" (Japanese: 灼眼のシャナ 特別編 恋と温泉の校外学習!)	December 8, 2006
Yuji's school goes on a field trip to a hot spring where Makate Ogata tries to do something about her feelings towards Eita Tanaka. Towards the middle of the field trip, Ogata starts to get the idea that Satou and Tanaka are lovers upon hearing about a charm when climbing a stairs to a shrine. Shana and Kazumi fight over Yuji. Then later everyone goes home with a complicated relationship.

=== Season 2: Second (2007–08) ===
No.	Title	Original release date
1 (25)	"Time Again"; Transliteration: "Futatabi no Koku" (Japanese: 再びの刻)	October 5, 2007
At the supposedly start of a new semester, Yuji has been put to sleep by a Denizen as he encounters events from the past in a dream. When he realize he was only dreaming, the spell was broken. He awoke to see Shana destroying the Denizen, Mare, calling it "weak". However, it was not its true form. Walking towards school, Yuji questions about Shana's confession from before, but too nervous to respond.
2 (26)	"Prelude to Everything"; Transliteration: "Subete no Joshō" (Japanese: 全ての序章)	October 12, 2007
Shana practices how to make home-made melon bread for Yuji, while he does his training with Wilhelmina and Alastor. They discover Yuji's Power of Existence is greater than before because of Hecate. At school, Yuji is placed in a dream again by Mare, along with Shana and Kazumi, in another plot to steal the Midnight Lost Child, but he is saved thanks to a Keeper protection unknowingly placed on it.
3 (27)	"The Suspicious Transfer Student"; Transliteration: "Giwaku no Tenkōsei" (Japanese: 疑惑の転校生)	October 19, 2007
A student that looks very much like Hecate, Fumina Konoe, has transferred into Yuji's class. By using a Seal, Shana want to make sure if she is Hecate or not. Also, another Denizen appears before Shana and Konoe.
4 (28)	"The Distressed Girls"; Transliteration: "Urei no Shōjotachi" (Japanese: 憂いの少女達)	October 26, 2007
Yuji and Ogata helps Konoe get used to life at school. The classmates, including Konoe, go to a newly opened super-size restaurant. Shana and Kazumi grow jealous of Konoe's attachment to Yuji. Both experience unusual behaviors.
5 (29)	"The Family Dinner Table"; Transliteration: "Kazoku no Shokutaku" (Japanese: 家族の食卓)	November 2, 2007
Shana and Kazumi continue brooding over Konoe and Yuji's growing relationship; Wilhelmina starts taking parenting advice from Chigusa and tried to cook a home-made meal for Shana. Ike lets Yuji know to be considerate of those around him.
6 (30)	"Eve of Trouble"; Transliteration: "Shiren no Zenya" (Japanese: 試練の前夜)	November 9, 2007
School resumes and the class teacher springs a surprise test on the class. Ogata suggests everyone stay at Satou's place for an overnight study session and reluctantly Shana comes as well. Margery Daw ends up giving insightful advice to Ogata and Kazumi about social affections with those of which they love. They and Shana finally gain their confidence back.
7 (31)	"Hayato Ike, His Day of Glory"; Transliteration: "Ike Hayato, Eikō no Hi" (Japanese: 池速人, 栄光の日)	November 16, 2007
Ike suggested to visit the amusement park as a welcome for Konoe, but the carefully planned outing turns out all wrong when he miscalculated certain events. His underlying plan of impressing Kazumi was believed to be ruined initially, but he resorted to asking Kazumi to ride the Ferris wheel with him, which he was confident he would not get sick in. Mid-way through the ride, he gets sick anyway. Konoe and Kazumi thank Ike for the outing.
8 (32)	"The Door to the Past"; Transliteration: "Kako e no Tobira" (Japanese: 過去への扉)	November 23, 2007
Starting off with Yuji being trained by Shana and Wilhelmina. Yuji managed to defeat a Rinne that Wilhelmina summoned. Satou returns and requests to be trained by Margery Daw. However, she declines and subsequently tells Satou and Tanaka about her past. In it, there is a boy Flame Haze, and the story subsequently tells of the boy and Margery Daw in New York City 1930s. The Boy is revealed to be named Yuri Chvojka.
9 (33)	"The Milestone of Sorrow"; Transliteration: "Kanashimi no Mairusutōn" (Japanese: 悲しみのマイルストーン)	November 30, 2007
Yuji is training with Shana in order to learn how to cast a Seal. The story shifts back to Margery's past, where she attempts to take down two Denizens. One of them, Anabel, lures her into a trap where Sydonay manages to inflict a fatal wound on her. Just as they are about to kill Margery, Yuri comes to attack, managing to save Margery. However, Yuri becomes fatally wounded and dies in battle, ending in a draw. The story shifts back to Yuji's training where he succeeds in casting a Seal for the first time, however, the color of the flame is silver! Shana and Alastor are completely shock when they see the flame, recalling that the object of Margery's revenge also had a silver flame.
10 (34)	"The Man who Returned"; Transliteration: "Kaettekita Otoko" (Japanese: 帰って来た男)	December 7, 2007
Yuji is perplexed about his silver flame. A mysterious man appears near Yuji's home, and is spotted by Shana when he is following her and Kazumi. Shana plans to ambush the suspicious man. He manages to dodge the attack and reveals himself to be Yuji's dad, Kantaro. Chigusa and Kantaro give advice to Shana and Kazumi about their affection towards Yuji.
11 (35)	"The Promised Pair"; Transliteration: "Yakusoku no Futari" (Japanese: 約束の二人)	December 14, 2007
The culture festival is approaching, and everyone in school is preparing for it. Shana's friendship with Kazumi becomes closer. Wilhelmina returns with the results on the Midnight Lost Child's Keeper and she meets up with Shana and Yuji to explain its origins. It is revealed to be a treasure created by Crimson Lord Pheles to ensure that her lover Johan—a Mystes like Yuji would not die and stay with her forever. However, the pair were defeated somehow long ago and the Midnight Lost Child was lost, later being transported inside Yuji. After also hearing about Yuji's silver flame, Wilhelmina warns Yuji and Shana to be on their guard against the possible return of Pheles to retrieve the Midnight Lost Child.
12 (36)	"The Clear Autumn Festival Begins"; Transliteration: "Seishū Sai Hajimaru" (Japanese: 清秋祭始まる)	December 21, 2007
Shana and the others enter the culture festival. Wilhelmina decides to delay telling Margery about Yuji's silver flames. Wilhelmina drags Margery to the festival to see Shana and the others. Margery eventually agrees to wait for the following night for Wilhelmina to tell her the entire truth of Silver. Meanwhile, Yuji, Shana and Kazumi ended up qualifying for the Grand Prix, and in the end, Shana ends up winning the best costume award. She plans to confess her love to Yuji on stage and just as she was about to do so, Yuji's hand touched another girl's hand, then a tornado appeared. Pheles had made her appearance in front of Yuji, much to the surprise of the Shana and the other Flame Hazes.
13 (37)	"Convergence, Then an Omen"; Transliteration: "Shūsoku, Soshite Kizashi" (Japanese: 収束, そして兆し)	January 11, 2008
A Seal was uncontrollably set up by Yuji, causing Margery to go berserk upon seeing the color of the flame. Wilhelmina attempts to control the Interpreter of Condolence while Shana prevents Pheles from taking the Midnight Lost Child out of Yuji. Margery attempts to attack the source of the silver flame in her blind rage, but Yuji was protected by his anti-flame ring and Pheles, who was weakening significantly, with Shana and Wilhelmina working together to restrain both. After Satou and Tanaka plead with Margery to listen to an explanation, Margery realizes her folly and calms down, but only to question Yuji about what he is. Pheles then explains that Johan is inside the Midnight Lost Child and it is not what it was meant to be, and requests The Interpreter of Condolence to check it. Margery then restores everything back to normal with the help of Wilhelmina's ribbons and Yuji's Power of Existence.
14 (38)	"Eternal Lovers"; Transliteration: "Eien no Koibito" (Japanese: 永遠の恋人)	January 18, 2008
As Pheles recovers, she reveals the secret of the Midnight Lost Child, but even she says she does not know what is wrong with the Treasure Tool. Although Pheles is not trusted by the others, Yoshida invites her to attend the festival and Yuji agrees helping Pheles to survive by giving her some of his Power of Existence. At the end of the festival, Pheles' true self awakes and she again tries to get her beloved Johan back. When Pheles comes close to Yuji, a silver arm comes out of his Treasure Tool, piercing Pheles.
15 (39)	"Awakening"; Transliteration: "Kakusei" (Japanese: 覚醒)	January 25, 2008
The Silver awakens within Yuji due to Pheles' second attempt to free Johan. Hecate's secret is finally revealed and reseals the Silver inside Yuji's Treasure Tool. She absorbs Fumina Konoe and joins with Fecor in the fight. When Yuji gets caught in the shockwaves of the battle, Johan is freed and Pheles once again gets to see Johan, Shana gets worried. In the end, Johan reverts to Yuji, Shana hugs him, and Pheles claims she will not go after the Midnight Lost Child because Johan instructed her not to.
16 (40)	"Everlasting Love"; Transliteration: "Tsukisenu Omoi" (Japanese: つきせぬ想い)	February 1, 2008
The festival ends without any more disruptions, and it seems that everybody forgot about Konoe. Before Pheles left, she gives Yoshida a secret Treasure Tool. She wants Yoshida to use this cross shaped Treasure Tool, Giralda, when something strange is happening to Yuji. It will summon Pheles, but to do so, the human who uses it will disappear due to their limited Power of Existence. Yuji requests to take the sword Blutsauger (that was used by Sorath) as a weapon for him to fight with.
17 (41)	"Respective Paths"; Transliteration: "Sorezore no Michi" (Japanese: それぞれの道)	February 8, 2008
Tanaka avoids Margery because of her attack where she had nearly killed Ogata. Yuji is slowly improving in fighting with a sword by training with Shana. Meanwhile, Satou and Tanaka meet in front of a convenience store to talk. Tanaka decides to live a normal life with Ogata and leave Satou and Margery.
18 (42)	"The Intricate Yuji"; Transliteration: "Sakusō no Yūji" (Japanese: 錯綜の悠二)	February 15, 2008
Yuji, unusually determined, continues his training to use his silver flame. Shana and Kazumi are concerned about Yuji's sudden change when Chigusa suddenly gets ill. A Denizen called Zarovee appears in Misaki City. Yuji is confused by Shana and Kazumi's words about his decisions.
19 (43)	"Matters That Could Not Be Said"; Transliteration: "Ienakatta Koto" (Japanese: 言えなかったこと)	February 22, 2008
Yuji is ambushed by Zarovee. With his impressive intellect, he eventually uncovers Zarovee power's and a hidden Wanderer Denizen, and with the help of Tanaka; although reluctant, is able to secretly inform the Flame Hazes. As he comes to understand his friends' concerns, Yuji casts his silver seal and dispatches all of the cloned Denizens, while Shana and Wilhelmina defeat the Wanderer in time before it launch a full-scale attack. Just as they kill the Denizen, a new flame appears in the recesses of the ruins induced in the fight.
20 (44)	"The Scarlet Death Struggle"; Transliteration: "Akaneiro no Shitō" (Japanese: 茜色の死闘)	February 29, 2008
The Destructive Blade, Sabrac, appears from the explosion that engulfs Yuji and everyone else. The overwhelming roar of ruby flames covers Misaki City. Even with heavy wounds, Wilhelmina still faces her nemesis Sabrac; the enemy that she used to fight along with Pheles and Johan.
21 (45)	"Merging Powers"; Transliteration: "Awaseru Chikara" (Japanese: 合わさる力)	March 7, 2008
Wilhelmina struggles against Sabrac who appears to be invincible. Yuji gathers Shana, Margery, Kazumi and Keisaku, and devises a plan to defeat Sabrac. They are successful in severing his energy reserves while Wilhelmina distracts him, and without Power of Existence to draw on, Sabrac loses two more swords and finally falls to Nietono no Shana.
22 (46)	"Christmas Eve"; Transliteration: "Kurisumasu•Ivu" (Japanese: クリスマス・イヴ)	March 14, 2008
After learning that Yuji's mother is pregnant Shana becomes curious about babies and asks his parents and later Kazumi how babies are made. Kantaro also reveals to Yuji that he had an older twin brother who died at birth. Shana and Kazumi decide to write letters to Yuji professing their feelings for him and asking him to choose between them on Christmas Eve near the clock tower. Ike meets Kazumi after she writes her letter and he confesses his love for her, giving her something to think about. At the square the following evening, Hecate suddenly appears, casts a blue hemisphere around the area and removes the Midnight Lost Child from Yuji despite the Keeper.
23 (47)	"The Early Movements of Peril"; Transliteration: "Kinan no Taidō" (Japanese: 危難の胎動)	March 21, 2008
Yuji's Midnight Lost Child has been removed by Hecate, who suddenly appeared before him, and has transferred it to the Denizen with the Silver Flame located within Bal Masqué's secret weapon, the Statue of Pride. The Statue starts to take awaken, with Konoe's memories as its brain and the Midnight Lost Child as its heart. Johan communicates with Kazumi that the Midnight Lost Child has been extracted from Yuji. Meanwhile, Shana, Margery and Wilhelmina manage to get into the blue sphere to save Yuji. Since Margery took the lead, she is severely injured by Sydonay, but this allowed the other two Flame Haze to enter freely.
24 (48)	"That Which Must Be Protected"; Transliteration: "Mamoru beki Mono" (Japanese: 守るべきもの)	March 28, 2008
The Statue of Pride is about to come fully awake. Yuji, making his way to the heart of the Statue, uses Blutsauger to defend himself even though it is depleting his Power of Existence, and he screams the name of the one he most desires to protect, Shana. After a fierce battle with the members of Bal Masqué, Shana is eventually able to break through and enter the Statue of Pride. She meets up with Yuji, and they run to fight the Denizen at the heart of the Statue of Pride which is being controlled by Hecate. Shana and Yuji fight together and manage to beat the Denizen when it hesitates due to Konoe's feelings within Hecate, and Yuji regains the Midnight Lost Child. With its heart destroyed, the Statue of Pride collapses, and Bal Masqué retreats. Afterwards Shana and Kazumi again wait for Yuji to choose between them at their respective locations at the square. It is implied by Shana's joyous reaction that Yuji has chosen her.

=== Season 2.5: S (2009–10) ===
No.	Title	Original release date
1	"Reshuffle"; Transliteration: "Rishaffuru" (Japanese: リシャッフル)	October 23, 2009
While Yuji and Shana rummage through Friagne's old pile of Treasure Tools during a hot summer's day, Yuji finds and uses a telescope-like object, causing him and Shana to switch bodies. Alastor tells the two that the object Yuji has just used is called the Reshuffle. While reversing its effect is just as easy as activating it, the Reshuffle gets lost in junk and the two have to gather the pile and find a better, more isolated spot to search for the Reshuffle.
2	"Domicile"; Transliteration: "Domisairu" (Japanese: ドミサイル)	February 26, 2010
Recently, Shana has been acting strangely. Worried over her well-being, Yuji and Wilhelmina decide to follow her from the shadows after school one day. But later they found out that they want to surprise Wilhelmina.
3	"Overture (Part I)"; Transliteration: "Ōbāchua Zenpen" (Japanese: オーバーチュア 前編)	June 25, 2010
In her early days as a Flame Haze, Shana takes over the identity of a Torch named Junko Ōgami and starts to hunt down the Denizen who killed her. She gets to know who Junko was through the latter's parents.
4	"Overture (Part II)"; Transliteration: "Ōbāchua Kouhen" (Japanese: オーバーチュア 後編)	September 29, 2010
Rummaging through Junko's memories, Shana finds out that Junko has a relationship with a boy named Yukio which caused a spat between her and her mother. She eventually finds and kills the Denizen, which is about to victimize the boy.

=== Season 3: Final (2011–12) ===
No.	Title	Original release date
1 (49)	"A Lost Being"; Transliteration: "Ushinawareta Sonzai" (Japanese: 失われた存在)	October 8, 2011
Yuji Sakai's existence has unexpectedly disappeared on Christmas Eve after the events leading up to the meeting supposed to take place at the Statue of Pride. Like a disappearance of a Torch, all those who have no knowledge of the Crimson World have forgotten him including his closest friends and family. Shana continues training at Chigusa's house, and things are still very awkward between Kazumi and Ike Hayato since Ike's love confession to her. Shana and Kazumi still have hope that Yuji exists due to the fact that their letters given specifically to Yuji have not disappeared. However, it is shown that Yuji still exists but makes a contract with a Crimson Lord and takes the Palace of the Stars' throne as the new leader of Bal Masque.
2 (50)	"What Must Come"; Transliteration: "Kitaru beki Mono" (Japanese: 来るべきもの)	October 15, 2011
Shana receives a response letter from Sophie Sawallisch,. the Braider of Trembling Might, about her report. Her words have made Shana felt uneasy and question herself, though she feels she has come to an understanding of Sophine's meaning during her training. Meanwhile, Yuji officially ascends to the position of new commander of Bal Masque, as Bel Peol announces their ambitions to all Crimson Denizens that are present in Serei-den. Satou Keisaku receives a spell from Margery that allows him to sense a nearby Denizen as he heads off to Outlaw's Tokyo Headquarters. On the train, he senses one but it appears to be in a train in the opposite direction. The other train arrives in Misaki City with Yuji getting off it.
3 (51)	"Starting a Journey"; Transliteration: "Tabidatsu Tame Ni" (Japanese: 旅立つために)	October 22, 2011
Yuji returns to Misaki City. Satou, who sensed a Denizen approaching the city, warns Tanaka. He decides to get to the Haridan where he meets Yoshida, who also decided to go there after being warned by Shana. Yuji walks around the city, reminiscing about all events that he took part since he met Shana. He climbs the top of Misaki Bridge where he and Shana finally meet again.
4 (52)	"Reunions and Chance Meetings"; Transliteration: "Saikai to, Kaikou to" (Japanese: 再会と、邂逅と)	October 29, 2011
Yuji reveals that he is indeed himself but also the Snake of the Festival - the God of Creation. Margery and Wilhelmina come to see what is happening. Yuji says he has come to save Shana from her inevitable fate as a Flame Haze, which is to fight against Denizens for as long as she lives until she is killed by one. Shana is unsure to believe him and the three Flame Hazes fight with Yuji as he casts a black Seal. He traps Wilhelmina and Margery in a ball of silver and taunts Margery with information concerning The Silver, information she has strived and lived for. He explains to Margery that the Silver is a being that exists as a projection of one's emotions. At the time she witness everyone around get getting slaughtered by it, it was acting as a mirror of her hatred towards everyone who abused her, and did all the things Margery secretly wanted to do to them on her behalf. Yuji tells Margery the Silver did not kill those around her, she did. She has a mental breakdown and starts hysterically crying and screaming. Meanwhile, Yuji is chasing Shana and they fight. In the end, he captures her and goes to the Haridan with Shana unconscious in his arms. He takes the Haridan and claims it is his property. Yuji reveals to Yoshida, after she asks him, that he returned her letter back to let her know he chose Shana. She then falls on her knees in shock. Yuji flies to the Serei-den with Shana in his arms.
5 (53)	"Captured Flame Haze"; Transliteration: "Toraware no Fureimu-heizu" (Japanese: 囚われのフレイムヘイズ)	November 5, 2011
Shana is kept captive. Later on, she learns that Alastor has joined Yuji. Meanwhile, in our world, Margery is in a coma and Eita cannot wake her up, unless Satou comes back. Outlaw does not give any information or help to either Eita about Satou or Wilhelmina about Shana. Shana seems to be erased from everyone's memories and Wilhelmina refuses to help the Outlaw in the war until she finds Shana and that's why they will not help her either. Shana is afraid to face Yuji, and when he reaches out to touch her, she falls back, curling up on her side and crying in fear. Meanwhile, Lammy meets Shana again and the Trinity seem to have a secret plan.
6 (54)	"On the Palm of One's Hand"; Transliteration: "Tenohira no Naka ni" (Japanese: 掌のなかに)	November 12, 2011
Satou is held hostage by an Outlaw - Widened Eye of Incineration, Ernest Flieder, who believes that this way he will coerce Wilhelmina to join them in battle. His partner, the Scatterer of Sparkling Light, Rebecca Reed, frees Satou and sends him back to Margery Daw with Wilhelmina's reports. Rebecca flies to Wilhelmina, a long-time friend and ally, and Sophie Sawallisch makes Emest the commander of the Tokyo Outlaw Headquarters. Meanwhile, at the Serei-den, Shana wonders why she was so powerless Yuji and so scared of him when he tried to touch her. She remembers when her trainer, Shiro, told her that one day she will find the greatest power that can bring even a God upon its knees, then he asked to her to hold his hand. Shana then remembers how every enemy she fought, held hands with someone and she recognizes the greatest power of love that lies on the palm of Yuji's hand and understands what Shiro meant back then. Suddenly, there's a loud noise and upon investigation sees dead bodies and above them - the Master Throne, Hecate. Hecate declares that Shana is no longer needed.
7 (55)	"The Divine Gate"; Transliteration: "Shin Mon" (Japanese: 神門)	November 19, 2011
Hecate feels that Shana is a threat to them and should be killed, and proceeds to attack her. Shana, having limited options due to a treasure tool in the form of a wrist chain binding her power as a Flame Haze, throws a pillow at Hecate, who sets it on fire and inadvertently has it land outside on the balcony where Yuji can see it. Yuji comes to Shana's aid, expressing understanding to Hecate but forbidding her from harming Shana nonetheless. Meanwhile, Kazumi meets Khamsin, the Mover of Ceremonial Equipment, and asks him about the meaning behind the Treasure that Pheles gave her, since her feelings towards Yuji are changed after he rejected her. Back at the Serei-den, Yuji opens the Divine Gate, through which he intends to search for and retrieve the Snake of the Festival's true body and change the world. He then takes Shana and the Trinity with him to announce his plans to all Denizens as they prepare for the war. Then he, accompanied by the Trinity, go through the gate.
8 (56)	"Beginning of the War"; Transliteration: "Kaisen" (Japanese: 開戦)	November 26, 2011
As the war begins all over the world, Yuji, the Trinity and other Denizens are on the path to Snake of the Festival's self. All Flame Hazes prepare themselves for the war, Carmel goes into the sea to the fallen kingdom of Heavenly Palace and brings it out of the sea. Khamsin and Rebecca infiltrate the Serei-den and start attacking and destroying everything. Meanwhile, Shana is alone and powerless, when she notices what is going on and sees it as the chance to escape she has been waiting for.
9 (57)	"To the Serei-den"; Transliteration: "Serei-den Dono e" (Japanese: 星黎殿へ)	December 3, 2011
As the war continues, the castle holding Shana takes considerable damage, and when a blast traps her, she is unable to move for a short while. She gets up through sheer will alone, fighting her weakness as an ordinary human girl, and struggles her way to Nietono no Shana. Tenmoku Ikko reappears, slaying one Denizen after another as he tries to find his master Shana, and attacks Tempest Hoof Fecor. He finds Shana, breaks her free from the chain that sealed her powers and is finally ready to battle.
10 (58)	"Crossing Swords"; Transliteration: "Kōsaten" (Japanese: 交差点)	December 10, 2011
Sophie Sawallisch comes to assist with a large army of armed humans. Shana is freed and after a battle against a Denizen named Uvall, which ends up with Shana furiously killing Uvall, she comes to self-awareness as the ultimate combination of who she was before meeting Yuji, and who she was afterward, the Flame Haze and the human....The Flaming-Haired, Blazing-Eyed Hunter AND Shana, realizing they are both one and the same and thus finally reuniting her with herself.
11 (59)	"Heard Feelings"; Transliteration: "Kikoeru Omoi" (Japanese: 聞こえる、想い)	December 17, 2011
Satou comes back and awakens Margery and they confess their love to each other at last. She makes him as powerful as herself fearing that he would not survive being intimate with her. Meanwhile, at the Serei-den, Shana, Wilhelmina, Khamsin and Rebecca enter the Divine Gate to fight the Trinity and the Snake of the Festival. Outside the Gate, in a blizzard, the war is getting extremely intense—more and more Denizen troops are coming but they are losing against the Flame Hazes. Decarabia, comes to the surface and starts a powerful attack but Sophie Sawallisch finds him and kills him, using a large amount of her powers. After a moment of comfort that the most powerful enemy has been destroyed, the snow from the blizzard turns into Denizens, and the commander of the Western army Haborym arrives earlier than Sawallisch expected. Meanwhile in the Divine Gate, Sabrac stands to delay Shana's progress.
12 (60)	"The Words of an Oath"; Transliteration: "Chikai no Kotoba" (Japanese: 誓いの言葉)	December 24, 2011
Wilhelmina, Rebecca, and Khamsin begin a long and hard fight against Sabrac, which seems to be impossible to win. Shana leaves them and meets Snake of the Festival, who has awakened his true form, and promises him to fight him, make him the person he used to be and to live in a perfect world along with him. She has realized that the two personalities of her were not the Flame Haze and the person, but the one who would and the one who would not fight for the dream of a perfect life. However, both have one thing that assures the chance for this dream to be realized—the most powerful unrestricted spell, love. Shana says she will use the Heaven-and-Earth Sundering spell to kill the Snake of the Festival and the Bal Masque if she has to in order to defeat them.
13 (61)	"From Rift to Rift"; Transliteration: "Hazama e to Hazama Kara" (Japanese: 狭間へと、狭間から)	January 7, 2012
Inside of the Divine Gate, Sabrac falls, gazing at the greatness and sheer enormity of the Snake of the Festival in his true form. The Snake of the Festival then sends out a signal and starts moving towards the Divine Gate. After the signal is felt by everyone, Sophie Sawallisch attempts to destroy the Gate. At the last moment, Fecor protects it and dies from the power of the spell. Back in the Gate, Shana and Yuji are fighting. Because of a memory that vows between two people are sealed with a kiss on the lips, Shana makes to kiss Yuji on the cheek and falls just short, saying that is her vow and perhaps her vow/kiss designated for him will be given later. She is then taken away abruptly by the ghosts of the Flame Hazes and is brought outside of the Gate as it breaks and the Snake of the Festival comes out. All Denizens cheer and all Flame Hazes stand in astonishment and despair and amongst this, Shana recognizes this as a sound not of a fall, but of the start of a new battle.
14 (62)	"Declaration of the Grand Order"; Transliteration: "Taimei Senpu" (Japanese: 大命宣布)	January 14, 2012
The Flame Haze army retreats as the Snake of the Festival destroys their morale. He announces his plan to create a new world, a complete copy of ours, to be a paradise for Denizens and with Power of Existence flowing everywhere. Thus, all Denizens would leave the world and the Flame Hazes would stop fighting against them. After that, panic and chaos reigns among the Flame Hazes, who now do not have a purpose and the Denizens attack them. Sophie and François Auric try to ease the chaos but to no avail.
15 (63)	"Rout in the Rain"; Transliteration: "Uchū no Haisō" (Japanese: 雨中の敗走)	January 21, 2012
The Flame Haze army retreats to the Heavenly Palace with the help of one of the 4 Gods of Earth, and Margery Daw. Samuel Demantius sets up a decoy stalling the Denizens' advance and discovery of the Heavenly Palace. Flame Hazes: Chiara Toscana and Sale Habichtsburg, carry Shana and the gang as they fly away.
16 (64)	"To Battle, Once More"; Transliteration: "Futatabi Tatakai e" (Japanese: 再び、戦いへ)	January 29, 2012
The few surviving Flame Hazes: Shana, Margery, Khamsin, Wilhelmina, Rebecca, Chiara, Sale, and Sophie arrives at an airport to decide whether to continue the fight or not. Yuji Sakai said that the Seirei-Den will head to Northwest, towards Misaki City where he will start the creation of Xanadu.
17 (65)	"For Whose Sake?"; Transliteration: "Tagatameni" (Japanese: 誰が為に)	February 4, 2012
Shana makes it to New York, and meets up with the other Gods of Earth. They agree to help Shana fight, and she then explains the plan to them. Yuji visited Misaki City and found Kazumi Yoshida and Eita Tanaka with Ike and Ogata leaving when Kantaro comes home. Yuji came back to convince Yoshida to join him in building the new universe. While Yoshida, Tanaka, and Yuji walk around town, Yuji explains what he intends to do. After a while of lecturing and choosing one's destiny, Yoshida finally agrees to help him.
18 (66)	"Spiral of Conflict"; Transliteration: "Tōsō no Uzu" (Japanese: 闘争の渦)	February 11, 2012
Yoshida witnesses the commencement of the ceremony to form Xanadu. Lamis starts to operate the plan with Yoshida. Hecate's purpose is revealed as she is sacrificed to the Snake of the Festival. The three remaining Gods of the Earth move in to attack the army of Crimson Denizens that have arrived in Misaki City. This gives Shana and her companions an opportunity to reach the Serei-den. Shana and Yuji lock in their own confrontation as an array of battles surround them.
19 (67)	"What the Wind Calls"; Transliteration: "Kaze ga Yobu Mono" (Japanese: 彩飄が呼ぶもの)	February 18, 2012
While Shana and Yuji battle each other their own allies confront their enemies. Yoshida witnesses the carnage around her and finally accepts to use the Giralda to summon Pheles and prepared to sacrifice herself, although instead she survived. The three Gods fight alongside Shana whilst the mad scientist Dantalion prepares to finish ceremony for the creation of Xanadu. Johan awakens and have a brief conversation with Yuji, and in the end Pheles is finally reunited with Johan.
20 (68)	"The Egg of the World"; Transliteration: "Sekai no Tamago" (Japanese: 世界の卵)	February 25, 2012
With Johan freed from the Midnight Lost Child, Shana and her allies continue their fight against Yuji and the Crimson Denizens. The Flame Haze Earnest attempts to contact The Oracle through Rofocale who informs him that to summon the Oracle is impossible; at least until he has a vision which startles him. On the other hand, Shana's attacks brings out Yuji's very own unrestricted spell through Snake of the Festival. To the leader of Bal Masque's fear however, she manages to fire multiple Chorde into the egg of the New World, possibly damaging it.
21 (69)	"One Reason"; Transliteration: "Hitotsu no Ri" (Japanese: 一つの理)	March 3, 2012
Shana announces her own plans for the paradise Xanadu, which was to create a law where the Denziens are not allowed to eat humans anymore. Johan talk with Yoshida knowing that his life was coming to an end. Because of this, he formed a plan and also has a message for Wilhelmina from him and Pheles. The Hyakki Yakō van that Yoshida is in, being taken over and controlled, then being fired at and later exploding right in front of Shana and Yuji's very own eyes.
22 (70)	"Dream of the Stranger"; Transliteration: "Ihōjin no Yume" (Japanese: 異邦人の夢)	March 10, 2012
Yoshida and the Hyakki Yakō van create illusions to conceal their presence. Khamsin risk his life to protect Yoshida, Wilhelmina comes to assist them while Yoshida carries a glowing object given to her by Johan and Pheles. They hide within the tower as they disabled the controls. While avoiding the missiles, Sale grab and threw an explosive robot at the control room leading Dantalion to his death. Chiara defeats Crimson Lord Mammon when he got distracted by the destruction of the control room. Shana and Margery reveals their secret plan to Yuji.
23 (71)	"God's Dream"; Transliteration: "Kami no Yume" (Japanese: 神の夢)	March 17, 2012
Xanadu has been created, albeit with some slight changes. The Crimson God Shaher proclaims the existence of both worlds. Midnight comes, and the Midnight Lost Child activates, replenishing the Snake of the Festival's powers. Yuji has the chance to undo Shana's changes to his new world, but decides to let it stand, as the Denizens tell him they are willing to give up eating humans if they no longer need to. Snake of the Festival announces his new world for the Crimson Denizens and allow them to live there in peace. He parts with Yuji and they go their separate ways, when the Snake of the Festival makes note of his respect towards Yuji. Snake of the Festival says that the Flame Haze should rejoice now that the war is over. All remaining members of Bal Masqué leave for Xanadu except for Sydonay who stays behind willing to aid Yuji in his final confront against Shana, while Khamsin's friends gather around him to pay their respects to him before he dies. Kazumi promised to never forget him.
24 (72)	"The End in the Distance"; Transliteration: "Hate yori Hiraku" (Japanese: 涯てより開く)	March 24, 2012
Pheles and Johan's child, Justus, is entrusted to Wilhelmina, while a large group of Flame Haze is assembled at the Heavenly palace to depart to Xanadu with them. Lamis also sets for the Denizens' new world leaving to Yuji some Power of Existence he assembled and a restricted spell "Grammatica", whose properties "she" lets Yuji find out for himself. Only Shana, Yuji, Sydonay, Margery and Kazumi stay behind when the spell on Misaki City is lifted and the city starts moving again. Yuji reveals to the others that there is no duplicate of Misaki City in Xanadu, as he was unable to recreate it due to the role the city played in Xanadu's creation. Yuji asks Shana for Yukari Hirai's torch so he can restore her to existence. Shana refuses to agree with Yuji's intentions to leave her behind in astonishment and starts fighting him, while Margery goes full force against Sydonay. In the end, Yuji accepts Shana's feelings and Sydonay is killed, fulfilling his wish to rejoin Hecate in spirit. When Yuji and Shana kiss, the spell left by Lamis activates and Yuji becomes a real existence, no longer a Torch. Life returns to normal at Misaki City, including Yukari Hirai being restored, and Kantaro and Chigusa's child (Miyu Sakai) is born. Yuji and Shana depart for Xanadu together.

== Specials ==
=== Season 1 specials (2006–07) ===
No.	Title	Original release date
1	"Shakugan no Shana-tan"; Transliteration: "Shakugan no Shana-tan" (Japanese: 灼眼のシャナたん)	January 25, 2006
Various scenes are shown with the premise of Shana being very tiny and often riding on Yuji's head while eating melon bread or in one scene, sharpening Nietono no Shana.
2	"Shakugan no Shana-tan Returns"; Transliteration: "Shakugan no Shana-tan Ritānzu" (Japanese: 灼眼のシャナたん りたーんず)	May 25, 2006
Various critical scenes from the first anime series are portrayed with Shana being very tiny.
3	"The Supreme Hecate-tan"; Transliteration: "Itadaki no Hekate-tan" (Japanese: 頂のヘカテーたん)	October 1, 2006
Various scenes from the anime involving Hecate are shown except now both Shana and Hecate are very tiny. There are also some scenes original to this special.
4	"The Sovereign Carmel-san"; Transliteration: "Banjō no Carmel-san" (Japanese: バンジョウのカルメルさん)	April 4, 2007
The beginning contains an advertisement for the Shakugan no Shana movie. A short scene follows with Wilhelmina Carmel standing on the edge of a cliff overlooking the sea where she comments on her being absent in the film. After this scene comes a similar one where Wilhelmina reveals that the second season anime series is currently in production.
5	"Shakugan no Shana-tan The Movie"; Transliteration: "Gekijō-ban Shakugan no Shana-tan" (Japanese: 劇場版 灼眼のシャナたん)	April 21, 2007
Various memorable scenes taken from the film Shakugan no Shana remade and retold to more laughable and fun moments.

=== Second specials (2008–09) ===
No.	Title	Original release date
1	"Shakugan no Shana-tan Begins"; Transliteration: "Shakugan no Shana-tan Biginzu" (Japanese: 灼眼のシャナたん びぎんず)	January 25, 2008
Various scenes relating the opening scenes between episodes one and three of Shakugan no Shana Second are shown.
2	"Shakugan no Shana-tan & Yoshida: Fumina Konoe Strikes Back"; Transliteration: "Shakugan no Shana-tan & Yoshida -Konoe Fumina Gyakushū-" (Japanese: 灼眼のシャナたん&吉田-近衛史菜の逆襲-)	May 23, 2008
Various scenes between the Fumina Konoe arc until the end in Shakugan no Shana Second are shown, this time featuring Fumina Konoe.
3	"Shakugan no Shana-tan Revenge"; Transliteration: "Shakugan no Shana-tan Rebenji" (Japanese: 灼眼のシャナたん れべんじ)	October 18, 2009
Various references to J.C.Staff's other anime (Hayate the Combat Butler!!, A Certain Magical Index and Toradora!). Several scenes from Shakugan no Shana Second are also featured, as well as a cameo by an equally small Index.

=== S specials (2009–10) ===
No.	Title	Original release date
1	"Shakugan no Shana-tan G"; Transliteration: "Shakugan no Shana-tan G" (Japanese: 灼眼のシャナたん G)	October 23, 2009
Various scenes from the first Shakugan no Shana S episode with the premise that the body switch also transfers Shana's very tiny stature to Yuji. A refresher course on the Hougu is also included.
2	"Shakugan no Shana-tan Dos"; Transliteration: "Shakugan no Shana-tan Dos" (Japanese: 灼眼のシャナたん Dos)	February 26, 2010
Various scenes from the second Shakugan no Shana S episode, but also includes exaggerated situations such as Wilhelmina appearing in a talk show and Yuji picking up a doll that looks like Shana.
3	"Shakugan no Shana-tan Tri"; Transliteration: "Shakugan no Shana-tan Tri" (Japanese: 灼眼のシャナたん Tri)	June 26, 2010
While Shana-tan discusses and scolds the class, Keisaku and Eita imagine themselves as thugs of justice during the old days.
4	"Shakugan no Shana-tan Frontier"; Transliteration: "Shakugan no Shana-tan Frontier" (Japanese: 灼眼のシャナたん Frontier)	September 29, 2010
Divided into several segments. In one segment, Shana-tan meets up with Yukio after she kicks Alastor off to the distance. In another segment, referencing Dokonjō Gaeru, Shana figures in an accident with Yuji and becomes part of his shirt. The two then hang out at a sushi bar where Kazumi works.

=== Final specials (2012) ===
No.	Title	Original release date
1	"Shakugan no Shana-tan Final Destruction 1"; Transliteration: "Shakugan no Shana-tan Final Destruction 1" (Japanese: 灼眼のシャナたん Final Destruction 1)	January 27, 2012
Various scenes from the earlier episodes ofShakugan no Shana Final are shown, complete with flashbacks from previous shorts. It also has added scenes, with some having references to anime series, such as Dragon Ball Z. Finally, it contains some explanations regarding on some terms used in the series, such as Divine Gate and Maelstrom of Conflict.
2	"Shakugan no Shana-tan Final Destruction 2"; Transliteration: "Shakugan no Shana-tan Final Destruction 2" (Japanese: 灼眼のシャナたん Final Destruction 2)	May 30, 2012
Various scenes between the Sereiden battle and Misaki City final battle arcs of Shakugan no Shana Final are shown, with some scenes altered such as the return of Hecate-tan. Just like the previous short, it also contains some explanations regarding on some terms used in the series, such as Xanadu, which Shana-tan mistakenly explains as a video game.
