= Sakura-Con =

Anime convention in Seattle, Washington

Coordinates: 47°36′41″N 122°19′58″W

- Sakura-Con logo.

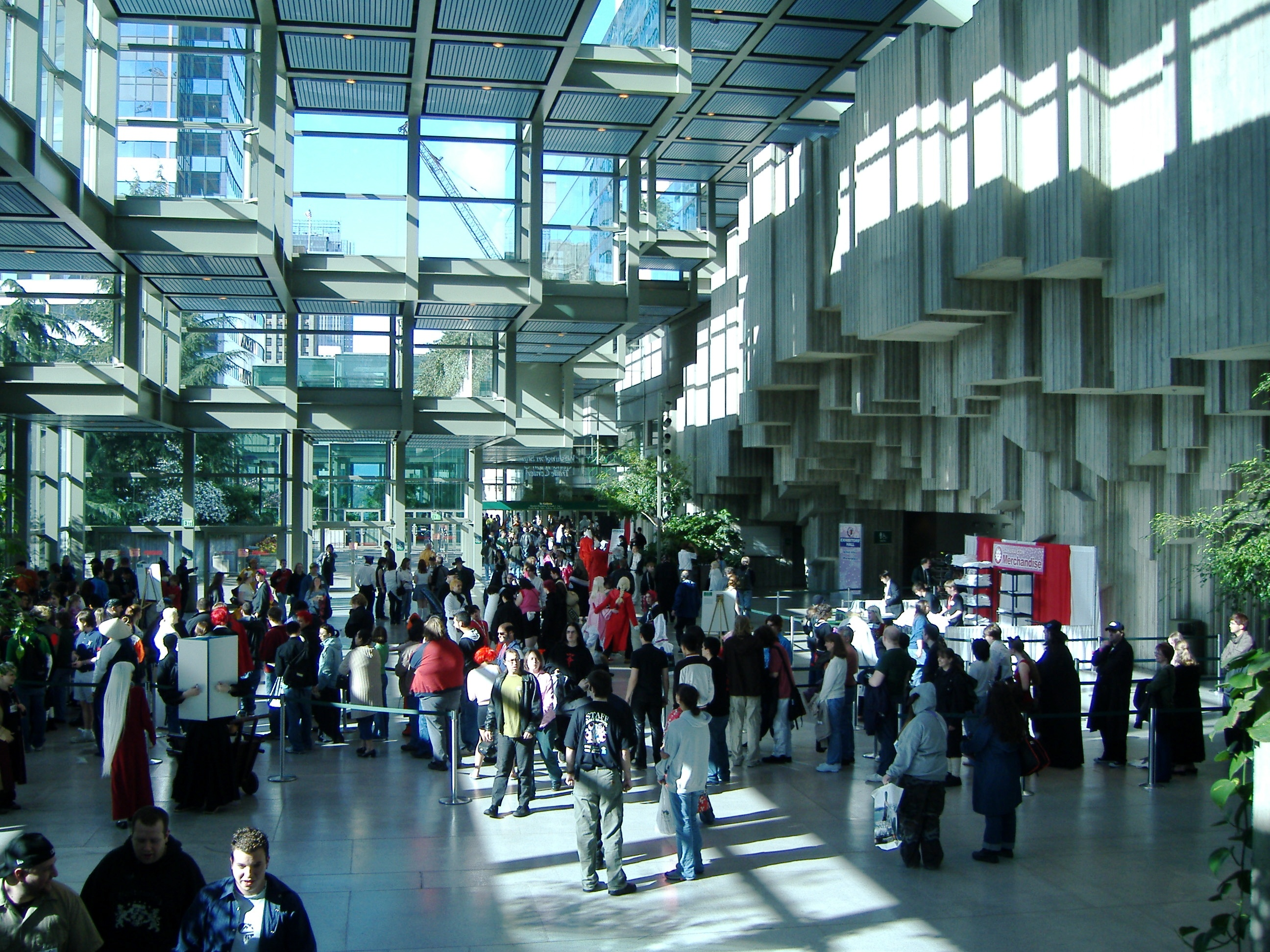
- Sakura-Con in 2006
- Status: Active
- Genre: Anime; Manga; Gaming
- Venue: Seattle Convention Center
- Location: Seattle, Washington
- Country: United States
- Inaugurated: 1998
- Attendance: 25,000 (est) in 2017
- Organizer: Asia-Northwest Cultural Education Association (ANCEA)
- Filing status: 501(c)(3)
- Website: www.sakuracon.org

Sakura-Con is an annual three-day anime convention held during March or April at the Seattle Convention Center in Seattle, Washington, United States. The convention, which is traditionally held over Easter weekend, is the largest anime convention in the Northwest. It is organized by the volunteer Asia-Northwest Cultural Education Association (ANCEA).

== Programming ==
The convention primarily showcases interactive activities related to the culture of Asian countries, most frequently Japan. Typical activities include panels hosted by enthusiasts and industry professionals, live game shows, an anime music video contest, an art show, artist alley, dances/raves, collectible card gaming, cosplay chess, cosplay contests, an exhibitors hall with both independent and corporate booths, a fashion show, Japanese cultural and presentations (aikido demonstrations, kabuki performances, kendama play, kendo swordsmanship, taiko drumming, tea ceremonies), Japanese pop and rock concerts, karaoke, masquerade ball, panels, table top RPG gaming, video gaming (arcade, console, PC), 24-hour video theaters. The convention runs programming for 24 hours a day.

In 2002 the charity auction benefited the Make-A-Wish Foundation and raised $4,560. The 2010 charity auction also benefiting the Make-A-Wish Foundation raised $27,000. The convention before holding fundraisers at the 2012 event raised $90,000 for tsunami relief. The 2015 charity auction benefited the Make-A-Wish Foundation and raised over $40,000. In 2016, a blood drive was held for Bloodworks Northwest.

== History ==
Sakura-Con's roots are from within the local science fiction convention community. A number of anime fans, including Daniel Harrison, decided that there was not enough anime content represented at conventions such as Norwescon, hatched the plan for an anime convention in a Tacoma, Washington comic book shop. Originally named Baka!-Con, (baka or ばか is Japanese for idiot,) the first convention was held at the Double Tree Inn in Tukwila, Washington in 1998. In 2000, Baka!-Con changed its name to Sakura-Con, (sakura or 桜 (alternately: さくら) is Japanese for cherry blossom).

In 2002 the convention utilized 70 percent of the convention space at the Seattle Airport Hilton & Conference Center along with having county representatives and the local Japanese Consulate General speak at opening ceremonies. Several guests canceled appearances in 2003, Yoko Ishida and Maria Yamamoto due to Pioneer company policy on traveling during international strife, and Akitaro Daichi and Atsushi Okuda. The 2004 convention had a warm body attendance cap of 4,500 people. In 2005 Sakura-Con had to limit its attendance to 5,100 and turned people away, resulting in the convention's move to the Washington State Convention & Trade Center.

The event ran for over 55 hours in 2007 and had 1,200 hours of programming, with only about half the attendees being from the Seattle area. Tatsunori Konno, the CEO of Bandai Visual USA, was heavily questioned about the company's pricing policies during their 2007 panel. In 2009 the event included five concerts, three dances, a large gaming area, seven theaters, and over 1,000 hours of programming. Registration line waits of three hours or more occurred due to the convention's growth. Sakura-Con in 2009 brought an estimated $13 million to the Seattle economy.

The convention covered six floors in 2010 and included six gaming rooms, seven panel rooms, and five video rooms. At the opening ceremonies a wedding proposal occurred between two staff members. The Dazzle Vision and High and Mighty Color concert had over 4,000 attendees. Exist Trace's concert in 2011 drew over 3,000 attendees. Before the 2012 convention around 12,000 attendees pre-registered. Sakura-Con 2013 had the second largest impact of area conventions, adding $19 million to the local economy. During the 2014 convention a cosplayer was held up at the nearby Freeway Park. Sakura-Con was cancelled in 2020 and 2021 due to the COVID-19 pandemic in Washington.

The Cheesecake Factory at the Seattle Convention Center caught fire during Sakura-Con 2025, which caused the Artist Alley to have a delayed opening.

=== Event history ===
Dates	Location	Attendance	Guests
April 24–26, 1998	Double Tree Inn; Tukwila, Washington	313	Tony Butler, Bruce Duffy, Dr. Antonia Levi, Stu Levy, Sam Liebowietz, Neil Nadelman, and Ron Scovil.
April 23–25, 1999	Double Tree Inn; Tukwila, Washington	553	Yushin Daiko, Tiffany Grant, Tristan MacAvery, and Stan Sakai.
March 31 – April 2, 2000	Double Tree Inn; Tukwila, Washington	866	Yushin Daiko, Sandy Fox, Tiffany Grant, Lex Lang, Dr. Antonia Levi, Tristan MacAvery, Doug Smith, and Taka Koto Ensemble.
April 27–29, 2001	Holiday Inn and Convention Center; Everett, Washington	1,519	Steve Bennett, Hiroki Hayashi, Mitsutaka Iguchi, Pamela Lauer, Dr. Antonia Levi, Mary Ohno & The Kabuki Academy, Lorraine Reyes, Lia Sargent, and Taka Koto Ensemble.
April 26–28, 2002	Seattle Airport Hilton & Conference Center; Seattle, Washington	2,328	Johnny Yong Bosch, Jessica Calvello, Pamela Lauer, Dr. Antonia Levi, Hiroshi Nagahama, Norio Shioyama, Tsunami Taiko, and Masakazu Yonemura.
April 4–6, 2003	Seattle Airport Hilton & Conference Center; Seattle, Washington	3,023	Fred Gallagher, Hilary Haag, Yukio Kikukawa, Hiroshi Nagahama, Michelle Ruff, Susumu Sakurai, Hidakazu Shimamura, and Yoshinobu Yamakawa.
April 23–25, 2004	Seattle Airport Hilton & Sea-Tac Marriott Hotel; Seattle, Washington	4,775	Yoshitoshi ABe, Colleen Clinkenbeard, Akitaroh Daichi, Michael Dobson, Fred Gallagher, Jerry Holkins, Hiroki Kikuta, Mike Krahulik, Scott McNeil, Hiroshi Nagahama, Monica Rial, Kaeko Sakamoto, Run Sasaki, Eric P. Sherman, Hiroko "hiro" Shimabukuro, Yasuyuki Ueda, and Yoshihiko Umakoshi.
April 8–10, 2005	Seattle Airport Hilton & Sea-Tac Marriott Hotel; Seattle, Washington	4,745	Angela, Tom Bateman, Greg Dean, Jerry Holkins, Kumiko Kato, Hiroki Kikuta, Mike Krahulik, Hiroshi Nagahama, Ikue Ohtani, Run Sasaki, Tatsuo Sato, Travis Willingham, and Tommy Yune.
March 24–26, 2006	Washington State Convention & Trade Center; Seattle, Washington	8,300	The 404s, Katie Bair, Ippongi Bang, Jessica Boone, Camino, Fred Gallagher, Michael Gluck, Jerry Holkins, Takanori Hoshino, Takahiro Kimura, Mike Krahulik, Hideyuki Kurata, Tony Oliver, Run Sasaki, Stephanie Sheh, Goro Taniguchi, David Vincent, and David L. Williams.
April 6–8, 2007	Washington State Convention & Trade Center; Seattle, Washington	11,000	A-Key Kyo, Colleen Clinkenbeard, Akitaroh Daichi, Michael Gluck, K.T. Gray, Shawn Handyside, Kouta Hirano, Jerry Holkins, Jeph Jacques, Kyle Jones, Jonathan Klein, Mike Krahulik, Hideyuki Kurata, Jason Liebrecht, LiN Clover, Sam Logan, Vic Mignogna, Move, Hiroshi Nagahama, Kaori Nazuka, Yasuhiro Nightow, Liam O'Brien, Monica Rial, Rooster Teeth Productions, Carrie Savage, Sumi Shimamoto, Doug Smith, Spike Spencer, John Swasey, and Toshifumi Yoshida.
March 28–30, 2008	Washington State Convention & Trade Center; Seattle, Washington	13,600	Ali Project, J.L. Anderson, Robby Bevard, Caitlin Glass, Brandon Graham, Todd Haberkorn, Wes Hartman, Jerry Holkins, Yutaka Izubuchi, Yuna Kagesaki, Toshihiro Kawamoto, Roland Kelts, ketchup mania, Hiroki Kikuta, Mike Krahulik, M. Alice LeGrow, Vic Mignogna, Jake Myler, Hiroshi Nagahama, Joshua Ortega, Brina Palencia, Steve Prince, Scandal, Yuji Shiozaki, The Slants, and Nobuteru Yuuki.
April 10–12, 2009	Washington State Convention & Trade Center; Seattle, Washington	16,586	Yoshitoshi ABe, Leah Clark, Greg Dean, Aaron Dismuke, Peter Fernandez, Girugamesh, Todd Haberkorn, Shawn Handyside, Hangry & Angry, Jerry Holkins, Roland Kelts, Jonathan Klein, Mike Krahulik, Joel McDonald, Myuji, Sasaki Nozomu, Hideo Okamoto, Wendy Powell, The Slants, Smile.dk, Soul Candy, David Stanworth, J. Michael Tatum, and Kappei Yamaguchi.
April 2–4, 2010	Washington State Convention & Trade Center; Seattle, Washington	18,002	Troy Baker, Luci Christian, Dazzle Vision, Richard Epcar, Todd Haberkorn, High and Mighty Color, Ryo Horikawa, The Hsu-nami, Yasuhiro Imagawa, Noizi Ito, Mai Kadowaki, Vic Mignogna, Yutaka Minowa, Lika Morinaga, Satoshi Nishimura, Tsuyoshi Nonaka, Brina Palencia, Chris Patton, Wendy Powell, Soul Candy, Kent Williams, and Takahiro Yoshimatsu.
April 22–24, 2011	Washington State Convention & Trade Center; Seattle, Washington	19,040	6%Dokidoki, Berryz Kobo, Chris Bevins, DJ Blade, Chris Cason, Jo Chen, Cynthia Cranz, Exist Trace, Tiffany Grant, Clarine Harp, Roland Kelts, Kotono Mitsuishi, Daisuke Moriyama, Cassandra Lee Morris, Tony Oliver, Wendy Powell, DJ Rize, DJ Saiyan, Stephanie Sheh, Michael Sinterniklaas, Sixh., Spunk Da Bunny, Atsushi Suzumi, Jason Thompson, Cristina Vee, and Vofan.
April 6–8, 2012	Washington State Convention & Trade Center; Seattle, Washington	21,457	Steve Blum, Leah Clark, Todd Haberkorn, Clarine Harp, Naoto Hirooka, Atsuhiro Iwakami, Fumiko Kawamura, Jonathan Klein, Reuben Langdon, Jamie Marchi, Yutaka Minowa, Katsushi Ota, Christopher Sabat, Stereopony, Michihiko Suwa, Retsu Tateo, Gen Urobuchi, Kanon Wakeshima, Kawajiri Yoshiaki, and Zekkyō.
March 29–31, 2013	Washington State Convention & Trade Center; Seattle, Washington	21,000 (est)	Eir Aoi, Ayumi Fujimura, Gashicon, Luna Haruna, Atsuko Ishizuka, Reki Kawahara, Toshihiro Kawamoto, Vic Mignogna, Katsuyuki Motohiro, Bryce Papenbrook, Stephanie Sheh, Naoyoshi Shiotani, John Swasey, and Joji Wada.
April 18–20, 2014	Washington State Convention & Trade Center; Seattle, Washington	23,103	Shingo Adachi, Toshifumi Akai, Kyoji Asano, Leah Clark, Elisa, Todd Haberkorn, Chuck Huber, Yui Ishikawa, Tomohiko Ito, Erik Scott Kimerer, Tetsuya Kinoshita, Mami Koyama, Maki, Koji Masunari, Erica Mendez, Matthew Mercer, Mint, Range Murata, Hiroshi Nagahama, Tetsuya Nakatake, Koichi Ohata, RinRin Doll, Shigehiko Sato, Patrick Seitz, and Christopher Corey Smith.
April 3–5, 2015	Washington State Convention & Trade Center; Seattle, Washington	23,419	Masaki Asai (APSY), Chris Bevins, Johnny Yong Bosch, Kotomi Deai, GARNiDELiA, Naoto Hirooka, Arifumi Imai, Kanako Ito, Shinichiro Kashiwada, Hiromi Kato, Katsuhiko Kitada, Osamu Kobayashi, Kanako Kondo, Yoshitsugu Matsuoka, Vic Mignogna, Toshimichi Mori, Bryce Papenbrook, Rachel Robinson, Sumi Shimamoto, Haruka Terui, Kana Ueda, David Vincent, Makoto "Max" Watanabe.
March 25–27, 2016	Washington State Convention & Trade Center; Seattle, Washington	23,000 (est)	Aaron Dismuke, Kyle Hebert, Natalie Rose Hoover, Chuck Huber, Masashi Ishihama, Shinichiro Kashiwada, Reki Kawahara, Toshihiro Kawamoto, Jonathan Klein, Shigeto Koyama, Reuben Langdon, Kazuma Miki, Ian Sinclair, Micah Solusod, J. Michael Tatum, Joji Wada, Takahiro Yoshimatsu, and Band-Maid.
April 14–16, 2017	Washington State Convention Center; Seattle, Washington	25,000 (est)	Takanori Aki, Johnny Yong Bosch, Kira Buckland, Christine Marie Cabanos, Aaron Dismuke, Megan Emerick, Caitlin Glass, Todd Haberkorn, Natalie Rose Hoover, Yasuhiro Irie, Chikashi Kubota, Erica Lindbeck, Erica Mendez, Matthew Mercer, Vic Mignogna, Hiroshi Nagahama, Christopher Sabat, Patrick Seitz, Kenichi Sonoda, and Gen Urobuchi.
March 30 - April 1, 2018	Washington State Convention Center; Seattle, Washington	24,000	Ray Chase, Leah Clark, Robbie Daymond, M-Project, Mana, Takanori Matsuoka, Joel McDonald, Mint, Max Mittelman, Okamoto's, Rumi Okubo, Chiharu Sawashiro, Shigefumi Shingaki, Yosuke Shiokawa, Ian Sinclair, Micah Solusod, John Swasey, and Mamoru Yokota.
April 19–21, 2019	Washington State Convention Center; Seattle, Washington		Justin Briner, Erika Harlacher, Cherami Leigh, Erica Lindbeck, Jamie Marchi, Yutaka Minowa, Hiroshi Nagahama, Hideo Okamoto, Tony Oliver, Monica Rial, ROOKiEZ is PUNK'D, Ryukishi07, Satoshi Shiki, Ian Sinclair, Goro Taniguchi, Alexis Tipton, Cristina Vee, David Vincent, and Kari Wahlgren.
April 15-17, 2022	Washington State Convention Center; Seattle, Washington	25,000	Steve Blum, Johnny Yong Bosch, Ray Chase, Robbie Daymond, Brittney Karbowski, Wendee Lee, Kyle McCarley, Kristen McGuire, Erica Mendez, Mint, Max Mittelman, Cassandra Lee Morris, ROOKiEZ is PUNK'D, Tara Sands, Keith Silverstein, and Ian Sinclair.
April 7-9, 2023	Seattle Convention Center; Seattle, Washington		Griffin Burns, Leah Clark, Kôhei Eguchi, Junya Enoki, Richard Epcar, Flow, Katelyn Gault, Junichi Hayama, Shintaro Inokawa, Hisashi Kagawa, Erica Lindbeck, Mike McFarland, Mint, Xander Mobus, Kenji Muto, Queen Bee, Aaron Roberts, Erica Schroeder, Ellyn Stern, Cristina Vee, Kiyotaka Waki, and Yoshihiro Watanabe.
March 29-31, 2024	Seattle Convention Center; Seattle, Washington	30,500	Leah Clark, Khoi Dao, Aaron Dismuke, Naoto Hirooka, Shigeto Koyama, Alex Organ, Anairis Quiñones, Lindsay Seidel, Megan Shipman, Laura Stahl, Rie Tanaka, Austin Tindle, Natalie Van Sistine, Hiromi Wakabayashi, and Howard Wang.
April 18-20, 2025	Seattle Convention Center; Seattle, Washington		Sally Amaki, Dameon Clarke, Jordan Dash Cruz, Lucien Dodge, Damien Haas, Naoto Hirooka, Amanda "AmaLee" Lee, Erica Lindbeck, Emi Lo, Brandon McInnis, Erica Mendez, Xander Mobus, Casey Mongillo, Trina Nishimura, Oriana Perón, Reol, Ian Sinclair, Sonny Strait, J. Michael Tatum, Sora Tokui, Abby Trott, and Shimba Tsuchiya.
April 3-5, 2026	Seattle Convention Center; Seattle, Washington		Blue Encount, Bill Butts, Jordan Dash Cruz, Kelsey Cruz, Chris Hackney, Jill Harris, Brittney Karbowski, Lauren Landa, Faye Mata, David Matranga, Kristen McGuire, Cassandra Lee Morris, Hiroshi Nagahama, Emi Nitta, Oriana Perón, Lisa Reimold, Mallorie Rodak, Masako Sato, Scandal, Sonny Strait, Kari Wahlgren, and Yoshihiro Watanabe.

== ANCEA ==
The Asia-Northwest Cultural Education Association (Sakura-Con organizers) were given the Foreign Minister's Award from Japan on May 30, 2012. The award was given at the residence of the Japanese Consul General Kiyokazu Ota.

== Collaborations ==
Sakura-Con in 2013 returned to host the Anime Costume Contest at Dragon Fest 2013 in Seattle, Washington's Chinatown for the fourth time.
