= Sasakura =

Sasakura (written: 笹倉) is a Japanese surname. Notable people with the surname include:

- Ayato Sasakura (笹倉 綾人), Japanese manga artist
- Yasutaka Sasakura (笹倉 康誉, born 1988), Japanese rugby union player

== Fictional characters ==
- Ryū Sasakura (佐々倉 溜), protagonist of the manga series Bartender
- Towa Sasakura (笹倉 永久), a character in the anime film The Sky Crawlers
- Yoko Sasakura (笹倉 葉子), a character in the manga series School Rumble
