= Kimi no Nagori wa Shizuka ni Yurete =

2010 video game

- Developer(s): Unisonshift: Blossom
- Publisher(s): Unisonshift
- Artist(s): Noizi Ito; Ayato Sasakura; Pero
- Writer(s): Tamaki Ichikawa; Bonanza Kazama
- Composer(s): Ryō Mizutsuki
- Platform(s): Microsoft Windows
- Release: JP: May 28, 2010
- Genre(s): Eroge, visual novel
- Mode(s): Single-player

Kimi no Nagori wa Shizuka ni Yurete (君の名残は静かに揺れて, lit. Traces of You Trembling Quietly), abbreviated as Kiminago (きみなご), is an adult Japanese visual novel developed by Unisonshift: Blossom for Windows. It was released on May 28, 2010. Kimi no Nagori wa Shizuka ni Yurete's story is focused around Mayuri Shirasagi, one of the heroines of Unisonshift Blossom's previous game, Flyable Heart. The game carries the tagline of "Flyable Heart If that Time".

== Plot ==
=== Setting ===
The story of Kimi no Nagori wa Shizuka ni Yurete is set in the private Ōtoriryōran Academy (鳳繚蘭学園, Ōtoriryōran Gakuen), the same academy that the story of Flyable Heart is set in. Entry into the institution requires a background check as well as a difficult examination. Those that are qualified have all their expenses such as tuition and living costs written off.

=== Characters ===
The player takes on the role of Syo Katsuragi (葛木 晶, Katsuragi Shō), the protagonist of Kimi no Nagori wa Shizuka ni Yurete. Syo has recently transferred into the private Ōtoriryōran Academy. Mayuri Shirasagi (白鷺 茉百合, Shirasagi Mayuri; voiced by: Chisato Suzumori) holds the position of vice president of the student council at Ōtoriryōran Academy. Her popularity at the academy is like that of an idol. Mayuri has excellent grades and performs well in sports as well. Mayuri has three older sisters. Sayuri Shirasagi (白鷺 小百合, Shirasagi Sayuri; voiced by: Mayumi Shindō) is Mayuri's eldest sister. As she has a weak body, she is often resting in her room. Kaori Nishikikoji (錦小路霞織, Nishikikōji Kaori; voiced by: Kagetsu Suzune) is Mayuri's second sister. Shiori Shirasagi (白鷺 詩織, Shirasagi Shiori; voiced by: Miu Aoi) is Mayuri's third sister. She was married but has since divorced and has now returned home. Tomoe Shirasagi (白鷺 巴, Shirasagi Tomoe) is Mayuri's grandmother and the head of the Shirasagi family. Toshihiko Shirasagi (白鷺 利彦, Shirasagi Toshihiko) is Sayuri's husband. He does not hold a lot of authority in the Shirasagi household though he actually often takes on the tasks assigned by Tomoe due to his wife's weak body.

=== Story ===
The story of Kimi no Nagori wa Shizuka ni Yurete is centered on Mayuri Shirasagi, one of the heroines in Flyable Heart. The story is based on the supposition of what would happen if the events of Flyable Heart took a different turn.

== Development ==
Kimi no Nagori wa Shizuka ni Yurete is Unison Shift's fourth project, after Flyable Heart. The scenario of the game was written by Tamaki Ichikawa and Bonanza Kazama. The illustrations were provided by Noizi Ito, Ayato Sasakura, and Pero. The writers, artists, and composer were all part of the Flyable Heart production team.

=== Release history ===
Kimi no Nagori wa Shizuka ni Yurete was declared gold on May 8, 2010, and was released on May 28, 2010 in both limited and regular editions. A netbook featuring Mayuri Shirasagi was confirmed to be in production after over 100 participants stated in an online survey that they wanted such an item. Those that stated their interest in the survey was contacted first with orders opening up to the general public through the Faith electronics store on April 26, 2010 to May 10, 2010 although they were originally not going to take anymore orders after April 30, 2010. The netbook was priced at 64,980 yen (tax inclusive).

== Music ==
The music of Kimi no Nagori wa Shizuka ni Yurete was composed by Ryō Mizutsuki. The theme song is named "solitude" and is sung by Kiyo.
