= Peace@Pieces =

2004 video game

- Developer: Unisonshift
- Publisher: Unisonshift
- Platform: Windows
- Release: JP: December 23, 2004
- Genres: Eroge, Visual novel
- Mode: Single-player

Peace@Pieces (ピースアピーシーズ, Pīsu a Pīshīzu) is a Japanese adult visual novel developed by Unisonshift and was released on December 23, 2004, for Windows. The game was described by the development team as a "sweet school romance comedy with lewd moe situation adventure" (学園恋愛甘甘コメディ萌シチュエーションえっちあどべんちゃー, Gakuen ren'ai ama ama komedi moe shichuēshon ecchi adobenchā). The gameplay in Peace@Pieces follows a linear plot line, which offers pre-determined scenarios and courses of interaction, and focuses on the appeal of the main female characters.

== Development ==
Peace@Pieces was the tenth project developed by Unisonshift, and is developed as an adult game much like previous titles such as Innocent Eye's. Planning for the game was headed by @Pieces. Art direction and character designs were provided by Noizi Ito, known for her work on Shakugan no Shana, the Haruhi Suzumiya franchise, and the later Nanatsuiro Drops. The scenario was provided solely by Tamaki Ichikawa. Music in the game was solely composed by Ryō Mizutsuki, known for her later contributions on BaseSon's Koihime Musō, and Key Sounds Label's Piano no Mori.

=== Release history ===
Peace@Pieces was first introduced to the public on December 23, 2004, as a DVD-ROM playable on only a Microsoft Windows PC, and was subsequently followed by a fan disc, titled One More@Pieces, released on August 9, 2005. It was later followed by a second release, titled Peace@Pieces + One More@Pieces Special Memorial Edition, released on November 22, 2007, containing the game itself and the fan disc.
