= Nikori Yamaguchi =

Japanese shogi player

- Native name: 山口仁子梨
- Born: September 17, 2002 (age 23)
- Hometown: Gifu, Gifu Prefecture, Japan

Career
- Achieved professional status: October 1, 2019 (aged 17)
- Badge Number: W-68
- Rank: Women's 1-kyū
- Teacher: Shōdo Nakada (7-dan)

Websites
- JSA profile page

Nikori Yamaguchi (山口 仁子梨, Yamaguchi Nikori; born September 17, 2002) is a Japanese women's professional shogi player ranked 1-kyū.

== Women's shogi professional ==
=== Promotion history ===
Yamaguchi's promotion history is as follows:

- 2-kyū: October 1, 2019
- 1-kyū: July 2, 2024

Note: All ranks are women's professional ranks.

== Personal life ==
Nikori's younger sister Kirari is also a women's professional shogi player. The two are the fifth pair of sisters to become women's professionals.
