= Kirari (Dazzle Vision song) =

Promotional single by Dazzle Vision

from the album Kirari
- Released: April 14, 2011
- Recorded: 2011
- Genre: Screamo, hard rock
- Length: 5:07
- Label: Human Noise Records
- Songwriter(s): Maiko
- Producer(s): Tower Records Japan

"Kirari"
A 40 second sample of the song.

"Kirari" (alternative title in English: "Charity") is a song by Japanese screamo band Dazzle Vision. It was released on April 14, 2011 as the first promotional single their fifth studio album, Kirari. It was produced by Tower Records. A music video for the song was shot for the song. It was released on April 14, 2012, the same day as the song was released on iTunes Store Japan.

== Style and concept ==
Kirari opens up the album. It is often described as a gut wrenching power ballad with screamo undertones and heavy riffs not typical of the usual power ballad. Throughout the song it bounces between an Alternative Metal and a Thrash Metal vibe with softer periods. Kirari showcases the softer side of Dazzle Vision much like their previous album Crystal Children, clashing pop and rock into tunes such as Continue and Divided. The entire concept of the song is both symbolizes the rebirth of the band but the anger about the band's relationship with the Japanese music industry.

== Music video ==
The music video for Kirari was released on April 14, 2012, the same day as the song. It was produced and directed by Human Noise Records.
