= Ayato Sasakura =

Japanese manga artist

- 笹倉綾人
- Occupation: manga artist
- Notable work: Shakugan no Shana

Ayato Sasakura (笹倉綾人, Sasakura Ayato; born January 19) is a Japanese manga artist. She is best known for her work as the artist for the Shakugan no Shana manga series.

Ayato Sasakura has been active on the dōjin scene for several years under the kojin circle name Imitation Genome, and was part of several other circles before that. Since 2002, she has contributed a number of short manga to the lolicon-themed adult magazines Hina Kan and Hina Kan Hi!, which were collected in tankōbon form under the title Shōjo-ryū kōfuku kakushu-ron ("On the seizure of happiness, girly style"). Those magazines were supplanted by Comic RIN, where Sasakura continues to publish, albeit on an irregular basis.

A full-page illustration of hers was featured in Dengeki Moeoh 5 (May 2003), and caught the attention of the editor in charge of the Shakugan no Shana manga adaptation project. Her style seemed to fit Noizi Ito's and that's how she was appointed as the artist for the Shana manga, starting from February 2005.

== Works ==
- Shōjo-ryū kōfuku kakushu-ron (少女流幸福攫取論, 2004, Akane Shinsha, ISBN 4-87182-678-3).
- Shakugan no Shana (灼眼のシャナ, 2005–, Media Works), manga currently serialized in Dengeki Daioh.
- Flyable Heart (2009)
- Kimi no Nagori wa Shizuka ni Yurete (2009)
