= Shocking Loud Voice =

Greatest hits album by Dazzle Vision
- Released: May 4, 2012
- Recorded: 2012
- Length: 37:23
- Label: Human Noise

Singles from Shocking Loud Voice
- 1. "セカンド (The Second)" Released: March 31, 2012

Shocking Loud Voice is a compilation by Japanese band Dazzle Vision. Released on May 4, 2012.

== Music videos ==
On March 31, 2012, Dazzle Vision would release the music video for "The Second" on both their official website and YouTube.

== Track listing ==
No.	Title	Length
1.	"セカンド (The Second)"	3:44
2.	"Child be found of... (Remix)"	3:26
3.	"空迫 (Live)"	3:33
4.	"VISION (Remastering)"	3:16
5.	"HERE (Remix)"	3:43
6.	"left to cry here (Remix)"	4:03
7.	"Take my hand"	4:55
8.	"Eternity (Remix)"	3:29
9.	"Miss Cinderella (Remastering)"	3:33
10.	"Camellia (Remix)"	3:35
Total length:		37:23
