= Origin of Dazzle =

EP by Dazzle Vision
- Released: November 3, 2005
- Recorded: 2005
- Genre: alternative metal, post-hardcore
- Length: 35:30
- Label: Human Noise

Dazzle Vision chronology
Origin of Dazzle (2005)	Camellia Japonica (2007)

Origin of Dazzle is Dazzle Vision's debut EP. It was released on November 3, 2005 through Human Noise.

== Style ==
"Origin of Dazzle" is known to take influence from post-hardcore, Maiko's vocals in particular sounding reminiscent of much of those singers from the time. Maiko's overall view of the album was "I think that we wanted to make a strong impression on the music scene. We didn't want to sound like any other band out there, we shot for the stars." Leading to the band being dubbed screamo, J-pop, alternative metal, post-hardcore and forerunners of kawaii metal.

== Track listing ==
No.	Title	Writer(s)	{{{extra_column}}}	Length
1.	"the answer"	Maiko	Intro	1:42
2.	"懺悔 (Zange)"	Dazzle Vision		5:52
3.	"空迫 (Kuhaku)"	Maiko and Teru		3:36
4.	"三途 (Sanzu)"	Dazzle Vision		5:26
5.	"幻浄 (Genjou)"	Maiko		3:49
6.	"四季別 (Shiki betsu)"	Dazzle Vision		5:26
7.	"the answer you could have"	Maiko	Outro	9:22
Total length:				35:30
