= Kirari Yamaguchi =

Japanese shogi player

- Native name: 山口稀良莉
- Born: January 11, 2005 (age 21)
- Hometown: Gifu, Gifu Prefecture, Japan

Career
- Achieved professional status: December 1, 2020 (aged 15)
- Badge Number: W-72
- Rank: Women's 1-dan
- Teacher: Shōdo Nakada (7-dan)

Websites
- JSA profile page

Kirari Yamaguchi (山口 稀良莉, Yamaguchi Kirari; born January 11, 2005) is a Japanese women's professional shogi player ranked 1-dan.

== Women's shogi professional ==
=== Promotion history ===
Yamaguchi's promotion history is as follows:

- 2-kyū: December 1, 2020
- 1-kyū: September 22, 2021
- 1-dan: April 1, 2025

Note: All ranks are women's professional ranks.

== Personal life ==
Kirari's older sister Nikori is also a women's professional shogi player. The two are the fifth pair of sisters to become women's professionals.
