= Flyable Heart =

2009 video game

- Developer: UNiSONSHIFT: Blossom
- Publisher: UNiSONSHIFT
- Platform: Windows
- Release: JP: March 19, 2009
- Genres: Eroge, Visual novel
- Mode: Single-player

Flyable Heart (フライアブル ハート, Furaiaburu Hāto) is a Japanese visual novel developed by UNiSONSHIFT first released on March 19, 2009 for the PC as a limited edition DVD playable on personal computers, followed by a regular edition release on April 3, 2009. The game is described by the development team as a "being involved in two student council school love comedy adventure" (ダブル生徒会にまきこまれちゃう！学園ラブコメＡＤＶ, Daburu Seito-kai ni Makikomarechau! Gakuen Rabukome ADV), and bears the tagline "The future has already begun". The gameplay in Flyable Heart follows a linear plot line, which offers pre-determined scenarios and courses of interaction, and focuses on the appeal of the six female main characters. A fan disc to the game, called Flyable CandyHeart with the tagline "The future is always connected", was released on February 25, 2011.

== Gameplay ==
The gameplay in Flyable Heart requires little player interaction as much of the game's duration is spent reading the text that appears on the screen, which represents either dialogue between various characters or the inner thoughts of the protagonist. Every so often the player will come to a "decision point", where he or she is given the chance to choose from multiple options. The time between these points is variable and can occur anywhere from a minute to much longer. Gameplay pauses at these points, and depending on which choice the player makes, the plot will progress in a specific direction. There are six main plot lines that the player will have the chance to experience, one for each of the heroines. In order to view all five plot lines, the player will have to replay the game multiple times and make difference decisions to progress the plot in an alternate direction.

== Plot and characters ==
The story of Flyable Heart revolves around the protagonist Shou Katsuragi (葛木 晶, Katsuragi Shō), a high school student who has recently transferred into the Ōtoriryōran Academy (鳳繚蘭学園, Ōtoriryōran Gakuen), a notorious private high school known for its high academic standards. There are two associations representing the student body in the school, the Ryōran association (繚蘭会), and the student council. Members of the Ryōran association are appointed and manages the campus' operations, as opposed to the student council whose members are elected and manages affairs for the student body. Upon being enrolled into the school, Shou is welcomed by fellow students and is greeted by fireworks. He is then forced to reside in the all-girls Ryōran association dormitory as the male dormitory is completely occupied. He spends most of his time with members from the two student associations and other students. One of his fellow students is Yui Inaba (稲羽 結衣, Inaba Yui; Voiced by: Yui Ogura), the main heroine of Flyable Heart. Like Shou, Yui has recently transferred into the school, and is not yet familiar with the many unusual aspects of the school. She has a bright, but also timid personality, and has an affection towards doughnuts, claiming it is the only thing of a large size that can be eaten anywhere.

He later also meets Amane Sumeragi (皇 天音, Sumeragi Amane; Voiced by: Yuana Miyazawa). Amane is in the same class as Shou, and is the president of the Ryōran association. She has an aggressive personality and a strong sense of responsibility, in contrast to her carefree elder brother and student council president, Souryu Sumeragi (皇 奏龍, Sumeragi Sōryū; Voiced by: Uta Kijima). Syo also meets Sakurako Minase (水無瀬 桜子, Minase Sakurako; Voiced by: Soyogi Tōno), another Ryōran association member. Sakurako is soft-spoken and has a gentle personality, but is also a natural airhead. Mayuri Shirasagi (白鷺 茉百合, Shirasagi Mayuri; Voiced by: Chisato Suzumori) is the vice-president of the student council. She has a kind and elegant personality, and excels in academics and sports. Mayuri and Sakurako often spend time together as friends. The two also have a high reputation among students for their respective stature and personality. Suzuno Yukishiro (雪代 すずの, Yukishiro Suzuno; Voiced by: Yukina Fujimori) is a girl from Shou's class. Like Sakurako, she is soft-spoken and well-mannered. She has a weak body, and claims she is a spirit not visible to human eyes. The sixth and final heroine in Flyable Heart is Kururi Kujo (九条 くるり, Kujō Kururi; Voiced by: Yasura Chatani). Kururi is a first year student at Shou's school. She has a cold and quiet personality, and serves as the matron to the Ryōran association's dormitory. She is skilled at mechanics, and is the creator of Syo's robot roommate, Maxx (マックス, Makkusu; Voiced by: Momo Miki).

== Development ==
Flyable Heart is the twentieth project developed by the visual novel student UNiSONSHIFT, and the third under their Blossom subdivision. Character designs were provided by three people, all of whom also provided art direction. Noizi Ito provided designs for the male protagonist Shou and the entire female cast, with the exception of Kururi, whose designs were provided by Ayato Sasakura, and Megumi, whose designs were provided by Pero, who also provided designs for the supporting male cast except Kyōichirō, who was designed by Sasakura. The scenario in the game was provided by three people, Tamaki Ichikawa, Bonanza Kazama, and Baria Ago, based on the original story by the group @Piece, composed of Kichiemo, Ito, and Pero. Music in the game was composed solely by Ryō Mizutsuki. Most of the production team have worked on previous UNiSONSHIFT titles such as Nanatsuiro Drops, with the exception of Ago, who has previously worked for Navel, and Sasakura, known for her work on the Shakugan no Shana manga series, whose character designs were based on Ito's illustrations for the light novels.

== Related media ==
=== Manga ===
Before the game's release, a four-panel Internet manga illustrated by Pero, one of the art directors in the game, began to be serialized irregularly on the game's official website. The comic strips has also appeared in several bishōjo magazines, such as Dengeki Hime and Dengeki G's Magazine. A second manga adaptation illustrated by Shōko Iwami has also been announced to be serialized in ASCII Media Works' Dengeki G's Festival! Comic.
