= Dazzle Vision =

Japanese metal band

- Origin: Japan
- Genres: Alternative metal; post-hardcore; screamo; alternative rock
- Years active: 2003–2015
- Labels: Human Noise; Tower Records
- Members: Maiko (vocals; 2003–2015); Tony (guitar; 2014–2015); Takuro (bass; 2003–2015); Haru (drums; 2004–2015)
- Past members: Natu (drums; 2003–2004); Tan (guitar; 2003–2006); Ryu (guitar; 2006–2008); Yu (guitar; 2008–2010); John (guitar; 2010–2013)

Dazzle Vision was a Japanese rock band. They appeared at Sakura-Con in 2010. They were well known for their heavy rock sound and vocalist Maiko's dichotomy of melodic singing and death vocals. The band announced their disbandment in April 2015.

== History ==
Dazzle Vision formed in 2003. The two main founders of Dazzle Vision are brother and sister Maiko and Takuro.

In 2006, Dazzle Vision released their first album Origin of Dazzle. They performed concerts in Taiwan in 2006 and 2007.

On April 3, 2010, Dazzle Vision made their North American debut at Sakura-Con in Seattle, Washington, as the opening act for High and Mighty Color.

Dazzle Vision did not maintain a steady line-up, changing the drummer and several guitarists.

== Influences, concepts, and musical styles ==
Our concept is Children create the world. Adults, who are moving the world and society now, all started out as children. As we grow up, we tend to justify escaping or compromising by making excuses. In a pure way, we want to deliver the thoughts we had as children to create a wonderful world.

— Maiko about Dazzle Vision's concept, 2010

Siblings Maiko and Takuro began the band with the concept of "Children Create The World". Dazzle Vision developed its style with influences from Western culture such as Within Temptation, Black Sabbath, and Metallica. The band regularly incorporated English into their lyrics.

While the band self-described themselves as Screamo-Pop, they branched out into many different music genres such as alternative metal, hard rock, melodic death metal, progressive rock, glam metal, pop, post-hardcore, screamo and forerunners of kawaii metal. The band's albums each have a new distinct sound different from the last. Among the Japanese alternative scene, Dazzle Vision made an impact, mixing their strong vocals, dark riffs, and powerhouse screamo rants.

== Discography ==
=== Albums ===
Dazzle Vision produced five studio albums, an EP, and a greatest hits. Each album has a different sound from the last, with the most predominate sound being alternative metal.

- Camellia Japonica (April 23, 2007)
- Crystal Children (November 21, 2008)
- To the Next (May 12, 2010) (US debut)
- Kirari (June 3, 2011)
- Final Attack (March 7, 2014)

=== EPs ===
- Origin of Dazzle (November 3, 2005)

=== Compilations ===
- Shocking Loud Voice (May 4, 2012)

=== Singles ===
- Metsu / All refused (November 21, 2008)
- Evolution (November 9, 2012)
