= Kirari (album) =

Studio album by Dazzle Vision
- Released: June 3, 2011
- Recorded: 2011
- Genres: Alternative metal, post-hardcore, alternative rock
- Length: 41:50
- Label: Human Noise

Singles from Kirari
- 1. "Kirari" Released: April 14, 2011; 2. "Continue" Released: May 5, 2011; 3. "Like I'm Not Real" Released: June 2, 2011; 4. "Reason" Released: June 2, 2011

Kirari (Sparkling in English) is Dazzle Vision's fifth overall release, containing 12 songs. Kirari dropped on June 3, 2011, by Human Noise records. To date, Kirari is Dazzle Vision's most successful album, topping HMV's charts.

== Style ==
While Dazzle Vision is well known for creating a new mood and style for each album, Kirari is said to be all these influences put into a blender. The album opens up with a gut-wrenching power ballad with screamo undertones and heavy riffs not typical of the usual power ballad. From there this record bounces between alternative metal, rock, and post-hardcore vibes. The LP also showcases the softer side of Dazzle Vision much like their previous album Crystal Children, clashing pop and rock into tunes such as "Continue" and "Divided".

== Music videos ==
Dazzle Vision made two music videos for this album. The two songs were "Like I'm Not Real" and "Kirari", both different in setup and style. The music videos were produced by Human Noise Records. "Kirari" was released on April 14, 2011, the same day that the single was released on iTunes Japan. "Like I'm Not Real" was released on June 3, 2011, as promotion for the album itself. The other two singles, "Continue" and "Reason", were not made into music videos because of the band's tour with Evanescence during their Japan Tour in 2012.

== Track listing ==
No.	Title	Writer(s)	Length
1.	"Kirari"	Maiko	5:07
2.	"Reason"	Dazzle Vision	3:03
3.	"Like I'm Not Real"	Maiko and Haru	3:07
4.	"Barabara-u"	Dazzle Vision	3:23
5.	"Infinite (∞)"	Maiko	1:42
6.	"Miss Cinderella 2"	Dazzle Vision	3:37
7.	"One for All, All for One"	Takuro	4:18
8.	"12 Tsuki"	Dazzle Vision	3:54
9.	"Zero"	Maiko, John, Takuro	3:38
10.	"Continue"	Maiko	1:29
11.	"Tsuki to taiyō"	John and Maiko	3:58
12.	"Sakura (Divided)"	Maiko	4:43
Total length:			41:50
