= Noizi Ito =

Japanese manga and game artist

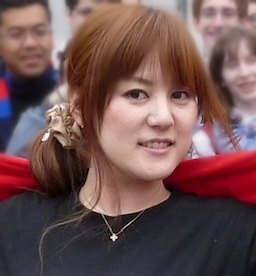
- Noizi Ito at Epitanime 2010
- Born: August 9, 1977 (age 48); Kakogawa, Hyōgo, Japan
- Notable work: Shakugan no Shana; Haruhi Suzumiya

Noizi Ito (いとうのいぢ, Itō Noiji; born August 9, 1977) is a Japanese light novel and video game artist. She is employed by the H-game maker UNiSONSHIFT and is a part of the circle Fujitsubo-Machine. Unlike most romanized Japanese words and names, Noizi Ito's name uses the Kunrei-shiki romanization form.

Ito is well known for her work as the character designer and artist for the Shakugan no Shana novel series which spawned a manga and anime series. She has also worked on the Haruhi Suzumiya novel series along with its author Nagaru Tanigawa. Their work has also led to an anime television series titled after the first book in the series, The Melancholy of Haruhi Suzumiya. She is also the character designer for the 2012 anime series Another and for the Virtual YouTuber Tenjin Kotone.

== Career ==
Ito first began creating characters around the time she graduated from middle school. She grew up at a time when fighting games were popular with her and her classmates and developed an interest, beyond just controlling the characters, in the aesthetics and design of characters. After purchasing a book on breaking into the industry, Ito began going for job interviews at Osaka-based companies near to home, such as Capcom. While she made it past the initial round, she did not, however, get the job and in the end found a job working for Softpal on visual novels.

She had started a manga series called Bee-be-beat it! which was introduced in volume 1 of the Dragon Age Pure magazine. Furthermore, she has worked on three adult game projects for UNiSONSHIFT Blossom. The first was Nanatsuiro Drops, released in 2006, followed by the Alice in Wonderland themed Alice Parade, released in 2007, and Flyable Heart, released in 2009. She was also the artist in the adult games Peace@Pieces, Forget Me Not, and also Komorebi ni Yureru Tamashii no Koe, all under the UNiSONSHIFT label. Outside UNiSONSHIFT, she has recently worked as one of the illustrators for Sega and Flight-Plan's DS game Shining Force Feather.

== Games ==
UNISONSHiFT

- Be-reave (1999)
- Wasurenagusa Forget-Me-Not (2002)
- Komorebi ni Yureru Tamashii no Koe (2003)
- Peace@Pieces (2004)

UNISONSHiFT Blossom

- Nanatsuiro Drops (2006)
- Alice Parade (2007)
- Flyable Heart (2009)
- Kimi no Nagori wa Shizuka ni Yurete (2010)
- FlyableCandy Heart (2011)

Nippon Ichi Software

- The Guided Fate Paradox (2013)
- The Guided Fate Cross Thesis (2014)

Sega

- Sakura Wars (2019)

Flight-Plan

- Shining Force Feather (2009)

Other

- Fire Emblem Heroes (2017)

== Art books ==
Over the years, Fujitsubo-Machine has produced several art books featuring art by Noizi Ito. The publishing company MediaWorks published Guren: Ito Noizi Art Collection (いとうのいぢ画集「紅蓮」) on January 27, 2005. Kaen: Ito Noizi Art Collection II (いとうのいぢ画集 II「華焔」) was released on August 7, 2007. Sōen: Ito Noizi Art Collection III (いとうのいぢ画集 III「蒼炎」) was released on August 10, 2009. Haruhi-ism Ito Noizi Illustration (いとうのいぢ画集 ハルヒ主義) was released on April 30, 2009. The Ito Noizi Art Collection Haruhi Hyakka (いとうのいぢ画集 ハルヒ百花) was released on May 1, 2013.

== Art style ==
Ito stated that she enjoys drawing because "the first thing players are attracted to is the game's art". Many of these games take place in the emotionally charged world of high school and Ito draws from her own experiences. Although she has designed several very successful characters, Ito stated that she draws her inspiration from anything she comes across. She described the midpoint between a young female and adult body where it resembles their male counterparts and simultaneously are on the cusp of becoming a full-fledged woman as being the form she likes the best and enjoys drawing the most. Ito stated that since all women have been high school girls at one point and enjoy reminiscing about those times, noting that "being a high school girl is probably the best time in a girl's life."
