= Æon Flux (disambiguation) =

Æon Flux is an adult animated series.

Æon Flux may also refer to:

- Æon Flux (film), the live action film adaptation of the animated series
- Æon Flux (video game), the video game adaptation of the live action film
