= Trevor Goodchild =

Fictional character appearing in the Æon Flux franchise

- Æon Flux character
- First appearance: Liquid Television (1991)
- Last appearance: Æon Flux (film) (2005)
- Created by: Peter Chung
- Portrayed by: Marton Csokas (film)
- Voiced by: John Rafter Lee (animated series); Troy Baker (video game)

In-universe information
- Gender: Male
- Family: Oren (brother, in film)
- Nationality: Breen

Chairman of Bregna
- Preceded by: Clavius (Note: as President of Bregna)
- Succeeded by: Office abolished

Trevor Goodchild is a fictional character featured in the 1990s animated television series, Æon Flux, the 2005 Æon Flux live-action film, and the 2005 Æon Flux video game.

== Character overview ==
Chairman Trevor Goodchild is usually seen as the villain of the series, although creator Peter Chung has occasionally said in interviews that the character is meant to be morally ambiguous.

He is the self-appointed leader of the nation of Bregna; it is suggested he rose to power in a coup over his insane predecessor. Though his title is Chairman, it is not clear what exactly this means. His predecessor was referred to as the President, and in one episode an upper house of parliament is mentioned. In another episode, he refers to the government as a republic.

He is usually depicted as a charismatic, narcissistic, perverted, cold hearted demagogue politician, sometime he's a hypocritical philosophical ruler or a calculating mad scientist of the technocratic authoritarian Bregna and as an opposite to the amoral "terrorist" anarchist Æon Flux of the free-spirited Monican people. Goodchild's motives are left ambiguous; on many occasions he seems genuinely interested in improving the human condition, but at others he is only concerned with retaining or increasing his power.

His own people seem to have dramatically changing opinions of him. In the first episode, he is referred to as "Our most beloved public official," and the people cheer at seeing him defeat an assassin. Others, however, seem completely disgusted by him and attempt to kill him or escape from his control. In general, the Breen soldiers he commands seem loyal, if often very confused by him.

As is typical of the Æon Flux series' style of storytelling, there is much ambiguity and inconsistency as to the nature of his position. While he is usually depicted as a complete autocrat, the episode "Thanatophobia" suggests that there are other individuals in the Breen government that Trevor must answer to, or at least give the impression of being accountable to. Though his official title seems to be Chairman, Goodchild often takes a much more hands-on approach to his work than a typical administrator. He is shown at the forefront of armed operations on at least two occasions, as well as conducting other tasks such as performing medical checkups on patients wounded by his own fiendish security systems (a house call, no less). However, he is far from brave, as he has an array of escape devices to get him out of danger. The most likely explanation for his curious penchant for field work is his desire to get close to Æon Flux.

Trevor also has a tendency to delve into deep, Orwellian rants, which often serve as narration for the episodes. These musings appear to be in the form of soliloquies, but in the episode "The Purge," they are shown to be out loud. In an early draft of "The Demiurge" and in the end of the episode "Reraizure" these comments are implied to be recordings into his neck microphone. His musings tend to be confusing, often running the full length without actually saying anything, and lend to the series' own ambiguous nature.

== Relationship with Æon Flux ==
Æon and Trevor have a love–hate relationship, in which he consistently tries to protect her despite violently thwarting most of her operations. This relationship is less developed in the original Liquid Television shorts, in which he occasionally attempts to kill her. Trevor is often frustrated by Æon's apparent lack of understanding of his own occasionally nebulous motives; he will be invariably heard to say "You just don't get it, do you?" Æon is generally not impressed with his grand plans, going so far as to call him a deranged individual in one episode.

In one of the Liquid Television shorts, Æon actually appears to be working for or with Trevor. In the episode "Thanatophobia," Trevor mentions that he lets Æon sneak across the border and bomb a factory, thus allowing him to implant ever stricter security measures. This implies that, though Æon may not work directly for him, it seems as though he uses her actions to his advantage. The pair's relationship reaches its apex in the series finale, "End Sinister", in which Æon pursues Trevor on a one-way trip 1,000 years into the future. It could be said that Trevor and Æon are attracted to each other but are separated by their goals, as evidenced in "The Demiurge", where they fight over the Demiurge's fate but have a brief but intimate encounter in the midst of a conflict.

== Episode appearances ==
The episodes "Pilot" through "War" are standalone episodes broadcast as short films on the series Liquid Television. There is intentionally no continuity between the episodes (which all include the death of the Æon Flux character). Beginning with "Utopia or Deutoronopia" episodes are a half-hour in length and maintain a loose continuity.

=== Pilot ===
An insect is spreading a fatal disease. After Æon fails to stop him, Trevor cures the disease. Thereafter, Trevor's visage appears on the country's currency (which is when his name is revealed for the first time).

=== Gravity ===
While French kissing Æon, Trevor uses his tongue in order to insert a tiny picture into a hidden compartment in one of Æon's teeth. The picture, of a man and a briefcase, is apparently Æon's 'target.'

=== Night / Mirror ===
Trevor enters an assassination target's mansion one minute before Æon does. Trevor completes the assassination, and then shoots Æon in the neck. Before she dies, Æon sees on the security camera that it was Trevor. This is the only time Trevor himself intentionally kills Æon (this would not happen in the half-hour series given their relationship's development).

=== Leisure ===
What appears to be Trevor is seen chained in Æon's cupboard ravenously eating the eggs of an alien creature.

=== Tide ===
From an elevator that is on the 7th floor, Trevor presses buttons 1–6. He also throws a key for a door that is on level 2 behind some pipes. Æon handcuffs him in the elevator while she attempts to find the door. (She checks on every floor.) On the 2nd floor, after another woman has killed Æon, a guard enters and shoots Trevor. Only the guard escapes as the facility sinks. While it is common for Æon to be killed in each installment of these early episodes, this is the only time Trevor himself is killed in the shorts.

=== War ===
Trevor is not seen in this episode, though a Breen soldier who removes his helmet resembles him, albeit with a different hair style.

=== Utopia or Deuteranopia ===
Trevor rises to power by kidnapping Clavius, the elected president of Bregna. Trevor also constructs an extradimensional space inside Clavius's body for himself and Æon, introducing his obsession with her. He institutes a panopticon of citizen surveillance claiming that "only an open society can be a just society." Gildemere, a Breen soldier, tries to expose Trevor's treasonous acts but ends up murdering Clavius in the process, easing Trevor's ascent to autocracy.

=== Isthmus Crypticus ===
Trevor captures a pair of seraf-trevs—beautiful, winged creatures whose ability to give humans sexual ecstasy is legendary. His love affair with the female seraf-trev is cut short when Ilbren, a jealous Breen, tries to liberate her and kills her in the process.

=== Thanatophobia ===
In this episode, Trevor appears repeatedly to treat the spinal injuries of Sybil, who was shot during an attempted border crossing. (Her lover, Onan, succeeded.) Trevor provides Sybil with a box of ampoules (which are inserted into the gap in her spine, allowing her to function normally). Trevor also repeatedly sexually stimulates Sybil by manipulating the nerves in her spinal column at the location of the aforementioned gap. At one point, Trevor mentions that he lets Æon bomb a factory, implying that he uses her terrorist actions as justification for cracking down even harder on the populace.

=== A Last Time For Everything ===
Trevor has developed a method for creating exact human duplicates. Æon tricks him into making a copy of her in a plan to manipulate his emotions towards her. In the end Æon decides (with difficulty) to remain loyal to herself (i.e., her copy) and not Trevor, allowing herself to be killed by the gun turrets of the Breen border containment system. While this episode is mainly focused on Æon's personality, it also gives some great insights into Trevor's character. For instance, we see that his obsession with Æon is such that he keeps an entire harem of girls done up to look like her in his home. Following Æon's death, Trevor is seen to fall to his knees with tears streaming down his face, implying that there is more to him than the cold-hearted, calculating mad scientist.

=== The Demiurge ===
Trevor tries to prevent the Monicans from launching a god-like being known as the Demiurge from the planet, ridding Earth of its influence. He fails, but the Demiurge impregnates a Monican male with its child. Trevor captures the Monican and takes him to his Tower, where he gives birth to a being similar (if not identical) to the original Demiurge, re-introducing the Demiurge's influence on humanity. This being later saves the Monican's lover from certain death, although it is unclear whether or not the Demiurge survives. Perception was a major theme of this episode. At the beginning of the episode, Trevor is heard speaking of perception and significance, and when the lover of the Monican implanted with the Demiurge's offspring tries to crush a box with a glowing, three-eyed cat inside fails to do so and walks away from it, it is shown to the audience that it stopped glowing when no one was looking at it. The Demiurge's true power may only be the ability to alter perception and emotion.

=== Reraizure ===
Trevor is attempting to collect the entire world's population of the cannibalistic, immortal frog-like creatures known as Nargyles for his experiments. He enlists the help of a woman whose lover, Rordy, is collecting the Nargyles in a plot to exterminate them by shooting them into the sun in revenge for losing his memories as a side-effect of Bliss, the potent narcotic the Nargyles produce. Things get complicated, however, when Æon Flux inadvertently kills Rordy's lover and takes her place, unaware of her involvement in Trevor's scheme.

=== Chronophasia ===
Trevor and his cohorts explore the jungle in search of an underground laboratory complex that Æon comes across, attempting to uncover experimentation involving a virus that causes human madness. Trevor attempts to capture the exposed subjects such as Æon, a boy, and a baby that has grown into some sort of crawling beast that erases memories and induces sleep. The episode seems to repeat events as if the characters were returning to an earlier time in the episode. In one iteration, Trevor appears to die, only to be alive in a later part of the episode. Æon undergoes continuously bizarre experiences/visions that involve a recurrent dream of a maze and the photograph of the baby girl she carries from the beginning of the episode. The ending vision (or is it reality?) is of Æon as a suburban mom taking her son (the boy) to a little-league baseball game.

=== Ether Drift Theory ===
Trevor Goodchild creates an isolated ecosystem in the shape of a giant cube suspended in a sea of paralytic fluid. The city is populated by various engineered creatures, many of which resemble humans. Æon enters the cube with the girlfriend of the chief scientist working under Goodchild only to accidentally start a chain chemical reaction that eventually destroys the entire complex. At first, Trevor is fully dedicated to protecting the project and what it represents at all costs. However, he quickly seems to become bored with it and gives up on the project entirely.

=== The Purge ===
Trevor is implementing a system of "artificial conscience" for citizens of Bregna who appear to lack one of their own, by implanting a robotic entity called a "Custodian". Æon joins a secretive group which opposes this, and eventually confronts Trevor. The effectiveness of Trevor's intelligence network is displayed, as he seems to know everything about the secret group, and ambushes and captures each of its members, including Æon. Whether or not Æon is herself implanted with a Custodian in the interim is left somewhat ambiguous.

=== End Sinister ===
Trevor, in this episode, has in his possession a device which would fire a ray at the Earth, killing much of humanity but furthering the progress of evolution. Before he can accomplish this, an alien-like being is found near Trevor's compound, which he becomes obsessed with, and which agrees to take Trevor to their homeworld. Æon, after sealing herself away for centuries in suspended animation, finds that Bregna is now populated by these beings and that Trevor is still alive, attempting (in a rather ascetic manner) to emulate them. Æon, not realizing that the creatures were actually humanity's further-evolved state, uses the aforementioned ray to destroy them, leaving only herself, Trevor, and a very few "alien" survivors. The episode (and series) ends with the both of them in the same suspended-animation chamber Æon used.

== Film appearance ==
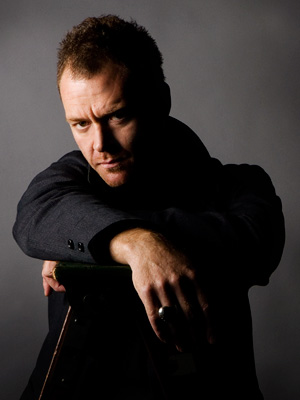
Marton Csokas portrays Trevor in the 2005 film.

Trevor is portrayed by Marton Csokas in the 2005 film Æon Flux.

The film adaptation adds Oren (Jonny Lee Miller), Trevor's brother and nemesis, as well as storyline in which Trevor, Æon Flux (Charlize Theron) and everyone in Bregna are clones of early 21st century originals.
