= John Rafter Lee =

English actor, narrator, playwright and producer

- Born: England
- Occupations: Actor; narrator; playwright; producer
- Years active: 1992–present

John Rafter Lee is an English actor, narrator, playwright and producer.

== Biography ==
Lee was born in England with Irish ancestry. His father worked as a carpenter and other men in his family were blacksmiths, brick layers and plumbers. Lee himself has worked in agriculture, picking fruit, which he considers much more difficult than voice acting.

== Career ==
Lee has narrated hundreds of audiobooks. "His trademark rich, smooth voice with its hint of a growl turns the word into a seduction", according to AudioFile. He has won numerous Audie Awards and AudioFile Earphones Awards, and he was named a Golden Voice by AudioFile in 2009.

In film, he portrayed the mysterious Trevor Goodchild in Peter Chung's Æon Flux. Other voice credits include Meier Link in both Vampire Hunter D: Bloodlust and Vampire Hunter D, Pavlo Zaitsev in episode 16 of Ghost in the Shell: Stand Alone Complex, Jason Wynn in HBO's Spawn animated series, and Aristotle in Reign: The Conqueror. John also had a role as a voice actor playing Cid Bunansa in the video game Final Fantasy XII.

Lee was also the producer and screenwriter for the 2001 film Breathing Hard, in which he played the character John Duggan. His Æon Flux co-star Denise Poirier plays his wife Carol.

He has written the plays Blood and Milk, Hitler's Head, Passchendaele, Clean Souls and Frankincense. He has adapted into English Schiller's Don Carlos, Racine's Britannicus and Grabbe's Jest, Satire, Irony and Deeper Significance. Passchendaele received its first production at the New York Fringe Festival in August 2010.

His latest film, which he wrote and co-produced, is Forfeit, which received its premiere at the 2007 South by Southwest Film Festival in Austin, Texas. He is currently writing a film to be shot in his hometown, Birmingham, England.

== Awards and honors ==
AudioFile named Lee a Golden Voice narrator.

=== Awards ===
Year	Title	Award	Result	Ref.
2003	The Fifth Sorceress (2002) by Robert Newcomb	Audie Award for Science Fiction	Finalist	
2004	A Death in Vienna (2004) by Daniel Silva	Earphone Award	Winner	
2006	The Black Tattoo by Sam Enthoven	Listen Up Award for Teens	Winner	
2006	Cloud Atlas (2004) by David Mitchell	Audie Award for Literary Fiction or Classics	Finalist	
2006	The Sea by John Banville	Listen Up Award for Fiction	Winner	
2008	Dreaming Void by Peter Hamilton	Listen Up Award for Science Fiction/Fantasy	Finalist	
2008	The Long Walk by Sławomir Rawicz	Audie Award for Solo Narration - Male	Finalist	
2008	Poe's Children: The New Horror, edited by Peter Straus	Listen Up Award for Full Cast/Multiple Voices	Finalist	
2008	The Solitude of Thomas Cave (2007) by Georgina Harding	Earphone Award	Winner	
2008	White Fang / Call of the Wild (1906) by Jack London	Audie Award for Classics	Finalist	
2008	The White Tiger (2008) by Aravind Adiga	Earphone Award	Winner	
2008	The White Tiger (2008) by Aravind Adiga	Listen Up Award for Fiction	Finalist	
2009	The Count of Monte Cristo(1846) by Alexandre Dumas	Earphone Award	Winner	
2009	The Count of Monte Cristo(1846) by Alexandre Dumas	Audie Award for Classic	Finalist	
2009	The Count of Monte Cristo(1846) by Alexandre Dumas	Audie Award for Solo Narration - Male	Winner	
2009	The White Tiger (2008) by Aravind Adiga	Audie Award for Literary Fiction	Finalist	
2009	The White Tiger (2008) by Aravind Adiga	Audie Award for Solo Narration - Male	Finalist	
2010	Operation Mincemeat by Ben Macintyre	Listen Up Award for Nonfiction	Winner	
2010	The Price of Love and Other Stories (1999) by Anne Baker	Audie Award for Thriller or Suspense	Finalist	
2011	Fall of Giants (2010) by Ken Follett	Audie Award for Fiction	Finalist	
2011	This Body of Death by Elizabeth George	Audie Award for Mystery	Finalist	
2011	The Woman in White (1859) by Wilkie Collins	Audie Award for Classic	Winner	
2012	Double Cross by Ben Macintyre	Listen Up Award for Nonfiction	Finalist	
2013	Dracula (1897) by Bram Stoker	Audie Award for Classic	Finalist	
2013	Dracula (1897) by Bram Stoker	Audie Award for Distinguished Achievement in Production	Winner	
2013	Dracula (1897) by Bram Stoker	Audie Award for Multi-Voiced Performance	Winner	
2013	The Miracle of Mindfulness by Thich Nhat Hanh	Listen Up Award for Nonfiction	Finalist	
2014	A Spy Among Friends by Ben Macintyre	Listen Up Award for Nonfiction	Winner	
2015	A Spy Among Friends by Ben Macintyre	Audie Award for History or Biography	Finalist	
2016	Sweetland (2015) by Michael Crummey	Audie Award for Literary Fiction or Classics	Finalist	
2018	Darkest Hour (2017) by Anthony McCarten	Earphone Award	Winner	
2018	Spellmonger, Book 1 by Terry Mancour	Audie Award for Fantasy	Finalist	
2019	Darkest Hour (2017) by Anthony McCarten	Audie Award for History or Biography	Winner	
2020	Lovely War (2019) by Julie Berry	Audie Award for Young Adult Title	Finalist	
2020	The Splendid and the Vile (2020) by Erik Larson	Earphone Award	Winner	
2022	The Man in the Brown Suit (1924) by Agatha Christie	Audie Award for Mystery	Finalist	

=== "Best of" lists ===
Year	Title	List	Ref.
2004	A Death in Vienna by Daniel Silva	AudioFile Best of Mystery & Suspense	
2004	White Fang / Call of the Wild (1906) by Jack London	AudioFile Best of Classics	
2007	Midnight over Sanctaphrax by Paul Stewart and Chris Riddell	ALSC Notable Children's Recordings	
2008	The Black Tattoo by Sam Enthoven	Selected Audiobooks for Young Adults	
2008	The Solitude of Thomas Cave (2007) by Georgina Harding	AudioFile Best of Fiction	
2008	The White Tiger (2008) by Aravind Adiga	AudioFile Best of Fiction	
2009	The Count of Monte Cristo(1846) by Alexandre Dumas	AudioFile Best of Classics	
2010	The Bell Ringers (2010) by Henry Porter	AudioFile Best of Mystery & Suspense	
2010	The History of the Medieval World(2010) by Susan Wise Bauer	AudioFile Best of History & Historical Fiction	
2010	The Price of Love and Other Stories (1999) by Anne Baker	AudioFile Best of Mystery & Suspense	
2010	The Swan Thieves (2010) by Elizabeth Kostova	AudioFile Best of Fiction	
2013	The Redeemer (2013) by Jo Nesbø	AudioFile Best of Mystery & Suspense	
2015	The Abyss Beyond Dreams (2014) by Peter F. Hamilton	Booklist Editors' Choice: Audio for Adults	
2015	The Abyss Beyond Dreams (2014) by Peter F. Hamilton	Booklist's Top 10 Adult SF/Fantasy/Horror on Audio	
2015	Sweetland (2015) by Michael Crummey	AudioFile Best of Fiction	
2016	The Hero With A Thousand Faces (1949) by Joseph Campbell	AudioFile Best of Nonfiction & Culture	
2017	Prussian Blue (2017) by Philip Kerr	Booklist's Audio Stars for Adults	
2017	Prussian Blue (2017) by Philip Kerr	Booklist Editors' Choice: Audio for Adults	
2017	Prussian Blue (2017) by Philip Kerr	Booklist's Top 10 Crime Fiction Audiobooks	
2017	The Thirst (2017) by Jo Nesbø with Neil Smith (trans.)	AudioFile Best of Mystery & Suspense	
2020	Lovely War (2019) by Julie Berry	Amazing Audiobooks for Young Adults	
2020	The Splendid and the Vile (2020) by Erik Larson	AudioFile Best of History & Biography	

== Filmography ==
=== Film ===
Year	Title	Role	Notes
1992	Small Kill	Hit Man	
1998	Todd McFarlane's Spawn 2	Jason Wynn	Voice
1999	Todd McFarlane's Spawn 3: The Ultimate Battle	Jason Wynn	
1999	George Lucas in Love	Ranter	Short
1999	Princess Mononoke		Voice
2000	Vampire Hunter D: Bloodlust	Meier Link	Voice
2001	Breathing Hard	John Duggan	Also writer and producer
2003	Jules Verne & Walt Disney: Explorers of Imagination	Narrator	Documentary
2007	Forfeit	—N/a	Writer and producer

=== Television ===
Year	Title	Role	Notes
1995	Æon Flux	Trevor Goodchild	Voice, 10 episodes
1997–1999	Todd McFarlane's Spawn	Jason Wynn	Voice, 17 episodes
2000	Tenchi Muyo! Ryo-Ohki	Azusa Jurai	Voice, Episode: "Here Comes Jurai"
2003	Reign: The Conqueror	Aristotle	Voice, 4 episodes
2003	Ninja Scroll: The Series	Renya Yagyu	Voice
2003–2004	Ghost in the Shell: Stand Alone Complex	Kusunoki, Zaitsef, Security Guard, Yaku Humimari (voices)	Voice, 4 episodes

=== Video games ===
Year	Title	Role	Notes
2000	Vampire Hunter D	Meier Link	
2000	Vampire: The Masquerade – Redemption		
2006	Final Fantasy XII	Cid Bunansa	
