= List of Aaahh!!! Real Monsters episodes =

Aaahh!!! Real Monsters is an American animated television series created by Gábor Csupó and Peter Gaffney, and produced by Klasky Csupo in the United States. The show focuses on three young monsters: Ickis, Oblina, and Krumm, who attend an institute for monsters under a city dump to learn how to frighten humans. It premiered on Nickelodeon on October 29, 1994, and ended on November 16, 1997, with a total of 52 episodes over the course of four seasons.

== Series overview ==
Season	Segments	Episodes	Originally released	
Season	Segments	Episodes	First released	Last released
Pilot			Unaired	
1	24	13	October 29, 1994	February 26, 1995
2	26	13	October 28, 1995	March 10, 1996
3	26	13	September 15, 1996	December 8, 1996
4	26	13	August 24, 1997	November 16, 1997

== Episodes ==
=== Pilot (1993) ===
Title	Directed by	Written by	Original release date
"Pilot"	Igor Kovalyov	Peter Gaffney, Steve Granat, & Cydne Clark	Unaired
Ickis accidentally leaves behind his Monster Manual during a failed attempt at a scare and must get it back or face The Womble's wrath. Note: The episode "Monsters, Get Real!" is a remake of this pilot, with added footage and better animation.

=== Season 1 (1994–95) ===
No. overall	No. in season	Title	Directed by	Written by	Original release date	Prod. code
1	1	"The Switching Hour"	Jim Duffy	Marcy Gray Rubin & David Adam Silverman	October 29, 1994	001
On Halloween, Ickis, Oblina, and Krumm go out after the Gromble told them not to. Little do they know, Nicky, the human that Ickis scared the night before, dressed up as Ickis for Halloween, resulting in Oblina and Krumm thinking that Nicky is the real Ickis.
2a	2a	"Monsters, Get Real!"	Igor Kovalyov	Peter Gaffney, Steve Granat, Cydne Clark & Lawrence H. Levy	October 30, 1994	002A
Ickis, Oblina and Krumm pull off a good scare in Bradley's room, only to discover that Ickis has left his all-important monster manual on the surface. Note: This episode is a remake of the series' pilot with added footage and better animation.
2b	2b	"Snorched if You Do, Snorched if You Don't"	Jim Duffy	Lawrence H. Levy	October 30, 1994	002B
In a continuation of "Monsters, Get Real", Oblina and Krumm attempt to retrieve Ickis' monster manual before he is sent to the Snorch.
3a	3a	"Curse of the Krumm"	Andrei Svislotski	Bruce Kalish	November 6, 1994	003A
Odoriferous Krumm, who put the stink in distinct, loses his stench and fears his monstering days are numbered.
3b	3b	"Krumm Goes Hollywood"	Jim Duffy	David Litt	November 6, 1994	003B
A famous Hollywood director accidentally mistakes Krumm for his extra on his movie set and turns him into a huge star.
4a	4a	"Monstrous Makeover"	Igor Kovalyov	David Litt	November 13, 1994	004A
Due to having issues at school, Ickis leaves and talks to a guy at the Klasky Medical Center to perform makeovers on people (giving a girl 3 nostrils). Oblina and Krumm try to get him back.
4b	4b	"A Wing and a Scare"	Jim Duffy	Peter Gaffney	November 13, 1994	004B
Willing to scare a little girl, Ickis, Krumm, and Oblina get folded and spindled when they get themselves trapped in a suitcase and are loaded onto a plane bound for Wisconsin.
5a	5a	"Krumm's Pimple"	Andrei Svislotski	Michael Price, Cydne Clark & Steve Granat	December 4, 1994	005A
Krumm sprouts a gigantic pimple. The pimple has its own personality, and is a hit with the other monsters, putting the squeeze on Krumm's popularity.
5b	5b	"Monster Hunter"	Jim Duffy	Susan Meyers	December 4, 1994	005B
Simon says there are real monsters in the world, But no one believes him. Simon says he'll prove it to the world.
6a	6a	"Monsters Don't Dance"	Igor Kovalyov	Eric Mintz	December 11, 1994	006A
Thinking Murray the Monster is betraying the idea of being a monster by putting on a charade to sell merchandise, Oblina, Krumm, and Ickis try to teach him to actually be scary. However, Oblina, Krumm, and Ickis are shocked when they realize that Murray is just wearing a costume and is actually a merchandise salesman pretending to be a monster for financial gain.
6b	6b	"Gone Shopp'n"	Jim Duffy	David Litt	December 11, 1994	006B
'Tis the season to be scary, and Oblina, Ickis, and Krumm are happy to oblige. They terrorize shoppers in a mall celebrating Christmas in July, but the tables are turned when the trio find themselves locked inside when they had discovered an object that seemed really special: a lava lamp.
7a	7a	"Old Monster"	Andrei Svislotski	Marcy Gray Rubin & David Adam Silverman	December 18, 1994	007A
Ickis, Oblina, and Krumm are bored when Shroink, the Gromble's old teacher, lectures at the academy. But when they escort him back to the dump, they learn that old monsters are the best monsters.
7b	7b	"Mother, May I"	Jim Duffy	Michael Price	December 18, 1994	007B
Every boy and monster's worst fear is realized for the Gromble -- his mom shows up at the academy unannounced. The Gromble leaves her in the care of Ickis, Oblina, and Krumm for the afternoon with alarming results.
8a	8a	"Don't Just Do It"	Jim Duffy	David Litt	January 8, 1995	008A
Ickis gets a bad case of hero-worship when he is befriended by an impulsive monster drop-out Puhg, who takes Ickis to the surface without adequate preparations.
8b	8b	"Joined at the Hip"	Igor Kovalyov	Michael Karnow & Lance Khazei	January 8, 1995	008B
When the Gromble gets fed up with Ickis and Krumm, he merges them into one and nicknames them "Krickis".
9a	9a	"Smile and Say Oblina"	Andrei Svislotski	Gary Clasberg	January 22, 1995	009A
Even monsters get the blues, and Oblina proves it when she develops her first crush, on a monster named Gruge who starts noticing her after she got braces.
9b	9b	"The Great Wave"	Jim Duffy	Scott Kregor & David Pavoni	January 22, 1995	009B
Life is no "day at the beach" for Ickis as his self-esteem hits a tide when he is chosen to be a contestant in the Annual Riding of the Great Wave Competition.
10a	10a	"Cold Hard Toenails"	Jim Duffy	Peter Gaffney	February 5, 1995	010A
Ickis finds hundreds and hundreds of toenails (the most precious thing known to monsters) while trying to scare a human, and is now rich. But when he dumps his friends for toenails, brags about his wealth, and becomes a rude snob, he wants his old life back!
10b	10b	"Attack of the Blobs"	Igor Kovalyov	Lawrence H. Levy	February 5, 1995	010B
Oblina has never blobsat before, but that was no problem, unless, of course, the little blob hatches into a bon-sty and tries to eat everything in sight, including the blobsitter.
11a	11a	"Chip Off the Old Beast"	Andrei Svislotski	Richard Marcus	February 12, 1995	011A
Ickis fears nobody will ever say, "like father, like son," when Slickis, his famous father, who is the best student ever graduated from The Academy, visits Ickis and dazzles the monster multitudes.
11b	11b	"The War is Over"	Jim Duffy	William Schifrin	February 12, 1995	011B
The Gromble sends his three monster students on a routine scare of an old house. But it appears the house is haunted. And they're not sure if ghosts can scare a monster. But monsters don't believe in ghosts...or do they?
12	12	"Where Have All the Monsters Gone?"	Igor Kovalyov	David Litt, Marcy Gray Rubin & David Adam Silverman	February 19, 1995	012
The Gromble's students think he's all wet when he tells them about their legacy--the Pool of Elders. But they realize it's descending when they stop being scary, and the monsters start disappearing.
13a	13a	"Simon Strikes Back"	Jim Duffy	Susan Myers	February 26, 1995	013A
The host of a talk show offers Bradley, Murray, and Simon (all previous scare victims) a brand new car and 1 million dollars if they bring a monster at the talk show within 1 week. This gets Ickis captured, and he has to help the first person he scared.
13b	13b	"The Ickis Box"	Andrei Svislotski	Peter Gaffney	February 26, 1995	013B
Ickis wants to prove the Gromble wrong and show other monsters that TV isn't all that bad for young monsters by making his own television set out of junk.

=== Season 2 (1995–96) ===
No. overall	No. in season	Title	Directed by	Written by	Original release date	Prod. code	U.S. households (millions)
14a	1a	"Spontaneously Combustible"	Igor Kovalyov	Mark Steen & Mark Palmer	October 28, 1995	014A	N/A
Ickis is diagnosed as spontaneously combustible, a condition that gives him explosive belching, and rumors of him literally exploding spread throughout the academy.
14b	1b	"Curse of Katana"	Jim Duffy	Mark Palmer	October 28, 1995	014B	N/A
At a museum for a routine scare, Ickis plants Krumm's eyes into a mummy to frighten people, but they end up stuck.
15a	2a	"Monsters Are Real"	Igor Kovalyov	David Adam Silverman	November 5, 1995	015A	2.09
Ickis makes front-page news when a photographer snaps his picture and now he must retrieve every copy before the Gromble finds out. Note: Gossamer from the Warner Bros. Looney Tunes and Merrie Melodies series of cartoons appeared in this episode where he was shown as one of the best monsters to scare people and animals.
15b	2b	"This is Your Brain on Ickis"	Jim Duffy	Spencer Green & Mary Elizabeth Williams	November 5, 1995	015B	2.09
Simon the monster hunter has Ickis on the brain, literally, when the monster becomes trapped in Simon's head.
16a	3a	"Into the Woods"	Jim Duffy	Story by : Marcy Gray Rubin; Written by : Marcy Gray Rubin, Mary Elizabeth Williams & Spencer Green	November 12, 1995	016A	N/A
Ickis has to rely on his human friend Bradley in order to complete an important group scare assignment or be expelled by the Gromble.
16b	3b	"Krumm Gets the Dreaded Nolox"	Igor Kovalvov	Mary Elizabeth Williams & Spencer Green	November 12, 1995	016B	N/A
Over exposure to air freshener gives Krumm a case of hiccups that will not go away until he is given a big scare.
17a	4a	"Mayberry UFO"	Jim Duffy	Mary Elizabeth Williams & Spencer Green	November 19, 1995	017A	N/A
The monsters become stranded in a rustic town with an angry mob that thinks they are aliens and only one working toilet.
17b	4b	"I Dream of Snorch with the Long Golden Hair"	Igor Kovalyov	Spencer Green & Mary Elizabeth Williams	November 19, 1995	017B	N/A
Ickis and Krumm risk the Snorch's wrath when they steal his prized golden nose hair right from under his nose.
18a	5a	"Garbage Ahoy"	Jim Duffy	Story by : David Adam Silverman; Written by : Steve Skrovan	December 10, 1995	018a	N/A
While frolicking in the dump, the monsters become stranded on a floating garbage barge with no way back.
18b	5b	"Goin' (Way) South"	Igor Kovalyov	Mark Steen	December 10, 1995	018B	N/A
The monsters must journey to the South Pole to scare a hard-to-scare explorer.
19a	6a	"The Monster Who Came in from the Cold"	Igor Kovalyov	Steve Skrovan, Spencer Green & Mary Elizabeth Williams	December 17, 1995	019A	N/A
Oblina goes native when an excursion into the human world, thanks to an experimental human suit, leads the young monster to think she's actually human.
19b	6b	"Puppy Ciao"	Jim Duffy	Steve Skrovan	December 17, 1995	019B	N/A
A stray dog, whom he affectionately names Fungus, follows Ickis back to the dump and they quickly bond.
20a	7a	"The Rival"	Igor Kovalyov	Roger Eschbacher	December 31, 1995	020A	N/A
Oblina becomes a green-eyed monster when a new student named Smelldra arrives and her achievements seemingly outshine her own.
20b	7b	"Hats Off"	Jim Duffy	Mark Palmer	December 31, 1995	020B	N/A
Ickis takes a magician's hat and finds himself in a wonderland of sorts when he falls in and is crowned Bunny King.
21a	8a	"O'Lucky Monster"	Igor Kovalyov	order,s,w Written by : Mark Palmer; Story by : Marcy Gray Rubin	January 7, 1996	021A	N/A
Oblina is convinced she's cursed when she steps on a slug, which is bad luck in the monster world, and it's up to a lucky fish head to convince her otherwise.
21b	8b	"Eau de Krumm"	Jim Duffy	Spencer Green & Mary Elizabeth Williams	January 7, 1996	021B	N/A
A new perfume hits the stores and it causes quite a stink to the monsters who find the smell unbearable.
22a	9a	"Rosh O' Monster"	Jim Duffy	Michael Palmer	January 21, 1996	022A	N/A
The viewfinder is down and now the monsters must tell the Gromble what took place during their last scare, but everyone has a different version of the events.
22b	9b	"The Tree of Ickis"	Igor Kovalyov	Steve Skrovan	January 21, 1996	022B	N/A
Ickis eats an acorn and slowly turns into a tree which is bad enough before loggers start coming around.
23a	10a	"History of the Monster World"	Jim Duffy	Spencer Green & Mary Elizabeth Williams	February 4, 1996	023A	N/A
The Gromble relates to his students the highlights of monster history and how it related to human history.
23b	10b	"Fear Thy Name is Ickis"	Igor Kovalyov	Steve Skrovan	February 4, 1996	023B	N/A
Ickis becomes popular after his newest scare lands him the praise he always wanted.
24a	11a	"Quest for the Holy Pail"	Igor Kovalyov	Story by : Steve Skrovan & Mark Palmer; Written by : Mark Palmer	February 18, 1996	024A	N/A
Ickis must take a perilous journey to retrieve the fabled Holy Pail just as monsters before him have.
24b	11b	"Garbage In, Garbage Out"	Jim Duffy	Roger Eschbacher	February 18, 1996	024B	N/A
A new human policy threatens the monsters food supply when humans stop throwing out their garbage.
25a	12a	"A Room with No Viewfinder"	Andrei Svislotski	Spencer Green & Mary Elizabeth Williams	February 25, 1996	025A	2.34
Ickis accidentally frees the viewfinder and now must find it before the Gromble finds out.
25b	12b	"Krumm Rises to the Top"	Igor Kovalyov	Story by : Lance Khazei, Michael Karnow & Steve Skrovan; Written by : Steve Skrovan	February 25, 1996	025B	2.34
Krumm swallows a helium tank and now risks floating away unless Ickis can save him.
26a	13a	"The Five Faces of Ickis"	Jim Duffy	Michael Karnow, Lance Khazei & Steve Skrovan	March 10, 1996	026A	N/A
Ickis is faced with an impossible assignment -- completing five scares in one day! But can he do it alone?
26b	13b	"Bigfoot, Don't Fail Me Now"	Igor Kovalyov	Mary Elizabeth Williams & Spencer Green	March 10, 1996	026B	N/A
The Gromble and his students must venture into the wilderness to retrieve Bigfoot, who is a monster that allows himself to be seen by humans, before Simon the monster hunter.

=== Season 3 (1996) ===
No. overall	No. in season	Title	Directed by	Written by	Original release date	Prod. code	U.S. households (millions)
27a	1a	"Festival of the Festering Moon"	Jim Duffy	Mark Palmer	September 15, 1996	027A	2.21
The time has come for the students to shed their skins and Ickis shows no signs of the change, which is bad since the last to shed must leave the academy.
27b	1b	"Simon's Big Score"	Andrei Svislotski	Story by : Steve Skrovan; Written by : Carolyn Omine	September 15, 1996	027B	2.21
Simon bugs the monsters literally with a bug-shaped listening device and now his appearances lead to suspicion of a traitor in the academy.
28a	2a	"Krumm Gets Ahead"	Jim Duffy	Spencer Green & Mary Elizabeth Williams	September 22, 1996	033A	2.24
Krumm gets a prosthetic head so he no longer has to carry his eyes, but the new appendage goes to his head.
28b	2b	"It's Only a Movie"	Andrei Svislotski	Mark Palmer	September 22, 1996	033B	2.24
A cutesy cartoon bear has Ickis scared out of his mind, especially when it shows up at the dump when no one else is around.
29a	3a	"Monster Blues"	Zhenia Delioussine	Mark Palmer	September 29, 1996	037A	1.74
Ickis meets a blind human Bluesman who teaches him all about the Blues.
29b	3b	"I Heard the Snorch Call My Name"	Andrei Svislotski	Mary Elizabeth Williams & Spencer Green	September 29, 1996	037B	1.74
Tired of not being able to express his true intellect or talk to Oblina, the Snorch has a voice box implanted that allows him to speak.
30a	4a	"Amulet of Enfarg"	Andrei Svislotski	Story by : Michael Price; Written by : Victor Wilson	October 6, 1996	036A	2.08
Ickis loses the Gromble's prized award when he brings it to a scare and it becomes a human fashion statement.
30b	4b	"Bad Hair Day"	Jim Duffy	Michael Price	October 6, 1996	036B	2.08
A series of pranks costs Krumm his pit hair, but a case of discarded hair tonic could bring it back.
31a	5a	"Who'll Stop the Brain?"	Igor Kovalyov	Story by : Mark Steen; Written by : Mary Elizabeth Williams & Spencer Green	October 13, 1996	028A	2.10
Oblina loses her mind, literally, when her nonstop studying causes her overheated brain to leave her head.
31b	5b	"Cement Heads"	Andrei Svislotski	Steve Skrovan	October 13, 1996	028B	2.10
Ickis frees three monsters from their cement gargoyle prisons, unaware they are ruthless robbers with a grudge against the Gromble.
32a	6a	"Ickis and the Red Zimbo"	Igor Kovalyov	Steve Skrovan	October 20, 1996	029A	2.10
Ickis starts relying on an R/C helicopter to do his scaring rousing the anger of Zimbo, the only flying monster in the academy.
32b	6b	"Oblina and the Three Humans"	Jim Duffy	Mark Palmer	October 20, 1996	029B	2.10
Oblina tells a monster version of the Three Billy Goats Gruff to the Gromble's nephew she is babysitting. In her version, a monster named Anilbo ("Oblina" spelled backwards) replaces the troll and three human brothers named Hans, Dieter, and Udo replace the goats.
33a	7a	"Baby it's You"	Jim Duffy	Story by : Spencer Green & Mary Elizabeth Williams; Written by : Michael Price	October 27, 1996	030A	2.14
A mix-up at a human hospital gives the monsters a human baby and new parents with the Gromble's bon-sty nephew.
33b	7b	"Monsters Are Fun"	Andrei Svislotski	Denise Donner, Mary Elizabeth Williams & Spencer Green	October 27, 1996	030B	2.14
The monsters work overtime to scare the humans when an amusement park ride paints monsters as silly and friendly.
34a	8a	"You Only Scare Twice"	Igor Kovalyov	William Schifrin	November 3, 1996	034A	2.25
An important scare has the monsters after a secret agent who in turn is out to stop a mad scientist bent on world domination.
34b	8b	"Less Talk, More Monsters"	Andrei Svislotski	Spencer Green & Mary Elizabeth Williams	November 3, 1996	034B	2.25
A human contest threatens exposure of the monsters when $50,000 is hidden in the dump.
35a	9a	"Out of the Past"	Andrei Svislotski	Michael Price	November 10, 1996	031A	2.16
The Gromble sees an opportunity to make up for a past failure by scaring someone he couldn't before.
35b	9b	"Ship of Fools"	Igor Kovalyov	Story by : Steve Skrovan; Written by : Mark Palmer	November 10, 1996	031B	2.16
Oblina is left in charge with the Gromble absent and clashes with Ickis during the worst possible time, a flood in the dump.
36a	10a	"Eye Full of Wander"	Jim Duffy	Sib Ventress	November 17, 1996	032A	2.26
One of Krumm's eyes is swallowed by a snake, which ends up in the hands of a heavy metal musician.
36b	10b	"Lifestyles of the Rich and Scary"	Igor Kovalyov	Story by : Mark Palmer; Written by : Roger Eschbacher	November 17, 1996	032B	2.26
Oblina receives an order from her overbearing mother to quit the academy and come home to her rich family.
37a	11a	"Fistful of Toenails"	Zhenia Delioussine & Igor Kovalyov	Story by : Mary Elizabeth Williams & Spencer Green; Written by : Victor Wilson	November 24, 1996	035A	N/A
Old human westerns have the monsters behaving like the characters in them, despite the Gromble's stern objection to the behavior.
37b	11b	"Blind Love, Monster Love"	Jim Duffy	Mark Palmer	November 24, 1996	035B	N/A
Ickis becomes enamored with a Judy puppet from the Punch and Judy Show.
38a	12a	"Wake Me When it's Over"	Jim Duffy	Story by : Spencer Green & Mary Elizabeth Williams; Written by : Ron Nelson	November 29, 1996	038A	N/A
Ickis's scares lately have all been first rate, but the only problem is that they were done in his sleep.
38b	12b	"Things That Go Bump"	Andrei Svislotski	David Regal	November 29, 1996	038B	N/A
Ickis is paired with a new student for a pair scare, but the new student isn't scary... or is he?
39a	13a	"The Master Monster"	Zhenia Delioussine	Michael Price	December 8, 1996	039A	2.17
The Gromble's by the book superior takes over when he finds his not by the book teaching unacceptable.
39b	13b	"Slumber Scare"	Jim Duffy	Roger Eschbacher	December 8, 1996	039B	2.17
Oblina hosts a girls-only slumber party in the dorm room which the boy monsters crash.

=== Season 4 (1997) ===
No. overall	No. in season	Title	Directed by	Written by	Original release date	Prod. code	U.S. households (millions)
40a	1a	"Oblina Without a Cause"	Anthony Bell	Kat Likkel & Denise Downer	August 24, 1997	044A	2.11
Tired of being seen as a stick in the mud, Oblina adopts a new rebel attitude which endangers her during a storm.
40b	1b	"Slick Ick"	Andrei Svislotski & Bob Hathcock	David Regal & Mark Steen	August 24, 1997	044B	2.11
An accident leaves Ickis covered in slippery wax and unable to stay still.
41a	2a	"Showdown"	Jim Duffy	Mark Palmer	August 31, 1997	051A	N/A
Simon hires three of the best hunters to finally capture Ickis, but he must work with his enemy when the hunters decide to take Ickis as their own.
41b	2b	"Internal Affairs"	Jeff McGrath	Kat Likkel	August 31, 1997	051B	N/A
Ickis and Krumm take a fantastic voyage inside Oblina to rid her of a parasite that gives her a monstrous appetite.
42a	3a	"Battle of the Century"	Norton Virgien	Story by : Mark Steen & Peter Hixson; Written by : Mark Steen	September 7, 1997	040A	N/A
Simon unleashes his most brilliant plan to capture the monsters, a giant robot armed with anti-monster weaponry.
42b	3b	"A Perfect World"	Jim Duffy	Mark Palmer	September 7, 1997	040B	N/A
Feeling unnoticed, Krumm moves in with two monsters who show him nothing but attention that soon turns smothering.
43a	4a	"The Lips Have It"	Bob Hathcock & Andrei Svislotski	Michael Price & Peter Hickson	September 14, 1997	041A	N/A
Oblina loses her lips to a human girl looking to stand out in the modeling world.
43b	4b	"Escape Claws"	Igor Kovalyov	Kat Likkel	September 14, 1997	041B	N/A
Ickis brings back a bunch of lobsters to the dump, thinking they were captured monsters, and can't decide what to do with them.
44a	5a	"Walk Like a Man"	Rick Bugental	Michael Price	September 21, 1997	042A	N/A
Ickis becomes stuck in a toilet and his only hope of getting back to the dump is to disguise himself as a human.
44b	5b	"A Friend Indeed"	Jim Duffy	Mark Palmer	September 21, 1997	042B	N/A
Ickis meets an adult monster who is unusual even by monster standards: he has the face of a human.
45a	6a	"Watch the Watch"	Jeff McGrath	Michael Price	September 28, 1997	043A	1.89
A routine scare ends with Ickis hypnotized into believing he is a Texas human.
45b	6b	"She Likes Me?"	Rick Bugental	Victor Wilson	September 28, 1997	043B	1.89
Krumm is dumbfounded when he believes that Oblina likes him as more than a friend.
46a	7a	"Nuclear and Present Danger"	Rick Bugental	Ron Nelson & Kat Likkel	October 5, 1997	045A	1.99
The monsters are mistaken for mutated humans at a nuclear plant and are being chased by scientists who want to study them.
46b	7b	"Loch Ness Mess"	Jim Duffy	Bill Braunstein	October 5, 1997	045B	1.99
The Gromble's hero, the Loch Ness Monster, visits and he is thrilled until he finds himself unable to keep up with his idol's pace.
47a	8a	"Super Ickis"	Jeff McGrath	Michael Price & Mitch Watson	October 12, 1997	046A	2.00
Ickis dons a cape to emulate his favorite comic book hero, but he may end up in way over his head.
47b	8b	"The Substitute"	Jim Duffy	Mark Palmer	October 12, 1997	046B	2.00
The Gromble is absent and Oblina finds his replacement's fun-loving approach at teaching poor and his behavior suspicious.
48a	9a	"The Great Escape"	Zhenia Delioussine & Bob Hathcock	Bill Braunstein	October 25, 1997	047A	N/A
Ickis is taken to human jail when he is mistaken for an escaped convict in disguise.
48b	9b	"Beast with Four Eyes"	Anthony Bell	David Regal	October 25, 1997	047B	N/A
Krumm begins losing his sight and must wear glasses that earn him teasing from the other students until he is the only one able to help them.
49a	10a	"Side by Side"	Jeff McGrath	Kat Likkel	October 26, 1997	048A	N/A
Ickis must work with his least favorite monster, Zimbo, in order to pass an important class.
49b	10b	"Hooked on Phobics"	Rick Bugental	Steve Skrovan	October 26, 1997	048B	N/A
After being injured and humiliated during his last scare, Ickis purchases a phobia kit which gives him success, until he meets a human without a phobia.
50a	11a	"Spy vs. Monster"	Jim Duffy	Michael Price	November 2, 1997	049A	N/A
A drawing done by Ickis is switched with top-secret plans sought by a secret agent.
50b	11b	"Misery Date"	Jim Duffy	Mark Palmer	November 2, 1997	049B	N/A
The gang set the Gromble up on a date with the Library Monster after seeing him swoon over her.
51a	12a	"Clockwise"	Rick Bugental	Michael Price	November 9, 1997	050A	2.32
The Gromble gives the perpetually late Ickis an unusual gift, a clock that can control time.
51b	12b	"Gromble Soup"	Anthony Bell	Denise Downer	November 9, 1997	050B	2.32
The Gromble is sick and his substitute (Conchata Ferrell) is horrible so the monsters try to cure him with an old remedy.
52a	13a	"Laugh Krumm Laugh"	Jim Duffy	Michael Price	November 16, 1997	052A	N/A
Eating a feathered headdress makes Krumm laugh uncontrollably during a multi-academy competition.
52b	13b	"Rookie Monsters"	Rick Bugental	Steve Skrovan	November 16, 1997	052B	N/A
While trapped in a trash compactor, the monsters remember back to when they first met.

=== Crossover episode (1999) ===
Rugrats season 6 episodes
Title	Directed by	Written by	Original release date	Prod. code	Viewers (millions)
"Ghost Story"	Jeff Scott	Written by : Barbara Herndon & Jill Gorey; Story by : James Peters, Barbara Herndon & Jill Gorey	March 27, 1999	103A	5.52 3.36 (HH) (Note: (HH) indicates the amount of households an episode was viewed in when it premiered.)
Note: Aired as an episode segment in Rugrats.
