= Fire and Ice (1983 film) =

1983 animated film directed by Ralph Bakshi

- Theatrical release poster by Frank Frazetta
- Directed by: Ralph Bakshi
- Written by: Gerry Conway; Roy Thomas
- Story by: Ralph Bakshi; Frank Frazetta
- Produced by: Frank Frazetta; Ralph Bakshi
- Starring: Susan Tyrrell; Maggie Roswell; William Ostrander; Stephen Mendel; Steve Sandor
- Cinematography: Francis Grumman
- Edited by: A. David Marshall
- Music by: William Kraft
- Production companies: Aspen Productions; Film Finance Group
- Distributed by: 20th Century-Fox (United States); Producers Sales Organization (International)
- Release dates: January 18, 1983 (Avoriaz Film Festival); August 19, 1983 (United States)
- Running time: 82 minutes
- Country: United States
- Language: English
- Budget: $10 million
- Box office: $860,000

Fire and Ice is a 1983 American animated dark fantasy film directed by Ralph Bakshi. It tells the story of a warrior named Larn who seeks revenge against an evil queen and her son, as well as to save the kidnapped princess Teegra.

The film, a collaboration between Bakshi and Frank Frazetta, was distributed by 20th Century-Fox. Based on characters co-created by Bakshi and Frazetta, it was made using the process of rotoscoping, in which scenes were shot in live-action and then traced onto animation cels.

The screenplay was written by Gerry Conway and Roy Thomas, both of whom had written Conan stories for Marvel Comics. The background painter was James Gurney, the author and artist of the Dinotopia illustrated novels. The American painter Thomas Kinkade also worked on the backgrounds to various scenes. Peter Chung, the creator of Aeon Flux, was a layout artist.

Despite mixed reviews, the film has become a cult classic.

== Plot ==
From their citadel Icepeak, the evil Queen Juliana and her son Nekron send forth a wave of glaciers; this forces humanity to retreat south towards the equator. Nekron sends a delegation to Firekeep, the volcano citadel of King Jarol, ostensibly to request the king's surrender. In truth, the ice queen has orchestrated it as a ruse so that her subhuman troops can abduct Jarol's beautiful daughter, Princess Teegra, whom Juliana feels that Nekron should take as a bride to produce an heir.

Teegra escapes her captors and comes upon a young warrior named Larn, the only survivor of a village that was destroyed by Nekron's glaciers. The two grow close, but are separated when Larn is attacked by a monstrous giant squid, and Nekron's subhumans recapture Teegra. She briefly escapes again, but runs into the witch Roleil and her giant son Otwa, who intend to use her as a bargaining chip for incurring Nekron's favor. However, the subhumans simply kill them and take Teegra to Icepeak. Nekron refuses to marry Teegra in spite of his mother's plan, but keeps the princess as a hostage.

While looking for Teegra, Larn encounters Darkwolf, a mysterious masked warrior who pursues a personal vendetta against Nekron and Juliana. While Darkwolf holds off Nekron's horde, Larn continues his search and comes upon Roleil's remains, which briefly reanimate and tell him how to find the princess. At the same time, Jarol sends his son, Prince Taro, to bargain with Nekron for his sister's release. With Larn as a stowaway on their ship, Taro and his emissaries reach Icepeak. Nekron refuses to release Teegra and insults her, inciting Taro to attack him. Using his magic, Nekron forces the prince and his delegation to kill each other.

Larn infiltrates the ice fortress, but is incapacitated by Nekron's magic, fails to retrieve Teegra and is rescued by Darkwolf. They travel to Firekeep to inform Jarol, who decides to give them time to penetrate Icepeak and rescue his daughter until the glacier crosses the border to his realm, forcing him to release the lava from the volcano to destroy the advancing ice. With some help from Jarol's dragon hawk riders, they assault the fortress, but only Darkwolf manages to reach Nekron. Larn, stranded midway during the attack, finally finds and rescues Teegra from Juliana. Darkwolf resists Nekron's magical attacks and slays him, but Nekron's dying agony expands the glacier explosively, prompting Jarol to open the volcano's valves. The lava flow swiftly overcomes the glacier, obliterating Icepeak, Juliana, and the subhuman army.

Larn and Teegra barely succeed in escaping the cataclysm. When they encounter a wounded subhuman, Larn prepares to kill him. However, Teegra stops him, saying the time for peace has come; they embrace with a kiss. From atop a cliff, a smiling Darkwolf briefly watches the pair, then disappears.

== Cast ==
Character	Performance model	Voice actor
Larn	Randy Norton	William Ostrander
Teegra	Cynthia Leake	Maggie Roswell
Darkwolf	Steve Sandor	Steve Sandor
Nekron	Sean Hannon	Stephen Mendel
Jarol	Leo Gordon	Leo Gordon
Taro	William Ostrander	William Ostrander
Juliana	Eileen O'Neill	Susan Tyrrell
Roleil	Elizabeth Lloyd Shaw	Elizabeth Lloyd Shaw
Otwa	Micky Morton	Micky Morton
Tutor	Tamarah Park	Clare Nono
Monga	Big Yank	Big Yank
Pako	Greg Wayne Elam	Greg Wayne Elam
Envoy	—N/a	Alan Koss
Defender Captain	—N/a	Hans Howes
Subhumans	James Bridges; Shane Callan; Archie Hamilton; Michael Kellogg; Douglas Payton; Dale Park	Ray Oliver; Nathan Purdee; Le Tari

== Production ==
By 1982, fantasy films had proven to be considerably successful at the box office, including The Beastmaster and Conan the Barbarian; further, Bakshi had a desire to work with long-time friend and fantasy illustrator Frank Frazetta. Bakshi received $1.2 million to finance Fire and Ice from some of the same investors as American Pop, and 20th Century-Fox agreed to distribute the film based upon the financial longevity of Wizards.

Because Fire and Ice was the most action-oriented story Bakshi had directed up until that point, rotoscoping was again used, and the realism of the animation and design replicated Frazetta's artwork. Bakshi and Frazetta were heavily involved in the production of the live-action sequences, from casting sessions to the final shoot. The film's crew included background artists James Gurney and Thomas Kinkade, layout artist Peter Chung, and established Bakshi Productions artists Sparey, Steven E. Gordon, Bell and Banks. Chung strongly admired Bakshi and Frazetta's work, and animated his sequences on the film while simultaneously working for The Walt Disney Company.

== Reception ==
On Rotten Tomatoes, the film holds a 60% approval rating based on 10 reviews and an average rating of 5/10. Janet Maslin of The New York Times wrote, "If you love comic books but can't bear the unnecessary bother of turning pages, Fire and Ice [...] may be for you. It would help if you were a sex-obsessed 12-year-old boy, but it isn't essential." Gene Siskel of the Chicago Tribune gave the film two stars out of four and called it "attractive to look at, but its slow-moving, predictable story makes viewing it much like reading a comic book with pages made of lead." He added that "the constant rhythm of Teegra being captured and rescued and captured and rescued is, after a while, more than a bit tiring." Sheila Benson of the Los Angeles Times wrote that "in spite of all the glorious washes in the background, which do indeed have the Frazetta look, Fire and Ice is as unintentionally funny a fantasy as you could hope for." Donald Greig of The Monthly Film Bulletin called the action sequences "impressive enough" but stated that "the animators' fetishistic fascination with the human form ... underlines the two-dimensionality of the script, for the artwork is certainly the only fleshing-out that characters receive."

John Nubbin reviewed Fire and Ice for Different Worlds magazine and stated that "The fight scenes in Fire And Ice are so breathtaking, they almost make one forget the film's total lack of coherence. But 'almost' is not good enough. Despite Frazetta's influence, Bakshi has cut his usual corners, skimped on story, logic, and unity, to produce just another of his pointless animated mushes which looks good in spots, but in the end is not worth looking at in its total."

Colin Greenland reviewed Fire and Ice for Imagine magazine, and stated that "Much more enjoyable is his earlier Wizards, now on video from CBS/Fox, a fantasy with a sly sense of humour. Compared with this, Fire and Ice is a bit glum."

Andrew Leal wrote, "The plot is standard [...] recalling nothing so much as a more graphic episode of Filmation's He-Man series. [...] Fire and Ice essentially stands as a footnote to the spate of barbarian films that followed in the wake of Arnold Schwarzenegger's appearance as Conan."

In 2003, the Online Film Critics Society ranked the film as the 99th greatest animated film of all time.

== Home media ==
The film was released on VHS, Betamax, CED, and LaserDisc by RCA/Columbia Pictures Home Video in 1983. GoodTimes Home Video re-released the film on VHS in 1988. In 2005, it was released on DVD by Blue Underground Entertainment on a limited edition two-disc set, paired with the documentary Frazetta: Painting With Fire, about the film's co-creator and producer, Frank Frazetta. The company later released the film on Blu-ray in 2008 with Remastered 1080p video and a 7.1 surround sound remix in both Dolby TrueHD and DTS-HD Master Audio. The film was released on 4K UHD by Blue Underground Entertainment on June 30, 2026 on a limited edition three-disc set with a Dolby Atmos soundtrack and a bonus soundtrack CD.

== Remake ==
In 2010, Robert Rodriguez announced that he would direct a live-action remake of the film. Bakshi stated that he did not want any involvement with the film, but he agreed to license the rights to Rodriguez. The deal closed shortly after Frazetta's death. On December 18, 2014, Sony Pictures Entertainment acquired the filming rights to the live-action remake version of the film, to be directed by Robert Rodriguez.

== Comic series ==
In July 2022, Dynamite Entertainment announced they would be publishing a prequel comic series in collaboration with Frazetta Girls and Bakshi Productions. In May 2023 they announced that Fables creator Bill Willingham would be writing the series, with artwork by Leonardo Manco. Fire And Ice #1 was published by Dynamite Entertainment in August 2023 with covers by Manco, Bill Sienkiewicz, Francesco Francavilla, Mahmud Asrar, and Joseph Michael Linsner, as well as the original Frank Frazetta poster.

== See also ==
- List of 20th Century Studios theatrical animated feature films
