= List of Æon Flux episodes =

This is a list of all episodes in the animated TV series Æon Flux. The first two seasons are devoid of speech and purposely lack continuity.

== Series overview ==
Season	Episodes	Season premiere	Season finale
Season 1/Pilot	6 (presented as 1 episode on DVD)	June 2, 1991	June 30, 1991
Season 2	5	September 22, 1992	November 24, 1992
Season 3	10	August 8, 1995	October 10, 1995

== Season 1 (1991) ==
Each of the six episodes in the first season was originally broadcast as a 2-minute segment of Liquid Television. On home media releases they are compiled into a single "pilot" episode.

No. overall	No. in season	Title	Directed by	Written by	Original release date
1	1	"Pilot"	Peter Chung	Peter Chung	June 2, 1991
2	2	"Pilot"	Peter Chung	Peter Chung	June 2, 1991
3	3	"Pilot"	Peter Chung	Peter Chung	June 9, 1991
4	4	"Pilot"	Peter Chung	Peter Chung	June 16, 1991
5	5	"Pilot"	Peter Chung	Peter Chung	June 23, 1991
6	6	"Pilot"	Peter Chung	Peter Chung	June 30, 1991
The episode starts with Æon catching a fly with her eyelashes. It then cuts to a battle between Monican agents and Breen forces, with Æon liberally mowing down dozens of soldiers, apparently on a mission to assassinate a Breen official, though most of them are already sick and dying from a strange disease carried by an azure beetle. As hundreds of soldiers die in the sewers, Trevor Goodchild finds and takes in one of the beetles, hiding it in a compartment under his fingernail and carrying it with his lover to the top of the building where Æon's target is sleeping. While going there, Æon sees Trevor and the woman fondling each other and is aroused. As Æon travels on her own path, Trevor uses the infectious toxin in the beetle to formulate an antidote, which he first uses on himself and his lover. Æon has traveled up onto the roof, unwittingly picking up a tack from a loose cable fastening on the sole of her boot. As she prepares to kill her victim, she steps on the tack, stabs her foot and falls from the building to her death. A Monican supervisor destroys her body and incinerates her apartment, while Trevor is hailed as a hero for developing a cure for the virus. Æon appears to ascend to an afterlife and receives an erotic foot massage. A Breen boy buys a foot-fetish magazine with Æon on the cover.

== Season 2 (1992) ==
Each episode of the second season was broadcast as a 5-minute segment of Liquid Television.

No. overall	No. in season	Title	Directed by	Written by	Original release date
7	1	"Gravity"	Peter Chung	Peter Chung	September 22, 1992
Æon and Trevor kiss through the windows of their transports, with the former being in a plane and the latter being in a train. As they do, Trevor uses his tongue to open up Æon's fake tooth and place a rolled up picture inside. After the two of them part, Æon spies an industrial vehicle driving past. Æon then retrieves the picture from her tooth to find it is a photo of a fellow passenger and a suitcase. She climbs out and moves along the side of the plane to spy on the man, who is reading documents from the same suitcase. Æon must jump mid-air to the back of the plane to get inside, but she misses and falls. Realizing she will die from the fall, Æon considers shooting herself, but is distracted by the industrial vehicle from earlier stopping at the edge of a cliff. The workers pull at ropes to bring something to the surface, while an intrigued Æon struggles to keep her binoculars at her eyes. She notices a bridge near the point where she will land, and shoots her grapple at it. At the same time Trevor's train is passing over the bridge, and inside he is kissing his Breen lover. While she swings from the rope, Æon is again distracted by the men salvaging the object, which is obscured from view by the cliff but is glowing brightly. Æon's distraction leads the rope to loop around her neck. A moment before she can clearly see what the object is, her neck snaps.
8	2	"Mirror"	Peter Chung	Peter Chung	November 3, 1992
On an assassination mission, Æon infiltrates her target's home via a maintenance ladder. On her entry, she falls from the ladder, and notices she is spied on by a security camera. While walking down a hallway she notices a room where the security camera recorder is being kept, and enters. She goes to destroy the tape but at the last minute decides to review the footage. The picture is faulty because of a loose video jack shorting against an air vent. Æon goes to fix the connection but spills coffee on her gloved arm. Unnoticed by the departing Æon, footage of another intruder previously entering the building plays on the monitor. While washing her arm, Æon accidentally sprays water on herself in the bathroom's shower, forcing her to take the time to comb her wet hair. Æon then hears gunshots, and evacuates the area to find her target killed. She rushes out of the bedroom, but is then also shot by the assassin. While Æon lies on the floor dying, she looks at the exiting figure in the security monitor, but the image is still distorted. Æon shoots a nearby temperature control knob, disabling the air conditioner. With the air conditioning off, the loose video cable stops shaking, and the security camera picture clears up. Just before she dies, Æon sees the face of her killer on the monitor: Trevor Goodchild.
9	3	"Leisure"	Peter Chung	Peter Chung	November 10, 1992
Æon enters her living quarters to find an empty container of eggs that she was keeping in her refrigerator. She then finds that Trevor, who is in a cupboard displaying masochistic behavior, has eaten them all. Angry, Æon leaves her apartment, but before venturing outside the Monican base, she witnesses another female agent fail to successfully complete jumping through a complex climbing frame. As the other agent walks away, Æon steps up to practice and flawlessly executes the complex routine. Later, she enters a spaceship and collects some of the same eggs seen earlier in her apartment. Resisting the urge to leave, Æon breaks one of the eggs, analyzes the broken contents under a portable microscope, and finds an aggressive embryonic form of a strange alien. The embryo dies as a result of her probing. On her way out, Æon is confronted by an adult alien, but she holds up one of the eggs and threatens to break it if the alien attacks her. She runs away, and the alien triggers a grid barrier similar to the one at the Monican training base. Æon surmounts it with ease, but the alien is far faster and catches up with her. When it catches her, the camera continues as the sound of munching is heard off screen.
10	4	"Tide"	Peter Chung	Peter Chung	November 17, 1992
Æon and her red-clad companion descend from the high floor of a sea base, carrying a key. As the two enter an elevator, they are attacked by Trevor, who is easily knocked out by Æon, but not before he pushes all of the elevator's buttons so that it will stop on every level. She handcuffs him, but drops the floor number attached to the key, forcing her to stop on every level. On each floor, Æon shoots up the stairwell to keep a pursuing Breen soldier at bay, tests the key on that floor's locker, and shoots a distant sky hook that is attempting to latch on to the railing of a small, distant platform just above water level. Each time she exits the elevator, Trevor and the other agent make out, then the agent springs back to either guard Trevor or try to retrieve the number as Æon re-enters. Æon becomes suspicious and sets a trap, exposing their affair. The agent attacks and kills Æon, then comes out on the correct floor for the key. She finds an odd plug-shaped object in the locker; not knowing what it is for, she discards it. Without Æon to keep him at bay, the Breen guard runs down to the small platform, killing Trevor on the way, and helps the sky-hook get a grip on the platform's railing. Just before the red-clad agent reaches them, the sky-hook lifts up the entire platform, revealing an identical plug attached below it. Water rises from the resulting hole, so the base sinks and the agent is left stranded.
11	5	"War"	J. Garett Sheldrew and Peter Chung	Peter Chung	November 24, 1992
The episode focuses on a massive battle between the Monican and Breen soldiers, all of whom resemble Æon and Trevor, respectively. During the course of the battle, Æon cuts down dozens of guards before she is knocked down by a Breen guard who had been playing dead. Æon sees another Monican agent creeping up on the guard and attempts to distract the latter, but the Breen sees the agent and kills both him and Æon. The Breen makes his way into the battle, slaughtering dozens more attackers, before he encounters a long-haired, super-fit Monican agent (called Romeo Svengali in the DVD commentary) with a sword. The Breen tries to shoot Romeo, but Romeo deflects his bullet and kills him. After ensuring the safety of a child, Romeo exits the Monican base and infiltrates a Breen airship, killing more soldiers before being shot by a female Breen agent. She kills several Monican soldiers and infiltrates their base, where she frees another Breen, apparently her lover, from his prison cell. Pursued by guards, they run, but are heading toward a pool of grease caused by faulty equipment when Romeo opened the gate.

== Season 3 (1995) ==
In its third and final season, Æon Flux became a standalone program with each episode given a half-hour time slot with commercials.

No. overall	No. in season	Title	Directed by	Written by	Original release date
12	1	"Utopia or Deuteranopia?"	Peter Chung	Japhet Asher, Peter Gaffney, Mark Mars and Shari Goodhartz; Story by : Peter Chung	August 8, 1995
Trevor Goodchild has "temporarily" taken power in Bregna following the disappearance of the elected president, Clavius. Soon, Trevor enacts a policy of supposed "complete openness", actually a pretext for a surveillance state, as he installs cameras all across Bregna, giving him ultimate control over the people. Gildemere, a Breen soldier loyal to Clavius, is plotting against the new Chairman, correctly suspecting that Trevor was responsible for Clavius' disappearance. Trevor's reasons for the coup are twofold: he gains ultimate power in Bregna, and uses Clavius' body to create an isolated place, locked with a strange ornate key, where he can keep Æon for good, keeping her to himself in perfect privacy. Æon allies with Gildemere and finds her way into Clavius, confronting Trevor and leading Gildemere to his leader, allowing him to free Clavius from Trevor's captivity. However, Clavius is revealed to be completely insane, and Gildemere is forced to kill him. He and Æon then fight, and she easily overpowers him. Accompanied by a news crew and a group of soldiers, Trevor finds the two near the border wall. Gildemere admits to killing Clavius, but publicly condemns Trevor and Æon, claiming the key is evidence of their wrongdoing. Æon, however, demonstrates that the key unlocks her own chastity belt, prompting several soldiers to show that they too have identical keys, apparently discrediting Gildemere's claims and opening the way for Trevor to cement his power. But Trevor's wish to keep Æon to himself is not granted, as she prepared an escape route beforehand and flees across the border to Monica, though she returns her key to Trevor.
13	2	"Isthmus Crypticus"	Howard E. Baker	Todd French and Japhet Asher; Story by : Peter Chung and Todd French	August 15, 1995
Trevor is holding captive two humanoid birds called Seraph-Trevs, the female of which he is trying to seduce. Meanwhile, another scientist named Ilbren is obsessed with the female, even going so far as trying to employ Æon to capture it, offering her the male in return. Their meeting is interrupted by a mechanical tentacle, which Ilbren fends off with a swarm of robot wasps. The male Seraph-Trev is securely held in an isolated chamber, reduced to a state of abject misery due to separation from his mate. Æon plans to free them from Trevor's – and Ilbren's – designs, and to do so employs an old friend of hers named Una to translate directions to the Seraph-Trevs' chambers. Unknown to Æon, Una is in love with the male Seraph-Trev, of whom she was previously sent a picture via messenger pigeon (the male seemingly sent out the bird with the picture as a call for help). Una falls asleep and dreams of the Seraph-Trev rather than translating the directions as Æon asked, but the two infiltrate the base the next day anyway. Una guides Æon through a network of tunnels, but when she realizes Æon's goal is the male Seraph-Trev's chamber, she sets out to find him herself while sending Æon on a roundabout route. Ilbren arrives and ties Trevor up, then makes his way to the female. Trevor breaks free and finds Ilbren with the female, while Una and Æon are arguing in the male's chamber. Æon blows a hole in the wall dividing the two chambers, and the female rushes to embrace her mate, but one of Ilbren's robot wasps escapes and stings her, killing her. The male, though saddened, takes Una, and the two fly off in an ecstatic embrace. Trevor kills Ilbren and, mourning the death of the female Seraph-Trev, tells Æon to go to hell. As Una and the male Seraph-Trev fly through the clouds, a mite from the Seraph-Trev crawls onto Una and bites her, suggesting that she will meet the same fate as the female.
14	3	"Thanatophobia"	Peter Chung	Mark Mars; Story by : Peter Chung	August 22, 1995
The episode starts with a pair of boys play-fighting, while another claps to mimic the sound of heavy punches. The latter boy later flicks a bottlecap into the path of one of the border turrets, activating it and watching the resulting spectacle. Trevor Goodchild is being pressured by the government into making the border more intimidating, despite his want to make people stay in Bregna through the "power of ideas." To this end, he secretly allows Æon to come in and bomb the factory where the parts for the wall are being made. Meanwhile, two Breen lovers, Onan and Sybil, seek to escape from Bregna into Monica through a gap in the frontier. The escape is almost a success, but one of the turrets shoots Sybil in the back, destroying one of her vertebrae. Now she can only stand up straight when a special ampoule is inserted, though when she takes it out she has otherwise impossible flexibility, making crossing successfully a stronger possibility. When Sybil is forced to work in the factory being bombed by Æon to pay off her medical bill, Trevor takes an interest in her and visits her in the guise of a doctor, manipulating her nerves through the gap in her spine to stimulate orgasm. Jealous, Æon indulges Onan in his sexual fetishes while he visits her to find another way of getting his lover across. Eventually, Sybil finds out and angrily refuses Æon's offer of help, telling Goodchild about Æon's secret way into Bregna, and finding out about his resistance to the new border defenses. Trapping a returned Onan in her apartment, Sybil attempts the border crossing again. This time, she avoids the turrets, but before she can pass through the small entrance into Monica, wires trap her legs and robots built with the parts she has been helping to manufacture anesthetize and amputate them, leaving her trapped in Bregna forever. The episode ends with the boys from the beginning fighting each other for real, with the clapping boy sitting nearby, though now his arms are missing, showing that he had tried his cap trick again and been caught by the robots.
15	4	"A Last Time for Everything"	Peter Chung	Japhet Asher, Peter Gaffney, Mark Mars and Peter Chung; Story by : Peter Chung	August 29, 1995
Trevor has perfected a method of copying humans. Determined to put an end to the operation, Æon and her fellow agent Scaphandra, a double-agent for Bregna whose feet have been replaced by hands, cross the border into Bregna. As Æon rushes towards Trevor's base of operations, Scaphandra is captured and taken to Trevor, who takes a sample of her for copying. Æon comes in, frees Scaphandra and interrogates Trevor about the ethics and inner purposes of his operation. Deliberately presenting an opportunity for Trevor, Æon allows him to take a sample of her, though she smashes Scaphandra's sample. After Æon leaves, Trevor copies Æon for himself. This is revealed to be a complex plot by Æon to inflict maximum pain on Trevor by exchanging places with her copy, toying with Trevor's feelings, then allowing her copy to kill her. But as she performs her half of the mission, the original Æon begins to lose herself, developing feelings for Trevor and vice versa. But, while she is still herself, she orders her copy to kill Scaphandra. The copy carries out Æon's request, pretending to cross the border with Scaphandra and hanging back, allowing the turrets to cut down her treacherous partner. The original Æon, who now looks and dresses very differently from her old self, comes and confronts the copy. The two Æons reluctantly go to perform the border run. Trevor, not wanting the Æon he has come to love to die, orders the turrets to be deactivated. The two Æons begin the run, then, as Trevor watches in horror, the real Æon stops and allows the turrets to shoot her, just before they are shut down. Trevor cradles the original Æon's body, shedding tears, while the copy escapes back into Monica.
16	5	"The Demiurge"	Howard E. Baker	Steve DeJarnatt, Peter Chung, Michael Ferris & John Brancato; Story by : Peter Chung	September 5, 1995
Æon and the Monicans have captured an astral being called the Demiurge and are preparing to launch it into space. Trevor, who believes that the Demiurge will bring lasting peace, orders a rescue operation. While the launch is delayed during the battle, the Demiurge shatters the rocket cone, transforms a bird into an avatar, and resurrects Monican soldier Zenith Nader. Æon resists its influence and launches the rocket. Trevor escapes with Nader. At a Monican base, Æon evades questions from Nader's lover Celia and captures the bird. Celia returns to Nader's apartment to destroy a box at his request, but falters when it contains a cat transformed by the Demiurge. She sneaks into Æon's penthouse apartment to steal the bird but falls and is injured when Æon unwittingly kicks her. Æon infiltrates a Breen facility where Nader is giving birth to an infant Demiurge. The infant panics and vanishes, leaving Trevor furious. The new Demiurge appears throughout Bregna while Æon returns to her apartment with Trevor in pursuit. They find the Demiurge there just as the apartment's support cable gives way, demolishing it. The Demiurge heals Celia, who reunites with Nader.
17	6	"Reraizure"	Howard E. Baker	Japhet Asher; Story by : Peter Chung	September 12, 1995
Æon infiltrates a Breen prison where Trevor is keeping compromising photographs of them having sex, with the price of their return being a narghile, an indestructible species that produces a memory-wiping "bliss pill." During her escape, Æon runs into a prisoner called Muriel, whom she accidentally kills after Muriel mistakes her for a guard. After escaping with the photos, Æon encounters and leaves with a Monican named Rorty. Rorty mentions that he was Muriel's partner and asks about her. Æon tells him that she is dead, but not how. Rorty says that years ago he and Muriel took bliss and regretted it. They decided to gather all narghiles and launch them into the sun. Æon and Rorty begin to fall in love, and Æon agrees to join his plan to eliminate the narghiles. Æon takes the final narghile up to the launch platform and finds it empty; Trevor arrives and mistakes her for Muriel. Æon realizes that Muriel betrayed Rorty and turned the narghiles over to Trevor. Æon reveals herself and fights Trevor, who escapes with the narghile. When Æon returns from the platform, Rorty confronts her about the photos. Æon reveals that she killed Muriel and Muriel's betrayal. Æon infiltrates the prison again to find proof for Rorty and recover the narghile. Rorty ascends to the platform and learns that Æon was telling him the truth. He tries to launch the platform, but it is still anchored to the ground by a cable and crashes. As Æon escapes the prison she encounters Trevor again, initially mistaking him for Rorty. She escapes by gliding along the launch platform cable. She returns to Rorty's home and gives him the narghile, but he no longer cares. As she leaves, she remembers the photos and goes back for them. She finds that Rorty has taken bliss, and leaves again in misery.
18	7	"Chronophasia"	Howard E. Baker	Peter Gaffney; Story by : J. Garett Sheldrew and Peter Gaffney	September 19, 1995
The episode begins with Æon lying on a stone slab, waking from a dream in which she was screaming. It then flashes back to earlier, where Æon and Trevor are making their individual ways to a Breen research base researching an ancient virus that apparently causes insanity and formed a basic part of early humanity, until they developed an immunity. Æon is cornered by the Breen soldiers near the base, but is sucked down and finds that, although the base has been there for under a month, it looks like it has been derelict for centuries. There, Æon finds a young boy who guides her through the base and eventually shows her a vial of virus, the only intact vial out of a set of five. There is also a giant fanged baby, which appears to have been the first test subject for the virus, stalking the caves. The episode revolves around Æon's continued replaying of events in different ways and eventual encounters with various fatal situations before waking on a stone slab at the center of the cave system in which the base is built. The reality of these situations is uncertain, and the boy seems to have mystic powers, isolating him from the normal flow of time. After her final waking, Æon is met by the boy, who tells her, "To you, I bequeath my inheritance", causing her to seemingly experience the flow of time. In their final encounter, they are both encompassed by a bright light. The episode ends with a very normal scene, showing Æon in normal, late-20th-century clothing, having just taken the boy in a car to a baseball game.
19	8	"Ether Drift Theory"	Robert Valley and Peter Chung	Todd French; Story by : Peter Chung	September 26, 1995
Æon and her fellow agent and friend Lindze infiltrate a secret Breen base called the Habitat, a place where mutants and artificial lifeforms live in a stable environment, surrounded by a sea of liquid which induces paralysis in any life-form exposed to it. Lindze and Æon are there both to rescue Lindze's boyfriend, a scientist named Bargeld, and to destroy the facility. Soon after they arrive, Trevor and one of his human experiments arrive, destroying Æon's ship in the process, though the experiment is quickly subdued by a swarm of metal-sensitive wasps. Bargeld is terminally ill from an artificial disease and has developed a way of changing the composition of the paralyzing fluid around the base, allowing all the people trapped there to swim to safety. Æon unwittingly spills a corrosive substance that begins to melt the base's walls, and everyone must escape before the paralyzing sea floods the base and traps them all. Bargeld tries to use his device for neutralizing the sea, but finds that the key to activate it is missing. Æon rushes back to find it. Trevor has a device that will allow them to safely escape, but requires two people at a time. He suggests that Lindze and Bargeld use it while he waits for Æon, but Bargeld dies before they can do so. Trevor reluctantly escapes with Lindze, having given Æon up for dead. Æon finds the key, but is trapped by the paralyzing fluid and ends up floating in the sea as the base disintegrates. In a final cruel twist, the key nearly slips into the device as it drifts, but just misses and leaves everyone to their fate, Æon included.
20	9	"The Purge"	Peter Chung	Eric Singer; Story by : Peter Chung	October 3, 1995
Æon chases Bambara, a vicious criminal who frequently maims or kills those he encounters. Æon, ignoring his victims, pursues him through a train and onto a building site. Bambara escapes Æon, killing a construction worker in the process, but is captured for Trevor Goodchild. Trevor inserts a strange robot into Bambara through his navel, and Bambara suddenly loses his darker side, becoming friendly to those around him and quickly befriending an orphan. Trevor says the robot is a Custodian, an artificial conscience of his creation which he hopes to implant in all citizens. Æon then meets up with an organization of women who are opposed to Trevor's project, planning to remove the implanted Custodians and bring the operation to an end. Æon goes after Bambara's Custodian, successfully removing it, although she is drugged and captured by Breen forces. Meanwhile, Trevor takes down the resistance movement. A bomb planted on the train Æon was on explodes, killing the group's leader. Æon then wakes in the middle of a game show, with many of the resistance members implanted with Custodians acting as hostesses and Trevor as the presenter, with two small twin girls. The object of the show seems to be to prove to Æon that she has a natural conscience. It is then that Bambara bursts in, preparing to kill Trevor. Æon pulls a lever that should instigate Bambara's death, but it only reveals that the Trevor hosting the show is actually a robot. The audience pulls a lever and opens a trapdoor beneath Bambara, sending him to his death. Æon leaves, assured by her actions that she has no conscience. But, as she leaves, she sees a Custodian imitating her action with the lever.
21	10	"End Sinister"	Howard E. Baker	Japhet Asher; Story by : Japhet Asher and Peter Gaffney	October 10, 1995
Trevor has designed a satellite called Aldis B, which will help speed up the evolution of humanity, but could also kill off half the living population of the Earth. Æon, determined to stop Trevor from using the satellite, steals and buries the remote. But, avoiding the search parties, she finds a hibernation pod holding a strange alien with removable eyes and psionic abilities, and lacking the ability to breathe or eat, or genitals. The alien is captured by one of the search parties, but saves Æon when its captor throws a fire bomb. Trevor examines the Alien and sees the signs of exposure to Aldis B. He heads off to find the alien's ship, but the alien escapes and follows him, finding both him and Æon at the ship. Aldis B has killed off everyone on the ship, leaving only the alien, who had been awaiting rescue in its pod. Æon and Trevor make love in the ship, while the Alien watches. The next day, the alien finds Æon and offers her one of its own eyes, but Æon refuses. Then Æon offers to show the alien human sexual pleasure. The alien, either frightened or revolted by the idea, leaves and is captured by Breen soldiers. After getting better acquainted, the alien and Trevor travel in a special shuttle to the alien's amazing home world, while Æon decides to await Trevor's return in the hibernation pod. While Trevor learns the alien's psionic skills, Æon sleeps through hundreds, maybe thousands, of years. Waking, she finds a strange beehive-like city has taken the place of Monica and Bregna, with the entire population being aliens. Enraged, and finding Trevor trying to fit in, Æon finds the remote for Aldis B and fires it. Trevor, who now has the aliens' full telepathic power, tells her that the "aliens" are what humanity has become, and that Æon has done what he was about to do in their original time: killed off most of the human race. Æon angrily knocks out Trevor and puts him in the hibernation pod, then travels back into the city and sees the surviving or sickened aliens boarding their ship. Realizing her folly, Æon returns to Trevor and enters hibernation with him.
