= I Love Music =

I Love Music may refer to:

In music:

- "I Love Music" (The O'Jays song), a 1975 disco song written by Gamble and Huff and recorded by The O'Jays, covered in 1993 by Rozalla
- "I Love Music" (jazz composition), a jazz composition by Hale Smith with lyrics by Emil Boyd, first recorded in February 1970 by Ahmad Jamal.
- "I Love Music", a song by Tech N9ne featuring Kendrick Lamar and Oobergeek from the album All 6's and 7's, 2011

In other areas:

- I Love Music (forum), an internet popular music forum founded in 2000
