= Thanatophobia (disambiguation) =

Thanatophobia is the fear of death, more specifically being dead or dying.

Thanatophobia may also refer to:

- "Thanatophobia" (Æon Flux), an episode of the Æon Flux TV series
- "Thanatophobia ", a song by Funker Vogt from the 2009 album Warzone K17

== See also ==
- Necrophobia, the fear of the dead
