= I Love Music (forum) =

Internet popular music forum

I Love Music (ILM) is an Internet popular music forum started by pop critic Tom Ewing in August 2000 as an adjunct to his music website, Freaky Trigger.

Notable posters have included Momus, Simon Reynolds, Philip Sherburne, Drew Daniel of Matmos and the Soft Pink Truth, John Darnielle of the Mountain Goats, Frank Kogan, Ned Raggett, former The Wire editor Mark Sinker, former Village Voice music editor Chuck Eddy, Peter Chung (creator of Æon Flux), Kickstarter co-founder Yancey Strickler, former Pitchfork Media critics Brent DiCrescenzo and Chris Ott and Fluxblog author Matthew Perpetua.

I Love Music shares server space with its sister board, I Love Everything, which was introduced in June 2001. Several other boards contained on the site have sprung up in the years since including All Noise Dude Summertime Fun Board and Pickle Bar, Cape of Good Hope, I Love Books, I Love Games, I Love NFL and De Subjectivisten.

As of February 2013, ILX is hosted on a server (paid for by board users) in Canada. Running costs are paid by yearly funding drives.

== Press coverage ==
Guardian Unlimited described ILM as "a hugely popular discussion board where music bloggers swap ideas and insults." ILM has been mentioned in The New York Times as a "critic-infested" site. Entertainment Weekly ranked ILM 14th on its list of the 25 best music websites. A thread from I Love Music was published in the music writing annual Da Capo Best Music Writing 2002. An ILM thread on M.I.A. was mentioned in articles about her that appeared in Slate and The Guardian, and The Guardian also referred to the forum's discussion about the lyrics of the Jam's "Down in the Tube Station at Midnight" in an article.
