= The Black Tattoo =

2006 young adult fantasy novel by Sam Enthoven

- First edition
- Author: Sam Enthoven
- Cover artist: John Jude Palencar
- Language: English
- Genre: Young adult, fantasy
- Publisher: Doubleday
- Publication date: 7 September 2006
- Publication place: United Kingdom
- Media type: Print (Hardback & Paperback)
- Pages: 498
- ISBN: 978-0-385-60965-4
- OCLC: 70059665

The Black Tattoo is a 2006 young adult fantasy novel by Sam Enthoven. It deals with a boy, Charlie, becoming possessed by a demon that manifests itself in the form of a black tattoo on his body.

The audiobook, read by John Lee, won a Publishers Weekly "Listen Up" Award in 2006 and was picked by YALSA as one of their "Selected Audiobooks for Young Adults" in 2008.

== Plot summary ==
The story begins with Charlie, whose parents are recently divorced, meeting his father in a restaurant with his best friend Jack Farrell. They leave the restaurant, however, soon after entering. Soon afterward, Charlie is unknowingly possessed by a demon, known as the Scourge. He also joins the society known as The Brotherhood Of Sleep, who imprisoned the Scourge in the roots of a tree until one of their own released him. With Charlie's help, the Scourge manages to first kill all the members of the Brotherhood, save for the girl Esme, who has trained all her life to kill the demon. Soon after the death of their members, a possessed Charlie gets into a gateway to Hell, which is essentially a Roman Empire of sorts composed of demonesque species and even gladiator pits. Soon after reaching Hell, The Scourge's true goal is revealed: He wishes to awaken "the dragon" who created the universe, and upon awakening he will destroy it again. Suddenly, it is up to Jack, Esme, and a team of soldiers to stop Charlie and the Scourge from destroying the universe.

== Characters ==
- Jack Farrell

Jack is the main protagonist. He is killed in Hell but reincarnated by God who makes "some changes" though it is not revealed what they really are. It is mentioned that Jack is "part Demon" by his Chinj. Chinjs are small bat like creatures who bond with one specific person (usually a demon) and work as a sort of companion and minor servant. One of a Chinj's powers is that it can regulate Jack's digestive system and transfer needed nutrients to his body

- Charlie Farnsworth

Charlie is the boy possessed by the Scourge. He nearly ends the Universe, but is stopped by Jack and Esme. Initially, the discovery of his demonic powers gives him a sense of strength and invulnerability, as being able to fly, use magic and manipulate others increases his headstrong nature. Soon, the power corrupts his mind, allowing the Scourge to burrow into his darkened soul, controlling him entirely and making him attack his companions. After being transported to hell, the Scourge convinces him that his tattered family and ruined life is not worth keeping and asks him to help him overthrow the emperor of hell instead. However, Charlie believes that he is a counterpart to the Scourge, although he is in fact a simple pawn, a puppet.

- Esme Leverton

Esme is the daughter of Felix who when Esme was conceived was possessed by The Scourge, though this is not originally known. Esme thought her father was Raymond, but on the night she was conceived Felix had magically transformed to look like Raymond in order to get one night of happiness with Esme's mother. She trained her entire life to fight the Scourge, and is extraordinarily talented in the martial arts, flying, and art.

- Raymond

Raymond is a large burly man with a long black beard. Initially, he strikes a resemblance to the character Rubeus Hagrid from the Harry Potter book series. He is a master of martial arts and is also highly trained sword craftsman. He is Esme's father, training her and teaching her the arts of battling demons, however, as he sees his once peaceful daughter become a toned fighting machine, he regrets having started. His method of sword crafting involves creating a blade, then breaking it into shards of metal which he then feeds to several tamed pigeons, mixed with their birdseed. He then collects their excrements, which still have the shards inside them, and melts the pieces down again and feeds them once again to the pigeons. each time the pieces are digested, they are hardened and worn down, becoming more powerful each time. after having collected the shards several times, he finally forges them back into a blade, which has been made close to invincible by the digesting process: this method has aptly named the blade the Pigeon Sword.

- The Scourge

The Scourge is the primary antagonist of the story. An immensely powerful demon created by the Dragon, the Scourge is imprisoned on Earth to stop it from fulfilling its nefarious plan. A vicious, dedicated fanatic, the Scourge plans to wake the Dragon and bring the universe to an end, creating what the Scourge believes to be a "pure, silent Void". The Scourge possesses incredible powers, including (but in no way limited to) telekinesis, mind control, astral projection, flying, super speed, incredible skill in the martial arts, etc. However, the Scourge has one weakness: it needs a host to survive. Although it doesn't necessarily have to stay with the possesses person at all times, it must possess somebody or it will wither and die. The plotline of the novel is motivated by the Scourge's possession of Charlie. The Scourge appears as an intricate web of black tattoos on its host's body, but when in its separated physical form, it appears as a featureless humanoid composed of an inky black liquid.

- The Sons of the Scorpion Flail

They are a team of approximately thirty individuals of several walks of life. They were assembled by the enigmatic *Number One* and have dedicated their lives to battling the forces of Hell. They are akin to a more equipped version of the Brotherhood of Sleep, armed with powerful firearms and advanced technology. They are led by an inept, cowardly soldier known as second-in-command Number Two, who will only take orders from Number One, whom he has never actually met. He dislikes his counterpart, the French gentleman Number Three, who disagrees on his methods of violence and harsh actions.
