= Peter Gaffney =

American writer and editor (born 1959)

- Born: Peter Gaffney; Endicott, New York, U.S.
- Occupations: Animation screenwriter, Television producer
- Years active: 1987–present
- Spouse: Sherry L. Caris

Peter Gaffney is an American writer, story editor and producer best known for his writing work on The Simpsons and Rugrats. Gaffney has had a long and varied career, much of it in children's animation. He is co-creator (with Gábor Csupó) of the series Aaahh!!! Real Monsters.

Gaffney was born in Endicott, New York, the son of computer pioneer John Frederick Gaffney and Carol Crandall Gaffney. He went to Harvard University, where he was a vice-president and an editor of the Harvard Lampoon. He graduated with an honors degree in Folklore & Mythology. After a brief stint in advertising in Southern California, he moved back to New York to become an editor of National Lampoon.

Subsequently, Gaffney spent five years as a writer and creative consultant for MTV. His main job was helping to create MTV's award-winning promo campaigns, but he also wrote the MTV Video Music Awards and live programming for events like spring break and Mardi Gras.

After MTV, Gaffney moved to Los Angeles. The day after he arrived, he received a call from Paul Germain, creator of the new Nickelodeon animated series Rugrats. That conversation was the start of a long career in animation for both children and adults. In addition to Rugrats, The Simpsons and Aaahh!!! Real Monsters, Gaffney has written and story-edited shows ranging from MTV's Beavis and Butt-Head and Daria to Disney's Recess and The Legend of Tarzan. He produced the animated series Nightmare Ned for Disney and Jumanji for Sony.

During this same period, Gaffney worked extensively with Colossal Pictures chairman and Liquid Television creator Japhet Asher. Together they helped realize Peter Chung's avant-garde animation series for MTV, Æon Flux, and working in Barcelona, they developed The Garriris, a series based on the work of the artist Javier Mariscal. Gaffney also collaborated with the late Kevin Curran on a couple of screenplays.

In 2010, Gaffney moved to Lake Arrowhead in the San Bernardino Mountains to be near his father (who died in 2012). At the same time he found sobriety, and for the next five years he worked for Above It All, a rehab facility.

In 2016, Gaffney returned to writing for television. In the years since, he has worked on a number of children's shows, among them T.O.T.S., Thomas & Friends: All Engines Go and Rugrats (2021). He story-edited Bug Diaries for Amazon and Hamsters of Hamsterdale for Nickelodeon.

Gaffney lives with his wife Sherry Caris and their cat Raleigh. He is active in the Empty Moon Zen Sangha and the Southern California Grotto of the National Speleological Society.

== Filmography ==
=== Television ===
- Married... with Children (1991)
- Clarissa Explains It All (1991)
- Rugrats (1991) (1992–1994)
- Beethoven (1994)
- Aaahh!!! Real Monsters (1994–1997)
- Beavis and Butt-Head (1994)
- Æon Flux (1995)
- Jumanji (1996)
- Nightmare Ned (1997)
- Recess (1997–2000)
- Daria (1998)
- Downtown (1999)
- Roughnecks: Starship Troopers Chronicles (2000)
- The Weekenders (2000–2004)
- Lloyd in Space (2001)
- The Legend of Tarzan (2001)
- The Simpsons (2006–2011)
- Let's Go Luna! (2018–2022)
- T.O.T.S. (2021–2022)
- Thomas & Friends: All Engines Go (2021–2025)
- Rugrats (2021) (2022–2026)
- Spidey and His Amazing Friends (2024)

=== Film ===
- Quality Time with Uncle Spike (1987)

== See also ==
- Klasky Csupo
