= Forfeit (film) =

- Directed by: Andrew Shea
- Written by: John Rafter Lee
- Produced by: Sherri James; John Rafter Lee; Andrew Shea; Carol Anne Shine
- Starring: Billy Burke; Sherry Stringfield; John Aylward; Gregory Itzin
- Cinematography: Roberto 'Tito' Blasini
- Edited by: Melissa Shea
- Music by: Andrew Gross
- Production company: Corndog Productions
- Release date: March 9, 2007 (South by Southwest Film Festival)
- Running time: 84 minutes
- Country: United States
- Language: English

Forfeit is a 2007 American mystery thriller film directed by Andrew Shea, starring Billy Burke, Sherry Stringfield, John Aylward and Gregory Itzin.

== Plot ==
Frank O'Neal did something terrible when he was young, but he seems to be a changed man. He is back in the old neighborhood after 18 years, has a steady job as a security guard for an armored car company and he wants the love of his life to give him a second chance. She suffered more than anyone from what he did, but she has never got over him and maybe she still has a chance of happiness. She would have second thoughts if she knew about his obsession with his roommate's height, that he spends every waking moment yelling at one particular television preacher and that he is planning to rob the armored car company of every penny in its vault.

== Cast ==
- Billy Burke as Frank O'Neal
- Sherry Stringfield as Karen Mellor
- John Aylward as Tom Mellor
- Gregory Itzin as Preacher
- Phil Reeves as Hank
- Kirk Baltz as Phil
- Robert Rusler as Jimmy
- Lee Garlington as Sharon
- Chris McKenna as Jake
- Steven Williams as Ed
- Wayne Knight as Bob

== Release ==
Forfeit was premiered at the SXSW Film Festival and appeared at numerous other festivals including the Brooklyn International Film Festival, the Palm Beach International Film Festival, the Breckenridge Festival of Film, the Sedona International Film Festival, the Flint Film Festival, Filmfest Hamburg (international premiere), the Edmonton International Film Festival, Starz Denver Film Festival, the Northampton Independent Film Festival and the Santa Fe Film Festival.

== Reception ==
Jeremy Martin of The Austin Chronicle wrote, "With its plot twists – some of which are pretty smart – plus its religious commentary, creative editing, and casting of Newman from Seinfeld, it's worth more than most films in the mystery-crime genre." LA Weekly wrote that while Burke "manages to make his character's confusion weirdly resonant", Shea "can't seem to decide if he's making a thriller, a boozy blue-collar melodrama or a religious parable", and the film "ends up as a muddled mix of all three".

Justin Chang of Variety praised Burke's performance, calling it "decently sustained", and wrote that while the film "doesn't overstay its welcome", it is an "overworked revenge thriller that's all setup and little payoff". Lawrence Wang of Film Threat wrote that "just past the half-way point of the movie, the pacing of the movie begins to really pick-up as the scenes are directed with more confidence and style and I found myself getting really engaged", but that the film "suffered from an overqualified cast and an unfocused script and director". Popsyndicate.com gave the film four stars and concluded that "as a modern morality tale wrapped in the noir, Forfeit delivers." It added, "For the USA Festival, it is a highlight film."
