= Marton Csokas =

New Zealand actor (born 1966)

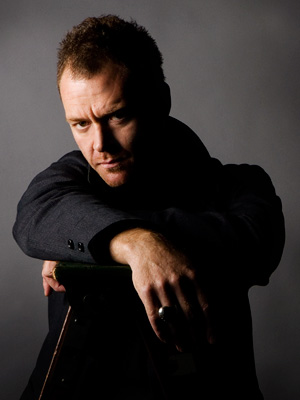
- Csokas in May 2008
- Born: Marton Paul Csokas; 30 June 1966 (age 60); Invercargill, New Zealand
- Citizenship: New Zealand; Hungary
- Occupation: Actor
- Years active: 1990–present

Marton Paul Csokas (/ˈtʃɔːkɑːʃ/, Hungarian: Csókás Márton Pál; born 30 June 1966) is a New Zealand actor of film, stage, and television. A graduate of the Toi Whakaari drama school, he has worked extensively in Australia and Hollywood, along with his native country, and often plays villainous roles.

His notable roles include Celeborn in the Lord of the Rings trilogy (2001–2003), Yorgi in XXX (2002), Guy de Lusignan in Kingdom of Heaven (2005), Trevor Goodchild in Æon Flux (2005), Hora in Romulus, My Father (2007), Nico in Dead Europe (2012), Jack Barts in Abraham Lincoln: Vampire Hunter (2012), Nicolai Itchenko A.K.A. Teddy Rensen in The Equalizer (2014), and Quinn on the U.S. television series Into the Badlands. Earlier in his career, he played Leonard Dodds on the New Zealand soap opera Shortland Street.

Csokas is a three-time AACTA Award nominee, winning Best Actor in a Supporting Role for his performance in Romulus My Father. He was also nominated for Best Male Actor in a Play at the 2008 Helpmann Awards, for his portrayal of George in Belvoir's revival of Who's Afraid of Virginia Woolf?

== Early life ==
Csokas was born in Invercargill, the son of Margaret Christine (née Rayner), a nurse, and Márton Csókás I, who worked as a mechanical engineer for E. Hayes & Sons. His father was Hungarian and his mother had English, Irish, and Danish ancestry. Csokas graduated from Toi Whakaari: New Zealand Drama School in 1989 with a Diploma in Acting.

== Career ==
Csokas made his acting debut in 1990 on the New Zealand drama series Shark in the Park, as Terry Mercer in the episode "Technical K.O.". He also portrayed Leonard Rossi-Dodds in the long-running soap opera Shortland Street from 1993 until 1995. In 1996, he starred in the romantic drama film Broken English; and from 1997 to 2001, he had a recurring role on Xena: Warrior Princess, portraying the character Borias. Csokas also portrayed Lord Celeborn in The Lord of the Rings: The Fellowship of the Ring (2001) and The Lord of the Rings: The Return of the King (2003), Yorgi in XXX (2002), Mr. Smith in Kangaroo Jack (2003), Jarda in The Bourne Supremacy (2004), Trevor Goodchild in Æon Flux (2005), and Guy de Lusignan in Kingdom of Heaven (2005).

Csokas' stage credits include plays by Tom Stoppard and William Shakespeare in the 1990s in New Zealand, and Who's Afraid of Virginia Woolf? (2007) and Peribáñez (2006) with Company B in Australia.

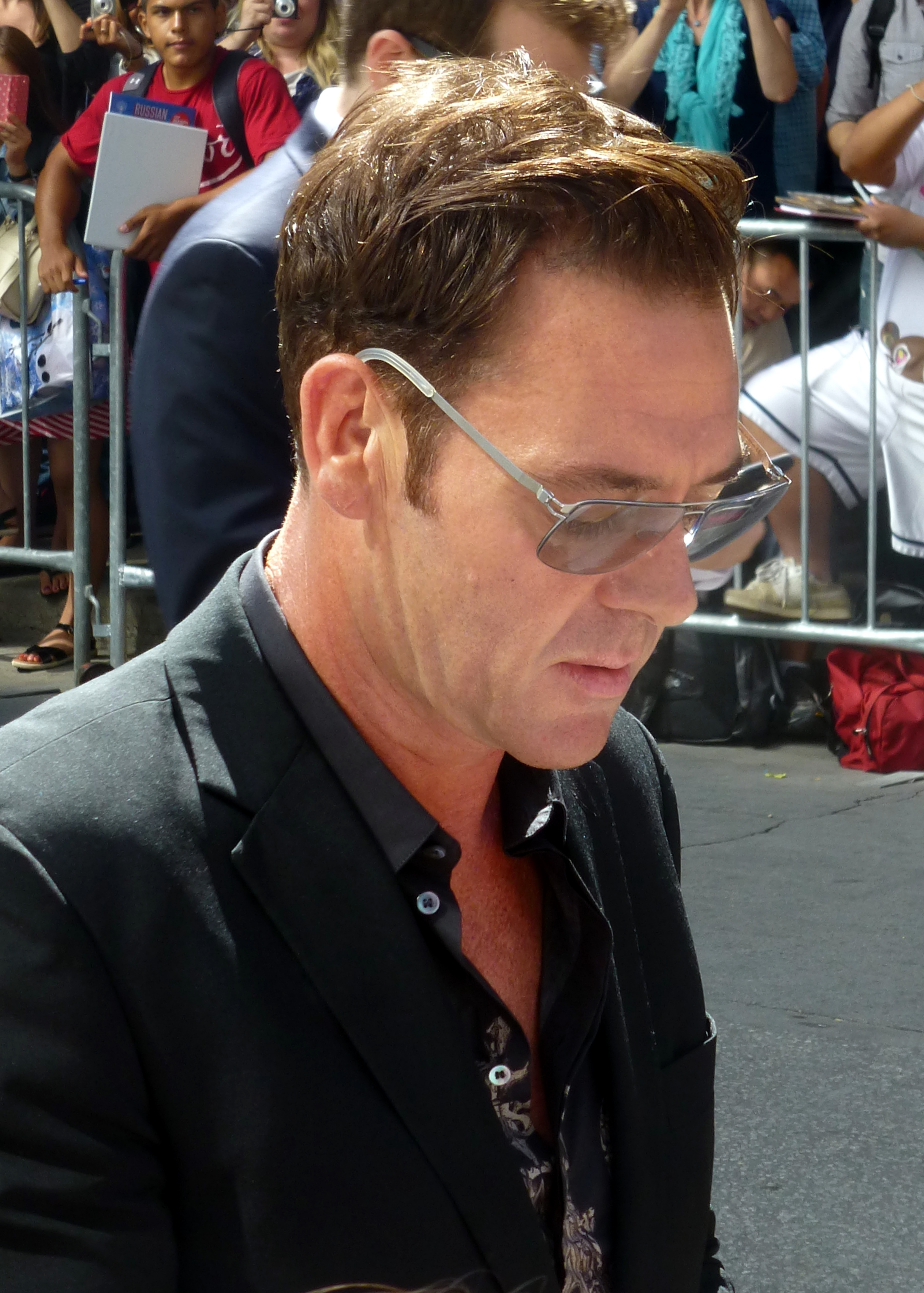
Csokas at the premiere of The Equalizer, September 2014

In 2007, he portrayed Hora in the drama film Romulus, My Father, for which he won an AACTA Award for Best Actor in a Supporting Role and a Film Critics Circle of Australia Award for Best Supporting Actor. In 2012, he appeared in the drama film Dead Europe. For his role in Dead Europe, he was again nominated for an AACTA Award for Best Actor in a Supporting Role.

In 2013, Csokas co-starred in the crime-thriller Pawn with Forest Whitaker and Michael Chiklis, and portrayed Jimmy Laszlo in the DirecTV police drama Rogue, starring opposite Thandiwe Newton. In 2014, he had roles in the films Noah, The Amazing Spider-Man 2, and Sin City: A Dame to Kill For, and as Nicolai Itchenko in The Equalizer. Also in 2014, he starred as the superintendent in the Discovery Channel's scripted miniseries Klondike. Csokas then portrayed General Thomas Gage in History Channel's three-part miniseries Sons of Liberty in 2015.

In May 2015, Csokas joined the cast of AMC's martial arts drama Into the Badlands, playing the role of Quinn, the most powerful baron in the badlands. The show was canceled in 2019 after three seasons. In 2016, he co-starred with Joel Edgerton and Ruth Negga in the Jeff Nichols-directed drama film Loving, and starred alongside Vera Farmiga in the comedy-drama Burn Your Maps. Csokas starred alongside Emilia Clarke in the supernatural thriller Voice from the Stone released in April 2017. He also starred in Mark Felt The Man Who Brought Down the White House with Liam Neeson. In 2021, Csokas appeared in Juniper with Charlotte Rampling and in the historical drama film The Last Duel directed by Ridley Scott.

On 27 June, Csokas was named in the ABC drama Goolagong in the role of Vic Edwards.

== Personal life ==
Csokas holds dual New Zealand and Hungarian citizenship. From 2005 to 2009, he was in a romantic relationship with his Kingdom of Heaven co-star Eva Green.

== Filmography ==
=== Film ===
Year	Film	Role	Notes
1994	A Game with No Rules	Kane	Short film
1994	Jack Brown Genius	Dennis	
1995	Twilight of the Gods	Soldier	Short film
1996	Broken English	Darko	
1998	Hurrah	Raoul Trujillo	
2000	The Monkey's Mask	Nick Maitland	
2000	Accidents	Chug	Short film
2001	The Lord of the Rings: The Fellowship of the Ring	Lord Celeborn	
2001	Rain	Cady	
2002	Star Wars: Episode II – Attack of the Clones	Poggle the Lesser	Uncredited
2002	XXX	Yorgi	
2002	Garage Days	Shad Kern	
2003	The Lord of the Rings: The Return of the King	Lord Celeborn	
2003	Timeline	Sir William De Kere / William Decker	
2003	Kangaroo Jack	Mr. Smith	
2004	The Bourne Supremacy	Jarda	
2004	Evilenko	Vadim Timurovic Lesiev	
2005	Æon Flux	Trevor Goodchild	
2005	Kingdom of Heaven	Guy de Lusignan	
2005	The Great Raid	Captain Redding	
2005	Asylum	Edgar Stark	
2007	Romulus, My Father	Hora	
2010	Alice in Wonderland	Charles Kingsleigh	Cameo
2010	The Tree	George Elrick	
2010	With Love... from the Age of Reason	Malcolm	
2010	South Solitary	Jack Fleet	
2010	The Debt	Young Stefan Gold	
2011	Dream House	Jack Patterson	
2012	Abraham Lincoln: Vampire Hunter	Jack Barts	
2012	Dead Europe	Nico	
2012	Follow Me: The Yoni Netanyahu Story	Yoni Netanyahu	Voice
2013	Pawn	Lieutenant Barnes	
2014	Noah	Lamech	
2014	The Amazing Spider-Man 2	Dr. Ashley Kafka	
2014	Sin City: A Dame to Kill For	Damien Lord	
2014	The Equalizer	Nicolai Itchenko / Teddy Rensen	
2016	Loving	Sheriff Brooks	
2016	Burn Your Maps	Connor Firth	
2016	Dark Crimes	Kozlow	
2017	Voice from the Stone	Klaus Rivi	
2017	Mark Felt: The Man Who Brought Down the White House	L. Patrick Gray	
2021	The Last Duel	Crespin	
2021	Juniper	Robert	
2022	Prizefighter: The Life of Jem Belcher	Lord Rushworth	
2022	Chevalier	Marc René, marquis de Montalembert	
2023	Freelance	Colonel Jan Koehorst	
2024	Cuckoo	Luis	
2024	Sleeping Dogs	Dr. Joseph Wieder	
2024	House of Spoils	Marcello	
2024	Head South	Gordon	
2025	Man with No Past	Soach	
TBA	Fleur †	TBA	Filming

=== Television ===
Year	Film	Role	Notes
1990	Shark in the Park	Terry Mercer	Episode: "Technical K.O."
1992	The Ray Bradbury Theater	Sid	Episode: "By The Numbers"
1993–1995	Shortland Street	Leonard Rossi-Dodds	
1996	Hercules: The Legendary Journeys	Tarlus	Episode: "Promises"
1996	G.P.	Paul Deacon	Episode: "The Ceremony of Innocence"
1997–2001	Xena: Warrior Princess	Borias	10 episodes
1999	Water Rats	Robert Tremain	Episode: "Shark Bait"
1999	Wildside	Larry Lodans	Episode: "2.18"
1999	All Saints	Brother Thomas	Episode: "More Things in Heaven and Earth"
1999	Halifax f.p.	John Garth	Episode: "Swimming with the Sharks"
2000	The Three Stooges	Ted Healy	Television film
2000	The Lost World	Kenner	Episode: "Tourist Season"
2000	BeastMaster	Qord	3 episodes
2000	Farscape	Br'Nee	Episode: "Bone to be Wild"
2001	Cleopatra 2525	Krider	Episode: "No Thanks for the Memories"
2001	The Farm	Adrian Beckett	Miniseries
2012	Falcón	Javier Falcón	4 episodes
2013	Rogue	Jimmy Laszlo	10 episodes
2014	Klondike	The Superintendent	Miniseries; 6 episodes
2014	Covert Affairs	Ivan Kravec	2 episodes
2015	Sons of Liberty	General Thomas Gage	Miniseries; 3 episodes
2015–2017	Into the Badlands	Baron Quinn	16 episodes
2018	Divorce	Skip Zakarian	2 episodes
2020	The Luminaries	Francis Carver	Miniseries; 6 episodes
2026	Goolagong	Vic Edwards	Miniseries

=== Video game ===
Year	Film	Role	Notes
2011	Green Lantern: Rise of the Manhunters	Thaal Sinestro	Voice

== Awards and nominations ==
Award	Year	Category	Work	Result
Australian Academy of Cinema and Television Arts Award	1996	Best Actor in a Television Drama	G.P.	Nominated
Australian Academy of Cinema and Television Arts Award	2007	Best Actor in a Supporting Role	Romulus, My Father	Won
Australian Academy of Cinema and Television Arts Award	2013	Best Actor in a Supporting Role	Dead Europe	Nominated
Australian Film Critics Association Award	2013	Best Supporting Actor	Dead Europe	Nominated
Chapman Tripp Theatre Award	2007	Production of the Year	Closer	Won
Film Critics Circle of Australia Award	2013	Best Supporting Actor	Romulus, My Father	Won
Helpmann Award	2008	Best Male Actor in a Play	Who's Afraid of Virginia Woolf?	Nominated
Joseph Jefferson Award	2017	Outstanding Performer in a Supporting Role in a Play	Uncle Vanya	Won
Sydney Theatre Award	2007	Best Actor in a Play	Who's Afraid of Virginia Woolf?	Nominated
New Zealand Film Institute Award	1998	Best Actor	Broken English	Nominated
