= Freaky Trigger =

Online magazine

- Type: Popular culture, music, news, reviews
- Format: Internet
- Founder: Tom Ewing
- Founded: 1999; 27 years ago
- Language: English
- Price: Free
- Website: freakytrigger.co.uk

Freaky Trigger is an Internet publication and e-zine that focuses on popular culture with topics varying from music to cinema. It was founded by the music critic Tom Ewing in 1999 and features Pete Baran and Mark Sinker as editors. From 2000 to 2005, it also used to host a music-specific blog, titled NYLPM. Ewing also started the popular music forum I Love Music (ILM) in August 2000 as a sister website to Freaky Trigger. A notable feature on the website is Popular, a longtime ongoing series where Ewing reviews each UK Singles Chart number one single ever in chronological order. Popular was later the subject of the Saint Etienne song of the same name.

Freaky Trigger was featured in OC Weekly's list of "10 Crucial Music Websites" and one of its reviews, Eminem's "Stan" by Tom Ewing, was referenced on the list of "The Best Music Writing of 2015" by the Complex. The Guardian have also referred to Freaky Trigger articles, one time on the Freaky Trigger piece "The Strange Death of the UK Charts", and one time on an Ewing piece on Cliff Richard. Stylus Magazine have also referred to Freaky Trigger in an article. The NYLPM blog was notably eulogized by Pitchfork in early 2006, following the suspension of its publication.
