= Nina Munteanu =

Canadian ecologist and novelist (born 1954)

Nina Munteanu (born 1954 in Granby, Quebec) is a Canadian ecologist and novelist of science fiction and fantasy. In addition to nine published novels, Munteanu has written short stories, articles and non-fiction books, which have been translated into several languages throughout the world. Munteanu is a member of SF Canada. She writes articles on the environment and sustainability.

Many of her novels and short stories examine the role and evolution of humanity in the context of nature and technology. She is currently an editor of European SF zine Europa SF. Munteanu taught Environmental Education at the Summer Institute of Simon Fraser University for several years. Munteanu was a scientist with several consulting firms in Vancouver, British Columbia, where she did research and wrote reports and research papers. Munteanu lives in Toronto, Ontario, and Vancouver, British Columbia, where she teaches writing and consults as technical writer and editor.

== Awards and honours ==
Recognition for her work includes the Midwest Book Review Reader’s Choice Award, finalist for Foreword Magazine’s Book of the Year Award, the SLF Fountain Award, and The Delta Optimist Reviewers Choice.

== Works ==
=== Novels ===
- Collision with Paradise (Liquid Silver, 2005)
- The Cypol (eXtasy Books, 2006)
- The Last Summoner (Starfire World Syndicate, 2012)
- A Diary in the Age of Water (Inanna Publications, 2020)

==== The Icaria Trilogy ====
- Gaia's Revolution, Book 1 (Dragon Moon Press, 2026)
- Angel of Chaos, Book 2 (Dragon Moon Press, 2010)
- Darwin's Paradox, Book 3 (Dragon Moon Press, 2007)

==== The Splintered Universe Trilogy ====
- Outer Diverse (Starfire World Syndicate, 2011)
- Inner Diverse (Starfire World Syndicate, 2012)
- Metaverse (Starfire World Syndicate, 2014)

=== Collection ===
- Natural Selection: a collection of short stories (Pixl Press, 2013)

=== Nonfiction ===
- The Fiction Writer: Get Published, Write Now! (Starfire World Syndicate, 2009)
- Manual de Scriere Creativa. Scriitorul de fictiune (Editura Paralela, 2011)
- Scriitorul de Jurnal. Descoperirea vocii interioare (Editura Paralela 45, 2012)
- The Journal Writer: Finding Your Voice (Pixl Press, 2013)
- Water Is...(Pixl Press, 2016)
- The Ecology of Story: World as Character (Pixl Press, 2019)
