= Georgina Harding =

English author

- Born: England
- Occupations: Writer, novelist, travel writer
- Writing career
- Period: 2006–present
- Genres: Fiction, non-fiction
- Notable works: The Solitude of Thomas Cave, The Spy Game, Painter of Silence, The Gun Room, Land of the Living, In Another Europe: A Journey to Romania, Tranquebar: A Season in South India
- Notable awards: Shortlisted for Orange Prize for Fiction; Shortlisted for BBC National Short Story Award; Shortlisted for Encore Award

Georgina Harding is an English writer. She has published six novels and two travel books. She has been shortlisted for the Encore Award, the Orange Prize for Fiction, and the BBC National Short Story Award.

== Biography ==
Harding lives in London and the Stour Valley, Essex.

== Writing career ==
Harding published her debut novel, The Solitude of Thomas Cave, in 2006. She published her second novel, The Spy Game in 2009. It was a BBC Book at Bedtime and was shortlisted for the 2011 Encore Award, a prize for the best second novel. She published her third novel, Painter of Silence, in 2012. It was shortlisted for the Orange Prize for Fiction.

She has since published three more novels, The Gun Room in 2016, Land of the Living in 2018, and Harvest in 2021, which together make up a cycle of novels about the Ashe family.

In 2021, Harding was shortlisted for the BBC National Short Story Award for her story "Night Train".

Harding has also published two works of non-fiction: Tranquebar: A Season in South India and In Another Europe: A Journey to Romania.

== Works ==
=== Non fiction ===
- 1990: In Another Europe: A Journey to Romania
- 1993: Tranquebar: A Season in South India

=== Fiction ===
- 2006: The Solitude of Thomas Cave
- 2009: The Spy Game
- 2012: Painter of Silence
- 2016: The Gun Room
- 2018: Land of the Living
- 2021: Harvest
