= Aaahh!!! Real Monsters =

American animated television series

- Genre: Animated series; Black comedy; Comedy horror; Fantasy
- Created by: Gábor Csupó; Peter Gaffney
- Voices of: Christine Cavanaugh; Charlie Adler; David Eccles; Gregg Berger; Jim Belushi; Tim Curry; Billy Vera; Brett Alexander; Cynthia Mann; Xander Berkeley; Dorian Harewood
- Composer: Drew Neumann
- Country of origin: United States
- No. of seasons: 4
- No. of episodes: 52 (102 segments) (list of episodes)

Production
- Executive producers: Klasky Csupo: Arlene Klasky; Gabor Csupo; Peter Gaffney; Nickelodeon: Mary Harrington
- Producers: Sherry Gunther; Geraldine Clarke; Cella Nichols Duffy; Mark Steen
- Running time: 22–24 minutes
- Production company: Klasky Csupo

Original release
- Network: Nickelodeon
- Release: October 29, 1994 – November 16, 1997

Aaahh!!! Real Monsters is an American animated television series developed and produced by Klasky Csupo for Nickelodeon. It is the fifth Nicktoon after Doug, Rugrats, The Ren & Stimpy Show and Rocko's Modern Life. The show focuses on three young monsters—Oblina, Ickis, and Krumm—who attend a school for monsters under a city dump and learn how to frighten humans. Many of the episodes revolve around their zany hijinks after making it to the surface in order to perform "scares" as class assignments. The series premiered on October 29, 1994, and aired until November 16, 1997. Aaahh!!! Real Monsters continued to air in reruns on Nicktoons until November 26, 2007.

== Plot ==
The episodes follow the suspenseful adventures of Ickis, Krumm and Oblina, three young monster friends attending a monster school beneath a landfill whose headmaster is The Gromble.

The show is set in Hudson County, New Jersey where monsters co-exist with humans, demonstrated throughout the series by the view of the New York City skyline from across a river from their landfill, and in the episode "Monster Make-Over" when Ickis refers to himself as "the ugliest, slimiest, razor fanged, sharp clawed, monster menace this side of Newark!" The monster community includes a working economic system using toenails as currency.

== Episodes ==
Season	Segments	Episodes	Originally released	
Season	Segments	Episodes	First released	Last released
Pilot			Unaired	
1	24	13	October 29, 1994	February 26, 1995
2	26	13	October 28, 1995	March 10, 1996
3	26	13	September 15, 1996	December 8, 1996
4	26	13	August 24, 1997	November 16, 1997

== Characters ==
The four main characters in Aaahh!!! Real Monsters from left to right: The Gromble, Ickis, Krumm, and Oblina.

- Ickis (voiced by Charlie Adler) is a red imp-like monster who is often mistaken for a rabbit, much to his dismay. He is the son of the famous scarer Slickis, placing him under much pressure from the Gromble. Ickis is able to "loom", growing in size, showing his fangs, and turning his eyes red. His constant goofing off, slacking, and blatant disregard for rules are usually the source of his troubles in most episodes. He is the only monster in the show that befriends and takes a genuine interest in humans and their activities.
- Oblina (voiced by Christine Cavanaugh) is a black and white striped monster with a body shape resembling a candy cane who comes from a wealthy monster family and is considered by the Gromble to be his best student. Her methods of scaring humans is reaching within herself and pulling out her internal organs, as well as shapeshifting into various terrifying forms. Oblina can induce nightmares in humans by sticking her finger in their ear and tickling their brains while they sleep. Cavanaugh based Oblina's voice on actress Agnes Moorehead.
- Krumm (voiced by David Eccles) is a hairy troll-like monster whose eyeballs are not attached to his body, and are usually carried in his hands. His most valuable tool in scaring is his overwhelming armpit stench, as well as using his eyeballs. A running gag in the series is that Krumm sometimes loses his eyeballs and has to get them back, once going so far as to make a fake head to keep from losing them.
- The Gromble (voiced by Gregg Berger) is a blue centaur-like monster with two tufts of hair, four legs, a beard, and a tail. He wears a belt around his waist and a red pump on each of his four feet. While serving as the leader and principal of the dump, the Gromble teaches young monsters and evaluates them using the Viewfinder, a chair-like projection device used to replay the scaring activities of students. Along with Ickis, he is one of the few monsters who can hear the Pool of Elders—the source of monster existence, made of the substance of fears.
- The Snorch (vocal effects by David Eccles) is the ogre-like disciplinarian of the Monster Academy who works for the Gromble and is often seen with Zimbo.
- Zimbo (voiced by Tim Curry) is a bee-like monster with a humanoid face with green hair. He is the Gromble's assistant in his class, and is always seen placed on the head of The Snorch. Zimbo is rather petty and jealous of anyone becoming friends with the Snorch, although he, too, has been punished by him for misbehavior.
- Slickis (voiced by Billy Vera) is Ickis' father. He has a similar appearance to Ickis and shares his ability to loom. He was one of the Gromble's favorite students. Ickis often struggles to live up to his legacy.
- Horvak (voiced by David Eccles) is Krumm's father, who wears a black glove after he lost one of his eyes.
- Simon (voiced by Jim Belushi) is a human who is determined to prove that monsters exist and wants to capture them. Belushi ad-libbed much of Simon's dialogue.
- Bradley (voiced by Brett Alexander) is a human boy who starts off on a rocky foot with Ickis, until they befriend each other in the episode ´Simon Strickes Back´.
- Dizzle (voiced by Cynthia Mann) is a tan, crab-like monster. She is friends with Oblina and many other female monsters, and has a crush on Ickis.
- Urbab (voiced by Xander Berkeley) is a brown monster with a long, rounded snout, long ears, pointy fangs, and yellow eyes. He has two arms and two legs, each with two digits (occasionally shown with three toes).
- Kriggle (voiced by Dorian Harewood) is a hippo/bug-like monster. He is a grayish-purple color, two antennae, has a large mouth, and two thick arms and legs, each with three digits. He is best friends with Urbab.

== Production ==
Aaahh!!! Real Monsters was created by Gábor Csupó and Peter Gaffney, and was the third animated series produced by Csupó's company Klasky Csupo, which also created the animated shows Rugrats and Duckman on USA Network. Before the final title was chosen, which took over five years, the series had the working titles Monsters and Real Monsters. The show was conceived after Csupó and his wife and creative partner Arlene Klasky were approached by the network Nickelodeon to create a follow-up series to Rugrats. Csupó was inspired to write a show about monsters because his own young children loved them. He also said he knew Nickelodeon would not want a series about human characters because everybody else was pitching shows about animals. Csupó drew some sketches of possible monsters on a piece of paper and successfully pitched the idea to the network: "I wanted them silly and not too skillful – and the idea worked."

Nickelodeon programming director Herb Scannell said the character design in Aaahh!!! Real Monsters was partially inspired by Yellow Submarine, a 1968 animated film that was, in turn, inspired by The Beatles. The character Gromble, in particular, bears a close resemblance to the Blue Meanie characters from that film. Director of the series Igor Kovalyov said the style was inspired by his earlier Soviet film Investigation Held by Kolobki which he and Gábor Csupó showed to the producers who then gave Kovalyov's team a lot of creative freedom with the art direction and storyboarding. Csupó said some elements of the show have a look similar to the film noir genre, and called the city dump where the monster characters reside reminiscent of the visual style from the films Blade Runner (1982) and Brazil (1985). The characters guest-star in the 1999 Rugrats episode "Ghost Story". Before that, David Eccles, the voice of Krumm, provided the monster voice coming from under Chuckie's bed.

== Reception ==
=== Reviews ===
Reviews for Aaahh!!! Real Monsters were very positive. Josef Adalian of The Washington Times praised the show's animation and sense of humor, although it was not as "hip and witty" as The Ren & Stimpy Show or The Simpsons. Although he felt the show would appeal to children over nine as well as adults, he said it may not appeal to those who "react negatively to semi-scary sights and gags about body odor, physical punishment or abusive older siblings". USA Today writer Matt Roush called it "garish and blissfully silly" and praised the show's "outrageous characters have just enough Ren & Stimpy grodiness, but tempered with exceptional sweetness". Ginny Holbert of the Chicago Sun-Times called it a "cute and clever" series with "wit and inventive creatures", and compared the animation to the work of artist Peter Max. Gannett News Service writer Mike Hughes called it a "terrific cartoon series", and said the show's "wildly perverse humor" had a "distinctly European style" that reflected Gábor Csupó's Hungarian background.

The Plain Dealer writer Tom Feran called the show "good fun" and favorably compared the series' premise to that of the animated film The Nightmare Before Christmas. Boston Herald writer Frances Katz wrote, "If there was ever a great title for a cartoon, it has to be Nickelodeon's Aaahh!!! Real Monsters'." Not all reviews were positive. The November 1994 issue of Parenting magazine listed Aaahh!!! Real Monsters as #1 in its top ten list of the worst new shows of the television season, describing it as "Graphic and scatological; it's just plain gross." Some media outlets pointed out similarities between Aaahh!!! Real Monsters and The Brothers Grunt, an MTV animated television series created by Danny Antonucci about a group of grotesque humanoid characters. Gábor Csupó rejected these comparisons and claims his show was more story- and character-driven with a different visual style, while Antonucci's show was idea-driven. Csupó did not want Aaahh!!! Real Monsters to be lumped together with The Brothers Grunt, especially since that show received low ratings and negative reviews, lasting for 8 months, and that Danny Antonucci called it "MTV's dirty little secret".

=== Awards ===
The pilot episode of Aaahh!!! Real Monsters won first prize for film animation producer for television at both the Houston Film Festival and Ottawa Film Festival. The series was nominated for a Daytime Emmy Award for Outstanding Achievement in Animation in 1995 alongside Rugrats, Animaniacs, Where on Earth Is Carmen Sandiego? and 2 Stupid Dogs. The award ultimately went to Rugrats.

== Merchandising ==
Mattel produced a series of Aaahh!!! Real Monsters action figures in 1995. They each stand approximately 4 inches (10 cm) tall and include an action feature. Other products based on the cartoon include Fleer trading cards, books, plush toys, pens, hats, backpacks, notepads, cups, gum, and videos. At one point, General Mills also included small promotional flip books of Ickis, Krumm, Oblina, and The Gromble in its Cinnamon Toast Crunch breakfast cereal.

=== Home media releases ===
In 1995, selected episodes of Aaahh!!! Real Monsters were released on VHS by Sony Wonder. Paramount Home Video re-released the tapes in 1997. The complete first and second seasons were released for PlayStation Network for viewing on the PlayStation 3 and PSP (PlayStation Portable) systems.

Nickelodeon and Amazon.com teamed up to release Aaahh!!! Real Monsters and other Nickelodeon shows on manufactured-on-demand DVD-R discs available exclusively through Amazon.com's CreateSpace arm.

CreateSpace releases	Release date	Discs	Episodes
Season 1	August 10, 2010	3	13
Season 2	December 1, 2010	3	13
Season 3	December 1, 2010	3	13
Season 4	December 1, 2010	3	13

Aaahh!!! Real Monsters sets, among others, were discontinued when Nick began releasing traditional DVDs of many of their series in association with Shout! Factory.

On March 22, 2011, it was announced that Shout! Factory had acquired the home video rights to the series from Nickelodeon. They have subsequently released the first three seasons on DVD. The fourth and final season was released on June 10, 2014, as a Shout! Select title.

On October 8, 2013, Shout! Factory released the complete series set in Region 1.

Shout Factory releases	Release date	Discs	Episodes
Season 1	October 5, 2011	2	13
Season 2	May 15, 2012	2	13
Season 3	September 11, 2012	2	13
Season 4 (Note: Shout! Factory select title, sold exclusively through Shout's online store.)	June 10, 2014	2	13
The Complete Series	October 8, 2013	8	52

In the United Kingdom, four volumes are available as exclusive releases in Poundland stores. Volume 1 contains the first nine episodes (five half-hours) from season 1. Volume 2 contains the first eight episodes (four half-hours) from season 2, while the remaining two volumes make up the first 16 episodes from season 3.

=== Video games ===
A video game based on the TV series was released for the Super NES and Sega Mega Drive/Genesis. The game was developed by Realtime Associates and published by Viacom New Media in 1995. Ickis also appears in Nicktoons Racing for the PlayStation, PC, and Game Boy Advance yet is missing from the Game Boy Color version. Oblina has a cameo in all versions of Nicktoons Racing except the Game Boy Color version.

The characters are also created in full 3D for Microsoft's Nickelodeon 3D Movie Maker.

Krumm appears as a Master Model in the Wii, PlayStation 2, and Game Boy Advance versions of Nicktoons: Attack of the Toybots while The Gromble is a Master Model in the Nintendo DS version.

Oblina and Krumm make a cameo appearance in the video game Nicktoons MLB.

Oblina is a playable character in the 2021 fighting video game Nickelodeon All-Star Brawl and the 2022 kart racing game Nickelodeon Kart Racers 3: Slime Speedway, voiced by Alex Cazares due to the retirement and death of her original voice actress, Christine Cavanaugh.
