= Æon Flux =

American science fiction animated TV series (1991–1995)

- Cover of the 2005 DVD box set
- Genre: Adventure; Avant-garde; Science fiction
- Created by: Peter Chung
- Voices of: Denise Poirier; John Rafter Lee; Julia Fletcher
- Composer: Drew Neumann
- Country of origin: United States
- Original languages: Silent (seasons 1–2); English (season 3)
- No. of seasons: 3
- No. of episodes: 21 (list of episodes)

Production
- Executive producers: Japhet Asher; Abby Terkuhle
- Producer: Catherine Winder
- Running time: Season 1: 2 minutes (6 parts); Season 2: 3–5 minutes (5 episodes); Season 3: 30 minutes with commercials (10 episodes)
- Production companies: Colossal Pictures; MTV Animation

Original release
- Network: MTV
- Release: November 30, 1991 – October 10, 1995

Related
- Liquid Television

Æon Flux (/ˌiːɒn ˈflʌks/) is an American adult animated avant-garde science-fiction adventure television series that aired on MTV from November 30, 1991 until October 10, 1995. It premiered on MTV's Liquid Television experimental animation show as a six-part serial, followed in 1992 by five individual short episodes. In 1995, a season of ten half-hour episodes aired as a stand-alone series. Æon Flux was created by Korean animator Peter Chung. Each episode's plot has elements of social science fiction, biopunk, dystopian fiction, spy fiction, psychological drama, postmodern and psychedelic imagery, and Gnostic symbolism.

The live-action movie Æon Flux, loosely based upon the series and starring Charlize Theron, was released in theaters on December 2, 2005, preceded in November of that year by a tie-in video game of the same name – based mostly on the movie but containing some elements of the original television series.

== Plot ==
Æon Flux is set in a surreal German Expressionist-style future. The setting depicts a bizarre dystopia populated by mutant creatures, clones and robots, set within two city-states, Monica and Bregna (/ˈbrɛnjə/), separated by a border wall in an otherwise barren earth-like world. The title character is a scantily clad dominatrix/secret agent from Monica — skilled in espionage, assassination and acrobatics. She infiltrates and sabotages installations in Bregna, which is led by her sworn enemy, and sometime lover, Trevor Goodchild — the technocratic dictator of Bregna, whose citizens are called Breens. The two nations engage in a futile, never-ending war for ideological supremacy. Monica is portrayed as an anarchistic or libertarian society where there is absolute freedom and individualism. Bregna is shown as a totalitarian regime and an Orwellian police state with an oppressed society under constant surveillance, rules and regulations. Themes of tragic/forbidden love run throughout the series; Trevor has everything, but what he truly wants is Æon, and Æon can accomplish anything she wants except settling down with Trevor.

== Voice cast ==
=== Main cast ===
- Denise Poirier as Æon Flux
- John Rafter Lee as Trevor Goodchild

=== Guest cast ===
- Japhet Asher as Clavius (Director's Cut)
- Andrea Carvajal as Una
- Steffan Chirazi as Bambara
- Morgan Creaves as Rordy
- Shawn Cuddy as Celia
- Joseph Drelich as Clavius (original airing)
- Taichi Erskine as Boy
- Alex Fernandez as Aemon
- Julia Fletcher as Benzenhurst
- Kelly Gabriel as Lindze
- Christianne Hauber as Principal Lorna
- Mark Mars as Sinnah
- Matt K. Miller as Ilbren
- C. W. Morgan as Bargeld
- Adam Paul as Nadir Zenith
- Paul Raci as Onan
- Elizabeth Sampson as Hedrick
- Patrick Stretch as Gildemere
- Susan Turner-Cray as Hostess Judy
- Grace Whitefeather as Sybil

== Development ==
Some authors consider the title a reference to the Gnostic notion of an Aeon, noting the influence in the use of a demiurge in one episode, and that the relationship between the main characters parallels the Valentinian notion of a syzygy. Peter Chung, the creator, says the main character's name "started out just being the name of the cartoon and then eventually it stuck, so that's her name." The character Æon Flux was not meant to be part of the series, but MTV pushed to keep her in it, despite Æon dying at the end of the first batch of shorts. Chung intended the cartoon to be a reaction to heroic Hollywood action films, not as a spoof, but rather as a way to make the audience wonder about the wider context of these action heroes and evoke thought. Æon Flux is therefore notable as the first American adult animated series to be a drama rather than a comedy.

One peculiarity of the early shorts is the violent death of Æon Flux, which occurs in each installment. According to the commentary by Peter Chung in the 2005 DVD release, she dies in every short episode after the initial six-part pilot because he never intended to make more episodes and felt the best solution was to have her keep dying; by contrast, she only "dies" once in the half-hour series. Often her death is caused by fate, while other times she dies due to her own incompetence. One of the half-hour episodes, "A Last Time for Everything", ends with the original Æon being killed and replaced by an identical clone. (In the episode "Chronophasia", Æon is apparently killed repeatedly by a monstrous baby, but the reality of these events is ambiguous. In "Ether Drift Theory", Æon is suspended indefinitely in an inanimate state, but remains technically alive.)

=== Style ===
Chung describes the style of the show as "academic": "I was interested in experimenting with visual narrative, telling a story without dialogue and also trying to create a style of telling a story with animation that wasn't influenced by the usual kinds of things that you see." Æon Flux depicts graphic violence and sexuality, including fetishism and domination. The featurette Investigation: The History of Æon Flux (included on the 2005 DVD release) notes that Peter Chung had worked on Rugrats prior to Æon Flux, and had become extremely frustrated by the limitations of the characters. Chung says the visual style was influenced by Hergé, ligne claire, Egon Schiele, and Moebius.

With the exceptions of the exclamation "No!" in the pilot and the single word "plop" in the episode "Leisure", all of the short episodes are completely devoid of intelligible speech. Instead, the sound track employs a variety of sound effects, including sounds such as laughter, grunts, and sighs. It would not be until the beginning of Season 3 that dialogue would be used much more extensively.

=== Music ===
The music and sound design for the original television series was created by Drew Neumann, who also created music for Aaahh!!! Real Monsters and The Grim Adventures of Billy & Mandy. Peter Stone (of Xorcist) served as assistant sound editor for the original MTV series.

The music was later released on CD by Klasky Csupo's record label, Tone Casualties, titled Eye Spy – Ears Only: Confidential. The initials "AF" were used on song titles and in the credits to replace the words "Æon Flux" due to the lack of licensing permissions from MTV. The album includes two discs worth of material from the series as well as the canceled original (1995) video game.

An abbreviated edition of the album's first disc, titled Æon Flux: Music from the Animated Series, was included as a bonus with the 2005 DVD set at Best Buy. This edition included 11 pieces of score, with dialogue snippets featuring Æon and Trevor interspersed as standalone tracks.

Neumann self-released an expanded, remastered version of the album, retitled Eye Spy: Declassified, Freedom of Information Act, as a digital download in 2010, with new artwork by Peter Chung and a previously unreleased third volume of music. This edition was reissued by Waxwork Records on vinyl, digital download, and streaming on February 17, 2023, and on CD the following April, as Æon Flux: Original Soundtrack.

A soundtrack to the live action film was composed by Graeme Revell.

== Broadcast history ==
MTV was the exclusive broadcaster of the series in the United States. In Canada, the shorts aired on MuchMusic and the third season aired a year or so later on the youth-oriented network YTV, in a late-night timeslot, during a period when the network was trying to appeal to an older audience. In Australia and New Zealand, during the early to mid-1990s, the Liquid Television shorts and the first series were shown on the program Eat Carpet on SBS television. In Southeast Asia the third season was broadcast in 1996 via the MTV Southeast Asia channel, which at the time was free to anyone with a satellite dish. In the UK, MTV first showed the shorts and the 30-minute episodes from 1992. In the mid-1990s, the BBC showed the Liquid Television shorts, which included all of the Æon Flux shorts. Locomotion played the third season repeatedly, between 1998–1999 and 2002–2003, in Spanish and Portuguese for Latin America. The series was also aired on Norwegian channel NRK2, a sister channel to state channel NRK, alongside The Maxx, Phantom 2040, and The Head in the late 1990s. Teletoon Detour also aired it with The Maxx.

In the lead-up to the 2006 international release of Æon Flux on DVD and the live-action movie, MTV UK replayed the third season of Æon Flux from October to November in 2005. The episodes were played at 2 a.m. on weeknights. MTV Australia followed with replays of the third season beginning in December 2005, scheduled at 1 a.m. on weeknights. The episodes were titled Æon Flux Animation, and they were not played in the original order from 1995.

As of 2009, MTV2 shows Æon Flux shorts as a part of the block MTV2 Legit. During January and February 2011, Æon Flux was aired once again in El Salvador on VH1, in English language with Spanish subtitles. The half-hour episodes once again resurfaced on MTV Classic in 2016, shortly before that station switched to an all-video format.

== Home media ==
Overview of Æon Flux home media releases
Release date	Format	Title	Contents
1996	VHS	Æon Flux	Shorts: "Gravity", "Leisure", "Tide", "War", Pilot; "Thanatophobia"; "A Last Time for Everything"; "The Purge"; "Isthmus Crypticus"
1997	DVD	Æon Flux	Shorts: "Gravity", "Leisure", "Tide", "War", Pilot; "Thanatophobia"; "A Last Time for Everything"; "The Purge"; "Isthmus Crypticus"
1997	VHS	Æon Flux: Mission Infinite	"Reraizure"; "Chronophasia"; "End Sinister"
1998	VHS	Æon Flux: Operative Terminus	"Utopia or Deuteranopia"; "The Demiurge"; "Ether Drift Theory"; Short: "Mirror"
1998	3×VHS	Æon Flux: Complete	Box set of previous VHS releases
November 22, 2005	3×DVD	Æon Flux: The Complete Animated Collection	All shorts and episodes in director's cut form
January 22, 2008	2×UMD	Æon Flux: The Complete Animated Collection	All shorts and episodes in director's cut form

=== VHS ===
The series was issued across three VHS tapes between 1996 and 1998, which were later collected in a box set. Some of the shorts also appeared on a Best of Liquid Television compilation.

=== DVD and UMD ===
The first VHS volume was issued on DVD in 1997.

The complete series was collected in a 3-DVD set on November 22, 2005. These DVDs featured new director's cuts of several episodes, with added special effects, and in a few cases, new dialogue intended to improve character continuity between episodes. Among the many changes to the dialogue in the DVD release, the voice of the character Clavius in the episode "Utopia or Deuteranopia", originally recorded by voice actor Joseph Drelich, was re-recorded by series executive producer Japhet Asher.

The DVD set includes two featurettes and audio commentary on several episodes. It also features a promotional video for the movie's tie-in video game, in the narrative style of the Liquid Television shorts but animated in CGI. The short sees Æon (with Theron's likeness) on a mission, killing many Breen soldiers while pursuing some small, insect-like robots. Like the original shorts, it ends with Æon's accidental death.

The set was released, with reduced special features, on UMD for the PlayStation Portable in January 2008.

== Reception ==
Reviewing the 2005 DVD release, IGN gave the series 9 out of 10, while giving the whole package (shorts, extras and general condition included) a 7 out of 10.

CyberpunkReview.com gave the series a glowing review, saying the series was "one of the really creative shows to come out of United States Television. This show validates the purpose of cable TV—we get to see talented folks like Peter Chung let loose their creative energies to produce something truly unique."

Nina Munteanu of Europa SF reviewed and compared both the movie and the series; she said that while the movie sacrificed character development in pursuit of a coherent story, the series chose the path of deep characters and themes. She summed up by saying, "While the film's moralistic tale resonated and lingered like a muse's long forgotten poem, the subversive kick of the comic [sic] series (which I thankfully saw later) struck deep chords and left me breathless with questions."

On the review aggregator website Rotten Tomatoes, the show holds an average rating of 90%. The first season holds a score of 100% based on 7 reviews, while the third season holds a score of 80% based on 10 reviews.

== In other media ==
=== Film ===
An Æon Flux Hollywood adaptation, which was released in the United States on December 2, 2005, starring Charlize Theron, provoked controversy among Æon Flux fans over initial reports that the film adaptation seemed to bear little resemblance to the original full-length animated series or the Liquid Television shorts, as no one involved with the original television series had a role in the making of the film. While it does take a number of major liberties with the character and concept of the series (such as making the character of Una into Æon's sister and giving Trevor a brother who plays a major role), the film also incorporates characters, themes, gadgets, and even specific scenes as featured in the television version, most notably a reenactment of the television show's most iconic image: Æon trapping a fly in her eyelashes. The film became a critical and box office flop.

The creator of Æon Flux, Peter Chung, gave an interview to the "Monican Spies" community on LiveJournal in 2006. He was asked many questions about Æon Flux and her universe, including how he really felt about the movie. Chung called the movie "a travesty", relating that its public screening made him feel "helpless, humiliated, and sad". He described his primary objection to the film as being its portrayal of the Æon and Trevor characters and their re-imagined history and relationship. Chung went on to state, "Ms. Flux does not actually appear in the movie."

=== Comics ===
A "graphic novel" called Æon Flux: The Herodotus File, which actually consisted of an assortment of false documents from the world of Æon Flux and a short story-board-style sequence described as "security camera footage" rather than a comic strip story, was published in 1995. In it, authors Mark Mars and Eric Singer provided vague explanations of some of the show's setting and backstory, including how Trevor and Æon met. One hint suggested in the series, and confirmed by Mars and Singer in the graphic novel, is the character's foot fetish modeling; it is suggested that she augments her income posing barefoot for magazines devoted to the fetish. The graphic novel fell out of print in the years that followed the show's conclusion, but it was temporarily re-issued in 2005, with new cover art, to tie in with the movie.

As another tie-in to the movie, Dark Horse Comics published a four-issue comic book mini-series, collected as a trade paperback and written and drawn by Mike Kennedy and Timothy Green III, who based their work upon the film versions of the Æon Flux characters. Although the characters and situations were based on the newer movie versions, the penciling technique deliberately emulated Peter Chung's unique style from the TV series.

=== Pepsi commercial ===
Though not directly connected to the series, a live-action/animated Diet Pepsi commercial titled "Something Wrong?" was directed by Peter Chung and starred Malcolm McDowell as a Trevor Goodchild-like character and Cindy Crawford as an Æon Flux-like character. It was made for Super Bowl XXX in 1996, but was pulled and later aired for broadcast exclusive to MTV. "Something Wrong?" is available online at YouTube.

=== Video games ===
==== Released 2005 game ====
To coincide with the release of the 2005 film, Majesco and developer Terminal Reality released a video game adaptation on Xbox and PlayStation 2. While primarily based on the film, elements from both the movie and the television series are included, as the game sets out to be something of a canonical link between the two, although the Æon character in the game is modeled only after Theron and is also voiced by her.

==== Unfinished 1996 game ====
A game based on the original animated series was announced on April 9, 1996 for the PlayStation. The game, which was loosely based on "The Demiurge" episode, was being developed by Cryo Interactive and published by Viacom New Media. The game first made an appearance at E3 that same year, with Æon Flux creator Peter Chung on hand to promote it, and commercial advertising was even included in the 1996 VHS release of the animated series. A developer build of it was leaked, and pictures of this build can be found on various websites.

Viacom New Media would merge with Virgin Interactive midway through the game's development. The merger ultimately led to the cancellation of Viacom's in-development games, leaving Cryo without the rights to use the Æon Flux property. In mid-1997, the Æon Flux video game rights were acquired by GT Interactive. The game's assets were then reworked into the 1997 title Pax Corpus after being stripped of all copyrighted association with Æon Flux. Pax Corpus does retain obvious similarities to the original animated series, e.g. parts of the plot are similar to the episode "The Demiurge" and the female protagonist wears a purple and black outfit.

==== Unfinished 2000 game ====
Another failed attempt would be made by The Collective some time around the year 2000, and was to be published by GT Interactive. It was using a then-current version of the Unreal Engine, and appeared to be a 3D third-person action title similar to The Collective's previous title, Star Trek: Deep Space Nine: The Fallen. At some point during development, the game was cancelled and the project vanished, leaving only a few work-in-progress screenshots as evidence of its existence.

=== Live-action television reboot ===
In June 2018, it was reported that a live-action television reboot is in works at MTV with Jeff Davis and Gale Anne Hurd as executive producers. In September 2021, it was reported that a live-action television reboot is in works at Paramount+, under a new overall deal that Davis has signed with MTV Entertainment Studios. Davis will serve as showrunner and direct the pilot. In early 2023, Davis reported the first two episodes had been written, which he planned to direct.
