= Æon Flux (video game) =

2005 video game

- Developer: Terminal Reality
- Publisher: Majesco
- Director: Drew Haworth
- Producer: Raymond Holmes
- Programmers: Ken Rogoway; Fletcher Dunn
- Writer: Drew Haworth
- Composer: Kyle Richards
- Engine: Infernal Engine
- Platforms: PlayStation 2, Xbox
- Release: NA: November 15, 2005; AU: March 30, 2006; EU: March 31, 2006
- Genre: Action-adventure
- Mode: Single-player

Æon Flux is the video game adaptation of the 2005 film, with elements of the animated series. The game was developed by Terminal Reality and released in November 2005 in North America for PlayStation 2 and Xbox. This marked the first (and so far, only) successful release of a video game based on Æon Flux, after two failed earlier attempts.

== Plot ==
The game is set in the year 2415, after a biological disease has wiped out Earth's population except for those living in Bregna, a walled, protected city-state. The city is ruled by the congress of scientists who discovered the vaccine for the disease. Aeon Flux, a top operative in the underground "Monican" rebellion, is sent on a mission to kill one of Bregna's most influential government leaders, Trevor Goodchild. Following a series of self-discoveries and revelations, Aeon uncovers a world of secrets which makes her doubt her mission and question everything she thought she knew.

The game's storyline attempts to bridge the gap between the TV series and the film by explaining various discrepancies such as the appearance of the jungle outside Bregna and the differences between the movie and TV series versions of Trevor Goodchild. The game's visuals and tone skew toward that of the film, and the look of Aeon in the game is based on Charlize Theron's appearance in the film version; the character is also voiced by her.

== Development ==
In order to coincide with the release of the upcoming film, developer Terminal Reality was only given nine months to finish the game. In order to make the deadline, Terminal Reality relied heavily on the engine they had just used for their previous title, BloodRayne 2.

== Release ==
The game was published across North America on November 15, 2005 by Majesco Entertainment Company. According to the PEGI rating system website by Video Games Europe (The Interactive Software Federation of Europe), the game was released by Majesco Europe Limited of the UK on February 17, 2006.

To help add to the box office gross of the film and to sell more games, specially marked copies sold in the US came with a pass to see the Æon Flux film. The movie was in theaters nationwide by December 2 and these tickets expired on December 31, 2005.

== Reception ==
Reception

Aggregate score
Aggregator	Score	
Aggregator	PS2	Xbox
Metacritic	66/100	69/100

Review scores
Publication	Score	
Publication	PS2	Xbox
1Up.com	C+	N/A
Eurogamer	N/A	4/10
Game Informer	7.25/10	7.25/10
GamePro	3.5/5	3.5/5
GameSpot	7.2/10	7.2/10
IGN	7.8/10	7.8/10
Official U.S. PlayStation Magazine	3/5	N/A
Official Xbox Magazine (US)	N/A	7/10
PALGN	N/A	5/10
TeamXbox	N/A	7.8/10
The New York Times	(average)	(average)

The game received "average" reviews on both platforms according to video game review aggregator website Metacritic.
