= Peter Chung =

American animator and director

- 피터 정
- Born: Jeong Geun-Sik (정건식); Seoul, South Korea
- Occupations: Animator, director
- Known for: Æon Flux; Alexander Senki; Matriculated (The Animatrix)

Peter Chung is a Korean animator and director. He is best known for his unique style of animation, as well as for being the creator and director of Æon Flux, his work on the Matriculated episode of The Animatrix, and for his character design for Reign: The Conqueror (Alexander Senki).

== Early life and career ==
Since his father was in the foreign service of the Republic of Korea, he has lived in Seoul, London, Nairobi, Washington, D.C., New York and Tunis. His parents then immigrated to the United States; he lived in McLean, Virginia. Chung studied animation at California Institute of the Arts (CalArts) from 1979 to 1981, one year at the Character Animation program, and another year in the program in Experimental Animation.

Chung started his animation career at a small animation studio in Maryland at the age of 18, working for animator and illustrator, Salvador Bru. From there, at age 19, he was designing characters for Hanna-Barbera. About this time he also started working on the layout and animation on Ralph Bakshi's Fire and Ice before being hired by Disney for feature development.

=== Directing credits ===
In addition to Æon Flux (3 seasons: 1991, 1992, 1995), Chung's directing credits include the Matriculated segment from The Animatrix, and The Chronicles of Riddick: Dark Fury. Chung served as lead character designer for the animated series, Teenage Mutant Ninja Turtles (1987), C.O.P.S. (1988) Phantom 2040 (1994–1996) and Reign: The Conqueror (1999). The designs feature lean, angular characters inspired by the art of Egon Schiele, a look which has become Chung's trademark character design. He also, along with Arlene Klasky and Gabor Csupo, co-designed the characters in the Nickelodeon series Rugrats, and co-directed its pilot, "Tommy Pickles and The Great White Thing" and the opening sequence. In addition, in 2007, he directed the opening three-part episode for GameTaps' Revisioned: Tomb Raider, entitled "Keys to the Kingdom".

He has also directed some television advertisements, including a Diet Pepsi advertisement featuring Cindy Crawford and Malcolm McDowell.

As of 2009, among other unannounced projects, he was working on a full-length animated feature entitled Luvula. He is also director of the television adaption of Firebreather for Cartoon Network. Chung has also expressed interest in creating a new direct-to-video animated feature of Æon Flux.

=== Animation style and influences ===
Chung names Japanese animation, German expressionism and European comics as his influence, in particular, the illustrative quality of the art that depends on expressive drawings instead of many surface details. He names in his influences expressionist Egon Schiele and comic artist Moebius. As narrative influence he names Kazuo Umezu, Sanpei Shirato, Osamu Tezuka, Jack Kirby, Moebius, Alejandro Jodorowsky, Schuiten and Peeters, Silvio Cadelo, Tatsuya Egawa, Geof Darrow and Frank Miller. He also names as influences, in no special order: David Lynch, Stanley Kubrick, Orson Welles, Alfred Hitchcock, Federico Fellini, Michelangelo Antonioni, Alain Resnais, Jean Cocteau, Alain Robbe-Grillet, Seijun Suzuki, Yoshiaki Kawajiri, Yoshinori Kanada, Horst Janssen, and Frank Lloyd Wright.

Chung's animation, particularly Æon Flux and Matriculated, tends toward the artistically and thematically experimental.

In the animation field, he admires Yoshinori Kanada, Koji Morimoto, and Igor Kovalyov.

Ralph Bakshi, one of the first to hire Chung, has stated that one of Chung's favorite artists is Toulouse-Lautrec.

Chung was one of the artists that worked on the Underground roleplaying game (1993) from Mayfair Games, and author Shannon Appelcline felt that Aeon Flux "was a clear influence" on the game.

In an April 2019 interview with Diego Molano, creator of Victor & Valentino, he said that he was fascinated with Chung's Aeon Flux and how he uses movement to tell a story even without dialogue. He even paused the show and put tracing paper over Chung's drawings, and then sold them at school, showing how Chung's style influenced him. Later, Chung would become the animation director on Victor & Valentino, which Molano was "greatly thankful for."

=== Personal life ===
Chung has also been a participant in online forums, where users have asked him about his work and creative process. Two of the more prominent forums are ILX and Monican Spies.

Chung currently teaches a master class at the Division of Animation and Digital Arts at the USC School of Cinematic Arts since Spring 2013.

== Filmography ==
- Fire and Ice (1983) (film) - Animator, layout artist
- The Transformers (1984) (TV series) - Storyboard artist
- The Transformers: The Movie (1986) (film) - Storyboard artist
- Teenage Mutant Ninja Turtles (1987) (TV series) - Art direction, opening title design
- C.O.P.S. (1988) (TV series) - Character design, opening title direction, overseas animation supervision
- Ring Raiders (1989) (TV series) - Character design
- Rugrats (1991) (TV series) - Animator: main title animation, pilot, character design
- Phantom 2040 (1994) (TV series) - Character design
- Æon Flux (1995) (TV series) - Creator, director, producer, scripts, character design
- The Rugrats Movie (1998) (film) - Storyboards
- Alexander Senki (1999) aka Alexander the Great (international) and Reign: The Conqueror (USA) (TV series) - Character design and original design
- Party 7 (2000) (film) - Animator: credit sequence
- The Animatrix – "Matriculated" (2003) (short) - Director, script, design
- The Chronicles of Riddick: Dark Fury (2004) (OVA) - Director, character designer
- Revisioned: Tomb Raider (2007) (web series) (first episode which is split into 3 parts) - Director, script, design
- Firebreather (2010) (film) - Director
- Diablo III: Wrath (2012) (film) - Director
- Victor & Valentino (2019) (TV series) - Main title
