= Yasunori Honda =

Japanese anime sound director (born 1943)

Yasunori Honda (本田 保則, Honda Yasunori, born May 30, 1943) is a Japanese anime sound director who was born in Toyama Prefecture. He studied in the economics department at the Toyama University. After graduating, he moved to Tokyo with the aim of becoming a theatre director. He joined Zoukei Theater Company, which was supervised by Ushio Shima, and worked as an assistant director. In November 1966, he joined Tatsunoko Production. After becoming independent, he worked as a contractor for Tohokushinsha Film before founding Arts Pro in September 1974. In 2014, at his own discretion, Arts Pro dissolved and he went freelance. He has been an honorary member of the Japan Audio Producers' Association since June 2014. Currently, he works mainly on productions by Madhouse and Toei Animation.

== Notable works ==
=== TV animation ===
- Akagi
- Battle Athletes Victory
- Bubblegum Crisis Tokyo 2040
- Claymore
- Dragon Drive
- Gungrave
- Kaiji
- Macross 7
- Master Keaton
- Ninja Scroll: The Series
- One Outs
- Seven of Seven
- Speed Racer
- Tenchi in Tokyo
- Tenchi Muyo! GXP
- Tenjho Tenge
- Tetsujin 28th
- The Super Dimension Fortress Macross
- Trigun
- Vampire Princess Miyu
- X

=== OVA ===
- Battle Angel
- Battle Athletes
- Biohunter
- Dangaioh
- Dragon Half
- El Hazard series
- Giant Robo
- Gin Rei
- Here is Greenwood
- Macross II
- Magical Girl Pretty Sammy
- Master Keaton
- Megazone 23
- Megazone 23 Part II
- Megazone 23 Part III
- Mezzo DSA
- Outlanders
- Record of Lodoss War
- Street Fighter Alpha: Generations
- Tenchi Muyo! series
- Twilight of the Dark Master
- Vampire Princess Miyu

=== Movies ===
- Project A-ko
- Ninja Scroll
- Tenchi Muyo! series
  - Tenchi Muyo! in Love
  - Tenchi Muyo! Daughter of Darkness
  - Tenchi Forever!
- X
