= Jack Fletcher (voice actor) =

American actor

- Born: United States
- Occupations: Voice actor; voice director; casting director; writer
- Years active: 1986–present
- Relatives: Julia Fletcher (sister), Elliot Fletcher (nephew), John DeMita (brother-in-law)

Jack Fletcher is an American voice actor, casting director, writer and voice director. He has done voice acting and directing for anime and video games. He has been the English voice director for the Sonic the Hedgehog series since 2010's Sonic Free Riders, and also worked in the English dub adaptions of Hayao Miyazaki's films until he was replaced by John Lasseter. Fletcher has also done work as a theater director and teacher. He spent a number of years teaching and directing at the American Conservatory Theater in San Francisco.

== Voice-acting roles ==
- Æon Flux (U.S. TV)
- Asterix and the Vikings – Pirate Captain, Fotograf, Caraf
- Final Fantasy X-2 – Garik
- Final Fantasy: Spirits Within
- Happily N'Ever After – Additional Voices
- Hurricane Polymar: Holy Blood – Onigawara / Skamugu
- The Animatrix: Beyond (OAV)
- The Animatrix: Matriculated (OAV) – Sandro
- Thru the Moebius Strip – Soldier
- Ninja Scroll: The Series – Anden Yamidoro
- Pet Shop of Horrors (TV) – Liu Tai Wei / Police Captain
- Princess Mononoke - Additional Voices
- Psycho Diver: Soul Siren (OAV)
- Tenchi Muyo! Ryo-Ohki – D3 (OVA 2)
- Tenchi Muyo! The Night Before The Carnival – Kamidake
- Twilight of the Dark Master – Eiji Kuraza
- Valkyria Chronicles – Additional Voices
- Vampire Hunter D: Bloodlust – Grove

== Voice direction credits ==
- 24: The Game
- Æon Flux
- Armored Core 4
- Biohunter
- Castle in the Sky
- Celebrity Deathmatch (seasons 5–6)
- Dead or Alive Xtreme 2
- Dead or Alive Paradise
- Dragon Slayer
- Final Fantasy: Legend of the Crystals
- Final Fantasy: The Spirits Within
- Final Fantasy X
- Final Fantasy X-2
- Final Fantasy XII
- Final Fantasy XIII
- Final Fantasy XIII-2
- Final Fantasy Tactics: The War of the Lions
- The First Men on the Moon
- Golgo 13: Queen Bee
- Hurricane Polymar: Holy Blood
- Kiki's Delivery Service
- Legend of the Three Caballeros
- Looney Tunes Cartoons
- MadWorld
- Magical Girl Pretty Sammy
- My Gym Partner's a Monkey
- Ninja Gaiden II
- Ninja Gaiden Sigma 2
- Ninja Scroll: The Series
- Pet Shop of Horrors
- Princess Mononoke
- Project Sylpheed
- Psycho Diver
- Reign: The Conqueror: Episode 1 to 4
- Resonance of Fate
- Rise of Nightmares
- Sonic the Hedgehog series (2010–present)
- Sonic Boom
- Spawn: The Animated Series
- Splatterhouse
- Tekkaman Blade II
- Tenchi Muyo! Mihoshi Special
- Tenchi Muyo! Ryo-Ohki (OAV)
- Tenchi Muyo!' The Night Before the Carnival (OAV)
- Tenchi Universe
- The Animatrix (all segments)
- The Chronicles of Riddick: Dark Fury
- The Powerpuff Girls
- Twilight of the Dark Master
- Valkyria Chronicles
- Valkyria Chronicles II
- Vampire Hunter D: Bloodlust
- Van Helsing: The London Assignment
- Yakuza
