= Hurricane Polymar =

Japanese anime television series

- Cover art from the DVD release of Hurricane Polymar.

破裏拳ポリマー (Hariken Porimā)
- Genre: Superhero
- Created by: Tatsuo Yoshida; Tatsunoko Production Planning Office
- Anime television series
- Directed by: Hisayuki Toriumi
- Written by: Jinzō Toriumi
- Music by: Shunsuke Kikuchi
- Studio: Tatsunoko Production
- Original network: ANN (NET)
- Original run: October 4, 1974 – March 28, 1975
- Episodes: 26
- Original video animation

New Hurricane Polymar
- Directed by: Akiyuki Shinbo
- Produced by: Ippei Kuri; Hirotoshi Ogura; Kazuo Kogura
- Written by: Hideki Kakinuma
- Music by: Tatsumi Yano
- Studio: Tatsunoko; J.C. Staff
- Licensed by: US: Discotek Media (current), Urban Vision (former)
- Released: September 21, 1996 – February 21, 1997
- Runtime: 30 minutes (each)
- Episodes: 2
- icon

Hurricane Polymar (破裏拳ポリマー, Hariken Porimā) is a Japanese anime and OVA series produced by Tatsunoko Productions. The show was created by Tatsuo Yoshida, who had produced many of Tatsunoko's series. Other romanizations of the name include Hurricane Polymer and Hariken Polymar (since the latter is spelled using Japanese kanji). Hurricane Polymar is the secret identity of Takeshi Yoroi (鎧武士, Yoroi Takeshi). He wears a special suit which enables him to fight crime. The suit is made of memory plastic which enables him to assume any shape, including morphing its wearer into five different vehicles.

A OVA remake was released in Japan on September 21, 1996, followed by episode 2 on February 21, 1997. It was later dubbed by New Generation Pictures, and was released in the United States by Urban Vision on VHS on October 1, 1998. It was re-released by Discotek Media on DVD on March 19, 2013.

Anime Sols attempted to crowd-fund the release of the show on North American DVD, but was not successful.

== Overview ==
=== Plot ===
Onigawara, the director of the International Secret Police Agency, looked forward to making Takeshi a top-notch criminal investigator. Takeshi was given training, which turned him into an all-around sportsman as well as martial arts expert. However, Takeshi's attitude toward crime-fighting was so incompatible with Onigawara's, that he disowned him. For a while Takeshi investigated crime alone; then he became private detective Joe Kuruma's assistant and general handyman under the alias Takeshi Yoroi. Secretly, however, Takeshi obtained from a scientist a new artificial polymer, polymet, that was far stronger than steel. With this polymet Takeshi transformed himself into Hurricane Polymar, a costumed hero who fights for justice and to defeat various gangs.

=== Characters ===
- Kazuyuki Sogabe as Takeshi Yoroi/Onigawara (Polymar)
- Takeshi Aono as Joe Kuruma
- Miki Ochiai as Teru Nanba
- Masashi Amenomori as Toragoro Onigawara
- Kan Tokumaru as Inspector Deret
- Kazuya Tatekabe as Baron (Danshaku)
- Kei Tomiyama as Next Episode Preview Narrator

=== Abilities ===
Hurricane Polymar's main ability, aside from augmented strength and high-speed rotation, is transforming into one of five different vehicles. Polymar's suit can also last up to forty-six minutes and one second before having to transform back; if Takeshi does not reverse the transformation, he is in danger of dying from hyperthermia. Since the suit is powered by magnetism, it is vulnerable to high voltage and will also lose power in temperatures lower than −50 degrees Celsius. When inactive, the suit is disguised as Takeshi's motorcycle helmet.

Polymar's vehicles are:

- Polymar Hawk (supersonic jet)
- Polymar Grampus (submarine)
- Polymar Drill (tank with twin drills)
- Polymar Machine (formula-one race car)
- Polymar Roller (steam roller)

== Media ==
=== Anime ===
==== Episode list ====
| # | Episode name | Original air date |
|---|---|---|
| 1 | "Phantom Thieves: The Flying Squirrels"; Transliteration: "Kaitō musasabi tō" (Japanese: 怪盗むささび党) | October 4, 1974 |
| 2 | "Deadly Assassin: The Red Scorpion"; Transliteration: "Ansatsuki benisasori" (Japanese: 暗殺鬼紅サソリ) | October 11, 1974 |
| 3 | "Machine Gang: The Centipede Plan"; Transliteration: "Mekagyangu mukade sakusen" (Japanese: メカギャングむかで作戦) | October 18, 1974 |
| 4 | "The Skull King: Rattlesnake"; Transliteration: "Toguro maō garagara hebi" (Japanese: とぐろ魔王ガラガラ蛇) | October 25, 1974 |
| 5 | "Web-Spinning Devils: The Demon Spiders"; Transliteration: "Itoguru majin tsuchigumo" (Japanese: 糸ぐる魔人土ぐも) | November 1, 1974 |
| 6 | "Machine Transformation: The Mole Thieves"; Transliteration: "Meka henka mogura tōzokudan" (Japanese: メカ変化もぐら盗賊団) | November 8, 1974 |
| 7 | "The Bite-Bark Killers"; Transliteration: "Wanwan kamukira" (Japanese: わんわんカムキラー) | November 15, 1974 |
| 8 | "Acid Machine: The Pitcher Plant"; Transliteration: "Yōkai mashin utsubōra" (Japanese: 溶解マシンウツボーラ) | November 22, 1974 |
| 9 | "The Cat Demon Gang: Dancing in Darkness"; Transliteration: "Nekomadan yami ni odoru" (Japanese: 猫魔団闇に踊る) | November 29, 1974 |
| 10 | "Electric Gang: The Jellyfish"; Transliteration: "Denmadan kuragera" (Japanese: 電魔団クラゲラー) | December 6, 1974 |
| 11 | "Robo-Beast Gang: White Wolf"; Transliteration: "Meka kemono dan Howaitōurufu" (Japanese: メカ獣団ホワイトウルフ) | December 13, 1974 |
| 12 | "Winged Humans: The Robo-Birdmen"; Transliteration: "Chōjin torimekaman" (Japanese: 鳥人トリメカマン) | December 20, 1974 |
| 13 | "The Phantom Image: Misty Butterfly"; Transliteration: "Gen'ei oboro chō" (Japanese: 幻影おぼろ蝶) | December 27, 1974 |
| 14 | "The Great Squeak Plan"; Transliteration: "Chūchū daisakusen" (Japanese: ちゅうちゅう大作戦) | January 3, 1975 |
| 15 | "Lightning Phantom: Sparker Dale"; Transliteration: "Inazuma kaijin pikaderu" (Japanese: 稲妻怪人ピカデール) | January 10, 1975 |
| 16 | "Monster Fish Pirate: Piracanth"; Transliteration: "jugyo kaizoku pirakansu" (Japanese: 獣魚海賊ピーラカンス) | January 17, 1975 |
| 17 | "The Secret of Polymar's Birth"; Transliteration: "Porima tanjō no himitsu" (Japanese: ポリマー誕生の秘密) | January 24, 1975 |
| 18 | "Peril at -50°C"; Transliteration: "Mainasu 50do no kiki" (Japanese: マイナス50度の危機) | January 31, 1975 |
| 19 | "Yama Devil: Stikatung"; Transliteration: "Enma kaijin berodasse" (Japanese: えん魔怪人ベロダッセ) | February 7, 1975 |
| 20 | "Phantom Thieves: The Archer Fishmen"; Transliteration: "Kaitō teppōuojin" (Japanese: 怪盗てっぽう魚人) | February 14, 1975 |
| 21 | "Bark Bark: A Disguise Battle"; Transliteration: "Konkon shichihenge" (Japanese: コンコン七変化) | February 21, 1975 |
| 22 | "Demons of Vengeance: The Helmed Crickets"; Transliteration: "Fukushūki kerakabuto" (Japanese: 復讐鬼ケラカブト) | February 28, 1975 |
| 23 | "Undersea Devils: The Water Kites"; Transliteration: "Kaitei majin uotonbi" (Japanese: 海底魔人ウオトンビ) | March 7, 1975 |
| 24 | "The Magnificent Octomask"; Transliteration: "Kaiketsu tako kamen" (Japanese: 怪傑タコ仮面) | March 14, 1975 |
| 25 | "Sea Turtle General: Tortishell"; Transliteration: "Umigame shōgun bekkōda" (Japanese: 海亀将軍ベッコーダー) | March 21, 1975 |
| 26 | "Polymar's Final Battle"; Transliteration: "Porima saigo no kessen" (Japanese: ポリマー最後の決戦) | March 28, 1975 |

=== Other media ===
In the second episode of the Time Bokan: Royal Revival OVA, Polymar appears alongside other the Tatsunoko heroes. A two-part anime OVA was created in the mid-1990s entitled Hurricane Polymar: Holy Blood featuring extremists that mutate into amphibious shark-like creatures. The OVA was intended to have three episodes, but was cancelled after the second, thus ending without a proper conclusion. Urban Vision initially released it on VHS in the late 1990s, but since then the U.S. DVD rights have gone to Discotek Media. Hurricane Polymar was featured in the PlayStation game Tatsunoko Fight with him and Teru (in a costume she wore in episode 15) as playable characters along with an original character named Astral Chameleon who is composed of the souls of the criminals that died in the series. Hurricane Polymar later appeared as a playable character in the Wii video game Tatsunoko vs. Capcom.

=== Japanese cast (OVA) ===
- Ai Orikasa as Nina Nielsen
- Michiko Neya as Ryoko Nishida
- Ryotaro Okiayu as Takeshi
- Takehito Koyasu as Pulsar
- Takeshi Aono as Joe Kuruma
- Tesshō Genda as Novar
- Yasunori Matsumoto as Skamug
- Yuko Miyamura as Teru Namba

=== English OVA cast ===
- Alex Fernandez as Hurricane Polymar/Takeshi Yoroi
- Barbara Goodson as Nina Neilsen
- David Rasner as Baron
- Matt K. Miller Additional Voices
- John DeMita as Joe Kuruma
- Jack Fletcher as Skamug / Onigawara
- Julia DeMita as Ryoko Nishida
- K.T. Vogt as Teru Namba
- Michael Scott Ryan as Pulsar

==== Episode list (OVA) ====
Both episodes written by Hideki Kakinuma.

| No. | Title | Directed by (Note: Information is taken from the ending credits of each episode.) | Storyboarded by | Animation director | Original release date |
|---|---|---|---|---|---|
| 1 | "Holy Blood Vol.1" | Akiyuki Shinbo (Note: Uncredited.) | Akiyuki Shinbo | Tetsuo Sakurai (Note: A pseudonym.) | September 21, 1996 |
| 2 | "Holy Blood Vol.2" | Akiyuki Shinbo | Akiyuki Shinbo | Yasuomi Umetsu (Note: Character.); Masashi Ishihama (Note: Mecha.) | February 21, 1997 |

=== Live-action film ===
A live-action film adaptation of anime was released on May 13, 2017. Koichi Sakamoto directed the film, while Shinsuke Onishi wrote the script. Junpei Mizobata, Yuki Yamada, Yurina Yanagi, Mikie Hara, Hatsunori Hasegawa and Satoshi Jinbo starred in the film. The theme song for this film is "Kanashimi Naki Sekai e" by Good Morning America.

=== Crossover series ===
Infini-T Force is an anime series featuring a crossover between characters from Science Ninja Team Gatchaman, Casshan, Hurricane Polymar and Tekkaman: The Space Knight. The series is a co-production between Tatsunoko and Digital Frontier and aired from October 3 to December 26, 2017.

== Sources ==
- Shinbo, Akiyuki (2012). 新房語 [Shinbogatari] (in Japanese). Ichijinsha. ISBN 978-4758012591.
