= Ninja Scroll: The Series =

Anime television series based on Yoshiaki Kawajiri's 1993 anime film Ninja Scroll

獣兵衛忍風帖｢龍宝玉篇｣
- Genre: Chanbara
- Created by: Yoshiaki Kawajiri
- Anime television series
- Directed by: Tatsuo Satō
- Produced by: Atsushi Mizuno; Masaki Kobayashi; Kenichirō Zaizen; Miho Suzuki; Toshiya Harada; Hiromichi Masuda
- Written by: Toshiki Inoue
- Music by: Kitarō; Peter "Peas" McEvilley
- Studio: Madhouse
- Licensed by: AUS: Madman Entertainment; NA: Discotek Media; UK: MVM Films
- Original network: WOWOW
- Original run: 14 April 2003 – 15 July 2003
- Episodes: 13

Ninja Scroll: The Series (獣兵衛忍風帖｢龍宝玉篇｣, Jūbē Ninpūchō Ryūhōgyoku Hen; lit. 'Jubei's Wind Ninja Chronicles: Dragon Stone Story') is a 2003 Japanese anime television series that serves as a sequel to Yoshiaki Kawajiri's Ninja Scroll. The series is directed by Tatsuo Sato and animated by Madhouse.

== Plot ==
The story takes place in feudal Japan and follows the adventures of Jubei Kibagami, a mercenary ninja tasked with guarding the fabled relic known as the "Dragon Stone" and protecting its bearer, Shigure the "Light Maiden", from both the Hiruko and Kimon Clans' forces; alongside him on this quest are the government spy, Dakuan, and the mountain thief, Tsubute.

== Characters ==
=== Main characters ===
Jubei Kibagami
Voiced by: Rikiya Koyama (Japanese); Dave Rasner (English)
Jubei Kibagami (牙神 獣兵衛, Kibagami Jūbē) is the protagonist of the show. He is a wandering vagabond ninja who wants nothing but to find a place to rest until one day he finds himself involved in a conflict between the Hiruko and Kimon ninja clans. Later, one of the Hiruko Clan members asks him guard the Dragon Stone and Shigure, beginning Jubei's adventure to protect her from both the Hiruko and the Kimon. A master swordsman, Jubei can wield his blade so quickly he can launch a "vacuum blade," allowing him to cut down foes at a distance. He also carries a hidden throwing dagger and a length of wire connected to his sword for emergencies.
Shigure
Voiced by: Houko Kuwashima (Japanese); Daisy Tormé (English)
All her life, Shigure (しぐれ, Shigure) lived in the mountains until her village was burnt to the ground by the Kimon Clan. Lost and confused, she didn't know what to do until she met Dakuan and Tsubute and realizee that she must go to the village of Yagyu. Shigure is known as the Light Maiden and is highly treasured by her people, as well as the ninja chasing her. She is later revealed to be the lost treasure of an Ancient Kingdom itself, possessing supernatural powers, but when given the chance Shigure chooses to reject them so as to lead a normal life.
Tsubute
Voiced by: Romi Park (Japanese); Scott Menville (English)
Tsubute (つぶて, Tsubute) is a very sneaky mountain thief who ends up tagging along with Dakuan and Shigure and is always trying to steal the Dragon Stone whenever he can. However, despite his greedy and cowardly nature, Tsubute is ultimately a good person at heart. At the end of the series, he's living in Shigure's old valley alongside her and the surviving Hiruko Clan.
Dakuan
Voiced by: Yuzuru Fujimoto (Japanese); Dwight Schultz (English)
An elderly ninja working for the government, Dakuan (濁庵, Dakuan) appears to help Shigure and Tsubute when they are being pursued by a gang of thugs in the woods and later on decides to help them by enlisting the help of Jubei. Although stronger and smarter than Tsubute, Dakuan is equally squirrelly and is revealed to be after the treasure of the Ancient Kingdom himself. While old and not very physically imposing, he makes use of clever (if not frustrating) tactics as well as his extendable staff and various explosive to win fights.

=== The Hiruko Clan ===
Mufu
Voiced by: Hideyuki Tanaka (Japanese); Dwight Schultz (English)
Mufu is the leader of the Hiruko Clan fighting against the Kimon Clan. When the Dragon Stone was stolen, he sends his fellow clansmen to find and take it back from Jubei. He perishes alongside his twin brother, Yamidoro, after Shigure renounces her power as the Light Maiden. His powers are mysterious, but he's been shown using abilities such as necromancy, aerokinesis, and flight as well as being shown to be proficient in the use of a seven-branch sword.
Rouga
Voiced by: Joji Nakata (Japanese); John DeMita (English)
Rouga is a stern shinobi that wears an iron mask. He is the one responsible for stealing the Dragon Stone from the Hiruko to give to the light maiden. He fails in his quest, but is able to give the stone to Jubei for safekeeping. He has werewolf-like abilities, his full transformation occurring when he removes his mask. He is killed during the Kimon clan's assault on Shigure's village by Ubume's rodents.
Mozuku
Voiced by: Isamu Tanonaka (Japanese); Jack Fletcher (English)
Mozuku is a goblin-like shinobi with green skin and a specialized gland on his forehead that spews a thick, web-like substance. He was sent after Roga to retrieve the Dragon Stone, but is attacked by the Kimon ninja in the process and eventually killed by Ubume's rodents.
Nekome
Voiced by: Rica Matsumoto (Japanese); Julia Fletcher (English)
Nekome is a maliciously playful yet reasonable kunoichi with feline-like feet and claws. She attacks Jubei in an attempt to recapture the Dragon Stone, unaware that Roga entrusted it to him. She is killed in battle by Jubei in which he slices her in two.
Nubatama
Voiced by: Mami Koyama (Japanese); Gwendoline Yeo (English)
Nubatama is a coquettish kunoichi with long, dark hair she can manipulate freely to attack her enemies. She tries to seduce Jyashi, who spurns her advances, before attacking him and being run through from behind by Rengoku. Somehow though, despite being stabbed through the heart, she manages to survive and returns to get revenge on Rengoku but is defeated by the other kunoichi and slain, turning into a mummified corpse.
Azami (あざみ)
Voiced by: Aya Hisakawa (Japanese); Julia Fletcher (English)
Azami is a surreptitious kunoichi who can extend her limbs into root-like appendages which she can use as weapons or merge with the surrounding flora to manipulate their root systems. She works covertly from a safe distance, using the roots to attack her opponents. She manages to steal the Dragon Stone from Jubei but ends up splitting it in two in the process. She retains one half but loses it later to Kitsunebi. She is eventually attacked and mortally wounded by Kawahori and dies, but not before giving Jubei half of the Dragon Stone, her body then fuses with a tree that serves as her tomb.
Dakatsu
Voiced by: Toshihiko Nakajima (Japanese); Matt McKenzie (English)
Dakatsu is a grotesque shinobi with an oddly-shaped body and a tail with a poisonous stinger capable of killing a bear within seconds. He tries to manipulate Rengoku by assisting her in killing Jubei in exchange for the stone and her own limbs, which he believes will make him less ugly, but he is tricked and murdered in the end by Rengoku when she controls her body parts on him and forces him to drown himself in the river.
Hakurou
Voiced by: Issei Futamata (Japanese); Jack Fletcher (English)
Hakurou is a venomous shinobi with a body covered in reptile scales and has a lizard-like face. His skin is thick enough to withstand a direct attack from Jubei's air blade. He carries a pair of swords on his back, but primarily fights by firing the scales from his back to shred his opponents from a distance. Jubei eventually kills him by ramming his sword down his throat.
Nenmu
Voiced by: Yuuichi Nagashima (Japanese); Jack Fletcher (English)
Nenmu is a bodiless shinobi that exists as only a single eye and a purple, ooze-like substance. He gains possession of a host by forcefully invading his victim's body and taking control, living on even after they die. He takes possession of a number of travelers taking refuge from the rain along with Jubei. One of the travelers (a mother traveling with her son) is possessed but manages to gain some control over herself and walks into a nearby fire, causing Nenmu to exit her body in a panic and leaving himself vulnerable to being cut down by Jubei.
Zoufu
Voiced by: Yuji Ueda (Japanese); Jonathan Nichols, Candi Milo (young) (English)
Zoufu is a self-possessed man with a Western styled broadsword and enough skill with it to use the same vacuum blade attack as Jubei. He has a monstrous parasite that has lived in his abdomen most, if not all, of his life. He has tried numerous times to kill the beast by coaxing it out, often by putting his life in danger, as the creature always comes to his aid during battle in order to preserve itself. His duel with Jubei leads to him finally killing the beast only to realize that its death meant his own as well and that, ironically, he was a far bigger parasite then that of the creature.
Rokai
Voiced by: Kobuhei Hayashiya (Japanese); John DiMaggio (English)
Rokai is an exuberant shinobi with a voracious appetite and an effeminate disposition. He was imprisoned by his own clan, perhaps for being so annoying, but escaped to find Shigure, the light maiden. He possesses the ability to expand his squat frame into a massively obese, grub-like form. He is killed by Yamidoro while trying to protect Jubei.
The Child
Voiced by: Yuko Sasamoto (Japanese); Candi Milo (English)
An unnamed little girl with the ability to turn into an monstrous-looking hag by growing a second face on the back of her head. She is very agile and fights with a long cloth with sharp edges. After trying to steal the stone in a ship, she is defeated and befriended by Jubei, but is accidentally killed by Renya after she tries to stop him from fighting Kibagami.
Mokuji & Ashizo
Voiced by: Andy Philpot (Mokiju), Jack Fletcher (Ashizo) (English)
Mokuji is an infant-sized shinobi that lives stuffed in the mouth of a big, green, dumb shinobi named, Ashizo. Mokuji seems to be the brains whereas Ashizo is the brawn. Ashizo is run through by ninja under the spell of Utsushiei, then decapitated. Mokuji is left defenseless and is stabbed by Utsushiei disguised as Shigure.

=== The Kimon Clan ===
Anden Yamidoro
Voiced by: Seizō Katō (Japanese); Jack Fletcher (English)
Anden Yamidoro is the leader of the Kimon Clan who wants to overthrow the Hiruko Clan and use the Light Maiden's power to overtake the shogun. He is later revealed to be the brother of Mufu, leader of the Hiruko clan. Yamidoro and Mufu are small, identical twins who reside in what appear to be robotic bodies. He has the ability to generate deadly bolts of electricity and energy waves capable of disintegrating everything.
Yamikubo
Voiced by: Ouji Hiroi (Japanese); John DeMita (English)
Yamikubo, or the "Shogun of Darkness", is Yamidoro's master who wishes to overthrow the Tokugawa Shogunate by using the fortune of the Dragon Stone. He is killed by a Yagyu samurai with a stab to the back while trying to reach the treasure but is revealed to actually be a body double.
Magai
Voiced by: Nozomu Sasaki (Japanese); Dave Wittenberg (English)
Magai is a diminutive, makeup-wearing shinobi that wields a giant spear; attached is a pedal-powered umbrella that spins and flies like a helicopter. While trying to steal the Dragon Stone from Rouga, he is cut down by Jubei.
Ubume
Voiced by: Masako Katsuki (Japanese); Gwendoline Yeo (English)
Ubume is a malevolent kunoichi with a body of semi-metamorphosing flesh. Her son, Yadorigi (voiced by Akio Suyama) is melded with her body and can come to the surface to form his own tiny body. Also melded with her body is a small army of sharp-toothed "rodents" that can freely attack her opponent as well as merge into one giant rodent. Her primary weapon is a flaming thorn whip. She attempts to steal the Dragon Stone from Roga, but is scared off by Jubei's intervention. She later returns to attack Shigure's village, only to be slain by Jubei, which also causes the deaths of Yadorigi and her rodents.
Jyashi
Voiced by: Takehito Koyasu (Japanese); John Mariano (English)
Jyashi is a stolid shinobi with a specialized eye socket that houses a device capable of hypnosis, transporting his opponents into an illusory world, as well as enabling to take an eye from a corpse and place it within the empty socket to see what it saw in its final moments. His left arm is mechanical, containing both his sword and a built-in automatic crossbow launcher with a tremendous firing rate. He is the brother of Rengoku. Jubei defeats him by throwing a dart into his artificial eye, disabling his illusions, before cutting him down.
Rengoku
Voiced by: Mari Yokoo (Japanese); Katy Selverstone (English)
Rengoku is a mysterious kunoichi with a unique body and talent for self-surgery. Rengoku can sew replacement or extra body parts onto herself. She has four arms and a variety of stitch patterns across her body. Her arms stretch out to resemble spindly spider legs and she is viewed as a monster by local villagers. She is obsessed with her brother to the point of incest. His death sent her on a path of vengeance against Jubei, instead of focusing on collecting the Dragon Stone. She is killed by Yamidoro as he petrifies her, causing her body to crumble like crushing rocks, while in her madness mistaking him for Jyashi.
Kitsunebi
Voiced by: Norio Wakamoto (Japanese); Matt McKenzie (English)
Kitsunebi is a bloodthirsty shinobi that possesses a semi-transparent, glass-like body, through which a blue flame can be seen in his chest. He's able to control a swarm of moths that can block attacks and sprinkle a sleeping powder on his enemies. With concentration and mysticism he calls forth a giant moth composed of red energy. Like many of the ninja, he has a wicked personality, exhibited in his attempted rape of Azami. He is killed when his body was shattered by Jubei's sword in a sulfur pit that repelled Kitsunebi's moths.
Tobizaru
Voiced by: Mitsuaki Madono (Japanese); John DeMita (English)
Tobizaru is a shinobi with a baboon-like appearance. He commands a horde of lesser monkey ninja. He uses strange angled swords as well as retractable, wrist-mounted, straight swords. He is actually much smaller than he first appears, as he wears an anthropomorphic, mechanical suit which just shows his head. He is killed by an explosion caused by Yamidoro in an attempt to kill Jubei.
Gouten
Voiced by: Ryuzaburo Otomo (Japanese); Jack Fletcher (English)
Gouten appears to be an inhumanly large shinobi with tank-like armor who carries two giant clubs that act as wheels on which he rolls like a car; on his back are four mounted flamethrowers. However, this is all a façade, as Gouten is actually a human-sized ninja that drives the enormous body like a mecha. He also controls a little mechanical girl that acts as a spy, and a mechanical bird that acts as a messenger. He is killed by a trick of Dakuan's that resulted in him falling down a cliff to the bottom of a lake where he drowned, unable to escape in time.
Aizen
Voiced by: Toshihiko Seki (Japanese); Andy Philpot (English)
Aizen is a manipulative shinobi who has a golden rifle in place of his right arm. He tries to convince Tatsunosuke into joining the Kimon clan. He is killed when Jubei flings his sword into Aizen's forehead.
Kawahori
Voiced by: Kazuki Yao (Japanese); John DeMita (English)
Kawahori is a snide shinobi that has gray skin and white hair, complete with pointed ears and fangs. He has a pair of mechanical bat wings, granting him flight, and he controls a colony of bats that he uses to enshroud his opponent. He can also extend his tongue as a proboscis. He is killed by Jubei while attempting to steal the second half of the Dragon Stone from Azami. His name means bat.
Utsushiei
Voiced by: Urara Takano (Japanese); Julia Fletcher (English)
Utsushiei is a conniving kunoichi who uses special acupuncture pins she places into the necks of others that allows her to control their minds as well as the ability to take the form of others by manipulating her own flesh, such as when she manifested as Shigure (after controlling/seducing the Light Maiden) and managed to fool her companions flawlessly. She is killed by Yamidoro in his attempt to send Jubei into a volcano.

=== Other characters ===
Tatsunosuke
Voiced by: Tomokazu Sugita (Japanese); Alex Fernandez (English)
Tatsunosuke, calling himself "Mr. Diamond", is a thief with the ability to change his body into diamonds. He later meets up with Tsubute and they become friends. He is totally useless when he is hungry.
Yayoi
Voiced by: Nana Mizuki (Japanese); Sherry Lynn (English)
Yayoi is Tatsunosuke's sister. While her brother is out, she grows vegetables so that they will not go hungry. She considers her brother useless since he cannot do anything right.
Renya Yagyu
Voiced by: Toshiyuki Morikawa (Japanese); John Rafter Lee (English)
A government ninja from the Yagyu clan who was sent to find Shigure and collect the Dragon Stone. He is cold-blooded and doesn't care if his men die before him. He seeks to kill Shigure due to her possessing the dangerous powers of the Ancients, leading to him and Jubei clashing in an epic battle within the heart of the volcano; it's left unknown whether or not he survived in the end.
Yasubei Yagyu
Voiced by: Kiyoshi Kobayashi (Japanese); John DeMita (English)
An elder of the Yagyu clan, sent before Renya to find Shigure. He decides to kill her in order to stop the Kimon and Hiruko clans, but is stopped and killed by Zoufu and his parasite respectively.
Genza
Voiced by: Tamio Ohki (Japanese); Dave Rasner (English)
Genza was an old man who looked after Shigure while she lives in the hidden village. Despite Shigure trying to prove she isn't a child anymore, he still treats her like one. He and his fellow villagers are killed by the Kimon Clan when they attack.

== Episodes ==
No.	Title	Original release date
1	"Tragedy in the Hidden Village" "Kakuresato Muzan" (かくれ里無惨)	15 April 2003
A ninja named Roga from the Hiruko Clan steals the Dragon Stone from the Hiruko Clan, and a huge clan fight over the stone ensues. Ninja hero Jubei interrupts the fight to take the jewel and, after Roga asks him, accepts the task of delivering it to Shigure - the Priestess of Light. Roga dies sacrificing himself for the Light Maiden, living in the light for once before he dies.
2	"Departure" "Tabidachi" (旅立ち)	22 April 2003
Jubei must find a way to give the Dragon Stone to Shigure whilst being hunted down by both the Hiruko Clan and the Kimon Shu. After her village is destroyed, Shigure wanders helplessly until she meets Tsubute and Dakuan who are willing to help her find out who she really is.
3	"Forbidden Love" "Jaren Dōkoku" (邪恋慟哭)	29 April 2003
Two members of the Kimon Shu, Jyashi and Rengoku, fight Jubei and Dakuan for the Dragon Stone and the Priestess of Light. Jyashi is killed by Jubei, and Rengoku, broken, swears to avenge his death.
4	"Broken Stone" "Wareta Hōgyoku" (割れた宝玉)	6 May 2003
Jubei is ambushed by strange roots sent by a Hiruko Ninja, and during the struggle for the stone it is split in two, and the roots take one half. Later a Kimon Shu ninja steals the Hiruko Ninja's half, and sends it back to the Kimon Shu base. Jubei tries to get the stone back, only to find that it is too late.
5	"Diamond Child" "Kongō Dōji" (金剛童子)	13 May 2003
After stealing the Dragon Stone from Shigure, Tsubute meets Tatsunosuke, a failed yet talented thief who also wants to steal the Dragon Stone. A Kimon Shu member named Aizen wants Tatsunosuke to join him.
6	"Shelter from the Rain" "Amayadori" (雨宿り)	20 May 2003
As the rain pours down, Jubei is attacked and poisoned. Seeking shelter from the rain, he meets up with a boy and his mother who cure him of the poison. But the creature that poisoned Jubei isn't dead and when killed can leave its host to take another.
7	"Blossom" "Tsubomi" (蕾)	27 May 2003
Still after the stone, the root-woman from episode 4 manages to steal Jubei's half of it, but along the way, a Kimon Shu member attacks her. With the help of Jubei, she survives to tell him of the Hiruko, and return the stone.
8	"The Fate of Rengoku" "Rengoku Shōten" (煉獄昇天)	3 June 2003
After her brother's death, Rengoku is willing to do whatever it takes to kill Jubei even if it means losing her mind, and several limbs.
9	"A Dragon Within" "Harawata ni Ryū" (はらわたに龍)	17 June 2003
A man named Zofu saves Shigure from the Yagyu clan. He reveals the secrets of the Hiruko Clan to her. He also wishes to get rid of an old friend that he carries. With Jubei's help, he might get a chance.
10	"The Heart of the Hiruko" "Hiruko no Magokoro" (ヒルコの真心)	24 June 2003
Shigure has an unexpected friend by her side, Rokai - a Hiruko Ninja. He fails to protect her as the Kimon Shu have sent out their elite to finish the job. Shigure is finally captured.
11	"Yagyu Renya" "Yagyū Ren'ya" (柳生連夜)	1 July 2003
Jubei must save Shigure by taking a ship to another part of Japan. Along the way, he meets Yagyu Renya, a cold-blooded samurai who has the same goals as Jubei, to find the Dragon Stone and Shigure. Not only that, there seems to be a killer on the ship and everyone is in danger.
12	"Dynasty Restoration" "Ōchō Fukkoku" (王朝復活)	8 July 2003
Jubei saves Shigure from the Kimon Shu with the help of the Hiruko. But as they get closer to the ancient Hiruko Lands, it becomes evident that all is not what it seems, and the Kimon Shu have the upper hand once again.
13	"Farewell Jubei" "Seiten Hyōhyō" (青天飄飄)	15 July 2003
Now Shigure's destiny is unveiled and she must walk the path of the Priestess of Light. Will she be able to face her destiny without Jubei by her side?

== Soundtrack ==
Ninja Scroll

Soundtrack album by Various artists
- Released: August 26, 2003
- Genre: Soundtrack
- Length: 0:43:50
- Label: Domo Records, Inc
- Producer: Kitarō

Various artists chronology
Sacred Journey of Ku-Kai Vol.1 (2003)	Ninja Scroll (2003)	The Saboten (2004)

Ninja Scroll is an original soundtrack to Japanese TV series of the same name, written and directed by Yoshiaki Kawajiri. Taking place in ancient Japan, Ninja Scroll is the story of a wandering Ninja warrior named Jubei. The music for the soundtrack is co-scored by Kitaro and Peter (Peas) McEvilley.

=== Track listing ===
Title
No.	Title	Composer	Length
1.	"Jubei's Theme"	Kitaro	1:36
2.	"Sure Shot"	Peas	3:14
3.	"All We Are"	Peas	3:56
4.	"Peppercorn - Tsubute's theme"	Peas	4:51
5.	"Ninja Femme Fatale"	Peas	2:48
6.	"Gales Of Wind (Dance Mix)"	Peas	4:23
7.	"Drifting Journey"	Peas	3:41
8.	"Hikari"	Peas	1:09
9.	"Only The Night"	Peas	4:06
10.	"Itinerancy - Dakuan's Theme"	Peas	3:52
11.	"Glory"	Peas	3:39
12.	"Peaceful Village"	Peas	1:49
13.	"Shigure's Theme"	Kitaro	4:44

=== Personnel ===
- Kitaro - Keyboards, Producer, Engineer, Mixing
- Gary Barlough - Engineer
- Peas - Composer
- Rachel Leslie - Vocals
- Gavin Lurssen - Mastering

Additional Personnel

- Eiichi Naito - Album Producer
- Dino Malito - A&R
- Tatsuya Hayashi - A&R
- Howard Sapper - Business & Legal Affairs
- Kio Griffith - Art Direction, Design
