= Matt McKenzie =

American actor

- Other name: Matt MacKenzie
- Occupation: Actor
- Years active: 1987–present
- Children: 2
- Relatives: Terri Gross (sister)

Matt McKenzie is an actor known for his voice work in games and films. He voiced Auron in the Final Fantasy games Final Fantasy X and Final Fantasy X-2, and reprised the role in Kingdom Hearts II. He also provided the English voice of Borgoff in the film Vampire Hunter D: Bloodlust, Ptolemy in Reign: The Conqueror, Major Elliot in Final Fantasy: The Spirits Within, and several agents in The Animatrix. McKenzie also appeared as Colin Clive in Gods and Monsters and had roles in television series, including Star Trek: Voyager, Star Trek: Deep Space Nine, JAG, 7th Heaven, That '70s Show, The O.C., 24, House M.D., and Mad Men.

McKenzie is often typecast as grumpy or serious characters due to his somewhat "gruff" voice. He appeared in theater productions performed in the Pacific Resident Theatre, the Old Globe Theatre, and the Notre Dame Theatre. Shows that he appeared in include Anna Christie, Scotland Road, Barbarians, and An Ideal Wife.

== Filmography ==
=== Films ===
| Year | Title | Role | Notes |
|---|---|---|---|
| 1989 | The Cover Girl and the Cop | FBI Agent | |
| 1989 | She's Out of Control | Airport Security Officer | |
| 1990 | Club Fed | Fred | |
| 1990 | The Rookie | Detective Wang | |
| 1992 | In Sickness and in Health | Darren | Television film |
| 1992 | Dragon Slayer | Galen (voice) | Video; English version |
| 1994 | Menendez: A Killing in Beverly Hills | Princeton Coach | Television film |
| 1997 | Bio Hunter | Komada (voice) | Video; English version |
| 1997 | Twilight of the Dark Master | Junk (voice) | English version |
| 1998 | Gods and Monsters | Colin Clive | |
| 1998 | The Odd Couple II | Pilot | |
| 1999 | Black Mask | Inspector 'Rock' Shek Wai-Ho (voice) | English version |
| 1999 | Princess Mononoke | Additional Voices (voice) | English version |
| 2000 | Architecture of Reassurance | Maggie's Father | Short film |
| 2000 | Wanted | Agent Baker | |
| 2000 | Gen^{13} | Additional Voices (voice) | |
| 2001 | The Ghost | Night Cruiser Cop #1 | |
| 2001 | Final Fantasy: The Spirits Within | Major Elliot (voice) | |
| 2001 | Vampire Hunter D: Bloodlust | Borgoff (voice) | English version |
| 2002 | Role of a Lifetime | Cop | |
| 2003 | The Bottom Line | Dave | Short film |
| 2003 | The Animatrix | Agent #1 (segment "World Record"); Agent (segment "Beyond" and "A Detective Story") (voice) | |
| 2004 | Out for Blood | Jogger | Video |
| 2007 | Tekkonkinkreet | Assassin 3 (voice) | English version |
| 2014 | Heaven's Hard Pitches | David Martin | Short film |
| 2015 | The Big Day | Road Rage (voice) | Short film |
| 2018 | Brother X | Drunk Man | Short film |

=== Television ===
| Year | Title | Role | Notes |
|---|---|---|---|
| 1987 | Moonlighting | Inmate | Episode: "Cool Hand Dave: Part 2" |
| 1988 | L.A. Law | Peter Montal | Episode: "Hey, Lick Me Over" |
| 1989 | Married... with Children | Reporter | Episode: "At the Zoo" |
| 1989 | Dallas | Mark Randazzo | Episode: "Hell's Fury" |
| 1991 | Life Goes On | Cop #1 | Episode: "Last Stand in Glen Brook" |
| 1991 | Equal Justice | Attorney | Episode: "What Color Are My Eyes?" |
| 1992 | Murphy Brown | Secret Service Agent | Episode: "Guess Who's Coming to Luncheon" |
| 1992 | Empty Nest | Man | Episode: "R.N. on the Rebound" |
| 1992 | Knots Landing | Max | Episode: "The Price" |
| 1993 | Beverly Hills, 90210 | Reporter #3 | Episode: "The Child Is The Father to the Man" |
| 1994 | Murder, She Wrote | Corporal Desmond O'Gara | Episode: "Northern Explosion" |
| 1994 | Star Trek: Deep Space Nine | Dr. Weld Ram | Episode: "The Alternate" |
| 1994 | Ellen | Officer | Episode: "Mrs. Koger" |
| 1995 | Platypus Man | Sportscaster | Episode: "NYPD Nude" |
| 1995 | Cybill | Jumpmaster | Episode: "Call Me Irresponsible" |
| 1996 | Silk Stalkings | Gordon Keller | Episode: "Appearances" |
| 1997–1998 | Todd McFarlane's Spawn | Additional voices (voice) | 6 episodes |
| 1998 | Smart Guy | Newscaster | Episode: "Rooferman, Take One" |
| 1998 | Ally McBeal | Officer Barnes | Episode: "The Inmates" |
| 1998 | Family Matters | Mitch | 2 episodes |
| 1998 | That '70s Show | Patrolman #1 | Episode: "The Best Christmas Ever" |
| 1999 | Profiler | Nick | Episode: "Where or When" |
| 1999 | 3rd Rock from the Sun | Mr. Wheeler | Episode: "The House That Dick Build" |
| 1999 | Seven Days | Dr. Chapel | Episode: "Parkergeist" |
| 1999 | Sliders | Tony Jacobs | Episode: "A Current Affair" |
| 1999 | 7th Heaven | Ken | Episode: "Forget Me Not" |
| 1999 | Tekkaman Blade II | Goliate (voice) | English version |
| 1999–2000 | The Jamie Foxx Show | IRS Agent, Executive Head | 2 episodes |
| 2000 | Pet Shop of Horrors | Mr. Hayman, Roger (voice) | 2 episodes English version |
| 2001 | Bette | Business Man | Episode: "Of Men and Meatballs" |
| 2001 | JAG | Felton Swaggard | Episode: "Retreat, Hell" |
| 2001 | Star Trek: Voyager | Port Authority Officer | Episode: "Natural Law" |
| 2002 | Judging Amy | Attorney Jeff Franklin | Episode: "The Bottle Show" |
| 2003 | Reign: The Conqueror | Ptolemy (voice) | 4 episodes English version |
| 2003 | Ninja Scroll: The Series | Kitsunebi, Dakatsu, Old Merchant (voices) | English version |
| 2004 | The Bernie Mac Show | Christopher's Dad | Episode: "Stiff Upper Lip" |
| 2004 | Las Vegas | Detective Bill Clark | Episode: "The Count of Montecito" |
| 2005 | The West Wing | Republican Convention Speaker #2 | Episode: "Things Fall Apart" |
| 2005 | The O.C. | Prom Announcer | Episode: "The O.Sea" |
| 2005 | House M.D. | Dr. Fedler | Episode: "Daddy's Boy" |
| 2006 | The Unit | Security Officer | Episode: "Security" |
| 2006–2007 | Veronica Mars | Tom Barry | 3 episodes |
| 2007 | 24 | Agent Hollister | 4 episodes |
| 2007 | Two and a Half Men | Gary | Episode: "Putting Swim Fins on a Cat" |
| 2008 | Mad Men | 'Crab' Colson | 2 episodes |
| 2011 | Medium | Managerial Type | Episode: "Only Half Lucky" |

=== Video games ===
| Year | Title | Role | Notes |
|---|---|---|---|
| 2001 | Final Fantasy X | Auron | English version |
| 2003 | Final Fantasy X-2 | Auron | English version |
| 2006 | Kingdom Hearts II | Auron | English version |
