= Gen13 (film) =

Gen^{13}
- Comic-Con poster
- Directed by: Kevin Altieri
- Screenplay by: Kevin Altieri; Karen Kolus
- Story by: Jim Lee; Brandon Choi; J. Scott Campbell
- Based on: Gen^{13} by: Jim Lee; Brandon Choi; J. Scott Campbell
- Produced by: Jim Lee; Karen Kolus; John Nee
- Starring: Alicia Witt; John de Lancie; E. G. Daily; Flea; Cloris Leachman; Lauren Lane; Mark Hamill
- Music by: Amotz Plessner; Joseph Magee
- Production companies: WildStorm Productions; Aegis Entertainment
- Distributed by: Buena Vista Pictures Distribution, Inc. (United States); Paramount Pictures (International)
- Release date: July 17, 1998 (Wizard World Chicago)
- Running time: 86 minutes
- Country: United States
- Language: English
- Budget: $2 million

Gen^{13} is a 1998 American adult animated superhero film based on the Gen^{13} comic book series published by WildStorm Productions which is a part of DC Comics. The film, released in 2000, was directed by Kevin Altieri and produced by WildStorm. The film was distributed by Buena Vista Pictures and first screened for the general public at the Wizard World Chicago convention July 17, 1998.

== Plot ==
College student Caitlin Fairchild is offered a scholarship by the National Security Committee to attend a secret military school set in a U.S. desert base. While there, she meets new friends Percival Chang (Grunge) and Roxanne Spaulding (Freefall). Unbeknownst to them, Ivana Baiul and Matthew Callahan, the school's headmasters, are conducting a clandestine project known as "Gen 13", in which they perform genetic experiments on their pupils in a plot to turn them into super-powered beings ("go Gen Active") and launch an insurrection against the government. The only person opposing, Colonel John Lynch of Internal Operations, is an original member of the Gen 12 project who is determined to expose the headmasters' illegal operations. While investigating the Gen 13 project, he introduces himself to Caitlin and mentions that he knew her father, Alex.

While feeling nauseous and searching for the infirmary one night, Caitlin finds a lab and searches through its databases for information on her father, finding out the things he had to put up with as a member of Gen 12. She is joined by Grunge and Roxy, but the three are discovered by a guard. Caitlin displays superhuman abilities and ends up defeating multiple guards so the trio can get away. Grunge and Roxy are soon captured, but Caitlin manages to escape, steal an exo-suit, and return to the base to help rescue her friends. Ivana is convinced that Grunge and Roxy are Lynch's spies and refuses to believe their denials. Soon, she is alerted that Lynch is arriving with a squadron to investigate their illegal activities. Once she leaves, Matthew reveals to Grunge and Roxy that he is a psychic and knows that they are telling the truth. Taking on the name Threshold, he intends to torture them until they go Gen Active or die. Grunge does go Gen Active and gains the power of substance mimicry. He breaks free, knocks out Threshold, and frees Roxy. They kiss afterwards.

After a skirmish with Ivana, the trio intimidates a pilot into flying them home by helicopter as the fighting between Ivana and Lynch's forces rages. Threshold prevents their escape and destroys the helicopter. Roxy unknowingly engages her gravity-controlling powers and slows their fall. Threshold descends to reveal he intends to overthrow what he believes is a corrupt government that had killed his parents. The trio views him as fanatical and fight him, defeating him just before Lynch arrives to defuse the situation, and reveals that Caitlin and Threshold are half-siblings. Lynch explains that after learning the NSC was after the two of them, their mother did everything she could to protect them, but when Caitlin's father could not help her, she went to her ex-husband Callahan, another member of Gen 12 and Matthew's father. Callahan tried to get them out of the country. However, despite all of his efforts, the NSC killed both of them and captured Matthew. Lynch couldn't get there in time to save Matthew and his parents, but he found the infant Caitlin, and he returned her to her uncle once the government's SPB program was discontinued. Caitlin realizes her recurring nightmares are repressed memories of that event.

Meanwhile, Ivana sets the base and school to self-destruct as she flees. A landslide is caused by the base's destruction and it heads for the gang. With so little time for them to get away, Threshold sacrifices himself to help his sister escape. Lynch explains to the trio that trying to quit Internal Operations would never end well, but offers to help train them to use their powers to make the world a better place, and Caitlin and her friends accept.

== Voice Cast ==
- Alicia Witt as Caitlin Fairchild
- John de Lancie as Colonel John "Jack" Lynch
- Flea as Edward Chang / Grunge
- Elizabeth Daily as Roxy Spaulding / Freefall
- Mark Hamill as Matthew Callahan / Threshold
- Lauren Lane as Ivana Baiul
- Cloris Leachman as Helga Kleinman
- John DeMita as Stephen Callahan
- Kath Soucie as Rachel

Additional voices by Corey Burton, Julia DeMita, Debi Derryberry, Dave Fennoy, Alex Fernandez, Jamie Hanes, John Hostetter, Mary Kivala, Dakin Matthews, Matt McKenzie, Matt K. Miller, Andy Philpot, Pamela Segall, Mike Sorich and Ahmet Zappa.

== Production ==
Following the cancellation Wild C.A.T.s by CBS, WildStorm Productions announced they were working on an animated adaptation of Gen^{13} which would be written by Kevin Altieri. Jim Lee stated disappointment with Wild C.A.T.s led to him and Wildstorm deciding to maintain more creative control to avoid a repeat of the experience. Altieri stated that his time working on Batman: The Animated Series where he got to elevate animation to a point where it could be appreciated by an adult audience encouraged him to find a project that would allow him to continue on that trajectory. Initially, Altieri was pursuing an animated adaptation of Hellboy and had meetings with Mike Mignola and Dark Horse Comics that ultimately didn't lead to anything. Upon meeting with Jim Lee where he learned of Wildstorm's planned animated adaptation of Gen^{13}, Lee offered the film to Altieri stating Wildstorm could guarantee the budget for a direct-to-video release which would be distributed through the direct market at comic book stores. Gen^{13} missed its initial planned Fall 1996 release date due to Altieri having his staff poached by larger companies, such as DreamWorks Animation and Warner Bros. Animation, who were able to offer multi-year contracts that the independent nature and low budget of the project couldn't support. Glen Murakami provided the character designs prior to leaving for work on Superman: The Animated Series. Altieri stated his plan for the film was for a PG-13, but depending on agreements with any potential distributors there would also be the possibility of edited G-rated versions. Altieri said the primary focus of Gen^{13} would be on Caitlin Fairchild, Roxy, and Grunge. While the movie is based on the first five issues of the Gen^{13} comic, the characters of Burnout and Rainmaker were excised from the final film. Other changes Altieri made included the expansion of Helga played by Cloris Leachman who originally only appeared in one panel of the comic but was expanded to make her a stern drill instructor with a maternal core. Additional changes made by Altieri were primarily aesthetic in particular the design of Caitlin's appearance after acquiring superpowers with the comic book appearance described as going further than Lara Croft.

In February 1997, it was reported that The Walt Disney Company was seeking to make a live-action feature film of Gen^{13} produced by Courtney Solomon and John Benitez for some time in release in 1998 or 1999 which Lee would executive produce. As part of the deal, Disney agreed to give the Gen^{13} animated film a direct-to-video released through their Buena Vista Home Video label. In October of that year, it was announced the Gen^{13} would be delayed again for release sometime in 1998 and was at present 60% complete In January 1998, a first cut of Gen^{13} was announced to have been completed with the possibility of release in early 1998. In February 1998, Altieri stated Disney was satisfied with the film and that the plans for an edited cut would be cancelled.

== Release ==
Gen^{13} received its premiere at Wizard World Chicago convention on July 17, 1998.

In September 1998, Lee reported entered into an agreement in principle to sell WildStorm to DC Comics, a division of Time Warner Entertainment (now Warner Bros. Discovery). By this point Disney reportedly still intended to release the film in Summer 1999. While an official explanation as to why the film went unreleased in the United States has never been given, it has been speculated that either Disney grew cold feet due to the film's depictions of violence and sexuality or that they no longer wanted to distribute a film tied to the assets of a competing company. While the film was never released in the U.S., it did receive a limited video release in Europe and Australia by Paramount Pictures in the year 2000.

== TV series ==
Kevin Altieri stated that the film could potentially lead to a Gen^{13} TV series depending on the success of the film which Disney was reportedly interested in backing.
