= Reign: The Conqueror =

Television series

- Tokyopop North American DVD cover

アレクサンダー戦記 (Arekusandā Senki)
- Genre: Action, Adventure, Science fantasy, Supernatural, Historical fiction
- Light novel
- Written by: Hiroshi Aramata
- Published by: Kadokawa Haruki Office
- Original run: 1996 – 1997
- Volumes: 3
- Anime television series
- Directed by: Yoshinori Kanemori
- Produced by: Hae-Jong Park; Yosuke Ozawa; Yoshiteru Takeda; Yoshihisa Nakayama
- Written by: Sadayuki Murai
- Music by: Ken Ishii
- Studio: Madhouse; DR Movie
- Original network: Wowow
- English network: US: Adult Swim, Showtime Beyond
- Original run: September 15, 1999 – December 8, 1999
- Episodes: 13
- Anime film
- Directed by: Yoshinori Kanemori; Rintaro
- Produced by: Hae-Jong Park; Haruki Kadokawa; Yoshiteru Takeda; Yoshihisa Nakayama
- Written by: Sadayuki Murai
- Music by: Ken Ishii
- Studio: Madhouse; DR Movie
- Released: October 7, 2000
- Runtime: 75 minutes

Alexander Senki (Japanese: アレクサンダー戦記, Hepburn: Arekusandā Senki; lit. 'Alexander War Chronicle'), released in North America as Reign: The Conqueror, in Europe and Australia as Alexander the Great, and in South America simply as Alexander, is a Japanese and South Korean animated television series that aired from September to December 1999. The series is a reimagining of the life of Alexander the Great based on the novel series Emperor's Fantasy – Alexander's War Chronicles by Hiroshi Aramata. It was produced by an international staff that drew various resources from the worldwide animation community. Character designs for the anime were conceived by Peter Chung (better known for creating Æon Flux), while it was directed by Yoshinori Kanemori and written by Sadayuki Murai. For the original Japanese release, the opening theme song is "Let's Count Your Kisses ~You Were Mine~" (あなたのキスを数えましょう 〜You were mine〜, Anata no Kisu o Kazoe Mashō ~Yū wā main~) performed by Yuki Koyanagi, with composition and arrangement by Hideya Nakazaki and lyrics written by Koi Takayanagi. For the American release, the opening theme song is "Worthy of Your Soul" performed by Rachael Pollack.

In the original attempt at American distribution, an English dub for the first four episodes was produced under the direction of veteran voice director Jack Fletcher. However, when the anime was later acquired by Tokyopop in preparation for a broadcast on Adult Swim under the title Reign: The Conqueror in February 2003, a new dub was created. Tokyopop retained the rights to the first four episodes of the series containing Fletcher's dub, and used them for its American release instead of redubbing them. The company then used its own dub for the remaining episodes that were not dubbed under Fletcher. Only John DeMita would return to reprise his role in the series under the alias Will Barrett, and would also take over the role of Alexander from Andrew Philpot. At some point several years after licensing it around 2002, Tokyopop let its rights to the series expire and it has remained without a licensor in North America since.

There is also a compilation film edition of Reign: The Conqueror, known as Alexander: The Movie in North America, which consists almost entirely of recut footage from the series, with the only new content being short opening and closing scenes. The movie covers the first ten episodes of the anime, ending with Alexander's victory over Darius and the Persian army.

== Plot ==
Alexander is born a son of Philip II, king of Macedonia and Olympias, a snake witch and priestess. Desiring to attain 'speed', Alexander heads to the woods with allies Philotas and Hephaestion, where he tames a wild man-eating horse, which he names Bucephalus. At the same time he meets and befriends Cleitus and Ptolemy I Soter, recruiting them to join his cavalry. Macedonia heads to war with Athens, led by King Philip and his top advisers, Attalus, Parmenion (father of Philotas) and Antipater. Philip becomes concerned with Alexander's absence, but Alexander and his cavalry arrive at the last moment, exploiting a break in the Athenian lines and leading Macedonia to a victory. After their defeat, Athens ambassadors head to Persia, where they hope to make an alliance with new king Darius III of Persia. Alexander and his friends sneak in as Athens slaves and then kill the guards, causing Darius and his followers to think that Athens is betraying them. Darius quickly executes the Athenian ambassadors, while Alexander wanders into the Hanging Gardens of Babylon and meets a woman named Roxanne. Ptolemy is caught by the Persian army and is suspended in the air, but Alexander saves him from an execution at the last minute by releasing all the horses in the city from their stables, and creating a chaos big enough to escape with his group.

Attalus tricks Philip into thinking that Olympias and Alexander are trying to betray him. Philip banishes Olympias and marries Attalus's daughter Eurydice, who gives birth to a son that Philip plans to make his heir and future king instead of Alexander. Philip holds a great ceremony to present the new prince to the masses and also constructs a huge golden statue of himself, declaring himself a God. During the ceremony the statue crumbles, and a guard hypnotized by Olympias assassinates Philip. It is also implied that shortly after, while successfully driving Eurydice into madness, Olympias herself kills both Eurydice and her baby.

Following Philip's death Alexander ascends to King and Attalus is executed. Athens, led by Demosthenes, plots to fight back against Macedonia, doubting Alexander's strength, but relents once Macedonia defeats the powerful city of Thebes in battle. Alexander places severe demands on Athens but relents on most of them after meeting with the philosopher Diogenes of Sinope and becoming impressed by his wisdom, as well as his simple life and philosophy. Alexander next plots an attack on Persia and starts leading his troops there. Around this time Parmenion reveals to Philotas a secret about Alexander: that prior to his birth Olympias proclaimed that he would destroy the world. In addition, Aristotle, a renowned philosopher and former teacher of Alexander, sends his niece, Cassandra, to join Alexander's cavalry. Macedonia's forces continue to head through Persia's territories with multiple victories. Along the way Alexander recruits the doctor Phillipas to join him after cutting the famous Gordian's Knot (which was said that could only be undone by the King of the World) with his sword. In their next battle with Persia, Macedonia's troops are hopelessly outnumbered by Persia's, which are 10 times that of Macedonia's, but Darius tells his forces to retreat when members of the mysterious Pythagorean Cult intervene. During the battle Philotas falls off his horse and has a vision of Olympias summoning demons.

While in Egypt, Alexander meets Dinocrates, a member of his army who tells him of the great city he wishes to create there: Alexandria. Alexander has a vision of himself being in Alexandria 100 years after his death, where he visits the place where he was entombed by Ptolemy. Before leaving Egypt Alexander and his men visit the Temple of Ammon, where they witness an oracle's prophecy about Alexander being killed by the one person he trusts the most. Ptolemy witnesses a separate prophecy that tells him he will become a "Great King of the World". Plotting with Persia, Pythagorean cult members make another attempt on Alexander's life but he is able to fight them off. Darius leads Persia's armies against Macedonia's. Aristotle meanwhile meets with Diogenes, requesting the Plato-Hedron, a device created by Aristotle's teacher Plato, which contains the knowledge of the entire world. Diogenes claims however that he tossed it aside. The two watch as the battle continues. The Macedonian army gains new strength when there is an eclipse of the moon, and the Plato-Hedron appears and ascends to the heavens. As the battle nears its conclusion, Alexander kills Darius, defeating the Persians once and for all.

With Persia now part of his empire, Alexander recruits Satibarzanes, Darius's former adviser and Satrap, to become a top adviser of his. The Macedonian army becomes concerned that Alexander wants to continue heading east rather than return to Macedonia. Philotas dismisses their complaints but doesn't tell Alexander. Aristotle is also concerned with Alexander's actions and tells Cassandra that she will have to kill him should he continue to push eastward. Phillipas, secretly a member of the Pythagorean cult, plots with them to kill Alexander during his wedding to Roxanne through the use of a dancer possessing poison. During the battle she poisons Alexander but is killed before finishing him off. Satibarzanes frames Parmenion and Philotas for treason. Parmenion is killed by the plotters and Philotas is tied up and stoned to death. When Alexander arrives during the stoning, Philotas requests he let him die so as to not show weakness to the Persians. Phillipas, who treats Alexander, has the opportunity to poison Alexander but instead reveals the truth to him and provides Alexander the means to heal himself, then kills himself with the poison intended for Alexander.

After executing Satibarzanes and the other Persian traitors, Alexander leads his forces towards India. Aristotle provides Cassandra with a parchment that she is instructed to read when they reach India. They reach India where they see a large number of horse-like men known as the Brahman priests. Cleitus, becoming increasingly suspicious of Alexander, questions his motives. At this moment, the Brahman suddenly attack, interrupting them. As Alexander and Cleitus fend them off, Cassandra reads the parchment, putting her under a spell from Aristotle to kill Alexander. When she lunges towards him, Cleitus steps in the way and takes the fatal wound himself.

Alexander and the others continue through India, where they encounter a massive army made up of all the soldiers they have killed over the years. During the battle, Hephaestion is killed when Alexander fights the ghost of Darius. Alexander then rides on into a column of light and faces off against King Porus, who takes on Alexander's appearance. Stating that the world tells him to destroy himself, Alexander defeats his doppelganger in combat. He then encounters Pythagoras at the end of the world, but Pythagoras has no interest in stopping Alexander from destroying the world. He echoes Diogenes' words to Alexander that by destroying the world, Alexander will be creating it anew. Alexander seemingly embraces his destiny as destroyer of the world, but the world does not end: instead, the dark skies clear and Alexander emerges from a pillar of light facing west. He decrees that destiny now points him that way, and embarks for Macedonia.

After Alexander and his army return to Macedonia, Aristotle receives a letter from Cassandra informing him that she has chosen to stay with Alexander of her own will; it is then revealed that Aristotle does not recognize his niece's name and is now amnesiac. Later, a handmaiden attempts to find Alexander to tell him that Roxanne is pregnant. Elsewhere, Alexander is asked to get out of the light by a child drawing geometric shapes and writing formulas on the ground. Motivated by his own prophecy, Ptolemy attempts to stab Alexander, but Alexander prevents him. He then lets Ptolemy escape, stating that Ptolemy's prophecy is unchanged. Alexander turns back to the child's work, and Cassandra asks what he is looking at. Alexander replies that he is witnessing the world he destroyed being reborn.

At this moment, a soldier appears and announces that they are ready to depart for Arabia. As Alexander walks off, it is revealed that the child's name is Euclid, and he pulls out a small version of the Platohedron from his pocket: this implies that the destruction of the world was metaphysical in nature, and that the new world spearheaded by the sciences of Euclidean geometry and Ptolemy I Soter's future breakthroughs has now replaced the old world of Aristotle, Plato and Pythagoras, ushering a new era for all mankind. The final scene depicts Euclid's Platohedron resting on the ground next to his diagrams, catching the sun's dying rays, which transitions into a stark image of a statue and pillar of Alexander, showing him atop his horse and set against the sun and a crimson sky.

== Voice cast ==
Character	Japanese	English (#1–4)	English (#5–13) (Pseudonyms in parentheses)
Alexander	Toshihiko Seki	Andrew Philpot	John DeMita (Will Barrett)
Philotas	Kousuke Meguro	Alex Fernandez	Lex Lang (George Lennon)
Cleitus	Houchu Ohtsuka	John DeMita	John DeMita (Will Barrett)
Haphaestion	Kouji Tsujitani	John DeMita	John DeMita (Will Barrett)
Ptolemy	Shuichi Ikeda	Matt McKenzie	Tom Fahn (Marvin Lee)
Olympias	Junko Mashina	Julia Fletcher	Wendee Lee
Philip	Yoshisada Sakaguchi	John DiMaggio	Bob Papenbrook (John Smallberries)
Aristotle	Nachi Nozawa	John Rafter Lee	Alan Shearman (John Wesley)
Cassandra	Atsuko Tanaka	Denise Poirier	Mary Elizabeth McGlynn (Melissa Williamson)
Parmenion	Tadashi Nakamura	Michael Scott Ryan	Lex Lang (George Lennon)
Attalos	Takeshi Aono	Dwight Schultz	N/A
Darius	Kouichi Yamadera	Carlos Ferro	Lex Lang (George Lennon)
Roxanne	Yuko Minaguchi	Tara Strong	Cindy Robinson
Antipater	Tamio Ōki	John DiMaggio	Alan Shearman (John Wesley)
Antigonos	Daisuke Gōri	N/A	Beau Billingslea (John Daniels)
Diogenes	Kazuo Kumakura	N/A	Roger Rose (Loren Manda)
Phillipos	Tōru Furuya	N/A	Skip Stellrecht (Jack Aubree)
Plato	Tetsurō Sagawa	N/A	Bob Papenbrook (John Smallberries)
Narrator	Shinji Ogawa	Jimmy Silver	Ralph Votrian

== Episodes ==
Note: All episodes of the series were directed by Yoshinori Kanemori and written by Sadayuki Murai.

No.	Title	Storyboarded by (Note: Production staff information is taken from the ending credits of each episode)	Original release date	English air date
1	"A Prophecy Born This Day"; Transliteration: "Maō Tanjō" (Japanese: 魔王誕生)	Masayuki Kojima	September 15, 1999	February 11, 2003
2	"The Thunder of Battle"; Transliteration: "Inbō no Jokyoku" (Japanese: 陰謀の序曲)	Masayuki Kojima	September 22, 1999	February 12, 2003
3	"A Failure of Diplomacy"; Transliteration: "Maō Kaigō" (Japanese: 魔王邂逅)	Masayuki Kojima	September 29, 1999	February 13, 2003
4	"Ascension to the Throne"; Transliteration: "Ansatsu no Onkai" (Japanese: 暗殺の音階)	Masayuki Kojima	October 6, 1999	February 14, 2003
5	"God of Creation"; Transliteration: "Kurueru Sokuratesu" (Japanese: 狂えるソクラテス)	Masakazu Higuchi	October 13, 1999	February 18, 2003
6	"The Secret of Samotrace"; Transliteration: "Samotorake no Majo" (Japanese: サモトラケの魔女)	Toshio Hirata	October 20, 1999	February 19, 2003
7	"The Gordian Knot"; Transliteration: "Gorudion no Kubiki" (Japanese: ゴルディオンのくびき)	Katsuyuki Kodera	October 27, 1999	February 20, 2003
8	"Here Shall Stand Alexandria"; Transliteration: "Mazu Hōkō" (Japanese: 魔都彷徨)	Toshio Hirata	November 3, 1999	February 21, 2003
9	"The Oracle of Ammon"; Transliteration: "Amon no Shintaku" (Japanese: アモンの神託)	Akio Sakai	November 10, 1999	February 25, 2003
10	"Persia Shall Fall"; Transliteration: "Gaugamera no Shitō" (Japanese: ガウガメラの死闘)	Hideo Hayashi	November 17, 1999	February 26, 2003
11	"Unification Before Division"; Transliteration: "Peruseporisu Enjō" (Japanese: ペルセポリス炎上)	Katsuyuki Kodera	November 24, 1999	February 27, 2003
12	"The Vanquished Arise"; Transliteration: "Gyakusatsu Gyō" (Japanese: 虐殺行)	Toshio Hirata	December 1, 1999	February 28, 2003
13	"The Prophecy Comes to Pass"; Transliteration: "Katarushisu" (Japanese: カタルシス)	Osamu Tsuruyama	December 8, 1999	March 4, 2003
