= John DeMita =

American actor

- Born: John Jeremiah DeMita
- Other names: John De Mita; John Demita; John Dimita; Archie Fletcher; Will Barret
- Education: Yale University (BA); American Conservatory Theater (MFA)
- Occupation: Actor
- Years active: 1983–present
- Agent: Chrome Artists Management
- Spouse: Julia Fletcher
- Children: 2, including Elliot Fletcher
- Relatives: Jack Fletcher (brother-in-law)

John Jeremiah DeMita is an American actor. He is married to Julia Fletcher. He is most recognized as the voice of Dosu Kinuta, Hiashi Hyuga and Hizashi Hyuga on the hit anime series Naruto. In addition to his many film roles, he is also notable for his recurring role as Colonel Clifford Blakely, a judge on the U.S. military drama JAG. His teaching credits include College of the Canyons in Santa Clarita, California, El Camino College in Torrance, California and the University of Southern California in Los Angeles, California. He was educated at Yale University. DeMita is represented by Chrome Artists Management, in Los Angeles.

== Dubbing roles ==
=== Anime ===
- Biohunter – Additional voices
- Bleach – Bulbous G
- Code Geass – Joseph Fennette (Ep. 13), Minister of Domestic Affairs (Ep. 5, 12, 22)
- Demon Slayer: Kimetsu no Yaiba – Jigoro Kuwajima
- Dragon Ball Super – Beerus (Bang Zoom! Dub, credited as Archie Fletcher)
- Final Fantasy: Legend of the Crystals – Valkus
- Ghost in the Shell: SAC_2045 – Iino
- Hunter × Hunter 2011 series – Satotz (as Will Barret from Ep. 13 onwards)
- Hurricane Polymar – Joe Kuruma
- JoJo's Bizarre Adventure – Kars
- Magical Girl Pretty Sammy – Biff Standard (Ep. 2)
- Marmalade Boy – Youji Matsura
- Mobile Suit Gundam: Iron-Blooded Orphans – Coral Conrad
- Naruto – Dosu Kinuta, Hiashi Hyuga, Hizashi Hyuga, Kagari
- Naruto Shippuden – Kazuma/Furido, Hiashi Hyuga, Hizashi Hyuga, Sakumo Hatake
- Ninja Scroll TV – Roga, Kawahori, Yamikubo
- One-Punch Man – Silver Fang
- Pet Shop of Horrors – Count D
- Psycho Diver – Kuroiwa
- Reign: The Conqueror – Alexander, Cleitus, Hephaestion
- Sword Gai - Kigetsu
- Tekkaman Blade II – D-Boy
- Tenchi Muyo! Ryo-Ohki – Seiryo (OVA 2, Original)
- Twilight of the Dark Master – Huang Long
- Wild 7 – Kuromatsu
- Yashahime: Princess Half-Demon – Yotsume

=== Film ===
- The Animatrix – Teacher (Kid's Story)
- Black Mask – Michael, Simon, Tsui Chik, Black Mask (English dub)
- Fist of Legend – Chen Zhen (English dub)
- The Bodyguard from Beijing – John Chang (English dub)
- Final Fantasy: The Spirits Within – BCR Soldier, Space Station Technician
- Gen^{13} – Stephen Callahan
- Kiki's Delivery Service – Additional Voices (Disney dub)
- Kingsglaive: Final Fantasy XV – Clarus Amicitia
- Laputa: Castle in the Sky – Additional Voices (Disney dub)
- Lilo & Stitch – Additional Voices
- Mobile Suit Gundam Thunderbolt: December Sky – J.J. Sexton
- NiNoKuni – Old Man (Netflix dub)
- Princess Mononoke – Kohroku
- Resident Evil: Vendetta – Glenn Arias
- Tenchi Muyo! in Love – Sabato
- Wonder Park – Police Officer
- Vampire Hunter D: Bloodlust – Alan Elbourne, Priest

=== Video games ===
- AI: The Somnium Files – Nirvana Initiative – So Sejima
- Binary Domain – Cain, Major Philips
- Demon Slayer: Kimetsu no Yaiba – The Hinokami Chronicles – Zenitsu's Master
- Eraser – Turnabout – Harry Reese
- Final Fantasy X – Luzzu
- Final Fantasy X-2 – Barkeep, Hypello, Barthello
- Final Fantasy XII – Additional Voices
- Final Fantasy XV: Episode Ardyn - Clarus Amicitia
- One-Punch Man: A Hero Nobody Knows - Silverfang
- Valkyria Chronicles – Kreis Czherny
- Vampire Hunter D – D, Grove
- AI: The Somnium Files – So Sejima

== Filmography ==
=== Live action roles ===
==== Television ====
- 18 Wheels of Justice – Deputy Director John Keane
- Brotherly Love – Greg Anderson
- Child of Darkness, Child of Light – Vatican priest
- Conan the Adventurer – Ursath
- CSI: Crime Scene Investigation – Jason Garbett
- Down the Shore – Elliot
- Freddy's Nightmares – Tom
- Hooperman
- Hunter – Young Agent
- I Know My First Name Is Steven – Dan Smith
- Inherit the Wind – Harry Y. Esterbrook
- JAG – Col. Clifford Blakely
- Jojo’s Bizarre Adventure — Kars
- Knots Landing – Eric Thomas
- L.A. Law – Jerry McVey
- Life of the Party: The Pamela Harriman Story – Peter Duchin
- Matlock – Hornsby
- Ned and Stacey – Bob
- Once and Again – Caller
- Party of Five – Sales Clerk
- Perry Mason: The Case of the Lethal Lesson – Scott McDonald
- Reign: The Conqueror – Cleitus, Haphaestion
- Remington Steele – Carl
- Santa Barbara – Arthur Newton
- Spawn – Additional Voices
- Silk Stalkings – Quinn
- Sliders – Dr. Steven Jensen
- Star Trek: The Next Generation – Romulan
- The Facts of Life – Mr. Horn
- The Jackie Thomas Show – Sam #2
- The Pursuit of Happiness
- The Twilight Zone – George
- Tour of Duty – Lt. Henry Driscoll

==== Film ====
- Jackie Chan's Project A – Tze
- Josh Kirby... Time Warrior: Chapter 2, the Human Pets – William of Dearborn
- Josh Kirby... Time Warrior: Chapter 1, Planet of the Dino-Knights – William of Dearborn
- Leprechaun 3 – Fazio
- Megiddo: The Omega Code 2 – Chuck Farrell
- Spellbinder – Brad
- Steel and Lace – Agent Spoon
- The Opposite Sex and How to Live with Them – Chipper
- Thru the Moebius Strip – Guard
- Universal Soldier – TV News Crew
- Waking Up in Reno – Additional Voices
- Without Warning – Major Powers
