= Vampire Hunter D: Bloodlust =

2001 animated film by Yoshiaki Kawajiri

- American teaser release poster

Japanese name
- Kanji: バンパイアハンターD
Transcriptions
- Revised Hepburn: Banpaia Hantā Dī
- Directed by: Yoshiaki Kawajiri
- Screenplay by: Yoshiaki Kawajiri
- English adaptation by: Ellen Moore; Jack Fletcher
- Based on: Vampire Hunter D: Demon Deathchase by Hideyuki Kikuchi
- Produced by: Mataichirō Yamamoto; Masao Maruyama; Takayuki Nagasawa
- Starring: Pamela Adlon; John DiMaggio; Dwight Schultz; Andy Philpot
- Cinematography: Hitoshi Yamaguchi
- Edited by: Harutoshi Ogata; Satoshi Terauchi; Kashiko Kimura; Yukiko Itō
- Music by: Marco D'Ambrosio
- Production company: Madhouse
- Distributed by: Nippon Herald Films (Japan); Urban Vision (United States)
- Release dates: July 2000 (Fantasia Fest); April 21, 2001 (Japan); September 23, 2001 (United States)
- Running time: 102 minutes
- Countries: Japan; Hong Kong; United States
- Language: English
- Box office: $151,086

Vampire Hunter D: Bloodlust, simply known in Japan as Vampire Hunter D (バンパイアハンターD, Banpaia Hantā Dī), is a 2000 dark fantasy vampire adventure anime film written for the screen and directed by Yoshiaki Kawajiri. It is based on the 1985 novel Vampire Hunter D: Demon Deathchase by Hideyuki Kikuchi.

The film began production in 1997 and was completed with the intention of being shown in American theaters. It was shown in twelve theaters across the United States and received generally positive reception from American critics.

== Plot ==
In the middle of the night, Charlotte Elbourne, a young human woman, is abducted by Baron Meier Link, a vampire nobleman. Charlotte's wealthy father, John, hires D, a dhampir, to rescue her, dead or alive.

At the same time, Charlotte's older brother Alan hires the Marcus Brothers, composed of their leader Borgoff, the hulking Nolt, the blade master Kyle, the frail/physically bedridden psychic Grove, and Leila, a woman who holds a grudge towards vampires. D and the Marcus Brothers race after Meier, learning that Charlotte was not kidnapped but chose to accompany him out of love for the vampire.

Meier hires the mutant Barbarois to guard him, consisting of the shapeshifter Caroline, the shadow manipulator Bengé, and the werewolf Mashira. Nolt is killed by Bengé, resulting in the brothers confronting the Barbarois in their home territory. At the same time, D visits them. Grove causes a large ruckus using his psychic powers, and D becomes trapped in a void that Bengé creates. D escapes the void, and the Marcus Brothers avenge Nolt by killing Bengé. They then travel to a nearby western town, where Leila convinces the local sheriff to stop D. Fortunately, D is saved by an old man who recalls the dhampir rescuing him as a child from a vampire.

Meier's carriage stops to rest during the daytime, and Charlotte wanders out, meeting D and Leila. The two fight against Caroline while Mashira escapes with the carriage. D defeats Caroline but is forced to seek shelter after absorbing too much sunlight due to Heat Syndrome—(a condition that is common among half-vampires). Leila faces a revived Caroline and survives only by chance when lightning strikes the mutant, killing her instantly. She takes shelter with D after and reveals that a vampire back in her childhood kidnapped her mother. This resulted in her being stoned to death by the people of her hometown when she returned as a completely different person and killed her father. Leila joined the Marcus Brothers to avenge her parents' deaths. The two make a pact to visit each other's graves upon who dies first.

The Marcus Brothers trap Meier's carriage on a bridge by bombing it and carjacking Charlotte. However, their trap is foiled by Mashira's enhanced senses, resulting in Kyle being killed and Borgoff falling off the bridge but surviving, losing an eye. Meier and Charlotte reach the Castle of Chaythe, where Countess Carmilla Elizabeth Bathory awaits them. Meanwhile, Mashira stays behind to fight D, but the vampire hunter slays him.

It is then revealed that Meier and Charlotte had reached out to the Countess, hoping they could fly to the City of the Night, a vampire refuge located in space. However, Carmilla betrays the couple, temporarily slaying Meier and tricking Charlotte into being bitten. Revived by Charlotte's blood, she uses hallucinations to haunt D, Borgoff, and Leila. D is unaffected and saves Leila from her hallucinations depicting her tragic childhood, but Borgoff is tricked and turned. Grove reappears and saves Leila by blowing up the now vampiric Borgoff with an embrace. He then dies as a result. D confronts Carmilla and is able to destroy her spirit whilst a reawakened Meier destroys her physical body. D and Meier then clash for a final time, with D gaining the upper hand. The final battle ends after D spares Meier's life and leaves the castle with Leila while taking Charlotte's ring as proof for her father and brother. As Meier uses the castle's ship to depart to the City of the Night, D and Leila look on, with Leila wishing the vampire success.

Years later, a funeral is held for Leila, with a large crowd attending. Among the crowd is Leila's granddaughter, who recognizes D from a distance and invites him to spend time with her family, but he kindly refuses. D reveals he is glad Leila was wrong about nobody being at her funeral and leaves contentedly.

== Voice cast ==
Character	English	Japanese
D	Andy Philpot	Hideyuki Tanaka
Meier Link	John Rafter Lee	Kōichi Yamadera
Leila	Pamela Adlon	Megumi Hayashibara; Akiko Yajima (Young)
Charlotte Elbourne	Wendee Lee	Emi Shinohara
D's Left Hand	Mike McShane	Ichirō Nagai
Carmilla	Julia Fletcher	Bibari Maeda
Borgoff Marcus	Matt McKenzie	Yūsaku Yara
Nolt Marcus	John DiMaggio	Ryūzaburō Ōtomo
Kyle Marcus	Alex Fernandez	Houchu Ohtsuka
Grove Marcus	Jack Fletcher	Toshihiko Seki
Polk	John Hostetter	Takeshi Aono
Sheriff	John DiMaggio	Rikiya Koyama
Bengé	Dwight Schultz	Keiji Fujiwara
Caroline	Mary Elizabeth McGlynn	Yōko Sōmi
Mashira	John DiMaggio	Rintarou Nishi
John Elbourne	John DiMaggio	Motomu Kiyokawa
Alan Elbourne	John DeMita	Koji Tsujitani
Priest	John DeMita	Unshō Ishizuka
Leila's Granddaughter	Debi Derryberry	Mika Kanai
Old Man of Barbarois	Dwight Schultz	Chikao Ōtsuka
D's Mother	Julia Fletcher	Chiharu Suzuka

== Production ==
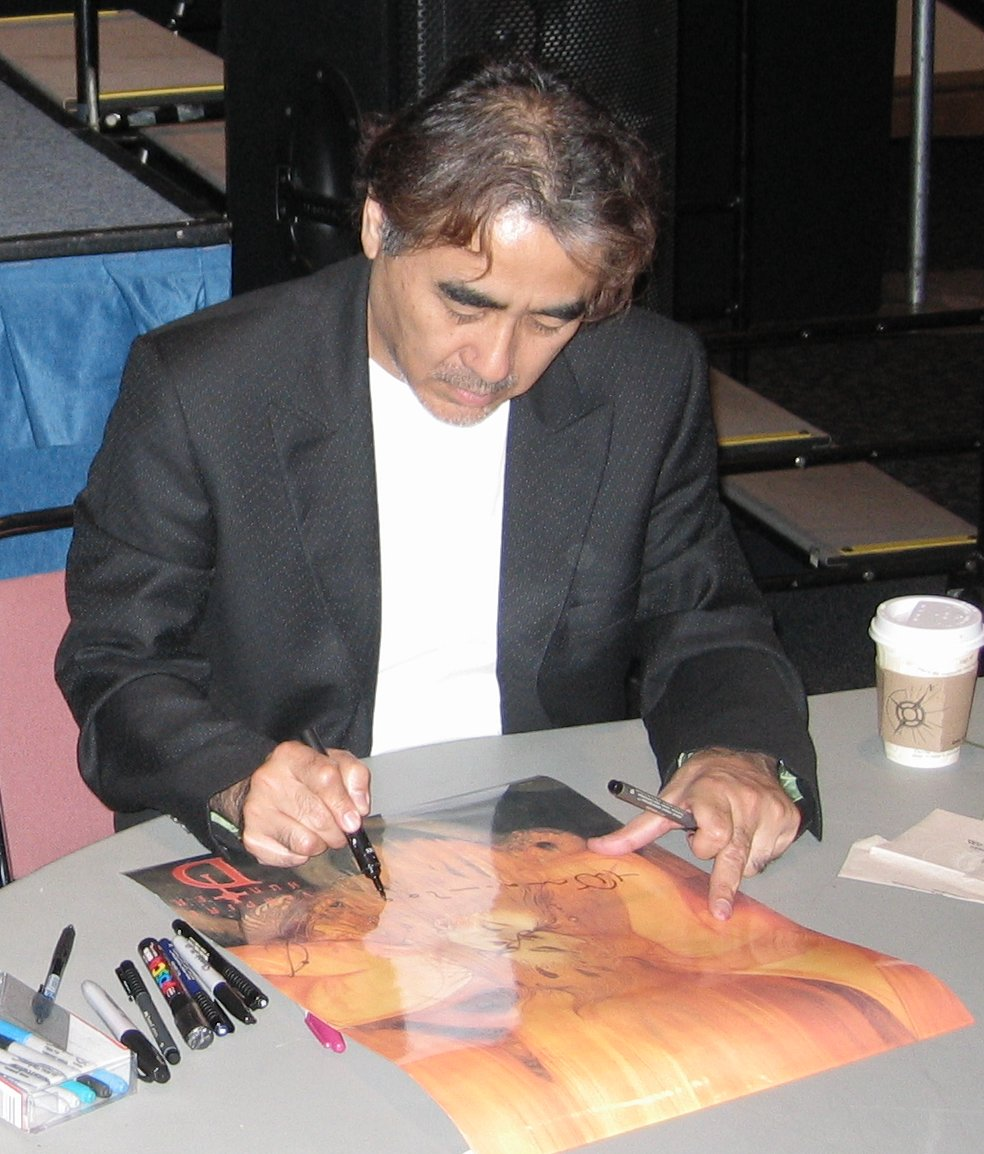
Yoshitaka Amano created the design for the main character in Vampire Hunter D: Bloodlust.

The idea for a new Vampire Hunter D film came after there was a fan demand to make a follow-up to Vampire Hunter D (1985). Hideyuki Kikuchi was also in favor of this as he had often complained about the "cheapness" in the look of the original film. Plans for a new film started in 1997 by director Yoshiaki Kawajiri and production company Madhouse. Around the same time, producer Mataichirō Yamamoto wanted to pick up the rights to Madhouse's Wicked City alongside the original Vampire Hunter D film. During the discussion about both productions, Yamamoto heard about the new Vampire Hunter D film and wanted to not only get involved with video distribution, but in production, with the goal to give the film a possible theatrical release in America.

The story of Vampire Hunter D: Bloodlust is based on the third novel in Kikuchi's series D - Demon Deathchase. The main character's design is by artist Yoshitaka Amano. Amano's art style was matched for the rest of the characters in the film by animation director Yutaka Minowa. The animation for the film was created in the Madhouse Studios in Tokyo while the post-production work was done in California. The English soundtrack for the film was recorded in 1999 before the Japanese dialogue was finished. The film's title of Vampire Hunter D: Bloodlust was a last-minute decision to distinguish it from the first film.

== Release ==
=== Theatrical ===
To promote the film, a two-and-a-half-minute-long trailer was finished in 1998 and was shown at American anime fan conventions. A work-in-progress print was shown in 2000 at the Fantasia Film Festival in July in Montreal and at the New York Anime Film Festival in October 2000.

The completed version of the film was only released theatrically in an English-language version. On its Japanese theatrical release, it was subtitled in Japanese. It premiered on September 23, 2001, in America where it played in six theaters before expanding to twelve. It grossed $25,521 in this run and $151,086 in total, making it the highest-grossing Japanese film ever in a language other than Japanese. GKIDS announced on August 22, 2026, that they had acquired North American distribution rights to the film and would have select screenings of the Japanese-language version with English subtitles in fall 2026 before receiving a full theatrical and home entertainment release in 2027.

=== Home video ===
Urban Vision released the movie on DVD and VHS on February 12, 2002, and it was listed at #7 on the Billboard Top DVD Sales chart for the week of March 9, 2002. Then on February 3, 2015, Discotek Media announced their license to release the movie for Blu-ray on September 8, 2015, and DVD on September 22, 2015, however, due to licensing restrictions, all releases, including all three home video releases in the U.S. have the original English audio only.

In Japan, the film was released on DVD on December 19, 2001, by Avex Entertainment, in English audio with Japanese subtitles. Avex explained that due to size constraints and to maintain the disc's quality, the DVD did not include the Japanese audio track but would considering releasing one in the future. The DVD with Japanese audio was later released on June 19, 2002. A remastered version, scanned from the original 35mm film negative and containing both Japanese and English audio tracks, was released on Blu-ray on March 26, 2025.

== Reception ==
The film received generally favorable reviews from American critics. The review aggregator Rotten Tomatoes reported that 72% of critics have given the film a positive review based on 32 reviews, with an average rating of 6.4/10. The site's critics consensus reads, "Vampire Hunter D's gothic charms may be lost on those unfamiliar with the anime series that spawned it, but the crisp action and nightmarish style will satiate horror aficionados' bloodlust." It received a rating of 62 on the website Metacritic based on 15 critic reviews, indicating "generally favorable reviews". The Chicago Reader gave a favorable review of the film, referring to it as a "gorgeously animated surrealist adventure". The New York Daily News referred to the film as "Beautiful, witty and provocative" and that it should "appeal to fans and non-fans alike". The San Francisco Chronicle praised the director Yoshiaki Kawajiri stating that he "has a gift for striking visuals" but also noted that "his story manages to be simultaneously thin and chaotic."

== See also ==
- Japanese films of 2000
- List of horror films of 2000
