= Seizō Katō =

Japanese voice actor

- 加藤 精三
- Born: February 14, 1927; Tokyo, Japan
- Died: January 17, 2014 (aged 86); Itabashi, Tokyo, Japan
- Occupations: Actor; voice actor; narrator
- Years active: 1956–2014
- Agent: Haikyo
- Spouse: Setsuko Katō

Seizō Katō (加藤 精三, Katō Seizō; February 14, 1927 – January 17, 2014) was a Japanese actor, voice actor and narrator who worked for Haikyo (Tokyo Actor's Consumer's Cooperative Society).

Kato was born in Tokyo. He was noted for his role as Megatron and Galvatron from the 1st Transformers series until Transformers: The Headmasters. He also did the ADR for Takeshi Katō's character in Akira Kurosawa's Ran after the original actor had become injured.

He died of bladder cancer at a hospital in Itabashi, Tokyo on January 17, 2014 at age 86.

== Filmography ==
=== Television animation ===
- Kimba the White Lion (1965) – Totto
- Star of the Giants (1968) – Ittetsu Hoshi
- Blocker Gundan 4 Machine Blaster (1976) – Professor Genrai Yuri
- Chōdenji Machine Voltes V (1977) – Dr. Hamaguchi
- Kagaku Ninja-Tai Gatchaman F (1978) – Sosai Z
- Fist of the North Star (1984) – Barcom
- Star Musketeer Bismark (1984) – Hyuza
- Transformers: The Headmasters (1987) – Galvatron
- Detective Conan (1996–2014) – Police chief Kiyonaga Matsumoto
- Outlaw Star (1998) – Hazanko
- Cyborg 009: The Cyborg Soldier (2002) – Gamo Whisky
- Ninja Scroll: The Series (2003) – Anden Yamidoro
- Gokusen (2004) – Fuji
- Shigurui: Death Frenzy (2007) – Kogan Iwamoto
- Golgo 13 (2008) (Chief Jerome Knight) (ep. 12)
- Fullmetal Alchemist: Brotherhood (2009) – Priest Cornello
- Panty & Stocking with Garterbelt (2010) – Minge-atron (Japanese: Mestron) (ep. 7A)
- Blade (2011) – Council Chairman (eps. 8, 11)

=== Original video animation (OVA) ===
- Vampire Hunter D (1985) – Count Magnus Lee
- Transformers: Scramble City (1986) – Megatron
- Crying Freeman (1988) – Larry Park
- Ronin Warriors (1989) – Shikaisen
- Guyver (1989) – Dr. Hamilcar Barcas
- Legend of Galactic Heroes (1989) – Viscount Kleingelt
- Tenchi Muyo! (1992) – Dr. Clay
- Hyper Doll (1995) – Dr. Zaiclit
- Gunsmith Cats (1995) – Edward Haints
- Fire Emblem (1995) – Jeigan
- Z-Mind (1999) – Jim Pekinpah

=== Animated films ===
- Ringing Bell (1978) – The Wolf
- Doraemon: Nobita's Dinosaur (1980) – Black Mask
- Ideon (1982) – Gindoro Jinma
- SF New Age Lensman (1984) – Lord Helmuth
- Vampire Hunter D (1985) – Lee
- The Plot of the Fuma Clan (1987) – Inspector Zenigata
- Doraemon: Nobita's Dorabian Nights (1991) – Abdil
- Tottoi (1992) – Nanni
- Apfelland Monogatari (1992) – General Nolbelt
- Crayon Shin-chan: Unkokusai's Ambition (1995) – Unkokusai
- Slayers Great (1997) – Galia Einburg
- Twilight of the Dark Master (1997) – Takamiya (Male Form)
- Tokyo Godfathers (2003) – Mother
- Naruto Shippuden the Movie: Bonds (2007) – Môryô
- Detective Conan: The Raven Chaser (2009) – Kiyonaga Matsumoto

=== Video games ===
- BS Zelda no Densetsu (1995) – Ganon
- Everybody's Golf 4 (2003) – Arthur
- DreamMix TV World Fighters (2003) – Megatron
- Suikoden V (2006) – Gallen, Genoh
- Tengai Makyou: Ziria (2006)
- LittleBigPlanet 2 (2011) – Dr. Herbert Higginbotham (Japanese Dub)

=== Live-action films ===
- Ran (1985) – Koyata Hatakeyama (voice)
- Dororo (2007)
- Pussy Soup (2008) – William Thomas Jefferson II (voice)

=== Live-action television ===
- Kaze to Kumo to Niji to (1976)
- Ōgon no Hibi (1978) – Hosokawa Fujitaka
- Tokugawa Ieyasu (1983) – Watanabe Moritsuna

=== Tokusatsu ===
- Ultraman (1967) – Alien Mefilas (ep. 22)
- Battle Fever J (1979) – Black Mask Monster (ep. 27)
- Dengeki Sentai Changeman (1985–1986) – Star King Bazoo (actor by Kazuto Kuwahara)
- Hikari Sentai Maskman (1987–1988) – Earth Emperor Zeba
- Kamen Rider Black RX (1988–1989) – General Jark (eps. 1 – 44)
- Chikyu Sentai Fiveman (1991) – Galactic Super Beast Vulgyre (eps. 46 – 48)
- Super Rescue Solbrain (1991–1992) – SolDozer
- Kyōryū Sentai Zyuranger (1992–1993) – Great Satan (eps. 30, 31 & 47 – 50) (actor by Ren Urano)
- Juukou B-Fighter (1995) – Mercenary Gorgodal (ep. 23)
- Gekisou Sentai Carranger (1996) – QQ Kyuutan (ep. 6)
- B-Fighter Kabuto (1997) – Darkness Devil Beast Zadan (ep. 44)
- Denji Sentai Megaranger vs Carranger (1998) – Helmedor
- Seijuu Sentai Gingaman vs Megaranger (1999) – Captain Gregory
- Ninpuu Sentai Hurricaneger (2002) – "It"
- Kamen Rider 555: Paradise Lost (2003) – Wirepullers of Smart Brain (Actor) (actor of Shōzō Iizuka, Gorō Naya)
- Tokusou Sentai Dekaranger (2004) – Detective Chou〈Teranian Chou San〉 (ep. 35)
- Ultraman Mebius (2007) – Alien Mefilas (ep. 43 – 47)
- Kamen Rider Decade: All Riders vs. Great Shocker (2009) – General Jark
- OOO, Den-O, All Riders: Let's Go Kamen Riders (2011) – General Jark

=== Dubbing roles ===
==== Live-action ====
- Breakheart Pass, Nathan (Ben Johnson)
- Captain Scarlet and the Mysterons, Captain Black
- Coming to America, Cleo McDowell (John Amos)
- Death Warrant, Hawkins (Robert Guillaume)
- Divine Secrets of the Ya-Ya Sisterhood, Shepherd James "Shep" Walker (James Garner)
- Dune, Gurney Halleck (Patrick Stewart)
- For Your Eyes Only, Ernst Stavro Blofeld (Peter Marinker)
- The Godfather (1976 NTV edition), Jack Woltz (John Marley)
- Gorky Park, Major Pribluda (Rikki Fulton)
- Home Alone, Marley (Roberts Blossom)
- Nineteen Eighty-Four, Mr. Charrington (Cyril Cusack)
- Parenthood (1994 TV Tokyo edition), Frank Buckman (Jason Robards)
- The Passage, The Gypsy (Christopher Lee)
- Predator (1993 TV Asahi edition), Major General Homer Philips (R. G. Armstrong)
- Raw Deal (1991 TV Asahi edition), FBI Agent Harry Shannon (Darren McGavin)
- Red Dawn, Colonel Strelnikov (William Smith)
- Seven (1999 TV Tokyo/2001 TV Asahi editions), Police Captain (R. Lee Ermey)
- Star Trek: Deep Space Nine, Odo (René Auberjonois)
- Tron, Master Control Program (David Warner)
- Zombi 2 (1982 TBS edition), Dr. David Menard (Richard Johnson)

==== Animation ====
- DuckTales – Old Man?
- The Jungle Book (1994 Buena Vista edition) – Shere Khan
- The Transformers – Megatron, Galvatron, Devastator
- The Transformers: The Movie – Megatron, Galvatron
- We're Back! A Dinosaur's Story – Professor Screweyes
- X-Men (TV Tokyo edition) – Emperor D'Ken
