= Twilight of the Dark Master =

Manga by Saki Okuse

- Manga cover art

支配者の黄昏 (Shihaisha no Tasogare)
- Genre: Drama, Horror
- Manga
- Written by: Saki Okuse
- Published by: Shinshokan
- English publisher: NA: Digital Manga Publishing
- Magazine: Wings
- Published: December 20, 1991
- Volumes: 1
- Original video animation
- Directed by: Akiyuki Shinbo
- Produced by: Masao Maruyama; Naoko Takahashi; Masanori Sakamoto; Yaemi Aoki
- Written by: Duane Dell'Amico; Tatsuhiko Urahata
- Music by: Keishi Urata
- Studio: Madhouse (Note: Production assistance (制作協力) provided by Daume.)
- Licensed by: AUS: Madman Entertainment; NA: Urban Vision; UK: MVM Films
- Released: November 11, 1997 (United States); January 21, 1998 (Japan)
- Runtime: 45 minutes

Twilight of the Dark Master (支配者の黄昏, Shihaisha no Tasogare) is a Japanese manga by Saki Okuse, and an OVA adaptation. The OVA was produced by Masao Maruyama, directed by Akiyuki Shinbo, and the screenplay was written by Duane Dell'Amico and Tatsuhiko Urahata. It was distributed and licensed in 1997 by Urban Vision.

== Plot ==
Long ago, the Great Mother Spirit created demons, guardians, and humans. During 2089, only a few demons and guardians remain and in the city of Neo-Shinjuku. The guardian, Tsunami Shijo (an ancient fire manipulator from days long ago) is out to aid a fledgling human race. Tsunami is looking for a human who was transformed into a monster by mutagneic drugs. This leads him to Mr. Takamiya, the Demon leader, who killed his lover.

Tsunami becomes involved with a woman who just lost her fiancé and her arm, and now wants to figure out why this has happened. Meanwhile, the Demon leader is still alive and plotting to enslave mankind.

== Cast ==
Japanese Cast

- Tsunami Shijo - Toshihiko Seki
- Shizuka Tachibana - Emi Shinohara
- Huang Long - Akira Kamiya
- Chen Long - Urara Takano
- Tenku - Hiroya Ishimaru
- Kudo - Kaneto Shiozawa
- Takamiya - Seizō Katō, Atsuko Takahata
- Police Inspector Kumazawa - Takaya Hashi
- Eiji Kuraza - Kunihiko Yasui
- Kizaki - Masuo Amada
- Tajima - Takehiro Murozono
- Junk - Naoki Tatsuta
- Squad Leader - Yasuhiko Kawazu
- Receptionist - Miho Yamada
- Voice of Car Navigator - Mizue Otsuka
- Glider Officer - Koji Yusa
- Girl #1 - Shihori Niwa
- Girl #2 - Yuri Sato
- Officer #1 - Yasumoto Kasahara
- Narrator - Atsuko Takahata

English Cast

- Tsunami Shijo - Andy Philpot
- Shizuka Tachibana - Denise Poirier
- Huang Long - John DeMita
- Chen Long - Julia DeMita
- Tenku - Matt K. Miller
- Kudo - Steve Bulan
- Takamiya - Barbara Goodson
- Police Inspector Kumazawa - John Hostetter
- Eiji Kuraza - Jack Fletcher
- Tajima - Seth Margolies
- Junk - Matt McKenzie

== Manga ==
Shinshokan originally published the series in December 1991. The series was published in English in May 2005 by Digital Manga Publishing.

== Original video animation ==
An original video animation (OVA) by Madhouse, produced by Masao Maruyama, directed by Akiyuki Shinbo, and the screenplay was written by Duane Dell'Amico and Tatsuhiko Urahata.

The OVA was licensed for an English release by Urban Vision.
