= Thru the Moebius Strip =

- Directed by: Glenn Chaika; Kelvin Lee
- Written by: Jim Cox
- Produced by: Raymond Neoh; David Kirschner; Jun Aida
- Starring: Jonathan Taylor Thomas; Chris Marquette; Mark Hamill; Michael Dorn; Andrea Leon; Peri Gilpin; Kellie Martin; Daniel Davis; Dee Bradley Baker; John DeMita; Kevin McDonald; Jim Romanovich
- Edited by: Bob Bender; Lois Freeman-Cox
- Music by: Nathan Lanier; Olivier Lliboutry
- Release date: December 30, 2005
- Running time: 87 minutes
- Country: China
- Language: Mandarin
- Budget: CN¥156 million (US$20 million)
- Box office: CN¥3.650 million (China)

Thru the Moebius Strip (Chinese: 魔比斯环; pinyin: móbǐsī huán) is a 2005 American-Chinese animated science fiction adventure film made in Mainland China.

== Plot ==
A 14-year-old boy grew up refusing to accept the loss of his father. He reaches the planet Raphicca 27.2 million light years away to find that his father is a prisoner in a kingdom of giant aliens who believe in magic and a medieval code of chivalry. In the midst of a raging battle between good and evil, Jac rescues his father, his new-found family of aliens, the planet of Raphicca, and ultimately, the universe.

== Cast ==
Name	English dubbing actor
Narrator	Andrea Miller
Young Jac	Michelle Ruff
Simon Weir	Mark Hamill
Caroline Weir	Peri Gilpin
Young Ragis	Daisy Torme
Shepway	Jean Simmons
Jac Weir	Chris Marquette
Allana	Kellie Martin
Prince Ragis	Jonathan Taylor Thomas
King Tor	Michael Dorn

== Background ==
The film was produced in Shenzhen, China by the Institute of Digital Media Technology (IDMT). The project began with 200 animators in 2000 and grew to employ more than 400 by the end of production. Unlike traditional Chinese films, the movie was dubbed into English first. Previewed at the Second International Animation and Cartoon Festival at Hangzhou, China on April 27 and May 3, 2006, The film was based on an original story and designs by Jean "Moebius" Giraud.

== Reception ==
=== Box office ===
The film earned CN¥3.650 million at the Chinese box office.

=== Critical reception ===
The film premiered at the Cannes Film Festival in 2005 and received good reviews for the animation work. However film critics have emphasized that the story was mostly catered to the west with eastern elements added in, making it difficult to satisfy any group of audience in any one particular region.

== See also ==
- History of Chinese animation
- List of computer-animated films
- List of animated feature films
