= Bio Hunter =

Film based on a manga series of the same name

- DVD cover of Bio Hunter

バイオ・ハンター (Baio Hantā)
- Genre: Action; Mystery; Psychological horror
- Manga
- Written by: Fujihiko Hosono
- Published by: Scola
- Magazine: Comic Burger
- Original run: 1989 – 1990
- Volumes: 1
- Original video animation
- Directed by: Yūzō Satō
- Produced by: Mataichirō Yamamoto; Masao Maruyama; Naoko Takahashi
- Written by: Yoshiaki Kawajiri
- Music by: Masamichi Amano
- Studio: Madhouse
- Licensed by: AUS: Madman Entertainment; NA: Urban Vision (Expired); UK: MVM Films
- Released: December 8, 1995
- Runtime: 60 minutes
- icon

Bio Hunter (バイオ・ハンター, Baio Hantā) is a Japanese manga series authored by Fujihiko Hosono. It tells the story about two molecular biologists, Koshigaya and Komada who take on humans with strange viruses that make them less human and more demonic. It was serialized in the Scola manga magazine Comic Burger.

The manga was also adapted into an hour-long single-episode anime OVA, produced by Madhouse Studios and Toei Video, directed by Yuzo Sato and scripted by Yoshiaki Kawajiri. It was distributed throughout the United States and Canada by Urban Vision. The English dub is distributed by MVM Films in the United Kingdom and Madman Entertainment in Australia and New Zealand.

The movie has similar animation and dark urban fantasy themes that Kawajiri worked on before and after Bio Hunter, such as Ninja Scroll, Devilman OVA, X/1999 anime TV series, and Gungrave. Kawajiri, Yamamoto and Maruyama worked again as a team between 1997 and 2000 in making the Madhouse's Vampire Hunter D: Bloodlust.

== Plot ==
Two scientists are attempting to distribute the cure for a demon virus that is affecting people all over Japan, however, things have become complicated. One of them has become infected. So begins his battle with himself, as he attempts to not only control his emerging demon side, but also to save the lives of others by wielding its great strength.

== Characters ==
Komada
Voiced by: Toshihiko Seki (Japanese); Matt McKenzie (English)
Koshigaya
Voiced by: Kazuhiko Inoue (Japanese); Matt K. Miller (English)
Sayaka
Voiced by: Yuko Minaguchi (Japanese); Sherry Lynn (English)
Bokudō
Voiced by: Chikao Ōtsuka (Japanese); Mike Reynolds (English)
Tabe
Voiced by: Tarô Ishida (Japanese); Barry Stigler (English)
Mikawa
Voiced by: Ryūzaburō Ōtomo (Japanese); Jamie Hanes (English)
Mary
Voiced by: Rei Igarashi (Japanese); Barbara Goodson (English)
Boss
Voiced by: Yutaka Shimaka (Japanese); John Hostetter (English)
Police Officer
Voiced by: Daiki Nakamura (Japanese); TBA (English)
