= Toshihiko Seki =

Japanese voice actor and singer

- 関 俊彦
- Born: June 11, 1962 (age 64); Sendai, Miyagi Prefecture, Japan
- Occupations: Actor; voice actor; singer
- Years active: 1983–present
- Agent: 81 Produce

Toshihiko Seki (関 俊彦, Seki Toshihiko) (born June 11, 1962) is a Japanese actor, voice actor, singer, and narrator. In June 2004, Seki was honored by the readers of Animage Magazine in the 26th Annual Reader's Poll, where he was ranked the 9th favorite voice actor, largely in recognition of his performance as Rau Le Creuset from Mobile Suit Gundam SEED. In August 2007 the Anime News Network called him one of the more prolific male voice actors with 215 roles credited to his name. Seki often voices characters who are very serious or easily agitated like Duo Maxwell in Mobile Suit Gundam Wing, Iruka Umino in Naruto, Kaien Shiba in Bleach, and Genjo Sanzo in Saiyuki. He also played deranged villains like Legato Bluesummers, Rau Le Creuset, Embryo, Il Dottore, and Muzan Kibutsuji. His most famous role is the Imagin Momotaros from Kamen Rider Den-O, reprising the role numerous productions since then. In 2023, he starred as the voice of the titular character in Pluto.

== Filmography ==
=== Anime series ===
1987

- Akai Koudan Zillion, J.J.

1988

- F, Gunma Akagi
- Saint Seiya, Alioth Epsilon Fenrir

1989

- Oishinbo, Ryōzō Okaboshi
- Ranma ½, Mousse
- Legend of Heavenly Sphere Shurato, Shurato
- Madö King Granzört, Haribakka ̄
- Yawara!, Kosaku Matsuda

1990

- Idol Angel Yokoso Yoko, Akira Hayami
- Mashin Hero Wataru 2, Tsuppari ̄, Nikisaku

1991

- Future GPX Cyber Formula, Bleed Kaga
- Honō no Tōkyūji: Dodge Danpei, Taiga Nikaidō

1992

- Oi! Ryoma, Ryōma Sakamoto (Adult)

1993

- Nintama Rantarō, Doi-sensei, Ninja

1995

- Mobile Suit Gundam Wing, Duo Maxwell
- Neon Genesis Evangelion, Asuka's Father

1996

- Kaiketsu Zorro, Zorro/Don Diego de la Vega

1997

- Hyper Police, Sakunoshin Chikura

1998

- Weiß Kreuz, Knight
- Outlaw Star, Fred Luo, Ark Manaf
- Silent Möbius, Genvara
- Trigun, Legato Bluesummers
- Bomberman B-Daman Bakugaiden, Kurobon

1999

- Pet Shop of Horrors, Count D
- Alexander Senki, Alexander

2000

- Bomberman B-Daman Bakugaiden Victory, Kurobon
- Baby Felix, Felix
- Yami no Matsuei, Watari Yutaka
- Gensomaden Saiyuki, Genjo Sanzo

2001

- Final Fantasy: Unlimited, Cid
- Fruits Basket, Momiji's Father
- Rave Master, Shuda

2002

- Mirage of Blaze, Takaya Ougi
- RahXephon, Makoto Isshiki
- Naruto, Iruka Umino, Narrator
- Mobile Suit Gundam SEED, Rau Le Creuset
- Samurai Deeper Kyo, Benitora

2003

- Saiyuki Reload, Genjo Sanzo
- Zatch Bell!, Apollo
- Fullmetal Alchemist, Belsio
- Kousetsu Hyaku Monogatari, Momosuke

2004

- Paranoia Agent, Mitsuhiro Maniwa
- Area 88, Mickey Simon
- My-HiME, Reito Kanzaki
- Mobile Suit Gundam SEED Destiny, Rey Za Burrel
- Meine Liebe, Ludwig
- Saiyuki Reload Gunlock, Genjo Sanzo

2005

- Bleach, Kaien Shiba
- MÄR, Danna Toramizu
- My-Otome, Rado

2006

- Spider Riders, Buguese
- Koi suru Tenshi Angelique, Luva
- Saiunkoku Monogatari, Rio Hyo, Sr.

2007

- Keroro Gunsou, Urere
- Higurashi When They Cry, Kyosuke Irie
- Naruto: Shippuden, Iruka Umino
- Kamen Rider Den-O + Shin-O, Momotaros, Kamen Rider Den-O Sword Form
- Nagasarete Airantō, Kiyomasa, Benyasha

2008

- Toaru Majutsu no Index, Aleister Crowley
- Gunslinger Girl, Nino
- Kamen Rider Den-O: Imagin Anime (Momotaros)
- Yu-Gi-Oh! 5D's, Professor Frank

2009

- One Piece, Duval
- Bleach, Aaroniero Arruruerie

2010

- Katanagatari, Umigame Maniwa
- Sgt. Frog, Reiji
- Psychic Detective Yakumo, Isshin Saito

2012

- Pretty Rhythm: Aurora Dream, Pietro Takamine
- Smile PreCure!, Hiroshi Hoshizora
- Hunter × Hunter (2011), Wing

2013

- Valvrave the Liberator, Soichi Tokishima
- Pretty Rhythm: Rainbow Live, Hijiri Himuro
- Kill la Kill, Senketsu
- Gingitsune, Tatsuo Saeki

2014

- Cross Ange, Embryo

2015

- Symphogear GX, Akira Tachibana
- Saint Seiya: Soul of Gold, Scorpio Milo

2016

- Cardfight!! Vanguard G: GIRS Crisis (Season 2), Kensuke Handa
- Cardfight!! Vanguard G: Stride Gate (Season 3), Kensuke Handa
- Mob Psycho 100, Musashi Goda

2017

- The Laughing Salesman NEW
- Descending Stories: Showa Genroku Rakugo Shinju, Eisuke Higuchi
- Boruto: Naruto Next Generations, Iruka Umino
- Saiyuki Reload Blast, Genjo Sanzo
- Elegant Yokai Apartment Life, Naomi Chiaki

2018

- Gyakuten Saiban, Aiga Hoshiidake
- Golden Kamuy, Henmi Kazuo

2019

- Demon Slayer: Kimetsu no Yaiba, Muzan Kibutsuji
- If It's for My Daughter, I'd Even Defeat a Demon Lord, Randolph
- Star Twinkle PreCure, Toto

2020

- Plunderer, Schmerman Bach
- Higurashi: When They Cry – Gou, Kyosuke Irie
- Our Last Crusade or the Rise of a New World, Salinger

2021

- Higurashi: When They Cry – Sotsu, Kyosuke Irie
- The Fruit of Evolution, God
- The Vampire Dies in No Time, Tsujigiri Nagiri
- Demon Slayer: Kimetsu no Yaiba, Muzan Kibutsuji

2022

- Saiyuki Reload: Zeroin, Genjo Sanzo
- Mob Psycho 100 III, Musashi Goda

2023

- High Card, Norman Kingstadt
- The Most Heretical Last Boss Queen, Clark
- Pluto, Sahad / Pluto

2024

- The Misfit of Demon King Academy 2nd Season, Ahid Alovo Agartz
- I Parry Everything, Caroux
- Demon Slayer: Kimetsu no Yaiba, Muzan Kibutsuji
- Tōhai, Hideharu Seki

2025

- Trillion Game, Tōru Hebijima
- Ranma ½, Mousse
- Sanda, Hifumi Ōshibu

2026

- My Ribdiculous Reincarnation, Tanaka-san
- The Ghost in the Shell, Sohei Kagasaki

=== Original video animation ===
1986

- Call Me Tonight, Hayata

1987

- Gakuen Tokusou Hikaruon, Hikaru Shihodo

1988

- Dragon Century, Carmine
- Zeorymer, Masato Akitsu/Masaki Kihara

1989

- Angel Cop, Tachihara

1990

- Madö King Granzört The Last Magical War, Grunwald

1991

- Here is Greenwood, Shinobu Tezuka

1992

- Ai no Kusabi, Riki
- Bastard!!, Lord Kall-Su

1993

- Please Save My Earth, Mikuro Yakushimaru

1994

- Tenshi Nanka Ja Nai, Bunta Kouno
- Wild 7, Dairoku Hiba

1995

- Black Jack, Umetani Tokio
- Bio Hunter, Komada

1996

- Seikimatsu Darling, Todoroki Kouhei

1997

- Twilight of the Dark Master, Tsunami Shijo

1998

- Blue Submarine 6, Katsuma Nonaka

1999

- Pet Shop of Horrors, Count D

2002

- Saint Seiya: Hades, Scorpio Milo

2004

- Mirage of Blaze: Rebels of the River Edge, Takaya Ougi

2007

- Saiyuki Reload: Burial, Genjo Sanzo

2009

- Dogs: Bullets & Carnage, Bishop
- Saint Seiya: The Lost Canvas, Pope Sage

2011

- Saiyuki Gaiden, Konzen Douji

2013

- Saiyuki Gaiden: Kouga no Shou, Konzen Douji

2015

- Mobile Suit Gundam: The Origin, Char Aznable

Unsorted

- Future GPX Cyber Formula series (Bleed Kaga)

=== Original net animation ===
- Sword Gai: The Animation (2018), Takuma Miura
- Pluto (2023), Pluto
- Onimusha (2023), Kojiro Sasaki

=== Anime films ===
- Touch 3: Don't Pass Me By (1987), Nakajima
- Ryokunohara Labyrinth: Sparkling Phantom (1990), Hiroki Imanishi
- Ninja Scroll (1993), Yurimaru
- Ocean Waves (1993), Yutaka Matsuno
- Dorami-chan: A Blue Straw Hat (1994), Crow
- Nintama Rantarō the Movie (1996), Hansuke Doi
- Violinist of Hameln the Movie (1996), Raiel
- X (1996), Shōgo Asagi
- Saiyuki: Requiem (2001), Genjo Sanzo
- Nintama Rantarō the Movie: Ninjutsu Gakuen Zenin Shutsudō! no Dan (2011), Hansuke Doi
- Detective Conan: Quarter of Silence (2011), Shōgo Hikawa
- Road to Ninja: Naruto the Movie (2012), Iruka Umino
- A Certain Magical Index: The Movie – The Miracle of Endymion (2013), Aleister Crowley
- The Last: Naruto the Movie (2014), Iruka Umino
- Black Clover: Sword of the Wizard King (2023), Konrad Leto
- Birth of Kitarō: The Mystery of GeGeGe (2023), Kitaro's father
- Nintama Rantarō: Invincible Master of the Dokutake Ninja (2024), Tenki, Hansuke Doi

=== Video games ===
- A Certain Magical Index: Imaginary Fest (Aleister Crowley)
- Another Century's Episode 2 (Duo Maxwell)
- Aisle Lord (Rōru)
- Bayonetta 3 (Dr. Sigurd, Singularity)
- Bayonetta Origins: Cereza and the Lost Demon (Singularity)
- Bleach: Heat the Soul 5 (Aaroniero Arruruerie (Kaien Shiba))
- Call of Duty: Advanced Warfare (Joker) (Japanese dub)
- Castlevania: Order of Ecclesia (Albus)
- Demon Slayer: Kimetsu no Yaiba – The Hinokami Chronicles (Muzan Kibutsuji)
- Dissidia: Final Fantasy, Dissidia 012 Final Fantasy, Dissidia Final Fantasy NT and Dissidia Duellum Final Fantasy (Warrior of Light)
- Dynasty Warriors: Gundam 3 (Duo Maxwell)
- Dynasty Warriors: Gundam Reborn (Duo Maxwell, Rau Le Creuset, Rey Za Burrel)
- Everybody's Golf 5 (Johnson (L.J.))
- Fate/Grand Order (Antonio Salieri)
- Future GPX Cyber Formula series (Bleed Kaga)
- Grand Sphere (Luhmer)
- Kamen Rider: Climax Heroes series (Kamen Rider Den-O Sword Form, Kamen Rider Den-O Super Climax Form)
- La Pucelle: Tactics (Croix)
- Naruto games (Iruka Umino)
- Onmyoji (Inugami)
- Project X Zone (Kogroro Tenzai)
- Ray Tracers (Jalta Lang)
- Saint Seiya: Soldiers' Soul (Scorpio Milo, Alioth Epsilon Fenrir)
- Saiyuki Reload and Saiyuki Reload Gunlock (Genjo Sanzo)
- SD Gundam G Generation 3D (Duo Maxwell, Rau Le Creuset, Rey Za Burrel)
- SD Gundam G Generation World (Def Stallion, Duo Maxwell, Rau Le Creuset, Rey Za Burrel)
- Super Robot Wars series (Duo Maxwell, Perfectio, Rau Le Creuset, Rey Za Burrel, Masato Akitsu/Masaki Kihara, Embryo, Tetsuya Tsurugi (INFINITY))
- Samurai Deeper Kyô (Benitora)
- Stranger of Paradise: Final Fantasy Origin (Warrior of Light)
- Super Monkey Ball Banana Mania (Doctor, Jet)
- Tales of Destiny 2 (Loni Dunamis)
- The Evil Within (Ruvik)
- Virtua Fighter 4: Evolution (Goh Hinogami)
- Virtua Fighter 5 (Goh Hinogami)
- World of Final Fantasy (Warrior of Light)
- Cookie Run Kingdom (Red Velvet Cookie)
- Touken Ranbu (Ichimonji Norimune)
- Genshin Impact (Dottore)
- Arknights (Chong Yue)

=== Tokusatsu ===
- Ultraman: Super Fighter Legend (1996) – (Ultraseven, Ultraman Leo)
- Denji Sentai Megaranger (1997) – (Chameleon Nejire) (Ep. 4)
- Kamen Rider Den-O (2007) – (Momotaros/Kamen Rider Den-O Sword Form)
- Kamen Rider Kiva: King of the Castle in the Demon World (2008) – (Penitentiary Officer Sanjō/Zebra Fangire)
- Super Space Sheriff Gavan Infinity (2026) – (Cosmo Gavarion/Gavarion Trigger/Supreme Chancellor)
- Kakusei Hunter Omegahorn (2026) – (Cosmo Gavarion/Gavarion Trigger) (Ep. 5, 14)

=== Live-action ===
- The Promised Neverland (2020) (Demon's voice)

=== Dubbing roles ===
==== Live-action ====
- Ben Mendelsohn
  - Robin Hood – Sheriff of Nottingham
  - Captain Marvel – Talos
  - Spider-Man: Far From Home – Talos
  - Secret Invasion – Talos
- 13 Going on 30 – Matt Flamhaff (Mark Ruffalo)
- Alive – Antonio "Tintin" Vizintin (John Newton)
- Backdraft – Probationary Firefighter Brian McCaffrey (William Baldwin)
- Beetlejuice Beetlejuice – Father Damien (Burn Gorman)
- Copycat (1998 TV Tokyo edition) – Inspector Reuben Goetz (Dermot Mulroney)
- Cutthroat Island – William Shaw (Matthew Modine)
- Doctor Who – Tenth Doctor, Fourteenth Doctor (David Tennant)
- Edward Scissorhands (1994 TV Asahi edition) – Edward Scissorhands (Johnny Depp)
- Fly Me to the Moon – Lance Vespertine (Jim Rash)
- The Godfather Part III – Vincent Corleone (Andy García)
- A Good Day to Die Hard – Alik (Radivoje Bukvić)
- Good Omens – Crowley (David Tennant)
- Gremlins – Billy Peltzer (Zach Galligan)
- Gremlins 2: The New Batch – Billy Peltzer (Zach Galligan)
- Hocus Pocus – Thackery Binx (Sean Murray)
- Hollywoodland – George Reeves (Ben Affleck)
- Idiocracy – Joe Bauers (Luke Wilson)
- Legend – Jack (Tom Cruise)
- Oldboy – Lee Woo-jin (Yoo Ji-tae)
- The Pianist – Henryk Szpilman (Ed Stoppard)
- Reality Bites – Troy Dyer (Ethan Hawke)
- Roman Holiday (2022 NTV edition) – Mario Delani (Paolo Carlini)
- Rough Magic – Cliff Wyatt (D. W. Moffett)
- The Secret Life of Walter Mitty – Don Proctor (Paul Fitzgerald)
- Sliver – Zeke Hawkins (William Baldwin)
- Summer of Sam – Ritchie (Adrien Brody)
- The Temp – Peter Derns (Timothy Hutton)
- Tomcats – Michael Delaney (Jerry O'Connell)
- Valerian and the City of a Thousand Planets – General Okto Bar (Sam Spruell)
- Village of the Damned – Reverend George (Mark Hamill)
- West Side Story (1990 TBS edition) – Chino Martin (Jose De Vega)

== Awards ==
| Year | Award | Category | Result | Ref. |
|---|---|---|---|---|
| 2021 | 15th Seiyu Awards | Kei Tomiyama Memorial Award | Won | |
| 2025 | 19th Seiyu Awards | Best Actors in a Leading Role | Won | |
