= Alex Fernandez (actor) =

American actor

- Occupation: Actor
- Years active: 1985–present

Alexander "Alex" Fernandez is an American actor who is known primarily for his work on television, most notably as National Security Advisor Anthony Prado on Commander in Chief, Rafael "Rafi" Alvarez on Without a Trace, Roy Vickers on Dallas, and Pablo Diaz on Devious Maids. He was also a series regular on ABC's short-lived crime drama Killer Women, playing the role of Luis Zea. He also had a small role in Mayans M.C. as Diaz.

== Career ==
He has made guest appearances on such series as House, The Closer, NCIS: Los Angeles, Army Wives, Prison Break, CSI: Miami, Cold Case, Heroes, The West Wing, The Good Wife , The Shield and Devious Maids, Off the Map, among many others. He is also noted for his voiceover work in video games, especially as antagonist Maester Seymour Guado in Final Fantasy X, Mangus in Brütal Legend, Carlito Keyes in Dead Rising, and as Uka Uka in Crash Twinsanity, taking over the role from actor Clancy Brown. He was also the original voice of The Chief in the classic game Where in the World Is Carmen Sandiego?. He has also had roles in other video games, including Saints Row and Saints Row 2, James Bond 007: Everything or Nothing, Quantum of Solace, Splinter Cell: Double Agent, and Mercenaries 2: World in Flames, Brütal Legend. He has also voiced numerous characters in animation, including the films Tekkonkinkreet, Gen^{13}, Vampire Hunter D and The Animatrix, and the series Family Guy, American Dad!, Spawn, Petshop of Horrors, and Ninja Scroll: The Series.

He appeared in Body of Proof episode "Hunting Party". In 2016, he appeared in two episodes of the Fox Network series Lucifer as Warden Perry Smith.

In 2017 he played the role of Sergeant Daniel Vega in "Genetics" the 11th episode of the 7the season of the CBS police procedural drama Blue Bloods.

== Filmography ==
=== Film ===
Year	Title	Role	Notes
2001	Vampire Hunter D: Bloodlust	Kyle (voice)	
2003	The Animatrix	Tom (voice)	World Record segment
2006	Tekkonkinkreet	Choco (voice)	
2012	The Man Who Shook the Hand of Vicente Fernandez	Bandito / Paramedic	
2016	Stevie D	Mayor Arturo Lopez	
2017	Christmas Crime Story	Detective Ambrozik	
2020	Last Moment of Clarity	Bill Rice	

=== Television ===
Year	Title	Role	Notes
1995	Æon Flux	Aemon (voice)	2 episodes
1996	The Burning Zone	Guard	Episode: "Hall of the Serpent"
1997	Pacific Palisades	Orderly	Episode: "Motherly Love"
1997	Spicy City	Armando "Mano" Mantio (voice)	Episode: "Mano's Hands"
1997–99	Todd McFarlane's Spawn	Additional Voices	6 episodes
1998–99	Melrose Place	Ed Carson	2 episodes
1999	JAG	Joe Epps	Episode: "Front and Center"
1999	Pet Shop of Horrors	Leon Orcot (voice)	4 episodes
2002	Robbery Homicide Division	Brad Bocce	Episode: "2028 (a.k.a. Internet Sex)"
2002	The Guardian	Doug Debord	Episode: "No Good Deed"
2003	Kingpin	Rosales	Episode: "Gimme Shelter"
2003	The Handler	Trooper Smith	Episode: "Street Boss"
2003	Joan of Arcadia	Sgt. Bob Crowley	Episode: "The Boat"
2004, 2005	Without a Trace	Rafael Alvarez	2 episodes
2005	The Shield	Bob Mamyn	2 episodes
2005	E-Ring	José Aguilar	2 episodes
2005	The West Wing	Andy Lazon	Episode: "Ninety Miles Away"
2005	Wanted	Max Rubio	Episode: "Ronin"
2005	Night Stalker	Gary Reynolds	Episode: "Burning Man"
2005–06	Commander in Chief	Anthony Prado	Recurring role; 5 episodes
2006	Charmed	Lt. Sanchez	Episode: "Payback's a Witch"
2006	CSI: Miami	Victor Terraza	Episode: "Deviant"
2006	Cold Case	Father Peralta	Episode: "Sanctuary"
2006–07	Shark	Norman Saunders	2 episodes
2006–07	The Nine	The Mayor	2 episodes
2007	Viva Laughlin	Ernesto Navarro	Episode: "Fighter"
2007	Moonlight	Victor	Unaired pilot
2007	Heroes	Police Captain Baldwin	Episode: "The Fix"
2007	Prison Break	Captain Hurtado	3 episodes
2007	Family Guy	Gerardo / Various Mexican Guys (voice)	Episode: "Padre de Familia"
2008	Medium	Martin Gibbons	Episode: "Being Joey Carmichael"
2008	The Closer	ATF Agent Mara	Episode: "Sudden Death"
2008	Army Wives	Paolo Ruiz	2 episodes
2009	House	Fernando	Episode: "Painless"
2009	American Dad!	Charles / Gardner (voice)	Episode: "Roy Rogers McFreely"
2009	Raising the Bar	P.O. Alan Garcia	Episode: "Fine and Dandy"
2009	NCIS: Los Angeles	Luis Perez	Episode: "Identity"
2010	Human Target	Peter Blanchard	Episode: "Embassy Row"
2010	The Good Guys	Romero	Episode: "Pilot"
2010	Chuck	Juan Pablo Turrini	Episode: "Chuck Versus the Coup d'Etat"
2010	Undercovers	Presidente Alberto Loya	Episode: "Assassin"
2010	Criminal Minds	Det. Felix Ruiz	Episode: "What Happens at Home..."
2011	Off the Map	Guillermo Mendez	2 episodes
2011	NCIS	Joseph Flores	2 episodes
2011	Desperate Housewives	Detective Hank Powell	Episode: "And Lots of Security..."
2011	Rizzoli & Isles	Officer Ronald Duncan	Episode: "Gone Daddy Gone"
2011	Body of Proof	Alan Wright	Episode: "Hunting Party"
2012	The Finder	Federico "Fico" Vasquez	Episode: "The Last Meal"
2012	Modern Family	Park Worker	Episode: "When a Tree Falls"
2013	Dallas	Roy Vickers	Recurring role; 8 episodes
2013	Mistresses	Power Husband	Episode: "Indecent Proposals"
2013	The Bridge	FBI SAC Richard Heller	3 episodes
2013–15	Devious Maids	Pablo Diaz	Recurring role; 9 episodes
2014	Killer Women	Luis Zea	Series regular; 8 episodes
2014	Castle	Captain Marcus Donovan	Episode: "Veritas"
2014	The Last Ship	Ervin Delgado	Episode: "El Toro"
2014	Stalker	Frank Santos	Episode: "Manhunt"
2015	State of Affairs	FBI Agent Mike Hernandez	2 episodes
2015	The Mentalist	Det. Brian Portis	Episode: "Nothing Gold Can Stay"
2015	True Detective	James O'Neal	3 episodes
2015	Madam Secretary	Vice President Mark Delgado	Episode: "The Show Must Go On"
2015	Bones	Umberto Vargas	Episode: "The Donor in the Drink"
2015	NCIS: New Orleans	Hugo Garza	Episode: "Confluence"
2016	Recovery Road	Det. Covino	Episode: "Heaven Backwards"
2016	Dead of Summer	Hector Diaz	Episode: "Mix Tape"
2016	Timeless	General Santa Anna	Episode: "The Alamo"
2016	Lucifer	Deputy Warden Perry Smith	2 episodes
2016–19	Jane the Virgin	Father Gustavo	3 episodes
2017	Blue Bloods	Sgt. Daniel Vega	Episode: "Genetics"
2017	Switched at Birth	Manuel Barahona	Episode: "Four Ages in Life"
2017	The Blacklist: Redemption	Diego Rocha	Episode: "Hostages"
2017–18	Runaways	Detective Flores	6 episodes
2017–18	Grey's Anatomy	FBI Agent Heyward	2 episodes
2018	The Assassination of Gianni Versace: American Crime Story	Matt L. Rodriguez	Episode: "A Random Killing"
2018	Code Black	Dr. Oscar Avila	2 episodes
2019	The OA	Det. Rob Blindheim	3 episodes
2019–23	Good Trouble	Hugo Martinez	7 episodes
2021–23	Mayans M.C.	Diaz	7 episodes
2022	Westworld	Mr. Mora	Episode: "The Auguries"
2022	American Gigolo	Panish	8 episodes
2022–23	Big Sky	Winston Turner	3 episodes
2022–24	SEAL Team	Admiral Rivas	5 episodes
2023	True Lies	Lance Dale	Episode: "Bitter Sweethearts"
2025	Tracker	Otto Waldron	Episode: "Echo Ridge"
2025	Doc	Alex Cruz	Episode: "Her Heart"

=== Video games ===
Year	Title	Voice role	Notes	Source
1985	Where in the World is Carmen Sandiego?	The Chief		
1996	Top Gun: Fire At Will	Additional Voices		
2001	Final Fantasy X	Seymour Guado		
2003	Final Fantasy X-2	Maester Seymour Guado	Flashback	
2003	James Bond 007: Everything or Nothing	The General		
2004	Crash Twinsanity	Uka Uka, Farmer Ernest		
2004	EverQuest II	Undead Male Gnoll, Generic Male Gnoll		
2006	Baten Kaitos Origins	Bein		
2006	Dead Rising	Carlito Keyes		
2006	Saints Row	Stilwater's Resident		
2006	Just Cause	Generic Voices		
2006	Syphon Filter: Dark Mirror	Additional Voices		
2006	Splinter Cell: Double Agent	Additional Voices		
2008	Saints Row 2	Additional Voices		
2008	Quantum of Solace	General Medrano, South American Mercenaries		
2008	Mercenaries 2: World in Flames	Diaz - Venezuelan Civilian		
2009	Indiana Jones and the Staff of Kings	Pillagers		
2009	Brütal Legend	Mangus, Air Corpse		
2009	Final Fantasy XIII	Cocoon Inhabitants		
2010	MAG	Valor Commander		
2010	Call of Duty: Black Ops	Additional Voices		
2011	Driver: San Francisco	Additional Voices		
2011	Star Wars: The Old Republic	Additional Voices		
2011	SOCOM 4: U.S. Navy SEALs	ClawHammer Soldier 4		
2011	F.E.A.R. 3	Various		
2016	ReCore	Victor, Julius Roldan		
2018–19	The Walking Dead: The Final Season	Abel		
2021	Far Cry 6	Juan Cortez		
