= Pet Shop of Horrors =

Japanese manga series and its adaptations

- First tankōbon volume cover
- Genre: Horror fantasy; Mystery
- Manga
- Written by: Matsuri Akino
- Published by: Ohzora Publishing; Bunkasha
- English publisher: AUS: Madman Entertainment; NA: Tokyopop (former); Seven Seas Entertainment; UK: Tokyopop
- Imprint: Missy Comics DX
- Magazine: Apple Mystery (1994–1998); Horror M (1998)
- Original run: 1994 – 1998
- Volumes: 10
- Anime television series
- Directed by: Toshio Hirata
- Written by: Yasuhiro Imagawa
- Music by: Kazuhisa Yamaguchi
- Studio: Madhouse
- Licensed by: AUS: Madman Entertainment; NA: Sentai Filmworks; UK: MVM Films
- Original network: TBS
- Original run: March 2, 1999 – March 23, 1999
- Episodes: 4
- Manga

Pet Shop of Horrors: Tokyo
- Written by: Matsuri Akino
- Published by: Asahi Sonorama (former); Asahi Shimbun Publications
- English publisher: NA: Tokyopop
- Magazine: Mungekan (2004–2009); Horror & Fantasy Club (2009–2012)
- Original run: April 22, 2004 – November 15, 2012
- Volumes: 12
- Manga

Petshop of Horrors: Passage-hen
- Written by: Matsuri Akino
- Published by: Harlequin
- Magazine: Mugentō (2013); Harlequin Original (2015–2017)
- Original run: March 23, 2013 – May 11, 2017
- Volumes: 5
- Manga

Petshop of Horrors: Hyōhaku no Hakobune-hen
- Written by: Matsuri Akino
- Published by: Harlequin
- Magazine: Harlequin Original
- Original run: September 11, 2018 – March 11, 2020
- Volumes: 3
- icon

Pet Shop of Horrors (Note: Petshop of Horrors in the original Japanese release.) is a Japanese manga series written and illustrated by Matsuri Akino. It was serialized in Ohzora Publishing's Apple Mystery, and later in Bunkasha's Horror M from 1994 to 1998, with its chapters collected in ten tankōbon volumes. The series focuses on the eccentric Count D, proprietor of a mysterious pet shop located in the heart of Chinatown, and the numerous patrons who visit his supernatural shop. The series was licensed in North America by Tokyopop.

A four-episode anime television series produced by Madhouse was broadcast in 1999. A second manga series, titled Pet Shop of Horrors: Tokyo (known as New Petshop of Horrors in Japan) was serialized by Asahi Sonorama (and later Asahi Shimbun Publications) in Mungekan from 2004 to 2009, and later published as a webcomic on Yahoo! Comics's Horror & Fantasy Club site from 2009 to 2012. Its chapters were collected in twelve volumes. The manga was also licensed in North America by Tokyopop, who only released eight volume from 2008 to 2011.

A spin-off series, titled Pet Shop of Horrors: Passage-hen, which follows Count D's grandfather in Fin de siècle Paris, was irregularly published in HarperCollins Japan's Mugentō (2013) and Harlequin Original (2015–2017); five volumes were released. Another spin-off, titled Petshop of Horrors: Hyōhaku no Hakobune-hen, featuring Count D's father as the protagonist, was serialized in Harlequin Original from 2018 to 2020, with its chapters collected in three volumes.

== Plot ==
"Count D" is the mysterious caretaker of a pet shop in Los Angeles Chinatown. Each of D's rare pets, which all have strangely humanoid appearances, comes with a contract with three major points. These points differ for each animal sold (although each animal's contract includes not showing it to anyone), and breaking this contract usually results in dire (and sometimes disturbing) consequences for the buyer, for which the pet shop claims no liability.

Individual chapters of Pet Shop of Horrors are often based on these consequences, and are each written as a stand-alone story, usually introducing one or more new characters in each chapter. With the exception of the main characters and their families, it is rare for a character to carry over to a later chapter, providing the series with a very episodic nature.

The detective Leon Orcot is used to tie the chapters together into an ongoing plot, usually in the form of a subplot within each chapter. Initially he suspects D of malicious criminal activity and using the pet shop as a front for drug trafficking. As the series progresses, he learns more about the pet shop and D himself, entering into a strange friendship of sorts with D as he works to uncover the truth.

== Characters ==
=== Main characters ===
Count D
Voiced by: Toshihiko Seki (Japanese); John DeMita (English)
He manages a pet shop in Chinatown in his grandfather's absence, though he rejects the name "Count D", reserving it for the shop's true owner. Claiming to trade in "love, dreams, and hope" rather than pets, he favors animals over humans, displaying a serene demeanor—except around Leon, whom he tolerates despite frequent clashes. Though he professes disdain for humanity, he grows attached to Chris and reluctantly accepts Leon's bribes of sweets. His father reveals they descend from an ancient civilization linked to animals, nearly wiped out after a refused marriage proposal. D and his family are near-identical clones—distinguished only by eye color—created to continue their ancestor's vengeance.
Leon Orcot (レオン・オルコット, Reon Orukotto)
Voiced by: Masaya Onosaka (Japanese); Alex Fernandez (English)
Leon Orcot, a brash detective, obsessively investigates D's pet shop, linking it to local deaths. Convinced D is a criminal, he vows to arrest him, refusing to accept supernatural explanations despite mounting evidence. Though initially hostile, their relationship grows complex over time. Leon's womanizing habits frequently surface, contrasting his otherwise determined demeanor. Unlike other customers who suffer consequences, Leon receives two benevolent pets from D—a flowering plant and a butterfly—both offering solace during his struggles. These gifts mark a subtle shift in their dynamic, diverging from D's usual dealings.

=== Other humans ===
Chris Orcot (クリス・オルコット, Kurisu Orukotto)
Chris, Leon's younger brother, lost his mother in childbirth and was raised by relatives. After his cousin blamed him for her death, he became mute. Sent to live with Leon in Los Angeles, he frequently visits D's pet shop, where he communicates telepathically with D, Leon, and the animals—all of whom he perceives in human form, believing D sells willing children. Only Q-chan appears as an animal to him. After reconciling with his cousin, he regains his speech but loses his ability to see the animals' humanoid forms. Twenty years later, as an FBI agent, he seeks the new Count not as an adversary but to inquire about Leon's disappearance.
Jill (ジル, Jiru)
Voiced by: Satsuki Yukino (Japanese); Julia DeMita (English)
Jill, Leon's police colleague, serves as his more competent counterpart – demonstrating greater knowledge and professionalism. Fluent in Chinese and well-versed in subjects like butterfly life cycles, she frequently counters Leon's accusations against D with reason. While maintaining her duties as an officer, she shows clear appreciation for D's company and regularly finds herself frustrated by Leon's obsessive suspicions.
Samantha (サマンサ, Samansa)
Commonly known as "Sam", she is Chris's younger cousin. She, initially resented him for ruining her bunny doll when he joined her household at age four. After her harsh words drove him away, she regretted her actions. With Ten-chan's help, they eventually reconcile, and she begins affectionately calling Chris her "brother", showing genuine remorse for her childhood behavior.

=== Animals ===
T-chan (テっちゃん, Te-chan)
T-chan is a totetsu, a mythical carnivorous creature distantly related to goats. Originally a chef at D's favorite restaurant, their unusual relationship developed – D coveted him as a rare specimen, while T-chan desired to devour the vegetarian D. After being arrested during an attempt to eat D, he transformed by consuming his own heart. To most, he appears as a small goat-like creature with tiger-striped paws, but Chris and D see him as a horned, temperamental young man in Middle Eastern-style clothing. Quick-tempered and childish, he frequently antagonizes Leon, often trying to bite him during visits.
Ponta (ポンタ) / Pon-chan
Pon-chan, a raccoon residing at D's pet shop, appears as an ordinary animal to most but takes human form as a blond-haired girl in Victorian dress to D and Chris. Fond of Chris, she displays affectionate jealousy when he interacts with other girls, contrasting with T-chan's rougher personality.
Ten-chan (天ちゃん)
Ten-chan, a shape-shifting nine-tailed fox, appears differently to each observer—sometimes as multiple forms simultaneously. While most see a small white fox, D and Chris perceive an androgynous youth with braided hair and flamboyant style. His speech is crude and manner relaxed, with abilities extending to personality mimicry and occult powers. A master of illusion, he effortlessly embodies whatever form suits his purpose.
Honlon (紅竜, Honron)
A three-headed dragon that appears as a young girl in traditional Asian clothing, with each head manifesting distinct personalities: responsible Shuko (raised by D), violent Kanan (influenced by Leon), and childish Junrei (shaped by a young boy). Born decades apart, the siblings often clash—Kanan particularly enjoys bullying Junrei. Like Pon-chan, they grow attached to Chris after he forms a contract with them, displaying mild jealousy when he interacts with others. Their fragmented nature stems from absorbing the traits of whoever last held their eggs before hatching.

=== D's family ===
D's father (Dの父, D no Chichi)
D's father remains unnamed, bearing striking resemblance to his son but with longer hair and matching purple eyes. Harboring deep resentment toward humanity for environmental destruction, he displays manipulative tendencies that even D distrusts. In 1975, he posed as a Hong Kong exchange student, conducting genetic research where he encountered Vesca Howell. The FBI agent dedicated his career to arresting him, mirroring Leon's pursuit of D. Their conflict ended violently—Leon wounded D's father, who then killed Howell. Ultimately reborn as a human, he is taken by D's grandfather to be raised anew, continuing the family's enigmatic legacy.
Q-chan (Qちゃん) / D's grandfather
Voiced by: (Japanese); Sandee Yamamoto (English)
Q-chan, a bat-like creature, serves as D's constant companion and is uniquely perceived as an animal by all observers. Later revealed to be D's grandfather and the true "Count D", he explains in the sequel that the title originated with his own grandfather and now simply represents the shop's name. After the series concludes, Q-chan resumes his humanoid form—identical to D but with golden eyes—and assumes responsibility for raising the reborn D's father, continuing the family lineage.
New D (もう一人のD, Mōhitori no D)
In the series' conclusion, an unnamed Chinese man inherits the pet shop. Twenty years after Papa D's death, he meets adult Chris Orcot—now an FBI agent—and, maintaining his family's tradition, accepts cherry tarts as an invitation to converse. His appearance suggests the shop's legacy continues through another generation.

== Media ==
=== Manga ===
Written and illustrated by Matsuri Akino, Pet Shop of Horrors was serialized in Ohzora Publishing's Apple Mystery (November 1994 to July 1998 issues), and later in Bunkasha's Horror M (in 1998). Ohzora Publishing released ten tankōbon volumes, under the Missy Comics DX imprint, from March 1995 to September 1998. Bunkasha later released the series in four volumes from February 24 to March 29, 1999.

In North America, the manga was licensed for English release by Tokyopop. The ten volumes were released from June 17, 2003, to January 11, 2005. In August 2024, Seven Seas Entertainment announced that it had licensed the series and it will be released in a collector's edition with an all-new translation starting in February 2025. It was distributed in New Zealand and Australia by Madman Entertainment.

==== Other series ====
A second series, titled Pet Shop of Horrors: Tokyo, known in Japan as New Pet Shop of Horrors (新 Petshop of Horrors, Shin Petshop of Horrors), started in Asahi Sonorama's Mugenkan on April 22, 2004. (Note: It started in the magazine's debut issue, released on April 22, 2004.) In June 2007, the company announced that it would cease operations, and the magazine went on to be published by Asahi Shimbun Publications, until it last issue released on April 23, 2009, and the series continued as a webcomic on Yahoo! Comics's Horror & Fantasy Club site on August 20 of that same year. The series finished on November 15, 2012. Asahi Sonorama released four volumes from January 2005 to April 2007; Asahi Shimbun Publications republished the four volumes on November 26, 2007, and released the twelfth and last volume on February 7, 2013. In North America, Tokyopop published eight volumes from February 28, 2008, to February 1, 2011.

A spin-off series, titled Petshop of Horrors: Passage-hen (Petshop of Horrors パサージュ編), started in HarperCollins Japan's Mugentō on March 23, 2013. It is set in late 19th century France, and the protagonist is the grandfather of Count D, who runs a pet shop in a shopping arcade called a Passage in French. The series moved to Harlequin Original in February 2015; its latest chapter released on May 11, 2017. Five volumes were published by HarperCollins Japan from August 24, 2013, to June 24, 2017.

Another spin-off series, titled Petshop of Horrors: Hyōhaku no Hakobune-hen (Petshop of Horrors 漂泊の箱舟編; lit. 'Pet Shop of Horrors: Ark Adrift'), was published in Harlequin Original from September 11, 2018, to March 11, 2020. It features Count D's father as the protagonist. Three volumes were released from December 27, 2018, to May 18, 2020.

=== Anime ===
Madhouse produced a 4-episode anime adaptation of various chapters of the manga in March 1999. The anime first aired as a miniseries on the TBS television network (as part of their now-defunct programming block "Wonderful") before being sold on VHS and LaserDisc.

Urban Vision released the Pet Shop of Horrors anime in North America, initially across two VHS tapes (each available in either subtitled or dubbed format) in February and May 2000 respectively. It was then re-released on a single DVD video (containing all four episodes and both language options) in February 2001. Sentai Filmworks had acquired the license in October 2008, with distribution by ADV Films. However, in 2009, A.D. Vision announced that it has shut down ADV Films and distribution rights were transferred to Section23 Films, who continues to distribute titles from Sentai. It would eventually be released on DVD as a "Sentai Selects" title on January 5, 2016. In the UK, It got its DVD release via MVM on August 2, 2010.

==== Episodes ====
No.	Title	Original release date
1	"Daughter"	March 2, 1999
A rich couple has lost their only daughter, Alice. Fortunately, Count D is able to acquire a very rare species of rabbit that looks exactly like Alice. The couple is overjoyed and immediately takes the rabbit home. But their love for Alice makes them breach one of the contract's terms.
2	"Delicious"	March 9, 1999
The popular idol singer Evangeline Blue and her manager Jason are about to be wed on a luxury ship when Evangeline "accidentally" falls overboard, her body never to be found. The heartbroken Jason travels to Count D's to pick up a pet that Eva had supposedly ordered. But to his surprise, the pet turns out to be a very large rare species of a fish but looks (to him at least) like a mermaid who looks exactly like Eva.
3	"Despair"	March 16, 1999
Actor Robin Hendrix was a one-hit wonder. After the phenomenal success of his debut movie, Robin couldn't get any more acting jobs. It seemed he'd been stereotyped by the very role that made him famous. To top it off, his wife has left him. Robin loves keeping pet reptiles, and so he goes to Count D's to pick up an additional pet to cheer himself up. But Count D has something special for Robin: a very rare species of reptile known as Medusa for its lethal stare, with the face and upper body of a beautiful woman, but the lower half of a large lizard.
4	"Dual"	March 23, 1999
Roger Stanford comes from a long line of successful politicians, but is considered the bad apple of the family due to his carefree and womanising ways. His faithful assistant, Kelly Vincent, is determined to make Roger the president of the United States, even if it means making a pact with the legendary animal called the Kirin, who grants the wish of its sovereign through the blood of others. Count D just happens to have one Kirin in stock.

== Reception ==
Carlo Santos of Anime News Network described the plot of Pet Shop of Horrors: Tokyo as "the series' greatest strength but also its weakness: the plot formula makes it easy to dish out just the right amount of human drama, but those familiar with the Pet Shop will see each twist coming—and may even find some of them to be too far-fetched." Santos also felt that the art was "not particularly horrifying," commenting that "it's clear that Akino struggles with any artwork beyond the usual range of attractive young men, fashionable women and the occasional bizarre creature." However, he commended the "well-planned" layout and pacing of the volume. Robin Brenner commented that "Pet Shop of Horrors has always been more about atmosphere than about truly surprising plots... Instead, the pleasure comes from Matsuri Akino's talent for truthful dialogue, attention to detail in the art, and a fine sense of how to portray both laughter and dread."
