= Julia Fletcher =

American voice actress

- Other names: Julia DeMita
- Occupation: Voice actress
- Years active: 1981–present
- Spouse: John DeMita
- Children: 2, including Elliot Fletcher
- Relatives: Jack Fletcher (brother)

Julia Fletcher, sometimes credited as Julia DeMita, is an American voice actress. Among her roles are the Instructor (narrator) in The Second Renaissance, Elma and Yunalesca in Final Fantasy X, Carmila in Vampire Hunter D: Bloodlust, Scaphandra and Judy in Æon Flux, Olmpias in the first four episodes of Reign: The Conqueror, and Orphan in Final Fantasy XIII. She is married to voice actor John DeMita.

== Dubbing roles ==
=== Anime ===
- Dragon Slayer – Princess
- Final Fantasy: Legend of the Crystals – Mid
- Golgo 13: Queen Bee – Nursemaid
- Kiki's Delivery Service – Ket's Aunt, Ket's Mother (Disney version)
- Naruto – Haruna
- Ninja Scroll – Nekome, Azami, Utsushiei
- Pet Shop of Horrors – Jill, Mrs. Hayworth
- Psycho Diver: Soul Siren – Kyoko Ayuhara
- Reign: The Conqueror – Olympias
- Tekkaman Blade II – Aki Kisaragi, Dead-End
- Tenchi Muyo! – Nagi (Tenchi Universe)
- The Animatrix - The Second Renaissance – The Instructor
- Twilight of the Dark Master – Chan Long
- Vampire Hunter D: Bloodlust – Carmilla
- Vampire Princess Miyu – Maiko Yanagihara, Mrs. Oshima, Narrator

=== Video games ===
- Final Fantasy X – Lady Yunalesca, Elma
- Final Fantasy X-2 – Elma
- Final Fantasy XII – Judge Drace
- Final Fantasy XIII – Orphan (Shell form, female half)
- Project Sylpheed – Doris Egan
- Valkyria Chronicles – Eleanor Varrot
- Valkyria Chronicles II – Eleanor Varrot, Rene Randall

== Filmography ==
=== Animation ===
- Æon Flux – Scraphandra, Judy, Additional voices
- The Chronicles of Riddick: Dark Fury – Merc Squad Leader

== Awards and nominations ==
Ovation Awards

- 2009: Nominated for Lead Actress in a Play for the role of Anna in the Andak Stage Company production of "The Letters"
