= Vampire Hunter D (disambiguation) =

Vampire Hunter D is a novel series by Hideyuki Kikuchi and Yoshitaka Amano, the title character of the novel series, and a related media franchise.

Vampire Hunter D may also refer to:

- Vampire Hunter D (novel), the 1983 first novel in the series
- Vampire Hunter D (1985 film), a 1985 animated film based on the 1983 novel
  - Vampire Hunter D (soundtrack), a soundtrack album for the 1985 film
- Vampire Hunter D (video game), a 1999 video game based on the novel and film series
- Vampire Hunter D: Bloodlust, a 2000 animated film based on the third novel in the series, Demon Deathchase
- Hideyuki Kikuchi's Vampire Hunter D, a manga series based on the novel series
- Vampire Hunter D: American Wasteland, a comic book miniseries based on the novel series
