= Vampire Hunter D 1 =

Vampire Hunter D 1 may refer to:

- Vampire Hunter D Volume 1 (novel), the first novel
- Vampire Hunter D (1985 film), the first film
- Hideyuki Kikuchi's Vampire Hunter D Volume 1 (manga), the first manga volume
