= Vampire Hunter D 2 =

Vampire Hunter D 2 may refer to:

- Vampire Hunter D: Raiser of Gales, the second novel
- Vampire Hunter D: Bloodlust, the second film
- Hideyuki Kikuchi's Vampire Hunter D Volume 2 (manga), the second manga volume
