= Enoki Films =

Anime production company

- Industry: Film, Anime
- Founded: 1975; 1980 (London, England); 1986 (Enoki Films USA)
- Defunct: 2010 (Enoki Films USA)
- Headquarters: Shinjuku, Tokyo
- Key people: Zen & Yoshi Enoki
- Website: enoki-films.co.jp

Enoki Films Co., Ltd. (エノキフイルム株式会社, Enokifuirumu Kabushiki Kaisha) is a Japanese studio based in the Enoki Building in Shinjuku, Tokyo.

Enoki Films also had a North American division, Enoki Films USA, Inc., established in 1986, and headquartered in the Encino area of Los Angeles, California, United States. Enoki Films USA acted as a middle-man between Japanese companies and American licensees, such as 4Kids Entertainment and Saban. In May 2007, their content was made available as video on demand through the internet startup ReelTime.com (worldwide, except Japan).

As of 2002, Enoki licensed anime but sub-licensed these licenses to various distributors instead of distributing directly. According to Anime News Network, "They generally only license TV shows that they hope to also license to TV broadcasters such as Cartoon Network, ABC Family and Fox Kids".

Some of the anime productions listed on Enoki's website appeared under alternate names, and characters may also have been listed under different names. In many cases, when sub-licensed to anime home video companies, the original titles and character names were restored. Enoki's translations of episode titles and scenarios sometimes differed from those in the official release.

If Enoki's series had a separate movie or direct-to-video production, Enoki usually did not license those. The film or direct-to-video production was often licensed to a separate company, as seen with the Slayers movies and OVAs, and the Utena movie.

Enoki Films' North American division ceased operations in 2010 and is now defunct.

In addition to distributing anime, Enoki Films USA also distributed puppet shows, such as Peppermint Park and Star Fleet.

== History ==
In 1975, Zen and Yoshi Enoki established Enoki Films Co., Ltd. in Tokyo. In 1980, they opened a liaison office in London, England, for European operations. In 1986 the California office opened; soon afterwards Yoshi Enoki opened the American division.

== Anime licensed by Enoki Films USA ==
Some of the Enoki USA titles include:

- 8 Man After
- Bistro Recipe (Fighting Foodons; produced with 4Kids Entertainment)
- Captain Tsubasa (under the titles Flash Kicker and Captain Tsubasa)
- Cosmo Warrior Zero (under the title Cosmowarrior Zero)
- Demon Lord Dante
- El-Hazard: The Wanderer
- Genshi-kun (Flint the Time Detective; produced with Saban)
- Gensomaden Saiyuki under the title Saiyuki: Paradise Raiders)
- Gun Frontier
- Gokudo (as Jester the Adventurer)
- His and Her Circumstances (as Tales at North Hills High; released under original name)
- Honey Honey no Suteki na Bouken (as simply Honey Honey)
- Ikki Tousen
- Lolo the Penguin (Scamper the Penguin)
- Lost Universe
- Majuu Sensen: The Apocalypse (as Beast Fighter: The Apocalypse)
- Revolutionary Girl Utena (as Ursula's Kiss; released under original name)
- Slayers (as The Slayers)
- Totsugeki! Pappara-tai (as The X-treme Team)

== Young anime of Enoki Films ==
- Pokonyan!
- Mojacko
- Prince Mackaroo
- Hello Kitty's Paradise
- Petit Petit Anime
- The Wonderful Galaxy of Oz
- Flint the Time Detective
- Tomatoman
- Kappamaki
- Mock & Sweet
- Hikarian
- Serendipity Stories: Friends of Pure Island
- Serendipity the Pink Dragon
- Dotakon

== Anime available through Enoki Films ==
Enoki also list many other anime series on their website that are available for sub-licensing to other companies for release on home video. As yet, the following titles remain unlicensed by any other company and thus unavailable in English:

- The Adventures of Scamper the Penguin
- Firestorm (Gerry Anderson anime production)
- Forza! Hidemaru (as Forza! Mario)
- Galaxy Gale Baxingar (J-9 series two, as Cosmo Ranger)
- Galaxy Hurricane Sasuraiger (J-9 series three, as Wonder Six)
- Galaxy Whirlwind Braiger (J-9 series one, as Cosmo Runner)
- Giant Killing
- Hikarian
- Mission Outer Space Srungle (as Gorilla Force; previously licensed by Saban as part of "Macron 1" along with GoShogun)
- Ruins Legend Acrobunch
- Submarine Super 99
- Thumbelina
