= Kazuo Komatsubara =

Japanese animator

Kazuo Komatsubara

Kazuo Komatsubara (小松原 一男 or 小松原 一夫, Komatsubara Kazuo; December 24, 1943 – March 24, 2000) was a Japanese animator, animation director and character designer born in Yokohama, Kanagawa Prefecture, Japan. He worked as an independently contracted character designer for Toei Animation in the 1970s and 1980s. He was a member of the board of directors of animation studio Oh! Production (which he helped found along with Norio Shioyama, Kōichi Murata, and Kōshin Yonekawa). He died on March 24, 2000, due to a cancerous tumor on his neck.

== Profile ==
Beginning with Devilman in 1972, Komatsubara moved on to work on other important 1970s anime shows including Getter Robo (1974), Getter Robo G (1975), UFO Robo Grendizer (1975), and Magne Robo Gakeen (1976), working closely with Go Nagai on character designs for many of these shows. For the 1987 OVA remake of the Devilman series, Komatsubara worked as both character designer and animation director. He then caught the animation fandom boom at the end of the 1970s and the beginning of the 1980s as the character designer for the Space Battleship Yamato series, as well as working on the anime TV series Space Pirate Captain Harlock and the anime film Galaxy Express 999. Komatsubara became the most popular anime character designer for Leiji Matsumoto's characters, and many of his illustrations were featured on the front covers of various magazines.

At the same time, Shingo Araki was also a very popular character designer at Toei Animation, though he was beginning to do more work for Tokyo Movie Shinsha. Because of this, Komatsubara began to focus more on his work for Toei Animation. He collaborated with Rintaro on several projects, including the 1980 anime television series Ganbare Genki and the anime film Metropolis (released in 2001, after Komatsubara's death).

When not working on adaptations of the works of Nagai and Matsumoto, Komatsubara worked as character designer on shōjo anime series such as Miracle Shōjo Limit-chan (1973) and Hai! Step Jun (1985). In 1984, he was invited by Hayao Miyazaki to participate in the production of the anime film Nausicaä of the Valley of the Wind, for which he did character designs and acted as animation director. Miyazaki acted as an advisor to Komatsubara during this time, and Komatsubara indicated he learned many things from him as a result of this mentoring.

Komatsubara also created original characters (not based on manga or other references) for the J9 series, including Galactic Whirlwind Braiger, Galactic Gale Baxinger, and Galactic Hurricane Sasuraiger.

== Works ==
Listed alphabetically by year. Credits are for both character design and animation director unless otherwise noted.

- Wolf Boy Ken (1963–1965)
- Osomatsu-kun (1966–1967; animation)
- Tiger Mask (1969–1971; animation director)
- Devilman (1972–1973)
- Microsuperman (1973; Episode Director, Character Design, Animation Director)
- Mazinger Z vs. Devilman (1973)
- Miracle Girl Limit-chan (1973–1974; Character Design)
- Cutie Honey (1973–1974; animation director on two episodes)
- Getter Robo (1974–1975; Character Design)
- Great Mazinger vs. Getter Robo (1975; animation director)
- Getter Robo G (1975–1976; Character Design)
- Great Mazinger vs. Getter Robo G: Kuchu Daigekitotsu (1975; Chief Animation Director)
- Grendizer (1975–1977; Character Design)
- UFO Robot Grendizer vs. Great Mazinger (1976)
- Gaiking (1976–1977)
- Magne Robo Gakeen (1976–1977; Character Design)
- Chojin Sentai Barattack (1977–1978; Character Design)
- Space Pirate Captain Harlock (1978–1979; Character Design)
- Galaxy Express 999 (1978–1981; Animation Director)
- Galaxy Express 999 (film) (1979)
- Adieu Galaxy Express 999 (1981)
- Galaxy Cyclone Braiger (1981–1982; Character Design)
- Galactic Gale Baxingar (1982–1983; Character Design)
- Arcadia of My Youth (1982)
- Arcadia of My Youth: Endless Orbit SSX (1982–1983; Character Design, Animation Director, Chief animator)
- Galactic Whirlwind Sasuraiger (1983–1984; Character Design)
- Nausicaä of the Valley of the Wind (1984)
- Arei no Kagami (1985)
- Maple Town (1986–1987; animation director)
- Freedom Fighter (Laserdisc arcade game based on Galaxy Express 999) (1987; Chief Animator)
- Devilman: Tanjō-hen (1987; Character Design, Key Animation)
- Fair, then Partly Piggy (1988; animation director)
- Devilman: Kaichō Shireinu-hen (1990)
- Junkers Come Here (1995)
