= The Adventures of Lolo the Penguin =

1986 animated film

The Adventures of Lolo the Penguin (USA: Scamper the Penguin)
- English translated Part 1 title card
- Приключения пингвинёнка Лоло
- Directed by: Kenjirō Yoshida; Gennady Sokolsky
- Written by: Viktor Merezhko; Eiichi Tachi
- Produced by: Toru Komori; Takeo Nishiguchi
- Starring: Svetlana Stepchenko; Lyudmila Gnilova; Rolan Bykov; Elena Sanaeva
- Narrated by: Aleksey Batalov
- Cinematography: Alexander Chekhovsky
- Music by: Masahito Maruyama
- Production companies: Life Work Corp; Soyuzmultfilm; Sovinfilm; Aist Corporation; Jim Terry Productions (US version, "Scamper"); Enoki Films USA
- Release date: June 25, 1987
- Running time: 78 minutes
- Countries: Japan; Soviet Union
- Languages: Russian; Japanese; English

The Adventures of Lolo the Penguin (Russian: Приключения пингвинёнка Лоло; renamed "The Adventures of Scamper the Penguin" in the United States) is a 1986 Russian animated coming-of-age adventure film, originally released as a three-part serial film. Its story focuses on a penguin named Lolo and his friend Pépé, who also become friends with Mak.

== Plot ==
The story begins with the end of winter, and the southern ocean showing the aurora australis. A raft of Adélie penguins, coming from the north, returns home. The females separate from their mates to go hunt as males build their nests from piles of pebbles. The females return to lay their eggs, only to eventually separate from the males again to find food, whilst the males take care of the eggs.

Eventually, most of the males give in to their hunger and leave to find some food as well. A flock of aggressive skuas constantly threatens to steal the penguin eggs and raids the nesting grounds while most of the flock is gone. Being the only one that stayed, a penguin named Toto saves the egg of another family, meanwhile one of their two eggs is stolen from their nest. When his mate, Lala, returns Toto admits that one of the eggs is not theirs. They return it to the rightful parents and have one egg for themselves.

When the eggs finally hatch, Toto and Lala receive a newborn penguin baby whom they name Lolo. He, like any other young penguin, is over-inquisitive and very curious, which can annoy some of the other penguins. Together with his best friend Pépé, Lolo goes on many journeys through the wild, learning about the creatures that live in region. He eventually also makes friends with a tame husky puppy called Don (though his name is Cowboy in the English version), who is on an Antarctic trek with his scientist master.

Eventually, however, Lolo and Pepe get separated from their home, and face many dangers such as attacks by leopard seals and killer whales. Eventually, they get captured by a large group of poachers, from whom they later escape with the help of a macaroni penguin named Mak and an old guard dog on board named Jack.

The young penguins return home, only to find that the poachers have also come to catch all the baby penguins to sell to a zoo; Despite some of the penguins getting killed in the operation, including Toto, Lolo leads a successful rescue and the poacher's ship is sunk when a chunk of ice falls off a nearby iceberg and causes a tidal wave.

The story ends with Don and the scientist flying home in a helicopter as the winter comes, Mak sets out alone to find his own family, and the other penguins go northward again, now led by Lolo.

== Characters ==
- Lolo (Russian: Лоло; Scamper in the United States version) is the main character of the story. A blue penguin chick, the son of the flock leader Toto and his wife Lala, and Pepe’s best friend. At the end of the story, he became a new leader of the flock after his father's tragic death.
- Pepe (Russian: Пепé; Snowflake in the United States version) is a pink female penguin and Lolo's best friend. She is very timid and shy.
- Mak (Russian: Мак; Louie in the United States version) is a black macaroni penguin with three gold feathers on his head. He escaped from the poachers along with Lolo and Pepe. At the end of the story, he set out alone to find his own family.
- Toto (Russian: Тотó; Gilbert in the United States version) is a black male penguin. He is Lolo's father and Lala's husband as well as the leader of the whole flock of Adélie penguins. He died along with the other penguins during the showdown with the poachers.
- Lala (Russian: Лалá; Gracie in the United States version) is Lolo's mother and Toto's wife. She is a dark blue female penguin with a very soft character. She loves Lolo very much and was very worried while he was missing.
- Grandfather Pigo (Russian: Дедушка Пиго; Mr. Feather in the United States version) is a grey old penguin who is also a teacher at the penguin chicks' kindergarten. He is strict, but kind.
- Nini (Russian: Нини; Rosie in the United States version) is a blue female penguin. She is teacher at the penguin chicks' kindergarten along with the Grandfather Pigo.
- Don (Russian: Дон; Cowboy in the United States version) is a friendly puppy of an Eskimo dog, a friend of Lolo and Pepe. His owner is a polar scientist, who loves penguins.
- Jack (Russian: Джек) is an old Saint Bernard dog on the poachers' ship. He served the poachers by signaling the approach of a storm with his howl.
- The Poachers are dangerous villains and «men in black» as Grandfather Pigo called them. They tried to capture all the baby penguins and then sell them to a zoo for a good price. At the end, they presumably died after their ship has been taken down by a tsunami.

== Voices ==
Character	Russian	Japanese	US English
Narrator	Aleksey Batalov	Tokiko Katō	Mona Marshall
Lolo (Scamper)	Svetlana Stepchenko	Kazuko Sugiyama	Cheryl Chase
Pépé (Snowflake)	Lyudmila Gnilova	Sanae Miyuki	Kathy Ritter
Grandfather Pigo (Mr. Feather)	Vyacheslav Nevinny	Hidekatsu Shibata	Jan Rabson
Nini (Rosie)	Lyudmila Gnilova	Chiyoko Kawashima	Kathy Ritter
Toto (Gilbert, Lolo's father)	Rolan Bykov	Keaton Yamada	Richard Rossner
Lala (Gracie, Lolo's mother)	Elena Sanaeva	Akiko Tsuboi	Mona Marshall
Don (Cowboy, Husky puppy who befriends Scamper and helps him get home)	Lyudmila Gnilova	Eiko Yamada	Mona Marshall
Jack (the Saint Bernard dog)	Yevgeny Leonov	Minoru Yada	Jan Rabson
Mak (Louie, the nearly solid-black feathered Macaroni Penguin)	Natalya Chenchik	Hiroko Maruyama	Mona Marshall
polar explorer (the scientist)	Nikolai Grabbe	Masaru Ikeda	Jan Rabson
poachers (the sailors)	Yuri Volyntsev, Vladimir Ferapontov, Vyacheslav Bogachev, Vladimir Soshalsky	Naoki Tatsuta, Ikuya Sawaki	Richard Rossner, Jan Rabson

== Production ==
The original film was created by Takeo Nishiguchi who had sought a co-production with Soviet animation. He contacted them in 1980 and the film took several years to develop. During this time, the Soviet animation industry received film equipment commonly used in Japan. Although this wasn't the first time Russia and Japan collaborated to make an animated film, it was the first one to be primarily made in Russia.

The film was animated in 1986 by Soyuzmultfilm. It was co-produced by Soyuzmultflm and Japan's Lifework Corporation with music by Masahito Maruyama. It was sponsored by Aist Corporation and Sovinfilm. The Russian version premiered on Soviet television on June 25, 1987, whilst the Japanese version was released as an OVA in 1988.

== English versions ==
Two English dubs of Lolo have been produced, the first of which being produced by Moscow-based Filmexport Studios which was known to make English dubs of Soviet cinema for Sovexportfilm, although it used to be assumed to have been produced in the United Kingdom. Even with the English dubbing, the music, names, and titles were not changed and stayed in their original form. This version also kept the serial in the form of separate parts.

Although keeping the same style and font as the credits of the Russian version, the credits of the original English version only credited much of the key figures by the first letter of their first name and their last name (i.e. E. Tati, V. Merezhko, G. Sokolsky, K. Yasaida), and according to the credits, the English credit translations were done by Nikolai Kurnakov, while the voice actors in this version were uncredited. The copyrights for the three part serial go from 1987 to 1989.

In 2005, Force Entertainment put out a Region 4 DVD release of the film in Australia, using the Filmexport dubbed version. However, this DVD is heavily edited from the original source, with 15 minutes of footage deleted, not only because of censorship, but also due to the unremastered copy used, as evidenced by various scenes in this version, such as the ending scene. The edits were also done extremely roughly and are quite noticeable too.

=== Deleted scenes ===
- The Aurora Australis at the beginning of the film. (It is kept at the end of the film.)
- The introduction at the beginning. Both this and the former were replaced by 2 static shots of the Aurora Australias with an English version of the opening notice and the film's opening card (albeit in a different font)
- Toto spanks Lolo.
- Part of the Kindergarten scene with Nini, where the young penguins are running and sliding on the block of ice.
- Lolo and Pepe try to get the attention of Emperor penguins.
- Jack talking to the three caged penguins.
- Lolo, Pepe, and Mak slide down the banister.
- Lolo, Pepe, and Mak swim for the first time.
- Grandfather Pigo being shot.
- The scene where Toto fights for the rifle, but gets shot and killed.
- Three background penguins shot and killed (but the following scene is kept, and the dialogue of Grandfather Pigo explains Toto had perished.)

The second English dub of Lolo was done by Jim Terry Productions and localized by Enoki Films USA, it was released to VHS in 1990 by Celebrity Home Entertainment, and was later re-released by Feature Films for Families. Allumination Filmworks, under license from Feature Films for Families, put this version on DVD in 2005. This English dub was titled The Adventures of Scamper the Penguin, and, similar to the 2005 Force DVD of Filmexport's dub, had a number of edits done to make it more appropriate for American children, including but not limited to:

- The small overture containing post-production credits and plays glass harmonica music. This is replaced by a brand new theme song that plays after the Enoki Films USA logo.
- Both scenes of the Aurora Australis.
- The scene of Toto asking Popo why he is leaving is altered, in the original, there was snow in the area, in this version, the snow is removed.
- The scene where Toto tells Lolo why he can't go off yet is changed to him telling him about when he fought the seagulls.
- The scene where an adult male penguin (named Gugu in the original and Gray Beak in this one) alerts Toto (Gilbert) of seagulls. In the original version, he is alerting about humans.
- The first conversation that Lolo has with Grandfather Pigo is altered. He now encourages the young penguin to "(metaphorically) explore the world". In the original version, Pigo answers Lolo's question about humans and is trying to avoid Lolo's questions about Zoos.
- The scene of Lolo invading a bird's nest, attempting to befriend a baby seagull, and being attacked by an adult seagull. However, Lolo's face when he sees the bird charging towards him is edited and moved to the scene when the Seagulls attack Lolo.
- The scene of Lolo being spanked by his father Toto.
- When Toto finds out that Lolo left the colony a second time, he asks what he is going to do with him, in the original, he proposes to try and save them.
- The scene where Pigo talks about the humans after the scientist drops off Lolo is changed to him not believing Lolo about the scientist saving him. In addition, Toto's line after that is changed to him telling Lolo he is really in trouble instead of telling him that he would talk to him at home.
- In the original, there was never a reason as to why Pigo looked into the elephant seal's mouth, in this version however, he decided to look at its tooth structure.
- The scene where Pigo falls from a hill is altered. The children's laughter from the elephant seal incident is now reused for the falling incident.
- The scene where an orca is about to eat a leopard seal.
- The scene where Nini tells Lolo to sit out of class for showing off. In the original version, she tells Lolo, that he is not old enough to swim yet.
- The scene involving the death of Toto, as well as several other adult penguins, causing the ending of the film to have no reason why Lolo became leader. However, all the shots with rifles in them were retained.
- The scene where poachers are drowning from a tidal wave.
- The scene where the community of penguins mourns the fatalities was edited.
- Most scenes with blood are edited, with the exception of Lolo's wound from being abducted by a seagull.
- There is an added "The End" title at the end of the film.

Among these edits were changing the names of almost all the characters. Lolo's name was changed to Scamper, Pepe's name was changed to Snowflake, Mak became Louie, Toto & Lala became Gilbert & Gracie, Grandfather Pigo became Mr. Feather, Nini became Rosie, and Don became Cowboy. Jack was the only character to keep his original name. The music score was also changed from the orchestral music used in the original version to a synthesized one done by Mark Mercury (credited as Bullets), and also added original songs that play over certain scenes, such as the seabird raid, Lolo and Pepe teaching Don how to slide, and the scene when Lolo, Pepe, and Mak return home.

In order for this version to stay at almost the same running time as the Lolo version, certain frames and cels from Scamper were reused in certain scenes, most notably in the scenes that use music. Amazon Prime Instant Video's print did not use the English version, but instead used the Russian dubbed version with optional English subtitles.

== Other versions ==
Most dubs of the film were either sourced from the original film or the Scamper version of the movie. The latter is due to Enoki Films handling the localization rights to Scamper, resulting in most dubs being sourced from that version, however, there are a couple versions of the movie that are slightly more unique

=== French version ===
There was previously a French-Canadian dub of the movie sourced from the US version, but there was also a dub done in France, which was given a theatrical release by Arkeion Films on April 13, 2005, 18 years after the Russian language version came out and two and a half months after the release of the French penguin documentary film March of the Penguins. The French is basically a carbon copy of the German dub of the film (Bauzi – Der Kleine Pinguin) with the music, names, and the violence in the climax restored from The Adventures of Lolo the Penguin. The French version also adds some new music done by Raphael Devillers, and possibly due to the German version being used as a source film, certain music pieces from Lolo are out of sync in the French dub.

=== German version ===
The German dub titled Bauzi – Der Kleine Pinguin was sourced from the Scamper version, including the new theme song and credits as well as the new music. Both the theme song and the credits were translated into German. The opening credits are abridged instead of the credits, all the songs are higher pitched, and for some reason, Lolo is called a Humboldt Penguin, which doesn't live in Antarctica, the fact of him being an Adelie Penguin is actually acknowledged in the US version. However, several deleted scenes were restored:

- The scene of Lolo being spanked by his father Toto.
- The scene where Pigo falls from a hill is completely restored, as a result, it shows the penguins looking with their eyes instead of them laughing at him, though laughing can still be heard.
- The scene where an orca is about to eat a leopard seal.
- The scene where poachers are drowning from a tidal wave.
- The scene where the community of penguins mourns the fatalities is partially restored, though it is unknown if Pigo mentioned that Toto died in this version.

=== Dutch version ===
The Dutch version is known as De Avonturen van Pim de Pinguïn (The Adventures of Pim the Penguin) and has elements of the Scamper version (use of a theme song) and the Russian version, but it contains a completely different theme, soundtrack, and sound effects, the latter especially being notable due to the dub's overabundance of goofy cartoony sound effects (which were not present in the Lolo version and were scarcely used in the Scamper version). This is also the only version of Lolo to have been given a widescreen release as well.
