= Galactic Gale Baxingar =

Japanese anime television series

- Screenshot from the anime depicting the robot Baxingar

銀河烈風バクシンガー (Ginga Reppuu Baxinga)
- Genre: Mecha
- Anime television series
- Directed by: Yoshikata Nitta
- Produced by: Kazuo Komatsubara; Shigeo Tsubota
- Written by: Yu Yamamoto
- Studio: Kokusai Eiga-sha
- Licensed by: NA: Enoki Films (licensing) Discotek Media (home video; expired)
- Original network: TV Tokyo
- Original run: July 6, 1982 – March 29, 1983
- Episodes: 39

Galactic Gale Baxingar (銀河烈風バクシンガー, Ginga Reppū Bakushingā) is a mecha anime series that aired from July 6, 1982, to March 29, 1983, in Japan on TV Tokyo. There were 39 episodes released. Other loosely translated names include Baxinger, Galaxy Gale Baxingar, Galactic Stormwind Baxingar and Cosmo Rangers. In addition, it was known as "Mustanger" while sold as a knock-off toy in the United States during the early 1980s. It is the second entry of the J9 Series, serving as a sequel to Galaxy Cyclone Braiger and followed by Galactic Whirlwind Sasuraiger. Its plot was based on the Japanese late Tokugawa period and the story of the Shinsengumi samurai.

== Original story ==
The story is set 600 years after the destruction of Jupiter where the Solar System was in a state of peace under the Bakufu government. However, the lawlessness of this new Solar System prompts a man named Dan Condor to organize a new J9 team to fight against injustice. Equipped with Cosmobikes, they merge into a super robot named Baxingar.

== Concept ==
The main robot, Baxingar, is assembled from five motorbikes and stands at 48 meters tall.

== Cast ==
- Kaneto Shiozawa as Mahoroba Shiro / Billy the Shot
- Kazuyuki Sogabe as Stecken Radcliffe / Double-edged Stecken
- Kan Tokumaru as Diego Kondo / Don Condor
- Katsuji Mori as Samanosuke Dodi / The Flying Sama
- Yoko Asagami as Lyra Minezato / Lyra the Immortal Butterfly

== Video games ==
Baxingar has been featured in the video game below:

1. Super Robot Wars Taisen GC
2. Super Robo Wars Taisen XO

Baxingar has been featured in the video game Super Robot Wars GC alongside the other titular robots Braiger and Sasuraiger. The only enemy units from the series to appear in the game are the Shin Wakusei Rengu Battleship and the Krauwanka.
