= Vampire Hunter D (video game) =

1999 video game

- Developer: Victor Interactive Software
- Publishers: JP: Victor Interactive Software; NA: Jaleco; EU: JVC Music Europe
- Platform: PlayStation
- Release: JP: December 9, 1999; PAL: 2000; NA: September 28, 2000
- Genre: Survival horror
- Mode: Single-player

Vampire Hunter D (バンパイアハンターD, Banpaia Hantā D) is a PlayStation video game based on the series of books and movies of the same name. Along with Countdown Vampires, it is one of the few survival horror games to revolve around vampires.

== Gameplay ==
The gameplay is similar to the earlier games in the Resident Evil series; because characters are fully polygonal, whereas the backgrounds are pre-rendered, and to 3D Castlevania games (Castlevania 64, Castlevania: Lament of Innocence, Castlevania: Curse of Darkness).

Comparable to Resident Evil, the gameplay consists of thoroughly exploring a castle, collecting items, keys, and solving puzzles to progress.

The player character, D, has the ability to walk or run, and can switch between two modes of basic function. "Battle mode" and "search mode." The former mode has D unsheathing his sword, with the ability to use an enemy lock-on mechanic, as well as performing basic attack combos and jump attacks with his sword. The latter mode has D's sword sheathed and allows the player to more easily pick up items and search environmental assets, since D is incapable of attacking with his sword outside of "battle mode." D also has the ability to perform a dash attack by running toward an enemy and unsheathing his sword, immediately initiating a powerful sword strike.

There are also defensive maneuvers D can employ. The game features the ability to block, as well as the ability to dodge enemy attacks in three different directions by double tapping D-pad inputs.

D can also use the Left Hand character to absorb enemies after they've been damaged to a certain degree, unleash a powerful magic attack, and use a healing ability. D's Left Hand works on a meter that drains over time, and absorbing enemies fills the meter that allows D to use these specific powers, which can be toggled in the inventory screen, or by cycling through them with the Select button during gameplay. D can also earn an extra life once the hand's meter is filled, indicated by a hat and cape icon next to the Left Hand's meter. Upon death, D's hand will revive him, as long as this icon was earned.

There are two additional meters tied to D's status. An HP (hit points) meter and a VP (vampire power) meter. The HP meter is his basic health status, while the VP meter governs how strong D's attack power is, and how much health D will recover when he uses blood pills - a healing item found fairly commonly throughout the game.

Vampire Hunter D also employs the aforementioned inventory system. Along with environmental objects, maps, and keys, D can collect sub-weapons to use, such as wooden darts, flash bangs, and hand grenades. D can also collect potions and the aforementioned blood pills. The potions will raise D's HP, but drains his VP. Blood pills will raise both meters. Alternatively, D can raise his VP meter by standing close to enemies and attacking, allowing D to absorb their blood.

Throughout the game, D faces a number of different monsters and boss characters, and can use his sword and sub-weapons to defeat them. There are also seldom, simple platforming segments.

Vampire Hunter D features three separate endings which can be earned respectively by visiting certain areas, collecting certain items, and making certain decisions throughout the game when prompted to do so. There are also three difficulty modes to choose from, that all vary in the number of healing items D starts with, as well as enemy damage output and enemy health.

== Story ==
The story of the game is similar to that of the second movie, Vampire Hunter D: Bloodlust (which, in turn, is based on the third novel). Essentially, D, a Dhampir (transliterated as Dunpeal) vampire hunter is hired by an old man named Elbourne to save his daughter Charlotte, who was kidnapped by a vampire, Meier Link. If his daughter was already mutated into a vampiress, then D should kill her humanely. Also, Elbourne's son hired a team of human vampire hunters known as the Marcus Brothers to serve as backup. There are a fairly large number of differences between the film and the game, however. The game's story is more streamlined and the whole of the story largely takes place inside of Camila's castle.

Only two of the Barbarois mutants (Benge and Mashira) appear as enemies, Caroline being not featured. Borgoff and Leila were the only members of the Marcus brothers which were notably featured, with Leila actually becoming a playable character at one point; Kyle, Nolt, and Grove make few cameos in cutscenes, and later are found dead. There are 3 possible endings based on the player's actions in-game, 1 of which is similar to the end of the film.

== Reception ==
Reception

Aggregate score
Aggregator	Score
Metacritic	32/100

Review scores
Publication	Score
AllGame	2/5
Electronic Gaming Monthly	4/10, 4.5/10, 4.5/10
Famitsu	26/40
Game Informer	5.25/10
GameFan	78/100, 72/100, 51/100
GameSpot	5.5/10
Jeuxvideo.com	14/20
Next Generation	1/5
Official U.S. PlayStation Magazine	2/5
PlayStation: The Official Magazine	1/5

The game received "unfavorable" reviews according to the review aggregation website Metacritic.

Yoshiyuki Ike Sato of GameSpot criticized the control of the Japanese import, stating that "One of the main problems with the game is the control. The addition of jump, guard, and strafe functions may sound like a good idea, but it's actually the cause of the problem." In the same review, the game's visuals and animations were also criticized, with the reviewer stating, "The motion of D drawing and putting away his sword is good, but many other animations are poor." Chet Barber of NextGen said, "Being fans of the anime, we really wanted to like the game. But even fans should avoid this at all costs." In Japan, Famitsu gave it a score of 26 out of 40.
