= Miracle Girl Limit-chan =

Japanese anime television series

ミラクル少女リミットちゃん (Mirakuru Shōjo Rimitto-chan)
- Genre: Magical girl
- Anime television series
- Written by: Masaki Tsuji
- Music by: Shunsuke Kikuchi
- Studio: Toei Animation
- Original network: ANN (NET)
- Original run: October 1, 1973 – March 25, 1974
- Episodes: 25

Miracle Girl Limit-chan (ミラクル少女リミットちゃん, Mirakuru Shōjo Rimitto-chan) is a Japanese magical girl anime television series consisting of 25 episodes. It was directed by Takeshi Tamiya and Masayuki Akehi, and it was first broadcast on TV Asahi (then NET) in 1973. Based on an original story by Shinji Nagashima and Hiromi Productions, the series featured character designs by Kazuo Komatsubara and scripts by Masaki Tsuji. It is the sixth of Toei Animation's original majokko (magical girl) anime series, although, as with Cutie Honey, the title character's powers are derived from science rather than magic.

The series was given the time slot on NET (TV Asahi) traditionally reserved for past Toei majokko shows, replacing Cutie Honey, which had been planned for that time slot but was retooled as a more shounen-oriented series. Limit-chan suffered from low ratings during its original broadcast run in Japan but became a mainstream hit some years later in Italy under the title Cybernella. Despite its relative lack of popularity in Japan, the series was rerun on NET/TV Asahi five times through 1978 and twice on TVK.

The title character's nickname, Limit (her real name is Satomi), comes from the series' original proposal, in which she was given a time limit of one year to live after her accident. Thinking this idea too grim, Hiromi Productions and Toei retooled the series as a traditional magical-girl slice-of-life drama with the added element of the character being a cyborg rather than human.

== Plot summary ==
Satomi Nishiyama (nicknamed "Limit") is the daughter of Dr. Nishiyama. One year she was mortally wounded during a plane crash which also kills her mother. Her father was able to revive her, by making her a cyborg.

As a cyborg she is gifted with "Miracle Powers" and accessories that aid her in solving problems. Her red beret can be used as a radio to contact her father, and her boots have super speed. She is also able to transform with her pendant. Limit-chan has a robot pet dog named Guu.

Limit keeps her cybernetic powers a secret, as she fears being shunned by society. She keeps to herself and sometimes keeps a distance from others. Her secret is only known by her father and his assistants.

== Characters ==
- Satomi ("Limit") Nishiyama (西山 理美 / リミット, Nashiyama Satomi / Rimitto) – The title character of the series, revived as a cyborg by her father, Dr. Nishiyama, at the brink of death after an airplane accident that killed her mother. She is eleven years old, in grade five, and is well-liked by most of the other students in her class. She lives as close to a normal life as she can, keeping the fact that she is a cyborg a secret. She is insecure about her place in society and wishes she were human. Her father has granted her special powers and items with which she helps her friends solve problems. She is voiced by Youko Kuri.
- Dr. Nishiyama (西山 博士 / Nishiyama-hakase) – Limit's father. A genius of cyborg sciences and director of the Nishiyama Science Institute. He wants to restore Limit's body back to normal. He is voiced by Hidekatsu Shibata.
- Ms. Tomi (トミさん) – The Nishiyama family's live-in housekeeper and nanny to Limit. She lived in Hawaii for 38 years and can speak English as well as Japanese. She is voiced by Masako Nozawa.
- Guu (グー, Gū) – Limit's robot dog, made as a replacement for the real dog who was killed in the plane crash that injured Limit and killed her mother. He has an excellent sense of smell and is powered by a solar battery, which causes him to become very tired when no sunlight is available. He is voiced by Sachiko Chijimatsu.
- Midori Yumoto (湯本 みどり, Yumoto Midori) – Dr. Nishiyama's assistant, secretary, and love interest. She is the only other person aside from the doctor who knows that Limit is a cyborg. In the original series proposal, she was to marry Dr. Nishiyama and become Limit's stepmother, but the anime's early cancellation forced a different ending. She is also voiced by Sachiko Chijimatsu.
- Nobuko Asami (浅見 信子, Asami Nobuko) – Limit's best friend, a bespectacled girl who wears her hair in twin pigtails. Often called Buko for short, she is a tomboy and occasionally jealous of Limit. She is voiced by Keiko Yamamoto.
- Tomoo Asami (浅見 友男, Asami Tomoo) – Buko's younger brother. He is voiced by Yoshiko Yamamoto.
- Boss (ボス, Bosu) – The class bully (his real name is Ryūta Ishibashi / 石橋 隆太, Ishibashi Ryūta). However, he is all talk and something of a coward and will usually try to talk his way out of fights. He is jealous of Limit's popularity. He is voiced by Kaneta Kimotsuki. He has a younger sister named Ayako (voiced by Kaoru Ozawa and Sachiko Chijimatsu) whom Tomoo has a crush on. He has two sidekicks, Yosaburo (voiced by Masako Nozawa) and Ichiyen (voiced by Shunji Yamada).
- Mitsuko Takeshita (竹下 光子, Takeshita Mitsuko) – A snobby, popular transfer student who becomes Limit's rival for class supremacy. She is voiced by Rihoko Yoshida and Sachiko Chijimatsu, and is always accompanied by a clique of hangers-on.
- Ms. Otohime (乙姫 先生, Otohime-sensei) – Limit's homeroom teacher. Her real name is Keiko Suzuki (鈴木 圭子, Suzuki Keiko) but is nicknamed "Ms. Otohime" for her good looks. She is strict but friendly. In the final episode, she reveals to her class that she is leaving her teaching job to marry Mr. Sakata. She is voiced by Akiko Tsuboi.
- Mr. Sakata (坂田 先生, Sakata-sensei) – Limit's strict physical education teacher. His real name is Kintoki Sakata (坂田 金時, Sakata Kintoki). He and Ms. Otohime get engaged in the final episode. He is voiced by Kouji Yada.

== Limit's powers ==
Limit's Miracle Powers can be activated with a click of the dial on her special pendant. She has Miracle Power, which gives her superhuman strength; Miracle Jump, which allows her to jump unusually high; and Miracle Run, with which she can outrun a car at full speed. With her pendant, she can also transform into whatever she wants by saying the phrase "Change Face" and can transform back to her normal self by saying "Change back!"

She has been given seven magical tools which aid her in helping her friends solve problems. In addition to her pendant, she has a shoulder bag equipped with wings enabling her to fly; her red beret, which she can use as a walkie-talkie of sorts to contact her father; her red boots, which enable her to dance; magical lip balm with which she can write messages; a compact which shines light; a coin purse which keeps Limit's money safe by enabling the money to fly away when a thief tries to steal it; and a flower ring which emits a hypnotic, aromatic fragrance.

== Episode list ==
No.	Title	Original release date
1	"Hello, Ms. Tomboy"; Transliteration: "Otenbasan konnichiwa" (Japanese: おてんばさんこんにちわ)	October 1, 1973
Limit secretly uses her powers to assist Boss in rescuing Tomoo. However, Boss then boasts about how heroic he is.
2	"Something's Not Right"; Transliteration: "Nandaka hendazo" (Japanese: なんだかへんだぞ)	October 8, 1973
Boss stuns his classmate by finishing his math tests with ease. Limit suffers from mysterious headaches and can't concentrate.
3	"I've Been Exposed?!"; Transliteration: "Mirare chatta wa" (Japanese: 見られちゃったワ!?)	October 15, 1973
Limit worries that her true identity is at risk after Chibo sees her perform a "Miracle Jump."
4	"The Transfer Student is My Rival"; Transliteration: "Tenkousei wa raibaru" (Japanese: 転校生はライバル)	October 22, 1973
Mitsuko, a rich girl from Tokyo transfers to Limit's school.
5	"My Bride"; Transliteration: "Boku no oyomesan" (Japanese: ぼくのおヨメさん)	October 29, 1973
Tomoo has a crush on Boss's little sister, Ayako.
6	"I Hate You, Papa!!"; Transliteration: "Papa daikirai!!" (Japanese: パパ大嫌い!!)	November 5, 1973
Limit is upset after her father misses parents day at school.
7	"Fallen Leaves and a Violin"; Transliteration: "ochiba to baiorin" (Japanese: 落葉とバイオリン)	November 12, 1973
Limit's classmate, Hideko, sacrifices her social life to fulfill her father's dream.
8	"A True Genius"; Transliteration: "Honto no shuusai" (Japanese: ほんとの秀才)	November 19, 1973
Limit tries to help the school prodigy, Hiroshi.
9	"Transform! Errorman"; Transliteration: "Henshin! Eraaman" (Japanese: 変身！エラーマン)	November 26, 1973
Tomoo gets depressed after getting constantly scolded by Mr. Sakata. Limit fakes being sick.
10	"My Bag Full of Dreams"; Transliteration: "Yume ga ippai watashi no ryukku" (Japanese: 夢がいっぱいわたしのリュック)	December 3, 1973
Buko has a feud with Limit and becomes Mitsuko's friend.
11	"I Wanna Be a Man Like Boss"; Transliteration: "Bosu no youna otoko ni naritai" (Japanese: ボスのような男になりたい)	December 10, 1973
Tomoo thinks trying to be like Boss will win Ayako's affection.
12	"Angel of the Chapel"; Transliteration: "Chiyaperu no tenshi" (Japanese: チャペルの天使)	December 17, 1973
Limit creates a Christmas miracle for her classmate, Miyako.
13	"That Town, This Town, End of Year Town"; Transliteration: "Ano machi kono machi kure no machi" (Japanese: あの町この町暮れの町)	December 24, 1973
Limit meets an American girl who wants to make mochi for New Years.
14	"Still a Girl, after all." Transliteration: "Sore de onna no ko" (Japanese: それでも女の子)	January 7, 1974
Boss wants Limit on his baseball team, but her father objects.
15	"School's Backgate, Backgate Tears"; Transliteration: "Gakkou uramon namidamon" (Japanese: 学校裏門なみだ門)	January 14, 1974
Limit receives news that her father has fallen ill.
16	"Kidnapped"; Transliteration: "yuukai" (Japanese: 誘拐)	January 21, 1974
Limit and Tomoo are kidnapped by three men. Limit is unable to use her powers to escape.
17	"The Rooster's Eggs"; Transliteration: "Ondori no tamago" (Japanese: おんどりのタマゴ)	January 28, 1974
Boss tries to protect his sister's pet rooster.
18	"Ms. Otohime's Big Problem"; Transliteration: "Otomesensei dai pinchi" (Japanese: 乙姫先生大ピンチ)	February 4, 1974
Ms. Otohime has a meeting with a suitor. Limit intervenes.
19	"The Phantom Wolf"; Transliteration: "Maboroshi no ookami" (Japanese: 幻の狼)	February 11, 1974
Limit and her father take a trip to Akazawa Valley, where they hear stories of a phantom wolf.
20	"Ice Skating Goddess"; Transliteration: "Sukeeto no megami" (Japanese: スケートの女神)	February 18, 1974
Two men want Limit to be part of their ice show. Buko gets upset with Limit.
21	"The Magic Beret Disappeared"; Transliteration: "Kieta majiiku beree" (Japanese: 消えたマジックベレー)	February 25, 1974
Limit is suspected of committing arson.
22	"Spring Brings a Love Song"; Transliteration: "Haru wo yobu ai no uta" (Japanese: 春を呼ぶ愛の歌)	March 4, 1974
Limit meets an old man who is nursing an injured swan back to health.
23	"Run, Graffiti Railway"; Transliteration: "Hashire rakugaki teddou" (Japanese: 走れラクガキ鉄道)	March 11, 1974
Limit and her friends investigate the mystery of chalk drawn train tracks.
24	"Goodbye, Captain"; Transliteration: "Sayonara Kaputen" (Japanese: さよならキャプテン)	March 18, 1974
Limit and Mitsuko compete for the role of Princess Kaguya in a school play. Limit gets to know her school's soccer star.
25	"Congratulations Teacher"; Transliteration: "Omedetou sensei" (Japanese: おめでとう先生)	March 25, 1974
Limit and friends want to know who Ms. Otohime is marrying. Limit finally reveals her true identity.
