= Pokonyan! =

Japanese anime television series

ポコニャン!
- Manga
- Written by: Fujiko F. Fujio
- Published by: Ushio Publishing Co., Ltd.
- Imprint: Kibō Comics
- Magazine: Kibō no Tomo
- Original run: April 1975 – May 1978
- Volumes: 2
- Anime television series
- Directed by: Hiroshi Sasagawa (Chief Director); Seitarō Hara
- Written by: Shun'ichi Yukimuro
- Music by: Masae Sagara; Keita Miyahara
- Studio: Animation 21
- Licensed by: Enoki Films USA
- Original network: NHK General TV (eps 1-150); NHK Educational TV (eps 151-170)
- Original run: April 5, 1993 – March 30, 1996
- Episodes: 170

Pokonyan! (ポコニャン) is a 1993–1996 sci-fi manga and anime series produced by NHK. There are 170 episodes, each 10 minutes long. It is licensed by Enoki Films as Rocky Rackat!. It is mainly about daily life, made by Fujiko F. Fujio (credited as Fujiko Fujio), who shares a name with the main character in the manga. This article also covers the TV anime series "Pokonyan!" which is based on the manga.

Pokonyan! was very popular in the 1990s, when tanuki were trending.

== Characters ==
- Pokonyan (ポコニャン) / Rocky Rackat: A mix between a cat and a raccoon.
- Miki Konoha (木の葉 ミキ Konoha Miki) / Amy: A young girl who is Pokonyan's friend.
- Midori Konoha (木の葉 ミドリ Konoha Midori): Miki's mother
- Shigeru Konoha (木の葉 シゲル Konoha Shigeru): Miki's father

== TV anime ==
The anime was broadcast on NHK under the title Pokonyan! from April 5, 1993, to March 30, 1996. It was broadcast on General TV until April 1, 1994, and on Educational TV starting April 4, 1994.

General TV
It aired from April 5, 1993, to April 1, 1994. The broadcast time was every Monday to Friday from 17:50 to 18:00.
The first episodes from "My Little Brother Has a Tail" to "Everyone is Pokonyan's Friend" and the rebroadcast of episode 9 were broadcast on Educational TV's "Mother and Child TV Time Special (2)" on December 31, 1993, from 16:10 to 16:35.
Educational TV
The broadcast went from April 4, 1994, to March 30, 1996. Until March 31, 1995, it was broadcast every Monday to Friday from 8:50 to 9:00 and 17:25 to 17:35, but from April 3 of the same year, it was changed to only broadcast in the evenings.
The first episodes from episode 151 "Traffic Jams Are Fun, Meow" to episode 170 "Grandpa's Road Safety, Meow" and reruns of all 170 episodes are broadcast randomly. The same program is broadcast in both the morning and afternoon on the same day (the afternoon is treated as a rerun of the morning program). The first episode was broadcast at the beginning of 1994 and 1995, and the final episode (episode 148 "Goodbye, Start, Meow") was broadcast at the end of the year.

In 1998 And 1999 Pokonyan Was Premiere in Spain Is Call Rocky Rackat Mi Amigo, El Mapache On Telecinco It was dubbed By Alamis Doblaje Of Arait Multimedia S.A. Madrid

== History ==
Its predecessor, Pokonyan, was serialized as a short comic only at the end of the issue of Yojiehon (Ushio Publishing) from the July 1970 issue to the January 1974 issue. A medium-length comic based on the original story, Pokonyan, was serialized in Kibo no Tomo (Ushio Publishing) from the April 1975 issue to the May 1978 issue. The story revolves around a mysterious creature called Pokonyan who uses mysterious powers and tools to help the boy he lives with.

From 1980 to 1981, some episodes were adapted into an animated TV series called Doraemon, with the characters replaced by Doraemon characters.

In 1993, 15 years after the serialization ended, it was adapted into a TV anime series called "Pokonyan!" (170 episodes in total). To differentiate it from Fujiko F. Fujio's flagship work "Doraemon," only the existence of Pokonyan and his mysterious powers were retained from the original work. The story was completely rewritten to create a completely original anime work, with a lower audience than "Doraemon," aimed at toddlers and early elementary school students. In the same year, Michiaki Tanaka (a former animation staff member at Fujiko Studio) drew a manga of the same name that was a direct adaptation of the TV anime version, and it was published in "Shogaku Ichinensei."

In 1994, a game based on the anime was released for the Game Boy and Super Famicom.

On September 3, 2016, the short film "Pokonyan & Doraemon: Pompokonyan de Kokohore Nyan Nyan!?" was released at the Fujiko F Fujio Museum, marking the first animated film in 23 years. To commemorate the release, the Fujiko F Fujio Complete Works "Pokonyan" with a cover featuring the anime illustration was released exclusively at the museum.

== Original works ==
=== Synopsis ===
Pokonyan, who lives in Taro's house, is a strange creature that is neither a cat nor a raccoon. With his mysterious psychic powers, he creates many fantastical items and goes on fun adventures with Taro.

=== Books ===
- Ushio Publishing Co., Ltd. (Hope Comics)
  - Volume 1 (First published on December 20, 1978, includes "Chojin-kun!")
  - Volume 2 (first published on December 20, 1978, also includes "Bellabo")
- Ushio Publishing <Full color version>- Full color at the beginning and two-tone color. Large format.
- Chuokoron-sha <Chuokoron Comics Fujiko Fujio Land > 2 volumes
- Ushio Publishing (Kibo Comics), published a new edition when the series was made into an anime by NHK. It does not include "Chojin-kun!" and "Bellabo", but instead includes "Pokonyan", which was serialized in "Yoji Ehon".
- Shogakukan "Pikkapika Comics", The first four pages are in color, while the rest are in two-color and monochrome.
  1. Released on July 30, 2004, ISBN 978-4-09-148051-4
  2. Released September 1, 2004, ISBN 978-4-09-148052-1
  3. Released October 1, 2004, ISBN 978-4-09-148053-8
- Shogakukan's "Complete Works of Fujiko F. Fujio", contains all stories.
  - Published on October 25, 2011, ISBN 978-4-09-143474-6

== Games ==
Pokonyan! Great Adventure of Dreams (Game Boy)
Toho / Shogakukan Productions, released August 5, 1994
Pokonyan! Henpokorin Adventure (Super Famicom)
Toho/Shogakukan Productions, released December 22, 1994

== Arcade games ==
Pokonyan! Balloon
Capcom / Fujiko F. Fujio, NHK, NEP, Shogakukan, Nippon Herald Films, released in 1995 / The player rides on a swaying Pokonyan-shaped balloon-shaped cabinet and watches the journey on the cabinet screen.
Pokonyan! Jumbo Friends
Capcom / Fujiko F. Fujio, NHK, NEP, Shogakukan, Nippon Herald Films, released in 1996 / You press a spinning slot. If you get the numbers right, a prize will come out.

== Theater animation ==
The title of the film is " Pokonyan & Doraemon: Pompokonyan, Come Here Nyan Nyan!?". It was released as a short film on September 3, 2016, the 5th anniversary of the opening of the Fujiko F. Fujio Museum at the F Theater. It is the first animated film in 23 years since the 1993 TV anime version, and Mita Yuko continues to play Pokonyan from the previous film. The story follows the original "Pokohore Nyan Nyan", and Taro, who did not appear in the previous film, which was significantly rearranged, makes his first appearance, while Doraemon and Nobita are also new characters.

=== Staff ===
- Original author: Fujiko F. Fujio
- Planning - Shunsuke Okura
- Director and Storyboard - Yoshihiro Osugi
- Directed by: Soichiro Zen
- Animation director: Osamu Miwa, Kazuki Nakamoto
- Art Director: Kazuhiro Arai
- Color design - Sanae Matsutani
- Sound Director - Akiyoshi Tanaka
- Production - Shinei Animation
