= Forza! Hidemaru =

Japanese anime television series

- フォルツァ!ひでまる
- Created by: Sunny Side Up
- Developed by: Hideo Takayashiki
- Directed by: Yoshihiro Takamoto
- Music by: Yuko Fukushima; Kaeru Mizugaki
- Country of origin: Japan
- Original language: Japanese
- No. of episodes: 26

Production
- Producers: Takeshi Sasamura (TV Tokyo); Naoki Sasada
- Animator: Gallop
- Production companies: TV Tokyo; NAS

Original release
- Network: TV Tokyo, TVO, TVA, TVh
- Release: April 6 – September 28, 2002

Related
- Manga

Hidemaru the Soccer Boy
- Written by: Makoto Mizobuchi
- Published by: Shogakukan
- Magazine: CoroCoro Comic
- Original run: 2002 – 2003
- Volumes: 2

Forza! Hidemaru (Japanese: フォルツァ!ひでまる, Hepburn: Forutsa! Hidemaru) is a Japanese anime television series. It was produced by NAS and aired on TV Tokyo for twenty-six episodes. Enoki Films licensed the series as Forza! Mario, and NAS refers to the series by that name on its English website. The series, about a boy who wants to play soccer, aired in 2002, the year of the FIFA World Cup in Japan and Korea.

Jonathan Clements and Helen McCarthy, the authors of The Anime Encyclopedia, Revised & Expanded Edition: A Guide to Japanese Animation Since 1917, wrote that the series "seems far out of its time in the early 21st century" but "the very young audience sees" the sports tropes "with fresh eyes." A manga adaptation, Hidemaru The Soccer Boy by Makoto Mizobuchi, was serialized in Shogakukan's Corocoro Comic.

Hidemaru appeared on the website nakata.net, Hidetoshi Nakata's official website.

== Characters ==
Clements and McCarthy stated that the cast consists of "wacky animals in sports getup" with a fox, two fat hippopotamus girls, dogs, horses, and rabbits.

- Hidemaru (ひでまる) / Mario – The main character, Hidemaru is a dog. His voice actress is Mayumi Asano.
- Sen-no-Joe (千の丞 Sen no Jō) – An old dog man who gives advice to Hidemaru on how to play the game. He had previously coached a team but lost the enthusiasm after the end of that team. His voice actor is Masaharu Satō.
- Nana (ナナ) – Sen-no-Joe's granddaughter and a dog. Enoki Films described her as the "Madonna of the team." Her voice actress is Sakura Nogawa.
- Rey (レイ Rei) – The team's cheerleader. Her voice actress is Misa Kimura (木村 美佐 Kimura Misa).
- Joe (ジョー Jō) – Described by Enoki Films as a "'cool' and affected sportsman." Joe is a Cheetah and a fast runner, Flora is in love with him. His voice actor is Daisuke Kishio.
- Kaizer (カイザー Kaizā) – The son of the owner of Club No. 1 (クラブNO.1 Kurabu No. 1) and the Wolf captain of that club. His voice actor is Kentarō Itō.
- Riki (リキ)
- Miki (ミキ) and Mika (ミカ) – Two hippo girls
- Flora (フローラ Furōra) – A rich wolf girl who is madly in love with Joe, and finances the team in order to be allowed to join as a cheerleader.
- Jūbei (十兵衛)
- Kiyoshirō (清四郎)
- Gengorō (源五郎) and Hanjirō (半次郎) – A mouse and bear whom are friends with Hidemaru.
- Ranmaru (蘭丸) – A little dog boy.
- Kyūtarō (キュータロウ) – An otter on Hidemaru's team.
- Dorufu (ドルフ) – A Dog.
- Inokuma (イノクマ) – A Boar boy.
- Kakunoshin (角の進) – A Ox boy.
- Kintarō (金太郎) – A Bear boy.
- Bison (バイソン Baison) – A Bison on Kaizer's team.
- Yanosuke (八の助) and Kunosuke (九の助) – Two crows that are part of Kaizer's team.
