= Vampire Hunter D =

Japanese horror novel series by Hideyuki Kikuchi and its franchise

- Cover of the first and titular Vampire Hunter D novel
- Author: Hideyuki Kikuchi
- Translator: Kevin Leahy
- Illustrator: Yoshitaka Amano
- Country: Japan
- Language: Japanese
- Genre: Dying Earth, horror, science fantasy, dark fantasy, post-apocalyptic
- Publisher: Asahi Sonorama and Asahi Shimbun Publications
- Published: 1983–present
- Published in English: 2005–present by DH Press
- Media type: Print (Paperback)
- No. of books: 58 (as of 2026) (Note: As of January 2026, consists of: 43 novels across 58 volumes; 1 short story collection (Dark Nocturne)) (List of books)

Vampire Hunter D (Japanese: 吸血鬼(バンパイア)ハンターD, Hepburn: Banpaia Hantā Dī) is a series of novels written by Japanese author Hideyuki Kikuchi and illustrated by Yoshitaka Amano since 1983.

As of June 2026, 58 novels have been published in the main series, with some novels comprising as many as four volumes. They have sold over 17 million copies worldwide, making Vampire Hunter D one of the best-selling book series in history. The series has also spawned anime, audio drama, manga, comic adaptations, a video game, as well as a short story collection, art books, and a supplemental guide book.

== Premise ==
Vampire hunter D wanders through a far-future post-nuclear war Earth that combines elements of pulp genres: western, science fiction, horror and Lovecraftian horror, dark fantasy, folklore, and occult science. The planet, once dominated by the vampires known as Nobles (貴族, Kizoku), ancient demons, mutants, and their technological creations, is now slowly returning to a semblance of order and human control—in part due to the decadence that brought about the downfall of the vampire race, the continued presence of frontier dwellers, and the rise of a caste of independent hunters-for-hire who eliminate supernatural threats.

Some time in 1999, a nuclear war occurred. The Nobility were vampires that planned for a possible nuclear war and sequestered all that was needed to rebuild civilization in their shelters. They use their science combined with magic to restore the world in their image. Nearly all magical creatures on Earth are genetically engineered by the Nobility to possess seemingly supernatural abilities, regeneration, and biological immortality, with a very small number being demons, gods, aliens, and extradimensional beings who survived the holocaust. Despite their technology being advanced enough to create a blood substitute as food, they still prefer to feed on humans. As such, they created a civilization where vampires and humans coexisted, eventually developing the planet into parklands and cities. The society eventually stagnates when vampire technology perfects scientific prophecy, which determines they are at their zenith of existence and doomed to fall, overthrown by humans. The human race was transformed at this time, with fear for the vampires being woven into their genetics, and the inability to remember vampire weaknesses such as garlic and crucifixes.

Unlike vampires from traditional lore, the Nobility can reproduce sexually, although their offspring will permanently cease aging after reaching physical maturity, having inherited their vampire parent's immortality.

== Main characters ==
=== D ===
D
- Vampire Hunter D character
- First appearance: Vampire Hunter D; 1983
- Created by: Hideyuki Kikuchi
- Designed by: Yoshitaka Amano
- Voiced by: Japanese: Kaneto Shiozawa (OVA, audio dramas); Hiroshi Yanaka (video game); Hideyuki Tanaka (Bloodlust); English: Michael McConnohie (OVA; 1992 Streamline dub); Andrew Philpot (Bloodlust); John DeMita (video game); John Gremillion (OVA; 2015 Sentai dub); David Cui Cui (GraphicAudio dramas)

In-universe information
- Species: Dhampir
- Gender: Male
- Occupation: Vampire Hunter

D is a dhampir, the half-breed child of a vampire father and human mother (actually genetically engineered by the ruler and first of vampires called Sacred Ancestor using his own DNA and that of humans in an experiment to create a vampire without vampires' typical weaknesses like the sun and having to drink blood), the ideal vampire hunter. He is renowned for his consummate skill and unearthly grace but feared and despised for his mixed lineage: born of both races but belonging to neither. Often underestimated by his opponents, D possesses surprising power and resourcefulness, having most of the strengths of the Nobility and only mild levels of their common weaknesses. It has been seen in both movies that his power is not only physical, but extends into the magical realm as well. His supernatural powers make him one of the strongest beings in the world: possibly the second strongest (after only his father). However, D prefers using his physical abilities, only using his magic in times of great need. Unlike most dhampirs, D is able to live as a "normal" human; however, he is marked by his unearthly beauty and exceptionally potent aura and thus rarely accepted by human settlements. In terms of weaknesses, he is randomly susceptible to sun-sickness, a severe type of sunstroke, about once every five years (far less than most dhampirs). D also recovers from it at a rate far greater than other dhampirs. Usually, it takes several days to recover from sunlight syndrome, longer if the dhampir is exceedingly powerful, but D recovered in a few hours (around 1–6 hours) despite being one of the strongest dhampirs alive. Otherwise, D does not appear to suffer from other vampiric weaknesses usual to dhampirs, being able to physically restrain opponents with his aura and having godlike reflexes surpassing even those of Nobles.

His symbiotic left hand states, in Vampire Hunter D: Bloodlust: "The Herarchy of us became impatient with the heartless David and impaled The Lord on 'The Sword'". Speculation on whether "The Sword" is D's sword or not is debatable. Here, however, the movie differs sharply from the book from which it takes its story, Vampire Hunter D: Demon Deathchase, and future entries in the novel series do not differentiate between Dracula, The Vampire King, The Sacred Ancestor and D's father, proposing that they are one and the same.

D rides a cybernetic horse, wields a crescent longsword which looks similar to Yoshitaka Amano's scimitar sword design found in many of his works of art, but the sword has a hefty length, similar to that of a Japanese nodachi. D always wears a mystical blue pendant; it prevents many of the automatic defenses (such as laser fields and small nuclear blasters) created by the Nobility in past millennia from working properly and allows him to enter their sealed castles. He also uses wooden needles in the novels and game, which he can throw with super speed. He protects his milk-white face from the noonday sun with long black hair, flowing black clothing and cape, and the shadow of a wide-brimmed hat. D appears to be a youth, 17 or 18 years old, though D's age is unknown (the novels reveal that he is more than 10,000 years old). His beauty is mesmerizing, often unintentionally wooing women and sometimes flustering men.

Very little is known of D's past, and the identity of his parents is ambiguous, but his innate power suggests that his father is an extraordinarily powerful vampire. Regarding D's birth, some Nobles whisper dark rumors about their vampire progenitor, the Sacred Ancestor known as Count Dracula, bedding a human woman called "Mina the Fair" (implied to be Mina Harker). Dracula conducted bizarre crossbreeding experiments involving himself and countless human women or even other vampires. The only successful product of the experiments is D, who wants nothing to do with his father except to kill him, even refusing to go by his true name, shortening it to just the first letter. In Twin Shadowed Knight, D has a twin who goes unnamed. The twin states that he and D were born from the same woman in exactly the same conditions.

=== Left Hand ===
Left Hand
- Vampire Hunter D character
- D's Left Hand as seen in Bloodlust
- First appearance: Vampire Hunter D; 1983
- Created by: Hideyuki Kikuchi
- Designed by: Yoshitaka Amano
- Voiced by: Japanese: Ichirō Nagai; English: Michael McConnohie (OVA; 1992 Streamline dub); Mike McShane (Bloodlust); John Hostetter (video game); Andy McAvin (OVA; 2015 Sentai dub); Terence Aselford (GraphicAudio dramas)

In-universe information
- Species: Countenanced Carbuncle
- Gender: Male

D is the host for a sentient symbiote, Left Hand, a wisecracking homunculus with a human face residing in his left palm, who can suck in massive amounts of matter through a wind void or vacuum tunnel. Left Hand enjoys needling the poker-faced D, but only appears as needed, rarely witnessed or heard by anyone other than D, yet aware of many of D's thoughts and actions. At all other times, D's left hand appears normal. Besides providing a contrast to D's reserved demeanor, Left Hand is incredibly useful, possessing many mysterious powers such as psychometry, inducing sleep, hypnotizing others, determining the medical condition of a victim, absorbing matter, energy, and even souls and magic, healing and reviving D and himself, and the ability to size up the supernatural powers or prowess of an enemy, even beyond D's keen senses. After absorbing four elements, Left Hand can use them to generate powerful attacks, regenerate D and himself, and to transform D into full vampire state rivaling Sacred Ancestor. Left Hand can store absorbed objects in a pocket dimension inside his stomach, and later spit them out.

In the first and second novels, Left Hand can also revive D when his physical condition is suffering, by consuming the four elements and converting the resulting energy into life force. This ability even saved D from the usually fatal for vampires stake through the heart he received from Rei-Ginsei in the first novel. Left Hand has its own mind and will, and acts as D's guide and sole permanent companion, providing a reservoir of knowledge pertaining to the lost Noble culture. So far, Left Hand's origins are unknown, and it is unclear how they came to be joined. However, some of its nature is revealed in the third book, which features a similar creature; it is implied he was one of the Barbarois (mutant/demon hybrids) who served in the personal retinue of the Sacred Ancestor, and was experimented on by him to increase his powers over other Barbarois.

=== Sacred Ancestor ===
The Sacred Ancestor's role in the novels is very mixed, appearing both as the bane and savior to isolated towns, and deified as a legendary god-king to the vampires, many of whom have never even met him in person. D quotes the Sacred Ancestor's precepts ("Transient guests are we"—implied to refer to the Nobility) in the first novel. The Sacred Ancestor appears both as a lawgiver honored for his intelligence, who showed some interest in preserving humans, and as a ruthless scientist (in the second novel), conducting hybrid breeding experiments with humans in order to perpetuate his own dwindling species. D appears to have encountered his alleged father on at least one occasion, as when at times D reaches a place where the imprint of the Sacred Ancestor's power remains, D remembers the Sacred Ancestor telling him that "You are my only success." Like D, the Sacred Ancestor is portrayed as a mysterious and handsome young wanderer who deals with both life and death. However, in the English dub of the anime, D states that the Sacred Ancestor respected humanity and did not feed on innocent people.

== Production ==
In the postscript of the first Vampire Hunter D novel, Hideyuki Kikuchi cited Hammer Films' Horror of Dracula (1958) as his first inspiration in horror. He also praised horror manga artist Osamu Kishimoto for his distinct style, that he described as "a gothic mood in the Western tradition". Kikuchi is famous for writing his manuscripts by hand. Having written the Vampire Hunter D series for 40 years, the author has previously admitted that he does not remember all of its mythology, only that of a couple of volumes, and therefore one might find some contradictions in it. Kikuchi explained that the two points he is always careful of are, not to "mix up the characteristics of D", and "not to lose sight of the purpose of the journey". When asked if the Sacred Ancestor will ever be given a larger role, Kikuchi said the character "will come out someday" and "When that happens, please expect that to be your warning that Vampire Hunter D is speeding toward an ending". The author has previously said that he has "a final conflict for D" in mind, but that final conflict will not be the entire ending of the series.

== Publication history ==
Beginning in January 1983, Kikuchi has written 41 Vampire Hunter D novels spanning 53 volumes as of April 2023. All of the publications in the series were published by Asahi Sonorama until the branch went out of business in September 2007. The release of D – Throng of Heretics in October 2007 under the Asahi Bunko – Sonorama Selection label marked the transition to the new publisher, Asahi Shimbun Publishing, a division of Asahi Sonorama's parent company. From December 2007 through January 2008, Asahi Shimbun Publishing reprinted the complete Vampire Hunter catalogue under the Sonorama Selection label.

On May 11, 2005, the first official English translation was released under DH Press, translated by Kevin Leahy. As of 2020, 24 novels have been published in English, spanning 29 volumes. In 2021, Dark Horse began releasing the series in an omnibus format. The first volume, featuring the first three novels, was released on October 27, 2021. In December 2021, Dark Horse Comics in partnership with GraphicAudio began publishing dramatized audiobook adaptations of the Vampire Hunter D novel series featuring a full English voice cast, soundtrack, and sound effects.

In January 2011, Hideyuki Kikuchi published the first spinoff set in the Vampire Hunter universe, a series of prequels titled Another Vampire Hunter: The Noble Greylancer (吸血鬼ハンター / アナザー 貴族グレイランサー, Vanpaia Hantā/Anazā: Kizoku Gureiransā), illustrated by Ayami Kojima, artist and character designer for the Castlevania series of video games. It takes place over 5,000 years before Vampire Hunter D and focuses on expanding the history of the Nobility, following the exploits of the vampire warrior Lord Greylancer. In 2013, Viz Media's Haikasoru imprint released the first official English translation of the prequel series, retitled Noble V: Greylancer, translated by Takami Nieda with newly commissioned cover artwork by Vincent Chong.

== Adaptations ==
=== Animation ===
==== Vampire Hunter D ====
Billed by the Japanese producers as a "dark future science-fiction romance," Vampire Hunter D is set in the year 12,090 AD, in a post-nuclear holocaust world where vampires, mutants and demons "slither through a world of darkness" (in the words of the film's opening introduction).

==== Vampire Hunter D: Bloodlust ====
The second film, Vampire Hunter D: Bloodlust garnered respect for its advanced animation techniques, detailed art style and character designs, voice acting originally recorded in English (English voice casting/direction by Jack Fletcher), and its sophisticated orchestral soundtrack composed, arranged and conducted by Marco D'Ambrosio. Its art style closely mirrored that of the illustrator and original character designer of the first movie, Yoshitaka Amano.

The storyline features a larger cast than the first film. The second Vampire Hunter D movie (known as Vampire Hunter D: Bloodlust outside of Japan) is based on the third of Hideyuki Kikuchi's Vampire Hunter D novels (Demon Deathchase in English). Unlike the first film, which was released in 1985, this movie is rated NC-16 in Singapore, M in Australia, 15 in the UK, R13 in New Zealand and R for violence/gore in the USA (except for the Blu-ray release, which is unrated).

==== Vampire Hunter D: Resurrection ====
In June 2015, a new animated series tentatively titled Vampire Hunter D: Resurrection was announced, produced by Unified Pictures and Digital Frontier. The series would be produced by Kurt Rauer and Scott McLean, and directed by Yoichi Mori, with Bloodlust director Yoshiaki Kawajiri acting as supervising director and series creator Hideyuki Kikuchi providing editorial supervision. The series was currently in pre-production, and is developed as an hour-long serial drama with the intent of being broadcast on a major American cable network or on-demand provider, with Japanese distribution to follow. As of June 2016 the series is still in pre-production, with plans to begin shipping the project to distributors by the end of the year. Given the abundance of source material, the current plan is to produce as many as seven seasons, without revisiting the source material that was adapted into the first two films. In February 2018 it was announced that the pilot episode would be written by Brandon M. Easton, writer for the Message from Mars comic book series. The first draft of the pilot was completed in October 2018. Pre-production on the series was put on hold in early 2020 as a result of the COVID-19 pandemic.

=== Audio ===
==== Audio Drama ====
Asashi Sonorama created audio drama adaptations of three of the novels, in five parts: Raiser of Gales "D" (January 1988), D – Demon Deathchase (June 1988), D – Mysterious Journey to the North Sea I: To the North Sea (March 1990), D – Mysterious Journey to the North Sea II: Summer at Last (May 1990), D – Mysterious Journey to the North Sea III: When Winter Comes Again (June 1990). Most of the voice cast for the original OVA reprised their roles. Originally released on cassette tape, in 2005 they were re-released as a special edition, five-disc Vampire Hunter D Audio Drama Box, including a small supplemental booklet with a new short story by Kikuchi and an "art cloth" with an illustration by Amano.

==== Graphic Audio ====
In December 2021, GraphicAudio launched an ongoing series of full-cast dramatized audiobook adaptations based on Hideyuki Kikuchi's Vampire Hunter D novel series. Produced with cinematic sound effects, original musical scores, and ensemble voice actors, the audio line adapts individual volumes from the franchise sequentially, with releases continuing through Volume 30 in 2026.

=== Comics and manga ===
==== Vampire Hunter D: American Wasteland ====
In July 2008, Devils Due Publishing announced that it had acquired the rights to publish an English-language Vampire Hunter D comic book mini-series titled Vampire Hunter D: American Wasteland, to be written by Jimmy Palmiotti and pencilled by Tim Seeley, however the project was cancelled in 2009. Intended to infuse the standard Vampire Hunter D formula and mythos with more Western sensibilities, it would have told an original story about D departing the Frontier to embark on a journey to a new land still ruled by the vampiric Nobility.

==== Hideyuki Kikuchi's Vampire Hunter D ====
In November 2007, the first volume of Saiko Takaki's manga adaptation of Hideyuki Kikuchi's series was published simultaneously in the U.S., Japan, and Europe. The project, overseen by Digital Manga Publishing and Hideyuki Kikuchi, aimed to adapt the entire catalogue of Vampire Hunter D novels into a manga form, however it had concluded after the eighth volume due in part to an injury affecting Takaki's ability to illustrate the series.

==== Vampire Hunter D: The Rose Princess ====
In July 2024, artist Saiko Takaki launched a new manga adaptation titled Vampire Hunter D: Rose Princess on Asahi Shimbun's Sonoroma+ web platform, adapting the ninth volume of Kikuchi's original novel series. Dark Horse Manga subsequently announced its acquisition of the English-language license at Anime NYC in August 2026, scheduling its physical and digital release for early 2027, translated by Kevin Leahy.

==== Vampire Hunter D: Message from Mars ====
On June 30, 2016, a Kickstarter crowdfunding campaign for a five-issue Vampire Hunter D comic book series titled Vampire Hunter D: Message from Mars was announced. Published by Stranger Comics with supervision from series creator Hideyuki Kikuchi and support from the creative teams at Unified Pictures and Digital Frontier, Message from Mars is an adaptation of the 2005 short story Message from Cecile and acts as a prequel to the then-in-development animated series. The series is written by Brandon M. Easton and illustrated by Michael Broussard, with visual development by Christopher Shy. The campaign's stretch goals also include an official Vampire Hunter D Pathfinder Roleplaying Game supplement written by F. Wesley Schneider. The campaign reached its $25,000 funding goal on July 1, 2016, and its initial $50,000 stretch goal on July 7, 2016. The campaign concluded on August 9, 2016, with 1,736 backers pledging a total of $107,025, reaching four out of five stretch goals.

Following the first issue the series was placed on temporary hiatus due to a serious medical emergency in Broussard's family, resuming production in early 2018 with new artists Ryan Benjamin and Richard Friend. As of December 2020 all production work for the five-issue run is complete, but publication plans were placed on an indefinite hiatus due to the ongoing COVID-19 pandemic. In December 2021 the completion of the project was announced via Kickstarter update, with limited publication planned to begin in 2022 following a recovery from pandemic conditions, to be followed by a wide retail and digital release in the future. The graphic novel Kickstarter campaign was launched on January 26, 2022, offering a limited hardcover collector's edition, variant cover single issue editions, and a digital edition. The campaign achieved its initial $30,000 funding goal within 90 minutes, and surpassed $100,000 within the first day, concluding on February 19, 2020, with 4,095 backers pledging a total of $445,205.

==== Untitled ongoing comic series ====
At WonderCon in March 2026, Unified Pictures announced a 20-issue ongoing comic book series adapting unadapted volumes of Hideyuki Kikuchi's Vampire Hunter D novels. Created in partnership with Kikuchi, the project features writing by Brandon Easton and artwork by Ryan Benjamin, continuing the creative team's collaboration following their work on the earlier Message from Mars miniseries. The series was originally slated to begin its rollout in summer 2026.

==== Vampire Hunter D: Fortress of Blood ====
Announced by Dark Horse Comics at Anime NYC in August 2026, Vampire Hunter D: Fortress of Blood is a 4-issue original comic miniseries featuring an overarching story concept by creator Hideyuki Kikuchi. Written by Chris Condon with artwork by Filipe Andrade and coloring by Jordie Bellaire, the series follows D as he crosses paths with a family of outcasts making a final stand at an old fortress against a marching vampire army. The first issue is scheduled for release on December 16, 2026, with the miniseries continuing its run into 2027.

=== Video games ===
==== Vampire Hunter D ====
A video game based on Vampire Hunter D Bloodlust was also made for the PlayStation game console, titled Vampire Hunter D. It is a survival horror game, but also similar to a standard adventure title. The player can see D from different pre-rendered angles throughout the game, and allow D to attack enemies with his sword. D can also use magic, Left Hand's abilities, and items. The story of the game is similar to that of Vampire Hunter D Bloodlust, although it takes place entirely within the castle as D fights all the enemies. Only two of the Barbarois mutants appear as enemies. There are three endings, one of which is similar to the end of the anime.

== Reception ==
By 2008, the Vampire Hunter D novels had sold over 17 million copies worldwide, making it one of the best-selling book series in history. Theron Martin of Anime News Network called the first novel "a competent vampire-hunting story with enough strong points to balance out its weaknesses" and gave it a B rating. He praised the setting as a wholly credible world ruled by vampires and grounded in science fiction, rather than fantasy or the supernatural. However, he called the plotting "fairly rudimentary" and a standard tale of a hero and heroine struggling against colorful opposition coming from different directions, where even the few twists are hardly unique. While Martin praised the characters of Doris and Rei-Ginsei, he criticized D and Count Magnus Lee as having weak characterizations. His colleague Rebecca Silverman also strongly praised the world and setting of the first three Vampire Hunter D novels, finding it to clearly be a post-apocalyptic "version of our reality" that in many ways is just as much a character as D. She wrote that the books are "practically dripping with atmosphere" as the story's descriptions are florid and detailed. In her four out of five stars review, Silverman did note that the series could sometimes feel melodramatic and criticized most of the heroines as "outdated." Reviewing the first three novels for Anime UK News, Ian Wolf gave the series an 8/10 rating and wrote "Vampire Hunter D is an entertaining read, mixing elements of many different genres to create something very different from what is often available." He noted that D's Left Hand adds some comedy to the overall dark tone of the series.

== See also ==
- Vampire literature
- Vampire film
