= Thumbelina: A Magical Story =

Japanese anime television series

おやゆび姫物語 (Oyayubi Hime Monogatari)
- Genre: Adventure, fantasy
- Anime television series
- Directed by: Hiromitsu Morita
- Produced by: Ippei Onimaru
- Written by: Akiyoshi Sakai
- Music by: Kouji Murakami
- Studio: Enoki Films; Märchen-Sha (animation)
- Licensed by: US: Starmaker Entertainment, Digiview Entertainment
- Original network: TV Tokyo
- Original run: September 30, 1992 – March 31, 1993
- Episodes: 26

Thumbelina: A Magical Story (おやゆび姫物語, Oyayubi Hime Monogatari; lit. The Story of the Thumb-Princess) is a Japanese anime series produced by Enoki Films and adapted from the original 1835 Hans Christian Andersen fairy tale Thumbelina by Akiyoshi Sakai. It premiered in Japan on TV Tokyo on September 30, 1992, and ran for twenty-six episodes until its conclusion on March 31, 1993.

The series was edited into an eighty-minute film and released in North America on VHS by Starmaker Entertainment in 1993. In 2006, Digiview Entertainment re-released the Starmaker film to DVD.

== Plot ==
Unable to control her mischievous tomboyish young daughter Maya, an exhausted mother seeks the guidance of an old witch living on the edge of town. The witch gives this mother a magical copy of the fairy tale Thumbelina and tells her to read this to Maya.

Later, when her mother falls asleep, Maya shrinks and is pulled inside the world of the book. A good witch appears and tells her that she is in her mother's dream world and that in order to return to normal, she must find a way to wake up her mother. To do this, she must travel to a faraway southern land meet to the Crystal Prince, who will help her reach home.

During her journey Maya faces many trials and hardships; along the way she befriends members of the dream world, who band together to help her reach the land of the South.

== Cast ==
Character	Original	English (uncredited)
Maya Garrison/Māya	Mika Kanai	Patricia Parris
Mrs. Garrison (Maya's Mom)/Mama	Yōko Asagami	Mona Marshall
Noble/Nobo	Fushigi Yamada	Mona Marshall
Hoppy/Kerota	Mami Matsui	Barbara Goodson
Gladys (Hoppy's Mom/George's Wife)/Gamako	Noriko Uemura	Barbara Goodson
George (Hoppy's Dad)/Gerozu	Toshiya Ueda	Jan Rabson
Enzerā	Satoko Munakata	Mona Marshall
Herūra	Yōko Asagami	Mona Marshall
Pixie/Poppu	Eiko Yamada	Mona Marshall
Croven/Zobiru	Yokoo Mari	Barbara Goodson
Aunt Ruth/Rōzumarīmausu	Masako Nozawa	Chelsea Terry
Swallow/Tsubame Tori	Hikaru Midorikawa	Doug Stone
Rat/Nezumi	Issei Futamata	Doug Stone
Turtle/Kame	Katsumi Suzuki	Doug Stone
Crystal Prince	Akira Ishida	Jan Rabson
Shadow Prince	Nobutoshi Hayashi	Jan Rabson
Narrator	Yōko Asagami	Jan Rabson

=== Additional voices ===
- Chelsea Terry
- Ryann Ashley
- Noel Johnson
- Pierce Walker
- Brandon Garrison
- Tyrone Rodriguez
- Clinton Rodriguez

Uncredited

- Barbara Goodson – The Human Witch and Bridesmaid #2
- Mona Marshall – The Frog Witch, Bridesmaid #1 and Bridesmaid #3
- Jan Rabson – Hobbit #2
- Doug Stone – Insect, Sea Creature, Hobbit #1 and Hobbit #3

== Media ==
Produced by Enoki Films and adapted from the original Hans Christian Andersen fairy tale Thumbelina by Akiyoshi Sakai, it premiered in Japan on TV Tokyo on September 30, 1992, and ran for twenty-six episodes until its conclusion on March 31, 1993.

The series was licensed for release in North America by Starmaker Entertainment, which released the series to VHS format under the name Thumbelina on December 16, 1993. The Starmaker release was heavily edited, with director Jim Terry reducing the series to an eighty-minute film. Digiview Entertainment re-released the Starmaker version to Region 1 DVD as Thumbelina: A Magical Story on May 9, 2006. The full series is also licensed for regional language releases in Colombia by Centauro Comunicaciones and in Italy by Italia 1 which broadcast the Italian dub on its channel.

The series uses two pieces of theme music, one opening and one ending theme, both performed by Yuki Matsura. The opening theme is "Welcome to the Planetarium" (プラネタリウムにようこそ) while the ending theme is "Whistling of the Hills" (口笛の丘).

=== Episode list ===
No.	Title	Original release date
1	"Wake Up, Mama" "Mama, me o Samashi te!" (ママ、目を覚まして!)	September 30, 1992
2	"Goodbye, Happy Tree" "Sayonara Happii Tsurii" (さよならハッピーツリー)	October 7, 1992
3	"Wonderful Town Underneath the Umbrella" "Kasa no Shita no Fushigi na Machi" (傘の下の不思議な町)	October 14, 1992
4	"Don't Give up Walking Billy" "Ganbare, Yowamushi Birii" (がんばれ、弱虫ビリー)	October 21, 1992
5	"Bride of a Frog" "Kaeru no Hanayome San" (カエルの花嫁さん)	October 28, 1992
6	"Mama of the Magic Castle" "Mahou Jou no Mama" (魔法城のママ)	November 4, 1992
7	"Maya Embarks on a Flying Ship" "Māya. Sora Tobu Fune ni Noru" (マーヤ·空飛ぶ船にのる)	November 11, 1992
8	"Welcome to Nozomite Town" "Nozomitetaun he Youkoso" (ノゾミテタウンへようこそ)	November 18, 1992
9	"Mysterious Magician" "Nazo no Majutsu Shi" (謎の魔術師)	November 25, 1992
10	"Mirage Lighthouse" "Shinkirou no Toudai" (蜃気楼の燈台)	December 2, 1992
11	"Maya's Magic Watch" "Māya to Mahou no Tokei" (マーヤと魔法の時計)	December 9, 1992
12	"Crystal Prince from a Southern Land" "Minami no Kuni no Suishou Ouji" (南の国の水晶王子)	December 16, 1992
13	"Dragon of Flower Light" "Hana to Hikari no Doragon" (花と光のドラゴン)	December 23, 1992
14	"Maya the Goddess" "Megami ni Natta Māya" (女神になったマーヤ)	January 6, 1993
15	"Nostalgic Reunion" "Natsukashii Saikai" (懐かしい再会)	January 13, 1993
16	"Trapped in the Mole Tunnel" "Mogura Tonneru no Wana" (モグラトンネルの罠)	January 20, 1993
17	"Crooked Proposition" "Damasa re ta Puropoozu" (だまされたプロポーズ)	January 27, 1993
18	"Maya's Wedding" "Māya no Kekkonshiki" (マーヤの結婚式)	February 3, 1993
19	"Journey of the Three" "San nin no Tabidachi" (三人の旅立ち)	February 10, 1993
20	"Firefly Cape" "Hotaru no Misaki" (ホタルの岬)	February 17, 1993
21	"Hans and the bell Inlet" "Kagami no Irie to Hansu" (鏡の入江とハンス)	February 24, 1993
22	"Secret of the Crystal Castle" "Suishou Jou no Himitsu" (水晶城の秘密)	March 3, 1993
23	"You Awake Now Mama?" "Me ga Same ta no, Mama?" (目が覚めたの、ママ?)	March 10, 1993
24	"I Won't Let You Cross the River" "Sono Kawa ha Watara se Nai" (その河は渡らせない)	March 17, 1993
25	"Helula's Last Battle" "Herūra Saigo no Tatakai" (ヘルーラ最後の戦い)	March 24, 1993
26	"I'm Back, Mama" "Tadaima, Mama" (ただいま、ママ)	March 31, 1993
