= Magne Robo Gakeen =

Japanese anime television series

- マグネロボ・ガ・キーン
- Genre: Mecha
- Director: Tomoharu Katsumata
- Music: Michiaki Watanabe
- Country of origin: Japan
- Original language: Japanese
- No. of episodes: 39

Production
- Producers: Takehito Goto (TV Asahi); Hirofumi Shiozawa (Japad)
- Production companies: NET/TV Asahi; Toei Animation; Japad

Original release
- Network: ANN (NET/TV Asahi)
- Release: September 5, 1976 – June 26, 1977

Magne Robo Gakeen (マグネロボ・ガ・キーン, Magunerobo Ga Kiin) is a Japanese anime television series produced by Toei Animation. It is the third installment to Takara's Magne-Robo franchise. It aired from TV Asahi from September 5, 1976, to June 26, 1977, with a total of 39 episodes. Outside Japan, several episodes were edited by Collins Walker and cobbled together into a movie-length feature produced by International Media Group and released by Century Video Corporation (The Adventures of Pinocchio), and in this format it is also known as Magnos the Robot or Renegade Force.

== Story ==
Doctor Kazuki, who perceived of an invasion of Earth by the Izar people builds a robot based on the science of magnetism and sphere joint theory. Undergoing a dangerous augmentation process, Doctor Kazuki's daughter Mai becomes the pilot of "Mighty" or "Magnetman Minus". Takeru Hojo becomes the pilot of "Plyzer" or "Magnetman Plus". The pilots would hold each other and then physically transform their joint bodies in a metallic plate locking itself on the Gakeen (Short for "Gathering Keen") robot's frame thus enabling the super robot to move and fight.

== Concept ==
Gakeen became one of the many super robot series to appear after the seminal works such as Mazinger and Getter Robo opened the floodgates to the genre. The robot was notable for its creative weaponry systems such as cutting fists, Gakeen fists, steel claws, bladed foot. Other specialties include magnetic onslaught, magnetic draw, arm cutter, laser beams, atomic hurricane. The show further extended the transformation into very long complex sequences that would become trendy for similar shows to follow.

== Characters ==
- Takeru Hojo
  Toshio Furukawa
- Mai Kazuki
  Kazuko Sugiyama

== Staff ==
- Creator
  Shinobu Urakawa
- Director
  Tomoharu Katsumata
- Music
  Michiaki Watanabe
- Character design
  Kazuo Komatsubara
- Mechanical design
  Tadanao Tsuji
- Singer
  Ichirou Mizuki
  Mitsuko Horie

== DVD ==
In Japan, it has been released as a DVD box set. Outside Japan, it was released on an edited 90-minute film DVD by Liberty International Entertainment. In Italy the series has been released on the home video market by Yamato Video who presented the whole series since only the first part was broadcast during the 1980s by local TV networks; the second half has a different voice cast.

== Merchandise ==
Takara released the rare Robotman Gakeen in 1976. The toy was released as part of the Robotman Series, which was originally intended to be the bridge between Microman and Henshin Cyborg series to form a larger toy tie-in project called Victory Series. When Henshin Cyborg line was terminated in 1974 however, there was no longer a reason for keeping the Victory Series and Robotman then became part of Microman line.

CM's Corporation then released a Brave Gokin version of Gakeen in September 2008.
