= Kaneto Shiozawa =

Japanese actor, voice actor and narrator (1954–2000)

- 塩沢 兼人
- Born: Toshikazu Shiozawa; January 28, 1954; Tokyo, Japan
- Died: May 10, 2000 (aged 46); Shinjuku, Tokyo, Japan
- Occupations: Actor; voice actor; narrator
- Years active: 1975–2000
- Agent: Aoni Production
- Spouse: Harumi Baba

Toshikazu Shiozawa (Japanese: 塩沢 敏一, romanized: Shiozawa Toshikazu, January 28, 1954 – May 10, 2000), better known by the stage name Kaneto Shiozawa (Japanese: 塩沢 兼人, romanized: Shiozawa Kaneto), was a Japanese actor, voice actor and narrator from Tokyo. At the time of his death, he was attached to Aoni Production. He had a distinctive calm, aristocratic-sounding voice, which often typecast him as villainous or anti-heroic strategists and intellectuals. His stage name originated from the Japanese director Kaneto Shindō. He was best known for his performances as Rei in Fist of the North Star, M'Quve in Mobile Suit Gundam, Buriburizaemon in Crayon Shin-chan, D in Vampire Hunter D, Cyborg Ninja in Metal Gear, Paul von Oberstein in Legend of the Galactic Heroes, Devimon in Digimon, Prince Demande in Sailor Moon, Vega in Street Fighter, R. Ichiro Tanaka in Kyūkyoku Chōjin R, Inspector Ninzaburo Shiratori in Detective Conan, Zato-1 in Guilty Gear, Hyo Imawano in Rival Schools and Luke Skywalker in Star Wars.

== Life and career ==
Shiozawa graduated from Nihon University Second Senior High School, where he learned to perform in its art department.

== Death ==
On May 9, 2000, at 4pm, Shiozawa fell down the stairs of his home in Shinjuku, Tokyo, claiming that there were no injuries found on him, he insisted that he was fine. Six hours later, at 10pm, Shiozawa's body condition suddenly changed, he collapsed and was rushed to the Tokyo Medical University Hospital; he died of a cerebral contusion at 12am on May 10, at the age of 46. Fellow voice actor Hidekatsu Shibata was one of the attendees at his funeral. Shiozawa's ongoing roles were replaced by other voice actors after his death.

Hikaru Midorikawa said, "Kaneto Shiozawa was my hero."

Due to his death, two of the characters he played (Zato-1 from Guilty Gear and Hyo from Rival Schools) were killed off in-universe. Zato-1 was replaced by the shadow parasite Eddie (voiced by Takehito Koyasu), who took over Zato's body following his death until Guilty Gear Xrd.

In 2016, a well-known voice actor, Hiroshi Kamiya, has permanently taken over the role for Buriburizaemon from Crayon Shin-chan, after being remained silent for 16 years, due to Shiozawa's death.

== Voice roles ==
=== Anime television ===
| Year | Title | Role | Note |
|---|---|---|---|
| 1975 | Ikkyū-san | Sadaaki | |
| 1977 | Ippatsu Kanta-kun | Jiro | |
| 1979 | Mobile Suit Gundam | M'Quve, Omur Fang, Job John | |
| 1980 | Space Runaway Ideon | Joliver Ira | |
| 1980 | Space Warrior Baldios | Marin Reigan | |
| 1981 | Galaxy Cyclone Braiger | Blaster Kid | |
| 1981 | GoShogun | Leonardo Medici Bundle | |
| 1982 | Galactic Gale Baxinger | Billy the Shot | |
| 1983 | Ai Shite Knight | Eiji Tono | |
| 1983 | Mirai Keisatsu Urashiman | Adolf von Ludwig | |
| 1983 | Sasuraiger | Rock Anlock | |
| 1984 | Adventures of the Little Koala | Weather | |
| 1984 | Fist of the North Star | Rei | |
| 1984 | Kinnikuman | Geronimo, Screw Kid | |
| 1985 | Dancouga – Super Beast Machine God | Ryō Shiba | |
| 1985 | High School! Kimengumi | Dai Monohoshi | |
| 1986 | Dragon Ball | Namu, Tenron | |
| 1986 | Saint Seiya | Aries Mu, Ankoku Andromeda | |
| 1987 | City Hunter | Wakagashira | |
| 1988 | Soreike! Anpanman | Hamigakiman | |
| 1988 | Transformers: Super-God Masterforce | Road King | |
| 1990 | Nadia: The Secret of Blue Water | Emperor Neo | |
| 1991 | Dororonpa! | Archangel Michael (大天使ミカエル) | |
| 1992 | Boyfriend | Masao Takatō | |
| 1993 | Art of Fighting | John Crawley | |
| 1993 | Miracle Girls | Hideaki Kurashige | |
| 1993 | Pretty Soldier Sailor Moon | Prince Demande | |
| 1994 | Crayon Shin-chan | Buriburi Zaemon | |
| 1995 | Street Fighter II V | Balrog Fabio La Cerda | |
| 1996 | The Vision of Escaflowne | Zongi | |
| 1997 | Dragon Ball GT | Eis Shenron | |
| 1997 | Mach GoGoGo | Handler | |
| 1998 | Legend of Basara | Ageha | |
| 1998 | Flame of Recca | Magensha | |
| 1998 | Silent Möbius | Ganossa Maximillian | |
| 1998 | Weiß Kreuz | Kikyo | |
| 1998 | Yu-Gi-Oh! | Shadi | |
| 1999 | Detective Conan | Inspector Ninzaburo Shiratori | |
| 1999 | Chiisana Kyojin Microman | Demon Green | |
| 1999 | Crest of the Stars | Dusanyu | |
| 1999 | Digimon Adventure | Devimon | |
| 2000 | Banner of the Stars | Dusanyu | |
| 2000 | Gate Keepers | Yasutaka | |
| 2001 | Banner of the Stars II | Dusanyu | Archive Recording |

=== OVA ===
| Year | Title | Role |
|---|---|---|
| 1984 | Birth | Kim |
| 1985 | Area 88 | Shin Kazama |
| 1985 | Megazone 23 - Part I | B.D. |
| 1985 | Vampire Hunter D | D |
| 1986 | Blue Comet SPT Layzner | Ru Kain |
| 1986 | Megazone 23 - Part II | B.D. |
| 1987 | Bubblegum Crisis | J.B. Gibson |
| 1987 | Kaze to Ki no Uta: Sanctus -Sei naru kana- | Auguste Beau |
| 1987 | To-y | Tōi "To-y" Fujii |
| 1988 | Bride of Deimos | Kaname Ōba |
| 1988 | Hades Project Zeorymer | Saiga |
| 1988 | Legend of the Galactic Heroes | Paul Von Oberstein |
| 1988 | Vampire Princess Miyu | Larva |
| 1989 | Blood Reign: Curse of the Yoma | Marou |
| 1989 | ARIEL Visual | Hauser |
| 1989 | Earthian | Dr. Ashino (Professor Ashiya) |
| 1989 | Fūma no Kojirō | Yōsui |
| 1990 | Aries | Zeus |
| 1990 | Cyber City Oedo 808 | Merill "Benten" Yanagawa |
| 1990 | Transformers: Zone | Sonic Bomber |
| 1991 | ARIEL Deluxe | Hauser |
| 1991 | Kyūkyoku Chōjin R | R. Ichiro Tanaka |
| 1992 | Ai no Kusabi | Iason Mink |
| 1993 | The Heroic Legend of Arslan | Narcasse |
| 1994 | Baki the Grappler | Shinogi Koushou |
| 1994 | Phantom Quest Corp. | Nakasugi |
| 1997 | Agent Aika | Rudolf Hagen |
| 1998 | Twilight of the Dark Master | Kudo |
| 2000 | Angelique: Shiroi Tsubasa no Memoire | Clavis |

=== Films ===
| Year | Title | Role |
|---|---|---|
| 1980 | Phoenix 2722 | Godo |
| 1981 | Mobile Suit Gundam | Omur Fang |
| 1981 | Mobile Suit Gundam: Soldiers of Sorrow | M'Quve |
| 1982 | Mobile Suit Gundam: Encounters in Space | M'Quve |
| 1983 | Genma Taisen | Shirō Eda |
| 1984 | The Star of Cottonland | Nekomania |
| 1985 | The Dagger of Kamui | Shingo |
| 1985 | Kinnikuman: Counterattack! The Underground Space Choujins | Geronimo |
| 1985 | Kinnikuman: Hour of Triumph! Seigi Choujin | Geronimo |
| 1986 | Fist of the North Star | Rei |
| 1986 | Crisis in New York! | Geronimo |
| 1986 | Seigi Choujin vs. Senshi Choujin | Geronimo |
| 1987 | Bats & Terry | Terry |
| 1987 | Lupin III: The Plot of the Fuma Clan/Lupin III: The Fuma Conspiracy | Goemon Ishikawa XIII |
| 1988 | Urusei Yatsura Movie 5: Kanketsuhen (The Final Chapter) | Rupa |
| 1989 | HYPER-PSYCHIC-GEO GARAGA | Randy |
| 1989 | Saint Seiya: Warriors of the Final Holy Battle | Mu |
| 1990 | Carol | Clark |
| 1991 | Ranma ½: The Battle of Nekonron, China! A Battle to Defy the Rules! | Kirin |
| 1994 | Crayon Shin-chan: The Secret Treasure of Buri Buri Kingdom | Saari |
| 1994 | Street Fighter II: The Animated Movie | Vega |
| 1996 | Doraemon: Nobita and the Galaxy Super-express | Baum |
| 1996 | Crayon Shin-chan: Adventure in Henderland | Buriburizaemon |
| 1997 | Doraemon: Nobita and the Spiral City | Thomas Mejison |
| 1997 | Case Closed: The Time Bombed Skyscraper | Detective Ninzaburo Shiratori/Ninzaburo Santos |
| 1997 | Crayon Shin-chan: Pursuit of the Balls of Darkness | Tsuyoshi/Lavender |
| 1998 | Case Closed: The Fourteenth Target | Detective Ninzaburo Shiratori/Ninzaburo Santos |
| 1998 | Crayon Shin-chan: Blitzkrieg! Pig's Hoof's Secret Mission | Buriburizaemon |
| 1999 | Case Closed: The Last Wizard of the Century | Inspector Ninzaburo Shiratori/Ninzaburo Santos |
| 1999 | Crayon Shin-chan: Explosion! The Hot Spring's Feel Good Final Battle | Buriburi Zaemon |
| 2000 | Case Closed: Captured in Her Eyes | Inspector Ninzaburo Shiratori/Ninzaburo Santos |

=== Video games ===
- Battle Arena Toshinden series as Duke Rambert
- Black/Matrix as Gaius
- Dragoon Might as Yamato, Tekkamen and Ryan
- Dragon Knight II as Narrator
- Dragon Knight IV as Angus, Lucifon and Necromancer
- Double Dragon (Neo-Geo) as Jimmy Lee and Amon
- Down Load as Syd
- Exile series as Sadler
- Farland Story: Yottsu no Fuuin as Diva
- Guilty Gear series as Zato-1, Dr. Baldhead
- Hokuto No Ken: Seikimatsu Kyūseishu Densetsu as Rei
- Kessen as Ōtani Yoshitsugu
- Langrisser series as Böser/Paul
- Last Bronx as Joe Inagaki
- Legend of Dragoon as Melbu Frahma
- Magic School Lunar! as Memphis
- Metal Gear Solid as Gray Fox
- Metal Gear Solid 2: Sons of Liberty as Cyborg Ninja (archived recordings)
- Policenauts as Tony Redwood
- Puyo Puyo (PC Engine version) as Mummy
- Rival Schools series as Hyo Imawano
- Silent Bomber as Benoit
- Snatcher as Randam Hajile, Elijah Madnar and Ivan Rodriguez
- Street Fighter EX series as Kairi and Vega
- Strider Hiryu (1994 PC Engine version) as Strider Hiryu
- Tales of Phantasia (Super Famicom and PlayStation versions) as Dhaos
- Valis IV (PC Engine version) as Galgear

=== Dubbing ===
- Das Boot (1983 Fuji TV edition) - Fähnrich Ullmann (Martin May)
- Edward Scissorhands - Edward Scissorhands (Johnny Depp)
- Freejack - Alex Furlong (Emilio Estevez)
- Labyrinth - Jareth (David Bowie)
- Q&A - ADA Al Reilly (Timothy Hutton)
- The Rose - Huston Dyer (Frederic Forrest)
- Star Wars (1992 TV Asahi edition) - Luke Skywalker (Mark Hamill)
- Teenage Mutant Ninja Turtles (VHS releases) - Raphael
- UHF - George Newman ("Weird Al" Yankovic)
- Watership Down - Silver
- West Side Story (1990 TBS edition) - Riff (Russ Tamblyn)

=== Tokusatsu ===
- 1995: Chouriki Sentai Ohranger as Bara Brain
- 1996: B-Fighter Kabuto as Deep Sea Fish-man Dezzle / Dezzle the Great
- 1998: Seijuu Sentai Gingaman as Dark Merchant Biznella / Majin Biznella

=== Drama CD ===
- 110 Ban wa Koi no Hajimari series 1: 110 Ban wa Koi no Hajimari as Kousuki Shinoda
- Abunai series 3: Abunai Bara to Yuri no Sono as Reiji Segawa
- Abunai series 5: Abunai Shiawase Chou Bangaihen as Reiji Segawa & Fuyuomi Oosawa
- Ai no Kusabi series 1 as Iason
- Ai no Kusabi series 2: Dark Erogenous as Iason
- Analyst no Yuutsu series 1: Benchmark ni Koi wo Shite as Isao Washizaki
- Angel Sanctuary as Sevothtarte (first voice)
- Boxer Wa Inu Ni Naru series 1: Boxer Wa Inu Ni Naru as Cain
- Boxer Wa Inu Ni Naru series 2: Doctor Wa Inu wo Kau as Cain
- Boxer Wa Inu Ni Naru series 4: Akuta Wa Inu wo Enjiru as Cain
- Chougonka ~Song of Eternal Hatred~ as Benten
- Hanashizu no Utage as Shinobu Fujishiro
- Kinkanshoku as Kart
- Koi no Shinsatsushitsu as Souhei Hoshina
- Kyūkyoku Chōjin R as R. Ichiro Tanaka
- La Vie En Rose as Noboru Ootori
- Lesson XX as Masato
- Mirage of Blaze series 3: Konoyoruni Tsubasa wo as Terumoto Mouri
- My Codename is Charmer as Makoto Hasegawa
- Que Sera, Sera as Shuuichirou Himuro
- Romantist Taste as Asafumi Aoyama
- Stanley Hawk no Jikenbo ~AMBIVALENCE . Katto~ as Misao Jin
- The Dark Blue as Olivier Sheridan
- Street Fighter EX Drama CD as Kairi

=== Other roles ===
- Sotsugyou M as Kawazoe Haruka
