= Vampire Hunter D: American Wasteland =

- Artwork for the cover of Vampire Hunter D: American Wasteland (Devil's Due Publishing); Art by Tim Seeley

Publication information
- Publisher: Devil's Due Publishing
- Schedule: Originally to have been 6 in series
- Format: Limited series
- Genre: Horror
- Publication date: Cancelled

Creative team
- Written by: Jimmy Palmiotti
- Artist: Tim Seeley

Vampire Hunter D: American Wasteland is a comic book mini-series based on the popular Vampire Hunter D franchise, set to be published by Devil's Due Publishing. The series was announced in July 2008, but was confirmed to be cancelled at the 2009 Long Beach Comic Con, as a result of creative differences between Devil's Due and the license holders. The story would have followed the typical Vampire Hunter D set-up and remained true to the mythos, but with a "noticeably North American feel." It was to be written by Jimmy Palmiotti.

== Story ==
The plot of American Wasteland was for the first time to see the titular Vampire Hunter D arrive on the shores of America, a land where the vampiric Nobility persists, uninterrupted by those who seek to destroy them. There, D would have embarked on a journey inland while bringing their menace to an end.
