= Vampire Hunter D: Raiser of Gales =

1984 novel by Hideyuki Kikuchi

- Cover of the English edition of Vampire Hunter D: Raiser of Gales
- Author: Hideyuki Kikuchi
- Original title: Raiser of Gales "D" (風立ちて"D", Kaze Tachite "D")
- Translator: Kevin Leahy
- Illustrator: Yoshitaka Amano
- Language: Japanese
- Series: Vampire Hunter D Vol. 2
- Genre: Science fiction; Fantasy; Light novel
- Published: 1984 (Asahi Sonorama, JP); 2005 (DH Press, USA)
- Publication place: Japan
- Media type: Print (Paperback)
- Pages: 300 (USA); 254 (JP)
- ISBN: 1-59582-014-0 (USA); 4-257-76274-8 (JP)
- Preceded by: Vampire Hunter D
- Followed by: Demon Deathchase

Vampire Hunter D: Raiser of Gales is a Japanese novel by Hideyuki Kikuchi. Part of the Vampire Hunter D series, it was first published in Japan in 1984, was published in English in 2005.

== Book description ==
"The first rule of vampires is that the undead cannot walk in the daylight... or can they?"

The people of the village of Tepes once cowered in fear beneath the shadow of the manor of the Nobility. But the Nobility moved on, and the castle sat empty, a place whispered of in ghost stories to caution young people to stay away. One day four of the village children vanished. Only three returned, with no memory of what happened or where they went.

That was ten years ago. Now, in the year 12,090 A.D., vampires who can walk in the daylight have appeared. Did the disappearance of the children have something to do with the undead's newfound powers? Only the vampire hunter known as D can solve the mystery... but the answer may be more horrible than any can imagine.

== Adaptations ==
- Manga: Hideyuki Kikuchi's Vampire Hunter D Vol. 2
