= Eskimo dog =

Eskimo dog might refer to:

- A dog owned by a person of Eskimo (Yupik, Inuit or Aleut) ancestry
- Any Arctic sled dog type, long haired dogs used for pulling sleds
- Canadian Eskimo Dog, a selectively bred dog breed registered with the Canadian Kennel Club
- American Eskimo Dog, a breed of companion dog originating in Germany
- Greenland Dog, also known as Esquimaux Dog
