= J9 Series =

Japanese anime television series

The J9 Series (J9シリーズ, Jei Nain Shirīzu) is a trilogy of Japanese Super Robot mecha anime television series. The anime were broadcast by TV Tokyo (TX Network) from 1981 to 1984, the 1980s trilogy was produced and animated by Kokusai Eiga-sha (Movie International Company). In 2014, a fourth series was announced to be in production for a 2016 release, with the original creative and production team reunited after 30 years. However the project was cancelled in 2019 following the death of its intended showrunner, Yu Yamamoto.

== Shared concept ==
Each of the anime broadcast featured a team of robot pilots variably known as "J9", whose role changed from series to series. Each was also advertised as being the "robot anime version" of another popular fictional motif. In each series, the cast of heroes were voiced by Kazuyuki Sogabe, Kaneto Shiozawa, Katsuji Mori, and Yōko Asagami.

Yū Yamamoto was head screenwriter for all three series, and Masayuki Yamamoto composed the theme songs for the trilogy, as well. Music was also an overarching motif in the series, with the eyecatch always featuring the team leader playing some sort of musical instrument (Blaster Kid and a double-neck electric guitar in Braiger, Billy the Shot and a keytar in Baxinger, and Nukiuchi Rock and a harmonica in Sasuraiger).

Yū Yamamoto later revealed that he had named the series after Sony's flagship SL-J9 Betamax video player, which at the time was out of his price range.

== Series ==
- Galaxy Cyclone Braiger (銀河旋風ブライガー, Ginga Senpū Buraigā): Broadcast from October 1981 to June 1982, it drew inspiration from TV Asahi's Hissatsu franchise of jidaigeki. In the year 2111, Team Cosmoranger J9, with their giant robot Braiger which transforms from a flying car, protects the Solar System from different criminal syndicates that the police cannot handle, and must stop the leader of Nubia, Khamen Khamen, from succeeding in his plans in destroying Jupiter to create 30 new planets, which as a result would destroy the Earth.
- Galactic Gale Baxingar (銀河烈風バクシンガー, Ginga Reppū Bakushingā): Broadcast from July 1982 to March 1983, it drew inspiration from the popular fiction surrounding the Shinsengumi. In the year 2711 (600 years after the events of Braiger and the destruction of Jupiter), the Solar System is mostly peaceful under the Bakufu government, but it remains lawless. The J9-II team is formed to protect the peace of this new era using their giant robot Baxingar that transforms from cosmic motorcycles.
- Galactic Whirlwind Sasuraiger (銀河疾風サスライガー, Ginga Shippū Sasuraigā): Broadcast from April 1983 to January 1984, it drew inspiration from Around the World in Eighty Days. In the year 2911 (200 years after the events of Baxingar), a gambler makes a bet with a criminal syndicate boss that the now 50 planets of the Solar System can be each be visited within a year. He then forms the JJ9 team to travel the Solar System on a space train for the bet, fighting the syndicate's minions with their robot Sasuraiger.
- Galaxy Divine Wind Jinraiger (銀河神風ジンライガー, Ginga Jinpū Jinraigā): This series was planned for broadcast in 2016, and would have taken inspiration from the classic Chinese literary work Water Margin. Yū Yamamoto and Masauki Yamamoto had already wrote and composed the series' theme song and were in the process of auditioning the cast and the theme song singer. Yū Yamamoto stated that he wished to bring back "original anime", as in having no manga (or video game) to base it off of, as he believed this practice of adapting from a manga is detrimental to new screenwriters. It was also intended to be canonically unrelated to the original trilogy, but would have had a certain "J9 taste" to it. Characters for Jinraiger were designed by artist Kanhou Murase. Following the death of Yamamoto, the project was cancelled in 2019.

== Broadcast in other countries ==
- Italy: Rai 2
