= Vampire Hunter D (novel) =

Book by Hideyuki Kikuchi

Vampire Hunter D Volume 1
- First edition cover
- Author: Hideyuki Kikuchi
- Original title: 吸血鬼ハンター"D"
- Translator: Kevin Leahy
- Illustrator: Yoshitaka Amano
- Language: Japanese
- Series: Vampire Hunter D
- Genre: Science fiction, Fantasy
- Publisher: Asahi Sonorama
- Publication date: January 1983
- Publication place: Japan
- English publication date: 2005
- Media type: Print (Paperback)
- Pages: 282
- ISBN: 4-257-76225-X
- Followed by: Raiser of Gales

Vampire Hunter D (Japanese: 吸血鬼(バンパイア)ハンター"D", Hepburn: Banpaia Hantā Dī) is a novel written by Japanese author Hideyuki Kikuchi. It was published in Japan in January 1983 by Asahi Sonorama, and was first translated into English in 2005 by DH Press.

== Plot ==
It is the year 12,090 A.D. The world is ravaged in a firestorm of man's wars and madness. But from the wreckage, a few humans manage to survive, alongside something else.

Doris Lang knew what her fate would be when the vampire lord Count Magnus Lee bit her: an agonizing transformation into one of the undead, doomed to be stalked by her fellow villagers or cursed to become the bride of the unholy creature and face an eternity of torment, driven by the thirst for human blood. There was but one option left, and as she watched him ride in from the distance she knew there was hope. Salvation... from a vampire hunter named D.

Magnus has his own problems. His beautiful daughter Larmica refuses to let a human into her family. Enlisting the help of Garo, a werewolf retainer, she attempts to kill Doris before the wedding, only to find D standing against her.

Greco Rohman, son of the chief, wants Doris for himself. The same goes for the skilled fighter Rei-Ginsei and his Fiend Corps. Both men are eager to eliminate D, as his skills and Doris' favor make them see him as a threat. Doris knows she isn't the only one in trouble - her younger brother is perceived as her weakness, and more than one person is willing to use him as leverage against her.

== Adaptations ==
The novel is adapted into a direct-to-video film of the same name in 1985 and a manga series, Hideyuki Kikuchi's Vampire Hunter D, in 2007.

== Reception ==
Theron Martin of Anime News Network called the novel "a competent vampire-hunting story with enough strong points to balance out its weaknesses" and gave it a B rating. He praised the setting as a wholly credible world ruled by vampires and grounded in science fiction, rather than fantasy or the supernatural. However, he called the plotting "fairly rudimentary" and a standard tale of a hero and heroine struggling against colorful opposition coming from different directions, where even the few twists are hardly unique. While Martin praised the characters of Doris and Rei-Ginsei, he criticized D and Count Magnus Lee as having weak characterizations.
