= Hideyuki Kikuchi's Vampire Hunter D =

Japanese manga series

- The cover of Volume 1

バンパイアハンターD (Vanpaia Hantā D)
- Genre: Horror, post-apocalyptic, supernatural
- Manga
- Written by: Hideyuki Kikuchi
- Illustrated by: Saiko Takaki
- Published by: Media Factory (vol. 1–8); Asahi Shimbun (vol. 9–)
- English publisher: NA: Digital Manga Publishing
- Magazine: Monthly Comic Flapper (2007–2013); Sonorama+ (2024–current)
- Original run: 2007 – Ongoing
- Volumes: 9

Hideyuki Kikuchi's Vampire Hunter D, known simply as Vampire Hunter D (バンパイアハンターD, Vanpaiya Hantā D) in Japan, is a manga adaptation of the Vampire Hunter D novel series by acclaimed horror writer, Hideyuki Kikuchi.

Announced at Anime Expo 2006, the Vampire Hunter D manga is a collaboration between Hideyuki Kikuchi, Media Factory and Digital Manga Publishing. Kikuchi, who has always had a close relationship with his fans, has personally selected doujinshi artist Saiko Takaki as illustrator for the project.

The first volume was published on 14 November 2007, and was subsequently nominated as the third best new seinen manga of 2007 in an About.com reader's poll, and placed fifth in the SPJA Industry Awards in the "best action manga" category.

The plan was to adapt the entire catalogue of Vampire Hunter D novels into manga form but only the 1980s novels were adapted. The series was officially reported to be cancelled by DMP in November 2015, with no plans to release volume 8 in the USA. Last adapted volume 8 became available in English on digital since April 17, 2018 by Publisher KADOKAWA via BookWalker. The physical printed format was released in January 2023.

On July 2024, Asahi Shimbun Publishing announced the adaptation of the ninth novel in Hideyuki Kikuchi and Yoshitaka Amano's Vampire Hunter D novels, "The Rose Princess," into a manga, with Saiko Takaki returning as the illustrator. The serialization began on July 31 on Asahi Shimbun's Sonoroma+ website.

== Volume 1 ==
- Title: Hideyuki Kikuchi's Vampire Hunter D Volume 1
- Original Story: Hideyuki Kikuchi
- Adaptation: Saiko Takaki
- Artist: Saiko Takaki
- Translator: Earl Gertwagen
- Japanese release date: November 14, 2007
- Japanese ISBN 978-4-8401-1970-2
- English release date: November 25, 2007
- English ISBN 978-1-5697-0827-9

The year is 12,090 A.D., and what little is left of humanity has finally crawled out from the ashes of war and destruction. From the darkness of the fallout, mutants and a race of vampires known as the Nobility have spawned. They rule the weak with no remorse. Once bitten by a Noble, one is cursed to become a member of the undead. Villagers cower in fear, hoping and praying for a savior to rid them of their undying nightmare. All they have to battle this danger is a different kind of danger – a Vampire Hunter.

Enter D – a lone, mysterious Vampire Hunter sought out by the desperate Doris Lang. Bitten by the vampire lord Count Magnus Lee, Doris is destined to her eternal fate… Can D deliver her from her curse and bring her to salvation, or will she forever be part of the unholy dead?

Differences between the novel and film While the story remains intact, the manga takes some liberties with the narrative and character designs. Larmica returns to being blonde, but Doris is depicted with Red hair in the colored splash page after the cover. Certain events are shuffled around while others are slightly changed to take place at the same time as another. In the original Novel, Greco is killed by Larmica, but in the manga he is fatally wounded by Rei Ginsei (much like in the film). D's fight against Golem, Gimlet and Chullah remains the same as the novel (though Chullah may have survived this time around) while his triumph over Rei is slightly different (in the novel, D exploited Rei Ginsei's powers to finish the mutant, while in the manga he severs Rei's other hand, causing him to be decapitated by his own shrike blade). The ending appears to take elements from both the novel and film, in which D is seen safe and sound, leaving on horse back (in the novel, he doesn't appear after his conversation with Larmica-the film has Doris and Dan bidding their bodyguard farewell). D left his pendant in the care of Dan, not even returning to retrieve it after he vanquishes Count Lee.

== Volume 2 ==
- Title: Hideyuki Kikuchi's Vampire Hunter D Volume 2
- Original Story: Hideyuki Kikuchi
- Adaptation: Saiko Takaki
- Artist: Saiko Takaki
- Translator: Duane Johnson
- Japanese release date: June 6, 2008
- Japanese ISBN 978-4-8401-2240-5
- English release date: June 24, 2008
- English ISBN 978-1-5697-0787-6

When vampires begin hunting in daylight, the villagers of a small town must rely on D to solve the mystery – but will his efforts uncover an even more terrifying secret from the past?

This all-new manga adapts Raiser of Gales – the second Vampire Hunter D adventure!

== Volume 3 ==
- Title: Hideyuki Kikuchi's Vampire Hunter D Volume 3
- Original Story: Hideyuki Kikuchi
- Adaptation: Saiko Takaki
- Artist: Saiko Takaki
- Translator: Duane Johnson
- Japanese release date: May 26, 2009
- Japanese ISBN 978-4-8401-2571-0
- English release date: June 2, 2009
- English ISBN 978-1-5697-0788-3

The vampire hunter known only as D has been hired by a wealthy, dying man to find his daughter, who was kidnapped by the powerful vampire Lord Meyerling. Though humans speak well of Meyerling, the price on his head is too high for D to ignore and he sets out to save her before she can be turned into an undead creature of the night. In the nightmare world of 12090 A.D., finding Meyerling before he reaches the spaceport in the Clayborn States and gets off the planet will be hard enough, but D has more than just Meyerling to worry about. The dying man is taking no chances, and has also enlisted the Marcus family, a renegade clan of ruthless mercenaries who don't care who they kill as long as they get paid!

Hideyuki Kikuchi's Vampire Hunter D Volume 3 adapts Demon Deathchase, the third Vampire Hunter D light novel.

== Volume 4 ==
- Title: Hideyuki Kikuchi's Vampire Hunter D Volume 4
- Original story: Hideyuki Kikuchi
- Adaption: Saiko Takaki
- Artist: Saiko Takaki
- Translator: Duane Johnson
- Japanese release date: November 21, 2009
- Japanese ISBN 978-4-8401-2940-4
- English release date: December 30, 2009
- English ISBN 978-1-5697-0789-0

The City, a tiny metropolis of a few hundred sheltered citizens floating on a random course a few feet above the ground, has long been thought safe from the predation of monsters. It seems like a paradise until an invasion of an apparent vampire threatens the small community. While the Vampire Hunter known as "D" struggles to exterminate them, a former denizen of the city, Lori Knight, and John M. Brasselli Pluto VIII seize control of the city, lurching it onto a new and deadly course.

Hideyuki Kikuchi's Vampire Hunter D Volume 4 adapts Tale of the Dead Town, the fourth Vampire Hunter D light novel.

== Volume 5 ==
- Title: Hideyuki Kikuchi's Vampire Hunter D Volume 5
- Original story: Hideyuki Kikuchi
- Adaption: Saiko Takaki
- Artist: Saiko Takaki
- Translator: Duane Johnson
- Japanese release date: December 22, 2010
- Japanese ISBN 978-4-8401-3715-7
- English release date: December 29, 2010
- English ISBN 978-1-5697-0790-6

In a secluded village void of the dangers that come during the night, there lies an ageless sleeping beauty once bitten by a vampire 30 years ago. She is the key that holds the delicate balance in the village in which mortals and the Nobility can coexist. But when the wandering vampire known as “D” is drawn to the town by recurring dreams of the mysterious girl, the town will stop at nothing to protect that tranquil balance and stop the vampire hunter’s in his tracks.

Hideyuki Kikuchi's Vampire Hunter D Volume 5 adapts The Stuff of Dreams, the fifth Vampire Hunter D light novel.

== Volume 6 ==
- Title: Hideyuki Kikuchi's Vampire Hunter D Volume 6
- Original story: Hideyuki Kikuchi
- Adaption: Saiko Takaki
- Artist: Saiko Takaki
- Translator: Duane Johnson
- Japanese release date: January 23, 2012
- Japanese ISBN 978-4-8401-4084-3
- English release date: February 7, 2012
- English ISBN 978-1-5697-0791-3

The Nobility have captured a young Frontierswoman named Tae and held her captive for 8 years. Her prison, the remote Castle Gradinia, can only be accessed by those willing to cross into the no-man's-land known as the Outer Frontier. Granny Viper, known as the "people finder," has been charged with recovering the girl. Can she trust the Bullow Brothers, her shifty hired escorts? In a race across treacherous terrain, it will be up to D to lead the charge and level all enemies on this rescue mission.

Hideyuki Kikuchi's Vampire Hunter D Volume 6 adapts Pilgrimage of the Sacred and the Profane, the sixth Vampire Hunter D light novel.

== Volume 7 ==
- Title: Hideyuki Kikuchi's Vampire Hunter D Volume 7
- Original story: Hideyuki Kikuchi
- Adaption: Saiko Takaki
- Artist: Saiko Takaki
- Translator: Sachiko Sato
- Japanese release date: July 23, 2013
- Japanese ISBN 978-4-8401-5079-8
- English release date: June 12, 2013
- English ISBN 978-1-5697-0276-5

In her last breath, a woman on her deathbed hands a gemstone to D and asks that he deliver it to her sister in a remote North Sea fishing village. As D cuts across the endless expanses of Frontier in search of his seaside destination, he is attacked by waves of mercenaries and monsters that are employed by the man who murdered the young girl. In order to grant a dying wish, D must find a way to keep this priceless jewel out of everyone's covetous reach, and all without sacrificing his own life.

Hideyuki Kikuchi's Vampire Hunter D Volume 7 adapts the first half of Mysterious Journey to the North Sea, the seventh Vampire Hunter D light novel.

== Volume 8 ==
- Title: Hideyuki Kikuchi's Vampire Hunter D Volume 8
- Original story: Hideyuki Kikuchi
- Adaption: Saiko Takaki
- Artist: Saiko Takaki
- Translator: Sachiko Sato
- Japanese release Date: September 23, 2014
- Japanese ISBN 978-4-04-066853-6
- English release date: April 17, 2018 [digital] January 2023 [physical]
- English ISBN 978-1-56-970326-7

When the sister of a beautiful, murdered woman summons D to the village of Florence, the Hunter finds the once-thriving resort town in the grip of a vicious plague that seems to originate from the nearby sea. In a race against time, D must look back to a decadent age nearly a thousand years prior, when Florence's pleasure-seeking vampire inhabitants were banished by a lone soul dressed in black. Did the single standout from this mass exodus—the Baron Meinster—curse the town upon meeting his end at the hands of the mysterious traveler?

Hideyuki Kikuchi's Vampire Hunter D Volume 8 adapts the second half of Mysterious Journey to the North Sea, the seventh Vampire Hunter D light novel.

== See also ==
- List of comics based on fiction
