= Vampire Hunter D (1985 film) =

1985 Japanese animated film

- Theatrical poster, designed by Yoshitaka Amano

Japanese name
- Kanji: 吸血鬼ハンターD
Transcriptions
- Revised Hepburn: Banpaia Hantā Dī
- Directed by: Toyoo Ashida
- Screenplay by: Yasushi Hirano
- Based on: Vampire Hunter D by Hideyuki Kikuchi
- Produced by: Hiroshi Kato; Mitsuhisa Hida; Yukio Nagasaki
- Starring: Kaneto Shiozawa; Michie Tomizawa; Seizō Katō; Keiko Toda
- Cinematography: Kazushi Torigoe; Yukio Sugiyama
- Edited by: Kazuhiko Seki; Naoyuki Masaki; Toshio Henmi
- Music by: Tetsuya Komuro
- Production companies: Epic/Sony Records; Movic; CBS/Sony Group; Ashi Productions
- Distributed by: Toho
- Release date: 21 December 1985 (Japan)
- Running time: 80 minutes
- Country: Japan
- Language: Japanese

Vampire Hunter D (Japanese: 吸血鬼ハンターD, Hepburn: Banpaia Hantā Dī) is a 1985 Japanese original video animation directed by Toyoo Ashida from a screenplay by Yasushi Hirano. It is based on the 1983 novel of the same name by Hideyuki Kikuchi.

The film is set in the year 12,090 AD, in a post-nuclear holocaust world where a young woman hires a mysterious half-vampire, half-human vampire hunter to protect her from a powerful vampire lord.

== Plot ==
While walking her guard rounds in the country, Doris Lang, the orphaned daughter of a deceased werewolf hunter, is attacked and bitten by Count Magnus Lee, a 10,000-year-old vampire lord (also known as a Noble) for trespassing in his domain.

Doris later encounters a mysterious vampire hunter, known only as D. Infected from Count Lee's bite, she hires D to kill the vampire and save her from becoming one. While in town with D and her younger brother Dan, Doris is confronted by Greco Rohman, the mayor's son, who offers to help if he has Doris for himself, but she refuses. D requests that the authorities, including Greco's father, the town sheriff, and Dr. Ferringo, should hold off Doris' incarceration at the local asylum until he kills Count Lee.

That night, Doris's farm is attacked by Rei Ginsei, Count Lee's servant, and L'Armica, Count Lee's daughter, who is highly prejudiced against humans. During the battle, Rei reveals he has the ability to twist space around him. Because of these powers, D's attacks are redirected onto himself, but he quickly recovers from his wounds, revealing him to be a dhampir. After fending off L'Armica, he orders the pair to leave with a warning to Count Lee. The next day, D travels to Count Lee's castle and attempts to confront him. Aided by the symbiote in his Left Hand, D holds his own against the Count's monstrous minions. Doris is then kidnapped by Rei and brought to the Count. Using his vampiric powers, D rescues Doris and escapes the castle.

Later, Greco overhears a meeting between Count Lee's messenger and Rei, during which the former gives the latter a candle with Time-Bewitching Incense, a substance powerful enough to weaken anyone with vampire blood. Rei takes Dan hostage to lure D out into the open, and D comes to his rescue, cutting off Rei's hand in the process and discovering that the candle is a fake. Meanwhile, Dr. Ferringo turns out to be a vampire in league with Count Lee. He leads Doris into a trap but is killed by L'Armica after requesting to share Doris with the Count. Greco, who stole the candle from Rei, then appears and uses it to weaken L'Armica; also causing harm to Doris with it due to her infection. He is then shot at by Dan and falls down a cliff. Afterwards, Doris, who has by now fallen for D, tries to convince him to live with her and embraces him. This triggers D's vampire side, and he forces her away from him, unwilling to bite her.

The next morning, Rei kills Greco and uses the real candle to weaken D. Rei then mortally wounds the vampire hunter with a wooden stake. Doris is captured and taken back to the castle. Rei requests that the Count give him eternal life as a member of the Nobility, but is coldly rebuffed for his past failures. As a mutant attempts to devour D's comatose body, his Left Hand revives him just in time for him to kill the monster. As the processional for the Count and Doris' wedding takes place, Dan attempts to attack Lee. Unfortunately, he fails and falls into a chasm before being saved by Rei. Rei attempts to weaken the Count with the candle. However, Lee is too powerful and destroys it with his telekinetic abilities before killing Rei. Before Doris can be bitten by the Count, D appears and fights Lee. D's attacks are futile due to Lee's psychic abilities. About to be killed, D unleashes his own telekinetic power and succeeds in stabbing Lee in the heart. With Lee dying, his castle begins crumbling. D encourages L'Armica to start anew by living as a human, but she chooses to stay behind to ensure her father's legacy ends as the castle falls apart.

D, Doris, and Dan escape the collapsing castle. D then sets off under a now clear blue sky. Doris, now recovered from her bite, and Dan bid D goodbye as he looks back briefly at them and smiles.

== Voice cast ==
Character	Japanese	English	
Character	Japanese	Streamline Pictures (1992)	Toho/Sentai Filmworks (2015)
D	Kaneto Shiozawa	Michael McConnohie	John Gremillion
D's Left Hand	Ichirō Nagai	Michael McConnohie	Andy McAvin
Doris Lang	Michie Tomizawa	Barbara Goodson	Luci Christian
Count Magnus Lee	Seizō Katō	Jeff Winkless	David Wald
Dan Lang	Keiko Toda	Lara Cody	Shannon Emerick
Greco Rohman	Yūsaku Yara	Steve Bulen	Jay Hickman
Countess L'armica Lee	Satoko Kitou	Edie Mirman	Brittney Karbowski
Rei Ginsei	Kazuyuki Sogabe	Kerrigan Mahan	Andy McAvin
Dr. Sam Ferringo	Motomu Kiyokawa	Dr. Sam Fehring	John Swasey
Dr. Sam Ferringo	Motomu Kiyokawa	Steve Kramer	John Swasey
The Three Sisters/ Snake Women of Midwich	Kazuko Yanaga; Yoshiko Sakakibara	Joyce Kurtz	Tiffany Grant
Mayor Rohman	Yasuo Muramatsu	Tom Wyner	David Wald
Sheriff Luke Dalton	Kan Tokumaru	Kirk Thornton	Mark Laskowski
Messenger	—N/a	Kirk Thornton	Mark Laskowski
Gimlet	Shinya Otaki	—N/a	—N/a
Chuula	—N/a	—N/a	Mark Laskowski
Golem	—N/a	—N/a	George Manley

== Production ==
Vampire Hunter D is credited as one of the earliest anime productions targeted explicitly at the male teenager/adult demographic in lieu of family audiences, and capitalized on the emerging original video animation (OVA) market due to its violent content and influence from European horror mythology (such as the films of British film studio Hammer Film Productions). The film's limited budget made its technical quality comparable to most anime television series and other OVAs, but not with most theatrical animated films.

During the film's production, director Toyoo Ashida stated that his intention for the film was to create an OVA that people who had been tired from studying or working hard would enjoy watching, instead of watching something that would make them "feel even more tired".

Yoshitaka Amano, the illustrator of the original novels, acted as character designer for the OVA. However, alternative designs were provided by Ashida (who also acted as the film's animation director), and elements from both artists' works were combined to create final designs by the animators. Acclaimed pop artist Tetsuya Komuro was responsible for the film's soundtrack, and also performed the film's ending theme, "Your Song", with his fellow members of TM Network.

== Release ==
Vampire Hunter D was released theatrically on 21 December 1985 where it was distributed by Toho. A laserdisc by CBS Sony Group was released on the same date. A Region 2 DVD release of the film was released by SME Visual Works in Japan on 21 February 2001. An English-language version of the OVA was produced in 1992 by Streamline Pictures, and was shown on the fine-arts theatrical circuit in the US in 1992. Vampire Hunter D had its American premiere at the Cleveland Cinematheque on 27 March 1992 as part of the Japanimation Weekend IV event. The Streamline dub was then released on VHS on 26 March 1993. This initial release was followed by a re-release on VHS by Orion Home Video and a laserdisc release by Lumivison. The film was also shown several times on American television during the 1990s, including on TBS, Cartoon Network, and the Sci-Fi Channel. Vampire Hunter D is considered a flagship title for Streamline, and was marketed in the US as "the first animated horror film for adults".

In 2000, Urban Vision Entertainment, the US production partner and distributor of Vampire Hunter D: Bloodlust, re-released the OVA on a "Special Edition" bilingual DVD on 17 October containing the original Japanese audio and a Dolby Digital 5.1 remix of the Streamline dub, as well as releasing dubbed and subtitled versions of the film on VHS. The Special Edition DVD release was duplicated by Manga Entertainment for a UK release on 5 July 2004, as well as by Madman Entertainment in Australia on 31 August 2005. Madman reissued their Special Edition DVD on 23 July 2014.

On 16 April 2015, Sentai Filmworks announced their license to the film in North America for digital and home video release. The film was released on 25 August 2015 on Blu-ray and DVD with a new English dub.

== Reception ==
John Moscato of Protoculture Addicts gave the film a two out of a possible five star rating, writing that the film had unusually good animation but found the plot to be unoriginal and that it had poor voice acting for the Streamline English-language dub. Steve Murray of The Atlanta Constitution described the film as a "prime example of adrenalin-high, head-scratch Japanese animation" findings its plot nonsensical, concluding the film was "definitely for adults. Twisted ones."

== Footnotes ==
=== References ===
- Galbraith, Stuart, IV (2008). The Toho Studios Story: A History and Complete Filmography. Scarecrow Press. ISBN 9781461673743.
