= Shō Aikawa =

Shō Aikawa may refer to:

- Show Aikawa (born 1961), Japanese male actor and composer
- Shō Aikawa (screenwriter) (born 1965), Japanese screenwriter
