= Shō Aikawa (screenwriter) =

Japanese screenwriter (born 1965)

- Born: Noboru Aikawa; August 9, 1965 (age 61); Tokyo, Japan
- Other names: Fūkyōshi Oyamada; Gorō Sanyō; Kurō Hazuki
- Occupations: Screenwriter, novelist, mangaka
- Years active: 1983-present

Shō Aikawa (會川 昇, Aikawa Shō; born Noboru Aikawa (会川 昇, Aikawa Noboru) on August 9, 1965) is a Japanese screenwriter. Active in various fields (and credited through various pseudonyms) since he was 17 years old, the most popular works he has helmed have been in anime and tokusatsu: Dangaioh, Ultraman: Towards the Future, Martian Successor Nadesico, Love Hina, The Twelve Kingdoms, Fullmetal Alchemist, Kamen Rider Blade, GoGo Sentai Boukenger, Kamen Rider Decade and Concrete Revolutio.

Most of his anime work has been in adaptations which, when he is the main writer, feature significant deviations from the source materials' trajectory. Among those based on original concepts, 7 titles were conceived, wholly or partly, by him; he also had one manga he had written adapted to animation.

== Works ==
=== Filmography ===
==== Film ====
Year	Title	Credit	Notes	Ref(s)
1990	Ultraman: The Alien Invasion	Writer	Compilation films of Ultraman: Towards the Future	
1990	Ultraman: The Battle for Earth	Writer	Compilation films of Ultraman: Towards the Future	
1998	Ultra Nyan 2: Happy Daisakusen (ウルトラニャン)	Screenplay by		
2005	Fullmetal Alchemist the Movie: Conqueror of Shamballa	Story/Screenplay by		
2006	GoGo Sentai Boukenger The Movie: The Greatest Precious	Screenplay by		
2008	Engine Sentai Go-onger: Boom Boom! Bang Bang! GekijōBang!!	Screenplay by		
2011	Un-Go episode:0 Inga-ron (UN-GO episode:0 因果論)	Screenplay by	Short film	
2014	Senkan Yamato no Karei Raisu (戦艦大和のカレイライス)	Screenplay by	TV film	
2015	They Went and Came Back Again Ressha Sentai ToQGer: Super ToQ 7gou of Dreams (行って帰ってきた烈車戦隊トッキュウジャー 夢の超トッキュウ7号)	Screenplay by	V-cinema release	
2018	Mayonaka no Sūpākā (真夜中のスーパーカー)	Screenplay by	TV film	
2018	Engine Sentai Go-onger: 10 Years Grand Prix (炎神戦隊ゴーオンジャー10 YEARS GRANDPRIX)	Screenplay by	V-cinema release	

==== Television ====
Aikawa is credited as Noboru Aikawa (会川昇) on various projects.

Year	Title	Credit	Notes	Ref(s)
1983	Akû daisakusen Srungle (亜空大作戦スラングル)	Writer	3 episodes	
1986	Jikuu Senshi Spielban	Writer	23 episodes	
1987	Tokusō Saizensen	Writer	1 episode	
1987	Mister Ajikko	Writer	2 episodes	
1988	Sonic Soldier Borgman	Writer	8 episodes	
1988	The Burning Wild Man	Writer	1 episode	
1989	Jushin Liger	Writer	2 episodes	
1989	The Adventures of Hutch the Honeybee	Writer	1 episode	
1992	Ultraman: Towards the Future	Writer	5 episodes	
1992	Warashi (WARASHI)	Writer	1 episode	
1993	Shippū! Iron Leaguer	Writer	12 episodes	
1994	The Brave Police J-Decker	Writer	8 episodes	
1995	Wild Knights Gulkeeva	Writer	1 episode	
1995	Sorcerer Hunters	Writer	2 episodes	
1996	Martian Successor Nadesico	Series composition	15 episodes; also base planning; Wrote lyrics for "I Believe... Someday" (いつか...信じて)	
1998	Neo Ranga	Series composition	Creator; also wrote 28 episodes	
1999	Dai-Guard	Writer	5 episodes	
2000	Love Hina	Writer	14 episodes	
2000	Hiwou War Chronicles	Writer	18 episodes Original concept by Aikawa and Bones	
2001	Angelic Layer	Writer	4 episodes	
2001	Shaman King	Writer	12 episodes	
2002	RahXephon	Writer	1 episode	
2002	Samurai Deeper Kyo	Main writer	11 episodes	
2002	The Twelve Kingdoms	Main writer	Wrote all except ep. 41–45	
2002	Strange Steel Fay Rouran (奇鋼仙女ロウラン)	Main writer	18 episodes	
2003	Gad Guard	Main writer	10 episodes	
2003	Fullmetal Alchemist	Main writer	30 episodes	
2004	The Cosmopolitan Prayers	Writer	3 episodes	
2005	Black Jack	Writer	1 episode	
2005	Elemental Gelade	Writer	2 episodes	
2006	Simoun	Writer	5 episodes	
2006	Ghost Slayers Ayashi	Main writer		
2007	Oh! Edo Rocket	Main writer	16 episodes	
2008	Corpse Princess	Main writer		
2009	Kamen Rider Decade	Writer	11 episodes	
2010	Tegami Bachi	Writer	6 episode	
2011	Un-Go	Main writer		
2012	Eureka Seven	Main writer	16 episodes	
2013	Tantei Opera Milky Holmes	Writer	4 episodes	
2014	Future Card Buddyfight	Writer	15 episodes	
2015	Chaos Dragon	Main writer	7 episodes	
2015	Concrete Revolutio	Main writer	Wrote all except ep. 9, 16, 17, 20	
2015	Garo: Crimson Moon	Main writer	5 episodes	
2019	Cardfight!! Vanguard: Shinemon	Writer	8 episodes	
2020	Cardfight!! Vanguard	Writer	7 episodes	
2025	Digimon Beatbreak	Writer	10 episodes	

==== OVA/ONA ====
Aikawa is credited as Noboru Aikawa (会川昇) and Gorō Sanyō (三陽五郎) on various projects.

Year	Title	Credit	Notes	Ref(s)
1987	Daimajū Gekitō: Hagane no Oni	Writer		
1987	Yōtōden	Writer	2 episodes	
1987	Urotsukidoji: Legend of the Overfiend	Writer	Credited as Gorō Sanyō and Noboru Aikawa	
1987	Dangaioh	Writer	3 episodes	
1988	Starship Troopers	Writer	3 episodes	
1988	Dragon Century	Writer	2 episodes	
1988	Kaze wo Nuke! (風を抜け!)	Writer		
1988	Violence Jack: Evil Town	Writer		
1988	Spirit Warrior	Writer	3 episodes	
1988	Vampire Princess Miyu	Writer		
1988	Hades Project Zeorymer	Writer		
1989	Maryuu Senki	Writer	1 episode; also wrote unused 3rd episode	
1989	Blood Reign: Curse of the Yoma	Writer		
1989	Kyomu Senshi Miroku (虚無戦史MIROKU)	Writer	2 episodes	
1989	Dog Soldier: Shadows of the Past (ドッグソルジャー)	Writer	1 episode	
1989	Angel Cop	Writer	Co-wrote w/ Ichirō Itano	
1990	AD Police Files	Writer	2 episodes	
1990	Gude Crest	Writer	Wrote outline	
1990	The Demonic Beast Front (魔獣戦線)	Writer		
1990	The Hakkenden	Writer	5 episodes	
1990	Urotsukidōji: Legend of the Demon Womb	Writer	2 episodes	
1992	Return of the Overfiend	Writer	1 episode	
1993	The Hakkenden: A New Saga (THE 八犬伝 新章)	Writer	1 episode	
1993	Casshan: Robot Hunter	Writer	2 episodes	
1994	Genocyber	Writer	1 episode	
1994	Shippū! Iron Leaguer Ginhikari no Hata no Shita ni	Writer	3 episodes	
1996	My Dear Marie	Composition	Supervised by Aikawa as Gorō Sanyō	
2001	See in Ao (SeeIn青 -シーンAO-)	Writer		
2002	Love Hina Again	Writer		
2006	Fullmetal Alchemist: Premium Collection	Main writer		
2007	Ghost Slayers Ayashi: Divine Comedy	Main writer		
2011	Inga Diary	Main writer	Uncredited	

=== Literature ===
==== Books ====
Year	Title	Publisher	Notes
1985	The Day-to-Day Battle Bids Farewell, and Then: Shukei Nagasaka Scenario Masterpiece Collection (さらば斗いの日々、そして 長坂秀佳シナリオ傑作集)	Asahi Sonorama	Script collection
1986	Return of Ultraman Monster Encyclopedia (帰ってきたウルトラマン怪獣事典)	Asahi Sonorama	Supervised by Tsuburaya Productions
1986	Ultraman Ace Monster Encyclopedia (ウルトラマンA怪獣事典)	Asahi Sonorama	Supervised by Tsuburaya Productions
1987	Choujinki Metalder: The Feast of the Wolves (超人機メタルダー 狼たちの宴)	Bandai	Short story
1987	Steel Devil: Battle of the Great Demon Beasts (大魔獣激闘 鋼の鬼)	Tokuma Shoten	
1989	Fight! Iczer One (戦え!!イクサー1)	Kadokawa Shoten	Light novel; illustrations by Toshiki Hirano and Yasuhiro Moriki.
1989	Gunhed	Kadokawa Shoten	Light novel; illustrations by Kia Asamiya
1992	Spirit Warrior (孔雀王)	Shueisha	Light novel; illustrations by Makoto Ogino.
1995	Granhistoria: Kedamono, Urimasu (グランヒストリア けだもの、売ります)	ASCII Corporation	Short story;Illustration by Ikaru Hizuki. Published on the January issue of Logout magazine, never republished elsewhere.
2001	Love Hina: Mixed bathing Not Allowed - Mystery Guests at Hinata Hotel (ラブひな 混浴厳禁 ひなた旅館へようこそ!)	Kodansha	Light novel; illustrations by Ken Akamatsu. Published in English by Kodansha English Library (Japan) and Tokyopop (North America)
2002	The Twelve Kingdoms Anime Script Collection (十二国記 アニメ脚本集)	Kodansha	Script compilation; Illustrations by Hiroto Tanaka
2004	The Story of Fullmetal Alchemist (TVアニメ 鋼の錬金術師 シナリオブック)	Square Enix	Script compilation; With Toshiki Inoue, Aya Yoshinaga, Natsuko Takahashi, Katsuhiko Takayama, Manabu Ishikawa and Akatsuki Yamatoya
2005	Fullmetal Alchemist the Movie: Conqueror of Shamballa Scenario Book (劇場版 アニメ鋼の錬金術師 シャンバラを征く者 シナリオブック)	Square Enix	Script compilation; Supervised by Seiji Mizushima.
2005	Kamen Rider Blade: Dusk (仮面ライダー剣"たそがれ")	Shogakukan	Short story; illustrated by Kōji Iida (飯田浩司) (Ishimori Pro). Sequel to the TV series. Published in the Kamen Rider Blade Chouzenshuu book; republished in the 2015 book Let's Talk! 555, Blade and Hibiki (語ろう! 555・剣・響鬼).
2012	Un-Go: Inga Chapter (UN-GO 因果論)	Hayakawa Publishing	Adaptation of the film with an exclusive 100-page prequel
2012	Un-Go: Sho Aikawa Screenplay Collection (UN-GO 會川昇脚本集)	Media Pal	Script compilation
2015	Chiba Prefecture: Traditional Kaiju Bakkendon (千葉県 伝奇怪獣バッケンドン)	Yosensha	Short story; illustrations by Yūji Kaida
2015	Superhuman Phantasmagoria: The 36th of the Shinka Era (超人幻想 神化三六年)	Hayakawa Publishing	
2016	The 19th of the Shinka Era's Tohchika (神化一九年の)	Hayakawa Publishing	Short story; published on the May issue of Hayakawa's Mystery Magazine.

Light novels based on anime Aikawa created, but which he had no direct involvement on, also exist:

- Simoun (2 volumes); text by Junko Okazaki, illustrations by Studio Deen (volume 1 only) and Asako Nishida; published by Gakken
- Concrete Revolutio: Superhuman Phantasmagoria - Kikko Hoshino's Dangerous Blind Date! (コンクリート・レボルティオ 超人幻想 星野輝子のキケンなお見合い！) (1 volume); text by Aki Kanehiro, illustrations by Yoshiyuki Itō and Mutsuki Nago (名護ムツキ); published by Kodansha

==== Manga ====
Year	Title	Artist	Publisher	Notes
1988	Tensei Densetsu Banga (転生伝説バンガ; Reincarnation Legend Banga)	Masaomi Kanzaki	Hakusensha	
1990	The Untold Story of the Birth of the RX-78 (RX-78誕生秘話)	Yuuji Hosoi	Kodansha	Supervised by Craft Dan. One-shot; part of the magazine's Gundam Legends (ガンダム伝説) anthology line by various artists, all of which were collected in 2006's Gundam Magazine Masterpiece Collection (ガンダムマガジン名作集).
1992	Magician (魔術師)	Atsushi Yamagata (山形厚史)	Kadokawa Shoten	One-shot
1992	Divine Fire Soldier Abi (神火兵アビ)	Tetsuya Saruwatari	Shueisha	One-shot; collected on volume 3 of Saruwatari's series Damned.
1992	Rounin-Doushin (狼人同心)	Makoto Katayama	Shueisha	
1993	Nostradamus 2016	Hisashi Kotobuki	Kadokawa Shoten	Credited from the July 1993 to the May 1994 issues. Unfinished; never republished elsewhere.
1994	Kagemusha Tokugawa Ieyasu (影武者徳川家康)	Tetsuo Hara	Shueisha	
1997	Pure	Kenjirou Kakimoto	Shueisha	The series lasted for 3 volumes, but Aikawa was not involved in the making of the last two.
2010	Master Assassin Baian Fujieda (仕掛人 藤枝梅安)	Takao Saito	Leed	

Various manga adaptations of anime Aikawa co-created, each with varying degrees of adherence to their source materials, also exist, but he did not work on them directly:

- Clever Strange Successor Hiwou War Chronicles (機巧奇傳ヒヲウ戦記, Clockwork Fighters Hiwou's War) (4 volumes) by Hajime Jinguuji (神宮寺一) on Kodansha's Monthly Magazine Z
- Strange Steel Fay Rouran (奇鋼仙女ロウラン) (2 volumes) by Souji Unite on Kodansha's Monthly Magazine Z
- Simoun (1 volume) by Hashiba Hayase on Ichijinsha's Comic Yuri Hime
- Simoun -Magical Tale of Bravery- (シムーン 〜まじかる美勇伝〜) (parody manga, never intended to be collected into volumes); composition by Masafumi Harada (原田まさふみ), story by Masayoshi Maeda, art by Wataru Akiduki (あきづき弥); on Gakken's Megami Magazine
- Ghost Slayers Ayashi (天保異聞 妖奇士) (2 volumes) by Yaeko Ninagawa on Square Enix's Young Gangan; published in North America by Bandai Entertainment
- Un-Go: The Defeated Detective, Shinjūrō Yūki (UN-GO 敗戦探偵・結城新十郎) (3 volumes) by J-ta Yamada (originated by the Un-Go Production Committee, supervised by Bones and the Un-Go Production Committee) on Kadokawa Shoten's Newtype Ace
- Un-Go Episode 0: Inga Chapter (UN-GO episode:0 因果論) (1 volume); story by Aikawa, art by pako, artistic cooperation (作画協力) by Yun Kōga; on Kadokawa Shoten's Monthly Newtype
- Concrete Revolutio: Superhuman Phantasmagoria (コンクリート・レボルティオ ～超人幻想～) (2 volumes) by Nylon on Kadokawa Shoten's Young Ace; published in North America by Seven Seas Entertainment
- Concrete Revolutio: Superhuman Phantasmagoria Gaiden - Mahou Shoujo Tenkagomen! (コンクリート・レボルティオ ～超人幻想～ 外伝 魔法少女天下御免！) (1 volume); scenario composition (シナリオ構成) by Aki Kanehiro, art by Mutsuki Nago, manga original character designs by Noizi Ito; on Kodansha's Monthly Shōnen Sirius

=== Miscellaneous ===
==== Audio dramas ====
Year(s)	Title	Source material	Episodes written	Alias	Notes
1987–89	Treasure Hunter Dai Yagashira (トレジャー・ハンター八頭大)	Novels by Hideyuki Kikuchi	"Alien — Hidden Treasure Town" (エイリアン秘宝街); "Alien — Monster Cat Tale" (エイリアン怪猫伝)	Noboru Aikawa (会川昇)	
1988	Reverse Space Hunters (逆宇宙ハンターズ)	Novel by Ken Asamatsu	"Visions of Demonology" (魔教の幻影)	Noboru Aikawa (会川昇)	
1988	Adventure!! Iczer-3 (冒険!!イクサー3; Iczer Reborn)	Anime conceived by Toshiki Hirano	"Nagisa, 19 Years Old" (渚・19歳); "The Phantom of Iczer-2" (イクサー2の幻影); "The Cthulhu Depart" (クトゥルフ還る)	Noboru Aikawa (会川昇)	Released before the anime, has various differences in the story.
1988	Saint Seiya (聖闘士星矢; Knights of the Zodiac)	Manga by Masami Kurumada	"Under What Star?" (いかなる星の下に); "The Twelve Golden Houses" (黄金十二宮); "Beginning" (前編); "Ending" (後編)	Noboru Aikawa (会川昇)	
1988	A Warring States Legend of the Demon Blades (戦国奇譚 妖刀伝; Wrath of the Ninja)	Anime conceived by Osamu Yamazaki and Takeshi Narumi	"Legend of the Demon Blades: Chapter of Eternity" (妖刀伝・久遠の章)	Noboru Aikawa (会川昇)	"Special Drama" included on the soundtrack album for episode 3 of the OVA, Flames of Anger (炎情の章).
1988–90	Vampire Hunter D (吸血鬼(バンパイア)ハンターD)	Novels by Hideyuki Kikuchi	"Demon Deathchase" (Ｄ－妖殺行); "Mysterious Journey to the North Sea" (Ｄ－北海魔行); I: "To the North Sea" (北の海へ); II: "Summer at Last" (やがて、夏); III: "When Winter Comes Again" (冬きたりなば)	Noboru Aikawa (会川昇)	All installments reissued together (alongside one other novel not adapted by Aikawa) as a CD boxset in 2005.
1989	Tokyo Bad Boys (東京バッド・ボーイズ)	Short story collection by Keigo Misaki	"An Octopus Over a Boy's Head" (頭上のタコ坊)	Noboru Aikawa (会川昇)	
1989	Hyper Combat Unit Dangaioh (破邪大星弾劾凰(ダンガイオー))	Anime conceived by Toshiki Hirano	Single outing, no distinct title	Noboru Aikawa (会川昇)	Original story.
1989	Golden Warrior Iczer-One (黄金の戦士 ICZER-ONE)	Manga by Toshiki Hirano and Yasuhiro Moriki	Single outing, no distinct title	Noboru Aikawa (会川昇)	Fight! Iczer One prequel.
1989	Sakigake!! Otokojuku (魁!!男塾; Charge! Men's Private School)	Manga by Akira Miyashita	"Tenchou Gorin Dai Bukai" (天挑五輪大武会編); "Fight to the death! Final Tournament at Meiou Island" (死闘! 冥凰島決勝トーナメント)	Noboru Aikawa (会川昇)	
1989	Yuu the Stigmatizer (聖痕者ユウ)	Novel by Takeshi Narumi	"The Rose Stranger" (薔薇のストレンジャー)	Noboru Aikawa (会川昇)	
1990	The Legend of the Dog Warriors: The Hakkenden (THE 八犬伝)	Nansō Satomi Hakkenden novel by Bakin Takizawa	"ACT-1 Birth" (誕生); "ACT-2 Hamaji" (濱路); "ACT-3 Blood Ties" (血脈)	Noboru Aikawa (会川昇)	Also credited with composition. "Original Drama" included on the OVA's soundtrack.
1991	Spirit Warrior (孔雀王; Peacock King)	Manga by Makoto Ogino	"Grand Demon King of Darkness Arc" (暗黒大魔王編)	Noboru Aikawa (会川昇)	
1993	Platinum (プラチナ)	Manga by Masaki Sano & Kyo Watanabe	Single outing, no distinct title		
1993	Audio RPG: Super Dragon War Chronicles Sauros Knight (オーディオRPG 超龍戦記ザウロスナイト)	Manga by Katsu Aki	Single outing, no distinct title		Structured as a gamebook and character personalities altered, drastically deviating from the source material.
1993	Animal X	Manga by Ami Sugimoto	"Tribe of Wild Gods, Drama Version - Part I" (荒神の一族 ドラマ篇I)		Credited for "composition"; Sugimoto is credited for the script.
1993	The Flowery Keiji (花の慶次)	Manga by Keiichiro Ryu and Tetsuo Hara	"Beyond the Clouds" (雲のかなたに)		
1995	My Dear Marie (ぼくのマリー, Metal Angel Marie)	Manga by Sakura Takeuchi in cooperation with Gorō Sanyō	"CD Cinema" (シネマ); "1: The Birth of Marie" (1 マリー誕生); "2: Marie-chan Powers Up!" (2 マリちゃんパワーアップ！); "3: Since You Like it, Let's Kiss?" (3 スキだから、KISS？); "My Mari Radio Attack Thud-Thud Puff-Puff Shing-Shing-Shing" (ぼくマリ Radio Attack どんどん ぱふぱふ しゃんしゃんしゃん)	Gorō Sanyō (三陽五郎)	Credited as Sanyō for the original work and as Aikawa for the script; also participates as a narrator. Aired on Nippon Cultural Broadcasting before CD release.
1995–96	Kimagure Orange Road Original (きまぐれオレンジロードOriginal)	Manga by Izumi Matsumoto	"Sorry for the Indecision" (優柔不断でごめんなさい); "Happy Triangle" (ハッピートライアングル); "Is This What You Want?" (これでいいの?); "Two People in Danger" (危険なふたり); "Eternal Paradise" (永遠の楽園)	Gorō Sanyō (三陽五郎)	Credited as Sanyō for acting (plays the master) and as Aikawa for the script. Aired on 4 different regional radio stations before CD release.
1996	My Dear Marie WARS!! (ぼくのマリーWARS!!, Metal Angel Marie WARS!!)	Manga by Sakura Takeuchi in cooperation with Gorō Sanyō	"Multitenant Era" (雑居時代); "Cohabitation Era" (同棲時代); "Peaceful Era" (平安時代); "Diligent Studies Era" (蛍雪時代)	Gorō Sanyō (三陽五郎)	Credited as Sanyō for the original work and as Aikawa for the script; also participates as a narrator. Aired on Nippon Cultural Broadcasting before CD release.
1996	Gutsy Squadron Gutsmen (根性戦隊ガッツマン)	Essay by Yūko Miyamura	"Episode 186" (第186話)	Gorō Sanyō (三陽五郎)	Mini-drama included on Miyamura's Kenka Banchō album, whose first track—"The song for Girl"—features lyrics written by him (credited as Sanyō for the drama and as Aikawa for the song).
1997	Martian Successor Nadesico (機動戦艦ナデシコ)	Anime original concept	"Crew Edition" (クルー編); "'Nadesico vs. Gekiganger vs. Alien'...... Oh, What!?" (「ナデシコ対ゲキ・ガンガー対宇宙人」......って、オイ！？)	Gorō Sanyō (三陽五郎)	Originally released as part of the "Cassette Collection" and "Voice Cassette" lines of Animate-exclusive audio dramas. Both reissued (alongside another drama and 7 soundtracks/hybrid albums) as the ～once and again NADESICO～ CD boxset in 2006.
1997	Super-Duper University Academeowic (超々学園アカデミニャン)	Manga by Satoru Akahori and Bui Bui	"Second Semester" (二学期)		
1997	Master of Mosquiton '99 (マスターモスキートン'99)	Manga by Satoru Akahori and Hiroshi Negishi	"Master of Vampire" (ますたー・OF・ばんぱいあ)	Noboru Aikawa (会川昇)	Original story.
1997–98	Hunting Evil Spirits / Ghost Hunt (悪霊狩り〜ゴースト・ハント)	Novels by Fuyumi Ono	"Worikiri-sama's Demon Fire" (ヲリキリさまの鬼火); "Vlad is There" (ウラドは其処に居る); "Ebisu Heterodoxy" (えびす異神論); "Nightmare Dwelling" (悪夢の棲む家)		Order of stories deviates from the order the novels were published; last CD deviates from the original story due to not adapting two of the novels. Aired on Radio Nippon before CD release.
2000	Terrestrial Defense Corp. Dai-Guard (地球防衛企業 ダイ・ガード)	Anime original concept by Xebec	"Factual Recording! 21st Century Defense Security Corporation's Large New Year's Banquet" (ORIGINAL DRAMA ALBUM 実録! (株)21世紀警備保障 新年度大宴会)	Kurou Hazuki (葉月九ロウ)	Scenario and supervision by Seiji Mizushima, edited by Yasuko Kobayashi; co-written with Manabu Ishikawa, Akihiko Inari, Hidefumi Kimura and Mitsuyasu Sakai.
2002	Love Hina Again	Manga by Ken Akamatsu	"Last Promise" (最後の約束)	Kurou Hazuki (葉月九ロウ)	Tracks 1–13 on the OVA's original soundtrack. Released in North America by Geneon USA.
2002–03	The Twelve Kingdoms (十二国記)	Novels by Fuyumi Ono	"Picture Scroll of the Twelve Visions" (十二幻夢絵巻); "Youko" (Scene 1: 陽子); "Disguise" (Scene 2: 仮面); "Awakening" (Scene 3: 覚醒); "Peace of Mind" (Scene 4: 澄心); "The Three Dreams Chapter" (夢三章)		"Picture Scroll of the Twelve Visions" is a soundtrack album with drama tracks interspersed throughout, while "The Three Dreams Chapter" is wholly dedicated to drama.
2003	Samurai Deeper Kyo	Manga by Akimine Kamijyo	"The One-Eyed Dragon Roars" (独眼竜(ワン・アイド・ドラゴン)、吼える)	Fukyoushi Oyamada (小山田風狂子)	Original story that happens after the anime's final episode.
2004	Bakuryuu Sentai Abaranger (爆竜戦隊アバレンジャー; Burstosaur Sentai Abarenger)	Super Sentai installment by Saburo Yatsude	"Dino Earth Special! The Legendary Bracelet and the Five Abare Spirits" (PREMIIUM DRAMA CD ダイノアース スペシャル!伝説の腕輪と五つのアバレスピリッツ)		
2008	Oh! Edo Rocket (大江戸ロケット)	Stage play by Kazuki Nakashima	"Aural Play on Ingenious Reflecting Disc: Galactic Police 10-4・10-10" (音曲劇 機巧光盤 銀河警察 10-4・10-10(テン フォー・テン テン))		Available first-hand exclusively and for a limited time to applicants who purchased all 9 DVD volumes of the anime.
2009	The Twelve Kingdoms (十二国記) mini-drama CDs	Novels by Fuyumi Ono	"Sekiraku Volume" (赤楽篇); "Koushi Volume" (弘始篇); "Heisei Volume" (平成篇); "Daigen Volume" (大元篇)		Each CD available exclusively bundled with each volume of the series' second DVD/first Blu-ray release in Japan.
2011	Tegami Bachi REVERSE (テガミバチ; Letter Bee)	Manga by Hiroyuki Asada	"Niche to Ichiban" (ニッチとイチバン)		Exclusively bundled with the first-run limited edition of the volume 2 DVD of the anime.
2012	Un-Go	Ango's Detective Casebook novels by Ango Sakaguchi	"Chapter 1: Secrets of the Kaishōkan" (第1章 海勝館の秘密); "Chapter 2: Case of an Unconsecutive Series of Correct Interpretations" (第2章 不連続正解事件); "Chapter 3: I Just Want to Hug You Some More" (第3章 私はなんか抱きしめていたい); "Chapter 4: A Lot of Foobars at a Cherry Blossom Forest in Full Bloom" (第4章 桜の森の満開のホニャララの、のが多い)		Each chapter a CD exclusively bundled with each DVD/Blu-ray volume of the series in Japan.
2013	Asa Hiru Ban (あさひるばん)	Live-action film directed by Jūzō Yamasaki	"Asa Hiru Ban: The Beginning" (あさひるばん ビギニング)		Originally aired on NRN and affiliates. Only released as a CD exclusively bundled with the first-run limited editions of the film's DVD/Blu-ray releases.
2014	Ender's Game	Novel by Orson Scott Card	No distinct title		Broadcast on Nippon Broadcasting System and other radio stations nationwide. Made to promote—and stars the same cast as the Japanese dub of—the film adaptation. Never released on CD.
2019	Tenka Soul (天歌奏流)	Warring states rock action drama project by Tou Amane (天音トウ)			Credited for "cooperation" (協力), has described this role as "helper in name only".

At one point in the late '80s/early '90s he was assigned to write an audio drama adaptation of Rokudenashi Blues, but struggled with the material and had to give up the job. Aikawa wanted to make a Concrete Revolutio audio drama, but that did not happen due to budgetary reasons

==== Video games ====
Year(s)	Title	Developer	Publisher	Platform(s)	Credit	Notes
1988	Angelus: The Gospel on Evil (アンジェラス 〜悪魔の福音〜)	Enix	Enix	PC-88, PC-98, FM-7, MSX	PLOT OF A PLAY	
1993	The Journey Home: Quest for the Throne	Wolf Team	Telenet Japan	Super Famicom	story supervisor	Scenario written by Yuji Sobue (祖父江裕次) and Hisayoshi Sahara (砂原久美). Credited as "Noboru Aikawa" (会川昇).
1995	Granhistoria -Genshi Sekaiki- (グランヒストリア 〜幻史世界記〜)	J-Force	Banpresto	Super Famicom	original story	With Jun Nanbara (南原順). Primarily worked on original draft and composition, did not write the second half of the script.
1997	Martian Successor Nadesico -After All, in the End, 'Love Wins'?- (ノ機動戦艦ナデシコ ～やっぱり最後は「愛が勝つ」？～)	Sega, Nexus Interact	Sega	Sega Saturn	scenario supervisor	With Mitsuyasu Sakai.
1998	Martian Successor Nadesico: The Blank of 3 Years (ノ機動戦艦ナデシコ The blank of 3 years)	Scarab, Fupac, Nexus Interact	Sega	Sega Saturn	screenplay	With Mitsuyasu Sakai, Kazuhiro Ochi, Naruhisa Arakawa, Yasuo Yamabe and Toshifumi Kubota (久保田俊史).
