= Vampire Hunter D: Throng of Heretics =

Novel by Hideyuki Kikuchi

D - Throng of Heretics
- Cover of the Japanese edition of 'D - Throng of Heretics'
- Author: Takumi Minamino
- Original title: D-Throng of Heretics (D-魔道衆, 'D - Madōshū')
- Illustrator: Yoshitaka Amano
- Language: Japanese
- Series: Vampire Hunter D Vol. 19
- Genre: Science fiction, Fantasy, Light novel
- Published: 2007 (Asahi Shimbun JP)
- Publication place: Japan
- Media type: Print (Paperback)
- Pages: 333 (JP)
- ISBN: 4-257-76225-X
- Preceded by: Iriya the Berserker
- Followed by: Immortal Island

Vampire Hunter D: Throng of Heretics is a Japanese novel by Hideyuki Kikuchi. It was first published in Japan in 2007.

== Book description ==
A device which has observed ruins in the southern Frontier Sector for 300 years suddenly deactivates. Nobles who were cruelly slaughtered by the hands of men, the survivors of the Zeno family, are revived. Fearing the fangs of vengeance, the mayor of the village where the murderer's descendants reside hires five vampire hunters. As the mayor returns from the Capital, five enemies target his daughter. During a thunderstorm, a noble attacks her on the mountain pass. Amid the flashes of lightning, the master's beautiful visage appears... The bloodsucking Nobles, the hunters, and D -- the chaotic journey of three parties begins as the bloody wind blows.

== Serialization ==
D - Throng of Heretics was originally released as a serialization in mobile format for a small monthly fee, updated twice a week, available to NTT DoCoMo, au EZweb, and Vodafone live! subscribers. The serialized version contains some differences from the novel version, due largely to the fact that the novel is based on the original manuscripts, while the MysteryWorld version was edited and revised as part of the serialization process.
