= List of Vampire Hunter D novels =

Vampire Hunter D
- Cover of the first Vampire Hunter D novel
- Created by: Hideyuki Kikuchi
- Owner: Asahi Sonorama and Asahi Shimbun Publications
- Years: 1983–present (Japanese); 2005–present (English)

Print publications
- Novels: Vampire Hunter series: Vampire Hunter D (1983) Raiser of Gales (1984) Demon Deathchase (1985) Tale of the Dead Town (1986) The Stuff of Dreams (1986) Pilgrimage of the Sacred and the Profane (1988) Mysterious Journey to the North Sea (1988) The Rose Princess (1994) Pale Fallen Angel (1994–1996) Twin-Shadowed Knight (1996–1997) Dark Road (1999) Tyrant's Stars (2000–2001) Fortress of the Elder God (2001) Mercenary Road (2003) Scenes from an Unholy War (2003) Record of the Blood Battle (2004) White Devil Mountain (2005) Iriya the Berserker (2007) Throng of Heretics (2007) Undead Island (2008) Bedeviled Stagecoach (2009) Nightmare Village (2010) The Tiger in Winter (2011) Noble Front (2012) Gold Fiend (2012) Sylvia's Road Home (2013) Festival of the Nobility (2014) Banquet in Purgatory (2014) The Twisted Nobleman (2015) The Wicked Beauty (2016) Lost Legion of the Nobility (2016) The Five Assassins (2017) Cursed Demon Flight (2018) Deadened City (2018) The Visitor in Black (2019) Mountain Demon (2019) Dark Witchsong (2020) The Assassins' Stronghold (2021) Demon Howl Expedition (2021) Bloodwind Trail (2022) Dawnshadow Legion (2023) Chronicle of the Mystic Battle in Demonvale (2024): Another Vampire Hunter series: The Noble Greylancer (2011) Blood of a Hero (2011)

This is a listing of all light novels in the Vampire Hunter D series, written by Hideyuki Kikuchi, illustrated by Yoshitaka Amano, Ayami Kojima and Vincent Chong, and translated by Kevin Leahy and Takami Nieda.

== Publication history ==
=== Japanese editions ===
Known simply as the Vampire Hunter (吸血鬼ハンター, Banpaia Hantā) series in Japan, the first novel, Vampire Hunter "D", was written by Hideyuki Kikuchi and published in 1983. To date, over 40 novels have been published in the main series, with some novels comprising as many as four volumes; including the supplemental volume, Dark Nocturne, over 50 individual volumes have been published. The series has also spawned anime, audio drama, and manga adaptations, art books, and a supplemental guide book.

All of the official publications in the series were originally published by Asahi Sonorama under the Sonorama Bunko label. Additionally, from November 1992 through February 1993, special hardcover editions of the first seven volumes, plus Dark Nocturne, were published by Asashi Sonorama to commemorate the series' 10th anniversary, as the Vampire Hunter Favorite Printing Series (吸血鬼ハンター愛蔵版シリーズ, Banpaia Hantā Aizōban Shirīzu); each included a new cover illustration and a color interior illustration by Yoshitaka Amano.

Following the closing of the Sonorama branch in September 2007, the release of D – Throng of Heretics in October 2007 under the Asahi Bunko – Sonorama Selection label marked the transition to the new publisher, Asahi Shimbun Publishing, a division of Asahi Sonorama's parent company. From December 2007 through January 2008, Asahi Shimbun Publishing reprinted the complete Vampire Hunter catalogue under the Sonorama Selection label, including e-book releases on the Kindle platform.

In January 2011, Asahi Sonorama published the first spinoff light novel series set in the Vampire Hunter universe, a prequel series written by Kikuchi titled Another Vampire Hunter: The Noble Greylancer (吸血鬼ハンター / アナザー 貴族グレイランサー, Banpaia Hantā Anazā: Kizoku Gureiransā), illustrated by Ayami Kojima, artist and character designer for the Castlevania series of video games. Only two volumes were published, both in hardcover, with a planned third volume on hold since 2013. In May and June 2021 Asahi Shimbun published new paperback and Kindle editions of the two volumes, featuring new cover illustrations by Yoshitaka Amano.

In November 2017, Kikuchi began to serialize new Vampire Hunter stories in Asahi Shimbun's monthly magazine Issatsu no Hon (一冊の本, lit. One Book) with the story Vampire Hunter: D – Deadened City (吸血鬼ハンター Ｄ－死情都市, Banpaia Hantā Dī – Shijō Toshi). These stories are later collected and printed as full entries in the main series, sometimes under new titles. The most recent story is Vampire Hunter: D – The Noble Butcher (吸血鬼ハンター D－殺戮貴族, Banpaia Hantā: D – Satsuriku Kizoku), which began serialization in July 2025.

In December 2025, it was announced that Vampire Hunter D 44: D – Crimson Summer Procession would be the final volume to feature monochrome interior illustrations by Yoshitaka Amano. The volume was released in January 2026 alongside the commemorative artbook Vampire Hunter D: The Complete Illustration Collection, which compiles all of his interior illustrations. Amano continues to serve as the series' cover illustrator.

=== English editions ===
On May 11, 2005, the first official English translation was released by DH Press and Digital Manga Publishing, translated by Kevin Leahy. Translations of subsequent volumes have released at a relatively consistent annual or biannual pace, and supplementary material including a guidebook and two artbooks have also been published.

The numbering scheme for the official English releases are inconsistent with the original Japanese, as each book is individually numbered regardless of whether multi-part stories are divided between multiple volumes or compiled into a single volume, and because the supplementary short story anthology Dark Nocturne is included. In cases where multi-part stories are compiled in a single volume, the second volume's cover is presented as a color frontispiece.

In 2012 Dark Horse Books began to publish e-book editions of the series on the Kindle platform, and after 2014 Dark Horse Books took over as the publishing imprint for future print editions.

In 2013 Viz Media's Haikasoru imprint released an official English translation of the first book in the prequel series, retitled Noble V: Greylancer, translated by Takami Nieda with newly commissioned cover artwork by Vincent Chong.

In 2021 Dark Horse Books began to publish omnibus editions with Vampire Hunter D Omnibus: Book One collecting the first three novels in the series. In late 2021 they also began to publish official dramatized audiobook adaptations of the novels produced by GraphicAudio, featuring a full voice cast, music, and sound effects.

In July 2024, the publication of Gold Fiend following a lengthy COVID-19 pandemic-related delay concluded Kevin Leahy's current contract with Dark Horse. As of January 2025 there are no firm plans for a continuation, though Leahy has committed to completely translating the series, whether through Dark Horse or another publisher.

== Vampire Hunter series ==
=== Vampire Hunter D ===
Publication Details

	Japanese	English
Title	Vampire Hunter "D" (吸血鬼ハンター"D", Banpaia Hantā "D")	Vampire Hunter D Volume 1
Date	January 31, 1983 (Sonorama Bunko); December 10, 2007 (Sonorama Selection)	May 11, 2005
ISBN	ISBN 4-257-76225-X (Sonorama Bunko); ISBN 4-02-265500-3 (Sonorama Selection)	ISBN 1-59582-012-4

Doris Lang, orphaned daughter of a Werewolf Hunter, hires the dhampir Vampire Hunter D to take care of Count Magnus Lee. But the vampiric ruler of that Frontier sector is only one of her problems.

The Count's daughter Larmica and the werewolf retainer Garou are determined to see Doris dead before she can be drawn into their "family." Greco Rohman, son of the chief of Ransylva village, has his lecherous eye on Doris. And dashing, deadly Rei-Ginsei and his Fiend Corps are also closing in.

This book was loosely adapted into the first Vampire Hunter D animated movie, Vampire Hunter D. Collected in Vampire Hunter D Omnibus: Book One.

=== Raiser of Gales ===
Publication Details

	Japanese	English
Title	Vampire Hunter 2: Raiser of Gales "D" (吸血鬼ハンター2 風立ちて"D", Banpaia Hantā 2: Kaze Tachite "D")	Vampire Hunter D Volume 2: Raiser of Gales
Date	May 10, 1984 (Sonorama Bunko); December 10, 2007 (Sonorama Selection)	August 17, 2005
ISBN	ISBN 4-257-76274-8 (Sonorama Bunko); ISBN 4-02-265501-1 (Sonorama Selection)	ISBN 1-59582-014-0

A long, hard winter, due perhaps to problems with the weather controllers, has isolated the village of Tepes. Near the village stands a strange hill, a one-time stronghold of the Nobility which still contains beautiful paintings and experimental equipment. Ten years earlier, four children disappeared while playing, only to reappear a month later.

Now in 12090 A.D., a new terror grips the village as the victims of vampires moving in daylight begin to appear. The village turns of course to D, who finds that all suspicion has already fallen on those missing children, three of whom have now grown into excellent adults. The girl Lina in particular is fascinated by vampire art, even though it may cost her a scholarship to the Capital—her only chance of leaving the hick village.

Collected in Vampire Hunter D Omnibus: Book One.

=== Demon Deathchase ===
Publication Details

	Japanese	English
Title	Vampire Hunter 3: D – Demon Deathchase (吸血鬼ハンター3 D―妖殺行, Banpaia Hantā 3: D – Yōsatsukō)	Vampire Hunter D Volume 3: Demon Deathchase
Date	July 31, 1985 (Sonorama Bunko); December 10, 2007 (Sonorama Selection)	January 18, 2006
ISBN	ISBN 4-257-76310-8 (Sonorama Bunko); ISBN 978-4-02-265502-8 (Sonorama Selection)	ISBN 1-59582-031-0

With his dying breath, an old man begs that his daughter and the Noble who made off with her be pursued and, if necessary, slain. Their destination is a spaceport in the Claybourne States and their ultimate goal—a world where their love might be safe. The vampire Mayerling is perhaps the only one humans ever spoke well of, and the girl, who remains strangely nameless throughout the book, goes with him of her own free will.

Still, the old man puts a hefty price on their heads, and that sort of blood in the water draws Hunters—the notorious Marcus clan and D. The four Marcus brothers Borgoff, Nolt, Groveck, and Kyle, along with their sister Leila, are as famous for their Vampire Hunting as they are for their predilection toward killing off the competition, and they hide a dark secret about their sister as well.

As if all this warfare was not lively enough, Mayerling pulls through the hamlet of Barbarois and enlists a trio of powerful bodyguards from the local population—all of which are human/monster half-breeds.

This novel was loosely adapted into the second VHD animated movie, Vampire Hunter D: Bloodlust. Collected in Vampire Hunter D Omnibus: Book One.

=== Tale of the Dead Town ===
Publication Details

	Japanese	English
Title	Vampire Hunter 4: D – Tale of the Dead Town (吸血鬼ハンター4 D―死街譚, Vampire Hunter 4: D – Shigaitan)	Vampire Hunter D Volume 4: Tale of the Dead Town
Date	January 31, 1986 (Sonorama Bunko); January 7, 2008 (Sonorama Selection)	May 30, 2006
ISBN	ISBN 4-257-76321-3 (Sonorama Bunko); ISBN 978-4-02-265503-5 (Sonorama Selection)	ISBN 1-59582-093-0

Pausing long enough to rescue a young lady and make an apparent ally, D rendezvous with his next place of employment, a city of 500 which floats a meter above the ground and cruises at 20 km/h. "The Town", long thought safe from marauding monsters, has suffered a rash of vampire attacks. But the introduction of D, the young lady and former tenant of said city Lori Knight and the brash John M. Brasselli Pluto VIII does little to alleviate their woes.

=== The Stuff of Dreams ===
Publication Details

	Japanese	English
Title	Vampire Hunter 5: The Stuff of Dreams "D" (吸血鬼ハンター5 夢なりし"D", Banpaia Hantā 5: Yumenarishi "D")	Vampire Hunter D Volume 5: The Stuff of Dreams
Date	December 25, 1986 (Sonorama Bunko); January 7, 2008 (Sonorama Selection)	October 13, 2006
ISBN	ISBN 4-257-76361-2 (Sonorama Bunko); ISBN 978-4-02-265504-2 (Sonorama Selection)	ISBN 1-59582-094-9

D goes to a thriving town where, in the past ages, mortals and the Nobility lived together peacefully. The 17-year-old beauty Sybille Schmitz has slept there for 30 years since being bitten, neither waking nor aging. It is dreams of her dancing in a ghostly chateau bathed in blue light that lure D there, where the entire village has already dreamt of the handsome dhampir.

There are a number of folks who feel that by awakening the sleeping woman, the Vampire Hunter will destroy their peaceful world, and they would gladly kill D to prevent that. After all, their village produces 20 times as much food as they need, and the exporting of that bounty has made them quite comfortable. And the murderous Bio Brothers, Harold and Duncan, are called in to see to the disposal of the cursed half-breed D.

=== Pilgrimage of the Sacred and the Profane ===
Publication Details

	Japanese	English
Title	Vampire Hunter 6: D – Pilgrimage of the Sacred and the Profane (吸血鬼ハンター6 D―聖魔遍歴, Banpaia Hantā D – Seima Henreki)	Vampire Hunter D Volume 6: Pilgrimage of the Sacred and the Profane
Date	March 5, 1988 (Sonorama Bunko); January 7, 2008 (Sonorama Selection)	December 13, 2006
ISBN	ISBN 4-257-76400-7 (Sonorama Bunko); ISBN 978-4-02-265505-9 (Sonorama Selection)	ISBN 1-59582-106-6

A supposedly impassable desert lies between the Inner and Outer Frontier. To cross it, the centenarian Granny Viper is looking for some powerful backup. Granny is a "people finder" and she must ferry her latest find, a young woman named Tae, across to the town of Barnabas in the next four days.

As an "abductee" who lived 8 years in the vampire castle of Gradinia, Tae is the object of suspicion. Her only hope for future happiness is pinned on arriving in Barnabas before the last of her blood relations move on. Hoping to play on the sympathies of frosty D and enlist his aid, Granny offends her other potential escorts—those renowned warriors of the Frontier, Bingo and Clay Bullow. The following arrangement is reached: D is traveling to Barnabas on business of his own, Granny and Tae are free to follow him, and the Bullow Brothers tag along as well to settle the score with D when the journey is over. But it will not be easy going, as the desert has a mind of its own.

=== Mysterious Journey to the North Sea ===
Publication Details

Part One
	Japanese	English
Title	Vampire Hunter 7: D – Mysterious Journey to the North Sea (Part One) (吸血鬼ハンター7 D―北海魔行 〔上〕, Banpaia Hantā 7: D – Hokkai Makō (Jō))	Vampire Hunter D Volume 7: Mysterious Journey to the North Sea, Part One
Date	October 31, 1988 (Sonorama Bunko); January 7, 2008 (Sonorama Selection)	April 25, 2007
ISBN	ISBN 4-257-76433-3 (Sonorama Bunko); ISBN 978-4-02-265506-6 (Sonorama Selection)	ISBN 1-59582-107-4
Part Two
	Japanese	English
Title	Vampire Hunter 7: D – Mysterious Journey to the North Sea (Part Two) (吸血鬼ハンター7 D―北海魔行 〔下〕, Banpaia Hantā 7: D – Hokkai Makō (Ge))	Vampire Hunter D Volume 8: Mysterious Journey to the North Sea, Part Two
Date	December 30, 1988 (Sonorama Bunko); January 7, 2008 (Sonorama Selection)	August 22, 2007
ISBN	ISBN 4-257-76438-4 (Sonorama Bunko); ISBN 978-4-02-265507-3 (Sonorama Selection)	ISBN 1-59582-108-2

In D – Mysterious Journey to the North Sea (Part One), the 17-year-old Wu-Lin is traveling from the fishing village of Florence to Cronenberg to have a strange jewel appraised. No less than three people try to steal it from her: the young commoner Toto, an old artist named Professor Krolock, and the grotesque Gilligan, an obscenely overweight gangland boss in a custom exo-skeleton. He has Wu-Lin killed, but her dying request of D is that he bring the gem back to her older sister Su-In in their village on the north sea.

Gilligan is determined to have the gem. He dispatches five mysterious individuals with the promise that the one who brings it to him will get all he possesses. This group consists of such colorful characters as Shin the Puppetman, King Egbert, Undiscernible Twin, and Reminiscence Samon. Also tailing D from Cronenberg is handsome Glen, a warrior and "seeker of knowledge" who wants to kill the Vampire Hunter because he's the only thing he has ever feared.

The second part of the story, D – Mysterious Journey to the North Sea (Part Two), begins when everyone arrives in Florence just as its short, week-long summer is about to begin. Millennia ago, the area had been a resort for the Nobility until the day, about 1000 years ago, when a traveler in black arrived and punished the cruel vampire residents. Only Baron Meinster refused to leave, and the traveler threw him into the sea. Now, for the past few years, the village's summer has been marred by vampire attacks -- "Meinster's Revenge." Su-In hired D because something particularly distressing is going on here. Though the whole world knows that the Nobility have difficulty with rain or flowing water, the vampire in Florence seems to be coming from the sea.

=== The Rose Princess ===
Publication Details

	Japanese	English
Title	Vampire Hunter 8: D – The Rose Princess (吸血鬼ハンター8 D―薔薇姫, Banpaia Hantā 8: D – Baraki)	Vampire Hunter D Volume 9: The Rose Princess
Date	January 31, 1994 (Sonorama Bunko); January 7, 2008 (Sonorama Selection)	November 7, 2007
ISBN	ISBN 4-257-76641-7 (Sonorama Bunko); ISBN 4-02-265509-7 (Sonorama Selection)	ISBN 1-59582-109-0

In the village of Sacuri a young lady is brought by carriage to see a Noble woman, but before the princess can finish feeding on this offering, a young man shows up and attempts to slay the vampire. He fails, but with the aid of a glider-like backpack he manages to escape from her and her armored bodyguards. But back in the village, the entire populace is being held prisoner until he is captured. No one may leave or enter, under pain of death, and if the youth is not found in ten days, ten villagers will be impaled with five more villagers to be drawn and quartered for every day after that he remains missing.

D arrives just as two of the four knights who serve the princess are keeping several families from fleeing. Even after a third knight arrives on the scene, they do nothing to stop him from entering the village. Clearly the Blue Knight, Red Knight, and Black Knight have reservations about crossing blades with the dashing Hunter. Once in town, he pays a visit to an old witch named Mama Kipsch to give her a message from her grandson—the youth who attacked the princess in the first place. D informs her that the boy is dead now, but that he recruited the Vampire Hunter before he died.

The village of Sacri, it seems, has made a deal with the devil: The princess has seen to it that their lands remained fertile and her superhuman knights have protected them from both bandits and monsters, but in return, they have had to let the princess feed on them. Still, not everyone in town is happy with the status quo. A group of biker toughs led by Elena would be all too happy to see the Vampire Hunter dispose of the local Nobility.

=== Pale Fallen Angel ===
Publication Details

Part One
	Japanese	English
Title	Vampire Hunter 9: D – Pale Fallen Angel 1 (吸血鬼ハンター9 D―蒼白き堕天使 1, Banpaia Hantā 9: D – Aojiroki Datenshi 1)	Vampire Hunter D Volume 11: Pale Fallen Angels, Parts One and Two
Date	July 30, 1994 (Sonorama Bunko); January 7, 2008 (Sonorama Selection)	October 15, 2008
ISBN	ISBN 4-257-76682-4 (Sonorama Bunko); ISBN 978-4-02-265510-3 (Sonorama Selection)	ISBN 1-59582-130-9
Part Two
	Japanese	English
Title	Vampire Hunter 9: D – Pale Fallen Angel 2 (吸血鬼ハンター9 D―蒼白き堕天使 2, Banpaia Hantā 9: D – Aojiroki Datenshi 2)	Collected with Part One
Date	April 30, 1995 (Sonorama Bunko); January 7, 2008 (Sonorama Selection)	Collected with Part One
ISBN	ISBN 4-257-76710-3 (Sonorama Bunko); ISBN 978-4-02-265511-0 (Sonorama Selection)	Collected with Part One
Part Three
	Japanese	English
Title	Vampire Hunter 9: D – Pale Fallen Angel 3 (吸血鬼ハンター9 D―蒼白き堕天使 3, Banpaia Hantā 9: D – Aojiroki Datenshi 3)	Vampire Hunter D Volume 12: Pale Fallen Angel, Parts Three and Four
Date	November 15, 1995 (Sonorama Bunko); January 7, 2008 (Sonorama Selection)	March 18, 2009
ISBN	ISBN 4-257-76744-8 (Sonorama Bunko); ISBN 4-02-265512-7 (Sonorama Selection)	ISBN 1-59582-131-7
Part Four
	Japanese	English
Title	Vampire Hunter 9: D – Pale Fallen Angel 4 (吸血鬼ハンター9 D―蒼白き堕天使 4, Banpaia Hantā 9: D – Aojiroki Datenshi 4)	Collected with Part Three
Date	March 30, 1996 (Sonorama Bunko); January 7, 2008 (Sonorama Selection)	Collected with Part Three
ISBN	ISBN 4-257-76774-X (Sonorama Bunko); ISBN 978-4-02-265513-4 (Sonorama Selection)	Collected with Part Three

When you want the job done right, hire a professional, and that's what Baron Byron Balazs does. As one of the blood-drinking Nobility, the Baron is hardly the sort of employer you would expect for a Vampire Hunter, but D agrees to act as his bodyguard in exchange for an obscene amount of money and the Baron's word that he won't dine on any humans during the long trip to Krauhausen. Furthermore, on their arrival there the good Baron wants D to dispose of Lord Vlad Balazs—his own father. He is truly his father's son, for at the same time Lord Vlad is retaining the services of a half dozen Hunters with promises of a king's ransom to the individual or group who does away with the young Baron. Joining the pair in their travels are the haughty Miska, a snobbish Noblewoman saved from the stake who also happens to be bound for Krauhausen, the adolescent acrobat team of Hugh and May, raised by a circus after vampires killed their parents, and, finally, the lovely Taki, formerly the assistant to the cruel trail magician Johann and currently fleeing from the same.

=== Twin-Shadowed Knight ===
Publication Details

Part One
	Japanese	English
Title	Vampire Hunter 10: D – Twin-Shadowed Knight 1 (吸血鬼ハンター10 D―双影の騎士 1, Banpaia Hantā 10: D – Sōei no Kishi 1)	Vampire Hunter D Volume 13: Twin-Shadowed Knight, Parts One and Two
Date	November 30, 1996 (Sonorama Bunko); January 7, 2008 (Sonorama Selection)	December 2, 2009
ISBN	ISBN 4-257-76792-8 (Sonorama Bunko); ISBN 978-4-02-265514-1 (Sonorama Selection)	ISBN 1-59307-930-3
Part Two
	Japanese	English
Title	Vampire Hunter 10: D – Twin-Shadowed Knight 2 (吸血鬼ハンター10 D―双影の騎士 2, Banpaia Hantā 10: D – Sōei no Kishi 2)	Collected with Part One
Date	October 20, 1997 (Sonorama Bunko); January 7, 2008 (Sonorama Selection)	Collected with Part One
ISBN	ISBN 4-257-76818-5 (Sonorama Bunko); ISBN 978-4-02-265515-8 (Sonorama Selection)	Collected with Part One

D – Twin-Shadowed Knight 1 begins with D slaying a vampire, who leaves the triumphant Hunter with the cryptic words, "Find Muma." Not sure exactly if "Muma" is a person, place, or thing, D travels to the village of Sedoc, where a huge misty crater is attracting the dead for hundreds of miles around. In the village he meets Mia, the lovely young daughter of a fortune-teller, who promptly retains his services. It seems that her mother has foreseen something terrible happening there, and being on her own deathbed, sent her daughter in her stead to try and prevent that catastrophe. But when they go to the newly formed crater to see what could prompt thousands of corpses to rise from their graves and throw themselves into that hole, things get really weird. The D that emerges from the mist brutally dispatches a vigilante group formed by the young men of the village, and begins to act quite unlike himself.

This other D, or "the false D" as he is called, has set up shop in the base at the bottom of the crater. While he looks and dresses just like the Hunter we know and love, there are differences, too. He's much more garrulous, has an eye for the ladies, and is certainly more emotional. However, the only physical difference is that he lacks the mysterious symbiotic face in his left hand. And while he is very protective of the strange experimental station, eventually he joins forces with D and Mia.

In D – Twin-Shadowed Knight 2, the trio hits the road in search of "Muma," running across two technicians who had assisted the vampires' "Sacred Ancestor" in his experiments, and had their lives strangely prolonged in the process. The first is a man named Gii, who has created a ghastly Lovecraftian creature that he worships as a god. His sister Shusha is a ghost now, killed as a witch by villagers she wanted to help and unable to move on due to the artificial heart the Sacred Ancestor gave her. Still able to feel pain, she is tortured by a twisted monk who sends a band of mounted skeletons after D.

In their travels, D, "the false D", and Mia see a mountain range collapse to reveal a road long concealed—the road that they must travel. But they are not alone on that torturous track. There are hundreds of victims of the Sacred Ancestor out there looking for him, hovering in a strange state which is neither life nor death, longing for him to taste their blood again. The road, it seems, is a part of his experiments, an unearthly form of natural selection that becomes more difficult with each step, ensuring that only the strongest can continue on.

=== Dark Road ===
Publication Details

Part One
	Japanese	English
Title	Vampire Hunter 11: D – Dark Road 1 (吸血鬼ハンター11 D―ダーク・ロード1, Banpaia Hantā 11: D – Dāku Rōdo 1)	Vampire Hunter D Volume 14: Dark Road, Parts One and Two
Date	March 31, 1999 (Sonorama Bunko); January 7, 2008 (Sonorama Selection)	May 19, 2010
ISBN	ISBN 4-257-76862-2 (Sonorama Bunko); ISBN 978-4-02-265516-5 (Sonorama Selection)	ISBN 1-59582-440-5
Part Two
	Japanese	English
Title	Vampire Hunter 11: D – Dark Road 2 (吸血鬼ハンター11 D―ダーク・ロード2, Banpaia Hantā 11: D – Dāku Rōdo 2)	Collected with Part One
Date	June 10, 1999 (Sonorama Bunko); January 7, 2008 (Sonorama Selection)	Collected with Part One
ISBN	ISBN 4-257-76877-0 (Sonorama Bunko); ISBN 978-4-02-265517-2 (Sonorama Selection)	Collected with Part One
Part Three
	Japanese	English
Title	Vampire Hunter 11: D – Dark Road 3 (吸血鬼ハンター11 D―ダーク・ロード3, Banpaia Hantā 11: D – Dāku Rōdo 3)	Vampire Hunter D Volume 15: Dark Road, Part Three
Date	September 30, 1999 (Sonorama Bunko); January 7, 2008 (Sonorama Selection)	August 4, 2010
ISBN	ISBN 4-257-76883-5 (Sonorama Bunko); ISBN 978-4-02-265518-9 (Sonorama Selection)	ISBN 1-59582-500-2

Running across an isolated community composed entirely of former vampire victims, D rescues a woman named Rosaria from a death squad that has annihilated the other pariahs, and deals with killers. But before he can escort the woman to safety she is abducted by General Gaskell—a vampire Noble, surpassed only by the Sacred Ancestor in popularity among human researchers. An uncompromising warrior, the General had one side of his immortal body permanently burned when he remained locked in combat with a foe despite the rising of the sun. Gaskell knew secrets no other vampire did, and he led rebel forces in an assault on "the Capital" for hundreds of years before he was finally destroyed. But now he has strangely reappeared, and he's not alone—he commands a number of the most infamous vampires in history, renowned even more for the murder of their own kind than for that of humanity.

Though he must rescue Rosaria from Gaskell's floating castle, D finds himself on foot out in the middle of nowhere after his cyborg horse is destroyed, until salvation arrives in the form of a wagon train carrying a transport squad from the Frontier Commerce Guild. The Commerce Guild uses these wagons to supply goods to the scattered villages of the Frontier, so it's rather surprising when these astute business men refuse to let D pay for a horse—but in the end the deal they strike is much better indeed. Gaskell's mobile castle has drifted into the area, making their normally dangerous job that much more perilous, so they hire D as their escort in exchange for the horse. Before accepting the assignment D manages to extricate Rosaria from the castle, but in the process he's blinded by Madame Laurencin, one of Gaskell's evil cohorts.

In addition to General Gaskell and Madame Laurencin, there are a number of notable adversaries waiting for their crack at D. First is Duke Shuma, a fop with a lethal walking stick who has responded to the General's call in the place of his father. Roland, Duke of Xenon, is a heavily armored vampire who can summon spears out of thin air. His daughter, Lady Ann, is an 800-year-old vampire trapped in a body that looks less than 10, but she states she and her basket loaded with deadly flowers have one more kill to their credit than her infamous father does. Major General Gillis comes from a clan of assassins, and he has the ability to move in the form of a shadow. He also has his heart set on Lady Ann. Grand Duke Mehmet controls a giant robotic combat suit from a safe distance. The suit not only mimics his movements, but it also shares the recuperative powers of its vampire master for so long as he lives. And Doctor Gretchen is the ruthless Noblewoman who conducted her poisoning experiments on tens of thousands of humans and vampires. While poison cannot kill vampires, it can leave them in torment until the end of time, and it is said that thousands of her undying victims are still suffering in hidden labs.

Despite the fact that D is blind, and that Lady Ann nearly destroys his left hand in a misguided attempt to free him from its malignant influence, he manages to keep the vampires at bay. As a last resort, Gaskell decides he must put another fearsome warrior named Lord Rocambole into the fray—but Rocambole requires several sacrificial victims from the ranks of the vampires and there is a dearth of volunteers. In fact, it's rather amusing to see how each tries to strike a deal with the General to kill the others in order that he or she might be spared. And as the body count rises, Gaskell and his minions are left wondering just who exactly the Sacred Ancestor was trying to kill.

=== Tyrant's Stars ===
Publication Details

Part One
	Japanese	English
Title	Vampire Hunter 12: D – Tyrant's Stars 1 (吸血鬼ハンター12 D―邪王星団1, Banpaia Hantā 12: D – Jaō Seidan 1)	Vampire Hunter D Volume 16: Tyrant's Stars, Parts One and Two
Date	July 31, 2000 (Sonorama Bunko); January 7, 2008 (Sonorama Selection)	April 13, 2011
ISBN	ISBN 4-257-76909-2 (Sonorama Bunko); ISBN 978-4-02-265519-6 (Sonorama Selection)	ISBN 1-59582-572-X
Part Two
	Japanese	English
Title	Vampire Hunter 12: D – Tyrant's Stars 2 (吸血鬼ハンター12 D―邪王星団2, Banpaia Hantā 12: D – Jaō Seidan 2)	Collected with Part One
Date	November 30, 2000 (Sonorama Bunko); January 7, 2008 (Sonorama Selection)	Collected with Part One
ISBN	ISBN 4-257-76915-7 (Sonorama Bunko); ISBN 978-4-02-265520-2 (Sonorama Selection)	Collected with Part One
Part Three
	Japanese	English
Title	Vampire Hunter 12: D – Tyrant's Stars 3 (吸血鬼ハンター12 D―邪王星団3, Banpaia Hantā 12: D – Jaō Seidan 3)	Vampire Hunter D Volume 17: Tyrant's Stars, Parts Three and Four
Date	February 28, 2001 (Sonorama Bunko); January 7, 2008 (Sonorama Selection)	October 18, 2011
ISBN	ISBN 4-257-76927-0 (Sonorama Bunko); ISBN 978-4-02-265521-9 (Sonorama Selection)	ISBN 1-59582-820-6
Part Four
	Japanese	English
Title	Vampire Hunter 12: D – Tyrant's Stars 4 (吸血鬼ハンター12 D―邪王星団4, Banpaia Hantā 12: D – Jaō Seidan 4)	Collected with Part Three
Date	April 30, 2001 (Sonorama Bunko); January 7, 2008 (Sonorama Selection)	Collected with Part Three
ISBN	ISBN 4-257-76932-7 (Sonorama Bunko); ISBN 978-4-02-265522-6 (Sonorama Selection)	Collected with Part Three

The story begins shortly after D – Dark Road, with D squaring off against Count Braujou, a 10-foot-tall (3.0 m) vampiric Nobleman who has sat in the same spot for 5001 years. D has been hired to dispatch him because the Capital wants to claim his treasure, and the two are just about to do battle when something crashes back to earth, destroying half the northern Frontier in the process.

This is what Braujou has waited long millennia for—the return of the renegade vampire Lawrence Valcua from his exile to outer space. Valcua is also known as "the Ultimate Noble", and he wields a mystic sword named Glencaliber that can open or close the fabric of space with a single slash. But despite being the hero who led the Nobility's attack against the alien homeworld when the O.S.B (outer-space beings) tried to take Earth from the vampires, he eventually earned him the wrath of others of his kind, including the Sacred Ancestor. When he was exiled to outer space, Valcua took his entire kingdom with him, and swore that when the time was right they would be back to have their revenge.

But Braujou has been waiting for more than just a fight with a skilled opponent. There is a promise he must keep. Back in the days when the other Nobility were trying to overcome Valcua, they found him a very worthy foe, indeed. The warlord Gaskell, Count Braujou, and Duke Harness were traveling to their showdown with him when they found a human by the side of the road. A former prisoner who had been kept in the Ultimate Noble's castle for experimentation, something about him moved Braujou to give him some medicine, and the man swore he'd repay that kindness. The vampires laughed and told the human he should accompany them to the castle then, and gave him no more thought. But after Harness was slain, and both Braujou and Gaskell were ready to fall to Valcua, the man appeared and saved them by knocking the Ultimate Noble back with a cross he fashioned from two swords, which enabled an escape. The grateful vampires were prepared to grant him any request, but knowing that someday Valcua would return and have his revenge on all those responsible for his defeat, he only asked that his descendants be protected from the horrible wrath that would eventually come. That man's name was Winslow Dyalhis.

Now, years later, Adele Dyalhis lives in the village of Somui with her teenage children Matthew and Sue and her good-for-nothing drunkard husband. Braujou and Duchess Miranda; the widow of Harness, rush to protect the Dyalhis family from certain retribution. However; seven of Valcua's powerful henchmen have already been sent to settle the long overdue account. Amongst the superhuman fiends there is a female water sprite named Lucienne (who can appear wherever there's water), a web-spinning mutant from the lunar colonies by the name of Speeny, the mesmerizing traveling preacher Curio, the ax-wielding Jessup the Beheader, and a young giant named Seurat. D has agreed to postpone his business with Braujou until he's had a chance to honor his agreement. Additionally; Mrs. Dyalhis is able to enlist D's protection for her children.

=== Fortress of the Elder God ===
Publication Details

	Japanese	English
Title	Vampire Hunter 13: D – Fortress of the Elder God (吸血鬼ハンター13 D―邪神砦, Banpaia Hantā 13: D – Jashintoride)	Vampire Hunter D Volume 18: Fortress of the Elder God
Date	December 30, 2001 (Sonorama Bunko); January 7, 2008 (Sonorama Selection)	September 5, 2012
ISBN	ISBN 4-257-76952-1 (Sonorama Bunko); ISBN 978-4-02-265523-3 (Sonorama Selection)	ISBN 1-59582-976-8

The story begins when a nun delivers a mysterious orphan named Toto to a futuristic airport, where we meet the rest of the passengers who will accompany him on the flight to the Capital. There's the old married couple of Mr. And Mrs. Stow who left the center of known civilization to travel around the Frontier visiting their fully grown children. In rather sharp contrast to these normal folks is Jan, a petty gangster with a crescent scar on his face and a machete he'll pull at the drop on a hat, and Maria, a blonde boozer. A pair of cops called Wiseman and Goseau will also be on board, along with the "suckling" they're escorting—a hooded prisoner who has felt the bite of the Nobility, and Bierce, an arrow-hurling warrior who is past his prime.

When the group's aircraft is ravaged by an unknown force and goes down in the middle of a deadly zone strangely nicknamed "the playground", the passengers know that nearly all hope is lost—no search party would ever venture into the area, they are hundreds of miles from anywhere, and strange beasts are beginning to close in on them. Luckily for them D happens to be riding by, and he agrees to be their guard at Toto's request—but only after he has taken care of business at a strange fortress in the area. Given the choice of waiting there alone or traveling along with the Hunter on his perilous errand, the party chooses the latter.

The fortress in question has a chilling history. Thousands of years earlier, the Sacred Ancestor's army laid siege to it, because the Nobles there had taken to worshipping a tentacled "god" named Kururu. Vampires, it seems, do not have much of a knack for taking their own lives, so they wanted this dark god to destroy the whole world, themselves included. Three hundred believers in the fortress were able to hold out against 30,000 attackers for thirteen months due to their great faith and the power their "god" gave them. That same number of troops was killed in a single day, with only Arch Duke Valcua surviving the incident. Finally, the Sacred Ancestor alone made it through the doors and came out a year later—apparently so exhausted that he slept for the next century. But no one has been inside in the last 5000 years.

Once D arrives, the fortress goes back into operation, and another of the Sacred Ancestor's armies—at least 30,000 troops who were tucked away in another dimension waiting for such an occurrence—shows up to lay siege again. The army is hell-bent on getting into the fortress and destroying everyone inside, which is bad news for D and the stranded travelers since they have taken shelter in it. But they have more than the enemy at the walls to worry about, as a voice speaks to many of them and promises tremendous power in exchange for following its secretive instructions.

=== Mercenary Road ===
Publication Details

	Japanese	English
Title	Vampire Hunter 14: D – Mercenary Road (吸血鬼ハンター14 D―妖兵街道, Banpaia Hantā 14: D – Yōhei Kaidō)	Vampire Hunter D Volume 19: Mercenary Road
Date	February 28, 2003 (Sonorama Bunko); January 7, 2008 (Sonorama Selection)	March 6, 2013
ISBN	ISBN 4-257-76994-7 (Sonorama Bunko); ISBN 4-02-265524-0 (Sonorama Selection)	ISBN 978-1-61655-073-8

The action begins on a lazy day in Bossage, one of the Frontier's more prosperous towns. A ruthless quartet robs the local bank, slaughtering everyone present—and the chilling account of their actions is given by the first guard slain! His spirit has been channeled to explain that one of the four bank robbers is possessed by something that the guard fears even beyond the grave. The mayor of Bosage is trying to hire a pair of skilled warriors—a flamboyantly dressed man named Strider and a woman in dragon-scale armor by the name of Stanza—to go down the "Florence Highway" after the bank robbers, as well as to rescue people from the surrounding area from another threat.

It seems that a mysterious army once covered the road to Grand Duke Dolreack's castle, so that the "Florence Highway" is also known as the "Highway of the Enchanted Troops." And now reports have filtered into town that the enchanted troops are back, threatening everyone in the area. The mayor needs someone to go to the now-abandoned castle and rescue any humans who might have taken shelter there, since the castle is a kind of holy ground for the troops and should keep them at bay. He's just about to pay Strider and Stanza twice as much as he originally bargained for when the Vampire Hunter D rides into town. With D around, the two warriors will be lucky if they can get in on the job now at half the going rate, but the mayor didn't make his town rich by being stupid. He wants the added insurance of having the warriors go with the Vampire Hunter, whether any of the three likes it or not.

When he's not being pestered by either of the warriors, D is visited by a rather rotund and hirsute man with the unlikely appellation of "Beatrice." A decade earlier, Beatrice was part of a group of Hunters who ventured into Dolreack's castle, and he barely made it out alive. Although he no longer remembers what happened inside, he does have a notebook full of things he wrote in his delirium shortly after escaping the former lair of the Nobility, and he thinks this may be of interest to D.

While D and his companions are out battling their way through the rapidly growing forces—soldiers dressed in ash-gray military apparel who are roughly human except for their glassy green eyes and lipless slash of a mouth—they rescue a girl named Elene Slocum, then encounter the bank robbers. While all of these humans are essentially baggage to the Vampire Hunter, they end up traveling together anyway. As they make their way to the castle, they try to discover who has brought the enchanted troops back, and for what purpose.

=== Scenes from an Unholy War ===
Publication Details

	Japanese	English
Title	Vampire Hunter 15: D – Scenes from an Unholy War (吸血鬼ハンター15 D―魔戦抄, Banpaia Hantā 15: D – Masenshō)	Vampire Hunter D Volume 20: Scenes from an Unholy War
Date	July 31, 2003 (Sonorama Bunko); January 7, 2008 (Sonorama Selection)	December 11, 2013
ISBN	ISBN 4-257-77014-7 (Sonorama Bunko); ISBN 978-4-02-265525-7 (Sonorama Selection)	ISBN 978-1-61655-255-8

The story begins by describing a pair D has seen several times in his travels: a woman and a man, always together, always on the road. Cut to a village called Genevez on the western edge of the Frontier, where D encounters the pair for a third time. The man, named Rust, is the sheriff there, and the woman, Lira, assists him in his duties. D is among the warriors and mercenaries summoned to defend the village from a notorious bandit gang known as the Black Death. But now it appears the Black Death won't be descending on the village, and the mayor wants to dismiss the hired help at a fraction of their agreed wages. The deputy mayor, Odama, wants to pay them even less, or kill the itinerant warriors so they won't join forces with the Black Death. D rewards Odama for his scathing character assessment by lopping off his nose.

No sooner does D leave the scene than he's struck by "sunlight syndrome"—the periodic ailment unique to dhampirs last seen in Demon Deathchase. Strangely enough, the staff of the local hotel have been taught what to do for a dhampir in these dire straits, so D is in good hands. But while D is recovering, and his left hand is running the show, Rust and Lira ask him to hang around a while longer and help them out. It seems the Black Death is going to pay a call on them after all.

=== Record of the Blood Battle ===
Publication Details

	Japanese	English
Title	Vampire Hunter 16: D – Record of the Blood Battle (吸血鬼ハンター16 D―血闘譜, Banpaia Hantā 16: D – Kettōfu)	Vampire Hunter D Volume 21: Record of the Blood Battle
Date	May 31, 2004 (Sonorama Bunko); January 7, 2008 (Sonorama Selection)	July 8, 2014
ISBN	ISBN 4-257-77024-4 (Sonorama Bunko); ISBN 978-4-02-265526-4 (Sonorama Selection)	ISBN 1-61655-437-1

D agrees to escort a convoy carrying a Noble to face public trial. A bandit seeks the "Dead Love Flower" that the Noble had successfully cultivated, and the enemies of the Noble's parents target the men and women of the group. Can D bring himself to kill humans in order to protect the Noble!?

=== White Devil Mountain ===
Publication Details

Part One
	Japanese	English
Title	Vampire Hunter 17: D – White Devil Mountain (Part One) (吸血鬼ハンター17 D―白魔山 〔上〕, Banpaia Hantā 17: D – Hakumasan (Jō))	Vampire Hunter D Volume 22: White Devil Mountain, Parts One and Two
Date	February 28, 2005 (Sonorama Bunko); January 7, 2008 (Sonorama Selection)	January 13, 2015
ISBN	ISBN 4-257-77049-X (Sonorama Bunko); ISBN 978-4-02-265527-1 (Sonorama Selection)	ISBN 1-61655-509-2
Part Two
	Japanese	English
Title	Vampire Hunter 17: D – White Devil Mountain (Part Two) (吸血鬼ハンター17 D―白魔山 〔下〕, Banpaia Hantā 17: D – Hakumasan (Ge))	Collected with Part One
Date	July 31, 2005 (Sonorama Bunko); January 7, 2008 (Sonorama Selection)	Collected with Part One
ISBN	ISBN 4-257-77059-7 (Sonorama Bunko); ISBN 978-4-02-265528-8 (Sonorama Selection)	Collected with Part One

D – White Devil Mountain (Part One): A shuttle containing a Noble in a coffin crashes into White Devil Mountain while en route to the Capital. The Noble is none other than Gilzen, who is detested as a demon to the point that even allied Nobles chose to bind his coffin with heavy chains and seal it deep underground. Commissioned by a Noble to recover the coffin, D ventures into the snowstorm which constantly rages around the mountain. In tow are two men, a female doctor, a guard, a boy looking for his father, and a female bounty hunter who opposes D. Gathering together, they begin the dangerous hike up the mountain.

D – White Devil Mountain (Part Two): Within a castle piercing the mountainside, D finds the group of knights who protect the most unlucky Noble, Gilzen, like their king. However, another soldier is waiting for him—an extraterrestrial who crash landed 10,000 years ago and was captured and turned into a vampire by Gilzen. Using the advanced technology that Gilzen stole from the extraterrestrial, he separates the castle and those within from the flow of time. His goal: to oppose the Sacred Ancestor's rise to power.

=== Iriya the Berserker ===
Publication Details

	Japanese	English
Title	Vampire Hunter 18: D – Iriya the Berserker (吸血鬼ハンター18 D―狂戦士イリヤ, Banpaia Hantā 18: D – Kyōsenshi Iriya)	Vampire Hunter D Volume 23: Iriya the Berserker
Date	January 31, 2007 (Sonorama Bunko); January 7, 2008 (Sonorama Selection)	March 8, 2016
ISBN	ISBN 978-4-257-77067-1 (Sonorama Bunko); ISBN 978-4-02-265529-5 (Sonorama Selection)	ISBN 1-61655-706-0

An attractive female warrior named Iriya appears before D. Since childhood, her goal has been to slay her parents and siblings who had been transformed into vampires by the Nobility.

=== Throng of Heretics ===
Publication Details

	Japanese	English
Title	Vampire Hunter 19: D – Throng of Heretics (吸血鬼ハンター19 D―魔道衆, Banpaia Hantā 19: D – Madōshū)	Vampire Hunter D Volume 24: Throng of Heretics
Date	October 5, 2007	October 4, 2016
ISBN	ISBN 978-4-02-265530-1	ISBN 1-61655-789-3
Serialization	MysteryWorld (for Mobile Phones)	Not available

A device which has observed ruins in the southern Frontier Sector for 300 years suddenly deactivates. Nobles who were cruelly slaughtered by the hands of men, the survivors of the Zeno family, are revived. Fearing the fangs of vengeance, the mayor of the village where the murderer's descendants reside hires five vampire hunters. As the mayor returns from the Capital, five enemies target his daughter. During a thunderstorm, a noble attacks her on the mountain pass. Amid the flashes of lightning, the master's beautiful visage appears... The blood-sucking Nobles, the hunters, and D—the chaotic journey of three parties begins as the bloody wind blows.

=== Undead Island ===
Publication Details

	Japanese	English
Title	Vampire Hunter 20: D – Undead Island (吸血鬼ハンター20 D―不死者島, Banpaia Hantā 20: D – Fushishajima)	Vampire Hunter D Volume 25: Undead Island
Date	September 5, 2008	March 14, 2017
ISBN	ISBN 978-4-02-265531-8	ISBN 1-5067-0163-9

There was once a laboratory of the Nobility on a lone island, from which white mist poured out, and a nearby fishing village whose citizens would vanish, reduced to servants of the Nobility. The village, Meg, was struck by this tragedy countless times. The town's security officer hired bounty hunters to cross to the solitary island, to investigate and return to the village with news, but the mysterious troupe was soon seized. What's more, the beautiful D has been witnessed on the island. Who on Earth could have hired him, and why is he there? D displays his serene swordsmanship on the Nobility's island in this eagerly anticipated publication.

=== Bedeviled Stagecoach ===
Publication Details

	Japanese	English
Title	Vampire Hunter 21: D – Bedeviled Stagecoach (吸血鬼ハンター21 D―魔性馬車, Banpaia Hantā 21: D – Mashō Basha)	Vampire Hunter D Volume 26: Bedeviled Stagecoach
Date	September 18, 2009	November 28, 2017
ISBN	ISBN 978-4-02-265532-5	ISBN 1-5067-0199-X

A female government official is ordered to escort captured servants of the Nobility on a convoy, along with three aides: a hunter, a blacksmith, and a barmaid, to the Capital. However, the highway crosses into the territory of the Noble that is their master. In the wake of monster attacks which increase as they approach the danger zone, D appears.

=== Nightmare Village ===
Publication Details

	Japanese	English
Title	Vampire Hunter 22: D – Nightmare Village (吸血鬼ハンター22 D―悪夢村, Banpaia Hantā 22: D – Akumumura)	Vampire Hunter D Volume 27: Nightmare Village
Date	September 17, 2010	August 28, 2018
ISBN	ISBN 978-4-02-265533-2	ISBN 1-5067-0927-3

A group of travelers caught in a landslide take refuge in a village, once the testing ground for a nightmarish experiment in which the DNA of outer-space beings, humans, and nobles was used to create a new form of life. When the sleeping village awakens with a thirst for blood and a pair of nobles command a bizarre prototype to attack the travelers, D arrives to put an end to the town's legacy.

=== The Tiger in Winter ===
Publication Details

	Japanese	English
Title	Vampire Hunter 23: D – The Tiger in Winter (吸血鬼ハンター23 D―冬の虎王, Banpaia Hantā 23: D – Fuyu no Koō)	Vampire Hunter D Volume 28: The Tiger in Winter
Date	August 5, 2011	October 1, 2019
ISBN	ISBN 978-4-02-264619-4	ISBN 978-1-5067-1429-5

At the request of a beautiful woman on the verge of death, D embarks on a journey to meet Duke Van Doren. Villagers, bandits, and an investigation team from the Capital—all rush out in pursuit of the Duke's mysterious new invention. What is this invention that could change the world? As the setting sun continues its descent and time transitions into an endless winter, a solitary Noble, once renowned as the Royal Tiger for his valor on the battlefield, welcomes D.

=== Noble Front ===
Publication Details

	Japanese	English
Title	Vampire Hunter 24: D – Noble Front (吸血鬼ハンター24 D―貴族戦線, Banpaia Hantā 24: D – Kizoku Sensen)	Vampire Hunter D Volume 29: Noble Front
Date	March 7, 2012	April 14, 2020
ISBN	ISBN 978-4-02-264657-6	ISBN 978-1-5067-1629-9

Hired to kill a Noble who has been sharing technology with humans in exchange for sacrifices, D travels to the Castle of Bergenzy in the Northern Frontier. However, the fortress was once a testing ground for the Sacred Ancestor's mysterious experiments, and its terrible legacy may just be the most horrific enemy that D has ever faced. Originally announced with the working title D – The Distant Path (D―遙かなる道, D – Haruka naru Michi).

=== Gold Fiend ===
Publication Details

Part One
	Japanese	English
Title	Vampire Hunter 25: D – Gold Fiend (Part One) (吸血鬼ハンター25 D―黄金魔 〔上〕, Banpaia Hantā 25: D – Ōgonma (Jō))	Vampire Hunter D Volume 30: Gold Fiend, Parts One and Two
Date	August 31, 2012	July 10, 2024
ISBN	ISBN 978-4-02-264672-9	ISBN 978-1-5067-2079-1
Part Two
	Japanese	English
Title	Vampire Hunter 25: D – Gold Fiend (Part Two) (吸血鬼ハンター25 D―黄金魔 〔下〕, Banpaia Hantā 25: D – Ōgonma (Ge))	Collected with Part One
Date	December 7, 2012	Collected with Part One
ISBN	ISBN 978-4-02-264692-7	Collected with Part One

Marquis Verenis—he's a powerful Noble...he's in possession of antimatter technology...and he's three hundred million dalas in debt to Old El, the lender of last resort out on the Frontier!

The vampire lord put up his castle as collateral, but not a single collection agent dispatched by El had returned, so an outside consultant named D, was asked to come instead. But it turned out the Marquis wasn't the only one who owed the financier big time. Yet still, he would much rather kill Old El than pay up the sum. The debtors mean that there is deadly trouble ahead for D, even if they were humans.

Originally announced with the working title D – Ancient Shadows (D―古よりの翳, D – Koyori no Kage).

=== Sylvia's Road Home ===
Publication Details

	Japanese	English
Title	Vampire Hunter 26: D – Sylvia's Road Home (吸血鬼ハンター26 D―シルビアの帰る道, Banpaia Hantā 26: D – Shirubia no Kaeru Michi)	Vampire Hunter D Volume 31: Sylvia's Road Home
Date	August 7, 2013	TBA
ISBN	ISBN 978-4-02-264712-2	Not available

While passing through the forest of the Frontier, D rescues a brother and sister under attack. The sister is a "Returner"—someone who had been dismissed from the castle of the Noble she worked for—and was being assaulted by the villagers of her hometown, who feared her as a "pseudo-vampire." To make matters worse, the son of the Noble she served comes after her with a band of private soldiers, intending to take her back by force. Having taken on the role of their escort, can D safely deliver the siblings to their hometown?

=== Festival of the Nobility ===
Publication Details

	Japanese	English
Title	Vampire Hunter 27: D – Festival of the Nobility (吸血鬼ハンター27 D―貴族祭, Banpaia Hantā 27: D – Kizokusai)	Not available
Date	April 8, 2014	Not available
ISBN	ISBN 978-4-02-264736-8	Not available

In a mountain village of the Frontier Sector, a festival is held once every ten years to curse the Nobles and reenact the events of that time. This time, the guests invited are the descendants of the Hunters who defeated a Noble a hundred years ago—and the sole surviving daughter of that very Noble. However, along the journey, the descendants begin to fall one after another. D, who happens to encounter them, is chosen to act as their escort. What is the true identity of the unseen enemy? And what awaits at the village's ominous festival!?

=== Banquet in Purgatory ===
Publication Details

	Japanese	English
Title	Vampire Hunter 28: D – Banquet in Purgatory (吸血鬼ハンター28 D―夜会煉獄, Banpaia Hantā 28: D – Yakai Rengoku)	Not available
Date	November 20, 2014	Not available
ISBN	ISBN 978-4-02-264753-5	Not available

=== The Twisted Nobleman ===
Publication Details

	Japanese	English
Title	Vampire Hunter 29: D – The Twisted Nobleman (吸血鬼ハンター29 D―ひねくれた貴公子, Banpaia Hantā 29: D – Hinekureta Kikōshi)	Not available
Date	May 20, 2015	Not available
ISBN	ISBN 978-4-02-264780-1	Not available

=== The Wicked Beauty ===
Publication Details

	Japanese	English
Title	Vampire Hunter 30: D – The Wicked Beauty (吸血鬼ハンター30 D－美兇人, Banpaia Hantā 30: D – Bikiyōjin)	Not available
Date	February 5, 2016	Not available
ISBN	ISBN 978-4-02-264807-5	Not available

Originally announced with the working title D – The Mock Hunt (D－もどき狩り, D – Modokigari).

=== Lost Legion of the Nobility ===
Publication Details

	Japanese	English
Title	Vampire Hunter 31: D – Lost Legion of the Nobility (吸血鬼ハンター31 D－消えた貴族軍団, Banpaia Hantā 31: D – Kieta Kizoku Gundan)	Not available
Date	November 7, 2016	Not available
ISBN	ISBN 978-4-02-264831-0	Not available

=== The Five Assassins ===
Publication Details

	Japanese	English
Title	Vampire Hunter 32: D – The Five Assassins (吸血鬼ハンター32 D－五人の刺客, Banpaia Hantā 32: D – Gonin no Shikaku)	Not available
Date	September 7, 2017	Not available
ISBN	ISBN 978-4-02-264843-3	Not available

=== Cursed Demon Flight ===
Publication Details

	Japanese	English
Title	Vampire Hunter 33: D – Cursed Demon Flight (吸血鬼ハンター33 D－呪羅鬼飛行, Banpaia Hantā 33: D – Juraki Hikō)	Not available
Date	April 6, 2018	Not available
ISBN	ISBN 978-4-02-264884-6	Not available

=== Deadened City ===
Publication Details

	Japanese	English
Title	Vampire Hunter 34: D – Deadened City (吸血鬼ハンター34 D－死情都市, Banpaia Hantā 34: D – Shijō Toshi)	Not available
Date	September 7, 2018	Not available
ISBN	ISBN 978-4-02-264924-9	Not available

Originally serialized monthly in Issatsu no Hon magazine from November 2017 through August 2018.

=== The Visitor in Black ===
Publication Details

	Japanese	English
Title	Vampire Hunter 35: D – The Visitor in Black (吸血鬼ハンター35 D－黒い来訪者, Banpaia Hantā 35: D – Kuroi Raihōsha)	Not available
Date	June 7, 2019	Not available
ISBN	ISBN 978-4-02-264924-9	Not available

Originally announced with the working title D – The Visitor in Black (D－黒い訪問者, D – Kuroi Hōmonsha).

=== Mountain Demon ===
Publication Details

	Japanese	English
Title	Vampire Hunter 36: D – Mountain Demon (吸血鬼ハンター36 D－山嶽鬼, Banpaia Hantā 36: D – Sangakuki)	Not available
Date	October 7, 2019	Not available
ISBN	ISBN 978-4-02-264929-4	Not available

Originally serialized monthly in Issatsu no Hon magazine from September 2018 through June 2019.

=== Dark Witchsong ===
Publication Details

	Japanese	English
Title	Vampire Hunter 37: D – Dark Witchsong (吸血鬼ハンター37 D－闇の魔女歌, Banpaia Hantā 37: D – Yami no Majo Uta)	Not available
Date	July 7, 2020	Not available
ISBN	ISBN 978-4-02-264955-3	Not available

Originally serialized monthly in Issatsu no Hon magazine under the title D – Rivals in the Wind (D－龍虎風, D – Ryūkokaze) from July 2019 through May 2020.

=== The Assassins' Stronghold ===
Publication Details

	Japanese	English
Title	Vampire Hunter 38: D – The Assassins' Stronghold (吸血鬼ハンター38 D－暗殺者の要塞, Banpaia Hantā 38: D – Ansatsusha no Yōsai)	Not available
Date	February 5, 2021	Not available
ISBN	ISBN 978-4-02-264981-2	Not available

=== Demon Howl Expedition ===
Publication Details

	Japanese	English
Title	Vampire Hunter 39: D – Demon Howl Expedition (吸血鬼ハンター39 D－鬼哭旅, Banpaia Hantā 39: D – Kikoku Tabi)	Not available
Date	November 5, 2021	Not available
ISBN	ISBN 978-4-02-265015-3	Not available

Originally serialized monthly in Issatsu no Hon magazine from June 2020 through March 2021.

=== Bloodwind Trail ===
Publication Details

	Japanese	English
Title	Vampire Hunter 40: D – Bloodwind Trail (吸血鬼ハンター40 D－血風航路, Banpaia Hantā 40: D – Chifū Kōro)	Not available
Date	April 7, 2022	Not available
ISBN	ISBN 978-4-02-265039-9	Not available

Originally serialized monthly in Issatsu no Hon magazine from April 2021 through January 2022.

=== Dawnshadow Legion ===
Publication Details

	Japanese	English
Title	Vampire Hunter 41: D – Dawnshadow Legion (吸血鬼ハンター41 D－暁影魔団, Banpaia Hantā 41: D – Akikage Madan)	Not available
Date	April 10, 2023	Not available
ISBN	ISBN 978-4-02-265091-7	Not available

Originally serialized monthly in Issatsu no Hon magazine from February 2022 through November 2022.

=== Chronicle of the Mystic Battle in Demonvale ===
Publication Details

	Japanese	English
Title	Vampire Hunter 42: D – Chronicle of the Mystic Battle in Demonvale (吸血鬼ハンター42 D－魔王谷妖争記, Banpaia Hantā 42: D – Maōdani Yōtōki)	Not available
Date	February 7, 2024	Not available
ISBN	ISBN 978-4-02-265119-8	Not available

Originally serialized monthly in Issatsu no Hon magazine from December 2022 through October 2023.

=== Wicked Resurrection ===
Publication Details

	Japanese	English
Title	Vampire Hunter 43: D – Wicked Resurrection (吸血鬼ハンター43 D－凶の復活祭, Banpaia Hantā 43: D – Kyō no Fukkatsu-sai)	Not available
Date	January 8, 2025	Not available
ISBN	ISBN 978-4-02-265183-9	Not available

Originally serialized monthly in Issatsu no Hon magazine from November 2023 through August 2024.

=== Crimson Summer Procession ===
Publication Details

	Japanese	English
Title	Vampire Hunter 44: D – Crimson Summer Procession (吸血鬼ハンター44 D－紅い夏の道行き, Banpaia Hantā 44: D – Akai Natsu no Michiyuki)	Not available
Date	January 7, 2026	Not available
ISBN	ISBN 978-4-02-265219-5	Not available

Originally serialized monthly in Issatsu no Hon magazine from September 2024 through June 2025. The final volume to feature monochrome interior illustrations.

== Omnibus editions ==
=== Book One ===
Publication Details

	English
Title	Vampire Hunter D Omnibus: Book One
Date	October 26, 2021
ISBN	ISBN 1-5067-2530-9

Collects the first three volumes of the series: Vampire Hunter D, Raiser of Gales, and Demon Deathchase.

=== Book Two ===
Publication Details

	English
Title	Vampire Hunter D Omnibus: Book Two
Date	August 2, 2022
ISBN	ISBN 1-5067-3187-2

Collects volumes 4 through 6 of the series: Tale of the Dead Town, The Stuff of Dreams, and Pilgrimage of the Sacred and the Profane.

=== Book Three ===
Publication Details

	English
Title	Vampire Hunter D Omnibus: Book Three
Date	February 28, 2023
ISBN	ISBN 1-5067-3188-0

Collects volumes 7 through 9 of the series: Mysterious Journey to the North Sea Parts One and Two and The Rose Princess.

=== Book Four ===
Publication Details

	English
Title	Vampire Hunter D Omnibus: Book Four
Date	December 12, 2023
ISBN	ISBN 1-5067-3965-2

Collects volumes 10 through 12 of the series: Dark Nocturne, Pale Fallen Angel Parts One and Two, and Pale Fallen Angel Parts Three and Four.

=== Book Five ===
Publication Details

	English
Title	Vampire Hunter D Omnibus: Book Five
Date	April 16, 2024
ISBN	ISBN 978-1-5067-3966-3

Collects volumes 13 through 15 of the series: Twin-Shadowed Knight Parts One and Two, Dark Road Parts One and Two, and Dark Road Part Three.

=== Book Six ===
Publication Details

	English
Title	Vampire Hunter D Omnibus: Book Six
Date	August 13, 2024
ISBN	ISBN 1-5067-3967-9

Collects volumes 16 through 18 of the series: Tyrant's Stars Parts One and Two, Tyrant's Stars Parts Three and Four, and Fortress of the Elder God.

=== Book Seven ===
Publication Details

	English
Title	Vampire Hunter D Omnibus: Book Seven
Date	December 10, 2024
ISBN	ISBN 978-1-5067-4463-6

Collects volumes 19 through 21 of the series: Mercenary Road, Scenes From an Unholy War, and Record of the Blood Battle.

=== Book Eight ===
Publication Details

	English
Title	Vampire Hunter D Omnibus: Book Eight
Date	May 27, 2025
ISBN	ISBN 978-1-5067-4464-3

Collects volumes 22 through 24 of the series: White Devil Mountain Parts One and Two, Iriya the Berserker, and Throng of Heretics.

=== Book Nine ===
Publication Details

	English
Title	Vampire Hunter D Omnibus: Book Nine
Date	September 23, 2025
ISBN	ISBN 978-1-5067-4465-0

Collects volumes 25 through 27 of the series: Undead Island, Bedeviled Stagecoach, and Nightmare Village.

=== Book Ten ===
Publication Details

	English
Title	Vampire Hunter D Omnibus: Book Ten
Date	January 20, 2026
ISBN	ISBN 978-1-5067-5211-2

Collects volumes 28 through 30 of the series: The Tiger in Winter, Noble Front, and Gold Fiend Parts One and Two.

== Another Vampire Hunter series ==
=== The Noble Greylancer ===
Publication Details

	Japanese	English
Title	Another Vampire Hunter: The Noble Greylancer (吸血鬼ハンター / アナザー 貴族グレイランサー, Banpaia Hantā Anazā: Kizoku Gureiransā)	Noble V: Greylancer
Date	January 20, 2011 (hardcover); May 7, 2021 (paperback)	May 21, 2013
ISBN	ISBN 978-4-02-273960-5 (hardcover); ISBN 4-02-264992-5 (paperback)	ISBN 978-1-4215-5417-4

Set in the year 7001 of the Noble Calendar, during the early stages of the conflict between the Nobility and the Outer Space Beings, which would come to be known as the Three Thousand Years' War. It follows the exploits of Greylancer, a powerful warrior of the Nobility and Lord of the Northern Frontier Sector, as he battles the invading OSB and an anti-Noble faction, and gets caught up in a conspiracy involving the ruling Council and the rebel Mayerling.

=== Blood of a Hero ===
Publication Details

	Japanese	English
Title	Another Vampire Hunter: The Noble Greylancer – Blood of a Hero (吸血鬼ハンター / アナザー 貴族グレイランサー 英傑の血, Banpaia Hantā Anazā: Kizoku Gureiransā – Eiketsu no Chi)	Not available
Date	November 18, 2011 (hardcover); June 7, 2021 (paperback)	Not available
ISBN	ISBN 978-4-02-273979-7 (hardcover); ISBN 978-4-02-264998-0 (paperback)	Not available

Five years after the previous volume, a new enemy of the Nobility has arisen. The hero Sunhawk, after rampaging across the Frontier, has finally invaded Greylancer's Northern Frontier Sector. However a mysterious disease has claimed the lives of several Nobles who have fed on human blood, and the fearful Nobility has ordered Greylancer to infiltrate a free land known as the Twilight Zone in order to discover its source. Awaiting him are the malevolent OSB and a rebel Noble, along with the assassins who have joined him. Meanwhile, a conspiracy to place the entire Frontier under the sole rule of the Capital is revealed, and a noble begins to slaughter humans with toxic blood. The chaos leads Greylancer to the Nobility's Grand Ball, lance in hand. What will become of Sunhawk, and what will come of the incident?

== Novellas ==
=== Dark Nocturne ===
Publication Details

	Japanese	English
Title	Vampire Hunter Anthology: D – Dark Nocturne (吸血鬼ハンター別巻 D―昏い夜想曲, Banpaia Hantā Bekkan: D – Kurai Nokutān)	Vampire Hunter D Volume 10: Dark Nocturne
Date	January 31, 1992 (Sonorama Bunko); January 7, 2008 (Sonorama Selection)	March 26, 2008
ISBN	ISBN 4-257-76586-0 (Sonorama Bunko); ISBN 4-02-265508-9 (Sonorama Selection)	ISBN 1-59582-132-5

Vampire Hunter Anthology: D – Dark Nocturne, published between Vampire Hunter 7: D – Mysterious Journey to the North Sea and Vampire Hunter 8: D – The Rose Princess, is a supplemental volume that exists outside of the main numbering scheme and collects the following novellas, which were originally serialized in Asahi Sonorama's sci-fi magazine Shishi-oh from October 1991 through February 1992:

==== Dark Nocturne ====
D – Dark Nocturne (D―昏い夜想曲, D – Kurai Nokutān): The first tale concerns Ry, a young man who goes to Anise village seeking the haunting song he'd heard from his father on his deathbed. Many vampires had been entertained at a chateau there until about 200 years earlier, and they lured young men and women in their twenties there with a song no one else could duplicate. That same song had been heard again 20 years before our story begins. On his way to Anise, Ry encounters Price and his cohorts Bijima and Kurt. Price heard the ghostly tune while in his mother's womb, and can imitate it. But he and his lackeys seem to be up to no good. D appears in time to save the boy. The female mayor of the village has hired the Vampire Hunter, among others, to find out what's going on at the chateau, and to see if the vampires have returned. D sees his life complicated by Amne, the headstrong daughter of the innkeeper where D is lodging and just the sort of cat curiosity so often kills. Originally published in the October and November 1991 issues of Shishi-oh.

==== An Ode to Imagined Fall ====
D – An Ode to Imagined Fall (D―想秋譜, D – Sōshūfu): The second story takes place in a village called "Shirley's Door", which is famous for its beauty in fall. A centenarian known as "Helga of the Red Basket" hires D when she foresees trouble in the swamp near her home—a place where the vampiric Nobility once dwelled. This particular village long made it a practice to offer up one of extraordinary beauty so that everyone else might be spared, and Mayor Murtock is willing to continue the tradition to preserve the peace. The real problem there is that his son, Lyle, happens to be in love with the intended sacrifice—a girl named Cecile. D has met the pair on his way into town, so you can imagine he's not about to sit back and do nothing while humans turn on humans. Originally published in the December 1991 and January 1992 issues of Shishi-oh.

==== Legend of the War Fiends ====
D – Legend of the War Fiends (D―戦鬼伝, D – Senkiden): The final section begins in a massive castle carved from a mountain in the center of an "Armageddon Zone"—an area with a radius of 2000 km left barren by a battle between two vampire clans that lasted 5000 years. The castle has a nuclear generator that produces 50 million megawatts of power per hour, which for the last 2000 years has gone into creating Dynus, a 10-foot-tall (3.0 m) man with a somewhat childish demeanor. He is one clan's "last strike", and apparently they weren't the only ones with that foresight. A girl named Raya who has been sold into the entertainment business in the Capital is the other side's sleeper agent. Her witch-like powers come from genetic encoding done centuries earlier by other vampires to stage this one last battle. D is on the scene to protect Raya until she leaves for her new job, but the strange visitors to the area are apparently there to watch the fireworks and see which of the extinct clans triumphs in the end. The two ill-fated individuals not only befriend D, but they also grow quite fond of each other, but their fate was decided millennia earlier. Originally published in the February 1992 issue of Shishi-oh.

== Short stories ==
=== Armageddon ===
D – Armageddon (D―ハルマゲドン, D – Harumagedon): Originally published in Yoshitaka Amano's 1984 artbook Maten, and later collected in Kikuchi's short story collection The Chaser and in Vampire Hunter "D" Reader's Guide. The short story offers a brief glimpse into the final showdown between D and his father, the Sacred Ancestor.

=== Portrait of Yzobel ===
Portrait of Yzobel (イゾベルの肖像画, Izoberu no Shōzōga): Originally published in 1997 in the artbook Coffin – Vampire Hunter D as Portrait of Ixobel. An English translation by Kevin Leahy was included in the original Japanese edition of the artbook, making it the first piece of Vampire Hunter D literature to be published English. It was later collected in Vampire Hunter "D" Reader's Guide, and retranslated by Kevin Leahy as Portrait of Yzobel for the English edition of the guidebook.

=== Village in Fog ===
D – Village in Fog (D―霧の村, D – Kiri no Mura): Originally published in 2000 in the artbook Yoshitaka Amano Picture Collection – Vampire Hunter "D", and collected in Vampire Hunter "D" Reader's Guide.

=== The Castle's Resident ===
D – The Castle's Resident (D―城の住人, D – Shiro no Jūnin): Originally given as a prize to a fan as a handwritten manuscript at Kikuchi's second annual "Bonenkai" year-end party in Shinjuku, it was later published in 2001 in Vampire Hunter "D" Reader's Guide.

=== On the Night Road ===
D – On the Night Road (D―夜の街道にて, D – Yoru no Kaidōnite): A short story written exclusively to be published in 2001 in Vampire Hunter "D" Reader's Guide.

=== Message from Cecile ===
Message from Cecile (セシルからの伝言, Sesshiru Kara no Dengon): Published in 2005 in Vampire Hunter D – Audio Drama CD Box. At the time the only Vampire Hunter D short story that had yet to be published in English. Adapted into a multi-issue comic book series Vampire Hunter D: Message from Mars.

=== BB Project ===
BB Project (BBプロジェクト, BB Purojekuto): Published in 2006 in Dream World Temptation: Hideyuki Kikuchi's Complete Works (夢幻世界の誘惑 菊地秀行全仕事, Mugen Sekai no Yūwaku: Kikuchi Hideyuki Zenshigoto). Takes place a thousand years after the events depicted in Armageddon. Despite defeating the Sacred Ancestor, D is hired to slay a fellow vampire hunter who has been afflicted with the curse of the Nobility. He soon uncovers the Blue Bloods Project, a secretive research program through which humans are attempting to transform themselves into a new generation of the vampiric Nobility. Recognizing that his father's death didn't settle things, D ruthlessly dispatches them and continues his seemingly endless journey.

=== The Wanderer's Ship ===
The Wanderer's Ship (さすらい人の船, Sasuraijin no Fune): Published in the New York Anime Festival 2008 Official Guide Book. One of three original manuscripts written by Hideyuki Kikuchi which have been raffled off to fans, along with publication rights, at his semi-annual fan gatherings in Japan. The recipient of this particular manuscript, Hitomi Yasue, decided to share the story with an English audience, hoping to expose more English readers to the novel series. It was subsequently translated by Kevin Leahy and published in the New York Anime Festival 2008 Official Guide Book, and a live reading by professional voice actors was also performed at the convention. To date, it has only been released in English.

=== Voyage Through Strange Waters ===
D – Voyage Through Strange Waters (D―妖水航, Yōsuikō): A short story manuscript distributed exclusively to attendees of Kikuchi's houseboat tour in November 2011.

=== Siren of the Cape ===
Siren of the Cape (岬のセイレーン, Misaki no Seirēn): Published on February 12, 2021, in Masaya Yamaguchi's A Sweet and Painful Kiss: Vampire Compilation, an anthology celebrating the 99th birthday of the late Christopher Lee, along with an essay written by Kikuchi titled Vampire Hunter K's Vampire Movie Recommendations.

== Other works ==
=== Coffin – Vampire Hunter D ===
Publication Details

	Japanese	English
Title	Coffin – Vampire Hunter D (かんおけ―吸血鬼ハンターD, Kan'oke – Banpaia Hantā D)	Coffin: The Art of Vampire Hunter D
Date	November 1997	October 4, 2006
ISBN	ISBN 4-257-03500-5	ISBN 1-59582-061-2

Coffin is a retrospective of Yoshitaka Amano's work on the Vampire Hunter D series up to the release of D – Pale Fallen Angel 4, and includes nearly all of the Vampire Hunter illustrations, prints, and sketches produced in that 14-year period by Amano, as well as an original short story, Portrait of Yzobel, by Kikuchi.

=== Yoshitaka Amano Art Collection: Vampire Hunter "D" ===
Publication Details

	Japanese	English
Title	Yoshitaka Amano Art Collection: Vampire Hunter "D" (天野喜孝画集 吸血鬼ハンター"D", Yoshitaka Amano Gashū Banpaia Hantā "D")	Yoshitaka Amano: The Collected Art of Vampire Hunter D
Date	September 20, 2000	December 12, 2007
ISBN	ISBN 4-257-03606-0	ISBN 1-59582-110-4

=== Vampire Hunter "D" Reader's Guide ===
Publication Details

	Japanese	English
Title	Vampire Hunter "D" Reader's Guide (吸血鬼ハンター"D"読本, Banpaia Hantā "D" Dokuhon)	Vampire Hunter D Reader's Guide
Date	June 2001 (Sonorama Bunko); January 21, 2008 (Sonorama Selection)	September 21, 2010
ISBN	ISBN 4-257-03546-3 (Sonorama Bunko); ISBN 978-4-02-213818-7 (Sonorama Selection)	ISBN 978-1-59582-111-9

Billed as "the essential companion to the world of Vampire Hunter D", this guidebook includes rare artwork and sketches, a behind-the-scenes look at Kikuchi's writing process, a collection of short stories, and an extensive glossary of characters and terminology appearing in the series up to and including D – Dark Road. Omitted from the English release, the original Japanese edition also includes commentaries and essays, a look at Vampire Hunter D: Bloodlust and other contemporary vampire media, and a discussion between Kikuchi and Yoshiaki Kawajiri. The English edition's glossary is expanded to nearly 200 pages, however, and more closely resembles an encyclopedia.

=== Yoshiaki Kawajiri's "Vampire Hunter D" Storyboard Collection ===
Publication Details

	Japanese	English
Title	Yoshiaki Kawajiri's "Vampire Hunter D" Storyboard Collection (川尻善昭「バンパイアハンターD」絵コンテ集)	Not available
Date	April 30, 2001	Not available
ISBN	ISBN 4-257-03633-8 (Asahi Sonorama)	Not available

This 647 page art book contains Kawajiri's storyboards created for Vampire Hunter D: Bloodlust.

=== Vampire Hunter Tale: The Hunter in White ===
Vampire Hunter Tale: The Hunter in White (吸血鬼ハンター異聞 白い狩人, Banpaia Hantā Ibun: Shiroi Karyūdo) is a short manga written by Hideyuki Kikuchi and illustrated by Ai Kozaki that was published in 2004 by Kawade Shobō Shinsha in Kawade Dream Mook: Hideyuki Kikuchi Special Edition. It depicts a handsome vampire hunter saving a pair of sisters fleeing from a Noble and his hunting hounds. The unnamed hunter has dark skin and dreadlocks, is clad in elegant white attire including a cloak and cavalier hat, and wields a shashka – an inversion of D's general appearance.

=== Vampire Hunter Aside: Dhampir Hunting ===
Publication Details

	Japanese	English
Title	Vampire Hunter Aside: Dhampir Hunting (吸血鬼ハンター外伝 ダンピール狩り, Banpaia Hantā Gaiden: Danpīru Gari)	Not available
Date	February 20, 2015	Not available
ISBN	ISBN 4-02-268309-0	Not available

A spinoff light novel written by Yūki Asakawa with story supervision from Hideyuki Kikuchi, illustrated by Yukito, and published by Asahi under the Asahi Aero Paperback imprint. The story deviates from the established lore of the main series and depicts a beautiful female Dhampir Hunter named Olivia Cross, who is hired by a Noble to eliminate a group of vampiric half breeds who have been kidnapping and murdering young women in his territory. Though the novel sets up a potential ongoing series, it was not continued.

=== Vampire Hunter D: The Complete Illustration Collection ===
Publication Details

	Japanese	English
Title	Vampire Hunter D: The Complete Illustration Collection (吸血鬼ハンターD全挿絵集, Banpaia Hantā D: Zen Sashieshū)	Not available
Date	January 7, 2026	Not available
ISBN	ISBN 9-784-02-258721-3	Not available

An oversized artbook published alongside Vampire Hunter 44: D – Crimson Summer Procession to commemorate the conclusion of Yoshitaka Amano's interior illustration work for the series after 43 years. It collects all 340 interior illustrations Amano produced for the series from 1983 to 2026, including several previously unpublished pieces. It also features three manuscripts penned by Yoshitaka Amano ("My Encounter with Vampire Hunter D," "D Was Always There Beside Me," and "Beyond the Concept of Illustration") and a foreword by Hideyuki Kikuchi ("An Art Exhibition of Enchanting Beauty, Melancholic Beauty, Monstrous Beauty, and the Beauty of Darkness"). To celebrate the dual release, special promotions were held at select bookstores in Japan with gifts such as art cards and stickers, and raffles to win autographed art cards.
