= Vampire Hunter D: Mysterious Journey to the North Sea =

Novel by Hideyuki Kikuchi

Vampire Hunter D: Mysterious Journey to the North Sea, Part One
- Cover of the English edition of 'Vampire Hunter D: Mysterious Journey to the North Sea, Part One'
- Author: Hideyuki Kikuchi
- Original title: D - Mysterious Journey to the North Sea (First Half) (D-北海魔行(上), 'D - Hokkai-Makō (Jō)')
- Translator: Kevin Leahy
- Illustrator: Yoshitaka Amano
- Language: Japanese
- Series: Vampire Hunter D Vol. 7
- Genre: Science fiction, Fantasy, Light novel
- Published: 1988 (Asahi Sonorama (JP); 2007 (DH Press (USA)
- Publication place: Japan
- Media type: Print (Paperback)
- Pages: 280 (USA); 248 (JP)
- ISBN: 1-59582-012-4 (USA); ISBN 4-257-76225-X (JP)
- Preceded by: Pilgrimage of the Sacred and the Profane
- Followed by: The Rose Princess

Part Two
- Cover of the English edition of 'Vampire Hunter D: Mysterious Journey to the North Sea, Part Two'
- Author: Hideyuki Kikuchi
- Original title: D - Mysterious Journey to the North Sea (Second Half) (D-北海魔行(下), 'D - Hokkai-Makō (Ge)')
- Published: 1989 (Asahi Sonorama (Japan) ) 2007 (DH Press (United States) )
- Pages: (United States) 224 (Japan) 345
- ISBN: 1-59582-108-2 (USA); ISBN 4-257-76438-4 (JP)

Vampire Hunter D: Mysterious Journey to the North Sea is a Japanese novel by Hideyuki Kikuchi. It was first published in Japan in 1988.

== Book description (Part One) ==
"A hero, no matter how reluctant, can never refuse the last request of a beautiful girl."

When a young woman travelling across the scarred wastelands is murdered over the possession of a strange jewel, she entrusts the gem, with her final breath, to the mysterious Vampire Hunter known as D, and charges him with a desperate mission—to deliver the priceless stone to her sister, far off in a fishing village on the shores of the North Sea.

D's journey is made ever more perilous by the motley unsavory scoundrels enlisted by the girl's murderer, who will stop at nothing to claim the jewel. Determined the hunter will not reach his destination, the villains are relentless in their pursuit, one of them harboring a secret, deadly agenda of his own.

== Book description (Part Two) ==
"Vampire lore dictates that the creatures of the night shun the sea... or do they?"

The picturesque coastal town of Florence was known for millennia as a pleasure resort for the Nobility. As retribution for their decadence, the cruel and beautiful vampire inhabitants were "punished," driven out more than a thousand years ago by a solitary traveler in black. Only one—Baron Meinster—refused to leave, only to be thrown to the waves by the mysterious assassin.

Summoned to contemporary Florence by Su-In, sister of a murdered village girl, the enigmatic Vampire Hunter D discovers a vampire curse ravaging the town's human inhabitants. The plague apparently originating, impossibly, from the unforgiving sea—could it be Meinster's Revenge?

== Plot summary ==
The 17-year-old Wu-Lin is traveling from the fishing village of Florence to Cronenberg to have a strange jewel appraised. No less than three people try to steal it from her: the young commoner Toto, an old artist named Professor Krolock, and the grotesque Gilligan, an obscenely overweight gangland boss in a custom exoskeleton. He has Wu-Lin killed, but her dying request of D is that he bring the gem back to her older sister Su-In in their village on the north sea.

Gilligan is determined to have the gem. He dispatches five mysterious individuals with the promise that the one who brings it to him will get all he possesses. This group consists of such colorful characters as Shin the Puppetman, King Egbert, Undiscernible Twin, and Reminiscence Samon. Also tailing D from Cronenberg is handsome Glen, a warrior and "seeker of knowledge" who wants to kill the Vampire Hunter because he's the only thing he has ever feared.

Everyone arrives in Florence just as its short, week-long summer is about to begin. Millennia ago, the area had been a resort for the Nobility until the day, about 1000 years ago, when a traveler in black arrived and punished the cruel vampire residents. Only Baron Meinster refused to leave, and the traveler threw him into the sea. Now, for the past few years, the village's summer has been marred by vampire attacks -- "Meinster's Revenge." Su-In hired D because something particularly distressing is going on here. Though the world knows that the Nobility has difficulty with rain or flowing water, the vampire in Florence seems to be coming from the sea.

As the plot thickens, the five mercenaries hired by Gilligan resort to betraying each other and using dirty tactics to subdue D. Glen is able to dominate Simon into a love-hate-love relationship which leads to him becoming a noble, a desperate act following a near-death at the hands of a jealous King Egbert. Throughout the second half of the story, the bead is lost and claimed by numerous characters, finally falling into the hands of Dr. Krolock himself. The Doctor is able to crack the secret of the jewel and obtains Nobility-like status but is easily felled by D's blade.

Everything comes to a head when D finally defeats Glen and Meinster's abilities are revealed. Four summers ago, Su-in met a man she fell in love with, but she killed him when he tried to make her commit a terrible deed. His body was dumped into the sea, becoming the vessel for the defeated Noble. This event resulted in "Meinster" having no recollection of his 'true' self. In the end, D prevails, and Su-in returns to her happy life as a teacher for the village's children, with help from her friend Dwight and a reformed Toto. The latter claims to have seen the Hunter smile before departing.

At the close of the story, Samon confronts D. Wounded, and near death, the Vampire Hunter known as D promptly defeats her.
