= Animetal discography =

Band discography

- Studio albums: 8
- Live albums: 3
- Compilation albums: 3
- Singles: 10
- Video albums: 4 (Note: This includes the music video compilation albums and concert DVDs.)
- Karaoke albums: 2

The discography of the Japanese band Animetal consists of eight studio albums, three compilation albums, and ten singles released since 1996.

== Albums ==
=== Studio albums ===
Title	Album details	Peak chart positions	Certifications	Sales
Title	Album details	JPN Oricon	Certifications	Sales
Animetal Marathon	Released: March 21, 1997; Label: Sony Records; Formats: CD			
Animetal Marathon II	Released: February 21, 1998; Label: Sony Records; Formats: 2CD			
Animetal Marathon III	Released: October 21, 1998; Label: Sony Records; Formats: CD			
Animetal Marathon IV	Released: September 12, 2001; Label: Cutting Edge; Formats: CD			
Animetal Marathon V	Released: June 25, 2003; Label: VAP; Formats: CD			
Animetal Marathon VI	Released: September 22, 2004; Label: VAP; Formats: CD			
Animetal Marathon VII	Released: October 21, 2005; Label: VAP; Formats: CD	122		
Decade of Bravehearts	Released: August 2, 2006; Label: VAP; Formats: CD+DVD	110		

=== Karaoke albums ===
Title	Album details	Peak chart positions	Sales
Title	Album details	JPN Oricon	Sales
Animetal Marathon no Karaoke	Released: April 21, 1997; Label: Sony Records; Formats: CD		
Animetal Marathon II no Karaoke	Released: March 21, 1998; Label: Sony Records; Formats: CD		

=== Live albums ===
Title	Album details	Peak chart positions	Sales
Title	Album details	Oricon	Sales
Complete First Live	Released: October 1, 1999; Label: SME Records; Formats: 2CD		
Complete Last Live	Released: October 1, 1999; Label: SME Records; Formats: 2CD		
The Animetal: Re-Birth Heroes	Released: June 23, 2004; Label: VAP; Formats: CD		

=== Compilations ===
Title	Album details	Peak chart positions	Certifications	Sales
Title	Album details	Oricon	Certifications	Sales
Best of Animetal	Released: May 21, 1998; Label: Sony Records; Formats: CD			
And Then... The Legend of Animetal	Released: October 12, 2011; Label: GT Music; Formats: 2CD, digital	139		
"—" denotes a recording that did not chart or was not released in that territory.

=== International releases ===
Title	Album details
This Is Japanimetal Marathon	Released: April 7, 1998; Label: Sony Music Entertainment Asia; Formats: CD

== Singles ==
List of singles, with selected chart positions
Title	Year	Peak chart positions	Certifications	Sales	Album
Title	Year	JPN Oricon	Certifications	Sales	Album
"Animetal"	1996	—			Best of Animetal
"This Is Animetal"	1997	—			Best of Animetal
"Tokusatsu de Ikō!"	1997	—			Best of Animetal
"Animetal Summer"	1997	—			Best of Animetal
"Sentimetal"	1997	—			Best of Animetal
"Shukuteki Kenzan!"	1997	—			Animetal Marathon II
"The Juppongatana"	1997	—			Animetal Marathon II
"Towa no Mirai"	1997	—			Animetal Marathon II
"Yūki no Akashi"	1998	—			Best of Animetal
"For the Bravehearts Only!"	2006	—			Non-album single
"—" denotes a recording that did not chart or was not released in that territory.

== Videography ==
=== Live video albums ===
List of media, with selected chart positions
Title	Year	Peak positions	
Title	Year	JPN DVD	JPN Blu-ray
Animetalive	Released: May 21, 1997; Label: Sony Records; Formats: VHS, DVD	—	—
The Fourth Marathon	Released: November 29, 2002; Label: Daiki Sound; Formats: DVD	—	—
The Psycho Marathon	Released: June 23, 2004; Label: VAP; Formats: DVD	—	—
Songs for Everlasting Future	Released: December 21, 2006; Label: VAP; Formats: DVD	—	—
"—" denotes a recording that did not chart or was not released in that territory.

== Animetal Lady ==
=== Albums ===
==== Studio albums ====
Title	Album details	Peak chart positions	Certifications	Sales
Title	Album details	JPN Oricon	Certifications	Sales
Animetal Lady Marathon	Released: February 21, 1998; Label: Sony Records; Formats: CD			
Animetal Lady Marathon II	Released: April 10, 2002; Label: Cutting Edge; Formats: CD			

==== Karaoke albums ====
Title	Album details	Peak chart positions	Sales
Title	Album details	JPN Oricon	Sales
Animetal Lady Marathon no Karaoke	Released: March 21, 1998; Label: Sony Records; Formats: CD		

=== Singles ===
List of singles, with selected chart positions
Title	Year	Peak chart positions	Certifications	Sales	Album
Title	Year	JPN Oricon	Certifications	Sales	Album
"Animetal Lady Sanjō!"	1997	—			Best of Animetal
"Animetal Lady Kenzan!"	1997	—			Best of Animetal
"—" denotes a recording that did not chart or was not released in that territory.

== Animetal USA ==
=== Albums ===
==== Studio albums ====
Title	Album details	Peak chart positions	Certifications	Sales
Title	Album details	JPN Oricon	Certifications	Sales
Animetal USA	Released: October 12, 2011; Label: SME Records; Formats: CD, digital	18		
Animetal USA W	Released: June 6, 2012; Label: SME Records; Formats: CD, CD+DVD, digital	17		

=== Singles ===
List of singles, with selected chart positions
Title	Year	Peak chart positions	Certifications	Sales	Album
Title	Year	JPN Oricon	Certifications	Sales	Album
"Give Lee Give Lee Rock Lee" (Collaboration with Hironobu Kageyama)	2012	179			Animetal USA W
"—" denotes a recording that did not chart or was not released in that territory.

== Animetal the Second ==
=== Albums ===
==== Studio albums ====
Title	Album details	Peak chart positions	Certifications	Sales
Title	Album details	JPN Oricon	Certifications	Sales
Animetal the Second	Released: March 25, 2015; Label: SME Records; Formats: CD, digital	137		
Blizzard of Animetal the Second	Released: April 16, 2016; Label: SME Records; Formats: CD, digital	140		
