= And Then... The Legend of Animetal =

Compilation album by Animetal
- Released: October 12, 2011
- Recorded: 1996–2006
- Genres: Heavy metal; anison
- Language: Japanese
- Label: GT Music

Animetal chronology
Decade of Bravehearts (2006)	And Then... The Legend of Animetal (2011)

And Then... The Legend of Animetal (そして伝説へ...THE LEGEND of ANIMETAL, Soshite Densetsu e... Za Rejendo obu Animetaru) is a compilation album by Japanese novelty heavy metal band Animetal, released through GT Music on October 12, 2011, to commemorate the band's 15th anniversary. The two-disc album includes the band's singles, plus medleys mixed from their previous studio albums.

The album peaked at No. 139 on Oricon's weekly albums chart.

== Track listing ==
All tracks are arranged by Animetal, except where indicated.

Disc 1
No.	Title	Arrangement	Length
1.	"This Is Animetal -Edited Version from "Animetal Marathon"-: "Uchū Senkan Yamato" (宇宙戦艦ヤマト) (Space Battleship Yamato); "Umi no Triton" (海のトリトン, Umi no Toriton) (Triton of the Sea); "Ore wa Great Mazinger"" (おれはグレートマジンガー, Ore wa Gurēto Majingā; "I Am Great Mazinger") (Great Mazinger); "Tatakae! Polymar" (戦え！ポリマー, Tatakae! Porimā; "Fight! Polymar") (Hurricane Polymar); "Tiger Mask" (タイガーマスク, Taigā Masuku) (Tiger Mask); "Babel II" (バビル2世, Babiru Nisei) (Babel II); "Taga Tame ni" (誰がために; "For Whose Sake") (Cyborg 009)"		6:41
2.	"Animetal Marathon Medley (アニメタル・マラソン・メドレー, Animetaru Marason Medorē): "Tekkaman no Uta" (テッカマンの歌; "Song of Tekkaman") (Tekkaman: The Space Knight); "Voltes V no Uta" (ボルテスVの歌, Borutesu Faibu no Uta; "Song of Voltes V") (Chōdenji Machine Voltes V); "Dash! Machine Hayabusa" (ダッシュ！マシンハヤブサ, Dasshu! Mashin Hayabusa) (Machine Hayabusa); "Tobe! Gundam" (Note: Incorporates Scorpions' "Blackout") (翔べ！ガンダム, Tobe! Gundamu; "Fly! Gundam") (Mobile Suit Gundam); "Shippu Xabungle" (疾風ザブングル, Shippū Zabungaru; "Gale Wind Xabungle") (Combat Mecha Xabungle); "Tobe! Grendizer" (とべ！グレンダイザー, Tobe! Gurendazā; "Fly! Grendizer") (UFO Robo Grendizer); "Kōtetsu Jeeg no Uta" (Note: Incorporates Deep Purple's "Burn") (鋼鉄ジーグのうた, Kōtetsu Jīgu no Uta; "Song of Steel Jeeg") (Steel Jeeg)"		7:58
3.	"Tokusatsu de Ikō! (特撮でいこう！; "Let's Go with Tokusatsu!"): "Let's Go!! Rider Kick (レッツゴー！！ライダーキック, Rettsu Gō!! Raidā Kikku) (Kamen Rider); "Kamen Rider no Uta" (仮面ライダーのうた, Kamen Raidā no Uta; "Song of Kamen Rider") (Kamen Rider); "Tatakae! Kamen Rider V3" (戦え！仮面ライダーV3, Tatakae! Kamen Raidā Bui Surī; "Fight! Kamen Rider V3") (Kamen Rider V3); "Setup! Kamen Rider X" (セタップ！仮面ライダーX, Setappu! Kamen Raidā Ekkusu) (Kamen Rider X); "Amazon Rider Koko ni Ari" (アマゾンライダーここにあり, Amazon Raidā Koko ni Ari; "Amazon Rider Is Here") (Kamen Rider Amazon); "Kamen Rider Stronger no Uta" (仮面ライダーストロンガーのうた, Kamen Raidā Sutorongā no Uta; "Song of Kamen Rider Stronger") (Kamen Rider Stronger); "Moero! Kamen Rider" (燃えろ！仮面ライダー, Moero! Kamen Raidā; "Burn! Kamen Rider") (Kamen Rider (Skyrider))"		6:44
4.	"Animetal Lady Sanjō! (アニメタル・レディー参上！, Animetaru Redī Sanjō!; "Animetal Lady Is Here"): "Majokko Megu-chan" (魔女っ子メグちゃん; "Little Meg the Witch Girl") (Majokko Megu-chan); "Mahōtsukai Sally" (魔法使いサリー, Mahōtsukai Sarī) (Sally the Witch); "Hana no Ko Lunlun" (花の子ルンルン, Hana no Ko Runrun; "Lunlun the Flower Child") (Hana no Ko Lunlun); "Fushigi na Melmo" (ふしぎなメルモ, Fushigi na Merumo) (Fushigi na Melmo); "Magic Mako-chan" (魔法のマコちゃん, Mahō no Makochan) (Mahō no Mako-chan); Majokko Tickle" (魔女っ子チックル, Majokko Chikkuru; "Magical Girl Tickle") (Majokko Tickle); "Cutie Honey" (キューティーハニー, Kyūtī Hanī) (Cutie Honey)"	Animetal Lady	7:12
5.	"Animetal Summer (アニメタル・サマー, Animetaru Samā): "Ike Ike Hyūma" (行け行け飛雄馬; "Go Go Hyuma") (Star of the Giants); "Kimi wa Nanika ga Dekiru" (君は何かができる; "What Can I Do?") (Captain); "Ganbare Dokaben" (がんばれドカベン; "Win, Dokaben") (Dokaben); "Apache Yakyūgun" (Note: Incorporates Iron Maiden's "Aces High") (アパッチ野球軍, Apatchi Yakyūgun; "Apache Baseball Army") (Apache Yakyūgun); "Ōja! Samurai Giants" (王者！侍ジャイアンツ, Ōja! Samurai Jaiantsu; "Monarch! Samurai Giants") (Samurai Giants); "Kaze ni Nare!" (風になれ！; "With the Wind!") (Ganbare Genki); "Ashita no Joe" (あしたのジョー, Ashita no Jō; "Tomorrow's Joe") (Ashita no Joe)"		10:18
6.	"Animetal Lady Kenzan! (アニメタル・レディー見参！, Animetaru Redī Kenzan!; "Animetal Lady Has Been Found!"): "Candy Candy" (キャンディ・キャンディ, Kyandi Kyandi) (Candy Candy); "Oshiete" (Note: Guitar riff is loosely based on Led Zeppelin's "Immigrant Song") (おしえて; "Teach Me") (Heidi, Girl of the Alps); "Sōgen no Marco" (Note: Ending incorporates Whitesnake's "Fool for Your Loving") (草原のマルコ, Sōgen no Maruko; "Marco's Grassland") (3000 Leagues in Search of Mother); "Attack No. 1" (アタックNo.1, Atakku Nanbā Wan) (Attack No. 1); "Minashigo Hutch" (みなしごハッチ, Minashigo Hatchi) (The Adventures of Hutch the Honeybee); "Leo no Uta" (レオのうた, Reo no Uta; "Song of Leo") (Kimba the White Lion); "Sukisuki Song" (Note: Incorporates Queen's "We Will Rock You" and the keyboard intro of Journey's "Separate Ways (Worlds Apart)") (すきすきソング, Sukisuki Songu) (Himitsu no Akko-chan)"	Animetal Lady	9:47
7.	"Sentimetal (センチメタル, Senchimetaru): "Kyō mo Doko kade Devilman" (今日もどこかでデビルマン, Kyō mo Doko kade Debiruman; "Devilman Is Somewhere Today") (Devilman); "Ike! Combattler V" (行け！コン・バトラーV, Ike! Konbatorā Bui; "Ike! Combattler V") (Chōdenji Robo Combattler V); "Lupin Sansei Sono Ichi" (ルパン三世その1, Rupan Sansei Sono Ichi; "Lupin the Third 1") (Lupin the Third Part I); "Makka na Scarf" (真赤なスカーフ, Makka na Sukāfu; "Scarlet Scarf") (Space Battleship Yamato); "Minashiji no Ballad" (みなし児のバラード, Minashiji no Barādo; "Children's Ballad") (Tiger Mask); "Ai Senshi" (Note: Incorporates Iron Maiden's "The Number of the Beast") (哀・戦士; "Soldiers of Sorrow") (Mobile Suit Gundam II: Soldiers of Sorrow)"		8:11
8.	"Animetal Marathon II Medley (アニメタル・マラソンII・メドレー, Animetaru Marason Tsū Medorē): "Go Go Kikaider" (ゴーゴー・キカイダー, Gō Gō Kikaidā) (Android Kikaider); "Kikaider 01" (キカイダー01, Kikaidā Zero Wan) (Kikaider 01); "Robot Keiji" (ロボット刑事, Robotto Keiji) (Robot Detective); "Bokura no Barom-1" (ぼくらのバロム1, Bokura no Baromu Wan; "Our Barom-1") (Barom-1); "Jigoku no Zubat" (地獄のズバット, Jigoku no Zubatto; "Zubat of Hell") (Kaiketsu Zubat); "Uchū Keiji Gavan" (Note: Initial and final guitar riffs are based on Yngwie Malmsteen's "Rising Force") (宇宙刑事ギャバン, Uchū Keiji Gyaban) (Space Sheriff Gavan); Himitsu Sentai Gorenger (秘密戦隊ゴレンジャー, Himitsu Sentai Gorenjā; "Secret Squadron Gorenger") (Himitsu Sentai Gorenger)"		7:17
9.	"Yūki no Akashi (勇気の証; "Proof of Courage")"		3:14
10.	"Towa no Mirai (永遠の未来; "Eternal Future")"		5:11
Total length:			72:33

Disc 2
No.	Title	Arrangement	Length
1.	"Animetal Marathon III Medley (アニメタル・マラソンIII・メドレー, Animetaru Marason Surī Medorē): "Ultraman no Uta" (ウルトラマンの歌, Urutoraman no Uta; "Song of Ultraman") (Ultraman); "Ultraseven no Uta" (ウルトラセブンの歌, Urutorasebun no Uta; "Song of Ultraseven") (Ultraseven); "Kaette Kita Ultraman" (帰ってきたウルトラマン, Kaettekita Urutoraman) (The Return of Ultraman); "Ultraman Ace" (ウルトラマンA, Urutoraman Ēsu) (Ultraman Ace); "Ultraman Taro" (ウルトラマンタロウ, Urutoraman Tarō) (Ultraman Taro); "Ultraman Leo" (ウルトラマンレオ, Urutoraman Reo) (Ultraman Leo); "The Ultraman" (Note: Guitar riff is from UFO's "Natural Thing") (ザ☆ウルトラマン, Za Urutoraman) (The Ultraman); "Ultraman 80" (ウルトラマン80, Urutoraman Eiti) (Ultraman 80); "Take Me Higher" (Ultraman Tiga); "Ultraman Dyna" (ウルトラマンダイナ, Urutoraman Daina) (Ultraman Dyna)"		10:53
2.	"Animetal Marathon IV Medley (アニメタル・マラソンIV・メドレー, Animetaru Marason Fō Medorē): "Uchū no Ōja! Godmars" (宇宙の王者！ゴッドマーズ, Uchū no Ōja! Goddomāzu; "Monarch of Space! Godmars") (Six God Combination Godmars); "Kizudarake no Eikō" (傷だらけの栄光; "Hard-Fought Honor") (Ashita no Joe 2); "Samurai Giants" (侍ジャイアンツ, Samurai Jaiantsu) (Samurai Giants); "Game Center Arashi" (ゲームセンターあらし, Gēmu Sentā Arashi) (Game Center Arashi); "Iron Leaguer: Kagirinaki Shimei" (アイアンリーガー～限りなき使命～, Aian Rīgā ~Kagirinaki Shimei~; "Iron Leaguer: Limitless Mission") (Shippū! Iron Leaguer); "Getter Robo Go" (ゲッターロボ號, Gettā Robo Gō) (Getter Robo Go); "Z no Theme" (Zのテーマ, Zetto no Tēma; "Theme of Z") (Mazinger Z)"		9:41
3.	"Animetal Lady Marathon II Medley (アニメタル・レディー・マラソンII・メドレー, Animetaru Redī Marason Tsū Medorē): "Time Bokan" (Note: Incorporates Iron Maiden's "Where Eagles Dare") (タイムボカン, Taimu Bokan) (Time Bokan); "Jim Button no Uta" (ジムボタンの歌, Jimu Botan no Uta; "Song of Jim Button") (Jim Button and Luke the Engine Driver); "Dororo no Uta" (どろろの歌; "Song of Dororo") (Dororo); "Kerokko Demetan" (けろっこデメタン) (Demetan Croaker, The Boy Frog); "Midori no Hidamari" (緑の陽だまり; "Green Hidamari") (Fables of the Green Forest); "Anpanman March" (アンパンマンのマーチ, Anpanman no Māchi) (Anpanman)"	Animetal Lady	9:41
4.	"Animetal Marathon V Medley (アニメタル・マラソンV・メドレー, Animetaru Marason Faibu Medorē): "Pegasus Fantasy" (ペガサス幻想, Pegasasu Fantajī) (Saint Seiya); "Kinnikuman Go Fight!" (キン肉マン Go Fight！, Kin'nikuman Gō Faito!) (Kinnikuman); "Moero Hero" (燃えてヒーロー, Moete Hīrō; "Burning Hero") (Captain Tsubasa); "Touch" (タッチ, Tatchi) (Touch); "Lupin Sansei no Theme" (ルパン三世のテーマ, Rupan Sansei no Tēma; "Theme of Lupin the Third") (Lupin the Third Part II); "Yatterman no Uta" (ヤッターマンの歌, Yattāman no Uta; "Song of Yatterman") (Yatterman); "Zankoku na Tenshi no Tēze" (残酷な天使のテーゼ; "A Cruel Angel's Thesis") (Neon Genesis Evangelion)"	Syu; Masaki; Katsuji; Yorimasa Hisatake	9:34
5.	"Animetal Marathon VI Medley (アニメタル・マラソンVI・メドレー, Animetaru Marason Shikkusu Medorē): "Gattai! Getter Robo" (合体！ゲッターロボ, Gattai! Gettā Robo; "Combine! Getter Robo") (Getter Robo); "Bokura no Mazinger Z" (ぼくらのマジンガーZ, Bokura no Majingā Zetto; "Our Mazinger Z") (Mazinger Z); "Seigi no Chōnōryoku Shōnen" (正義の超能力少年; "Superpowered Boys of Justice") (Babel II); "Lupin Sansei Ai no Theme" (ルパン三世 愛のテーマ, Rupan Sansei Ai no Tēma; "Lupin the Third Love Theme") (Lupin the Third Part II); "The Galaxy Express 999" (Galaxy Express 999); "Meguriai" (めぐりあい, "Encounters") (Mobile Suit Gundam III: Encounters in Space)"		10:29
6.	"Animetal Marathon VII Medley (アニメタル・マラソンVII・メドレー, Animetaru Marason Sebun Medorē): "Cat's Eye" (キャッツ・アイ, Kyattsu Ai) (Cat's Eye); "Makafushigi Adventure!" (魔訶不思議アドベンチャー！, Makafushigi Adobenchā!; "Mystical Adventure!") (Dragon Ball); "Cha-La Head Cha-La" (Dragon Ball Z); "Monkey Magic" (モンキー・マジック, Monkī Majikku) (Saiyuki); "Akai Yūhi no Barabaraman" (赤い夕陽のバラバラマン; "Barabaraman of the Red Evening Sun") (Robot Hatchan); "Midnight Dekaranger" (ミッドナイト・デカレンジャー, Middonaito Dekarenjā) (Tokusou Sentai Dekaranger)"		9:48
7.	"For the Bravehearts Only! -2011 Edited Version-: "Doraemon no Uta" (ドラえもんのうた; "Song of Doraemon") (Doraemon); "Ninja Hattori-kun" (忍者ハットリくん) (Ninja Hattori-kun); "Suimin Busoku" (すいみん不足, "Insufficient") (Kiteretsu Daihyakka); "Kite yo Perman" (きてよパーマン, Kite yo Pāman; "Come On, Perman") (Perman); "Wai Wai World" (ワイワイワールド, Wai Wai Wārudo) (Konami Wai Wai World); "Ora wa Ninki Mono" (オラはにんきもの, "I'm Popular") (Crayon Shin-chan); "Odoru Pompokolin" (おどるポンポコリン, Odoru Ponpokorin; "Dance the Pompokolin") (Chibi Maruko-chan)"		7:53
8.	"The Animetal: "Gatchaman no Uta" (ガッチャマンの歌; "Song of Gatchaman") (Science Ninja Team Gatchaman); "Combattler V Theme" (コン・バトラーVのテーマ, Conbatorā Bui no Tēma) (Chōdenji Robo Combattler V); "Yūsha Raideen" (勇者ライディーン, Yūsha Raidīn) (Reideen The Brave); "Tatakae! Casshan" (たたかえ！キャシャーン, Tatakae! Kyashān) (Casshan); "Mazinger Z" (マジンガーZ, Majingā Zetto) (Mazinger Z); "Getter Robo!" (ゲッターロボ！, Gettā Robo!) (Getter Robo); "Devilman no Uta" (デビルマンの歌, Debiruman no Uta; "Song of Devilman") (Devilman)"		6:30
Total length:			74:29

== Personnel ==
- Eizo Sakamoto (坂本 英三, Sakamoto Eizō) – Lead vocals
- She-Ja (屍忌蛇, Shiija) – Guitar (except where indicated)
- Syu – Guitar (Disc 2 tracks 2–8)
- Masaki – Bass

with

- Mie (未唯, Mī) – Lead vocals (Animetal Lady tracks)
- Katsuji – Drums (except where indicated)
- Yasuhiro Umezawa (梅澤 康博, Umezawa Yasuhiro) – Drums (Disc 1 tracks 1–4)
- Munetaka Higuchi (樋口 宗孝, Higuchi Munetaka) – Drums (Disc 1 tracks 5, 7)
- Shinki – Drums (9)
- Rei Atsumi (厚見 玲衣, Atsumi Rei) – Keyboards (Disc 1 track 6)
- Hiroyuki Namba (難波 弘之, Namba Hiroyuki) – Keyboards (Disc 1 track 10)

== Charts ==
Chart (2011)	Peak position
Japanese Albums (Oricon)	139
