= Complete Last Live =

Live album by Animetal
- Released: October 1, 1999
- Recorded: July 31, 1999
- Venues: Shibuya Club Quattro; Shibuya, Tokyo, Japan
- Genres: Heavy metal; anison
- Length: 2:33:16
- Label: SME Records
- Producer: Animetal

Animetal chronology
Complete First Live (1999)	Complete Last Live (1999)	Animetal Marathon IV (2001)

Complete Last Live (コンプリート・ラスト・ライブ, Konpurīto Rasuto Raibu) is the second of two double live albums released by Japanese novelty heavy metal band Animetal. Released by Sony Records on October 1, 1999, it was recorded at the band's concert at the Shibuya Club Quattro on July 31, 1999. This was the band's last release before undergoing a two-year hiatus.

== Track listing ==
All tracks are arranged by Animetal.

Disc 1
No.	Title	Length
1.	"Theme of Animetal II (Ryūketsu no Sanmika)" (Animetaru no Tēma Tsū (Ryūketsu no Sanmika) (アニメタルのテーマII (流血の讃美歌); "Theme of Animetal II (Bloodshed's Eulogy Beautiful Song)"))	1:59
2.	"Getter Robo!" (Gettā Robo! (ゲッターロボ！))	3:08
3.	"Tekkaman no Uta" (Tekkaman no Uta (テッカマンの歌; "Song of Tekkaman"))	3:46
4.	"MC1"	2:07
5.	"Combattler V no Theme" (Kon Batorā Bui no Tēma (コン・バトラーVのテーマ))	2:51
6.	"Tatakae! Casshan" (Tatakae! Kyashān (たたかえ！キャシャーン; "Fight! Casshan"))	2:47
7.	"MC2"	3:51
8.	"Animetal Summer Type 2 (アニメタル・サマー Type2, Animetal Samā Taipu Tsū): "Ike Ike Hyūma" (行け行け飛雄馬; "Go Go Hyuma") (Star of the Giants); "Ganbare Dokaben" (がんばれドカベン; "Win, Dokaben") (Dokaben); "Apache Yakyūgun" (アパッチ野球軍, Apatchi Yakyūgun; "Apache Baseball Army") (Apache Yakyūgun); "Ōja! Samurai Giants" (王者！侍ジャイアンツ, Ōja! Samurai Jaiantsu; "Monarch! Samurai Giants") (Samurai Giants); "Kaze ni Nare!" (風になれ！; "With the Wind!") (Ganbare Genki); "Ashita no Joe" (あしたのジョー, Ashita no Jō; "Tomorrow's Joe") (Ashita no Joe)"	7:49
9.	"Guitar Solo"	4:01
10.	"MC3"	3:08
11.	"Uchū Keiji Medley (宇宙刑事メドレー, Uchū Keiji Medorē; "Space Sheriff Medley"): "Uchū Keiji Gavan" (宇宙刑事ギャバン, Uchū Keiji Gyaban) (Space Sheriff Gavan); "Uchū Keiji Sharivan" (宇宙刑事シャリバン, Uchū Keiji Shariban) (Space Sheriff Sharivan); "Uchū Keiji Shaider" (宇宙刑事シャイダー, Uchū Keiji Shaidā) (Space Sheriff Shaider)"	5:37
12.	"MC4"	7:27
13.	"Animetal Marathon II Medley (アニメタル・マラソンIIメドレー, Animetaru Marason Tsū Medorē): "Kikaider 01" (キカイダー01, Kikaidā Zero Wan) (Kikaider 01); "Kaze yo Hikari yo" (風よ光よ; "Oh Wind, Oh Light") (Kaiketsu Lion-Maru); "Tetsujin Tiger Seven" (鉄人タイガーセブン, Tetsujin Taigā Sebun) (Tetsujin Tiger Seven); "Wild 7" (ワイルドセブン, Wairudo Sebun) (Wild 7); "Bokura no Barom-1" (ぼくらのバロム1, Bokura no Baromu Wan; "Our Barom-1") (Barom-1); Bass Solo; "Kagayaku Taiyō Kagestar" (輝く太陽カゲスター, Kagayaku Taiyō Kagesutā; "Shining Sun Kagestar") (The Kagestar); "Iron King" (アイアンキング, Aian Kingu) (Iron King); "Kagaku Sentai Dynaman" (科学戦隊ダイナマン, Kagaku Sentai Dainaman; "Scientific Squadron Dynaman") (Kagaku Sentai Dynaman)"	12:59
14.	"MC5"	1:21
15.	"Hana (Shinomori Aoshi no Theme) (a cappella)" (Hana (Shinomori Aoshi no Tēma)~ akapera (華（四乃森蒼紫のテーマ）～アカペラ; "Flower (Shinomori Aoshi's Theme) ~a Cappella"))	1:44
16.	"MC6"	0:46
17.	"Tensai! Kishiwada-hakase no Uta" ((天才！岸和田博士のうた; "Genius! Song of Dr. Kishiwada"))	4:42
18.	"MC7"	1:25
19.	"Eizo Sakamoto's Acoustic Corner 1 (坂本英三アコースティック・コーナー 1, Sakamoto Eizō Akōsutikku Kōnā Wan): "Voltes V no Uta" (ボルテスVの歌, Borutesu Faibu no Uta; "Song of Voltes V") (Chōdenji Machine Voltes V); "Diamond Eye" (ダイヤモンドアイ, Daiyamondo Ai) (Diamond Eye); "Uchū Tetsujin Kyōdain" (宇宙鉄人キョーダイン) (Space Ironman Kyodain)"	3:43
Total length:		75:20

Disc 2
No.	Title	Length
1.	"Eizo Sakamoto's Acoustic Corner 2 (坂本英三アコースティック・コーナー 2, Sakamoto Eizō Akōsutikku Kōnā Tsū): "J.A.K.Q. Dengekitai" (ジャッカー電撃隊, Jakkā Dengekitai; "J.A.K.Q. Blitzkrieg Squadron") (J.A.K.Q. Dengekitai); "Sōgen no Marco" (草原のマルコ, Sōgen no Maruko; "Marco's Grassland") (3000 Leagues in Search of Mother); "Bara wa Utsushiku Chiru" (薔薇は美しく散る; "The Roses Fall Beautifully") (The Rose of Versailles)"	5:08
2.	"MC8"	0:56
3.	"Ginga Tetsudō 999" (Ginga Tetsudō Surī Nain (銀河鉄道999; "Galaxy Express 999"))	4:00
4.	"MC9"	2:10
5.	"Sentimetal Type 2 (センチメタル Type2, Senchimetaru Taipu Tsū): "Kyō mo Doko kade Devilman" (今日もどこかでデビルマン, Kyō mo Doko kade Debiruman; "Devilman Is Somewhere Today") (Devilman); "Ike! Combattler V" (行け！コン・バトラーV, Ike! Konbatorā Bui; "Ike! Combattler V") (Chōdenji Robo Combattler V); "Lupin Sansei Sono Ichi" (ルパン三世その1, Rupan Sansei Sono Ichi; "Lupin the Third 1") (Lupin the Third Part I); "Makka na Scarf" (真赤なスカーフ, Makka na Sukāfu; "Scarlet Scarf") (Space Battleship Yamato); "Ai Senshi" (哀・戦士; "Soldiers of Sorrow") (Mobile Suit Gundam II: Soldiers of Sorrow)"	6:48
6.	"Tokusatsu de Ikō! Type 2 (特撮でいこう！ Type2, Tokusatsu de Ikō! Taipu Tsū; "Let's Go with Tokusatsu! Type 2"): "Let's Go!! Rider Kick (レッツゴー！！ライダーキック, Rettsu Gō!! Raidā Kikku) (Kamen Rider); "Tatakae! Kamen Rider V3" (戦え！仮面ライダーV3, Tatakae! Kamen Raidā Bui Surī; "Fight! Kamen Rider V3") (Kamen Rider V3); "Setup! Kamen Rider X" (セタップ！仮面ライダーX, Setappu! Kamen Raidā Ekkusu) (Kamen Rider X); "Amazon Rider Koko ni Ari" (アマゾンライダーここにあり, Amazon Raidā Koko ni Ari; "Amazon Rider Is Here") (Kamen Rider Amazon); "Kamen Rider Stronger no Uta" (仮面ライダーストロンガーのうた, Kamen Raidā Sutorongā no Uta; "Song of Kamen Rider Stronger") (Kamen Rider Stronger); "Moero! Kamen Rider" (燃えろ！仮面ライダー, Moero! Kamen Raidā; "Burn! Kamen Rider") (Kamen Rider (Skyrider))"	5:42
7.	"MC10"	2:47
8.	"Mazinger Z" (Majingā Zetto (マジンガーZ))	7:29
9.	"Kōtetsu Jeeg no Uta" (Kōtetsu Jīgu no Uta (鋼鉄ジーグのうた; "Song of Steel Jeeg"))	5:13
10.	"Himitsu Sentai Gorenger" (Himitsu Sentai Gorenjā (秘密戦隊ゴレンジャー; "Secret Sentai Gorenger"))	6:45
11.	"MC11 (Encore 1)" (MC11 (Ankōru Wan) (MC11(アンコール 1)))	3:54
12.	"Yūki no Akashi" ((勇気の証; "Proof of Courage"))	3:09
13.	"MC12"	0:21
14.	"This Is Animetal: "Uchū Senkan Yamato" (宇宙戦艦ヤマト) (Space Battleship Yamato); "Umi no Triton" (海のトリトン, Umi no Toriton) (Triton of the Sea); "Ore wa Great Mazinger" (おれはグレートマジンガー, Ore wa Gurēto Majingā; "I Am Great Mazinger") (Great Mazinger); "Tatakae! Polymar" (戦え！ポリマー, Tatakae! Porimā; "Fight! Polymar") (Hurricane Polymar); "Tiger Mask" (タイガーマスク, Taigā Masuku) (Tiger Mask); "Babel Nisei" (バビル2世, Babiru Nisei) (Babel II); "Taga Tame ni" (誰がために; For Whose Sake") (Cyborg 009)"	7:00
15.	"Devilman no Uta" (Debiruman no Uta (デビルマンのうた; "Song of Devilman"))	4:23
16.	"MC13 (Encore 2)" (MC13 (Ankōru Tsū) (MC13(アンコール2)))	6:14
17.	"Gatchaman no Uta" ((ガッチャマンの歌; "Song of Gatchaman"))	4:03
18.	"Gaya After the Show" (Shūen-go Gaya (終演後ガヤ))	1:00
19.	"Ending Theme of Animetal (Saigo no Komoriuta)" (Animetaru no Endingu Tēma (Saigo no Komoriuta) (アニメタルのエンディング・テーマ(最期の子守唄); "Ending Theme of Animetal (The Last Lullaby)"))	0:45
Total length:		77:56

== Personnel ==
- Eizo Sakamoto (坂本 英三, Sakamoto Eizō) – Lead vocals
- She-Ja (屍忌蛇, Shiija) – Guitar
- Masaki – Bass

with

- Katsuji – Drums
