= Decade of Bravehearts =

Studio album by Animetal
- Released: August 2, 2006
- Recorded: 2006
- Genres: Heavy metal; anison
- Length: 51:08 (CD); 44:46 (DVD)
- Language: Japanese
- Label: VAP
- Producer: Yorimasa Hisatake

Animetal chronology
| Animetal Marathon VII: Fight! The Metal Heroes (2005) | Decade of Bravehearts (2006) | And Then... The Legend of Animetal (2011) |

Decade of Bravehearts is the eighth and final studio album by Japanese novelty heavy metal band Animetal, released through VAP on August 2, 2006. Commemorating the band's 10th anniversary, the album features full length covers of various anime and tokusatsu songs that they have covered on their other albums, plus their covers of the themes from the 2002 Super Sentai series Ninpuu Sentai Hurricaneger and the 2003 anime series Godannar. Also included in the album is a bonus DVD.

The album peaked at No. 110 on Oricon's weekly albums chart.

== Track listing ==
All tracks are arranged by Animetal.

CD
| No. | Title | Original anime/tokusatsu series | Length |
|---|---|---|---|
| 1. | "Uchū Senkan Yamato" ((宇宙戦艦ヤマト)) | Space Battleship Yamato | 4:09 |
| 2. | "Tatakae! Kamen Rider V3" (Tatakae! Kamen Raidā Bui Surī (戦え！仮面ライダーV3; "Fight! Kamen Rider V3")) | Kamen Rider V3 | 3:22 |
| 3. | "Cha-La Head-Cha-La" | Dragon Ball Z | 3:11 |
| 4. | "Ai o Torimodose!!" ((愛をとりもどせ!!; "Take Back the Love!!")) | Fist of the North Star | 3:18 |
| 5. | "Ultraman Leo" (Urutoraman Leo (ウルトラマンレオ)) | Ultraman Leo | 2:47 |
| 6. | "Shinkon Gattai Godannar!!" (Shinkon Gattai Gōdan'nā!! (神魂合体ゴーダンナー!!; "God Soul Combination Godannar!!")) | Godannar | 4:14 |
| 7. | "Kimi wo Nosete" ((君をのせて; "Placing You")) | Laputa: Castle in the Sky | 3:21 |
| 8. | "Bara wa Utsukushiku Chiru" ((薔薇は美しく散る; "The Roses Fall Beautifully")) | The Rose of Versailles | 3:52 |
| 9. | "Ginga Tetsudō 999" (Ginga Tetsudō Surī Nain (銀河鉄道999)) | Galaxy Express 999 | 4:05 |
| 10. | "Hurricaneger Sanjō!" (Harikenjā Sanjō! (ハリケンジャー参上！; "Hurricaneger Has Arrived!")) | Ninpuu Sentai Hurricaneger | 4:13 |
| 11. | "Iron Leaguer: Kagirinaki Shimei" (Aian Rīgā ~Kagirinaki Shimei~ (アイアンリーガー～限りなき使命～; "Iron Leaguer ~Limitless Mission~")) | Shippū! Iron Leaguer | 3:22 |
| 12. | "Taga Tame ni" ((誰がために; "For Who's Sake")) | Cyborg 009 | 2:58 |
| 13. | "Touch (Note: Incorporates Metallica's "Battery")" (Tatchi (タッチ)) | Touch | 4:15 |
| 14. | "Pegasus Fantasy" (Pegasasu Fantajī (ペガサス幻想)) | Saint Seiya | 4:01 |
| Total length: | | | 51:08 |

DVD
| No. | Title | Length |
|---|---|---|
| 1. | "Cat's Eye / Makafushigi Adventure!" (Music Video) | 3:18 |
| 2. | "Magiranger / Dekaranger" (Music Video) | 3:13 |
| 3. | "Marathon V Medley" (Live) | 8:52 |
| 4. | "Marathon VI Medley" (Live) | 12:07 |
| 5. | "Marathon VII Medley" (Live) | 12:17 |
| 6. | "The Psycho Marathon" (Trailer) | 1:41 |
| 7. | "Marathon in Paris" (Trailer) | 3:18 |
| Total length: | | 44:46 |

== Personnel ==
- Eizo Sakamoto (さかもと えいぞう, Sakamoto Eizō) - Lead vocals
- Syu - Guitar
- Masaki - Bass

with

- Katsuji - Drums
- Junichi Sato (佐藤 潤一, Satō Jun'ichi) - Drums

== Charts ==
| Chart (2006) | Peak position |
|---|---|
| Japanese Albums (Oricon) | 110 |
