= Best of Animetal =

Compilation album by Animetal
- Released: May 21, 1998
- Recorded: 1996–1998
- Genres: Heavy metal; anison
- Length: 67:59
- Language: Japanese
- Label: Sony Records
- Producer: Animetal

Animetal chronology
This Is Japanimetal Marathon (1998)	Best of Animetal (1998)	Animetal Marathon III (1998)

Best of Animetal (アニメタルのベスト, Animetaru no Besuto) is a compilation album by Japanese novelty heavy metal band Animetal, released through Sony Records on May 21, 1998. The album compiles the A-sides of the various singles they had released from 1996 to 1998. With the exception of "Animetal" (which was previously released under Funhouse Records), all of the singles were released by Sony.

== Track listing ==
All tracks are arranged by Animetal.

No.	Title	Length
1.	"Animetal (アニメタル, Animetaru): "Gatchaman no Uta" (ガッチャマンの歌; "Song of Gatchaman") (Science Ninja Team Gatchaman); "Combattler V Theme" (コン・バトラーVのテーマ, Conbatorā Bui no Tēma) (Chōdenji Robo Combattler V); "Yūsha Raideen" (勇者ライディーン, Yūsha Raidīn) (Reideen The Brave); "Tatakae! Casshan" (たたかえ！キャシャーン, Tatakae! Kyashān) (Casshan); "Mazinger Z" (マジンガーZ, Majingā Zetto) (Mazinger Z); "Getter Robo!" (ゲッターロボ！, Gettā Robo!) (Getter Robo); "Devilman no Uta" (デビルマンの歌, Debiruman no Uta; "Song of Devilman") (Devilman)"	6:08
2.	"This Is Animetal: "Uchū Senkan Yamato" (宇宙戦艦ヤマト) (Space Battleship Yamato); "Umi no Triton" (海のトリトン, Umi no Toriton) (Triton of the Sea); "Ore wa Great Mazinger"" (おれはグレートマジンガー, Ore wa Gurēto Majingā; "I Am Great Mazinger") (Great Mazinger); "Tatakae! Polymar" (戦え！ポリマー, Tatakae! Porimā; "Fight! Polymar") (Hurricane Polymar); "Tiger Mask" (タイガーマスク, Taigā Masuku) (Tiger Mask); "Babel II" (バビル2世, Babiru Nisei) (Babel II); "Taga Tame ni" (誰がために; "For Whose Sake") (Cyborg 009)"	6:35
3.	"Tokusatsu de Ikō! (特撮でいこう！; "Let's Go with Tokusatsu!"): "Let's Go!! Rider Kick (レッツゴー！！ライダーキック, Rettsu Gō!! Raidā Kikku) (Kamen Rider); "Kamen Rider no Uta" (仮面ライダーのうた, Kamen Raidā no Uta; "Song of Kamen Rider") (Kamen Rider); "Tatakae! Kamen Rider V3" (戦え！仮面ライダーV3, Tatakae! Kamen Raidā Bui Surī; "Fight! Kamen Rider V3") (Kamen Rider V3); "Setup! Kamen Rider X" (セタップ！仮面ライダーX, Setappu! Kamen Raidā Ekkusu) (Kamen Rider X); "Amazon Rider Koko ni Ari" (アマゾンライダーここにあり, Amazon Raidā Koko ni Ari; "Amazon Rider Is Here") (Kamen Rider Amazon); "Kamen Rider Stronger no Uta" (仮面ライダーストロンガーのうた, Kamen Raidā Sutorongā no Uta; "Song of Kamen Rider Stronger") (Kamen Rider Stronger); "Moero! Kamen Rider" (燃えろ！仮面ライダー, Moero! Kamen Raidā; "Burn! Kamen Rider") (Kamen Rider (Skyrider))"	6:41
4.	"Animetal Lady Sanjō! (アニメタル・レディー参上！, Animetaru Redī Sanjō!; "Animetal Lady Is Here"): "Majokko Megu-chan" (魔女っ子メグちゃん; "Little Meg the Witch Girl") (Majokko Megu-chan); "Mahōtsukai Sally" (魔法使いサリー, Mahōtsukai Sarī) (Sally the Witch); "Hana no Ko Lunlun" (花の子ルンルン, Hana no Ko Runrun; "Lunlun the Flower Child") (Hana no Ko Lunlun); "Fushigi na Melmo" (ふしぎなメルモ, Fushigi na Merumo) (Fushigi na Melmo); "Magic Mako-chan" (魔法のマコちゃん, Mahō no Makochan) (Mahō no Mako-chan); Majokko Tickle" (魔女っ子チックル, Majokko Chikkuru; "Magical Girl Tickle") (Majokko Tickle); "Cutie Honey" (キューティーハニー, Kyūtī Hanī) (Cutie Honey)"	7:11
5.	"Animetal Summer (アニメタル・サマー, Animetaru Samā): "Ike Ike Hyūma" (行け行け飛雄馬; "Go Go Hyuma") (Star of the Giants); "Kimi wa Nanika ga Dekiru" (君は何かができる; "What Can I Do?") (Captain); "Ganbare Dokaben" (がんばれドカベン; "Win, Dokaben") (Dokaben); "Apache Yakyūgun" (Note: Incorporates Iron Maiden's "Aces High") (アパッチ野球軍, Apatchi Yakyūgun; "Apache Baseball Army") (Apache Yakyūgun); "Ōja! Samurai Giants" (王者！侍ジャイアンツ, Ōja! Samurai Jaiantsu; "Monarch! Samurai Giants") (Samurai Giants); "Kaze ni Nare!" (風になれ！; "With the Wind!") (Ganbare Genki); "Ashita no Joe" (あしたのジョー, Ashita no Jō; "Tomorrow's Joe") (Ashita no Joe)"	10:16
6.	"Animetal Lady Kenzan! (アニメタル・レディー見参！, Animetaru Redī Kenzan!; "Animetal Lady Has Been Found!"): "Candy Candy" (キャンディ・キャンディ, Kyandi Kyandi) (Candy Candy); "Oshiete" (Note: Guitar riff is loosely based on Led Zeppelin's "Immigrant Song") (おしえて; "Teach Me") (Heidi, Girl of the Alps); "Sōgen no Marco" (Note: Ending incorporates Whitesnake's "Fool for Your Loving") (草原のマルコ, Sōgen no Maruko; "Marco's Grassland") (3000 Leagues in Search of Mother); "Attack No. 1" (アタックNo.1, Atakku Nanbā Wan) (Attack No. 1); "Minashigo Hutch" (みなしごハッチ, Minashigo Hatchi) (The Adventures of Hutch the Honeybee); "Leo no Uta" (レオのうた, Reo no Uta; "Song of Leo") (Kimba the White Lion); "Sukisuki Song" (Note: Incorporates Queen's "We Will Rock You" and the keyboard intro of Journey's "Separate Ways (Worlds Apart)") (すきすきソング, Sukisuki Songu) (Himitsu no Akko-chan)"	9:47
7.	"Sentimetal (センチメタル, Senchimetaru): "Kyō mo Doko kade Devilman" (今日もどこかでデビルマン, Kyō mo Doko kade Debiruman; "Devilman Is Somewhere Today") (Devilman); "Ike! Combattler V" (行け！コン・バトラーV, Ike! Konbatorā Bui; "Ike! Combattler V") (Chōdenji Robo Combattler V); "Lupin Sansei Sono Ichi" (ルパン三世その1, Rupan Sansei Sono Ichi; "Lupin the Third 1") (Lupin the Third Part I); "Makka na Scarf" (真赤なスカーフ, Makka na Sukāfu; "Scarlet Scarf") (Space Battleship Yamato); "Minashiji no Ballad" (みなし児のバラード, Minashiji no Barādo; "Children's Ballad") (Tiger Mask); "Ai Senshi" (Note: Incorporates Iron Maiden's "The Number of the Beast") (哀・戦士; "Soldiers of Sorrow") (Mobile Suit Gundam II: Soldiers of Sorrow)"	7:59
8.	"Towa no Mirai (永遠の未来; "Eternal Future")"	5:07
9.	"Yūki no Akashi (勇気の証; "Proof of Courage")"	3:14
10.	"Tensai! Kishiwada-hakase no Uta (天才！岸和田博士のうた; "Genius! Song of Dr. Kishiwada")"	4:56
Total length:		67:59

== Personnel ==
- Eizo Sakamoto (坂本 英三, Sakamoto Eizō) - Lead vocals
- She-Ja (屍忌蛇, Shiija) - Guitar (except where indicated)
- Masaki - Bass (except where indicated)

with

- Mie (未唯, Mī) - Lead vocals (4, 6)
- Yasufumi Shinozuka (篠塚 泰文, Shinozuka Yasufumi) - Guitar (1)
- Yō Okamura (岡村 陽, Okamura Yō) - Bass (1)
- Take-Shit - Bass (2)
- Devil Miyamoto (デビル宮本, Debiru Miyamoto) - Drum programming (1)
- Katsuji - Drums (except where indicated)
- Yasuhiro Umezawa (梅澤 康博, Umezawa Yasuhiro) - Drums (3–4)
- Munetaka Higuchi (樋口 宗孝, Higuchi Munetaka) - Drums (5, 7)
- Shinki - Drums (9)
- Rei Atsumi (厚見 玲衣, Atsumi Rei) - Keyboards (6)
- Hiroyuki Namba (難波 弘之, Namba Hiroyuki) - Keyboards (8)
