= Dr. Saturn =

Dr. Saturn may refer to:

- Dr. Saturn, a character in the video game Battle Circuit
- Dr. Saturn, a specific Mr. Saturn in the video game EarthBound
- Dr. Saturn or Dr. Satan, a character in the tokusatsu series The Kagestar
