= Doctor Satan =

Doctor Satan may refer to:

- Dr. Satan, a villain in a series of pulp stories by Paul Ernst that ran in Weird Tales
- Dr. Satan, a character in the film House of 1000 Corpses
- Doctor Satan, a character in the film serial Mysterious Doctor Satan, also known as Doctor Satan's Robot
- Dr. Satan, archenemy of the Japanese superhero Kagestar
- Doctor Satán, a 1966 Mexican film directed by Miguel Morayta
- Marcel Petiot (1897–1946), French doctor and serial killer, active in Paris during World War II
