= Animetalive =

Video by Animetal
- Released: May 21, 1997 (VHS); November 23, 2005 (DVD)
- Recorded: March 23, 1997
- Venues: Shibuya Club Quattro; Shibuya, Tokyo, Japan
- Genres: Heavy metal; anison
- Length: 43:39
- Language: Japanese
- Label: Sony Records
- Producer: Animetal

Animetal chronology
Animetalive (1997)	The Fourth Marathon (2002)

Animetalive (アニメタライブ, Animetaraibu) is the first live concert video released by Japanese novelty heavy metal band Animetal. Released by Sony Records on May 21, 1997, it was recorded at the band's debut concert at the Shibuya Club Quattro on March 23, 1997. The full audio version of this concert was released on double-CD On October 1, 1999, as Complete First Live. Animetalive was re-released on DVD on November 23, 2005.

== Track listing ==
All tracks are arranged by Animetal.

Disc 1
No.	Title	Length
1.	"Theme of Animetal" (Animetaru no Tēma (アニメタルのテーマ))	0:49
2.	"Gatchaman no Uta" ((ガッチャマンの歌; "Song of Gatchaman"))	3:04
3.	"Umi no Triton" (Umi no Toriton (海のトリトン))	4:17
4.	"Combattler V no Theme" (Kon Batorā Bui no Tēma (コン・バトラーVのテーマ))	2:58
5.	"Yūsha Raideen" (Yūsha Raidīn (勇者ライディーン; "Reideen The Brave"))	2:57
6.	"Mahōtsukai Sally" (Mahōtsukai Sarī (魔法使いサリー))	3:49
7.	"Mazinger Z" (Majingā Zetto (マジンガーZ))	6:20
8.	"Devilman no Uta" (Debiruman no Uta (デビルマンのうた; "Song of Devilman"))	5:55
9.	"Ginga Tetsudō 999" (Ginga Tetsudō Surī Nain (銀河鉄道999; "Galaxy Express 999"))	4:16
10.	"This Is Animetal: Uchū Senkan Yamato; Umi no Triton; Ore wa Great Mazinger; Tatakae! Polymar; Tiger Mask; Cutie Honey; Babel Nisei; Taga Tame ni; "	8:00
11.	"Getter Robo! [End Credits]" (Gettā Robo! (ゲッターロボ！))	1:13
Total length:		43:39

== Personnel ==
- Eizo Sakamoto (坂本 英三, Sakamoto Eizō) – Lead vocals
- She-Ja (屍忌蛇, Shiija) – Guitar
- Masaki – Bass
- Yasuhiro Umezawa (梅澤 康博, Umezawa Yasuhiro) – Drums
- Mie (未唯, Mī) – Lead vocals (Animetal Lady)

with

- Norifumi Shima (島 紀史, Shima Norifumi) – Guitar
