= Complete First Live =

Live album by Animetal
- Released: October 1, 1999
- Recorded: March 23, 1997
- Venues: Shibuya Club Quattro; Shibuya, Tokyo, Japan
- Genres: Heavy metal; anison
- Length: 1:40:11
- Language: Japanese
- Label: SME Records
- Producer: Animetal

Animetal chronology
Animetal Marathon III (1998)	Complete First Live (1999)	Complete Last Live (1999)

Complete First Live (コンプリート・ファースト・ライブ, Konpurīto Fāsuto Raibu) is the first of two double live albums by Japanese novelty heavy metal band Animetal. Released by Sony Records on October 1, 1999, it was recorded at the band's debut concert at the Shibuya Club Quattro on March 23, 1997. An edited version of the concert was previously released direct-to-video as Animetalive (アニメタライブ, Animetaraibu) in 1997.

== Track listing ==
All tracks are arranged by Animetal.

Disc 1
No.	Title	Length
1.	"Theme of Animetal" (Animetaru no Tēma (アニメタルのテーマ))	1:09
2.	"Gatchaman no Uta" ((ガッチャマンの歌; "Song of Gatchaman"))	3:04
3.	"Umi no Triton" (Umi no Toriton (海のトリトン))	3:47
4.	"MC1"	1:45
5.	"Combattler V no Theme" (Kon Batorā Bui no Tēma (コン・バトラーVのテーマ))	2:57
6.	"Yūsha Raideen" (Yūsha Raidīn (勇者ライディーン; "Reideen The Brave"))	4:27
7.	"MC2"	2:29
8.	"Tekkaman no Uta" ((テッカマンの歌; "Song of Tekkaman"))	3:48
9.	"Drum Solo"	2:11
10.	"Bass Solo"	3:08
11.	"Guitar Solo"	5:56
12.	"Grand Prix no Taka" (Guranpuri no Taka (ランプリの鷹; "Hawk of the Grand Prix"))	3:09
13.	"Tatakae! Casshan" (Tatakae! Kyashān (たたかえ！キャシャーン; "Fight! Casshan"))	3:03
14.	"MC3"	5:26
15.	"Shippu Xabungle" (Shippū Zabungaru (疾風ザブングル; "Gale Wind Xabungle"))	4:10
Total length:		50:35

Disc 2
No.	Title	Length
1.	"Getter Robo!" (Gettā Robo! (ゲッターロボ！))	3:33
2.	"Cutie Honey" (Kyūtī Hanī (キューティーハニー))	2:56
3.	"Mahōtsukai Sally" (Mahōtsukai Sarī (魔法使いサリー))	3:50
4.	"Mazinger Z" (Majingā Zetto (マジンガーZ))	6:21
5.	"Devilman no Uta" (Debiruman no Uta (デビルマンのうた; "Song of Devilman"))	6:05
6.	"Encore Applause 1" (Ankōru Mae Hakushu Wan (アンコール前拍手1))	3:41
7.	"Ginga Tetsudō 999" (Ginga Tetsudō Surī Nain (銀河鉄道999; "Galaxy Express 999"))	4:15
8.	"MC4"	1:18
9.	"Tobe! Gundam" (Tobe! Gundamu (翔べ！ガンダム; "Fly! Gundam"))	4:00
10.	"Encore Applause 2" (Ankōru Mae Hakushu Tsū (アンコール前拍手2))	1:56
11.	"MC5"	3:02
12.	"This Is Animetal Type 2: "Uchū Senkan Yamato" (宇宙戦艦ヤマト) (Space Battleship Yamato); "Umi no Triton" (Triton of the Sea); "Ore wa Great Mazinger" (おれはグレートマジンガー, Ore wa Gurēto Majingā; "I Am Great Mazinger") (Great Mazinger); "Tatakae! Polymar" (戦え！ポリマー, Tatakae! Porimā; "Fight! Polymar") (Hurricane Polymar); "Tiger Mask" (タイガーマスク, Taigā Masuku) (Tiger Mask); "Cutie Honey" (Cutie Honey); "Babel Nisei" (バビル2世, Babiru Nisei) (Babel II); "Taga Tame ni" (誰がために; "For Whose Sake") (Cyborg 009)"	8:34
Total length:		49:36

== Personnel ==
- Eizo Sakamoto (坂本 英三, Sakamoto Eizō) – Lead vocals
- She-Ja (屍忌蛇, Shiija) – Guitar
- Masaki – Bass
- Yasuhiro Umezawa (梅澤 康博, Umezawa Yasuhiro) – Drums
- Mie (未唯, Mī) – Lead vocals (Animetal Lady)

with

- Norifumi Shima (島 紀史, Shima Norifumi) – Guitar
