= Animetal Marathon IV =

Studio album by Animetal
- Released: September 12, 2001
- Recorded: 2001
- Studios: Studio Fine; U'sus Waseda Studio; MIT Studio
- Genres: Heavy metal; anison
- Length: 47:59
- Language: Japanese
- Label: Cutting Edge Records
- Producer: Yorimasa Hisatake

Animetal chronology
Complete First Live; Complete Last Live (1999)	Animetal Marathon IV (2001)	Animetal Lady Marathon II (2002)

Animetal Marathon IV (アニメタル・マラソンIV, Animetaru Marason Fō) is the fourth full album by Japanese novelty heavy metal band Animetal, released through Cutting Edge Records on September 12, 2001. The album consists of a non-stop marathon of metal covers of anime themes from the 1970s, 1980s, and 1990s. It also marked the return of Animetal after a two-year hiatus. However, it was also the last to feature lead guitarist She-Ja, who was then replaced by Syu on the band's subsequent releases.

== Track listing ==
All tracks are arranged by Animetal.

No.	Title	Original anime	Length
1.	"Jigoku no Sanjūshi -Instrumental-" ((地獄の三銃士 -Instrumental-; "Hell's Three Musketeers -Instrumental-"))		1:53
2.	"Uchū no Ōja! Godmars" (Uchū no Ōja! Goddomāzu (宇宙の王者！ゴッドマーズ; "Monarch of Space! Godmars"))	Six God Combination Godmars	1:37
3.	"L-Gaim - Time for L-Gaim" (Erugaimu -Time for L-GAIM- (エルガイム -Time for L-GAIM-))	Heavy Metal L-Gaim	1:14
4.	"Ushinawareta Yume wo Momete" ((失われた伝説(ゆめ)を求めて; "In Search of Lost Legends"))	Genesis Climber MOSPEADA	1:31
5.	"GōShōgun Hasshin Seyo" ((ゴーショーグン発進せよ; "GoShogun Takes Off"))	Sengoku Majin GōShōgun	0:59
6.	"Trider G7 no Theme" (Toraidā Jī Sebun no Tēma (トライダーG7のテーマ; "Theme of Trider G7"))	Invincible Robo Trider G7	1:19
7.	"Ginga Senpū Braiger" (Ginga Senpū Buraigā (銀河旋風ブライガー))	Galaxy Cyclone Braiger	1:14
8.	"Ginga Reppū Baxingar" (Ginga Reppū Bakushingā (銀河烈風バクシンガー))	Galactic Gale Baxingar	1:18
9.	"Ginga Shippū Sasuraiger (Note: Incorporates a portion of Iron Maiden's "Rime of the Ancient Mariner")" (Ginga Shippū Sasuraigā (銀河疾風サスライガー))	Galactic Whirlwind Sasuraiger	1:00
10.	"Taiyō no Shisha Tetsujin 28-go" (Taiyō no Shisha Tetsujin Nijūhachi-gō (太陽の使者 鉄人28号; "Servant of the Sun Tetsujin 28"))	Taiyō no Shisha Tetsujin 28-go	1:07
11.	"Warera ga Gatchaman" ((われらがガッチャマン; "Our Gatchaman"))	Gatchaman II	1:06
12.	"Gatchaman Fighter (Note: Incorporates Ozzy Osbourne's "I Don't Know")" (Gatchaman Faitā (ガッチャマン ファイター))	Gatchaman Fighter	1:18
13.	"Oretachi no Funade" ((おれたちの船出; "Our Departure"))	Arcadia of My Youth	1:15
14.	"Tiger Mask Nisei" (Taigā Masuku Nisei (タイガーマスク二世))	Tiger Mask II	0:42
15.	"Kizudarake no Eikō" ((傷だらけの栄光; "Hard-Fought Honor"))	Ashita no Joe 2	1:30
16.	"Samurai Giants" (Samurai Jaiantsu (侍ジャイアンツ))	Samurai Giants	0:52
17.	"Karate Baka Ichidai" ((空手バカ一代; "A Karate-Crazy Life"))	Karate Baka Ichidai	0:53
18.	"Kōya no Shōnen Isamu" (#(荒野の少年イサム; "Boy of the Wilderness Isamu"))	Kōya no Shōnen Isamu	1:13
19.	"Ai o Torimodose!!" ((愛をとりもどせ！！; "Take Back the Love!!"))	Fist of the North Star	1:56
20.	"Game Center Arashi" (Gēmu Sentā Arashi (ゲームセンターあらし))	Game Center Arashi	1:00
21.	"Yume Sōsa P.M.P.1 (Note: Incorporates Judas Priest's "Freewheel Burning")" (Yume Sōsa P.M.P. Wan (夢操作P.M.P.1; "Dream Control P.M.P.1"))	Plawres Sanshiro	1:14
22.	"Yume no Karyūdo (Note: Incorporates Yngwie Malmsteen's "Crash and Burn")" ((夢の狩人; "Dream Hunter"))	Makyō Densetsu Acrobunch	1:35
23.	"Hello, Vifam"	Ginga Hyōryū Vifam	1:19
24.	"Ōgon Senshi Gold Lightan (Note: Incorporates Pretty Maids' "Back to Back")" (Ōgon Senshi Gōrudo Raitan (黄金戦士ゴールド・ライタン))	Golden Warrior Gold Lightan	1:27
25.	"Akū Dasakusen no Theme" (Akū Dasakusen no Tēma (亜空大作戦のテーマ; "Theme of Mission Outerspace"))	Akū Daisakusen Srungle	1:09
26.	"Daltanious no Uta (Note: Incorporates UFO's "Doctor Doctor")" (Darutaniasu no Uta (ダルタニアスの歌; "Song of Daltanious"))	Mirai Robo Daltanious	1:14
27.	"Ganbare! Uchū no Senshi (Note: Incorporates Iron Maiden's "Invaders")" ((がんばれ！宇宙の戦士; "Win! Space Fighters"))	Space Emperor God Sigma	1:22
28.	"Tatakae! GoLion (Note: Incorporates Michael Schenker Group's "Captain Nemo")" (Tatakae! Goraion (斗え！ゴライオン; "Fight! GoLion"))	Hyaku Jūō GoLion	1:32
29.	"Ginga no Seishun" ((銀河の青春; "Youth of the Galaxy"))	Kikō Kantai Dairugger XV	1:18
30.	"Kōsoku Denjin Albegas" (Kōsoku Denjin Arubegasu (光速電神アルベガス; "Lightspeed Electroid Albegas"))	Kōsoku Denjin Albegas	1:17
31.	"Tatakae! Gakeen (Note: Incorporates Judas Priest's "Electric Eye")" (Tatakae! Gakīn (たたかえ！ガ・キーン; "Fight! Gakeen"))	Magne Robo Gakeen	1:26
32.	"UFO Senshi Dai Apolon" (Yūfō Senshi Daiaporon (UFO戦士ダイアポロン; "UFO Warrior Dai Apolon"))	UFO Senshi Dai Apolon	0:56
33.	"Blocker Gundan Machine Blaster" (Burokkā Gundan Mashinburastā (ブロッカー軍団 マシンブラスター; "Blocker Army Machine Blaster"))	Blocker Gundan 4 Machine Blaster	0:53
34.	"Astroganger" (Asutorogangā (アストロガンガー))	Astroganger	1:01
35.	"Iron Leaguer: Kagirinaki Shimei" (Aian Rīgā ~Kagirinaki Shimei~ (アイアンリーガー～限りなき使命～; "Iron Leaguer: Limitless Mission"))	Shippū! Iron Leaguer	1:19
36.	"Getter Robo Go" (Gettā Robo Gō (ゲッターロボ號))	Getter Robo Go	1:19
37.	"Z no Theme" (Zetto no Tēma (Zのテーマ; "Theme of Z"))	Mazinger Z	2:23
Total length:			47:59

== Personnel ==
- Eizo Sakamoto (さかもと えいぞう, Sakamoto Eizō) - Lead vocals
- She-Ja (屍忌蛇, Shiija) - Guitar
- Masaki - Bass

with

- Katsuji - Drums
- Mitsuo Takeuchi (竹内 光雄, Takeuchi Mitsuo) - Vocals (8)
- NOV - Vocals (19)
- Mie (未唯, Mī) - Female vocals (31)
