= Animetal the Second (album) =

Studio album by Animetal the Second
- Released: March 25, 2015
- Recorded: 2014
- Genres: Power metal; heavy metal; anison
- Length: 68:08
- Language: Japanese
- Label: Gr8! Records
- Producer: Dark Knight

Animetal the Second chronology
| Animetal the Second (2015) | Blizzard of Animetal the Second (2016) |

Animetal the Second (アニメタル・ザ・セカンド, Animetaru za Sekando) is the first full-length album by Animetal the Second, a solo project by anonymous female singer Queen.M. Released through Gr8! Records on March 25, 2015, it is a spiritual continuation of Eizo Sakamoto's cover band Animetal. The album consists of heavy metal covers of popular anime theme songs from the 1990s and 2000s. It also features guest performances by Dokken guitarist George Lynch, Pretty Maids guitarist Ken Hammer, Ratt guitarist Warren DeMartini, Granrodeo guitarist E-Zuka and Loudness members Akira Takasaki and Masayoshi Yamashita.

The album peaked at No. 137 on Oricon's weekly albums chart.

== Track listing ==
All tracks are arranged by Metal Yoity, except tracks 6 and 9 by F.A.B.

| No. | Title | Original anime | Length |
|---|---|---|---|
| 1. | "Overture -Theme of Animetal the Second-" | | 2:27 |
| 2. | "Lion" (Raion (ライオン)) | Macross Frontier | 5:33 |
| 3. | "Sōsei no Aquarion" (Sōsei no Akuarion (創聖のアクエリオン)) | Genesis of Aquarion | 5:05 |
| 4. | "Zankoku na Tenshi no Tēze" ((残酷な天使のテーゼ; "A Cruel Angel's Thesis")) | Neon Genesis Evangelion | 4:19 |
| 5. | "God Knows..." | The Melancholy of Haruhi Suzumiya | 5:11 |
| 6. | "Hikōkigumo" ((ひこうき雲; "Contrail")) | The Wind Rises | 4:33 |
| 7. | "Connect" (Konekuto (コネクト)) | Puella Magi Madoka Magica | 4:27 |
| 8. | "Yuzurenai Negai" ((ゆずれない願い; "Unyielding Wish")) | Magic Knight Rayearth | 4:10 |
| 9. | "Geki! Teikoku Kagekidan" ((檄！帝国華撃団; "Attack! Imperial Floral Assault Team")) | Sakura Wars | 3:01 |
| 10. | "Cutie Honey" (Kyūtī Hanī (キューティーハニー)) | Cutie Honey | 3:19 |
| 11. | "Kimi no Shiranai Monogatari" ((君の知らない物語; "A Story That You Do Not Know")) | Bakemonogatari | 5:15 |
| 12. | "Makai ga Kitarite Bu wo Kisō: Makai Taisen (Bonus Track)" ((魔界が来たりて武を競う~魔界大戦; "Demon Comes and Competes for Martial Arts ~ Demon Wars")) | | 5:48 |
| 13. | "Lion" (Instrumental) | Macross Frontier | 5:33 |
| 14. | "Sōsei no Aquarion" (Instrumental) | Genesis of Aquarion | 5:04 |
| 15. | "Zankoku na Tenshi no Tēze" (Instrumental) | Neon Genesis Evangelion | 4:22 |
| Total length: | | | 68:08 |

== Personnel ==
- Queen.M – Lead vocals
- Z.Z.T. – All instruments (except where indicated)

with

- George Lynch – Guitar (2, 13)
- Akira Takasaki – Guitar (3, 14)
- E-Zuka – Guitar (4, 15)
- Toru Meki – Guitar (5)
- Ken Hammer – Guitar (6, 10)
- Metal Pool – Guitar (6, 9)
- Warren DeMartini – Guitar (7)
- Matsu – Guitar (11)
- Dual Guy – Guitar (12)
- Masayoshi Yamashita – Bass (3, 12, 14)
- Tak Arama – Bass (5, 11)
- Metal Yoity – Bass (6, 9), guitar (9)
- F.A.B. – all instruments (6, 9)

== Charts ==
| Chart (2015) | Peak position |
|---|---|
| Japanese Albums (Oricon) | 137 |
