= Animetal Marathon VII =

Animetal Marathon VII: Fight! The Metal Heroes

Studio album by Animetal
- Released: October 21, 2005
- Recorded: 2005
- Genres: Heavy metal; anison
- Length: 63:47
- Language: Japanese
- Label: VAP
- Producer: Yorimasa Hisatake

Animetal chronology
Animetal Marathon VI: The Sentimetal (2004)	Animetal Marathon VII: Fight! The Metal Heroes (2005)	Decade of Bravehearts (2006)

Animetal Marathon VII: Fight! The Metal Heroes (アニメタル・マラソンVII ～戦え!メタル・ヒーロー～, Animetaru Marason Sebun ~Tatakae! Metaru Hīrō~) is the seventh full-length album by Japanese novelty heavy metal band Animetal, released through VAP on October 21, 2005. The album consists of a non-stop marathon of metal covers of various tokusatsu themes: the first three songs are from the newest Super Sentai series at the time of the album's recording, tracks 5-34 are tokusatsu ending themes, and tracks 35-41 are opening themes of solo tokusatsu and Metal Hero Series titles. The last track, "Jump in the Fire!", is a marathon of anime songs adapted from manga published in Weekly Shōnen Jump. Animetal Marathon VII was also the band's final marathon album.

The album peaked at No. 122 on Oricon's weekly albums chart.

== Track listing ==
All tracks are arranged by Animetal.

No.	Title	Original anime	Length
1.	"Dark Side of the Angel: Kurayami no Tenshi" ((DARK SIDE OF THE ANGEL ～暗黒の天使～))		2:05
2.	"Mahō Sentai Magiranger" (Mahō Sentai Majirenjā (魔法戦隊マジレンジャー; "Magical Squadron Magiranger"))	Mahō Sentai Magiranger	1:54
3.	"Tokusou Sentai Dekaranger" (Tokusō Sentai Dekarenjā (特捜戦隊デカレンジャー; "Special Investigation Squadron Dekaranger"))	Tokusou Sentai Dekaranger	1:35
4.	""Midnight Dekaranger"" (Middonaito Dekarenjā (ミッドナイト・デカレンジャー))	Tokusou Sentai Dekaranger	1:13
5.	"Denjiman ni Makasero!" ("Trust in Denjiman!" (デンジマンにまかせろ！))	Denshi Sentai Denjiman	1:16
6.	"Yūsha ga Yuku" ("Hero Line" (勇者が行))	Battle Fever J	1:08
7.	"Itsuka, Hana wa Saku Darō" ((いつか、花は咲くだろう; "Once Upon a Time, the Flower Will Bloom"))	J.A.K.Q. Dengekitai	0:39
8.	"Kamen Rider no Uta" (Kamen Raidā no Uta (仮面ライダーのうた; "Song of Kamen Rider"))	Kamen Rider	0:39
9.	"Shōnen Kamen Rider-tai no Uta" (Shōnen Kamen Raidā-tai no Uta (少年仮面ライダー隊の歌; "Song of Boys Kamen Rider Squad"))	Kamen Rider V3	0:47
10.	"Ore wa X-Kaizorg" (Ore wa Ekkusu Kaizōgu (おれはＸカイゾーグ; "I Am the X-Kaizorg"))	Kamen Rider X	0:59
11.	"Amazon Da Da Da!!" ((アマゾンダダダ!!))	Kamen Rider Amazon	0:58
12.	"Kyō mo Tatakau Stronger" (Kyō mo Tatakau Sutorongā (きょうもたたかうストロンガー; "Stronger Will Fight Again Today"))	Kamen Rider Stronger	0:48
13.	"Otoko no Na wa Kamen Rider" (Otoko no Na wa Kamen Raidā (男の名は仮面ライダー; "His Name Is Kamen Rider"))	Kamen Rider (Skyrider)	1:01
14.	"Haruka naru Ai ni Kakete (Note: Incorporates Killswitch Engage's "The End of Heartache")" ((はるかなる愛にかけて; "Run to a Faraway Love"))	Kamen Rider (Skyrider)	1:22
15.	"Hi o Fuke Rider Ken" (Hi o Fuke Raidā Ken (火を噴けライダー拳; "The Fiery Rider Fist"))	Kamen Rider Super-1	0:56
16.	"Tatakae!! Jinzō Ningen Kikaider" (Tatakae!! Jinzō Ningen Kikaidā (戦え!!人造人間キカイダー; "Fight!! Android Kikaider"))	Android Kikaider	0:48
17.	"Hakaider no Uta" (Hakaidā no Uta (ハカイダーの歌; "Song of Hakaider"))	Android Kikaider	1:15
18.	"01 Rock" (Zero Wan Rokku (０１ロック))	Kikaider 01	0:45
19.	"Chest! Chest! Inazuman" (Chesuto! Chesuto! Inazuman (チェスト！チェスト！イナズマン))	Inazuman	0:56
20.	"Inazuman Action" (Inazuman Akushon (イナズマン・アクション))	Inazuman Flash	0:57
21.	"Susume Robot Keiji" (Susume Robotto Keiji (進めロボット刑事; "Advance Robot Detective"))	Robot Detective	1:20
22.	"Kyōdain to Oretachi da" ("Kyodai, That's Us" (キョーダインとは俺たちだ))	Space Ironman Kyodain	0:40
23.	"Star! Star! Kagestar" (Sutā! Sutā! Kagesutā (スター！スター！カゲスター))	The Kagestar	0:55
24.	"Ōzora no Captor" (Ōzora no Kyaputā (大空のキャプター; "Captor of the Skies"))	Ninja Captor	1:24
25.	"Otoko wa Hitori Michi o Yuku" ((男はひとり道をゆく; "A Road a Man Must Travel Alone"))	Kaiketsu Zubat	1:39
26.	"Monkey Magic" (Monkī Majikku (モンキー・マジック))	Saiyuki	1:10
27.	"Gandhara" (Gandāra (ガンダーラ))	Saiyuki	1:35
28.	"Nekketsu Sarutobi Sasuke" ((熱血猿飛佐助; Hotblooded Sarutobi Sasuke))	Nekketsu Sarutobi Sasuke	1:00
29.	"Uchū Enjin Gori na no da" ((宇宙猿人ゴリなのだ; "It's Space Ape-Man Gori"))	Uchū Enjin Gori	1:40
30.	"Yūjō no Barom Cross" (Yūjō no Baromu Kurosu (友情のバロム・クロス; "Barom Cross of Friendship"))	Barom-1	0:58
31.	"Ore no Kyōdai Denjin Zaborger" (Ore no Kyōdai Denjin Zabōgā (俺の兄弟電人ザボーガー; "My Brother Denjin Zaborger"))	Denjin Zaborger	1:00
32.	"Yamato Takeshi no Uta" ((ヤマトタケシの歌; "Song of Takeshi Yamato"))	Warrior of Love Rainbowman	1:09
33.	"Akai Yūhi no Barabaraman" ((赤い夕陽のバラバラマン; "Barabaraman of the Red Evening Sun"))	Robot Hatchan	1:10
34.	"Ganbare Robocon" ((がんばれロボコン; "Do Your Best, Robocon"))	Ganbare!! Robocon	1:02
35.	"Zebraman no Uta" (Zeburāman no Uta (ゼブラーマンの歌; "Song of Zebraman"))	Zebraman	1:11
36.	"Kakero! Spider-Man" (Kakero! Supaidāman (駆けろ！スパイダーマン; "Run! Spider-Man"))	Spider-Man	1:28
37.	"Seiun Kamen Machineman" (Seiun Kamen Mashinman (星雲仮面マシンマン))	Nebula Mask Machineman	1:20
38.	"Tsuyosa wa Ai da" ((強さは愛だ; "Strength Is Love"))	Space Sheriff Sharivan	1:12
39.	"Ore ga Seigi da! Juspion" (Ore ga Seigi da! Jasupion (おれが正義だ！ジャスピオン; "I Am Justice! Juspion"))	MegaBeast Investigator Juspion	1:12
40.	"Jikuu Senshi Spielban" (Jikū Senshi Supiruban (時空戦士スピルバン; "Time-Space Warrior Spielban"))	Jikuu Senshi Spielban	1:09
41.	"Kimi no Seishun wa Kagayaite Iru ka" ((君の青春は輝いているか; "Does Your Youth Shine?"))	Choujinki Metalder	2:29
42.	"See the Distant Horizon: Bōkyaku no Suiheisen" ((SEE THE DISTANT HORIZON ～忘却の水平線～; "See the Distant Horizon ~Oblivion Horizon~"))		3:30
43.	"Jump in the Fire! (Jump Medley) (JUMP IN THE FIRE! （ジャンプ・メドレー）, Janpu in za Faiyā! (Janpu Medorē)): "Cat's Eye" (キャッツ・アイ, Kyattsu Ai) (Cat's Eye); "Makafushigi Adventure!" (魔訶不思議アドベンチャー！, Makafushigi Adobenchā!; "Mystical Adventure!") (Dragon Ball); "Cha-La Head-Cha-La" (Dragon Ball Z); "Cobra" (Space Adventure Cobra); "Homework ga Owaranai" (ホームワークが終わらない, Hōmuwāku ga Owaranai; "The Homework Doesn't End") (YuYu Hakusho); "Fuyu no Lion" (冬のライオン, Fuyu no Raion; "Winter Lion") (Captain Tsubasa); "Yogoretsu Chimatta Kanashimi ni..." (汚れつちまった悲しみに…, "The Dirty Sorrow Is Gone…") (Sakigake!! Otokojuku)"		11:33
Total length:			63:47

== Personnel ==
- Eizo Sakamoto (さかもと えいぞう, Sakamoto Eizō) - Lead vocals
- Syu - Guitar
- Masaki - Bass

with

- Katsuji - Drums

== Charts ==
Chart (2005)	Peak position
Japanese Albums (Oricon)	122
