= Ai o Torimodose!! =

Single by Crystal King
- A-side: "Ai o Torimodose!!"
- B-side: "Yuria... Towa ni"
- Released: October 1984
- Genre: Hard rock
- Label: Pony Canyon

"Ai o Torimodose!!" (Japanese: 愛をとりもどせ!!; lit. 'Take Back the Love!!') is the first opening theme song of the 1980s anime Fist of the North Star, performed by Japanese rock band Crystal King, with the verses sung by Monsieur Yoshisaki and the chorus by Masayuki Tanaka.

The song is known for the refrain "You wa Shock" (YOU は SHOCK, Yū wa Shokku; lit. 'You are shock'), which is sometimes used as an alternate title for the song. The B-side for the single is the first ending theme of Fist of the North Star, "Yuria... Towa ni" (ユリア...永遠に; lit. 'Yuria... Eternally').

== Covers and Usage in Media ==
"Ai o Torimodose!!" is featured as an extra "special BGM" in the PlayStation 2 version of the multiplatform Jissen PachiSlot Hisshohou! Hokuto no Ken video game and is also used as the opening for the 2005 Sega-Sammy arcade game.

Mixed martial artist and professional wrestler Josh Barnett used the song as an entrance theme in PRIDE Fighting Championships. He still uses this theme when making appearances or even in matches he does in Japan.

The song has been covered by multiple artists, including Animetal on Animetal Marathon IV and Decade of Bravehearts. Hiromi Konno as Akira Kogami and Minoru Shiraishi as himself covered "Ai o Torimodose!!" under the name Uchoten for the theme song of the Lucky Star OVA.

In addition, both Yoshisaki (performing as Crystal King) and Tanaka have released self covers of "Ai o Torimodose!!". This began with Yoshisaki in 2004 on a single with the theme of Lupin III as the B-side and another single later in 2004 of remixes of "Ai o Torimodose!!" with "Yuria... Towa ni" as the B-side. He later released another version of the single in 2006 titled "Ai o Torimodose!! (Movie Ver.)" (with a version of "Yuria... Towa ni" as the B-side) for the Legend of Raoh film. Tanaka's release of "Ai o Torimodose!! Special-Edition" later in 2006 included "Yuria... Towa ni" as a B-side as well as the opening theme of Fist of the North Star 2 "Tough Boy" performed by Tom.

A heavy metal arrangement of the song is featured on the Fist of the North Star: Ken's Rage soundtrack.

A cover for the song performed by The Alfee is featured as the first track on the Hokuto no Ken 35th Anniversary Album and served as the main theme for Fist of the North Star Legends Revive.

Toshi covered "Ai o Torimodose!!" for use as the ending theme of the 2026 anime adaptation of Fist of the North Star.
