= Animetal Lady Marathon =

Studio album by Animetal Lady
- Released: February 21, 1998; March 21, 1998 (karaoke)
- Recorded: 1997
- Studio: MIT Studio
- Genres: Heavy metal; anison
- Length: 42:17
- Language: Japanese
- Label: Sony Records
- Producer: Animetal

Animetal Lady chronology
Animetal Marathon II (1998)	Animetal Lady Marathon (1998)	This Is Japanimetal Marathon (1998)

Animetal Lady Marathon (アニメタル・レディー・マラソン, Animetaru Redī Marason) is the first album by Animetal unit Animetal Lady, featuring Mie of Pink Lady as the vocalist in place of Eizo Sakamoto. Released through Sony Records on February 21, 1998, the album consists of a non-stop marathon of metal covers of shōjo anime theme songs, children's anime theme songs, and other anime theme songs sung by women. A karaoke version of the album was also released on March 21, 1998.

As with the first three Animetal albums, the cover of this album features a skeleton-like figure, which is a parody of heavy metal mascots such as Eddie of Iron Maiden and Vic Rattlehead of Megadeth. Also, certain songs incorporate instrumental arrangements of well-known rock and metal songs. For example: "Haikara-san ga Tōru" uses a bass line similar to Iron Maiden's "Wrathchild".

Songs originally recorded on the singles "Animetal Lady Sanjō!" (アニメタル・レディー参上！, Animetaru Redī Sanjō!) and "Animetal Lady Kenzan!" (アニメタル・レディー見参！, Animetaru Redī Kenzan!) are featured in this album. "Moonlight Densetsu" is included in Animetal's 1998 international release This Is Japanimetal Marathon.

== Track listing ==
All tracks are arranged by Animetal.

No.	Title	Original anime	Length
1.	"Theme of Animetal Lady" (Animetaru Redī no Tēma (アニメタル・レディーのテーマ))		2:03
2.	"Cutie Honey" (Kyūtī Hanī (キューティーハニー))	Cutie Honey	0:48
3.	"Bara wa Utsushiku Chiru (Note: Song ending incorporates bridge from Gargoyle's "Shinpan no Hitomi")" ((薔薇は美しく散る; "The Roses Fall Beautifully"))	The Rose of Versailles	1:21
4.	"Ribon no Kishi" ((リボンの騎士; "Ribbon Knight"))	Princess Knight	1:03
5.	"Haikara-san ga Tōru (Note: Incorporates Iron Maiden's "Wrathchild")" ((はいからさんが通る; "Here Comes Miss Modern"))	Haikara-San: Here Comes Miss Modern	1:15
6.	"Ace o Nerae!" (Ēsu o Nerae! (エースをねらえ！))	Aim for the Ace!	1:20
7.	"Attack No. 1 no Theme (Note: Song ending incorporates main riff from Accept's "Princess of the Dawn")" (Atakku Nanbā Wan no Tēma (アタックNo.1のテーマ; "Theme of Attack No. 1"))	Attack No. 1	1:35
8.	"Mitsubachi Māya no Theme (Note: Incorporates Aerosmith's "Walk This Way")" (Mitsubachi Māya no Tēma (みつばちマーヤのテーマ; "Theme of Maya the Honey Bee"))	Maya the Honey Bee	1:02
9.	"Nee! Moomin" (Nee! Mūmin (ねぇ！ムーミン; "Hey! Moomin"))	Moomin	0:49
10.	"Sukina no Priscilla (Note: Incorporates Yngwie Malmsteen's "As Above, So Below")" (Sukina no Purishira (好きなのプリシラ; "Priscilla the Favorite"))	Calimero	1:06
11.	"Ore wa Kaibutsu-kun (Note: Guitar riff is loosely derived from Judas Priest's "Some Heads Are Gonna Roll"; song ending incorporates Rainbow's "I Surrender")" ((おれは怪物くんだ; "I Am Kaibutsu-kun"))	The Monster Kid	1:20
12.	"Oshiete (Note: Guitar riff is loosely derived from Led Zeppelin's "Immigrant Song")" ((おしえて; "Teach Me"))	Heidi, Girl of the Alps	1:02
13.	"Sōgen no Marco (Note: Song ending incorporates Whitesnake's "Fool for Your Loving")" (Sōgen no Maruko (草原のマルコ; "Marco's Grassland"))	3000 Leagues in Search of Mother	1:43
14.	"Mister Andersen (Note: Incorporates Brownsville Station/Mötley Crüe's "Smokin' In the Boys Room")" (Misutā Anderusen (ミスター・アンデルセン))	Andersen Monogatari	1:14
15.	"Hoshi no Ko Chobin" ((星の子チョビン; "Chobin the Star Child"))	Hoshi no Ko Chobin	0:56
16.	"Akubi Musume" (#"Akubi Musume" (アクビ娘; "Sister Akubi"))	The Genie Family	1:03
17.	"Hahaue-sama" ((ははうえさま))	Ikkyū-san	1:05
18.	"Hana no Ko Lunlun" (Hana no Ko Runrun (花の子ルンルン; "Lunlun the Flower Child"))	Hana no Ko Lunlun	0:59
19.	"Fushigi na Melmo" (Fushigi na Merumo (ふしぎなメルモ))	Marvelous Melmo	1:06
20.	"Mahō no Mako-chan (Note: Incorporates the keyboard intro of Asia's "Only Time Will Tell")" ((魔法のマコちゃん; "Magical Mako-chan"))	Mahō no Mako-chan	1:00
21.	"Majokko Tickle" (Majokko Chikkuru (魔女っ子チックル; "Magical Girl Tickle"))	Majokko Tickle	0:59
22.	"Himitsu no Akko-chan (Note: Incoprorates X Japan's "Love Replica")" ((ひみつのアッコちゃん; "The Secrets of Akko-chan"))	Himitsu no Akko-chan	0:54
23.	"Love Love Minky Momo" (Rabu Rabu Minkī Momo (ラブ・ラブ・ミンキーモモ))	Magical Princess Minky Momo	1:12
24.	"Lum's Love Song" (Ramu no Rabu Songu (ラムのラブソング))	Urusei Yatsura	1:27
25.	"Moonlight Densetsu (Note: Song ending incorporates main riff from Metallica's "Battery")" (Mūnraito Densetsu (ムーンライト伝説; "Moonlight Legend"))	Sailor Moon	1:09
26.	"Candy Candy" (Kyandi Kyandi (キャンディ♥キャンディ))	Candy Candy	1:16
27.	"Majokko Megu-chan" ((魔女っ子メグちゃん; "Little Meg the Witch Girl"))	Majokko Megu-chan	0:55
28.	"Mahōtsukai Sally (Note: Shortened version of the song covered in "Animetal Lady Kenzan!", with the second chorus replaced with a guitar rendition of Mozart's Marcia alla turca from Piano Sonata No.11)" (Mahōtsukai Sarī (魔法使いサリー))	Sally the Witch	1:03
29.	"Kabatot no Samba" (Kabatotto no Sanba (カバトットのサンバ; "Kaba and Totto's Samba"))	Hyppo and Thomas	0:53
30.	"Hajime Ningen Giatrus (Note: Incorporates Guns N' Roses' "Welcome to the Jungle" and the guitar solo from Deep Purple's "Smoke on the Water")" (Hajime Ningen Gyātoruzu (はじめ人間ギャートルズ))	First Human Giatrus	1:23
31.	"Obake no Q-Tarō" (Obake no Kyūtarō (オバケのQ太郎; "Little Ghost Q-Tarō"))	Obake no Q-Tarō	0:49
32.	"Sazae-san" ((サザエさん))	Sazae-san	1:06
33.	"Sukisuki Song (Note: Incorporates Queen's "We Will Rock You", the keyboard intro of Journey's "Separate Ways (Worlds Apart)" and a bass riff from Iron Maiden's "Phantom of the Opera")" (Sukisuki Songu (すきすきソング))	Himitsu no Akko-chan	1:15
34.	"Minashigo Hutch" (Minashigo Hatchi (みなしごハッチ))	The Adventures of Hutch the Honeybee	0:50
35.	"Leo no Uta" ("Leo no Uta" (レオのうた, Reo no Uta; "Song of Leo"))	Kimba the White Lion	1:43
36.	"Ending Theme of Animetal Lady (Sister Moon)" (Animetaru Redī Endingu Tēma (Sister Moon) (アニメタル・レディーのエンディング・テーマ(Sister Moon)))		1:16
Total length:			42:17

== Personnel ==
- Mie (未唯, Mī) – lead vocals
- She-Ja (屍忌蛇, Shiija) – guitar
- Masaki – bass

with

- Shinki – drums (all tracks except below)
- Katsuji – drums (7, 12–13, 26, 33–35)
- Yasuhiro Umezawa (梅澤 康博, Umezawa Yasuhiro) – drums (2, 18–21, 27–28)
- Rei Atsumi (厚見 玲衣, Atsumi Rei) – keyboards
- Kenji Shimizu (清水 賢治, Shimizu Kenji) – keyboards
