= Animetal Marathon VI =

Animetal Marathon VI: The Sentimetal

Studio album by Animetal
- Released: September 22, 2004
- Recorded: 2004
- Genres: Heavy metal; anison
- Length: 57:59
- Language: Japanese
- Label: VAP
- Producer: Yorimasa Hisatake

Animetal chronology
The Animetal: Re-Birth Heroes (2003)	Animetal Marathon VI: The Sentimetal (2004)	Animetal Marathon VII: Fight! The Metal Heroes (2006)

Animetal Marathon VI: The Sentimetal (アニメタル・マラソンVI～THE SENTIMETAL～, Animetaru Marason Shikkusu ~Za Senchimetaru~) is the sixth full-length album by Japanese novelty heavy metal band Animetal, released through VAP on September 22, 2004. The album consists of a non-stop marathon of metal covers of anime ending themes; mainly from the Super Robot series. Some songs were previously recorded as the band's 1997 single Sentimetal.

The album cover by Ken Ishikawa depicts the band trio as Getter Robo-like robots.

== Track listing ==
All tracks are arranged by Animetal.

No.	Title	Original anime	Length
1.	"Tenshō: Absolute in Chaos" ((「天翔」～ Absolute In Chaos))		2:19
2.	"Gattai! Getter Robo" (Gattai! Gettā Robo (合体！ゲッターロボ; "Combine! Getter Robo"))	Getter Robo	1:14
3.	"Fumetsu no Machine Getter Robo" (Fumetsu no Mashin Gettā Robo (不滅のマシン ゲッターロボ; "Immortal Machine Getter Robo"))	Getter Robo G	0:45
4.	"Bokura no Mazinger Z" (Bokura no Majingā Zetto (ぼくらのマジンガーZ; "Our Mazinger Z"))	Mazinger Z	1:07
5.	"Yūsha wa Mazinger" (Yūsha wa Majingā (勇者はマジンガー; "The Hero Is Mazinger"))	Great Mazinger	1:09
6.	"Uchū no Ōja Grendizer" (Uchū no Ōja Gurendaizā (宇宙の王者グレンダイザー; "Monarch of Space Grendizer"))	UFO Robo Grendizer	1:05
7.	"Hiroshi no Theme" (Hiroshi no Tēma (ひろしのテーマ; "Theme of Hiroshi"))	Steel Jeeg	1:01
8.	"Taose! Galactor" (Taose! Gyarakutā (倒せ！ギャラクター; "Defeat! Galactor"))	Science Ninja Team Gatchaman	1:02
9.	"Ore wa Shinzō Ningen" ((おれは新造人間; "I Am the Neo-Human"))	Casshan	0:45
10.	"Space Knights no Uta" (Supēsunaitsu no Uta (スペースナイツの歌; "Song of the Space Knights"))	Tekkaman: The Space Knight	0:59
11.	"Aa! Gyakuten Ō" (Aa! Gyakuten Ō (嗚呼！逆転王; "Oh! Reversal King"))	Gyakuten! Ippatsuman	1:02
12.	"Eien Blue" (Eien Burū (永遠ブルー; "Forever Blue"))	Saint Seiya	1:16
13.	"Yuria... Towa ni" ((ユリア...永遠に; "Yuria... Eternally"))	Fist of the North Star	1:00
14.	"Rikiishi Tooru no Theme" (Rikiishi Tooru no Tēma (力石 徹のテーマ; "Theme of Tooru Rikiishi"))	Ashita no Joe	1:32
15.	"Joe no Komoriuta" (Jō no Komoriuta (ジョーの子守唄; "Ending Song of Joe"))	Ashita no Joe	1:30
16.	"Minashi Ji no Ballad" (Minashi Ji no Barādo (みなし児のバラード; "Ballad About Children"))	Tiger Mask	1:23
17.	"Karate Dō Otoko Dō" ((空手道おとこ道; "The Karate Path Is the Man's Path"))	Karate Baka Ichidai	0:47
18.	"Ike! Banbaban" ((行け！バンババン; "Go! Banbaban"))	Samurai Giants	0:52
19.	"Aa Seishun yo Itsudemo" ((ああ 青春よ いつまでも; "Well, Youth is Forever"))	Dokaben	0:43
20.	"Omoide ga Ippai" ((想い出がいっぱい; "Memory Is Full"))	Miyuki	1:40
21.	"Egao wo Sagashite" ((笑顔を探して; "Looking for a Smile"))	Yawara!	1:50
22.	"Bōkenshatachi no Ballad" (Bōkenshatachi no Barādo (冒険者たちのバラード; "Ballad of Adventurers"))	Gamba no Bouken	1:22
23.	"Kamchatka Hantō Rias Shiki Monogatari" (Kamuchakka Hantō Riasu Shiki Monogatari (カムチャッカ半島リアス式物語; "Story of the Kamchatka Peninsula Rias Ceremony"))	Litmus Shi Kenshi Masaki Sansei: Mata Uso (リトマス紙剣士マサキ酸性：またウソ, Ritomasu Shi Kenshi Masaki Sansei: Mata Uso; Litmus Paper Fencer Masaki Acidity: Also Lies) (Note: This is not a cover of an existing theme song, but a bass solo performed by Masaki)	1:14
24.	"Lupin Sansei Ai no Theme" (Rupan Sansei Ai no Tēma (ルパン三世 愛のテーマ; "Lupin the Third Love Theme"))	Lupin the Third Part II	1:30
25.	"Honō no Takara Mono" ((炎のたからもの; "Flame of the Empty Ones"))	The Castle of Cagliostro	1:20
26.	"Kimi wo Nosete" ((君をのせて; "Placing You"))	Laputa: Castle in the Sky	1:56
27.	"Hishō (Never End)" ((飛翔（NEVER END）; "Flying (Never End)"))	Crusher Joe	2:07
28.	"Ai no Kinjitō" ((愛の金字塔; "Pyramid of Love"))	Six God Combination Godmars	1:27
29.	"Seigi no Chōnōryoku Shōnen" ((正義の超能力少年; "Superpowered Boys of Justice"))	Babel II	1:00
30.	"Ai no Yūshatachi" ((愛の勇者たち; "Love's Heroes"))	The Ultraman	1:07
31.	"Kawaita Daichi" ((乾いた大地; "Drying Ground"))	Combat Mecha Xabungle	1:17
32.	"UFO Shōnen-dan" (Yūfō Shōnen-dan (UFO少年団; "UFO Boys Group"))	UFO Senshi Dai Apolon	0:53
33.	"Ore wa Akira da" ((おれは洸だ; "I Am Akira"))	Reideen The Brave	0:50
34.	"Hoshizora no Gaiking" (Hoshizora no Gaikingu (星空のガイキング; "Gaiking of the Starry Sky"))	Dino Mech Gaiking	0:55
35.	"Sono Na mo Takuma Uchū Pilot" (Sono Na mo Takuma Uchū Pairotto (その名もタクマ宇宙パイロット; "The Name Is Space Pilot Takuma"))	Wakusei Robo Danguard Ace	0:57
36.	"The Galaxy Express 999"	Galaxy Express 999	1:18
37.	"Waga Seishun no Arcadia" (Waga Seishun no Arukadia (わが青春のアルカディア; "Arcadia of My Youth"))	Arcadia of My Youth	1:19
38.	"Makka na Scarf" (Makka na Sukāfu (真赤なスカーフ; "Crimson Scarf"))	Space Battleship Yamato	1:57
39.	"Star Children" (Sutā Chirudoren (スターチルドレン))	Mobile Suit Gundam I	2:21
40.	"Ai Senshi" ((哀 戦士; "Soldiers of Sorrow"))	Mobile Suit Gundam II: Soldiers of Sorrow	1:48
41.	"Meguriai" ("Encounters" (めぐりあい))	Mobile Suit Gundam III: Encounters in Space	2:47
42.	"Kyōki no Hōteishiki: Theory of Madness" ((「狂気の方程式」～ Theory Of Madness; "Crazy Equation ~ Theory of Madness"))		3:30
Total length:			57:59

== Personnel ==
- Eizo Sakamoto (さかもと えいぞう, Sakamoto Eizō) - Lead vocals
- Syu - Guitar
- Masaki - Bass

with

- Katsuji - Drums
