= Animetal Marathon III =

Studio album by Animetal
- Released: October 21, 1998
- Recorded: 1998
- Studios: MIT Studio; Eggs & Shep Studio; Free Studio Yotsuya
- Genres: Heavy metal; anison
- Length: 42:17
- Language: Japanese
- Label: Sony Records
- Producer: Animetal

Animetal chronology
Best of Animetal (1998)	Animetal Marathon III (1998)	Complete First Live (1999)

Animetal Marathon III: Tsuburaya Productions Collection (アニメタル・マラソンIII ～円谷プロ編～, Animetaru Marason Surī ~Tsuburaya Puro Hen~) is the third full-length album by Japanese novelty heavy metal band Animetal, released through Sony Records on October 21, 1998. The album consists of a non-stop marathon of metal covers of theme songs of shows produced by Tsuburaya Productions and Eiji Tsuburaya, primarily the Ultra Series.

== Track listing ==
All tracks are arranged by Animetal.

No.	Title	Original tokusatsu/anime series	Length
1.	"Ultra Q Main Title/Theme of Ultra Q" (Urutora Kyū Mein Taitoru ~ Urutora Kyū no Tēma (ウルトラQメインタイトル ~ ウルトラQのテーマ))	Ultra Q	2:29
2.	"Ultraman no Uta" (Urutoraman no Uta (ウルトラマンの歌; "Song of Ultraman"))	Ultraman	0:54
3.	"Ultraseven no Uta" (Urutorasebun no Uta (ウルトラセブンの歌; "Song of Ultraseven"))	Ultraseven	0:51
4.	"Ultra Seven"	Ultraseven	0:43
5.	"Mighty Jack no Uta" (Maiti Jakku no Uta (マイティジャックの歌; "Song of Mighty Jack"))	Mighty Jack	1:07
6.	"Kyōfu no Machi" ((恐怖の町; "City of Fear"))	Kaiki Daisakusen	0:49
7.	"Kaettekita Ultraman" (Kaettekita Urutoraman (帰ってきたウルトラマン))	Return of Ultraman	1:03
8.	"MAT no Theme" (Matto no Tēma (MATのテーマ; "Theme of Monster Attack Team"))	Return of Ultraman	1:52
9.	"Mirrorman no Uta" (Mirāman no Uta (ミラーマンの歌; "Song of Mirrorman"))	Mirrorman	1:04
10.	"Ultraman Ace" (Urutoraman Ēsu (ウルトラマンA))	Ultraman Ace	0:38
11.	"TAC no Uta (Note: Incorporates Metallica's "Motorbreath")" (Takku no Uta (TACの歌; "Song of Terrible Monster Attacking Crew"))	Ultraman Ace	0:51
12.	"Redman" (Reddoman (レッドマン))	Redman	0:57
13.	"Triple Fighter no Uta" (Toripuru Faitā no Uta (トリプルファイターのうた; "Song of Triple Fighter"))	Triple Fighter	0:43
14.	"Kinkyū Shirei 10-4, 10-10" (Kinkyū Shirei Ten Fō Ten Ten (緊急指令10-4・10-10; "Emergency Orders 10-4, 10-10"))	Kinkyū Shirei 10-4, 10-10	1:00
15.	"Fireman" (Faiyāman (ファイヤーマン))	Fireman	1:33
16.	"Jumborg Ace" (Janbōgu Ēsu (ジャンボーグA))	Jumborg Ace	0:49
17.	"Tatakae! Jumborg 9 (Note: Incorporates Megadeth's "Hangar 18")" (Tatakae! Janbōgu Nain (戦え！ジャンボーグ9; "Fight! Jumborg 9"))	Jumborg Ace	1:01
18.	"Ultraman Taro" (Urutoraman Tarō (ウルトラマンタロウ))	Ultraman Taro	1:01
19.	"Ultraman Leo" (Urutoraman Reo (ウルトラマンレオ))	Ultraman Leo	1:02
20.	"Tatakae! Ultraman Leo" (Tatakae! Urutoraman Reo (戦え！ウルトラマンレオ; "Fight! Ultraman Leo"))	Ultraman Leo	1:08
21.	"Hoshizora no Ballad" (Hoshizora no Barādo (星空のバラード; "Ballad of the Starry Sky"))	Ultraman Leo	1:23
22.	"Saru no Gundan" (Saru no Gundan (猿の軍団; "Army of Apes"))	Saru no Gundan	1:28
23.	"Yuke! Born Free" (Yuke! Bōnfurī (行け！ボーンフリー; "Go! Born Free"))	Kyōryū Tankentai Born Free	0:59
24.	"Come On! Aztecaizer" (Kamon! Asutekaizā (カモン！アステカイザー))	Pro-Wres no Hoshi Aztecaser	1:04
25.	"Tatakae! Izenborg (Note: Guitar riff is loosely based on Metallica's "Enter Sandman")" (Tatakae! Aizenbōgu (戦え！アイゼンボーグ; "Fight! Izenborg"))	Dinosaur War Izenborg	1:22
26.	"Seishun no Tabidachi" ((青春の旅立ち; "Journey of Youth"))	Uchū no Yūsha Star Wolf	1:33
27.	"Kyōryū Sentai Koseidon" (Kyōryū Sentai Koseidon (恐竜戦隊コセイドン))	Dinosaur Corps Koseidon	1:08
28.	"The Ultraman (Note: Guitar riff is from UFO's "Natural Thing")" (Za Urutoraman (ザ☆ウルトラマン))	The Ultraman	1:01
29.	"Ultraman 80" (Urutoraman Eiti (ウルトラマン80))	Ultraman 80	1:00
30.	"Andromelos" (Andoromerosu (アンドロメロス))	Andromelos	1:10
31.	"Yume no Hero" (Yume no Hīrō (夢のヒーロー; "Hero of Dreams"))	Gridman the Hyper Agent	1:42
32.	"Take me Higher"	Ultraman Tiga	1:28
33.	"Ultraman Dyna" (Urutoraman Daina (ウルトラマンダイナ))	Ultraman Dyna	3:41
34.	"Kaiju Booska" (Kaijū Būsuka (快獣ブースカ))	Kaiju Booska	1:29
Total length:			42:17

== Personnel ==
- Eizo Sakamoto (坂本 英三, Sakamoto Eizō) - Lead vocals
- She-Ja (屍忌蛇, Shiija) - Guitar
- Masaki - Bass

with

- Katsuji - Drums
