= Animetal Marathon II =

Studio album by Animetal
- Released: February 21, 1998; March 21, 1998 (karaoke)
- Recorded: 1997
- Studio: MIT Studio
- Genres: Heavy metal; anison
- Length: 43:34 (Disc 1); 21:56 (Disc 2)
- Language: Japanese
- Label: Sony Records
- Producer: Animetal

Animetal chronology
Animetal Marathon (1997)	Animetal Marathon II (1998)	Animetal Lady Marathon (1998)

Animetal Marathon II: Tokusatsu Collection (アニメタル・マラソンII ～特撮編～, Animetaru Marason Tsū ~Tokusatsu Hen~) is the second album by Japanese novelty heavy metal band Animetal, released through Sony Records on February 21, 1998. The album consists of a non-stop marathon of metal covers of theme songs of tokusatsu series from the 1970s and 1980s. A karaoke version of this album was also released.

"Let's Go! Rider Kick," "Fight! Kamen Rider V3," "Setup! Kamen Rider X," "Amazon Rider Koko ni Ari," "Kamen Rider Stronger no Uta," and "Moero! Kamen Rider" were recorded separately as a marathon EP titled Tokusatsu de Ikou! Like the first marathon CD, some songs incorporate guitar riffs from well-known hard rock and heavy metal songs. Most notable is "Tatakae! Chōjin Bibyūn", which uses the guitar riff of Van Halen's "Ain't Talkin' 'Bout Love."

Animetal Marathon II includes a bonus disc containing the band's songs for the 1997 anime film Rurouni Kenshin: Ishin Shishi e no Chinkonka.

== Track listing ==
All tracks are arranged by Animetal.

Disc 1
No.	Title	Original tokusatsu series	Length
1.	"Theme of Animetal II (Ryūketsu no Sanmika)" (Animetaru no Tēma Tsū (Ryūketsu no Sanmika) (アニメタルのテーマII (流血の讃美歌); "Theme of Animetal II (Bloodshed's Eulogy Beautiful Song)"))		1:51
2.	"Let's Go! Rider Kick" (Rettsu Gō!! Raidā Kikku (レッツゴー！！ライダーキック))	Kamen Rider	0:45
3.	"Tatakae! Kamen Rider V3" (Tatakae! Kamen Raidā Bui Surī (戦え！仮面ライダーV3; "Fight! Kamen Rider V3"))	Kamen Rider V3	0:46
4.	"Setup! Kamen Rider X" (Setappu! Kamen Raidā Ekkusu (セタップ！仮面ライダーX))	Kamen Rider X	0:46
5.	"Go Go Kikaider (Note: Initial guitar riff is based on Mein Kampf's "Warning for You")" (Gō Gō Kikaidā (ゴーゴー・キカイダー))	Android Kikaider	0:41
6.	"Kikaider 01" (Kikaidā Zero Wan (キカイダー０１))	Kikaider 01	1:01
7.	"Robot Keiji" (Robotto Keiji (ロボット刑事))	Robot Detective	0:44
8.	"Tatakae Inazuman" ((戦えイナズマン; "Fight, Inazuman"))	Inazuman	1:09
9.	"Flash! Inazuman" (Furasshu! Inazuman (フラッシュ！イナズマン))	Inazuman Flash	0:57
10.	"Arashi yo Sakebe" ((嵐よ叫べ; "Shout, Arashi"))	Henshin Ninja Arashi	0:41
11.	"Kaze yo Hikari yo (Note: Initial guitar riff is partially based on Helloween's "Heavy Metal (Is the Law)")" ((風よ光よ; "Oh Wind, Oh Light"))	Kaiketsu Lion-Maru	0:50
12.	"Tetsujin Tiger Seven" (Tetsujin Taigā Sebun (鉄人タイガーセブン))	Tetsujin Tiger Seven	0:47
13.	"Tatakae! Denjin Zaborger (Note: Incorporates Dio's "Stand Up and Shout")" (Tatakae! Denjin Zabōgā (戦え！電人ザボーガー; "Fight! Denjin Zaborger"))	Denjin Zaborger	0:54
14.	"Ike Rainbowman" (Ike Reinbōman (行けレインボーマン; "Go Rainbowman"))	Warrior of Love Rainbowman	0:39
15.	"Diamond Eye (Note: Bass line is a loose parody of Motörhead's "Ace of Spades")" (Daiyamondo Ai (ダイヤモンドアイ))	Diamond Eye	0:49
16.	"Condorman (Note: Guitar riff is a loose parody of Steppenwolf's "Born to be Wild")" (Kondōruman (コンドールマン))	Condorman	1:18
17.	"Spectreman Go Go" (#Supekutoruman Gō Gō (スペクトルマン・ゴーゴー))	Spectreman	0:55
18.	"Kokyō wa Chikyū" ((故郷は地球; "My Home is the Earth"))	Silver Mask	1:23
19.	"Iron King (Note: Initial guitar riff is partially based on Dio's "We Rock")" (Aian Kingu (アイアンキング))	Iron King	0:52
20.	"Dengeki! Strada 5 (Note: Incorporates Angra's "Carry On")" (Dengeki! Sutorada Faibu (電撃！ストラダ５; "Blitzkrieg! Strada 5"))	Strada 5	0:51
21.	"Wild 7" (Wairudo Sebun (ワイルドセブン))	Wild 7	1:01
22.	"Bokura no Barom-1" (Bokura no Baromu Wan (ぼくらのバロム１; "Our Barom-1"))	Barom-1	1:01
23.	"Shōri da! Akumaizer 3 (Note: Incorporates Anthrax's "Madhouse")" (Shōri da! Akumaizā Surī (勝利だ！アクマイザー３; "The Victory! Akumaizer 3"))	Akumaizer 3	1:06
24.	"Tatakae! Chōjin Bibyūn (Note: Incorporates Van Halen's "Ain't Talkin' 'Bout Love")" ((斗え！！超神ビビューン; "Fight! Chōjin Bibyūn"))	Chōjin Bibyūn	1:17
25.	"Kagayaku Taiyō Kagestar" (Kagayaku Taiyō Kagesutā (輝く太陽カゲスター; "Shining Sun Kagestar"))	The Kagestar	0:51
26.	"Tatakae Ninja Captor" (Tatakae Ninja Kyaputā (斗え忍者キャプター; "Fight Ninja Captor"))	Ninja Captor	1:04
27.	"Jigoku no Zubat" (Jigoku no Zubatto (地獄のズバット; "Zubat of Hell"))	Kaiketsu Zubat	1:17
28.	"Uchū Tetsujin Kyōdain" ((宇宙鉄人キョーダイン))	Space Ironman Kyodain	0:58
29.	"Oh! Daitetsujin 17" (Ō!! Daitetsujin Wan Sebun (オー！！大鉄人ワンセブン))	Daitetsujin 17	1:38
30.	"Uchū Keiji Gavan (Note: Initial and final guitar riffs are based on Yngwie Malmsteen's "Rising Force")" (Uchū Keiji Gyaban (宇宙刑事ギャバン))	Space Sheriff Gavan	1:18
31.	"Uchū Keiji Sharivan" (Uchū Keiji Shariban (宇宙刑事シャリバン))	Space Sheriff Sharivan	1:37
32.	"Uchū Keiji Shaider (Note: Incorporates the opening guitar riff of Iron Maiden's "The Trooper")" (Uchū Keiji Shaidā (宇宙刑事シャイダー))	Space Sheriff Shaider	1:06
33.	"Kagaku Sentai Dynaman (Note: Incorporates Loudness's "Crazy Doctor")" (Kagaku Sentai Dainaman (科学戦隊ダイナマン))	Kagaku Sentai Dynaman	1:18
34.	"J.A.K.Q. Dengekitai" (Jakkā Dengekitai (ジャッカー電撃隊))	J.A.K.Q. Dengekitai	1:18
35.	"Susume! Gorenger" (Susume! Gorenjā (進め！ゴレンジャー; "Advance! Gorenger"))	Himitsu Sentai Gorenger	1:09
36.	"Himitsu Sentai Gorenger" (Himitsu Sentai Gorenjā (秘密戦隊ゴレンジャー))	Himitsu Sentai Gorenger	1:04
37.	"Amazon Rider Koko ni Ari" (Amazon Raidā Koko ni Ari (アマゾンライダーここにあり; "Amazon Rider is Here"))	Kamen Rider Amazon	1:01
38.	"Kamen Rider Stronger no Uta" (Kamen Raidā Sutorongā no Uta (仮面ライダーストロンガーのうた; "Song of Kamen Rider Stronger"))	Kamen Rider Stronger	1:01
39.	"Moero! Kamen Rider" (Moero! Kamen Raidā (燃えろ！仮面ライダー; "Burn! Kamen Rider"))	Kamen Rider (Skyrider)	1:27
40.	"Ending Theme of Animetal (Saigo no Komoriuta)" (Animetaru no Endingu Tēma (Saigo no Komoriuta) (アニメタルのエンディング・テーマ(最期の子守唄); "Ending Theme of Animetal (The Last Lullaby)"))		0:46
Total length:			43:34

Disc 2
No.	Title	Lyrics	Music	Length
1.	"Shukuteki Kenzan!" ((宿敵見参！; "Meeting the Old Enemy!"))	Yū Aku	Masaaki Hirao; Chumei Watanabe; Asei Kobayashi; Shunsuke Kikuchi; Hiroshi Miyagawa	8:24
2.	"The Jūppon Gatana" (Za Jūppon Gatana (The 十本刀; "The Ten Swords"))	Aku	Hirao; Miyagawa; Kikuchi; Kobayashi; Watanabe	8:23
3.	"Towa no Mirai" ((永遠の未来; "Eternal Future"))	Yukinojo Mori	Toshiaki Yamazaki	5:08
Total length:				21:56

== Personnel ==
- Eizo Sakamoto (坂本 英三, Sakamoto Eizō) - Lead vocals
- She-Ja (屍忌蛇, Shiija) - Guitar, backing vocals ("Tetsujin Tiger Seven")
- Masaki - Bass, backing vocals ("Tatakae! Chōjin Bibyūn")

with

- Katsuji - Drums
- Mie - Backing vocals on "Susume! Gorenger"
