= Animetal Marathon V =

Studio album by Animetal
- Released: June 25, 2003
- Recorded: 2003
- Studios: Freiheit; U'sus Waseda Studio; MIT Studio
- Genres: Heavy metal; anison
- Length: 56:38
- Language: Japanese
- Label: VAP
- Producer: Yorimasa Hisatake

Animetal chronology
Animetal Lady Marathon II (2002)	Animetal Marathon V (2003)	The Animetal: Re-Birth Heroes (2004)

Alternate cover
- European release cover

Animetal Marathon V (アニメタル・マラソンV, Animetaru Marason Faibu) is the fifth full-length album by Japanese novelty heavy metal band Animetal, released through VAP on June 25, 2003. The album consists of a non-stop marathon of metal covers: tracks cover anime themes from the 1960s to the 1990s, while tracks 18-34 cover tokusatsu themes also from that same era, including Super Sentai and Kamen Rider titles, and tracks 35-39 are covers of themes from Tatsunoko's Time Bokan series. Prior to the release of this album, guitarist She-Ja left the band. He was replaced by Syu, who has worked with metal bands Galneryus and Aushvitz.

The album cover depicts the band trio as the Black Tri-Stars of the Mobile Suit Gundam series.

Animetal Marathon V was released in the European market by Wasabi Records in 2006, with an anime-oriented cover art. A limited edition release included a bonus DVD.

== Track listing ==
All tracks are arranged by Syu, Masaki, Katsuji, and Yorimasa Hisatake.

CD
No.	Title	Original anime/tokusatsu series	Length
1.	"Satsuriko no Jūika" ((殺戮の十字架; "Cross of Slaughter"))		2:06
2.	"Pegasus Fantasy" (Pegasasu Fantajī (ペガサス幻想))	Saint Seiya	1:30
3.	"Tōshi Gordian (Note: Incorporates intro riff from Racer X's "Street Lethal")" (Tōshi Gōdian (闘士ゴーディアン))	Gordian Warrior	1:22
4.	"Chōjin Sentai Balatack" ((超人戦隊バラタック; "Superhuman Squadron Barattack"))	Chōjin Sentai Balatack	1:24
5.	"Tri-attack! Mechander Robo" (Toraiatakku! Mekandā Robo (トライアタック！メカンダーロボ))	Gasshin Sentai Mechander Robo	1:12
6.	"Starzinger no Uta" (Sutājingā no Uta (スタージンガーの歌; "Song of Starzinger"))	SF Saiyuki Starzinger	1:05
7.	"Roller Hero Muteking" (Rōrā Hīrō Mutekingu (ローラーヒーロー・ムテキング))	Tondemo Senshi Muteking	1:14
8.	"Midnight Submarine (Note: Incorporates Judas Priest's "Living After Midnight")" (Middonaito Sabumarin (ミッドナイト・サブマリン))	Mirai Keisatsu Urashiman	1:34
9.	"Yume no Funanori" ((夢の舟乗り; "Dream's Boat Riding"))	Captain Future	1:02
10.	"Kinnikuman Go Fight!" (Kin'nikuman Gō Faito! (キン肉マン Go Fight！))	Kinnikuman	1:03
11.	"Honō no Kinnikuman" ((炎のキン肉マン; "Blazing Kinnikuman"))	Kinnikuman	1:21
12.	"Tough Boy"	Fist of the North Star 2	1:41
13.	"Yoroshiku Tuning (Note: Contains a guitar riff from Van Halen's "Panama")" (Yoroshiku Chūningu (よろしくチューニング; "Pleasure Tuning"))	Yoroshiku Mechadock	1:10
14.	"Moero Hero" (Moete Hīrō (燃えてヒーロー; "Burning Hero"))	Captain Tsubasa	1:!4
15.	"Touch (Note: Incorporates Metallica's "Battery")" (Tatchi (タッチ))	Touch	1:43
16.	"The Chanbara" (Za Chanbara (ザ・チャンバラ))	Manga Mito-Kōmon	1:10
17.	"Lupin Sansei no Theme" (Rupan Sansei no Tēma (ルパン三世のテーマ; "Theme of Lupin the Third"))	Lupin the Third Part II	1:12
18.	"Battle Fever J" (Batoru Fībā Jei (バトルフィーバーJ))	Battle Fever J	1:09
19.	"Aa Denshi Sentai Denjiman" ((ああ電子戦隊デンジマン; "Oh, Electron Squadron Denjiman"))	Denshi Sentai Denjiman	1:02
20.	"Taiyo Sentai Sun Vulcan (Note: Incorporates Rainbow's "Stargazer")" (Taiyō Sentai Sanbarukan (太陽戦隊サンバルカン; "Solar Squadron Sun Vulcan"))	Taiyo Sentai Sun Vulcan	1:43
21.	"Dai Sentai Goggle-V" (Dai Sentai Gōguru Faibu (大戦隊ゴーグルV; "Great Squadron Goggle-V"))	Dai Sentai Goggle-V	1:14
22.	"Choudenshi Bioman" (Chōdenshi Baioman (超電子バイオマン; "Super Electron Bioman"))	Choudenshi Bioman	1:03
23.	"Choujyu Sentai Liveman (Note: Incorporates Judas Priest's "Breaking the Law")" (Chōjū Sentai Raibuman (超獣戦隊ライブマン; "Super Beast Squadron Liveman"))	Choujyu Sentai Liveman	1:16
24.	"Red Baron" (Reddo Baron (レッドバロン))	Super Robot Red Baron	1:16
25.	"Mach Baron (Note: Incorporates the opening drum riff of Led Zeppelin's "Rock and Roll")" (Mahhabaron (マッハバロン))	Super Robot Mach Baron	1:35
26.	"Otoko no Misao ~Seishun Ichigo Ichie~" ((男の操 ～青春一期一会～; "Man of Virtue ~Youth Comes Once in a Lifetime~"))	Yūga Kizoku Masaki Baron: Uso (優雅貴族マサキバロン：ウソ, Elegant Nobility Masaki Baron: Lie) (Note: Not a cover of an existing theme song, but a bass solo by Masaki)	0:49
27.	"Ganbaron '77" (Ganbaron Nanajūnana (ガンバロン '77))	Chiisana Superman Ganbaron	1:13
28.	"Ikuzo! BD7" (Ikuzo! Bī Dī Sebun (行くぞ！BD7; "Let's Go! BD7"))	Shōnen Tanteidan BD7	1:45
29.	"Tatakae! Dragon (Note: Incorporates Guns N' Roses' "It's So Easy")" (Tatakae! Doragon (闘え！ドラゴン; "Fight! Dragon"))	Tatakae! Dragon	0:57
30.	"Kakero Bankid (Note: Incorporates Black Sabbath's "War Pigs")" (Kakero Bankiddo (駆けろバンキッド; "Run, Bankid"))	Enban Sensō Bankid	1:13
31.	"Ryūsei Ningen Zone" (Ryūsei Ningen Zōn (流星人間ゾーン; "Meteor Human Zone"))	Ryūsei Ningen Zone	0:59
32.	"Kamen Rider Super-1" (Kamen Raidā Sūpā Wan (仮面ライダー スーパー1))	Kamen Rider Super-1	1:16
33.	"Kamen Rider Black" (Kamen Raidā Burakku (仮面ライダーBLACK))	Kamen Rider Black	1:25
34.	"Kamen Rider Black RX" (Kamen Raidā Burakku Āru Ekkusu (仮面ライダーBLACK RX))	Kamen Rider Black RX	1:30
35.	"Gyakuten! Ippatsuman" (Gyakuten Ippatsuman (逆転イッパツマン) "Reversal! Ippatsuman")	Gyakuten! Ippatsuman	0:59
36.	"Yattodetaman no Uta" ((ヤットデタマンの歌; "Song of Yattodetaman"))	Yattodetaman	1:29
37.	"Otasukeman no Uta" ((オタスケマンの歌; "Song of Otasukeman"))	Otasukeman	1:04
38.	"Zenderman no Uta" (Zendaman no Uta (ゼンダマンの歌; "Song of Zenderman"))	Zenderman	1:15
39.	"Yatterman no Uta" (Yattāman no Uta (ヤッターマンの歌; "Song of Yatterman"))	Yatterman	1:09
40.	"Zankoku na Tenshi no Tēze" ((残酷な天使のテーゼ; "A Cruel Angel's Thesis"))	Neon Genesis Evangelion	2:19
41.	"Tomorrow Never Die"		3:20
Total length:			56:38

European release limited edition DVD
No.	Title	Length
1.	"Medley Cat's Eye / Dragon Ball" (Music Video)
2.	"Medley Magiranger / Dekaranger" (Music Video)

== Personnel ==
- Eizo Sakamoto (さかもと えいぞう, Sakamoto Eizō) - Lead vocals
- Syu - Guitar
- Masaki - Bass

with

- Katsuji - Drums
