= Animetal Lady Marathon II =

Studio album by Animetal Lady
- Released: April 10, 2002
- Studios: Freiheit; Sound Arts
- Genres: Heavy metal; anison
- Length: 30:01
- Language: Japanese
- Label: Cutting Edge Records
- Producer: Yorimasa Hisatake

Animetal Lady chronology
Animetal Marathon IV (1991)	Animetal Lady Marathon II (2002)	Animetal Marathon V (2003)

Animetal Lady Marathon II (アニメタル・レディー・マラソンII, Animetaru Redī Marason Tsū) is the second and final studio album by Animetal Lady (Animetal with Mie of Pink Lady as the vocalist). Released through Cutting Edge Records on April 10, 2002, the album consists of a non-stop marathon of metal covers of shōjo anime theme songs, children's anime theme songs, and other anime theme songs sung by women. It features a guest appearance by former Megadeth guitarist Marty Friedman. At 30 minutes long, Animetal Lady Marathon II is the shortest studio album in Animetal's discography.

== Track listing ==
All tracks are arranged by Animetal Lady except track 23 by Kohichi Seiyama.

No.	Title	Original anime	Length
1.	"Chinurareta Romance -Instrumental-" (Chinurareta Romansu -Instrumental- (血塗られたロマンス -Instrumental-; "Bloody Romance"))		1:05
2.	"Time Bokan (Note: Incorporates Iron Maiden's "Where Eagles Dare")" (Taimu Bokan (タイムボカン))	Time Bokan	2:08
3.	"Jim Button no Uta" (Jimu Botan no Uta (ジムボタンの歌; "Song of Jim Button"))	Jim Button and Luke the Engine Driver	1:24
4.	"La Seine no Hoshi" (Ra Sēnu no Hoshi (ラ・セーヌの星; "The Star of the Seine"))	La Seine no Hoshi	1:10
5.	"Hatena no Boomerang" (Hatena no Būmeran (？のブーメラン; "Question Mark Boomerang"))	Mitsume ga Tōru	1:05
6.	"Dororo no Uta" ((どろろの歌; "Song of Dororo"))	Dororo	1:03
7.	"Onbu Obake" ((おんぶおばけ))	Onbu Obake	1:03
8.	"Dororon Enma-kun" ((ドロロンえん魔くん))	Dororon Enma-kun	1:03
9.	"Jungle Kurobe no Uta" (Janguru Kurobee no Uta (ジャングル黒べえの歌; "Song of Jungle Kurobe"))	Jungle Kurobe	0:48
10.	"Yarozo Ippatsu! Yakkyūdō" ((やるぞ一発！野球道; "I'll Win the Game! Baseball Path"))	Ippatsu Kanta-kun	0:53
11.	"Harris no Kaze" (Harisu no Kaze (ハリスの旋風; "Harris' Wind"))	Harris no Kaze	1:13
12.	"Kerokko Demetan" ((けろっこデメタン))	Demetan Croaker, The Boy Frog	2:18
13.	"Midori no Hidamari" ((緑の陽だまり; "Green Hidamari"))	Fables of the Green Forest	1:13
14.	"Wansaka Wansa-kun" ((わんさかワンサくん; "A Lot of Little Wansa"))	Little Wansa	0:49
15.	"Yoake no Michi" ((よあけのみち; "Path of Dawn"))	Dog of Flanders	0:43
16.	"Nagagutsu o Haita Neko" ((長靴をはいた猫; "Puss in Boots"))	Puss in Boots	0:37
17.	"Wakakusa no Charlotte" (Wakakusa no Sharurotto (若草のシャルロット; "The Young Grass of Charlotte"))	Wakakusa no Charlotte	2:05
18.	"Sōgen no Shōjo Laura" (Sōgen no Shōjo Rōra (草原の少女ローラ))	Laura, the Prairie Girl	1:14
19.	"Paul no Bōken" (Pōru no Bōken (ポールの冒険; "Paul's Adventure"))	Paul's Miraculous Adventure	0:46
20.	"Kashi no Ki Mock" (Kashi no Ki Mokku (樫の木モック; "Mock of the Oak Tree"))	Pinocchio: The Series	1:10
21.	"Pyun Pyun Maru no Uta" ((ピュンピュン丸の歌; "Song of Pyun Pyun Maru"))	Pyun Pyun Maru	1:04
22.	""Anpanman March"" (Anpanman no Māchi (アンパンマンのマーチ))	Anpanman	2:17
23.	"Chinurareta Romance (Reprise)" (Chinurareta Romansu (Reprise) (血塗られたロマンス (Reprise); "Bloody Romance (Reprise)"))		1:07
Total length:			30:01

== Personnel ==
- Mie (未唯, Mī) – lead vocals
- She-Ja (屍忌蛇, Shiija) – guitar
- Masaki – bass

with

- Katsuji – drums
- Kohichi Seiyama (盛山 浩一, Seiyama Kōichi) – keyboards (1, 3, 5, 7, 10, 13, 20, 22–23)
- Marty Friedman – lead guitar (17)
