= Whirlwind! Iron Leaguer =

Japanese anime television series

- 疾風！アイアンリーガー
- Genre: Mecha, Sports
- Created by: Hajime Yatate
- Developed by: Yoshitake Suzuki
- Directed by: Tetsurō Amino
- Music by: Kaoru Wada
- Country of origin: Japan
- Original language: Japanese
- No. of episodes: 52

Production
- Producers: Tomoyuki Ikeda (TV Tokyo); Keisuke Iwata (TV Tokyo); Masakatsu Kozuru (Sotsu Agency); Masahiko Minami (Sunrise)
- Production companies: TV Tokyo; Sotsu Agency; Sunrise

Original release
- Network: TXN (TV Tokyo)
- Release: April 6, 1993 – March 29, 1994

Related
- Original video animation

Shippū! Iron Leaguer Ginhikari no Hata no Shita ni
- Directed by: Tetsurō Amino
- Produced by: Masahiko Minami; Kazumi Kawashiro; Shigeru Watanabe (supervisor)
- Written by: Shō Aikawa
- Music by: Kaoru Wada
- Studio: Sunrise
- Released: November 21, 1994 – April 25, 1995
- Episodes: 5

Whirlwind! Iron Leaguer (Japanese: 疾風！アイアンリーガー, Hepburn: Shippū! Aian Rīgā) is an anime television series produced by Sunrise. Directed by Tetsurō Amino and featuring mecha designs by Kunio Okawara, it premiered on TV Tokyo on April 6, 1993, and ended its run on March 29, 1994, spanning a total of 52 episodes.

An original video animation (OVA) titled Shippū! Iron Leaguer Silver no Hata no Shita ni (疾風！アイアンリーガー 銀光の旗の下に; "Whirlwind! Iron Leaguer: Under the Banner of Silver Light") was released between November 21, 1994, and April 25, 1995.

== Characters ==
The Iron Leaguer team. From left to right: GZ, Kiai Ryuken, Mach Windy, Magnum Ace, Bull Armor, Jurota Kiwami and Topjoy

=== Iron Leaguers ===
- Magnum Ace (マグナムエース, Magunamu Ēsu) Baseball Leaguer. Voiced by Yasunori Matsumoto.
- Mach Windy (マッハウィンディ, Mahha Windi) Soccer Leaguer. Voiced by Ryōtarō Okiayu.
- Kiai Ryuken (キアイリュウケン, Kiai Ryūken) Karate Leaguer. Voiced by Ryo Horikawa.
- Bull Armor (ブルアーマー, Buru Āmā) Football Leaguer. Voiced by Chafurin.
- Jūrōta Kiwami (極 十郎太, Kiwami Jūrōta) Kendo Leaguer. Voiced by Kappei Yamaguchi.
- Top Joy (トップジョイ, Toppu Joi) Basketball Leaguer. Voiced by Jūrōta Kosugi.
- GZ (ジーゼット, Jī Zetto) Hockey Leaguer. Voiced by Yukitoshi Hori.

=== Gold Brothers ===
- Gold Arm - Baseball Leaguer. Voiced by Yanada Kiyoyuki.
- Gold Foot - Soccer Leaguer. Voiced by Fumihiko Tachiki.
- Gold Mask - Baseball Leaguer. Voiced by Shinichiro Ohta.

=== Humans ===
- Ruri Ginjō (ルリー銀城, Rurī Ginjō)
- Coach Eddie Ginjō
- Ricardo Ginjō
- Hiroshi (ヒロシ)
- Mariko (マリコ)
- Bezu Bezu (ベズベズ)
- Pot (ポット)
- Gerus (ゲルス)

== Music ==
Opening Theme
"Iron Leaguer ~ Kagirinaki Shimei (アイアンリーガー～限りなき使命, Aian Rīgā~Kagirinaki Shimei; lit. 'Iron Leaguer (Limitless Mission)') by Atsuo Tanimoto
Ending Theme

1. "Dreamy Planets" by Chisa Yokoyama (eps 1-26)
2. "Warera! Iron Leaguer" (我等!アイアンリーガー, Warera! Aian Rīgā; lit. 'Us! Iron Leaguer') by Yasunori Matsumoto and Ryotaro Okiayu (eps 27–51)
3. With ~ Tomo yo Tomo ni" (WITH～友よ共に; lit. 'WITH (Friend to Both)') by Atsuo Tanimoto (ep 52)

Original Soundtrack by Kaoru Wada \

== Video games ==
An action video game based on Shippū! Iron Leaguer was released in Japan for Game Boy on March 11, 1994. Characters from the series appear in the game Super Robot Wars NEO for the Wii.

Shippū! Iron Leaguer also made an appearance in Super Robot Wars X-Ω.
