= Tekkaman: The Space Knight =

Japanese anime television series

- Italian DVD cover
- 宇宙の騎士テッカマン
- Genre: Superhero, science fiction
- Created by: Tatsunoko Production Planning Office
- Directed by: Hiroshi Sasagawa; Hisayuki Toriumi
- Music by: Bob Sakuma
- Country of origin: Japan
- Original language: Japanese
- No. of episodes: 26

Production
- Executive producer: Tatsuo Yoshida
- Producers: Ippei Kuri; Shinichi Miyazaki
- Production companies: NET; Tatsunoko Production

Original release
- Network: ANN (NET)
- Release: July 2 – December 24, 1975

Tekkaman: The Space Knight (宇宙の騎士テッカマン, Uchū no Kishi Tekkaman) is a Japanese anime produced by Tatsunoko Production in 1975. A short-lived English adaptation aired in the U.S. in 1984. The first 13 episodes streamed in Japanese with English subtitles on Anime Sols as of spring 2013 exclusively in North America, but the website is now defunct. All 26 episodes were streaming on Viewster in several countries until the website went defunct in 2019. In the 1990s, it was followed by the much more popular Tekkaman Blade, which was dubbed in the U.S. by Saban as Teknoman.

== Plot ==
The Earth has entered the 21st century, and it is in peril. The "Green Earth" project has been abandoned, and scientists look to the stars to find a "Second Earth". The "Space Angel", on its mission to find this "Second Earth", is attacked by a group of aliens named the "Waldarians". The "Space Angel", commanded by the father of hot-headed young space pilot Joji Minami (Barry Gallagher in the English dub), is destroyed and with it the hope of mankind.

Professor Souzou Amachi (Dr. Richardson) develops the powerful new alloy "tekka" and manages to create the Gigantor-like flying robot "Pegas" and the "Teksetter" system it contains, designed to combat the aliens by augmenting a human with a certain wavelength into the mighty Tekkaman, an indestructible armor-clad "Space Knight" endowed with enhanced strength, the ability to survive in space, and the deadly twin-bladed "Tek Lancer" that can slice through the hull of a spaceship as if it were paper.

Joji is given the ability to transform into Tekkaman and ride through space on the back of Pegas. Now along with Prof. Amachi's tech-savvy daughter Hiromi (Patricia Richardson) and the sardonic blond-afroed Andro and squirrel-like little Mutan who are from the far-off frozen planet Sanno and possess the power of teleportation, he fights to rid the dying Earth from the threat of the "Waldaster" and continue to research the "Leap Flight Engine" to reach a new home for humanity.

== Production ==
The opening theme, "Tekkaman no Uta", is sung by Ichirou Mizuki, written by Tatsunoko's Planning Department (lyrics) and Asei Kobayashi (music) and arranged by Bob Sakuma, who composed all the music for the series. The character designs were done by Yoshitaka Amano (of Final Fantasy fame). The show was intended to run for 52 episodes, but was cancelled after 26 episodes. The reasons for the show's cancellation currently remain unknown.

An English-language version was created by a small independent company called William Winckler Productions, but the dub was cancelled in mid-story with only 13 of the show's 26 episodes produced.

Over forty-thousand original Tekkaman the Space Knight VHS video cassettes were successfully sold throughout the U.S. to major retail stores by Congress Video Group (the largest video distributor at the time), and later by L.D. Video. Congress Video sold half-hour episodes, whereas L.D. Video sold two 96-minute film compilations.

William Winckler attempted to stay as true to the original Japanese series as possible, with as little editing of violence as possible, and retaining all the original Japanese music and sound effects. This was in stark contrast to Science Ninja Team Gatchaman, another Tatsunoko series which was dubbed by Sandy Frank as Battle of the Planets.

=== Japanese cast ===
- Katsuji Mori as Joji Minami/Tekkaman
- Kan Tokumaru as Pegas
- Junpei Takiguchi as Rambos
- Kazue Komiya as Mutan
- Kenji Utsumi as Chief Amachi
- Miyuki Ueda as Hiromi
- Shinji Nakae as Narrator
- Takeshi Kuwabara as Dovrai
- Yasuo Yamada as Andro Umeda
- Yuzuru Fujimoto as Jupiter

=== English cast ===
- Bill Hedderly Jr. as Barry Gallagher / Tekkaman
- Kathy Pruitt as Patricia Richardson / Mutan
- Reginald Bennett as Andro
- Clancy Syrko as Pegas / Randrox / Narrator
- Jean Veloz as Mutan / Computer
- Robert Winckler as Dr. Richardson / Emperor Devoral

== Episode list ==
No.	Title	Original release date
1	"Hero of the Sun / N/A" (太陽の勇者)	June 2, 1975
2	"The Stellar Rogue Cluster, Waldastar / N/A" (悪党星団ワルダスター)	June 9, 1975
3	"The Shadow-Hunting Alien! / N/A" (影狩り宇宙人)	June 16, 1975
4	"The Birth of the Space Knights! / N/A" (スペース・ナイツ誕生)	June 23, 1975
5	"The Great Asteroid Plot! / N/A" (アステロイド大作戦)	June 30, 1975
6	"Lunar Quicksand / N/A" (月面アリ地獄)	August 6, 1975
7	"Space Transport K-432 / N/A" (宇宙輸送船K432)	August 13, 1975
8	"The Man-Eating Space Plant / N/A" (宇宙の食人草)	August 20, 1975
9	"The Shinobi-I Space Ninjas / N/A" (宇宙忍者シノビーノ)	August 27, 1975
10	"The Rascally Tekkaman Team Takes Action / N/A" (わんぱくテッカマン隊大活躍)	September 3, 1975
11	"The Lost Spaceship / N/A" (失われた宇宙船)	September 10, 1975
12	"Charge! The Robot Army! / The Robots Rescue Pegas" (激突!ロボット軍団)	September 17, 1975
13	"The Daring Space Skirmish / N/A" (決死の宇宙海戦)	September 24, 1975
14	"The Giant Planet Draws Near" (せまる巨大惑星)	October 3, 1975
15	"The Plan to Destroy Humanity" (地球人ぜんめつ作戦)	October 8, 1975
16	"The Micro Anteans" (ミクロ・アリ星人)	October 15, 1975
17	"The Great Space Bird Hiyokudar" (宇宙怪鳥ヒヨクダー)	October 22, 1975
18	"The Spinning Tek Lancer!" (大回転・テックランサー)	October 29, 1975
19	"The Space Land Plan" (宇宙ランド作戦)	November 5, 1975
20	"The Space Robot, Ganilla" (宇宙ロボット・ガニラ)	November 12, 1975
21	"Standoff! The Witness Girl" (対決!ぼうけん少女)	November 19, 1975
22	"Andro in Greatest Peril" (アンドロー危機いっぱつ)	November 26, 1975
23	"Voltekka Three-Part Retaliation" (ボルテッカ三段返し)	December 3, 1975
24	"Shatter the Ghost Machine!" (砕け!魔のお化けメカ)	December 10, 1975
25	"The Kid Hero's Challenge" (ちびっ子勇者の挑戦)	December 17, 1975
26	"Tekkaman Victorious" (勝利のテッカマン)	December 24, 1975

== Appearances in other media ==
Tekkaman, Andro, and Dovrai appear in the PlayStation fighting game Tatsunoko Fight as playable fighters representing their series. Tekkaman reappears in both versions of Tatsunoko vs. Capcom with the Wii version also having Tekkaman Blade; Tekkaman's mini-game involves him throwing his Tek Lancer against a horde of Waldester fighters from the early part of series.

Tekkaman also appears in the crossover anime series Infini-T Force co-produced by Tatsunoko and Digital Frontier which aired from October 3 to December 26, 2017.

== See also ==
- Tekkaman Blade
