= The Kagestar =

Japanese television series

- Also known as: ザ・カゲスター; Za Kagesutā
- Genre: Tokusatsu, superhero
- Created by: Saburo Yatsude
- Written by: Fumio Ishimori
- Directed by: Akira Kashima
- Starring: Naoki Tachibana; Emi Hayakawa; Goro Naya
- Country of origin: Japan
- Original language: Japanese
- No. of episodes: 34

Production
- Running time: 30 min. approx
- Production companies: NET; Toei Company; Daiko

Original release
- Network: ANN (NET)
- Release: 5 April 1976 – 29 March 1977

The Kagestar (ザ・カゲスター, Za Kagesutā) is a 1976–77 Toei live action tokusatsu television series in which shadow puppeteer turned salaryman Kageo Sugata (Naoki Tachibana) gains the ability to merge with his shadow and transform into a hero known as Kagestar, thanks to an electric shock received while rescuing his wealthy boss's daughter Suzuko (Emi Hayakawa) from kidnappers.

An Evel Knievel-inspired superhero with a manga-eyed helmet and a swirling star-spangled striped cape he can use like a weapon, Kagestar rides a winged white motorcycle called the KageroCar that he keeps housed in a big and quite bizarre-looking aircraft called the Kagebuse, which he summons with his flashlight gun. He can also bring his shadow to life in giant form to battle the forces of evil.

While Kagestar initially fought animal-themed costumed crooks patterned after American superhero comics early in the show’s run, in later episodes his foes became Kamen Rider-style mutated monsters created by his archenemy Dr. Satan (Goro Naya), a former Nazi scientist turned megalomaniacal mastermind also identified in some English language sources as Dr. Saturn.

Kagestar is assisted by the similarly empowered Suzuko who transforms into his white-skirted partner Bellestar. She rides a motorcycle of her own called the BelleCar and has a small bell on her bracelet that rings to warn her of danger.

== Cast ==
- Masao Komatsu
- Akiji Kobayashi
