= Animetal =

Japanese heavy metal band

Animetal アニメタル
- Origin: Japan
- Genres: Heavy metal; speed metal; power metal; anison; thrash metal
- Years active: 1996–1999, 2001–2006, 2026–present
- Labels: Sony Music Japan; Cutting Edge; VAP
- Members: Eizo Sakamoto; Masaki; Syu
- Past members: She-Ja; Mie
- Website: Official website at Sony Music Japan

Animetal (Japanese: アニメタル, Hepburn: Animetaru) is a Japanese heavy metal band who specializes in metal covers of theme songs from classic and modern anime and tokusatsu television series.

It is composed of several luminaries of the Japanese metal scene, most notably vocalist Eizo Sakamoto, who has been involved off and on with Anthem as well as participating in various other projects including the pop rock group Nerima, the JAM Project, and a successful solo career where he also plays lead guitar as well as vocals.

Animetal went on hiatus in July 1999, before resuming activities in 2001, after switching record labels. Following a tenth anniversary tour, the band began an indefinite hiatus in October 2006. Sakamoto then began a similar project called Eizo Japan, but in 2013 he announced that he and She-Ja were reforming Animetal as Aisenshi. After 20 years, Sakamoto, Masaki and Syu reunited as Animetal for a 30th anniversary tour in 2026.

== Style ==
Their music is speed metal and power metal, especially on the guitarists' (initially She-Ja for the first four albums, then Syu from Animetal Marathon V to the present) and bassist Masaki's parts. Masaki, in particular from Animetal Marathon IV onward, has shown an intensely active and aggressive approach to his instrument with fluid soloing, manic slapping and popping, energetic fills, and crashing chords for punctuation.

Part of the band's nostalgic factor is their incorporation of popular rock-metal instrumentals into some of the songs. For instance, their version of "Choujuu Sentai Liveman" is played to the tune of Judas Priest's "Breaking the Law".

The lyrics are almost entirely in Japanese with occasional lines of "Engrish", which may partly account for why they are virtually unknown outside Japan, except that they are admittedly playing to a very small niche market. For a short time, they incorporated Pink Lady member Mie into the band, hence the name change to "Animetal Lady", and recorded two albums with her distinctive and melodic vocals that are much more commercially accessible than the rest of the Animetal discography.

While they're known more for their covers, the band has a few original songs, including the ballad "Eternal Future" (永遠の未来, Towa no Mirai) from the Rurouni Kenshin film.

== Animetal USA ==
In 2011, Animetal USA (アニメタルUSA) was formed as a tribute to Sakamoto's band, performing English-language metal covers of popular anime and tokusatsu themes. The band consisted of Obsession lead vocalist Michael Vescera, Impellitteri guitarist Chris Impellitteri, former Ozzy Osbourne, Quiet Riot, and Whitesnake bassist Rudy Sarzo, and Judas Priest drummer Scott Travis. They released their self-titled debut album on October 12. A year later, Travis left the band to focus on touring with Judas Priest; he was replaced by Jon Dette before the band released their second album Animetal USA W on June 6.

== Animetal the Second ==
Animetal the Second 二代目アニメタル
- Origin: Japan
- Genres: Heavy metal; anison
- Years active: 2015–present
- Label: Gr8! Records
- Members: Queen.M
- Website: Official website at Sony Music Japan

A project titled Animetal the Second (二代目アニメタル, Nidaime Animetaru), centered around anonymous female vocalist Queen.M, was started in 2015 to continue the Animetal tradition. Its self-titled debut album was released on March 25 by Gr8! Records and features musicians such as Akira Takasaki and Masayoshi Yamashita of Loudness, Warren DeMartini, and George Lynch. It was followed up in April 2016 with Blizzard of Animetal the Second, which features Scotti Hill, Paul Gilbert, Richie Kotzen, Luke Takamura, and Saki. Animetal the Second made an appearance at Ozzfest Japan 2015.

== Personnel ==
=== Current members ===
- Eizo Sakamoto – vocals (1996–2006, 2026–present)
- Masaki – bass (1997–2006, 2026–present)
- Syu – guitar (2003–2006, 2026–present)

=== Former members ===
- Katsuji – drums (1997–2006)
- Mie – lead vocals in Animetal Lady (1997–1998, 2002)
- Kouichi Seiyama – keyboards (1997–1998, 2002)
- She-Ja – guitar (1997–2002)
- Yasuhiro Umezawa – drums (1997–1998)

=== Guest members ===
- Yasufumi Shinozuka – guitar on "Animetal" (1996)
- Yō Okamura – bass on "Animetal" (1996)
- Devil Miyamoto – drum programming on "Animetal" (1996)
- Take-Shit – bass on "This is Animetal" (1997)
- Munetaka Higuchi – drums on "Animetal Summer" and "Sentimetal" (1997)
- Rei Atsumi – keyboards on "Animetal Lady Kenzan!" (1997) and Animetal Lady Marathon (1998)
- Hiroyuki Namba – keyboards on "Towa no Mirai" (1997)
- Shinki – drums on Animetal Lady Marathon and "Yuuki no Akashi" (1998)
- Nov – vocals on "Ai o Torimodose!!" (2001)
- Mitsuo Takeuchi – vocals on "Galactic Gale Baxinger" (2001)
- Marty Friedman – lead guitar on "Wakakusa no Charlotte" (2002)

== Discography ==
- Animetal Marathon (1997)
- Animetal Marathon II (1998)
- Animetal Lady Marathon (1998)
- Animetal Marathon III (1998)
- Animetal Marathon IV (2001)
- Animetal Lady Marathon II (2002)
- Animetal Marathon V (2003)
- Animetal Marathon VI (2004)
- Animetal Marathon VII (2005)
- Decade of Bravehearts (2006)
