= Eizo Sakamoto =

Japanese musician, singer and songwriter (born 1964)

Eizo Sakamoto 坂本 英三
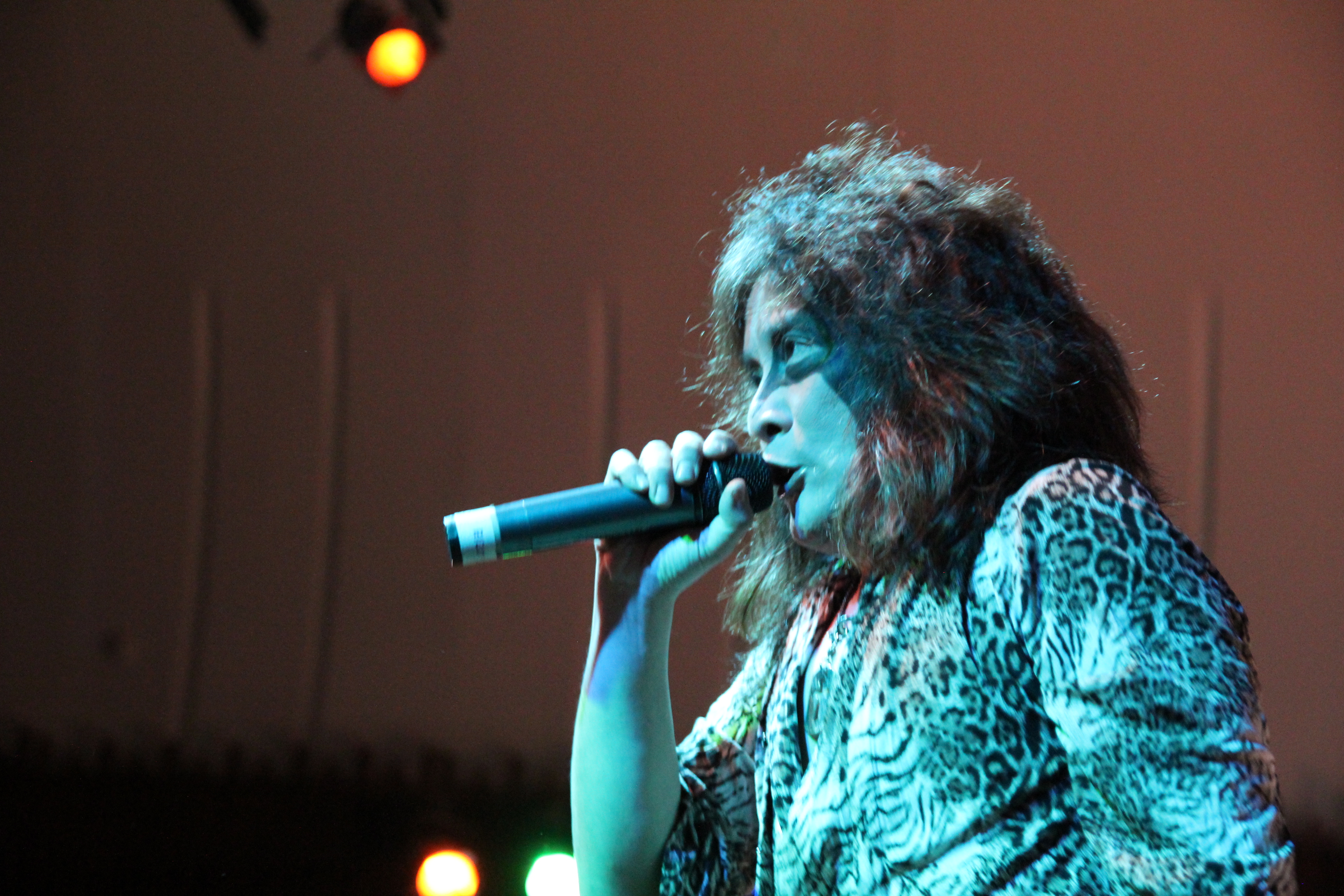
- Eizo Sakamoto at the Tokyo Impact Festival

Background information
- Also known as: さかもと えいぞう
- Born: February 23, 1964 (age 62); Nishinomiya, Hyōgo Prefecture, Japan
- Genres: Heavy metal
- Occupations: Musician, singer, songwriter
- Instruments: Vocals, guitar
- Years active: 1985-present
- Labels: Sony Music Entertainment Japan, VAP, Lantis, Avex
- Formerly of: Anthem; Animetal; JAM Project; Aisenshi
- Website: www.eizosakamoto.tokyo/

Eizo Sakamoto (坂本 英三, Sakamoto Eizō; also credited as さかもと えいぞう Sakamoto Eizō, born February 23, 1964) is a Japanese musician, singer and songwriter who was born in Nishinomiya, Hyōgo Prefecture. He is most famous for being the lead vocalist of heavy metal band Anthem. In the 1990s he started up the band Animetal which performed heavy metal covers of anime and tokusatsu opening and closing themes. He also was involved with the Anison band JAM Project before reuniting with Anthem. Sakamoto then began a new project called Eizo Japan which is similar to Animetal: more heavy metal covers of theme songs post-disbanding, along with original material.

== Discography ==
=== Albums ===
1. [2000] Metal Itchokusen (メタル一直線, Metaru Itchokusen)
2. [2002] Shout Drunker
3. [2003] Metal Handsome Man (メタルハンサムマン, Metaru Hansamu Man)
4. [2006] Metal Handsome Man 4: Forever Young (メタルハンサムマン4 FOREVER YOUNG, Metaru Hansamu Man 4 FOREVER YOUNG)
5. [2014.03.08] Heavenly Days

=== Eizo Japan ===
1. [2008.08.26] Eizo Japan 1
2. [2009.12.02] Eizo Japan 2
3. [2010.08.25] Eizo Japan 3
4. [2010.10.23] Super Animesong: Legend of 1990s (スーパーアニソン レジェンド オブ’90, Sūpā Anison Rejendo Obu '90)

=== Anthem ===
1. [1985] Anthem
2. [1985] Ready To Ride
3. [1986] Tightrope
4. [1986] Xanadu (Promotional Single For The 1985 Video Game Xanadu: Dragon Slayer II)
5. [1987] Bound To Break
6. [2001] Seven Hills
7. [2002] Overload
8. [2004] Eternal Warrior
9. [2006] Immortal
10. [2008] Black Empire
11. [2011] Heraldic Device
12. [2012] Burning Oath

=== Singles ===
1. Raibu Gōgō (雷武轟々)
  - For Kamen Rider Hibiki

=== Miscellaneous ===
1. [1998] Another Face
  - Collaboration with Bunkyo Gakudan
2. [1998] Open Your Heart
  - Demo vocals for Jun Senone for revealing Sonic Adventure at Tokyo International Forum
3. [2010] CRYING STARS - ~STAND PROUD!~
  - Guest vocals on two songs of the Syu's cover album
4. [2020] Tatakae Otaking!
  - Collaboration with The Chilean Band RageQuit
