= Into the Purgatory =

Studio album by Galneryus
- Released: 23 October 2019
- Genre: Power metal, neoclassical metal
- Length: 58:29
- Label: Warner Music Japan
- Producer: Yorimasa Hisatake

Galneryus chronology
Ultimate Sacrifice (2017)	Into the Purgatory (2019)	Union Gives Strength (2021)

Into the Purgatory is the twelfth studio album by power metal band Galneryus. It was released on 23 October 2019 via Warner Music Japan, coinciding with the 15th anniversary of their debut album The Flag of Punishment. The band described the album as "a highly free-form album that captures the band's accumulated experience over the past 15 years and the newness of their 16th year", as opposed to their usual concept albums like their previous two releases, Under the Force of Courage and Ultimate Sacrifice.

A music video was made for the song "The Followers". The band promoted the album and celebrated the 15th anniversary of their debut with the "GALNERYUS 15th Anniversary ~Radiance~ 'WAILING IN THE FLAMES OF PURGATORY' TOUR" tour that started on the day of the album's release. The setlist consisted on Into the Purgatory in its entirety followed by tracks throughout the band's history.

== Track listing ==
No.	Title	Lyrics	Music	Length
1.	"Purgatorial Flame"	instrumental	Syu	2:52
2.	"My Hope Is Gone"	Syu	Syu	7:00
3.	"Fighting of Eternity"	Sho	Yuhki	6:28
4.	"Glory"	Syu	Syu	5:49
5.	"Never Again"	Syu, Taka	Syu	7:21
6.	"The Followers"	Syu	Syu	5:09
7.	"Come Back to Me Again"	Sho	Syu	5:57
8.	"Remain Behind"	Sho	Syu	6:22
9.	"The End of the Line"	Syu	Syu	8:56
10.	"Roaming in My Memory"	instrumental	Syu	2:35

== Personnel ==
- Syu – Guitars
- Sho – Lead vocals
- Taka – Bass
- Fumiya – Drums
- Yuhki – Keyboards, Hammond organ
