= The Stars Will Light the Way =

Studio album by Galneryus
- Released: 25 September 2024
- Genres: Power metal, neoclassical metal
- Length: 64:30
- Label: Warner Music Japan
- Producer: Yorimasa Hisatake

Galneryus chronology
Between Dread and Valor (2023)	The Stars Will Light the Way (2024)	A Cry from the Sky Above (2026)

Professional ratings
Review scores
Source	Rating
The Dark Melody	8.8/10

The Stars Will Light the Way is the fifteenth studio album by power metal band Galneryus. It was released on 25 September 2024 via Warner Music Japan. Despite being the band's fifteenth album, it is alternatively considered their thirteenth album, as their previous two releases, Union Gives Strength and Between Dread and Valor, are deemed "special albums". The album's release coincides with the 20th anniversary of their debut album, The Flag of Punishment. The band released a video celebrating the anniversary, "THE RISING OF THE NEW LEGACY". A music video was made for the song "The Reason We Fight".

== Track listing ==
No.	Title	Lyrics	Music	Length
1.	"Go Towards the Utopia"	instrumental	Syu	2:37
2.	"The Reason We Fight"	Syu	Syu	7:21
3.	"Lost in the Darkness"	Sho	Syu	4:54
4.	"Finally, It Comes!"	Sho	Syu	6:00
5.	"In Water's Gaze"	Yuhki	Yuhki	8:23
6.	"Heartless"	Syu	Syu	8:02
7.	"Crying for You"	Yuhki, Sho	Yuhki	7:05
8.	"Voice in Sadness"	Sho	Syu	6:16
9.	"I Believe"	Syu	Syu	11:07
10.	"Life Will Go On"	instrumental	Syu	2:45
Total length:				64:30

== Personnel ==
- Syu – guitars
- Sho – lead vocals
- Taka – bass
- Lea – drums
- Yuhki – keyboards, Hammond organ
