= Between Dread and Valor =

Studio album by Galneryus
- Released: 1 March 2023
- Genre: Power metal, neoclassical metal, symphonic metal
- Length: 41:28
- Label: Warner Music Japan
- Producer: Syu, Yorimasa Hisatake

Galneryus chronology
Union Gives Strength (2021)	Between Dread and Valor (2023)	The Stars Will Light the Way (2024)

Professional ratings
Review scores
Source	Rating
The Dark Melody	7.7/10
NINE:32	8.5/10

Between Dread and Valor is the fourteenth studio album by power metal band Galneryus. It was released on 1 March 2023 via Warner Music Japan. It is noted to be shorter than the band's other albums, consisting of just eight tracks including five new songs, two instrumentals, and a re-recording of a song originally by vocalist Sho. One of the instrumentals, "Demolish the Wickedness" is described as "a progressive and technical instrumental", which is unlike the intro tracks for their other albums. The band promoted the album with the "STRUGGLING BETWEEN DREAD AND VALOR" tour, in which the band performed 10 shows across Japan.

== Track listing ==
No.	Title	Lyrics	Music	Length
1.	"Demolish the Wickedness!"	instrumental	Syu	1:54
2.	"Run to the Edge"	Syu	Syu	8:52
3.	"Time Will Tell"	Sho	Yuhki	5:35
4.	"Let Us Shine"	Syu	Syu	6:19
5.	"With Pride"	Sho	Syu	4:48
6.	"Bravehearts"	Syu, Taka	Syu	7:06
7.	"A Piece of Souls"	instrumental	Syu	2:07
8.	"祈 (Pray) (re-recording of a song by Sho)"	Sho	Syu	4:45
Total length:				41:28

== Personnel ==
- Syu – Guitars
- Sho – Lead vocals
- Taka – Bass
- Lea – Drums
- Yuhki – Keyboards, Hammond organ
