= Phoenix Rising (Galneryus album) =

Studio album by Galneryus
- Released: October 5, 2011
- Genre: Power metal, neoclassical metal
- Length: 1:32:28 (including Bonus CD); 58:48 (without Bonus CD)
- Label: VAP
- Producer: Yorimasa Hisatake

Galneryus chronology
Resurrection (2010)	Phoenix Rising (2011)	Angel of Salvation (2012)

Phoenix Rising is the seventh studio album by power metal band Galneryus. The album reached number 23 on the Oricon album charts and No. 21 at the Billboard Japan Top Albums.

== Track listing ==
All songs arranged by Galneryus and Yorimasa Hisatake.

Main Disc
No.	Title	Lyrics	Music	Length
1.	"The Rising"	Syu	Syu	2:08
2.	"Tear Off Your Chain"	Sho	Syu	6:47
3.	"Future Never Dies"	Syu	Syu	5:36
4.	"Spirit of Steel"	Sho	Syu	5:18
5.	"Scars"	Sho	Yuhki	5:46
6.	"The Wind Blows"	Sho	Syu	5:36
7.	"T.F.F.B."	Sho	Syu	7:09
8.	"No More Tears"	Sho	Yuhki	6:54
9.	"Bash Out!"	Sho, Taka	Syu	4:57
10.	"The Time Has Come"	Syu	Syu	5:26
11.	"The Phoenix"	(Instrumentals)	Syu	3:12

Special Bonus Live CD
No.	Title	Writer(s)	Length
1.	"Against the Wind" (Stratovarius cover)	Timo Tolkki, Timo Kotipelto	4:18
2.	"Rock You Like a Hurricane" (Scorpions cover)	Rudolf Schenker, Klaus Meine, Herman Rarebell	4:32
3.	"Secret Loser" (Ozzy Osbourne cover)	Ozzy Osbourne, Jake E. Lee, Bob Daisley	5:17
4.	"1789" (Silver Mountain cover)	Jonas Hansson	4:11
5.	"Kiss of Death" (Dokken cover)	Don Dokken, George Lynch, Jeff Pilson	5:49
6.	"Never Die" (Yngwie Malmsteen cover)	Yngwie Malmsteen	3:50
7.	"Street Lethal" (Racer X cover)	Paul Gilbert, Jeff Martin	5:45

== Personnel ==
- Syu – Guitar, Throat
- Masatoshi Ono – Vocals
- Taka – Bass
- Junichi – Drums
- Yuhki – Keyboards, Hammond organ

== Production ==
- Produced by Yorimisa Hisatake.
- A&R Directed by Kentaro Tanaka for VAP.
- Engineered by Atsushi Yamaguchi for MIT Studio.
- Mixed by Naoki Sakurai.
- Assistant Engineer: Yuichi Otsubo for MIT Studio.
- Recorded & Mixed at MIT Studio.
- Mastered by Yoichi Aikawa for Blue Mastering.
- Mastered at Blue Mastering.
