= A Cry from the Sky Above =

Studio album by Galneryus
- Released: 15 July 2026
- Genres: Power metal, neoclassical metal
- Length: 65:43
- Label: Warner Music Japan

Galneryus chronology
The Stars Will Light the Way (2024)	A Cry from the Sky Above (2026)

A Cry from the Sky Above is the sixteenth (Note: The band consider it their fourteenth studio album, excluding their COVID-era "special" albums.) studio album by power metal band Galneryus. It was released on 15 July 2026 via Warner Music Japan. According to the band, the album consists of "melodic hard rock tracks," as well as "two full-length songs and a ballad after a long time!"

A music video for "The Light of Hope" was released a week prior, on 8 July 2026. Guitarist Syu stated about the song, "What's interesting is that in the previous album, the opening was a bright, melodic song in a major key, but then it transitioned into the angry-sounding 'THE REASON WE FIGHT.' This time, we reversed that approach, starting with an angry, melancholic melody, and just when you think it's going to continue with a thrashy, melancholic riff, it turns out to be something sparkly. It starts with an element of surprise."

While A Cry from the Sky Above is not a concept album, its theme is centered around the songs "The Light of Hope" and "Without You", the latter surpassing the title track of their 2012 album Angel of Salvation as the band's longest song, with a length of over 15 minutes.

== Track listing ==
No.	Title	Length
1.	"Call of the Horizon" (instrumental)	3:05
2.	"The Light of Hope"	8:54
3.	"Let No Time Decay"	6:41
4.	"Beyond the Sunrise"	6:23
5.	"Break the Silence!"	8:02
6.	"To the Last Breath"	5:28
7.	"Echoes of Fate"	7:35
8.	"Without You"	15:07
9.	"Where You Were" (instrumental)	4:28
Total length:		65:43

== Personnel ==
- Sho – lead vocals
- Syu – guitars
- Taka – bass
- Yuhki – keyboards, Hammond organ
- Lea – drums

== Charts ==
Chart performance for A Cry from the Sky Above
Chart (2026)	Peak position
Japanese Albums (Oricon)	24
