= Vetelgyus =

Studio album by Galneryus
- Released: September 24, 2014
- Genre: Power metal, neoclassical metal
- Length: 1:11:24
- Label: VAP
- Producer: Yorimasa Hisatake

Galneryus chronology
Angel of Salvation (2012)	Vetelgyus (2014)	Under the Force of Courage (2015)

Vetelgyus is the ninth studio album by power metal/neo-classical metal band Galneryus. The track "Attitude to Life" was used as the ending theme for the anime television series Laughing Under the Clouds.

== Track listing ==
All songs arranged by Galneryus and Yorimasa Hisatake.

No.	Title	Lyrics	Music	Length
1.	"Redstar Rising"	(Instrumentals)	Syu	1:30
2.	"Endless Story"	Syu	Syu	6:13
3.	"There's No Escape"	Sho	Syu	5:19
4.	"Ultimatum"	Sho	Syu	5:29
5.	"Enemy to Injustice"	Sho, Taka	Yuhki	7:20
6.	"The Judgement Day (Vetelgyus mix)"	Syu	Syu	7:42
7.	"Vetelgyus"	(Instrumentals)	Syu	8:06
8.	"Attitude to Life"	Sho	Syu	5:59
9.	"Secret Love"	Sho	Yuhki	6:58
10.	"The Guide"	Taka	Syu	5:14
11.	"I Wish"	Syu	Syu	6:29
12.	"The Voyage"	(Instrumentals)	Syu	4:58

- Track 2 was rerecorded in Syu's 2016 solo album You Play Hard as an instrumental

== Personnel ==
- Syu – Guitar
- Sho – Vocals
- Taka – Bass
- Junichi – Drums
- Yuhki – Keyboards, Hammond organ

=== Additional credits ===
- Yasuyuki "Buddy" Hirahara – (Instrumental Technician)
- Hitomi Orima – (Female Vocals on Tr. 5, 7, 10)
- Syu, Sho, Yuhki, Yorimasa Hisatake – (Additional Chorus)
- Yutaka Kuwase (LOGGIA) – (Art Direction and Design)
- Shinya Omachi – (Photographer)

== Chart performance ==
The album reached No. 16 and No. 18 on the Billboard Japan Top Albums and Oricon album charts, respectively; the second highest rankings of their studio albums.
