= Yoshitaka Amano =

Japanese artist, character designer, and illustrator (born 1952)

- 天野 喜孝
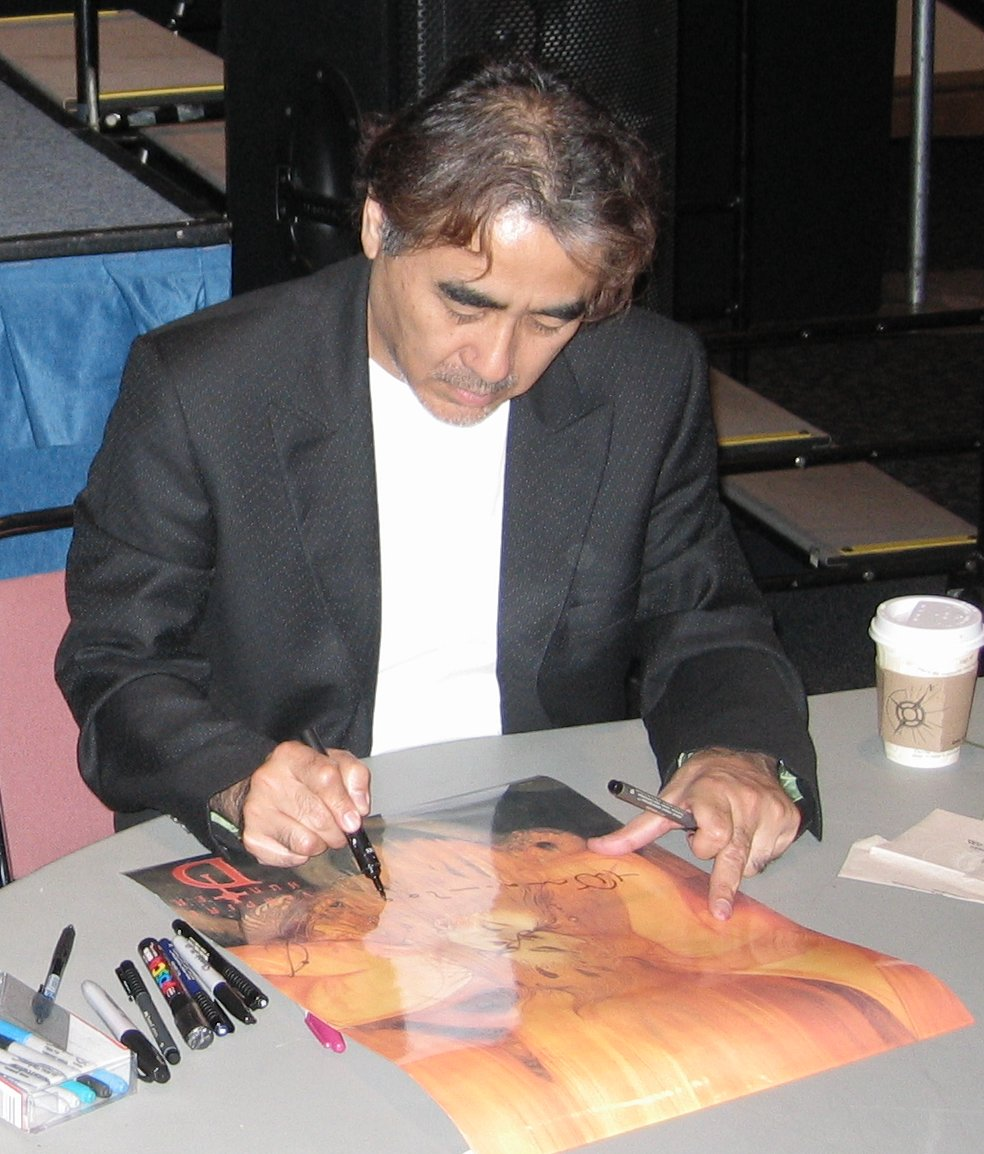
- Amano in 2006
- Born: March 26, 1952 (age 74); Shizuoka, Shizuoka Prefecture, Japan
- Years active: 1967–present
- Known for: character design, illustration, printmaking, painting, sculpting
- Notable work: Final Fantasy, Vampire Hunter D, Speed Racer, Gatchaman, Casshan, Guin Saga
- Awards: Seiun Award; Dragon Con Award; Julie Award; Inkpot Award, 2018; Artist Guest of Honor, Worldcon 65 (Nippon 2007)

Yoshitaka Amano (天野 喜孝, Amano Yoshitaka; born March 26, 1952) is a Japanese visual artist, character designer, illustrator, scenic designer for theatre and film, and costume designer. He began his career in 1967 at Tatsunoko Production, working on anime such as Speed Racer, and later created characters for anime like Gatchaman, Tekkaman, Honeybee Hutch, and Casshern. In 1982, he went independent and became a freelance artist, finding success as an illustrator for numerous authors and working on best-selling novel series, like The Guin Saga and Vampire Hunter D. He is also known for his commissioned illustrations for the Final Fantasy video game franchise.

Since the 1990s, Amano has created and exhibited paintings in galleries around the world, primarily using acrylic and automotive paint on aluminium box panels to depict his iconic retro pop icons. He is a five-time winner of the Seiun Award, and also won the 1999 Bram Stoker Award for The Sandman: The Dream Hunters, a collaboration with Neil Gaiman.

Amano's influences include early Western comic books, Orientalism, Art Nouveau, and Japanese woodblock prints. In early 2010, he established Studio Devaloka, a film production company.

Amano's design work for early anime series such as Gatchaman drew inspiration from Western comic books.

== Biography ==
Amano was born in Shizuoka, Shizuoka Prefecture, Japan, to Yoshio (1917–1962) and Kesano (née Fujimoto) Amano. He is the youngest child of four. Amano's father was a lacquer artist, specializing in traditional Suruga lacquerware. As a young adolescent, Yoshitaka Amano was fascinated with drawing. In 1967, he began working in the animation department of Tatsunoko Productions, where he was introduced to the early Japanese anime movement. His first paid project was for the Speed Racer anime franchise. He was a character designer for anime shows such as Time Bokan, Gatchaman, Tekkaman, and Honeybee Hutch.

In the 1960s, Amano was exposed to Western art styles through comic books, which he claims among his artistic roots. He has cited Neal Adams as his favorite comic book artist, noting that he would often purchase used comics based on Adams's cover artwork, only to be disappointed that the interior artist was different. Amano was also fascinated by the art styles of psychedelic art and pop art of the West, particularly the work of American Pop artist Peter Max. In the 1970s, Amano studied the artworks of the late 19th century and early 20th century European movement of Art Nouveau, as well as the Russian orientalists (Leon Bakst, Ivan Bilibin) and the ancient Japanese hand woodblock printing work of Ukiyo-e. Amano remained at Tatsunoko Productions until 1982.

=== Early fantasy works ===
During the 1980s, Amano concentrated on illustrations for science fiction and fantasy works. Combined with the influence of his prior experience in animation, this focus resulted in a personal style influenced by both modern surrealism and realism.

He left Tatsunoko Production and started his activities as a freelancer in 1982. He did illustration and cover page design of Kimaira series, written by Baku Yumemakura, from this year. In 1983, he illustrated the novel Demon City Shinjuku and the first in Hideyuki Kikuchi's Vampire Hunter D novel series. He also worked as a character designer on the 1985 movie adaptation of Vampire Hunter D, which was one of the first anime movies to be released outside Japan. In interviews, however, Amano has stated that he was not pleased with the final product of the movie.

His illustrations begin to be published in collections such as Maten in 1984. That year he drew the manga Amon Saga, written by Baku Yumemakura, which was later adapted into an OVA.

=== Video games ===
Amano's work on the Final Fantasy series, as with his science fiction and fantasy illustrations, is known for its wispy lines and vibrant use of color.

In 1987, Amano joined Square (now known as Square Enix) to work on a role-playing video game for the Nintendo Entertainment System: Final Fantasy. Amano produced conceptual design pieces for the game in both traditional and computer designed artwork. At this time, he also worked for another video game company, Kure Software Koubou, producing box cover illustrations as well as some character designs. This work included designs for Kure's First Queen series. Following Final Fantasy VI in 1994, he stepped down as the conceptual, image, and graphic designer of the series. As of 2025, he continues to provide promotional and character artwork for the following games and to design their title logos.

Amano became the world's highest-earning artist in 1996, earning $40,000,000 (equivalent to $82,000,000 in 2025) that year from sales of silk screens, lithographs and etchings based on his book illustrations. His work began receiving international recognition following the release of Final Fantasy VII in 1997. In 2006, Hironobu Sakaguchi, the former designer and creator of the Final Fantasy series, recruited Amano and composer Nobuo Uematsu to work on video games at Mistwalker.

Amano and Uematsu worked together again on such video games as Fairy Fencer F at Compile Heart.

=== Branching out ===
Amano's first exhibition, called "Hiten", was held in 1989 at Yurakucho Mullion in Tokyo, Japan. In 1990, he began to work as an artist and set designer for stage theater. His first work for theater was Tamasaburo Bando's Nayotake.

Beginning in 1995 with his work at the Biennale d'Orléans in France, he received increased recognition outside Japan. Further international exhibitions followed, including the 1999 "Hero" at the Angel Orensanz Foundation and the 1997 workshop and exhibition "Think Like Amano". In the 2020s, his work was exhibited at Lomex Gallery in New York and The Warehouse in Dallas.

In 1998, Amano appeared as Hiroshi in the movie New Rose Hotel, loosely based on the William Gibson short story of the same name.

=== Freelancing ===
In 2000, Amano illustrated Neil Gaiman's The Sandman: The Dream Hunters, which won several awards and was nominated for a Hugo Award. In 2001, Greg Rucka and Amano collaborated on another comic book tale, Elektra and Wolverine: The Redeemer. His character designs were used in another Vampire Hunter D movie entitled Vampire Hunter D: Bloodlust. In 2006, the first volume of his HERO series was released by Boom! Studios. He was key visual and costume designer for movies written by Baku Yumemakura, including Onmyoji, Onmyoji 2, and Taitei no Ken.

He illustrated three album covers for the Japanese power metal band Galneryus: The Flag of Punishment (2003), Advance to the Fall (2005), and Beyond the End of Despair (2006).

In 2004 Amano was asked by creative director GK Reid to create illustrations in collaboration with author Neil Gaiman and featuring David Bowie and Iman as sci-fi characters, for "The Return of the Thin White Duke" a portion of which were published in V Magazine.

In 2008, Amano created an illustrated adaptation of Wolfgang Amadeus Mozart's The Magic Flute, published by Radical Comics. He also collaborated with Christopher "mink" Morrison of Quentin Tarantino's A Band Apart production company, providing illustrations for the novel Shinjuku and Shinjuku Azul, as well as a third unannounced follow up and an online game, Shinjuku Nexus. He was the character designer for the 2009 Jungle Emperor (Kimba the White Lion) TV special, directed by Gorō Taniguchi, to commemorate both the 50th anniversary of Fuji Television and the 80th anniversary of Osamu Tezuka's birth.

He illustrated the cover art of the 2026 2hollis album Pirouette.

=== Studio Devaloka ===
In 2010, following a small solo art exhibition tour titled "Devaloka" it was announced that Amano had established a film production company, Studio Devaloka, and would be directing a 3D anime titled Zan, with additional projects to be announced in the future. On December 15, 2010, the official website for the film, now titled Deva Zan, was unveiled, along with information concerning an upcoming press conference, to be held on December 21, 2010. The roughly ten-minute-long conference revealed details about the project, including staff, as well as a short trailer for the film, which stylistically emulates the look of Amano's paintings.

In April 2012, an illustrated novel adaptation of the work was announced by Dark Horse Manga. To be released in January 2013, the novel will be Amano's debut as an author and will include over 240 original illustrations. Despite a projected 2012 release date, Amano stated in an October 2012 interview that the animation project was still in its development and funding stages and may instead be realized as a TV series. The possibility of a video game adaptation was also mentioned.

In 2013, Amano collaborated with Japanese rock star Hyde (L'Arc-en-Ciel/VAMPS) on an art exhibition titled Destiny and Decay: Nippon Evolution.

On July 2, 2023, Amano appeared at Anime Expo to reveal the cover art for the classical single "Requiem" by rock artist Yoshiki.

== List of works ==
=== Animation ===
- Science Ninja Team Gatchaman (1972)
- Casshan (1973)
- Hurricane Polymar (1974)
- New Honeybee Hutch (1974)
- Time Bokan (1975)
  - Yatterman (1977)
  - Zenderman (1979)
  - Rescueman (1980)
  - Yattodetaman (1981)
  - Gyakuten! Ippatsuman (1982)
  - Itadakiman (1983)
- Tekkaman: The Space Knight (1975)
- Gowappa 5 Gōdam (1976)
- Akū Daisakusen Srungle (1983)
- Genesis Climber MOSPEADA (1983)
- Radio City Fantasy
- Starzan S (1984)
- Bismark (1984)
- Angel's Egg (also co-creator of the story) (1985)
- Vampire Hunter D (1985)
- Amon Saga (1986)
- Lily C.A.T. (1987)
- 1001 Nights (1998, concert video directed by Mike Smith for music by David Newman, based on Amano's Princess Budou illustrations)
- Ayakashi (2006)
- Fantascope ~Tylostoma~(2006)
- Bird's Song (2007)
- Ten Nights of Dreams (2007)
- Vegetable Fairies: N.Y. Salad (2007)
- Jungle Taitei: Yūki ga Mirai wo Kaeru (2009)
- Gibiate (2020)
- Exception (2022)
- Zan (2026)

=== Novels ===
- A Wind Named Amnesia English Version (2009)

==== Author ====
- DEVA ZAN (2013)

==== Illustrator ====
Select domestic Japanese works

- Vampire Hunter D (1983–ongoing)
- Guin Saga (1984–1997)
- The Heroic Legend of Arslan (1986–1999)
- Sohryuden (1987–ongoing)
- Rampo Edogawa Mystery Collection (1987–1989)
- Tekiha Kaizoku Series
- Shinsetsu Taikō-ki
- Chimera Kō (1982–2002)
- Garouden
- The Tale of Genji (1997)
- Sword World RPG – Assorted artwork
- Bye Bye, Earth (2000)
- Mateki: The Magic Flute
- Illustrated Blues (2010)

Select Japanese editions of foreign works

- The Book of the New Sun (1980-1983)
- A Cup of Magic! (1981)
- The Prince in the Scarlet Robe, Corum (1982)
- Erekosë Saga (1983)
- Elric Saga (1984)
- Dream Weaver (1985)
- The Chronicles of Castle Brass (1988)
- Hoka Series
- Seven Brothers (2006)

Foreign works

- Sandman: The Dream Hunters (1999)
- Elektra and Wolverine: The Redeemer (2002)
- Yoshitaka Amano's HERO (2006–ongoing)
- Shinjuku (2010)
- Shinjuku Azul (TBA)

=== Art books ===
- Maten / Evil Universe (1984)
- Genmukyu / Castle of Illusions (1986) (ISBN 4-403-01029-6)
- Imagine (1987) (ISBN 4-403-01031-8)
- Hiten / Flying Universe: The Art of Yoshitaka Amano (1989) (ISBN 4-257-03229-4
- Dawn (1991) (ISBN 4-87188-135-0
- The Heroic Tales Of Arslan (1991)
- The Illustrations for Tarot Card by Yoshitaka Amano (1992) (ISBN 4-87519-401-3
- Rasenoh / Spiral King (1992) (ISBN 4-19-414749-9)
- Le Roi de la Lune (1992) (ISBN 4-8164-1224-7)
- Mono (1993)
- Untitled set of 10 postcards (1993)
- Steps To Heaven (1993)
- Yoshitaka Amano Postcard Selection (1994) (ISBN 4-87188-800-2)
- 'Japan, Final Fantasy (1994) (ISBN 4-87188-338-8)
- Katen (1994) (ISBN 4-06-206858-3)
- Budōhime / Princess Budou (1996)
- Yousei / Fairies (1996) (ISBN 1-59582-062-0)
- Guin Saga (1996) (ISBN 4-15-207984-3)
- Yoshitaka Amano: Collection of Paintings (1996)
- 1996 (1996)
- Kan'oke / Coffin (1997) (ISBN 1-59582-061-2)
- Think Like Amano (1997)
- Biten (1999)
- Alice Erotica (1999)
- 1001 Nights (1999)
- Märchen (2000)
- Vampire Hunter D (2000) (ISBN 4-257-03606-0)
- POEM (2001)
- Kotatsu I (2002)
- Kotatsu II (2002)
- Guin Saga Chronicle (2002)
- The Sky (2002)
- Kiten (2002)
- Symphony' (2002)
- Amano First (2003) (ISBN 4-257-03683-4)
- The Virgin (2004) (ISBN 4-89452-846-0)
- Yoshitaka Amano x HYDE – Destiny and Decay: Nippon Evolution (2013)
- Yoshitaka Amano Exhibition Art Book: The World Beyond Your Imagination (2015)

=== Video games ===
- Esh's Aurunmilla (1984) – character designer
- Final Fantasy (1987) – character designer, title logo designer and graphic designer
- Final Fantasy II (1988) – character designer, title logo designer and graphic designer
- First Queen (1988) – box cover artist
- Duel (1989) – box cover artist
- Duel98 (1989) – box cover artist
- Final Fantasy III (1990) – character designer & title logo designer
- First Queen 2 (1990) – box cover artist
- Final Fantasy IV (1991) – character designer, image designer and title logo designer
- Final Fantasy V (1992) – character designer, image designer and title logo designer
- Kawanakajima Ibunroku (1992) – box cover artist
- First Queen 3 (1993) – box cover artist
- Final Fantasy VI (1994) – character designer, image designer and title logo designer
- Front Mission (1995) – character designer
- Front Mission: Gun Hazard (1996) – character designer
- Final Fantasy VII (1997) – promotional artwork, image illustrator, title logo designer and character artwork
- Final Fantasy Tactics (1997) – promotional artwork, image illustrator, title logo designer and character artwork
- Kartia: The Word of Fate (1998) – art designer
- Final Fantasy VIII (1999) – promotional artwork, image illustrator, title logo designer and character artwork
- Final Fantasy IX (2000) – character illustrations & original character designer
- El Dorado Gate (2000–2001) – creative director & additional design
- Final Fantasy X (2001) – promotional artwork, Image Illustrations, title logo designer and character artwork
- Final Fantasy X-2 (2003) – promotional artwork, title logo designer and image illustrator
- Final Fantasy XI (2002) – promotional artwork, title logo designer and image illustrator
- Final Fantasy XII (2006) – promotional artwork, title logo designer and image illustrator
- Lord of Vermilion (2008) – guest card illustrator
- Dissidia Final Fantasy (2008) – title logo designer & image illustrator
- Final Fantasy IV: The After Years (2009) – title logo designer
- Lord of Vermilion II (2009) – guest card illustrator
- Final Fantasy XIII (2010) – promotional artwork, title logo designer & image illustrator
- Final Fantasy XIV (2010) – title logo designer
- Lord of Arcana (2010) – guest monster designer
- Dissidia 012 Final Fantasy (2011) – title logo designer & image illustrator
- Final Fantasy Type-0 (2011) – promotional artwork, title logo designer & image illustrator
- Final Fantasy XIII-2 (2011) – title logo designer
- Final Fantasy Dimensions (2012) – title logo designer
- UnchainBlades EXXiV (2012) – character designer
- Fantasy Life (2012) – image illustrator
- Fairy Fencer F (2013) – art designer
- Child of Light (2014) – image illustrator
- Terra Battle (2014) – character designer
- Final Fantasy Explorers (2014) – title logo designer
- Mobius Final Fantasy (2015) – title logo designer
- Final Fantasy Grandmasters (2015) – title logo designer
- Final Fantasy: Brave Exvius (2015) – promotional artwork, title logo designer
- World of Final Fantasy (2016) – title logo designer
- Final Fantasy XV (2016) – promotional artwork, title logo designer & image illustrator
- Final Fantasy Dimensions II (2017) – title logo designer
- World of Final Fantasy: Meli-Melo (2017) – title logo designer
- Dissidia Final Fantasy NT (2018) – title logo designer
- Final Fantasy Explorers-Force (2018) – title logo designer
- Arc of Alchemist (2019) – image illustrator
- Eternal (2019) – key visual, character designer, Monster Designer
- War of the Visions: Final Fantasy Brave Exvius (2019) – title logo designer
- Final Fantasy VII Remake (2020) - title logo designer
- Stranger of Paradise: Final Fantasy Origin (2022) – title logo designer
- Front Mission 1st: Remake (2022) – character designer
- Eternal Kingdom Battle Peak (2022) - character designer
- Final Fantasy XVI (2023) – title logo designer
- Fortnite – Amano's Heart collaboration (2023) – character designer & image illustrator
- Gex Trilogy (2025) – 'Tail Time Edition' box cover artist

=== Music ===
- Raphael: Sweet Romance (1999), Yume Yori Suteki na (1999), Hanasaku Inochi Aru Kagiri (1999), Eternal Wish (Todokanu Kimi e) (1999), Promise (1999) – Cover Illustrator
- Galneryus: The Flag of Punishment (2003), Advance to the Fall (2005), Beyond the End of Despair... (2006), Best of the Awakening Days (2009), Best of the Braving Days (2009) – Cover Illustrator
- Vocaloid 3 Library: Zola Project (2013) – image illustrator
- Random Encounter: Lost Frequency (2017) – cover and interior illustrator
- Tainy: Monstruo (2025), Única (2026), Rosita (2026) - image illustrator
- 2hollis: Pirouette (2026) - image illustrator

=== Other works ===
- Magic: The Gathering Liliana, Dreadhorde General (2019) – image illustrator
- Vogue Italia January issue (2020) – Cover and editorial illustrator
- Magic: The Gathering (2025) - image illustrator for multiple cards of the Final Fantasy UB set
