= Angel of Salvation =

Studio album by Galneryus
- Released: October 10, 2012
- Genres: Power metal, neoclassical metal
- Length: 1:04:55
- Label: VAP
- Producer: Yorimasa Hisatake

Galneryus chronology
Phoenix Rising (2011)	Angel of Salvation (2012)	Vetelgyus (2014)

Angel of Salvation is the eighth studio album by the Japanese power metal/neo-classical metal band Galneryus, released on October 10, 2012. The 10-song album featured two songs from the single "Hunting For Your Dream": the titular song and "Temptation Through the Night", the latter which was featured as a "work in progress" version. The title track "Angel of Salvation", which interpolates "Violin Concerto in D major, Op. 35" by Pyotr Ilyich Tchaikovsky, was Galneryus' longest song to date at 14 minutes and 42 seconds long, until it was surpassed by the 15-minute "Without You" from their 2026 album A Cry from the Sky Above. A music video was released for the title track, albeit shortened to half its length. The song is also the first to feature a guest vocalist in a studio album by Galneryus in Akane Liv from the band LIV MOON. For the album and tour, Syu switched from a Hughes and Kettner amplifier to a Diezel Hagen amplifier and cabinet. This was also shown in the "Angel of Salvation" music video. Syu reverted to his ESP Crying Star Rebel signature guitar for the "Under the Promised Flag Tour" with modifications to the humbuckers. "Hunting for Your Dream" was used as the second closing theme for the new Hunter × Hunter anime adaptation. The album cover shows an image of the statue of Archangel Michael by August Vogel located in St. Michael's Church in Hamburg.

== Track listing ==
All songs arranged by Galneryus and Yorimasa Hisatake.

No.	Title	Lyrics	Music	Length
1.	"Reach to the Sky"	Syu, Taka	Syu	2:30
2.	"The Promised Flag"	Syu	Syu	6:19
3.	"Temptation Through the Night"	Sho	Yuhki	6:12
4.	"Lonely as a Stranger"	Sho	Syu	5:53
5.	"Stand up for the Right"	Sho, Taka	Syu	6:56
6.	"Hunting for Your Dream"	Sho	Syu	5:24
7.	"Lament"	Sho	Syu	5:14
8.	"Infinity"	Sho	Syu	6:20
9.	"Angel of Salvation"	Syu	Syu	14:42
10.	"Longing"	(Instrumental)	Syu	4:54

== Credits ==
- Syu - Guitar
- Masatoshi Ono "Sho" - (Vocals)
- Taka - (Bass)
- Yuhki - (Keyboards, Hammond Organ)
- Junichi Satoh - (Drums)

=== Additional credits ===
- Yasuyuki "Buddy" Hirahara - (Instrumental Technician)
- AKANE LIV (LIV MOON) - (Female Vocals on Tr. 9)
- Syu, Sho, Yuhki, Yorimasa Hisatake - (Additional Chorus)
- Yutaka Kuwase (LOGGIA) - (Art Direction and Design)
- Shinya Omachi - (Photographer)

== Chart performance ==
The album reached #15 and #17 on the Billboard Japan Top Albums and Oricon album charts, respectively; the highest of any of their studio albums.
