= One for All – All for One =

Studio album by Galneryus
- Released: August 22, 2007
- Genre: Power metal
- Label: VAP
- Producer: Yorimasa Hisatake

Galneryus chronology
| Beyond the End of Despair... (2006) | One for All – All for One (2007) | Reincarnation (2008) |

One for All – All for One is the fourth studio album by the Japanese power metal band Galneryus. It was released on August 22, 2007. The single "Everlasting" from this album was used as the opening theme for the TV music programme Music BB broadcast on MXTV and other network stations.

== Track listing ==
| No. | Title | Lyrics | Music | Length |
|---|---|---|---|---|
| 1. | "Red Horizon" | (Instrumental) | Syu | 2:12 |
| 2. | "New Legend" | Yama-B | Syu | 5:23 |
| 3. | "The Night Craver" | Yama-B | Yu-To | 5:07 |
| 4. | "Aim at the Top" | Yama-B | Junichi | 4:44 |
| 5. | "Everlasting (Album version)" | Yama-B, Syu | Syu | 5:02 |
| 6. | "Last New Song" | Yama-B | Syu | 5:23 |
| 7. | "Don't Touch" | Yama-B | Syu | 6:00 |
| 8. | "The Flame" | Yama-B | Yama-B | 5:03 |
| 9. | "Chasing the Wind" | Yama-B | Syu | 6:23 |
| 10. | "Sign of Revolution" | Yama-B | Yuhki | 5:35 |
| 11. | "Cry for the Dark" | Yama-B | Syu | 5:33 |
| 12. | "The Sun Goes Down" | (Instrumental) | Syu | 1:52 |

== Credits ==
- Syu: Guitar, throat
- Yama-B: Vocal
- Yu-To: Bass
- Junichi: Drums
- Yukhi: Keyboards, Hammond organ

== Chart performance ==
The album reached number 53 on the Oricon albums chart.
