= Under the Force of Courage =

Studio album by Galneryus
- Released: December 9, 2015
- Genres: Power metal, neoclassical metal, progressive metal
- Length: 1:04:18
- Label: VAP
- Producer: Yorimasa Hisatake

Galneryus chronology
Vetelgyus (2014)	Under the Force of Courage (2015)	Ultimate Sacrifice (2017)

Under the Force of Courage is the tenth studio album by power metal/neo-classical metal band Galneryus. It is their last album to feature original drummer Jun-ichi.

== Reception ==
The album is noted for its strong progressive metal direction, a departure from the band's traditional power metal sound. This band is unique for building upon new styles and ideas, with each album "featuring its own signature style that is used to portray the desired sonic aesthetic of the subgenre."

To expand upon the song "Rain of Tears", there is a chart famous in the subject of emotion classification that many use as well in musical analysis called the "Circumplex Model", which was created by James Russel. This model uses valence and arousal dimensions, providing a valuable framework for understanding the emotional depths conveyed through musical compositions. For instance, in musical analysis, "Heavy Metal and Hip Hop will characteristically evoke negative valence, high arousal emotions."

== Track listing ==
All songs arranged by Galneryus and Yorimasa Hisatake.

No.	Title	Lyrics	Music	Length
1.	"Premonition"	Syu, Taka	Syu	3:40
2.	"The Time Before Dawn"	(Instrumentals)	Syu	2:58
3.	"Raise My Sword"	Syu	Syu	7:11
4.	"The Voice of Grievous Cry"	Sho, Syu, Taka	Syu	6:18
5.	"Rain of Tears": "I. Reminiscence"; "II. Rain of Tears"; "III. Nightmare"; "IV. Endless Confliction"; "V. Rain of Tears (Reprise)""	Taka, Yuhki	Yuhki	8:22
6.	"Reward for Betrayal"	Syu, Taka, Yuhki	Syu	7:08
7.	"Soul of the Field"	Sho, Syu	Yuhki	7:26
8.	"Chain of Distress"	Syu	Syu	6:53
9.	"The Force of Courage": "I. The Sense of My Life"; "II. Dream and Reality"; "III. Just for the Faith"; "IV. Pray to the Sky""	Syu	Syu	14:21

- Track 8 was rerecorded in Syu's 2016 solo album You Play Hard as an instrumental

== Personnel ==
- Syu - guitar
- Sho - vocals
- Taka - bass
- Junichi - drums
- Yuhki - keyboards, Hammond organ
