= Double Dealing =

Double Dealing may refer to:

- Double Dealing (1923 film), an American comedy film starring Hoot Gibson
- Double Dealing (1932 film), a British film starring Frank Pettingell

== See also ==
- Double Deal (disambiguation)
- Cheating in poker
- Double Dealer (disambiguation)
