= Ultimate Sacrifice (disambiguation) =

Ultimate Sacrifice is a 2017 album by the power metal band Galneryus.

Ultimate Sacrifice may also refer to:

- Ultimate Sacrifice: John and Robert Kennedy, the Plan for a Coup in Cuba, and the Murder of JFK, a 2005 book by Lamar Waldron with Thom Hartmann
- "The Ultimate Sacrifice" (Ben 10: Ultimate Alien), a 2011 episode of the American animated television series
