= Double Dealer (disambiguation) =

Double Dealer is a Japanese hard rock/heavy metal band.

Double Dealer may also refer to:

- Double Dealer (film), Australian film 1975
- Doubledealer (Transformers), a character from the Transformers series
- The Double Dealer, a 1694 play by William Congreve
- The Double Dealer (magazine), a 1920s literary magazine
- "Double Dealers", an episode of Onedin Line
- The Double Dealer, a short story by David Liss in Thriller

== See also ==
- Cheating at poker
- "Lady Double Dealer", a song by Deep Purple from Stormbringer
- "Lady Double Dealer", a song by Krokus from Metal Rendez-vous
- Double dealing (disambiguation)
