= Ultimate Sacrifice =

Studio album by Galneryus
- Released: 27 September 2017
- Genre: Power metal, neoclassical metal, symphonic metal
- Length: 65:13
- Label: Warner Music Japan
- Producer: Yorimasa Hisatake

Galneryus chronology
Under the Force of Courage (2015)	Ultimate Sacrifice (2017)	Into the Purgatory (2019)

Ultimate Sacrifice is the eleventh studio album by power metal band Galneryus. It is their first album to feature drummer Fumiya, as well as their first under their new label Warner Music Japan. It was released on 27 September 2017.

It is a concept album that is a sequel to the band's previous album Under the Force of Courage. A music video was made for the album's 12-minute title track, albeit cut to just half of the song. The band promoted the album with the "JUST PRAY TO THE SKY Chapter II" tour that was documented in the live album JUST PLAY TO THE SKY ~WHAT COULD WE DO FOR YOU...?~.

In 2018, readers and professional musicians voted Ultimate Sacrifice the tenth best album in the history of hard rock and heavy metal in We Rock magazine's "Metal General Election".

== Track listing ==
No.	Title	Lyrics	Music	Length
1.	"Enter the New Age"	Syu	Syu	3:00
2.	"Heavenly Punishment"	Syu	Syu	5:56
3.	"Wings of Justice"	Syu	Syu	5:49
4.	"The Shadow Within"	Syu	Syu	5:46
5.	"With Sympathy"	Taka, Sho	Yuhki	6:09
6.	"Wherever You Are"	Syu, Taka, Sho	Syu	6:35
7.	"Rising Infuriation"	Taka, Sho	Yuhki	8:07
8.	"Brutal Spiral of Emotions": "I. Blinded by Anger"; "II. Burning Within"; "III. Soul Carried by the Wind""	Syu	Syu	11:28
9.	"Ultimate Sacrifice": "I. Wishing to Liberate"; "II. The Battle in Desperation"; "III. The Reality in the End"; "IV. Phantasmagoria"; "V. The Living and the Dead"	Syu	Syu	12:23

== Personnel ==
- Syu – Guitars
- Sho – Lead vocals
- Taka – Bass
- Fumiya – Drums
- Yuhki – Keyboards, Hammond organ
