= Union Gives Strength =

Studio album by Galneryus
- Released: 16 June 2021
- Genre: Power metal, neoclassical metal
- Length: 58:38
- Label: Warner Music Japan
- Producer: Syu, Yorimasa Hisatake

Galneryus chronology
| Into the Purgatory (2019) | Union Gives Strength (2021) | Between Dread and Valor (2023) |

Union Gives Strength is the thirteenth studio album by power metal band Galneryus. It was released on 16 June 2021 via Warner Music Japan. It is their first album with new drummer Lea. The album's theme is centered around the COVID-19 pandemic.

A music video was made for the song "Whatever It Takes (Raise Our Hands!)". The opening track "The Howling Darkness" follows a different stylistic approach of death metal vocals and blast beats, inspired by Arch Enemy and In Flames. The band promoted the album with the "FIND THE WAY TO OVERCOME TOUR 2021", in which the band performed 10 shows across Japan despite the pandemic.

== Track listing ==
| No. | Title | Length |
|---|---|---|
| 1. | "The Howling Darkness" | 9:28 |
| 2. | "Flames of Rage" | 9:00 |
| 3. | "Hold On" | 6:21 |
| 4. | "Bleeding Sanity" | 5:09 |
| 5. | "See the Light of Freedom" | 7:22 |
| 6. | "Whatever It Takes (Raise Our Hands!)" | 8:48 |
| 7. | "Deep Affection (2021 Re-Recorded Version)" | 7:17 |
| 8. | "Everlasting (2021 Re-Recorded Version)" | 5:13 |

== Personnel ==
- Syu – Guitars
- Sho – Lead vocals
- Taka – Bass
- Lea – Drums
- Yuhki – Keyboards, Hammond organ
