= Resurrection (Galneryus album) =

Studio album by Galneryus
- Released: June 23, 2010
- Genre: Power metal, neoclassical metal
- Length: 57:54
- Label: VAP
- Producer: Yorimasa Hisatake

Galneryus chronology
Reincarnation (2008)	Resurrection (2010)	Phoenix Rising (2011)

Resurrection is the sixth studio album by the Japanese power metal band Galneryus, released on June 23, 2010. It is the first album to feature Galneryus' new singer Masatoshi "Sho" Ono, and new bassist Taka, after the departure of Yama-B (vocals) and Yu-To (bass). The track "A Far-Off Distance" was used as the ending theme for the anime television series Rainbow: Nisha Rokubō no Shichinin. "Emotions" was named the 73rd best guitar instrumental by Young Guitar Magazine in 2019.

== Track listing ==
All songs arranged by Galneryus and Yorimasa Hisatake.

All lyrics are written by Sho, except "United Blood", "Emotions" and "The Road Goes On" (instrumentals) and "Destinations", co-written with Taka; all music is composed by Syu, except where noted.

No.	Title	Length
1.	"United Blood"	1:48
2.	"Burn My Heart"	6:50
3.	"Carry On"	5:00
4.	"Destinations"	6:08
5.	"Still Loving You" (Yuhki)	4:40
6.	"Emotions" (Yuhki, Syu)	6:07
7.	"Save You!" (Yuhki)	7:27
8.	"A Far-Off Distance (Album version)"	4:53
9.	"Fall in the Dark"	5:07
10.	"Destiny (Album version)"	7:44
11.	"The Road Goes On"	2:05

== Personnel ==
- Masatoshi Ono - Vocals
- Syu - Lead and rhythm guitars, backing vocals
- Taka - Bass
- Yuhki - Keyboards
- Junichi Satoh - Drums

== Chart performance ==
The album reached number 35 on the Oricon album charts and #40 at the Billboard Japan Top Albums.
