= Reincarnation (Galneryus album) =

Studio album by Galneryus
- Released: September 10, 2008
- Genres: Power metal, neoclassical metal
- Label: VAP
- Producer: Yorimasa Hisatake

Galneryus chronology
One for All – All for One (2007)	Reincarnation (2008)	Resurrection (2010)

Reincarnation is the fifth studio album by the Japanese power metal band Galneryus. It is the last album to feature vocalist Yama-B. It was released on September 10, 2008.

== Track listing ==
No.	Title	Lyrics	Music	Length
1.	"終わりなき、この詩" (This Poem, Uninterrupted...)	Syu	Syu	7:26
2.	"Blast of Hell"	Yama-B	Syu	6:18
3.	"Blame Yourself"	Yama-B	Syu	7:40
4.	"Shining Moments"	Yu-To, Yama-B	Yu-To	4:37
5.	"Against the Domination"	Yama-B	Yama-B	4:33
6.	"Wind of Change"	Yama-B	Junichi	7:16
7.	"No Exit"	Yama-B	Yu-To	6:22
8.	"Stardust"	Syu, Yama-B	Syu	5:22
9.	"Face to the Real"	Yama-B	Yuhki	6:59
10.	"Seasons Cry"	Yama-B	Syu	5:58
11.	"Fairy Tale"	Yama-B	Yuhki	6:04
12.	"The Flag of Reincarnation"	Yama-B	Syu	8:50

== Credits ==
- Syu: Guitar, backing vocals
- Yama-B: Vocals
- Yu-To: Bass
- Junichi: Drums
- Yuhki: Keyboards, Hammond organ

== Chart performance ==
The album reached number 55 on the Oricon album charts and #66 at the Billboard Japan Top Albums.
