= Advance to the Fall =

Studio album by Galneryus
- Released: March 23, 2005
- Genre: Power metal
- Length: 58:10
- Label: VAP
- Producer: Yorimasa Hisatake

Galneryus chronology
The Flag of Punishment (2003)	Advance to the Fall (2005)	Beyond the End of Despair... (2006)

Advance to the Fall is the second studio album by Japanese power metal band Galneryus. It was released on March 23, 2005.

== Track listing ==
All lyrics are written by Yama-B, except "Stillness Dawn", "Glorious Aggressor" and "Fly With Red Winds" (instrumentals); all music is composed by Syu, except where noted

No.	Title	Length
1.	"Stillness Dawn" (Yuhki)	1:08
2.	"Silent Revelation"	5:58
3.	"Ancient Rage"	4:01
4.	"Fate of the Sadness"	6:26
5.	"Deep Affection" (Yuhki)	7:24
6.	"Dream Place"	5:05
7.	"Glorious Aggressor"	2:08
8.	"Whisper in the Red Sky"	6:05
9.	"The Scenery" (Junichi)	5:36
10.	"Eternal Regret"	5:40
11.	"Quiet Wish"	5:41
12.	"Fly with Red Winds"	2:51

== Credits ==
- Syu – Lead/rhythm guitars/backing vocals
- Yama-B – Vocals
- Tsui – Bass/backing vocals
- Yuhki – Keyboards/backing vocals
- Junichi Satoh – Drums

== Chart performance ==
The album reached number 86 on the Oricon album charts.
