= Galneryus =

Japanese power metal band

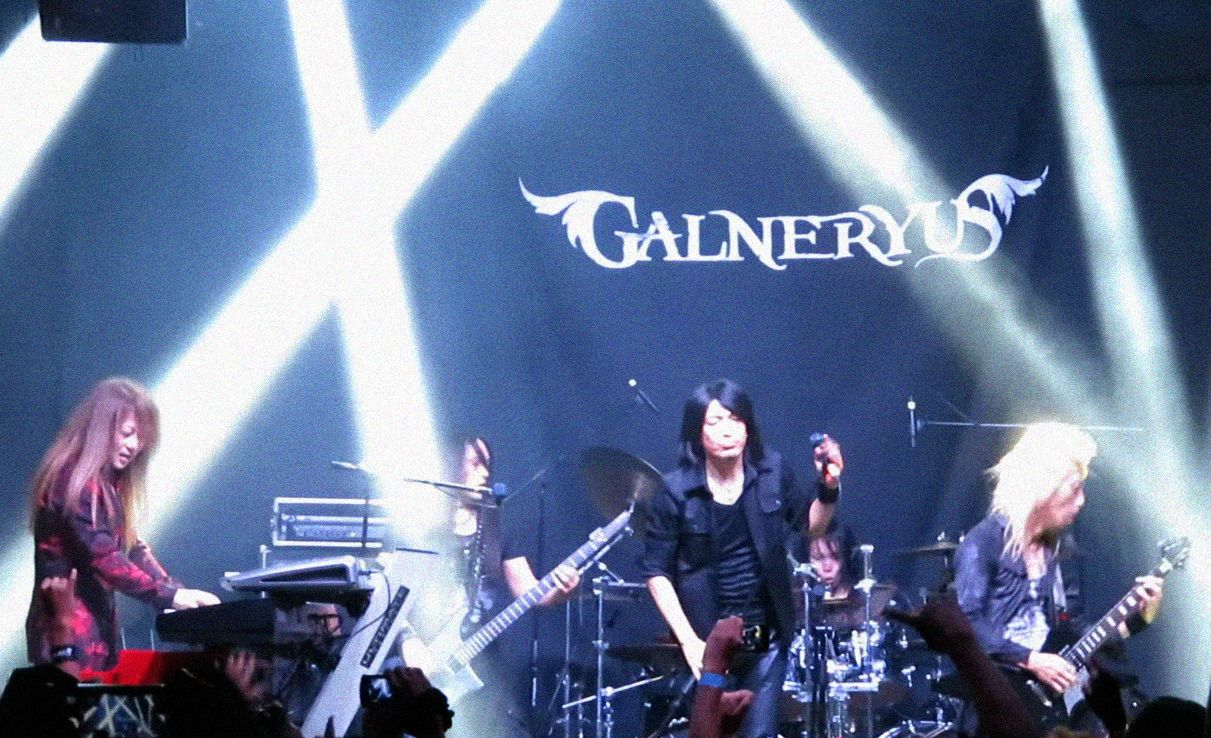
- Galneryus performing in Mexico in 2016. From left to right: Yuhki, Taka, Sho, Fumiya, Syu

Background information
- Origin: Osaka, Japan
- Genres: Power metal; symphonic metal; progressive metal; neoclassical metal
- Years active: 2001–present
- Labels: Iron Shock; VAP; Warner Music Japan
- Members: Syu; Yuhki; Sho; Taka; Lea
- Past members: Tsui; Yama-B; Yu-To; Jun-ichi; Fumiya
- Website: galneryus.jp

Galneryus (Japanese: ガルネリウス, Hepburn: Garuneriusu; stylized as GALNERYUS) is a Japanese power metal band, formed in Osaka in 2001 by guitarist Syu and vocalist Yama-B. Originally the only official members, the two utilized several support musicians until bassist Tsui, keyboardist Yuhki, and drummer Jun-ichi officially joined for the release of their debut album in 2003. Yama-B left the group in 2008 citing musical differences, and Yu-To, who replaced Tsui in 2006, left the following year. Galneryus recruited Sho on vocals and Taka on bass, and released the album Resurrection in 2010. Jun-ichi left in 2016, and the following year the band released their highest-charting studio album, Ultimate Sacrifice, which reached number 13. In 2017, Loudwire named Galneryus one of the 10 Best Japanese Metal Bands.

== History ==
=== 2001–2002: Formation and indie days ===
Galneryus was formed in 2001 by guitarist and bandleader Syu (Valkyr, Animetal, Aushvitz) and vocalist Masahiro "Yama-B" Yamaguchi (AxBites, Rekion, River End and Gunbridge). While at a live house in Kujō, Osaka, Syu heard fellow Kansai-native Yama-B on the radio and knew he wanted to work with him. The name "Galneryus" was derived from Guarnerius violins, which are known for their rich tone in the low and mid ranges. Syu said they felt it was a fitting name because metal is "all about the low end". Both veterans of the metal scene, Syu and Yama-B formed the band with the intention to "express both of their musical tastes/ideas" and so they started looking for additional members to complete the lineup. They recruited A on keyboards (who had previously played with Syu in Valkyr), Shōgo Himuro on bass, and Toshihiro "Tossan" Yui (formerly of Cemetery, Honey Quest) on drums. In October 2001, the band released a two-track demo titled "United Flag". It was self-produced and released independently, but started gaining the attention of both fans and independent record labels as well.

After playing with other metal bands like Fairy Mirror, Mephistopheles, Galactica Phantom, Mastermind, and Concerto Moon, Galneryus went back to the studio to record an EP. Rebel Flag was released through the independent label Iron Shock in August 2002. The EP again used support musicians to fill the band slots, with Shōgo Himuro again on bass, Toshihiro Yui again on drums, and Yoshinori Kataoka on keyboards.

After this EP, the band started receiving several record deals and started touring more. In 2003, they were invited to play the Melodic Metal Festival in Japan which featured Swedish power metal band Dragonland, as well as Australia's Dungeon. As a result, Dragonland invited Galneryus to play with them the next time they toured Japan.

Galneryus was also invited to perform on two metal compilation cover albums with other bands such as Masaki Project, Saber Tiger, and Mephistopheles. Galneryus performed the song "Black Diamond" (originally from Finnish power metal band Stratovarius) on the compilation album Stand Proud! III and performed the song "Soldier of Fortune" (from Japanese heavy metal band Loudness) on the compilation album Japanese Heavy Metal Tribute Tamashii II. For these songs, the band used supporting musicians Toshihiro Yui on drums, Yusuke on bass, and Yuhki on keyboards. Both compilation albums were released simultaneously in December 2002 on the same day through Iron Shock and distributed through the record label VAP.

=== 2003–2007: Gone major and formal members ===
VAP itself signed Galneryus and the band set to work on writing and recording their full-length debut album The Flag of Punishment which featured all 5 EP songs re-written and re-recorded and also cover art by famed Final Fantasy artist Yoshitaka Amano. At this time Galneryus ceased using temporary members and permanently recruited Ryosuke "Tsui" Matsui (formerly of AxBites) on bass, Yuhki (formerly of Ark Storm and Marge Litch) on keyboards and Jun-ichi Satoh (formerly of Concerto Moon) on drums. The album was finally released in October 2003. In March 2005, Galneryus released their second album Advance to the Fall, and later released their third full-length album Beyond the End of Despair... in July 2006.

After the Live for Rebirth tour, Tsui left Galneryus and Yu-To (later known as Leda of Deluhi, Far East Dizain, Kami Band) was recruited to fill in for bass. The band shortly after released their fourth album One for All - All for One on August 22, 2007. On October 27, they released their first cover album Voices from the Past. Galneryus then debuted on iTunes Store, making their material available worldwide.

=== 2008–2011: Yama-B's departure and Resurrection ===
In February 2008, both sides of their double A-side single "Alsatia/Cause Disarray" were used as the opening and ending themes for the six-episode anime series Rin ~Daughters of Mnemosyne~.

On October 10, 2008, it was announced that vocalist Yama-B was leaving the band at the end of the Back to the Flag tour. The decision was made during the recording/releasing of their fifth full album, Reincarnation. According to Yama-B's note left to the fans on Galneryus' official site, he left due to the band's growth and change. In the note, Yama-B stated that due to differences in opinion on the band's style of music, he was leaving. He and the rest of Galneryus are all okay with this and wished each other well as they went their separate ways. Yama-B later elaborated in 2013, recalling that while he and Syu had different musical tastes from the beginning, with every release the band slowly chased after a new sound "instead of doing music we loved". While Yama-B "likes to stick to a certain set of rules, concepts", particularly Syu would spontaneously abandon a style in order to incorporate new inspirations. On October 23, 2008, Galneryus released their second cover album Voices from the Past II, and on March 25, 2009, they released two "best of" albums.

Well-known vocalist Masatoshi "Sho" Ono stepped in as guest vocalist for a May 30, 2009 performance at the tenth anniversary of Pure Rock Japan Live. In September 2009, bassist Yu-To left the group, and Sho and Taka officially joined. This line-up had their first performance at Loud Park Festival 2009. Galneryus' song "A Far-Off Distance" was used as the ending theme of the 2010 Rainbow: Nisha Rokubō no Shichinin anime. On April 21, they released the digital EP Beginning of the Resurrection, which contains a cover of Sho's 1992 hit single "You're the Only...". They released their sixth full-length album, Resurrection, on June 23 and their third cover album, Voices from the Past III, on August 20.

In 2011, their song "Destiny" was used in the music video games GuitarFreaks XG2: Groove on Live and DrumMania XG2: Groove on Live. Also, their song "New Legend" was used in GuitarFreaks XG3 and DrumMania XG3. The band released the limited single "Future Never Dies" on September 7, 2011, and the album Phoenix Rising on October 5.

=== 2012–present: Angel of Salvation, European tour and new drummers ===
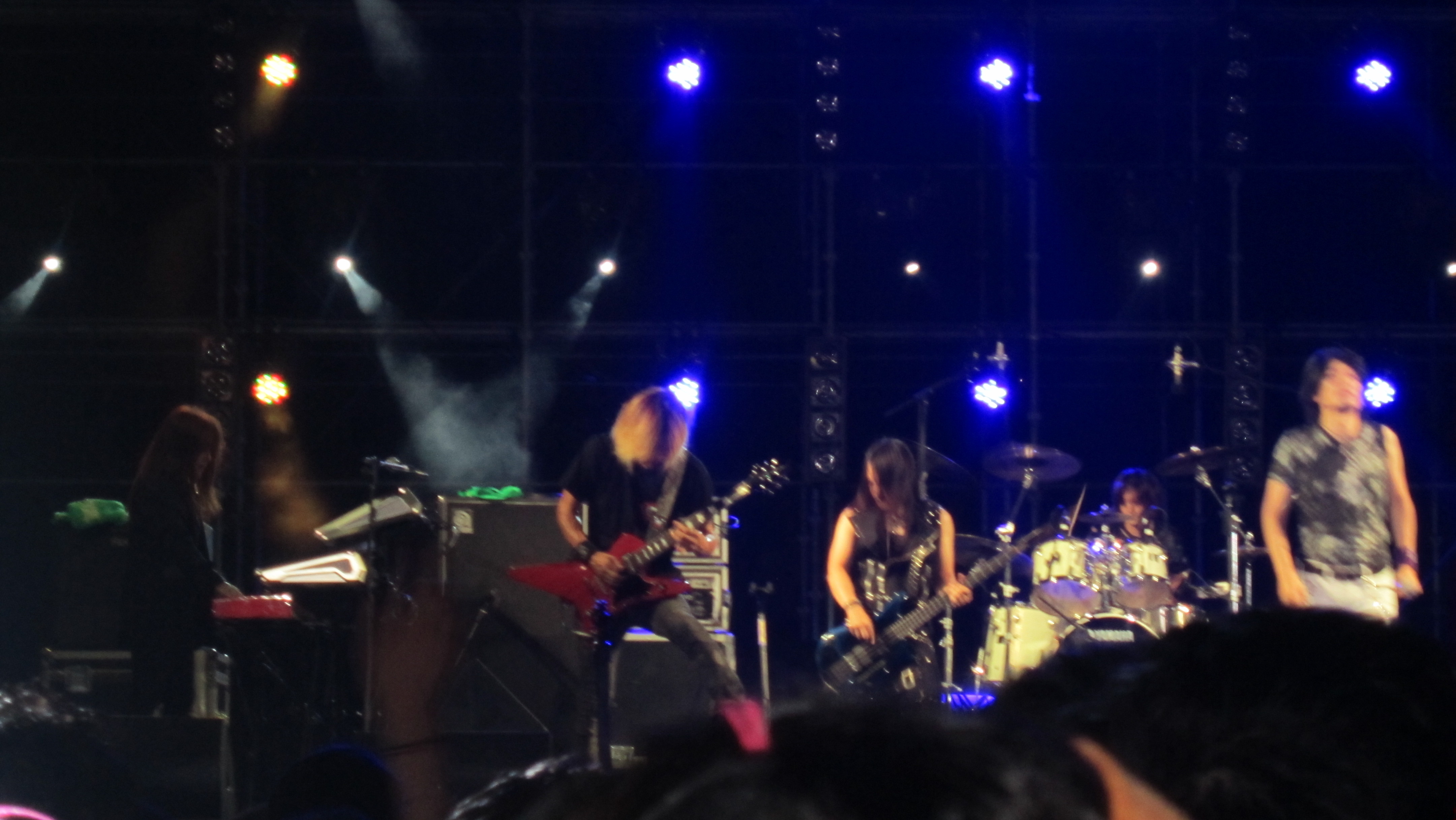
Galneryus performing at the Busan Rock Festival in Korea, 2012

On January 25, 2012, they released the mini-album Kizuna. The title song was used in a Fist of the Blue Sky pachinko game, and its cover features the series' main character. Galneryus' next single, "Hunting for Your Dream", was used as the second closing theme of the new Hunter × Hunter anime adaptation. Both Kizuna and the Type A edition of "Hunting for Your Dream" include a cover of Ono's solo song "Departure!"; the former features an English version, and the latter a Japanese one.

Their eighth studio album Angel of Salvation was released on October 10, 2012, and reached number 17 on the Oricon chart. The title track, which interpolates "Violin Concerto in D major, Op. 35" by Pyotr Ilyich Tchaikovsky, is 14:42 minutes long, twice as long as the version featured in its music video, and features Akane Liv (of Liv Moon) performing backing vocals. Yuhki, alongside the band, collaborated with acclaimed video game composer Daisuke Ishiwatari to create the soundtrack for the Japanese fighting game BlazBlue: Chrono Phantasma, which released in arcades in November 2012, performing arrangements for most of the series' original themes.

On May 22, 2013, Galneryus released their first self-cover album, The Ironhearted Flag Vol. 1: Regeneration Side. It became their highest-charting release to date, reaching number 15, and is part of their 10th anniversary celebration, which also included a tour from June 7 to 30. On May 26, they performed at the Pure Rock Japan Live 2013 at Club Citta, alongside Nogod, Saber Tiger and Onmyo-Za.

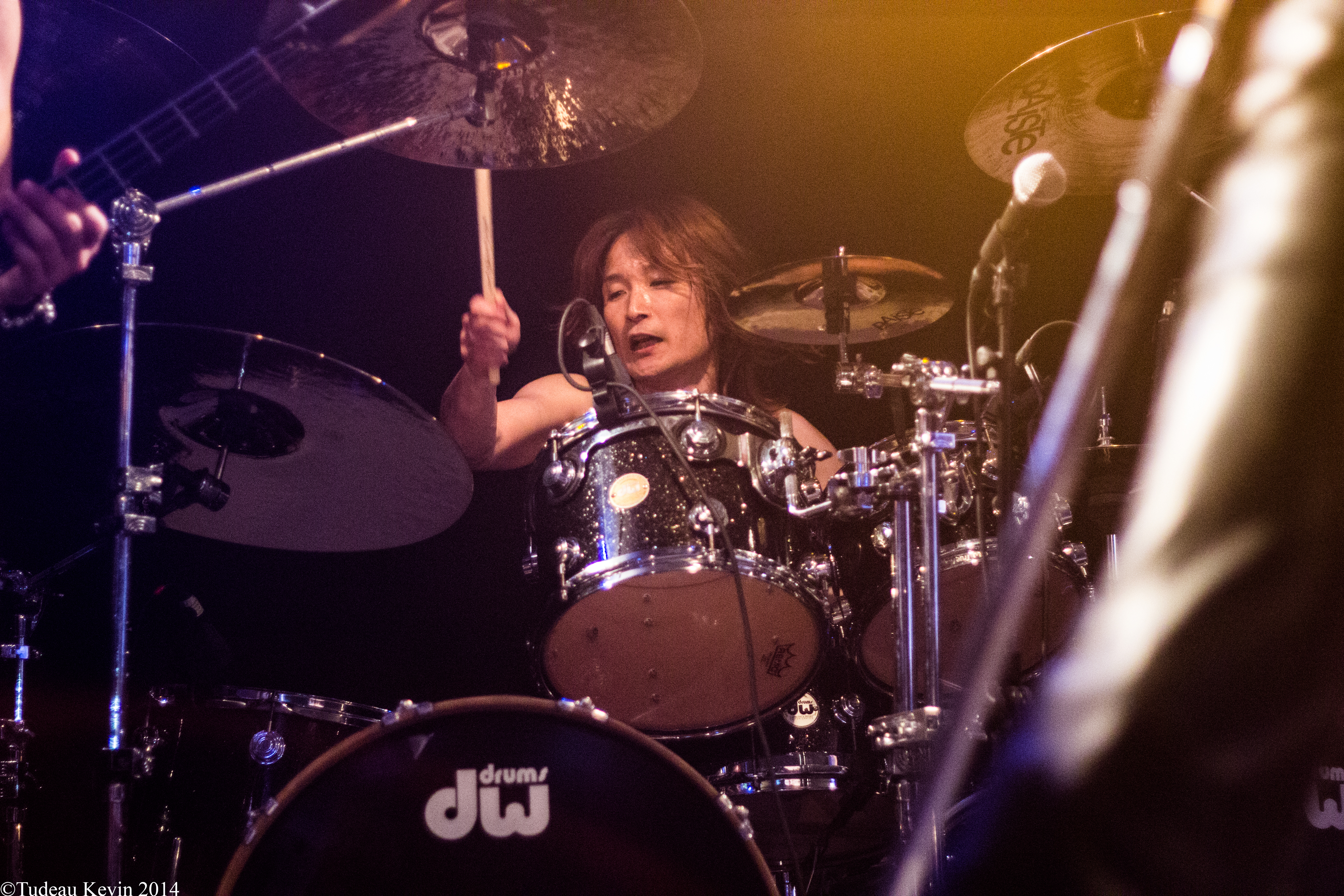
Jun-ichi was Galneryus' drummer from 2003 to 2016.

Galneryus embarked on their first European tour in July 2014. Beginning in Germany, the four date tour also took them to France before finishing in Spain. They released the album Vetelgyus in September 2014. Galneryus' song "Attitude to Life" was used as the ending theme for the anime television series Laughing Under the Clouds. Galneryus released Under the Force of Courage, their tenth studio album and first concept album in December 2015. It became their highest-charting studio album, reaching number 13.

In June 2016, it was announced that drummer Jun-ichi had amicably left Galneryus after 13 years. Syu later said that since Jun-ichi lived in Osaka, taught at a music school and had other musical projects, it had become difficult for him to balance them all as Galneryus' activities grew. He was replaced by Fumiya of the groups Thousand Eyes and Undead Corporation. The following year they changed record labels for the first time in 14 years, switching to Warner Music Japan for the September 27, 2017 release of Ultimate Sacrifice. It continues the concept of their previous album, and has since become their highest-charting studio album, reaching number 13 on the Oricon chart.

They released their 12th studio album, Into the Purgatory, on October 23, 2019. It was supported by the 10-date ~Radiance~ Wailing in the Flames of Purgatory tour that also celebrated their 15th anniversary. On June 2, 2020, Galneryus announced that Fumiya had left the band. They also revealed his replacement, Lea of the band 罪號人~Zygote~, who claimed to be influenced by both Jun-ichi and Fumiya. The band released the albums Union Gives Strength on June 16, 2021, and Between Dread and Valor on March 1, 2023. Both are referred to as "special albums" due to the number of songs they include, but Syu said there is no particularly big meaning behind it and they are essentially regular studio albums.

== Musical style and lyrical themes ==
Syu has described the music of Galneryus as symphonic metal, classic metal and progressive metal. He said that while they are very much influenced by European music, they mix it with the Japanese concept of wabi-sabi to create emotional music. At the outset of the group, Yama-B and Syu wanted to stand out and so, among other things, wore armour and a red enamel outfit respectively. However, they eventually changed their minds and wanted to convey their music most of all. Syu explained, "The better we are, the more attention we will get." The members of Galneryus are known for their high level of technical proficiency with their instruments, but they consider melody the most important factor in their songs. Syu said a song must still be good even when stripped down to just vocals and piano. The guitarist has also said that while he wants to stand out, the vocalist should stand out the most.

When composing music and trying to decide which of his projects the song will go to, Syu said he imagines the vocalist's voice and whether or not it matches the song. Because Galneryus has a keyboardist, the guitarist said he can "enlarge the world [he is] creating and be adventurous" with their music. In 2017, Syu said their previous three albums were mainly written by him and keyboardist Yuhki, with him usually writing the song first before Yuhki adds "compositions." Yuhki said that in general, up until their fifth album Reincarnation, they all entered the studio together and created the arrangement by jamming.

During his time with the band, the lyrics were written by Yama-B and usually in English. In 2006, they released their first song in Japanese with Syu explaining; "English is not our native tongue, so it's hard to convey our feelings in it, and Japanese listeners listen to our voice just as melodies, I guess. So if we sing in Japanese, I think we can convey more of what we feel." The Japanese lyrics continued when Sho joined for the same reasons. He usually asks the composer what kind of imagery they want the song to have before writing them.

The songs on their first three albums tell a story, and although he said Yama-B was better suited for the task, Syu briefly described it as the adventure of a man named Galneri. Galneri failed to defeat the bad guy on the first album and was going to try again on the second, but his friends died one after another until finally only Galneri was left and he fell into despair by the end of the second album. On the third album, Galneri fights a dragon before teaming up with him to finally defeat the bad guy. The hero and dragon both die in the end, but the final song, "Rebirth", is about a woman who fell in love with the hero before he died and became pregnant. Their 2015 album Under the Force of Courage is a concept album with a single story, although its follow up also continued the concept. Yuhki composed its songs "Rain of Tears" and "Soul of the Field" specifically to utilize Syu's death growl.

== Members ==
Current members

- Syu – guitar, backing vocals, leader (2001–present)
- Yuhki – keyboards, Hammond organ, keytar, backing vocals (2003–present, support in 2002)
- Masatoshi "Sho" Ono (小野 正利, Ono Masatoshi) – vocals (2009–present)
- Taka – bass (2009–present)
- Lea – drums (2020–present)

Former members

- Ryosuke "Tsui" Matsui (松井 亮介, Matsui Ryōsuke) – bass, backing vocals (2003–2006)
- Masahiro "Yama-B" Yamaguchi (山口 将宏, Yamaguchi Masahiro) – vocals (2001–2008)
- Yu-To – bass, backing vocals (2006–2009); support guitar as Leda (2011)
- Jun-ichi Satoh (佐藤 潤一, Satō Jun'ichi) – drums (2003–2016)
- Fumiya Morishita (森下フミヤ, Morishita Fumiya) – drums (2016–2020)

Former touring musicians

- Shōgo Himuro – bass (2001–2002)
- A – keyboards (2001–2002)
- Yoshinori Kataoka – keyboards (2002)
- Toshihiro "Tossan" Yui – drums (2001–2002)
- Yusuke – bass (2002–2003)

Timeline

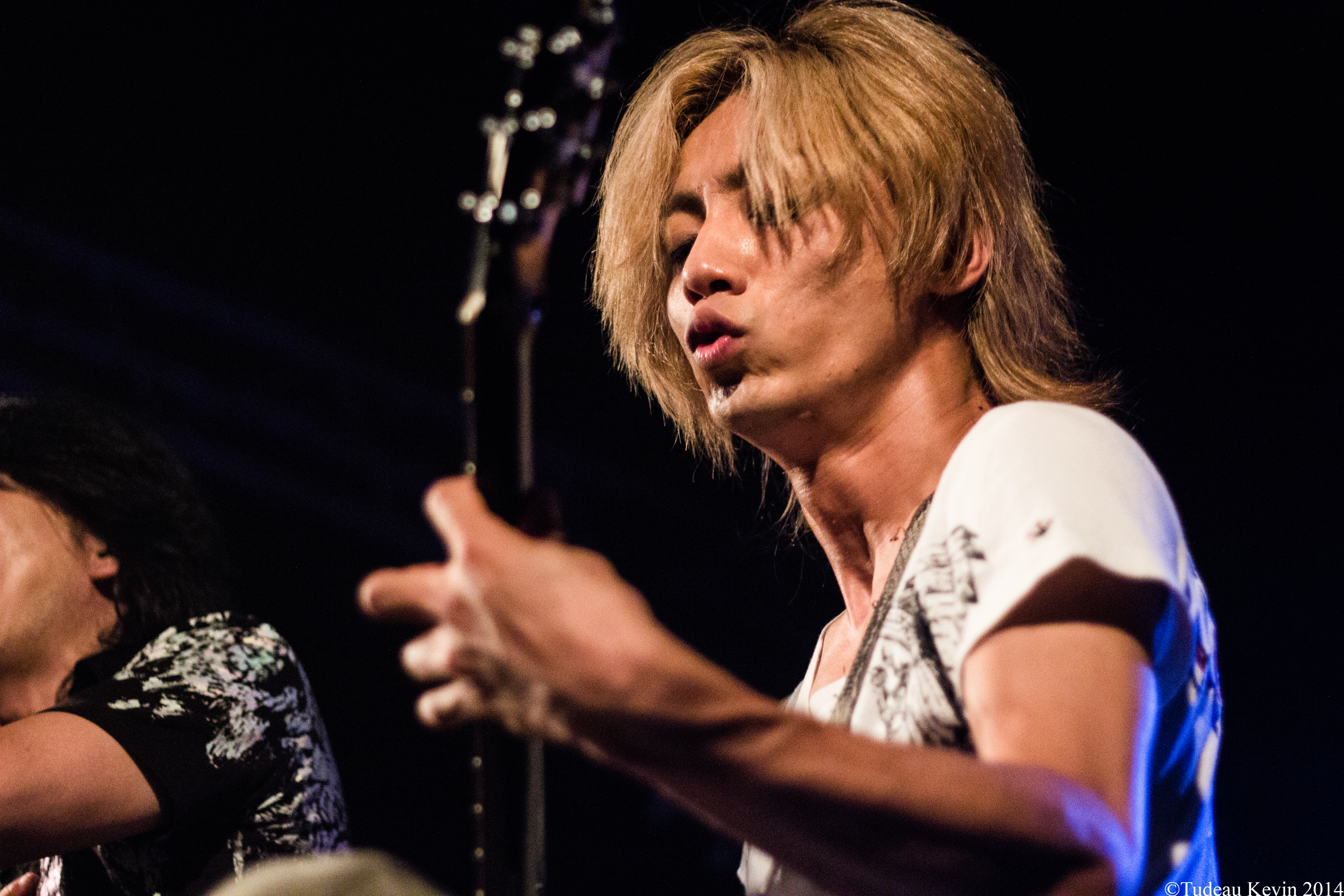
Syu

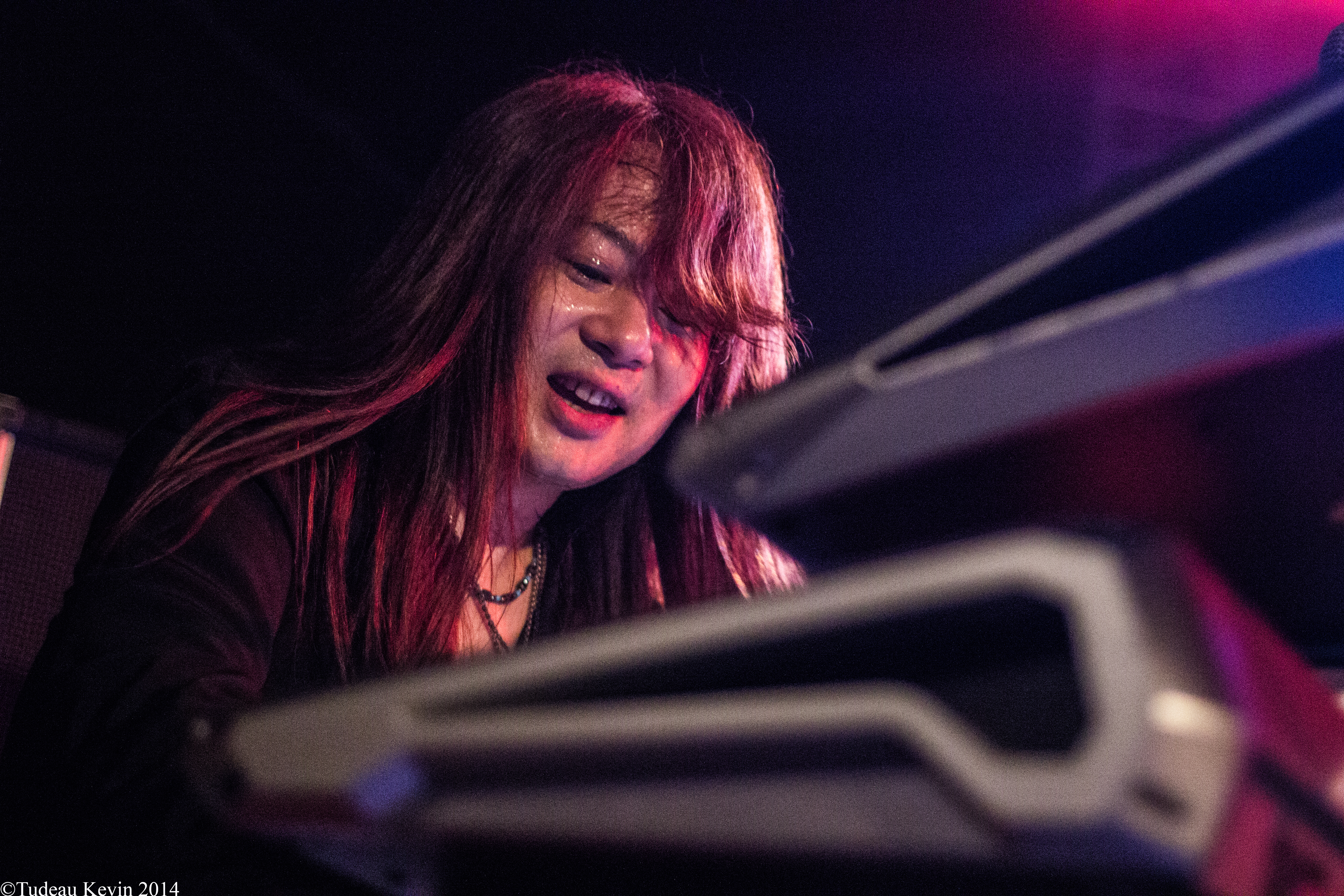
Yuhki

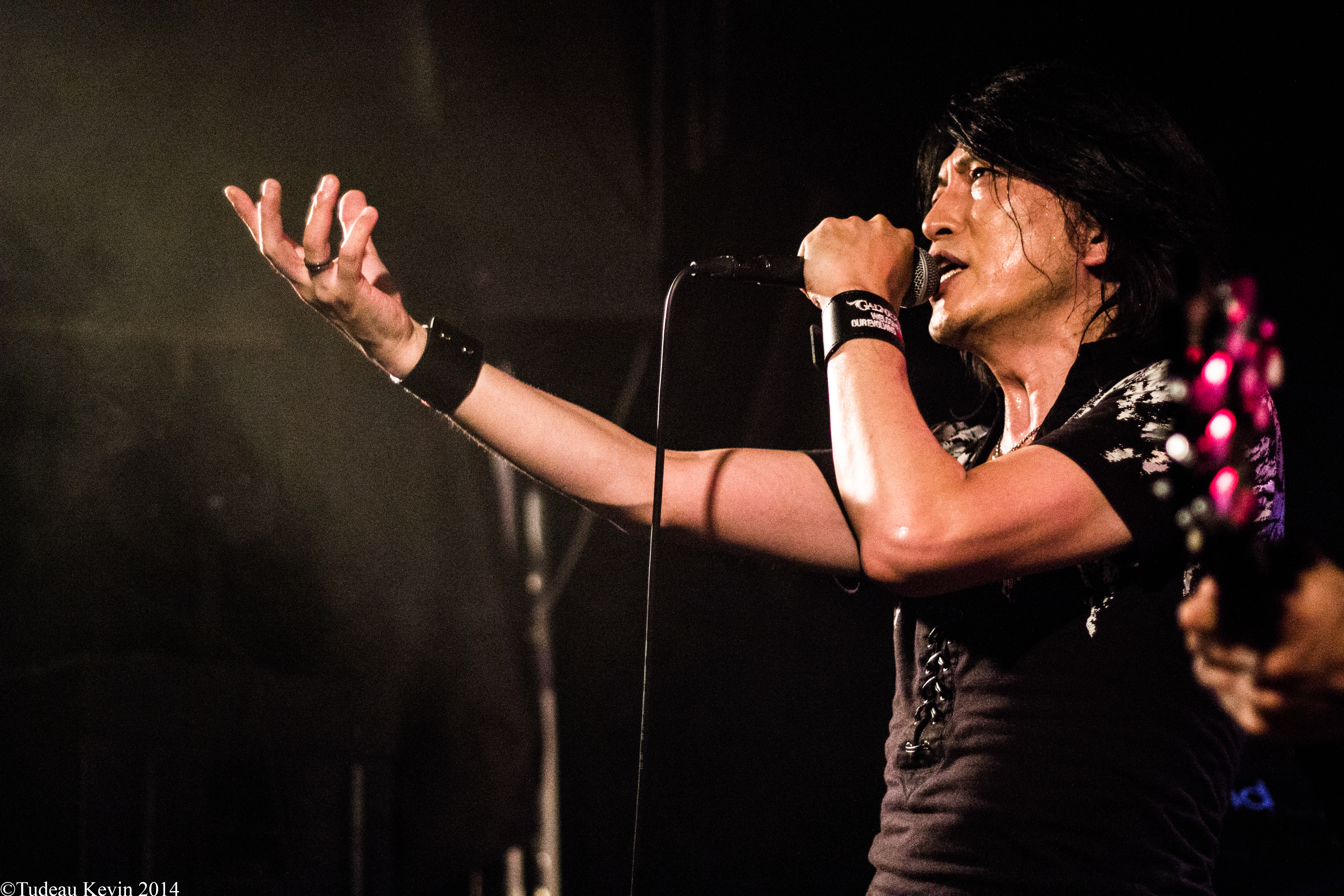
Sho

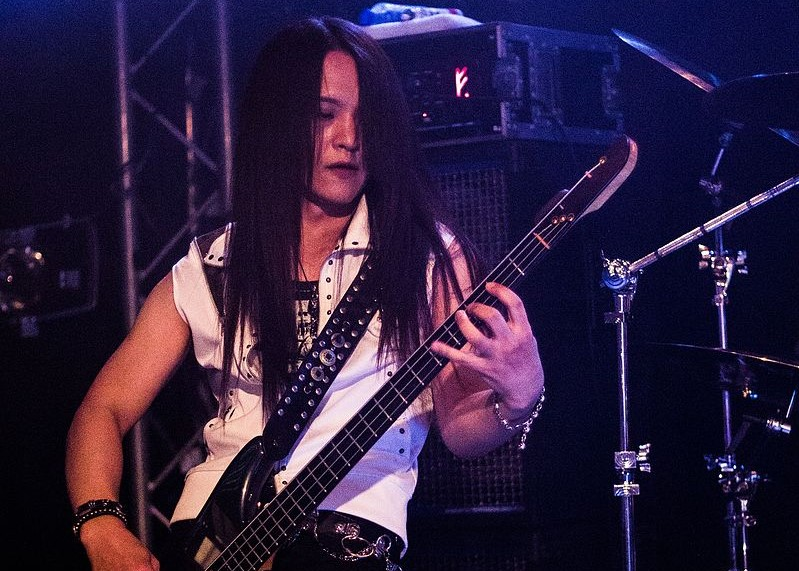
Taka

== Discography ==
=== Studio albums ===
Year	Album details	Oricon
2003	The Flag of Punishment: Released: October 22, 2003; Label: VAP	161
2005	Advance to the Fall: Released: March 23, 2005; Label: VAP	86
2006	Beyond the End of Despair...: Released: July 12, 2006; Label: VAP	57
2007	One for All - All for One: Released: August 22, 2007; Label: VAP	53
2008	Reincarnation: Released: September 10, 2008; Label: VAP	55
2010	Resurrection: Released: June 23, 2010; Label: VAP	35
2011	Phoenix Rising: Released: October 5, 2011; Label: VAP	23
2012	Angel of Salvation: Released: October 10, 2012; Label: VAP	17
2014	Vetelgyus: Released: September 24, 2014; Label: VAP	18
2015	Under the Force of Courage: Released: December 9, 2015; Label: VAP	21
2017	Ultimate Sacrifice: Released: September 27, 2017; Label: Warner Music Japan	13
2019	Into the Purgatory: Released: October 23, 2019; Label: Warner Music Japan	18
2021	Union Gives Strength: Released: June 16, 2021; Label: Warner Music Japan	17
2023	Between Dread and Valor: Released: March 1, 2023; Label: Warner Music Japan	17
2024	The Stars Will Light the Way: Released: September 25, 2024; Label: Warner Music Japan	25
2026	A Cry from the Sky Above: Released: July 15, 2026; Label: Warner Music Japan	24

=== EPs ===
Year	Album details	Oricon
2008	Shining Moments: Released: July 30, 2008	—
2010	Beginning of the Resurrection: Released: April 21, 2010	—
2012	Kizuna (絆): Released: January 25, 2012	37

=== Singles ===
Year	Title	Oricon
2001	"United Flag": Demo; Released: October 21, 2001	—
2002	"Rebel Flag": Released: August 23, 2002	—
2007	"Everlasting": Released: June 27, 2007	68
2008	"Alsatia/Cause Disarray": Released: March 19, 2008	60
2008	"Shining Moments": Digital; Released: July 30, 2008	—
2010	"Beginning of the Resurrection": Digital; Released: April 21, 2010	—
2011	"Future Never Dies": Digital; Released: September 7, 2011	—
2011	"Kizuna (Fist of the Blue Sky)" (絆 (FIST OF THE BLUE SKY)): Digital; Released: November 30, 2011	—
2012	"Hunting for Your Dream": Released: July 17, 2012	30
2014	"Attitude to Life": Released: December 3, 2014	54
2023	"Run to the Edge": Digital; Released: January 18, 2023	—

=== Cover albums ===
Year	Album details	Oricon
2007	Voices from the Past: Released: October 8, 2007	—
2008	Voices from the Past II: Released: October 23, 2008	—
2010	Voices from the Past III: Released: August 20, 2010	—
2013	The Ironhearted Flag Vol. 1: Regeneration Side: Self-cover; Released: May 22, 2013	15
2013	The Ironhearted Flag Vol. 2: Reformation Side: Self-cover; Released: September 4, 2013	17

=== Live albums ===
Year	Album details	Oricon
2014	Reliving the Ironhearted Flag: Released: March 26, 2014; Label: VAP	103

=== Compilation albums ===
Year	Album details	Oricon
2009	Best of the Braving Days: Released: March 25, 2009	154
2009	Best of the Awakening Days: Released: March 25, 2009	157
2012	Best-R: Rental only; Released: September 25, 2012	—

=== Compilation appearances ===
Year	Song	Album	Release date
2002	"Black Diamond" (originally by Stratovarius)	Stand Proud! III (スタンド・プラウド! III)	December 11, 2002
2002	"Soldier of Fortune" (originally by Loudness)	Japanese Heavy Metal Tribute Tamashii II (~JAPANESE HEAVY METAL TRIBUTE~魂II)	December 11, 2002
2004	"Struggle for the Freedom Flag"	Hard Rock Summit in Osaka	June 16, 2004
2006	"Serenade" (D.N. mix)	The Songs For Death Note The Movie ~The Last Name Tribute~	December 20, 2006
2010	"A Far-Off Distance" (TV Size)	Rainbow: Nisha Rokubō no Shichinin Opening/Ending theme digital EP	June 16, 2010
2010	"Holy Blood: Tatakai no Kettō" (originally by Seikima-II) (HOLY BLOOD 〜闘いの血統〜)	Tribute to Seikima-II: Akuma to no Keiyakusho (Tribute to 聖飢魔II -悪魔との契約書-)	September 15, 2010
2010	"Against the Wind" (originally by Stratovarius)	Crying Stars -Stand Proud!-	September 29, 2010
2010	"The Spirit Carries On" (originally by Dream Theater)	Crying Stars -Stand Proud!-	September 29, 2010
2011	"Tonight I'm Falling" (originally by TNT)	The Voice -Stand Proud!-	October 5, 2011
2011	"Angel Don't Cry" (originally by Toto)	The Voice -Stand Proud!-	October 5, 2011

=== Home videos ===
Year	Title	Oricon
2006	Live for Rebirth: Released: November 22, 2006	DVD: 142
2008	Live for All - Live for One: Released: March 5, 2008	DVD: 85
2010	Live in the Moment of the Resurrection: Released: December 8, 2010	DVD: 47
2012	Phoenix Living in the Rising Sun: Released: March 28, 2012	DVD: 47
2014	Reliving the Ironhearted Flag: Released: March 26, 2014	BD: 44
2015	Attitude to Live: Released: May 20, 2015	DVD: 42; BD: 18
2016	The Sense of Our Lives: Released: September 9, 2016	DVD: 66; BD: 19
2018	Just Play to the Sky ~What Could We Do For You...?~: Released: April 25, 2018	DVD: 75; BD: 46
2020	Falling into the Flames of Purgatory: Released: October 7, 2020	DVD: 26; BD: 15
