= Beyond the End of Despair... =

Studio album by Galneryus
- Released: July 12, 2006
- Genre: Power metal
- Label: VAP
- Producer: Yorimasa Hisatake

Galneryus chronology
Advance to the Fall (2005)	Beyond the End of Despair... (2006)	One for All – All for One (2007)

Beyond the End of Despair... is the third full-length album by Japanese power metal band Galneryus. It was released on July 12, 2006.

== Track listing ==
All lyrics are written by Yama-B, except "Arise" and "Rebirth..." (instrumentals); all music is composed by Syu, except where noted.

No.	Title	Length
1.	"Arise"	2:09
2.	"Shriek of the Vengeance"	4:33
3.	"Raid Again" (Yama-B)	4:31
4.	"Shiver"	7:06
5.	"Point of No Return" (Yuhki)	6:07
6.	"In the Cage"	5:20
7.	"Heavy Curse"	5:24
8.	"Vanishing Hope" (Junichi)	5:18
9.	"Dawn of Tragedy"	6:02
10.	"My Last Farewell"	5:04
11.	"Braving Flag"	4:49
12.	"Rebirth..."	1:51

== Credits ==
- Syu - Lead/rhythm guitars/backing vocals
- Yama-B - Vocals
- Tsui - Bass/backing vocals
- Yuhki - Keyboards/backing vocals
- Junichi Satoh - Drums

== Chart performance ==
The album reached number 57 on the Oricon album charts.
