= Departure! =

Single by Masatoshi Ono
- Language: Japanese
- Released: December 21, 2011
- Length: 4:14
- Label: VAP
- Songwriter: Hitoshi Haba

Masatoshi Ono singles chronology
"I Wish ~ I Hope" (2003)	"Departure!" (2011)	"Knock On Your Gate!" (2014)

"Departure!" is a song by Japanese singer Masatoshi Ono, released by VAP on December 21, 2011. It was used as the opening theme of the 2011 anime adaptation of Hunter × Hunter. The single peaked at number 100 on Billboard Japan's Top Singles Chart and 118 on the Oricon Singles Chart. Ono also recorded two versions of the song with his heavy metal band Galneryus.

== Background and development ==
"Departure!" was produced to be the opening theme song of the 2011 Hunter × Hunter anime adaptation. The song marks Masatoshi Ono's first solo single in eight years, as he primarily spent the preceding few years as lead vocalist of the heavy metal band Galneryus. The production committee, including representatives from Madhouse and Nippon TV, selected the track to serve as a constant throughout the series.

Unlike most long-running anime series that change opening themes every 25 episodes, "Departure!" was used for all 148 episodes of the 2011 adaptation. This decision was intended to create a long-term brand association between the melody and the franchise, similar to how YuYu Hakusho—another work by series creator Yoshihiro Togashi—utilized a single opening theme for its entire run.

== Composition and lyrics ==
The song was written and composed by Hitoshi Haba, with additional lyrical credit given to "Team Hunter". The arrangement was handled by Yutaka Shinya. It is a rock composition written in the key of B-flat major with a tempo of 170 beats per minute.

The lyrics are centered on themes of adventure, friendship, and the concept of a "new beginning." The opening line, "You can smile again," serves as a hook that remains consistent across all versions of the song. While the instrumentation is rooted in pop-rock, it features high-tenor vocal deliveries from Ono that reflect his background in heavy metal music.

== Release and versions ==
The "Departure!" single was released on December 21, 2011, by the label VAP. Two primary versions of the song were featured in the broadcast:

- "Departure!": The original version using the first verse, appearing in early story arcs such as the "Hunter Exam."
- "Departure! -Second Version-": A variant using the second verse of the full song, utilized during the "Greed Island" and "Chimera Ant" arcs.

Ono also recorded two versions with his heavy metal band Galneryus; a Japanese version for their January 2012 EP Kizuna, and an English version included on the Type A edition of their July 2012 single "Hunting for Your Dream".

August 2012's Hunter × Hunter Character Song-shū ~Tenkū Tōgiba-hen~ features "Departure! -Killua Version-", a version of the song sung by Mariya Ise, voice actress of the anime's character Killua Zoldyck, while September 2012's Hunter × Hunter Character Song-shū ~Genei Ryodan-hen~ features "Departure! -Gon Version-", a version of the song sung by Megumi Han, voice actress of the anime's protagonist Gon Freecss.

== Commercial performance ==
"Departure!" reached number 100 on Billboard Japan's Top Singles Chart. It peaked at 118 on the Oricon Singles Chart.

== Reception ==
On the song, OK Music wrote that Ono uses his four-octave vocal range to deliver "a melodic tune that captures the very essence of the anime's worldview, translating it directly into music." CD Journal wrote that "Departure!" fully showcases Ono's greatest asset; "a high-pitched, soaring vocal delivery that rings out with striking clarity."

== Track listing ==
All music is composed by Hitoshi Haba and arranged by Shinya Yutaka, except track 4, composed and arranged by Yoshihisa Hirano.

No.	Title	Lyrics	Length
1.	"Departure!"	Hitoshi Haba, Team Hunter	4:17
2.	"Departure! (TV Size)"		1:25
3.	"Departure! (Karaoke)"		4:17
4.	"The World of Adventurers: Hunter × Hunter Theme (Short Ver.)"		1:08
