= Vegetable Fairies: N.Y. Salad =

Japanese anime television series

- Created by: Yoshitaka Amano
- Anime television series
- Directed by: Hiroaki Matsu
- Written by: Hiroaki Matsu
- Music by: Koichi Fujino
- Studio: Digital Media Lab
- Original network: NHK Educational TV
- Original run: April 5, 2007 – June 27, 2008
- Episodes: 52
- Anime film

Vegetable Fairies: N.Y. SALAD The Movie 3D
- Released: February 13, 2010

Vegetable Fairies: N.Y. Salad (やさいのようせい N.Y.SALAD, Yasai no Yousei: N.Y. Salad) is a Japanese anime television series based on the N.Y.SALAD art book by Yoshitaka Amano. It aired on NHK Educational TV from 2007 to 2008. It depicts the lives of vegetable fairies at a kitchen in New York City. An anime film, Vegetable Fairies: N.Y. SALAD The Movie 3D, was released in 2010.

== Characters ==
Brussels Sprouts
Voiced by Yuri Shiratori
Garlic
Voiced by Touko Aoyama
White Eggplant
Voiced by Miyu Matsuki
Lettuce
Voiced by Ai Iiura and Saori Gotō
Cherry Tomato
Voiced by Yuko Miyazaki
Auntie Sunny
Voiced by Itsumi Kikuchi
Jalapeño
Voiced by Tetsuharu Ōta
Potato
Voiced by Dai Izomi
Carrot
Voiced by Tetsuharu Ōta
