= Saber Tiger =

Japanese heavy metal band

- Origin: Sapporo, Hokkaido, Japan
- Genres: Heavy metal
- Years active: 1981–present
- Labels: Fasten Up; Tusk Force; Future Force (Far East Music Products); Future Force (Fandango) (EU); Tokuma Japan Communications; VAP; Edge Trax; Sliptrick
- Members: Akihito Kinoshita; Yasuharu Tanaka; Takenori Shimoyama; Yasuhiro Mizuno; Hibiki
- Website: sabertiger.net

Saber Tiger (Japanese: サーベル・タイガー, Hepburn: Saberu Taiga) is a Japanese heavy metal band from Sapporo. It was founded in 1981 by guitarist and sole-constant member Akihito Kinoshita - as well as two other musicians - who is responsible for producing, engineering and composing most of the band's work.

== Biography ==
Saber Tiger was formed by guitarist Akihito Kinoshita and the Iwai brothers in 1981. After releasing three albums through an independent record label, the band had what appeared to be a temporary break-up. However, Kinoshita worked around this and signed a major label contract with Tokuma Japan Communications. Saber Tiger's 1997 major debut album, Project One, thrust the band to the front of the flourishing Japanese metal scene. The album is essentially a solo album from Kinoshita, with famous guest musicians; vocalist Ron Keel (ex-Steeler and Keel), bassist Naoto Shibata (Anthem) and drummer Hirotsugu Honma (ex-Ezo and Loudness).

Saber Tiger then went on to record while officially reformed with Takenori Shimoyama on vocals, Tomohiro Sanpei on bass and Yoshio Isoda on drums.

Working together they produced two more albums, Paragraph 3 and Brain Drain. In 2001, Saber Tiger made their first release under their new independent label VAP, naming the album simply Saber Tiger. With VAP they continued on to release F.U.S.E., The History of the New World -凶獣伝説- and the single "Eternal Loop", which was featured in Season 1 of Hajime no Ippo. Paragraph 3 and The History of the New World -凶獣伝説- were re-recorded compilations of the band's signature songs, with the new line-up and a heavier, more driven sound. They also released a live album named Live 2002 Nostalgia on both CD and DVD.

In 2002, due to different musical ideas and goals, Shimoyama left the band to pursue his own ambitions in the heavy metal music scene. He formed the band Double Dealer, with Norifumi Shima. They signed a European-wide record contract with NTS/Limb Music, traveling through Europe on a tour with Symphony X.

After Shimoyama's departure, Saber Tiger continued to write and record new music, producing the album Indignation in 2005, with vocalist Katsuto Suzuki.

In 2010, Saber Tiger announced a reunion with former members Takenori Shimoyama (vocals), Yasuharu "Machine" Tanaka (guitar) and Tomohiro Sampei (bass), and with Yasuhiro Mizuno as their new drummer. Eventually Takanobu Kimoto (ex-Double Dealer and Concerto Moon) replaced Sampei on bass. They began working on a new album at a studio in their hometown of Sapporo. The album Decisive was released on August 3, 2011, and was followed by a tour. On May 26, 2013, they performed at the Pure Rock Japan Live 2013 at Club Citta, alongside Nogod, Galneryus and Onmyo-Za.

Their album Obscure Diversity was mixed and mastered by Simone Mularoni of DGM and released on October 10, 2018. It received a Latvian release by Sliptrick Records.

== Members ==
- Akihito Kinoshita - guitar, leader
- Yasuharu "Machine" Tanaka - guitar
- Takenori Shimoyama - vocals
- Yasuhiro Mizuno - drums
- Hibiki - bass

=== Former members ===
Vocals:

- Masahiro Imai
- Takayuki Takizawa
- Hiroaki Yamaguchi
- Yasuo Sasai
- Youichi Koizumi
- Toru Watanabe
- Yoko Kubota
- Ron Keel
- Katsuto Suzuki
- Sakebi

Guitar:

- Hidetoshi Takeda

Bass:

- Masahiro Imai
- Fumiaki Sato
- Takayuki Takizawa
- Akira Mogi
- Masahiko Hoshiba
- Yuichi Hayase
- Tomohiro Sampei
- Takashi Yamazumi
- Satoru Takeuchi
- Naoto Shibata
- Tomohiro Sanpei
- Takanobu Kimoto

Drums:

- Yoshio Isoda
- Koji Imai
- Shinichi Shirai
- Masafumi Minato
- Hiroyuki Sugano
- Junichi Sasaki
- Mitsuhiro Tsuji
- Yuichi Sugiyama
- Nobuyuki Kodera
- Akihiro Iiyama
- Hirotsugu Homma
- Hideaki Yumida
- Masayuki Suzuki

== Discography ==
=== Studio albums ===
- Invasion (April 21, 1992)
- Agitation (August 25, 1994)
- Timystery (October 25, 1995)
- Project One (February 5, 1997)
- Brain Drain (February 21, 1998)
- Saber Tiger (January 24, 2001)
- F.U.S.E. (March 13, 2002)
- Indignation (January 26, 2005)
- Decisive (August 3, 2011)
- Messiah Complex (October 10, 2012)
- Bystander Effect (November 23, 2015)
- Obscure Diversity (October 10, 2018)
- Eliminated (September 2024)

=== International studio albums ===
- Decisive - International Edition (January 20, 2018)
- Bystander Effect - Expanded Edition (March 13, 2018)
- Messiah Complex - International Edition (January 20, 2018)
- Bystander Effect - International Edition (January 20, 2018)
- Live: Halos and Glare (April 25, 2018)
- Unorthodox Paragraph (July 17, 2018)

=== Singles ===
- "Eternal Loop" (November 21, 2001)
- "Hate Crime" (August 8, 2012)

=== EPs ===
- Rise (1986)
- Crush & Dush (1987)
- Money (December 18, 2019, 7-inch+CD)

=== Live albums ===
- Live 2002 Nostalgia (April 23, 2003)

=== Compilation albums ===
- Paragraph (May 1, 1991)
- Paragraph 2 (April 23, 1994)
- Paragraph 3 - Museum (September 23, 1998)
- The History of the New World (February 21, 2001)
- Paragraph IV (December 21, 2011)
- Halos and Glare - The Complete Trilogy (February 28, 2018, box set)
- Halos and Glare - Highlight Edition (February 28, 2018)
- The Shade of Holy Light (Extended) (December 18, 2019)
- Paragraph V (January 20, 2021)

=== Home videos ===
- Live 2002 Nostalgia (April 23, 2003)
- Live: Halos and Glare (April 25, 2018, DVD+2CD)
- Devastation Trail: The Documentary (March 13, 2019, DVD+CD)
- Obscure Diversity (February 12, 2020, 2DVD+2CD)
