= Concerto Moon =

Japanese metal band

- Origin: Tokyo, Japan
- Genres: Power metal Heavy metal Neoclassical metal
- Years active: 1996–2004; 2007–present
- Labels: VAP; InsideOut Records; Triumph Records; Walküre Records
- Members: Norifumi Shima; Shigeharu Nakayasu; Atsushi Kawatsuka; Ryo Miyake; Keiichi
- Past members: Takao Ozaki; Osamu Harada; Nobuho Yoshioka; Kohsaku Mitani; Ichiro Nagai; Toshiyuki Koike; Takashi Inoue; Junichi Sato; Takanobu Kimoto; Shoichi Takeoka; Masayuki Osada; Toshiyuki Suguimori; Aki; Atsushi Kuze; Wataru Haga
- Website: concerto-moon.com

Concerto Moon (コンチェルト・ムーン, Koncheruto Mūn) is a Japanese neoclassical metal/power metal band formed in 1996 and led by guitarist Norifumi Shima.

The band's first two albums were reissued by InsideOut Music in 2003.

== History ==
=== 1996–1997: Formation and early days ===
In 1995, Shima met Takao Ozaki, who was fronting the band Zenith at the time, while Shima was the guitarist of Crystal Clear. Both bands were formed in the early 1990s and were drawing in a lot of attention in the Japanese hard rock scene, releasing a few demos and playing successful shows at venues such as Rokumeikan. Both bands debuted on Mandrake Root Records' Make It Shine video and album releases. As such, the formation of Concerto Moon happened to be the idea of Zenith guitarist Tsutomu Toya, who decided to break up the band in order to go major with Blue Stealer (featuring singer Tomoko "Killer" Yamamoto of Volfeed, who also split up the band for this reason). Due to this, both Toya and bassist Tsutomu Onda went along with the plan, and three-fifths of Zenith's final line-up (consisting of Ozaki on vocals, Osamu Harada on keyboards, and Nobuho Yoshioka on drums) joined Shima on forming Concerto Moon in 1996. Lacking a bassist at the time (Crystal Clear bassist Keisuke Nishimoto was out of the country), the band happened to audition Kohsaku Mitani (the younger brother of Emerald Aisles guitarist Tetsuya Mitani, as he was also a member of that band).

As the months drew in that same year, the band regularly rehearsed and recorded the songs "Change My Heart" and "Holy Child" for the Make It Shine Vol. 2 compilation album, as well as playing "Over the Century" live for the video version of that album. The song "Change My Heart" in particular was distributed on its own on a cassette tape given to those who went to see the band play their first show on July 28, 1996. With great success, the band was signed to Mandrake Root Records, although Yoshioka had to withdraw from the band. According to a 1997 Burrn! interview, Shima claimed that Yoshioka left due to lacking interest in hard rock. He was replaced by former Fortbragg and Sqwier drummer Ichiro "VAL" Nagai for the band's debut album, Fragments of the Moon. However, upon completing the album, Harada left the band for personal reasons. For the tour in support of the album, the band used Masatoshi Taguchi as live support on keyboards until they landed a permanent replacement in Toshiyuki Koike later that year. Thanks to songs like "Alone in Paradise", "Holy Child", and "Take You to the Moon", the band's popularity was skyrocketing. That same year, the band participated in the cover of the Space Battleship Yamato theme with the release of "鋼鉄組曲 -宇宙より愛をこめて-" (translated as "Steel Suite -From Space with Love-") and went major by signing to VAP.

=== 1998–1999: Major label signing and Ozaki's departure ===
In 1998, the band released From Father to Son as their major debut. When touring in support of the album, they opened for Finnish power metal band Stratovarius, who had released Destiny that year. Music videos were released for "From Father to Son" and "The Last Betting" (originally a Zenith song that Ozaki composed). As the band continued enjoying their success in the scene, they returned in 1999 with the release of Rain Forest, which noted a slight change in direction as the band was eschewing their neoclassical roots in favor of more standard forms of hard rock and heavy metal. Nonetheless, Shima continued to write songs in similar veins as the albums before it, releasing a music video for "Time to Die", the album opener. However, tensions were growing between Shima and Ozaki as the situation was proving to be difficult to handle. In a 2007 interview with the online zine Metal Kings, Shima stated that Ozaki's voice was not strong enough for the style of music Concerto Moon played, and that he had more of a folk upbringing than a hard rock or heavy metal one. The band continued to play successful concerts throughout Japan that year, however, leading to the release of The End of the Beginning, their final live album with Ozaki (and with bonus track When the Moon Cries being their final studio involvement with him). In December 1999, Ozaki left the band, choosing not to continue working with Shima.

=== 2000–2004: Double Dealer and starting over with a new singer ===
As the new millennium drew in, Concerto Moon was in a very bad spot, due to dysfunctional relationships. As such, Shima put the band temporarily on hold, and with the help of VAP, he formed Double Dealer with Saber Tiger singer and personal friend Takenori Shimoyama. Joining along were Mitani and Koike from Concerto Moon and drummer Yoshio Isoda from Saber Tiger. This resulted in a direction more focused on bluesy 1970s and 1980s hard rock, and less similarities to Concerto Moon. With the release of their self-titled debut album in 2000, the band played select shows in Europe, due to the efforts of German record label Limb Music. Deride on the Top, their sophomore album, was released in 2001.

Double Dealer was put on hold when Shima decided to officially resurrect Concerto Moon, having played shows with the band in November 2000 with Takashi Inoue filling in as the band's next singer. Originally, Gate of Triumph, the first release since their hiatus was meant to be Shima's solo album, but the artist was changed to "Norifumi Shima with Concerto Moon" by VAP in order to influence sales. Although the album is mostly instrumental tracks, there are three original songs with Inoue's vocals, plus English-language versions of "Alone in Paradise" (changed to "Alone in the Paradise '01") and "Take You to the Moon" (changed to "Take You to the Moon '01"). Not long after, the band was tasked by the label with re-recording songs from their first four albums (including Gate of Triumph) to celebrate their fifth anniversary, and Destruction and Creation was released in 2002. However, Nagai left the band during the production cycle of the album to join Ark Storm, and his replacement was Junichi Sato (who would join Galneryus next year). Sato played on the last three songs off Destruction and Creation, two of them being original instrumentals and the third one being a remake of Crystal Clear song "Second War in Heaven" to close things off.

By 2002, the band was busy in the studio once again recording a proper followup to Gate of Triumph. In January 2003, Life on the Wire was released, and the band embarked on a successful tour that resulted in the release of a live album and video titled Live: Once in a Life Time. However, Sato was forced to leave Concerto Moon because Shima did not want him playing in other bands (he had just joined Galneryus in time to record their 2003 debut album, The Flag of Punishment). As such, Concerto Moon was out of a drummer yet again, and to further complicate things, Mitani also followed suit to pursue his own personal interests.

The band returned in 2004 with bassist Takanobu Kimoto (formerly of Precious and Babylon, and later to join Saber Tiger and Emerald Aisles) and drummer Shoichi Takeoka for their 2004 self-titled EP and After the Double Cross album that same year. However, issues continued to surface, and Shima put the band on hiatus again to revive Double Dealer (keeping Kimoto in Mitani's place) and release two more albums in 2005's Fate & Destiny and 2007's Desert of Lost Souls, plus the 2005 live album Live in Osaka.

=== 2007–2009: Rising from the ashes ===
After Double Dealer went on indefinite hiatus, Concerto Moon returned once again with 2008's Rise from Ashes. Replacing Takeoka was Masayuki Osada, Shima's old friend and bandmate from their Dior and Crystal Clear days (to make connections even more interesting, Osada has been Emerald Aisles' permanent drummer since 1998 when both he and Tetsuya Mitani left Moon Struck, and Osada and Inoue were in the band Blood IV in the mid-2000s, yielding two albums while Concerto Moon's activities were suspended). They had an opportunity to play in the United States for the first time, making their exclusive appearance at Bay Area Rock Festival in San Francisco, California.

Later that year, Shima released his first official solo album, From the Womb to the Tomb, which featured different singers and musicians (interestingly, Masatoshi "Sho" Ono would be featured, who was Yama-B's future replacement in Galneryus). Koike, too, had put out his only solo album titled Toshiyuki Koike's Exhibition, which was all-instrumental works with less guitars and more heavily into progressive rock styles (inspired by Emerson, Lake & Palmer).

In 2009, while touring in support of Rise from Ashes, Kimoto left the band, and Mitani had returned to fulfill his role on bass until a permanent replacement was decided on Toshiyuki Sugimori (who would later join D_Drive). Not only that, but Koike left the band that same year, leaving Concerto Moon without a permanent keyboard player for the time being (Blindman's keyboardist Hitoshi Endo would play on the band's subsequent albums).

=== 2010–2015: Return to indie labels and parting ways with Inoue ===
In 2010, the band switched back to indie labels and debuted Angel of Chaos on Triumph Records, which would be their mainstay label until 2015. However, due to a personal family situation, Inoue had to leave Concerto Moon in 2011, playing his final show with the band earlier that year (featured on the live release Live for Today, Hope for Tomorrow). Atsushi Kuze from Screaming Symphony was chosen as Inoue's replacement, and the band returned right away with the release of Savior Never Cry, which continued in the more abrasive style that Angel of Chaos had exhibited, forcing Shima to use more of his guitars to replace the parts that would've been played by a keyboardist. That was the result of Concerto Moon functioning as a four-piece, although they had live support for keyboards as the decade was unfolding.

In 2012, Sugimori left the band, and once again Mitani returned to play in support for the next two years, having laid down his tracks on 2013's Black Flame and touring throughout 2014 in support of the album. Aki joined as the band's next keyboardist. However, due to personal life situations, Osada left the band and was replaced by Atsushi "Tora" Kawatsuka, the former drummer of the band Onmyo-Za. As well, Shigeharu Nakayasu joined on the bass. Both Kawatsuka and Nakayasu remain current members of Concerto Moon.

In 2015, with the line-up restructured once more, the band switched from Triumph Records and released Between Life and Death on Katsusa Planning. This marked a more direct return to keyboards in Concerto Moon (although Black Flame had significant keyboard-laden tracks, as well).

=== 2016–2018: Tears of Messiah and another singer leaves ===
In 2017, the band was signed to Walküre Records. While preparing for their next album, Aki was arrested for fraud, which led Shima and the rest of the band to fire him. This led to hiring Terra Rosa keyboardist Masashi Okagaki to handle that duty on Tears of Messiah. For subsequent live performances, the band took in Ryo Miyake of Demon's Eye for support. In early 2018, Kuze announced that he would be leaving Concerto Moon, after seven years in the band. After playing his final live shows with Concerto Moon, Kuze bid the band farewell and continued on with visual kei power metal band Jupiter.

In the summer of 2018, Shima announced Concerto Moon's new line-up. Valthus singer Wataru Haga was officially made the next Concerto Moon frontman, and Miyake's status from live support was upgraded to permanent band member. The band continued touring with this new line-up to promote their new sound.

=== 2019–present: Returning to the early roots with Ouroboros and Rain Fire ===
With the ongoing support of Walküre Records, Concerto Moon decided to re-record songs from their first six albums. Due to Haga's vocal style closely resembling Ozaki's, Shima wanted to take Concerto Moon back to their early years when they were melodic and less heavy. In 2019, the band released Ouroboros, and with it came a music video for "Change My Heart" (one of the band's earliest songs).

In 2020, due to the COVID-19 pandemic, the band was forced to suspend live activities, but they continued to collaborate on the making of the successor to Tears of Messiah. In December 2020, the band released Rain Fire, which consists of all original songs composed to match both Haga and Miyake in style. In 2021, as the pandemic was calming down awhile, the band started playing more shows again, and they released the EP Waiting for You during the summer.

In 2022, Concerto Moon played shows in celebration of twenty-five years since Fragments of the Moon was released, and in 2023, they gave From Father to Son the same treatment.

== Members ==
=== Current ===
- Norifumi Shima – guitar (1996–present)
- Shigeharu Nakayasu – bass (2015–present)
- Atsushi Kawatsuka – drums (2015–present)
- Ryo Miyake – keyboards (2018–present)
- Keiichi – vocals (2026–present)

=== Former ===
- Takao Ozaki – vocals (1996–1999)
- Osamu Harada – keyboards (1996–1997)
- Nobuho Yoshioka – drums (1996)
- Kohsaku Mitani – bass (1996–2003; touring 2009, 2012–2014)
- Ichiro Nagai – drums (1997–2001)
- Toshiyuki Koike – keyboards (1998–2009)
- Takashi Inoue – vocals (2000–2011)
- Junichi Sato – drums (2001–2004)
- Takanobu Kimoto – bass (2003–2009)
- Shoichi Takeoka – drums (2004)
- Masayuki Osada – drums (2007–2015)
- Toshiyuki Sugimori – bass (2009–2012)
- Aki – keyboards (2015–2017; 2013–2014 touring)
- Atsushi Kuze – vocals (2011–2018)
- Wataru Haga – vocals (2018-2026)

== Discography ==
=== Studio albums ===
- Fragments of the Moon (1997)
- From Father to Son (1998)
- Rain Forest (1999)
- Gate of Triumph (2001)
- Destruction and Creation (self-cover album, 2002)
- Life on the Wire (2003)
- After the Double Cross (2004)
- Decade of the Moon (Boxed set, 2008)
- Rise from Ashes (2008)
- Angel of Chaos (2010)
- Savior Never Cry (2011)
- Black Flame (2013)
- Between Life and Death (2015)
- Tears of Messiah (2017)
- Ouroboros (self-cover album, 2019)
- Rain Fire (2020)

=== EPs ===
- Time to Die (1999)
- Concerto Moon (2004)
- Live and Rare (2014)
- Waiting for You (2021)

=== Live albums ===
- Live Concerto (1997)
- The End of the Beginning (1999)
- Live: Once in a Life Time (2003)
- Live for Today, Hope for Tomorrow (2011)
- Prologue to Messiah Tour 2017 (2018)
- Between Live and Death [Live 2025] (2026)

=== Videos ===
- Live Concerto: The Movie (VHS, 1998) (DVD, 2008)
- Live The End of the Beginning (VHS, 2000) (DVD, 2003)
- Live: Once in a Life Time (DVD, 2003)
- Live from Ashes (DVD, 2009)
- Savior Never Cry Tour 2011 (DVD, 2011)
- Attack of the Double Axemen Vol. 2 (DVD, 2012)
- Between Life and Death Tour 2015 (DVD, 2015)
- Prologue to Messiah Tour 2017 (DVD, 2018)
- Road to Ouroboros〜Live Compilation 2019 Spring〜 (DVD, 2019)
- Rain Fire Tour 2021 (DVD, 2022)
