= Double Deal =

Double Deal may refer to:

- Double Deal (1939 film), an American drama with an all-black cast
- Double Deal (1950 film), an American crime drama film
- Double Deal (1983 film), an Australian film
