= Double Dealer =

Japanese band

- Origin: Japan
- Genres: Hard rock, power metal, neo-classical metal
- Years active: 2000–2001, 2005-2007
- Label: VAP
- Members: Takenori Shimoyama; Norifumi Shima; Toshiyuki Koike; Yoshio Isoda; Takanobu Kimoto
- Past members: Kosaku Mitani

Double Dealer (ダブル・ディーラー, daburu dhīrā) was a Japanese hard rock/power metal band formed by Takenori Shimoyama (Sixride, ex-Saber Tiger) and Norifumi Shima (Concerto Moon) in 2000. They toured France in the same year as an opening act of Symphony X. They had two albums that charted on the Oricon Albums Chart, with their second record, Deride At The Top, reaching their highest ranking at 26. Double Dealer's activity was suspended intermittently, and indefinitely stopped in July 2007.

== Band members ==
=== Current members ===
- Takenori Shimoyama - Vocals
- Norifumi Shima - Guitar
- Toshiyuki Koike - Keyboard
- Takanobu Kimoto - Bass
- Yoshio Isoda - Drums

=== Former members ===
- Kosaku Mitani - Bass

== Discography ==
=== Albums ===
- Double Dealer (2000)
- Deride At The Top (2001)
- Fate & Destiny (2005)
- Desert Of Lost Souls (2007)

=== Live albums ===
- Fate & Destiny Tour 2005 Live In Osaka (2006)

=== DVD releases ===
- Fate & Destiny Tour 2005 Live In Tokyo (2006)
