= Masatoshi Ono =

Japanese singer

Masatoshi Ono 小野 正利
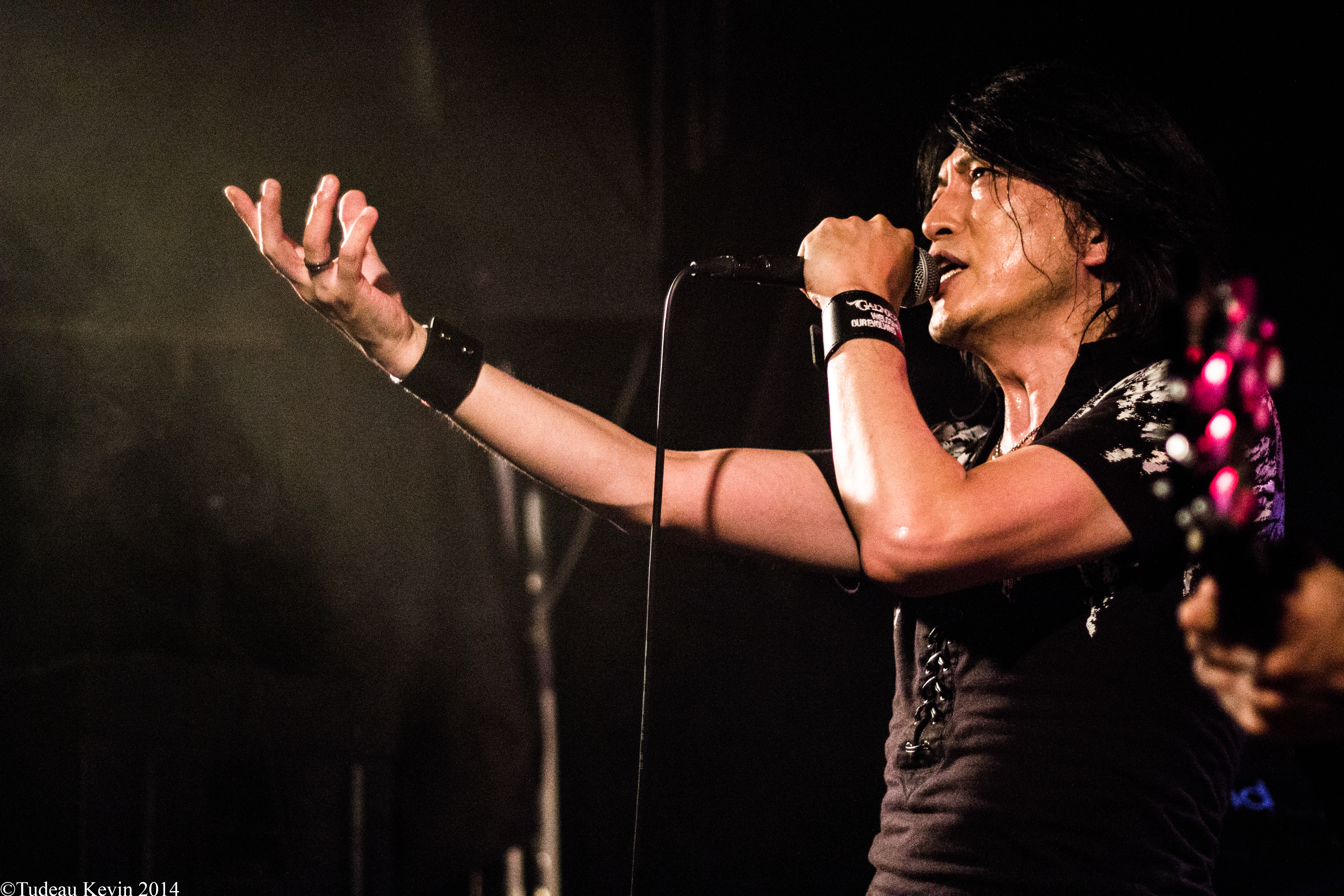

Background information
- Also known as: Sho
- Born: January 29, 1967 (age 59); Adachi, Tokyo, Japan
- Genres: Heavy metal, power metal, neoclassical metal, J-pop
- Occupation: Singer-songwriter
- Instruments: Vocals, guitar, piano
- Years active: 1980–present
- Labels: Sony, VAP, Shibuya Television, Warner Music Japan
- Website: onomasatoshi.com Vocal school ~Bese~ Youtube Channel

Masatoshi Ono (小野 正利, Ono Masatoshi; born January 29, 1967 in Adachi, Tokyo, Japan), also known as Sho, is a Japanese rock/heavy metal singer-songwriter and vocal coach. Ono got his start in the 1980s as vocalist of the heavy metal band Fort Bragg. In 1992, he released his first solo single, "Pure ni Nare", on Sony Records. It was not until his third single, "You're the Only...", that he began to receive notable attention. The single helped Ono win the "Rookie of the Year" award at the 34th Japan Record Awards and an invitation to that year's Kōhaku Uta Gassen. In 2018, readers and professional musicians voted him the tenth best vocalist in the history of hard rock and heavy metal in We Rock magazine's "Metal General Election".

In 2009, Ono became the vocalist of the power metal band Galneryus. His first single in eight years, "Departure!", was used as the opening theme song for the 2011 Hunter × Hunter anime. "Departure! -Second Version-" was used as the series' second opening theme, with Galneryus' "Hunting for Your Dream" as the second ending theme. Ono sings "Fight It Out!!", the opening theme song for the international versions of the final arc of Dragon Ball Kai.

In 2010 he established his own vocal school "Bese".

== Discography ==
=== Studio albums ===
- [1992.09.09] Voice of Heart
- [1993.04.02] Mono
- [1993.12.12] With All My Heart
- [1994.11.21] Tenderness
- [1996.08.01] X Cross
- [1997.12.17] Fragments
- [2003.05.21] Rebirth
- [2004.11.24] Fuyu Iro Monogatari ~Winter Stories~ (冬色物語～Winter Stories～)

=== Compilation albums ===
- [1994.06.01] For Pure Lovers
- [1995.10.21] The Best Single Selection
- [2008.11.26] Golden Best Masatoshi Ono

=== Singles ===
- [1992.05.21] "Pure ni Nare" (ピュアになれ)
- [1992.06.21] "Niji ~Roku de Nashi Blue~" (虹〜ろくでなしBLUES〜)
- [1992.08.01] "You're the Only..." Oricon Singles No.02
- [1992.11.01] "Fly Away"
- [1993.02.21] "Forever My Love"
- [1993.05.21] "Motto Utsukushikure" (もっと美しくなれ)
- [1993.11.21] "Believe"
- [1994.10.21] "Mou Ichido Kimi ga Hoshii" (もう一度 君が欲しい)
- [1995.07.21] "Itsu ni Ma ni ka Kimi wo" (いつにまにか君を)
- [1995.08.21] "Kirei da ne" (キレイだね)
- [1995.10.01] "Itsu ni Ma ni ka Kimi wo (Acoustic Version)" (いつのまにか君を(アコースティック・バージョン))
- [1996.03.25] "Futari Dake no Stories" (二人だけのSTORIES)
- [1996.05.22] "Kimi ni Kita Natsu" (君にきた夏)
- [1996.06.21] "Loving You"
- [1997.06.25] "Sympathy"
- [1997.11.26] "Nani ga Ima Boku ni Dekiru Darou" (なにがいま僕にできるだろう)
- [1999.02.01] "Heart"
- [1999.11.20] "Feeling" (with Yōko Oginome)
- [2000.12.22] "White Night"
- [2003.11.19] "I Wish ~ I Hope"
- [2011.12.21] "Departure!"
- [2014.07.16] "Knock on Your Gate!"

=== Other ===
- [2011.10.05] The Voice -Stand Proud!-
1. "Lady of Winter" – Crimson Glory
2. "Spotlight Kid" – Rainbow
3. "Tonight I'm Falling" – TNT
4. "Rock 'n' Roll Children" – Dio
5. "Mighty Wings" – Cheap Trick
6. "Never Surrender" – Lion
7. "Angel Don't Cry" – Toto
8. "Stranded" – Airplay
9. "Fool for Your Loving" – Whitesnake
10. "I Want Out" – Helloween
11. "Lovedrive" – Scorpions
12. "Open Arms" – Journey

Personnel

- Sho – vocals on all tracks
- Yuhki (Galneryus) – keyboards on all tracks except 11
- Syu (Galneryus, Spinalchord, Animetal) – guitar on tracks 2, 3, 5, 7, 9 & 10
- Taka (Galneryus) – bass on tracks 1, 2, 3, 6, 7 & 9
- Junichi (Galneryus, Spinalchord, ex:Concerto Moon) – drums on tracks 1, 3, 6 & 7
- Katsuji Kirita (Animetal, Gargoyle, The Cro-Magnons) – drums on tracks 2, 4, 5, 9, 10 & 11
- Kentaro (Gargoyle) – guitar on tracks 4 & 11
- Toshi (Gargoyle) – bass on tracks 4 & 11
- Masaki (Canta, Animetal, Zigoku Quartet) – bass on tracks 5, 8, 10 & 12
- Luke Takamura (Canta, Seikima-II) – guitar on tracks 8 & 12
- Raiden Yuzawa (Canta, Seikima-II) – drums on tracks 8 & 12
- Shinichi Kobayashi (Zigoku Guartet) – guitar on tracks 1, 6 & 9
- [2015.02.10] Dragon Ball Kai: "Fight It Out!!" & "Let It Burn"

== Videos ==
- [1992.12.12] Voice of Heart
- [1993.10.01] Live in Voice III Tour
- [1995.11.22] The Single Selection
- [2003.2] Rebirth ~10th Anniversary~
- [2009.10] Masatoshi Ono Birthday Live @ Duo Music Exchange

Preceded by Mi-Ke	Japan Record Award for Best New Artist; 1992	Succeeded by Yasuhiro Yamane
