= Syu =

Japanese musician

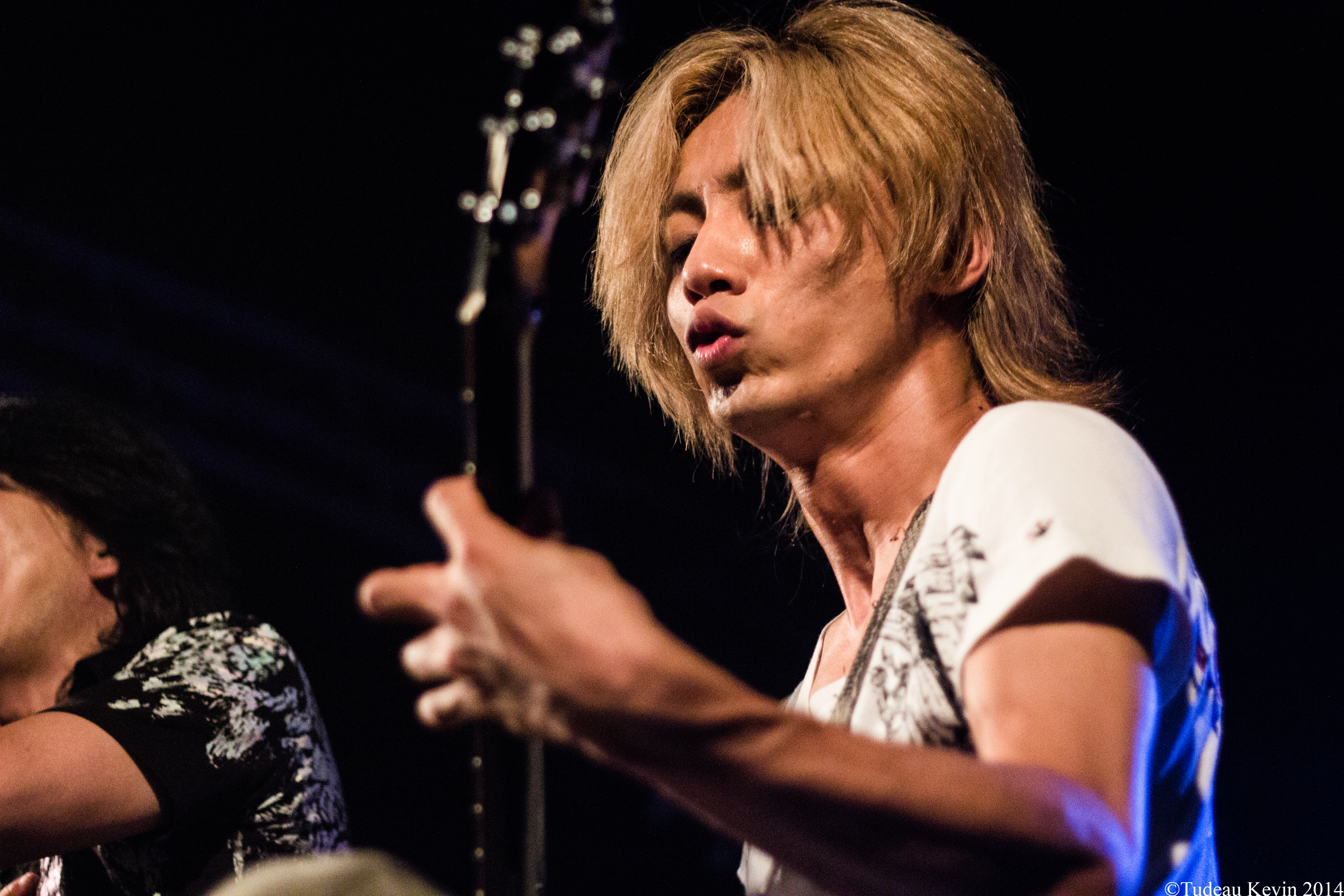
- Syu performing with Galneryus in 2014

Background information
- Also known as: Syu
- Born: September 23, 1980 (age 45); Ashiya, Hyōgo Prefecture, Japan
- Genres: Power metal, neo-classical metal, thrash metal
- Occupations: Musician, songwriter
- Instruments: Guitar, vocals
- Years active: 1996–present
- Labels: HPQ, VAP, Warner Music Japan
- Member of: Galneryus, Animetal
- Website: Official website

Syu (Japanese: シュウ, Hepburn: Shū) is a Japanese musician, best known as the leader and guitarist of the power metal band Galneryus. He also performs guitar and lead vocals in Spinalcord (formerly known as Aushvitz) and guitar in Animetal. Under his own name, Syu has released one studio album, one cover album and one instrumental album, each featuring collaborations with many guest musicians. He was voted the Best Guitarist in online music magazine Beeast's music awards four years in a row, from 2015 to 2018. In 2018, readers and professional musicians voted Syu the fourth best guitarist in the history of hard rock and heavy metal in We Rock magazine's "Metal General Election". His work on Galneryus' song "Emotions" was named the 73rd best guitar instrumental by Young Guitar Magazine in 2019.

== Early life ==
With parents who played the piano, Syu started playing the instrument at the age of four, but soon stopped. He then started playing the violin at age six, and continued to do so until he was 12 or 13 years old. In fourth grade of elementary school, he discovered X Japan and dove into rock music. With Yoshiki his favorite member, Syu started to play drums alongside violin. He played the drums in a band called Cross-Large, but could not find good musicians to play with. He switched to guitar after finding it easier because guitar and violin are relatively similar. He also said he could better express himself through guitar than through drums.

== Career ==
Syu joined the visual kei band Valkyr in August 1998, nearly a year later they released their first demo tape, titled "Love of Insanity". In August 2000, they released a "making of" VHS. In 2001 they finally released their first single, "Batta". After releasing 5 demos, a single and a VHS, the band broke up on April 24, 2002. When Valkyr broke up, Syu formed the bands Galneryus and Aushvitz with its remaining members.

While at a live house in Kujō, Osaka, Syu heard fellow Kansai-native Yama-B on the radio and knew that he wanted to work with him. Galneryus formed in 2001 with only Syu and Yama-B as official members. Valkyr keyboardist A was one of their support musicians. In 2002, they signed to VAP and began work on their first full-length album titled The Flag of Punishment. In 2008 they released their fifth album Reincarnation, which became their last with Yama-B as he left amicably due to musical differences. Yama-B was replaced by Masatoshi "Sho" Ono and in 2010 Galneryus released their sixth full-length album, aptly titled Resurrection.

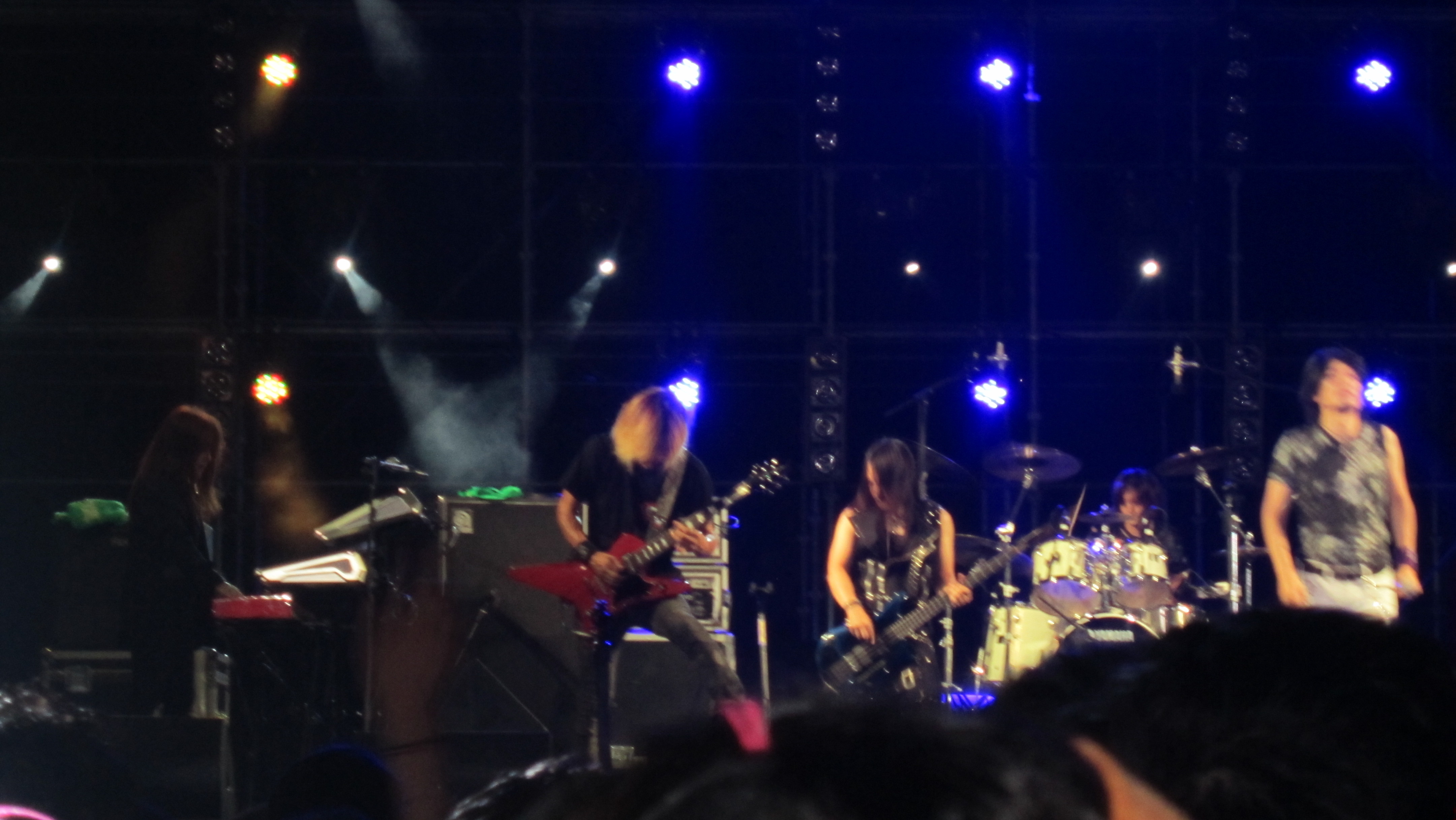
Syu (second from left) performing with Galneryus at the Busan Rock Festival, 2012

Visual kei band Aushvitz was formed in 2002 with Syu on guitar and vocals and his Valkyr bandmate Kyoichi on bass. They released their first single, "Akarui" (赤涙), in September of that year. It is with Aushvitz that Syu was free to do what he wanted to musically, and they had a theme of "violence, hardness, and extreme sorrow". He chose the name Aushvitz, a reference to the Auschwitz concentration camp, with the "hope it won't happen again" and wanting to "express my heart-rending feelings" and the members wore prison uniforms. In 2006, Galneryus drummer Jun-ichi joined. Although Syu announced in June 2006 that they would be changing their name with their next release, it was not until 2008 that the new name, Spinalcord, was unveiled and the single, "The Spinalcord", was released. They released their first album, Remember Me'Til Your Dying Day, on September 23, 2009. When asked about the future of Spinalcord in 2017, Syu expressed dissatisfaction with his vocals at the time, but said if he could achieve a quality of singing that would allow him to perform for an audience, he would like to.

In 2003, Syu joined the Eizo Sakamoto-led Animetal as their new guitarist and moved from Osaka to Tokyo. He joined at the suggestion of producer Yorimasa Hisatake. He recorded four albums with them before they went on indefinite hiatus in 2006.

On September 29, 2010, Syu released a cover album on HPQ titled Crying Stars -Stand Proud!-, covering songs from the 1980s and 1990s by Racer X, Yngwie Malmsteen, Arch Enemy and more. It features many guests including his Galneryus and Spinalcord bandmates, Eizo Sakamoto, and other well-known musicians like Panther. In 2014 Syu composed the music for "Biran no Kaze" (毘藍ノ風), which Ryuji Aoki sang as the opening theme song for the anime adaptation of Laughing Under the Clouds.

Syu contributed significantly to the first solo album by Rami, 2016's Aspiration. Vap released Syu's instrumental solo album You Play Hard on November 9, 2016. It features Katsuji (Animetal, Gargoyle) and Yasuhiro Mizuno (Saber Tiger) in addition to Galneryus members. Syu's album Vorvados was released on January 23, 2019, by Warner Music Japan. It features collaborations with guest vocalists such as Fuki (Unlucky Morpheus), Sono (Matenrou Opera) and Dancho (Nogod), and English musician Jacky Vincent. In 2020, Syu was one of many metal musicians from around the world who contributed to a cover of Deep Purple's "Burn" for the Metal For Kids United charity organization.

After 20 years, Animetal reunited for a 30th anniversary tour in 2026.

== Style and influences ==
Syu has said that "all progressive- and symphonic metal guitarists have influenced my work" and that he has too many guitar influences to list. Some he has named include Ulrich Roth, Michael Schenker, Yngwie Malmsteen, Paul Gilbert, John Petrucci, and Gary Moore. He has also stated that hide and X influenced him greatly, and that he really liked Luna Sea "in their prime". Lovebites guitarist Midori has cited Syu as one of her guitar influences and said he has a uniquely Japanese style of playing.

When composing music and trying to decide which of his projects the song will go to, Syu said he imagines the vocalist's voice and whether or not it matches the song. Syu stated that a song must still be good even when stripped down to just vocals and piano. The guitarist has also said that while he wants to stand out, the vocalist should stand out the most.

== Equipment ==
Syu has a signature series of guitars available from ESP Guitars.

== Discography ==
=== Solo ===
- Crying Stars -Stand Proud!- (September 29, 2010, cover album), Oricon Albums Chart Peak Position: No. 91
- You Play Hard (November 9, 2016, instrumental album) No. 43
- Vorvados (January 23, 2019) No. 24

=== With Spinalcord ===
- Remember Me 'til Your Dying Day (2009)

=== With Animetal ===
- Animetal Marathon V (2003)
- Animetal Marathon VI (2004)
- Animetal Marathon VII (2005)
- Decade of Bravehearts (2006)

== See also ==
- List of musical artists from Japan
