= The Yellow Monkey discography =

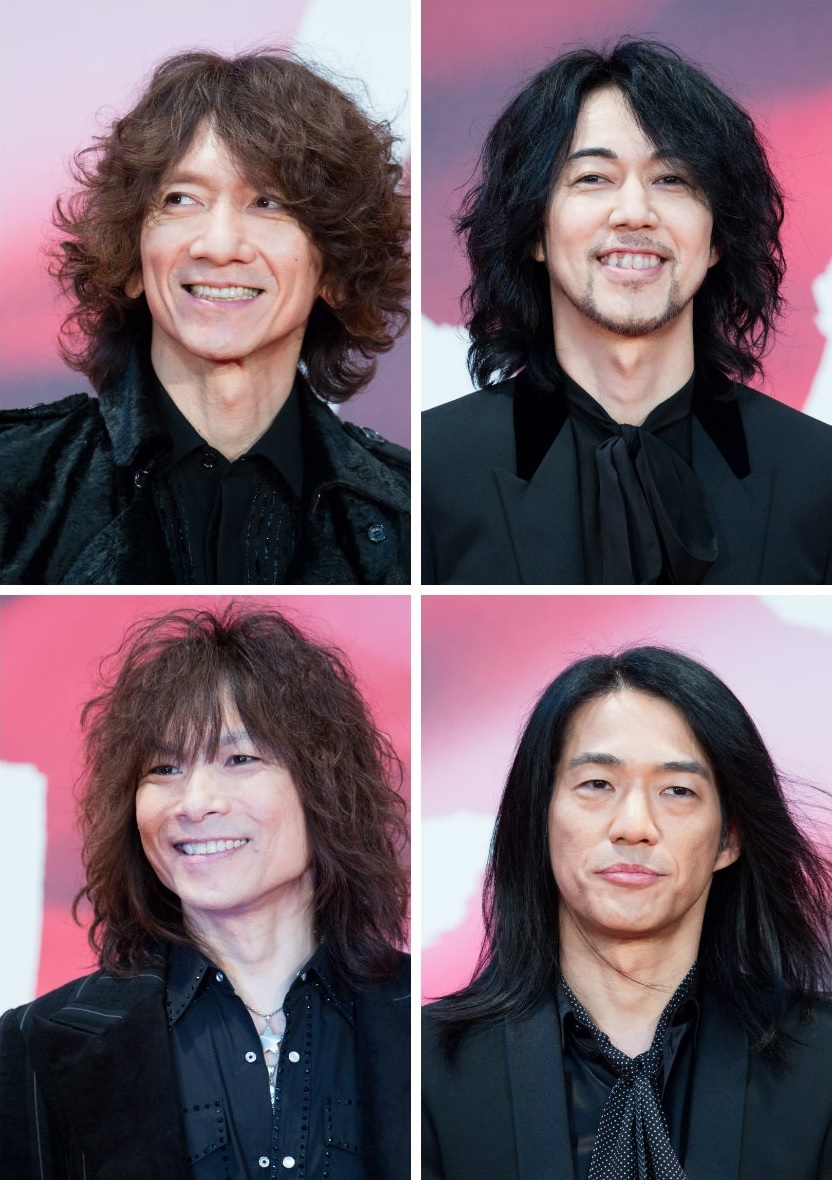
- The Yellow Monkey at the Tokyo International Film Festival on October 25, 2017.
- Studio albums: 11
- Live albums: 2
- Compilation albums: 9
- Tribute albums: 1
- Singles: 26
- Box sets: 1

The Yellow Monkey's discography consists of 11 studio albums, (Note: Generally counted by the band as 10, as they exclude the independent album Bunched Birth.) 9 compilation albums, 2 live albums, and 26 singles.

The Yellow Monkey is a Japanese rock band formed in 1989 by Kazuya Yoshii (vocals), Hideaki Kikuchi (guitar), Youichi Hirose (bass), and Eiji Kikuchi (drums). Their first album, Bunched Birth (1991), was released by indie label Engine. They went major with their second album, The Night Snails and Plastic Boogie (1992), which was followed by Jaguar Hard Pain (1994). In 1995, they achieved national success with the release of Smile, followed by Four Seasons. Their next album, Sicks (1997), was also released in the United Kingdom. They returned to the United Kingdom shortly thereafter to record their next album, Punch Drunkard (1998), which was followed by what would be their last album before they disbanded, 8 (2000). The Yellow Monkey went on hiatus in 2001 and officially split up in 2004. However, the band reunited in 2016 and released the album 9999 in 2019, which won awards at the Space Shower Music Awards and Japan Record Awards. It was followed by Sparkle X in 2024.

== Studio albums ==
Title	Details	Peak position		RIAJ
Title	Details	Oricon	Billboard Japan	RIAJ
Engine (indies)
Bunched Birth	July 21, 1991	40 (Note: 1996 reissue only)	—	—
TRIAD (Columbia Records)
The Night Snails and Plastic Boogie	June 21, 1991	79	—	—
Experience Movie	March 1, 1993	80	—	—
Jaguar Hard Pain	March 1, 1994	28	—	—
Smile	February 1, 1995	4	5	Gold
Four Seasons	November 1, 1995	1	8	Platinum
FUNHOUSE (BMG)
Sicks	January 22, 1997	1	1	Platinum
Punch Drunkard	March 4, 1998	1	2	2x Platinum
8	July 26, 2000	2	3	Platinum
Atlantic Records
9999	April 17, 2019	2 (Note: Oricon combines April 2019's 9999 and December 2019's expanded version 9999+1 together. Thus it lists 9999 as reaching number 2 on December 16, 2019. However, that was actually 9999+1.)	3	Gold
Sparkle X	May 29, 2024	1	3	—
"—" indicates that the recording did not appear on this chart or was not certified.

== Compilation albums ==
Title	Details	Peak position		RIAJ
Title	Details	Oricon	Billboard Japan	RIAJ
Triad Years Act I ~ The Very Best of The Yellow Monkey	December 7, 1996	2	2	3x Million
Triad Years Act II ~ The Very Best of The Yellow Monkey	April 19, 1997	2	3	Platinum
The Yellow Monkey Single Collection	December 10, 1998	10	13	Gold
Triad Years Act I & Act II ~ The Very Best of The Yellow Monkey	March 1, 2001	25	—	
Golden Years Singles 1996-2001	June 13, 2001	2	2	Platinum
Mother of All The Best	December 8, 2004	5	5	Platinum
Yemon -Fan's Best Selection- (イエモン-FAN'S BEST SELECTION-)	July 31, 2013	2	—	
The Yellow Monkey is Here. New Best	May 21, 2017	1	—	Platinum
"—" indicates that the recording did not appear on this chart or was not certified.

== Live albums ==
Title	Details	Peak position		RIAJ
Title	Details	Oricon	Billboard Japan	RIAJ
So Alive	May 26, 1999	3	4	Gold
Live Loud	February 3, 2021	1	—	—

== Tribute albums ==
- This Is for You ~ The Yellow Monkey Tribute Album (December 9, 2009), Oricon peak position: 6

== Box sets ==
- Triad Complete Box (December 10, 1997), Oricon peak position: 14, Billboard Japan peak position: 13

== Singles ==
Title	Release	Peak position		RIAJ	Album
Title	Release	Oricon	Billboard Japan	RIAJ	Album
"Romantist Taste"	May 21, 1992	—			The Night Snails and Plastic Boogie
"Avant-garde de ikou yo" (アバンギャルドで行こうよ)	March 1, 1993	—			Experience Movie
"Kanashiki Asian Boy" (悲しきASIAN BOY)	February 21, 1994	97	—	—	Jaguar Hard Pain
"Nettaiya" (熱帯夜)	July 21, 1994	59	—	—	Smile
"Love Communication"	January 21, 1994	29	—	—	Smile
"Nageku Nari Waga Yoru no Fantasy" (嘆くなり我が夜のFantasy)	March 1, 1995	34	—	—	Smile
"Tsuioku no Mermaid" (追憶のマーメイド)	July 21, 1994	19	—	—	Four Seasons
"Taiyō ga Moete iru" (太陽が燃えている)	September 30, 1995	9	—	Gold	Four Seasons
"Jam/Tactics"	February 29, 1996	6	7	Platinum	Four Seasons
"Spark"	July 10, 1996	3	2	Gold	Non-album single
"Rakuen" (楽園)	November 15, 1996	3	4	Platinum	Sicks
"Love Love Show"	April 19, 1997	4	4	Platinum	Punch Drunkard
"Burn"	July 24, 1997	2	3	Platinum	Punch Drunkard
"Kyūkon" (球根)	February 4, 1998	1	2	Platinum	Punch Drunkard
"Hanarenu na" (離れるな)	June 3, 1998	15	12	—	Punch Drunkard
"Sugar Fix"	August 21, 1998	5	9	—	Non-album single
"My Winding Road"	October 21, 1998	5	6	Gold	8
"So Young"	March 3, 1990	5	4	—	8
"Barairo no Hibi" (バラ色の日々)	December 8, 1999	4	4	Gold	8
"Seinaru Umi to Sunshine" (聖なる海とサンシャイン)	January 26, 2000	9	11	—	8
"Shock Hearts"	April 5, 2000	3	4	—	8
"Pearl" (パール)	July 12, 2000	6	6	—	8
"Brilliant World"	November 1, 2000	5	4	—	Non-album single
"Primal" (プライマル)	January 31, 2001	3	8	—	Non-album single
"Suna no Tō" (砂の塔)	October 19, 2016	2	—	Gold	9999
"Cat City"	July 9, 2025	3	—	—	Non-album single
"—" indicates that the recording did not appear on this chart, or the position could not be found, or it was not certified.

=== Other singles ===
- "Alright" (February 12, 2017, fan club only)
- "Rosanna" ("Roseana") (ロザーナ; March 17, 2017, fan club only)
- "Ziggy Stardust" (September 13, 2017, Amazon.co.jp only)
- "Stars" (October 27, 2017)
- "Horizon" (November 29, 2017)
- "Ladybug" ("Tentomushi") (天道虫, Tentōmushi; November 9, 2018), Oricon Digital Singles Chart Peak Position: No.11
- "I Don't Know" (January 25, 2019) No.19, also No. 42 on 2019 year-end for Tokio Hot 100
- "Dandan" (October 30, 2019) No.7
- "Mirai wa Minaide" (未来はみないで; March 13, 2020, 30th Anniversary Memorial Gift) No.6
- "Hotel Neutrino" (ホテルニュートリノ; January 1, 2024) No.16
- "Shine On" (April 3, 2024) No.24

== Home videos ==
- Life Time - Screen ~Tsuioku no Ginmaku~ (life Time・SCREEN〜追憶の銀幕〜; September 1, 1993)
- Cherry Blossom Revolution -Live at Budokan- (July 21, 1995)
- Clips Video Collection 1992〜1996 (March 30, 1996)
- True Mind Tour '95-'96 For Season: In Motion (October 21, 1996)
- Blue Film (November 1, 1997)
- Red Tape (December 3, 1997)
- Purple Disc (December 17, 1997)
- Mekara Uroko - 7 (メカラ ウロコ・7; October 21, 1998)
- Clips 2 Video Collection 1996〜1998 (November 18, 1998)
- Punch Drunkard Tour 1998/99 Final 3.10 Yokohama Arena (PUNCH DRUNKARD TOUR 1998/99 FINAL 3.10 横浜アリーナ; June 23, 1999)
- Jaguar Hard Pain Live '94 (December 10, 1999)
- Spring Tour (December 9, 2000), Oricon DVDs Chart Peak Position: No.25
- Clips 3 Video Collection 1999〜2001 (March 14, 2001) No.11
- The Yellow Monkey Clip Box (December 8, 2004) No.9
- The Yellow Monkey Live Box (December 8, 2004) No.15
- The Yellow Monkey Live at Tokyo Dome (December 28, 2004) No.13
- Empire Live The Yellow Monkey (ライブ帝国 THE YELLOW MONKEY; December 23, 2005) No.82
- Mekara Uroko - Live DVD-Box (メカラ ウロコ・LIVE DVD-BOX; December 9, 2009) No.6
- True Mind "Naked" - Tour '96 "For Season" at Nippon Budokan (TRUE MIND “NAKED” -TOUR '96 “FOR SEASON” at 日本武道館-; October 21, 2012) No.161
- True Mind "Naked" - Tour '96 For Season "Proof of the Wild" at NHK Hall (TRUE MIND “NAKED” -TOUR '96 FOR SEASON “野性の証明” at NHKホール-; October 21, 2012) No.241
- True Mind "Naked" (October 21, 2012) No.4
- Red Tape "Naked" (December 3, 2012) No.5
- Pandora: The Yellow Monkey Punch Drunkard Tour The Movie (パンドラ ザ・イエロー・モンキー PUNCH DRUNKARD TOUR THE MOVIE; December 4, 2013) No.7, Oricon Blu-rays Chart Peak Position: No.102
- The Yellow Monkey Super Japan Tour 2016 -Saitama Super Arena 2016.7.10- (October 19, 2016) No.1, No.1
- The Yellow Monkey Live Box (March 21, 2018) No.13
- Ototoki (Vibration) (オトトキ; March 28, 2018) No.40, No.3 (deluxe), 143 (regular)
- The Yellow Monkey Super Big Egg 2017 (August 2, 2019) No.3, No.4
- The Yellow Monkey 30th Anniversary Live -Dome Special- 2020.11.3 (March 10, 2021) No.21, No.35
- 30th Anniversary The Yellow Monkey Super Dome Tour Box (March 10, 2021) No.4, No.2
- Spring Tour "Naked" (May 11, 2022) No.3
- The Yellow Monkey Super Japan Tour 2019 -Grateful Spoonful- Complete Box (July 20, 2022) No.3
- The Yellow Monkey Super Big Egg 2024 "Shine On" (October 9, 2024) No.7, No.10
- Clips 4 (November 12, 2025)

== Video games ==
- Perfect Performer: The Yellow Monkey (July 1, 1999, PlayStation)
- The Yellow Monkey: Trancemission VJ Remix (April 14, 2000, PlayStation)
