= Chōzetsu Dynamic! =

2015 single by Kazuya Yoshii

"Chōzetsu☆Dynamic!"
- Standard edition cover, featuring characters from Dragon Ball Super

Single by Kazuya Yoshii
- Language: Japanese
- B-side: "Romantic Ageru yo"
- Released: October 7, 2015
- Studio: Capitol, U.S.; Mikan, Japan
- Genre: Rock
- Length: 3:36
- Label: Triad/Nippon Columbia
- Composer: Kazuya Yoshii
- Lyricist: Yukinojo Mori
- Producer: Kazuya Yoshii

Kazuya Yoshii singles chronology
"Clear" (2015)	"Chōzetsu☆Dynamic!" (2015)

"Chōzetsu☆Dynamic!" (Japanese: 超絶☆ダイナミック！, Hepburn: Chōzetsu☆Dainamikku; lit. 'Excellent☆Dynamic!', written in English as "Cho-Zets☆Dynamic!") is the fourteenth single by Japanese rock musician Kazuya Yoshii, released by Triad/Nippon Columbia on October 7, 2015. Composed and produced by Yoshii, with lyrics written by Yukinojo Mori, it is the first opening theme song of the Dragon Ball Super anime series. The single reached number 13 on both the Oricon Singles Chart and Billboard Japan's Hot 100.

== Background and recording ==
Kazuya Yoshii composed the music for "Chōzetsu☆Dynamic!", while its lyrics were penned by Yukinojo Mori, who has written numerous songs for the Dragon Ball franchise. Yoshii said he wanted a melody that children could hum on their way home from school and to express his image of Goku, which he described as kindness and great strength with a hint of sexiness. The song was recorded in Los Angeles with American musicians Alain Johannes, Chris Chaney and Josh Freese. "Chōzetsu☆Dynamic!" was used as the opening theme song for the first 76 episodes of the Dragon Ball Super anime.

The single also includes a cover of "Romantic Ageru yo", the closing theme of the original Dragon Ball anime, instrumental versions of these two songs, and an English-language version of the title track. Yoshii's The Yellow Monkey bandmate, Hideaki Kikuchi, performs guitar on "Romantic Ageru yo".

== Release ==
"Chōzetsu☆Dynamic!" was released on October 7, 2015. The limited edition of the single has slightly different cover art and comes with a DVD that includes the music videos for "Chōzetsu☆Dynamic!" and Yoshii's previous single "Clear", as well as two versions of the video for "(Everybody is) Like a Starlight". The TV edited version of the song, "Chōzetsu☆Dynamic! (TV Size)" (超絶☆ダイナミック!（TVサイズ）), was previously released digitally on July 5, 2015.

"Chōzetsu☆Dynamic!" was later included on Yoshii's 2023 compilation album, 20.

== Music videos ==
The music video for "Chōzetsu☆Dynamic!" was directed by Masakazu Fukatsu and features Yoshii performing and playing roulette in a casino. A music video for the English version of the song was released on October 7, 2022, the seventh anniversary of the single, to commemorate 10 million streams of the Japanese version. It features young athletes practicing basketball, skateboarding, soccer, and dance.

== Reception ==
Tomoko Imai of Rockin'On called the title track fresh and wide-ranging to appeal to fans of Dragon Ball and express Yoshii's own style. She described the track as a mix of standard rock and Galápagos-style music. Fanplus Music's Yuichi Hirayama cited the song's catchy guitar intro, which he compared to those heard in Kenji Sawada's "Kiken na Futari" and Hide's "Rocket Dive", as its greatest feature, writing that it excites listeners from the very beginning and builds anticipation for Goku's upcoming adventures. Imai praised the single's cover of "Romantic Ageru yo", particularly how Yoshii made use of the "pop flavor" of the 1986 original.

== Track listing ==
No.	Title	Lyrics	Music	Length
1.	"Chōzetsu☆Dynamic!" (超絶☆ダイナミック！, 'Excellent☆Dynamic!')	Yukinojo Mori	Kazuya Yoshii	3:36
2.	"Romantic Ageru yo" (ロマンティックあげるよ, 'I'll Give You Romance')	Takemi Yoshida	Takeshi Ike	3:56
3.	"Cho-Zets☆Dynamic!"	Yukinojo Mori, EMI K. Lynn (English translation)	Kazuya Yoshii	3:36
4.	"Chōzetsu☆Dynamic! -Instrumental-"		Kazuya Yoshii	3:36
5.	"Romantic Ageru yo -Instrumental-"		Takeshi Ike	3:56
Total length:				18:40

Limited edition DVD
No.	Title	Length
1.	"Clear" (クリア)
2.	"(Everybody is) Like a Starlight"
3.	"(Everybody is) Like a Starlight -Silhouette Ver.-" ((Everybody is) Like a Starlight -シルエット Ver.-)
4.	"Chōzetsu☆Dynamic!"

== Personnel ==
- Kazuya Yoshii – vocals and guitar on all tracks
- Alain Johannes – guitar on "Chōzetsu☆Dynamic!"
- Chris Chaney – bass on "Chōzetsu☆Dynamic!"
- Josh Freese – drums on "Chōzetsu☆Dynamic!"
- Hideaki Kikuchi – guitar on "Romantic Ageru yo"
- Jungo Miura (Petrolz) – bass on "Romantic Ageru yo"
- Yoshifumi Yoshida (Triceratops) – drums on "Romantic Ageru yo"
- Simon Isogai – keyboards on "Romantic Ageru yo"

== Charts ==
Chart (2015)	Peak position
Oricon Singles Chart	13
Billboard Japan Hot 100	13
Billboard Japan Top Singles Sales	10
Billboard Japan Hot Animation	2
Billboard Japan Radio Songs	29
