= Makafushigi Adventure! =

1986 single by Hiroki Takahashi

Single by Hiroki Takahashi

from the album Dragon Ball: Music Collection
- A-side: "Makafushigi Adventure!"
- B-side: "Romantic Ageru yo"
- Released: March 1, 1986
- Studio: Mediabum (Shiba, Tokyo)
- Genre: Pop
- Length: 3:42
- Label: Columbia
- Composer: Takeshi Ike
- Lyricist: Yuriko Mori

"Makafushigi Adventure!" (Japanese: 魔訶不思議アドベンチャー！, Hepburn: Makafushigi Adobenchā!; "Mystical Adventure!") is a song by Japanese musician Hiroki Takahashi, released on vinyl and cassette on March 1, 1986. It was Takahashi's debut single.

The song is best known for serving as the opening theme song of the Dragon Ball anime series. It later was re-released on mini CD on March 21, 1998. It is coupled with "Romantic Ageru yo" (Japanese: ロマンティックあげるよ, Hepburn: Romantikku Ageru yo; "I'll Give You Romance"), the show's outro/closing theme song by Ushio Hashimoto.

== Background and recording ==
The audition for the job of composing the theme songs to the Dragon Ball anime adaptation was held in December 1985. Composer Takeshi Ike was invited to participate by a producer who said he was good at writing melodies for girls, and given lyrics to two songs. He composed "Romantic Ageru yo" in about 10 days, and then used the remaining two days before the deadline to compose "Makafushigi Adventure!". Ike later said he heard that around 30 demos were submitted for the opening theme alone, indicating a big audition for the time period. He then found out that he had been given the job for both the opening and ending songs at the same time, which was unusual.

The same producer, who was fluent in English, requested Ike create several different melodies for the part in "Makafushigi Adventure!" where the English word "adventure" is sung, in order to match the native pronunciation. But Ike believed it would not be a problem because Yuriko Mori's lyrics used katakana for the word, and ultimately submitted his first version. The "ma" in the word "makafushigi" was originally written with the Japanese character 摩 that means "rubbing or grinding", but Mori changed it to 魔, the character used in the word "mahou" which means "magic", to better fit the world of Dragon Ball. Singer Hiroki Takahashi recalled the song was difficult to sing, "I remember when we were recording it in the studio, there were so many little cues for timing that I had to follow. The 'ze!' in the starting bit when I sing 'Tsukamou ze!' is something between a 16th and an 8th note, I had trouble with that. (laughs)" "Makafushigi Adventure!" remains the only anime song that Takahashi has sung.

Ike composed "Romantic Ageru yo" with the image of Bulma and feeling like a girl in mind. He praised arranger Kohei Tanaka's "innovative" drum beat rhythm in the song's opening. Both theme songs were recorded on the same day at Mediabum studios near Shiba Park. "Romantic Ageru yo" was sung by female singer Ushio Hashimoto. Sometime later, it was suggested that a chorus be added and Ike harmonized a male chorus to follow the main melody.

== Track listing ==
All music composed by Takeshi Ike, and all tracks arranged by Kohei Tanaka.

No.	Title	Lyrics	Length
1.	"Makafushigi Adventure!" (摩訶不思議アドベンチャー！ Makafushigi Adobenchā!, "Mystical Adventure!")	Yuriko Mori	3:42
2.	"Romantic Ageru yo" (ロマンティックあげるよ Romantikku Ageru yo, "I'll Give You Romance")	Takemi Yoshida	3:45
3.	"Makafushigi Adventure! (Original Karaoke)" (CD only)		3:42
4.	"Romantic Ageru yo (Original Karaoke)" (CD only)		3:45

== 2005 version ==
"Makafushigi Adventure! (2005 Ver.)"

Single by Hiroki Takahashi
- Released: July 20, 2005
- Genre: Pop
- Length: 34:08
- Label: Team Entertainment/Sony
- Composer: Takeshi Ike
- Lyricist: Yuriko Mori

Takahashi recorded a new version of "Makafushigi Adventure!" that was released as a single on July 20, 2005, under the title "Makafushigi Adventure! (2005 Ver.)". It is coupled with new recordings of "Mezase Tenkaichi", "Dragon Ball Densetsu", and "Aoki Tabibito-tachi", which were insert songs in Dragon Ball. The single's cover art features characters from the anime. A "self-cover" version of the single, featuring Takahashi as the cover art, was released as an iTunes exclusive.

=== Track listing ===
All music is composed by Takeshi Ike.

No.	Title	Lyrics	Arrangement	Length
1.	"Makafushigi Adventure! (2005 Ver.)" (魔訶不思議アドベンチャー!（2005 ver.）)	Yuriko Mori	Mikio Sakai	3:49
2.	"Mezase Tenkaichi" (めざせ天下一, "Aim to Be the Greatest on Earth")	Takemi Yoshida	Hiroki Matsunaga	3:43
3.	"Dragon Ball Densetsu" (ドラゴンボール伝説, Doragon Bōru Densetsu, "Dragon Ball Legend")	Onikaku Izumi	Mikio Sakai	3:58
4.	"Aoki Tabibito-tachi" (青き旅人たち, "Blue Travelers")	Yuriko Mori	Hiroki Matsunaga	4:05
5.	"Makafushigi Adventure! (DJ Dr. Knob Remix)" (魔訶不思議アドベンチャー!（DJ Dr. Knob Remix）)	Yuriko Mori	Mikio Sakai	4:46
6.	"Makafushigi Adventure! (2005 Ver. Instrumental)"		Mikio Sakai	3:49
7.	"Mezame Tenkaichi (Instrumental)"		Hiroki Matsunaga	3:43
8.	"Dragon Ball Densetsu (Instrumental)"		Mikio Sakai	3:58
9.	"Aoki Tabibito-tachi (Instrumental)"		Hiroki Matsunaga	4:05

== Cover versions ==
In 1989, Harmony Gold created their own version of the song for their short-lived English dub of Dragon Ball, using the original Japanese music. It features an unknown singer, while the lyrics are credited to Kathryn Nelligan.

In 1991, the song was used for Tagalog news magazine Magandang Gabi... Bayan hosted by Noli de Castro, and from 1992 to 1996 it was used for Tagalog news program TV Patrol of ABS-CBN.

The Creative Products Corporation also created an English version, used for their dub in the Philippines. The song was made by a short-lived singing and dancing group of children/teenagers named Age of Wonder, led by Gino Padilla. The full song was released onto a limited CD called Dragon Ball • Dragon Ball Z: Songs of a High Spirited Saga - Volume 1 in 1996.

Funimation Entertainment also recorded the opening and closing themes, sung in English for their dub. "Mystical Adventure!" was sung by Jimi Tunnell and "Romantic Ageru yo" by Daphne Gere. Though the lyrics were not a literal translation of the original Japanese, they were still somewhat faithful.

In 1998, the group Animetal recorded a heavy metal cover of "Makafushigi Adventure!" for their album This is Japanimetal Marathon. The Animetal tribute band Animetal USA covered the song in English on their 2011 self-titled debut album.

Shoko Nakagawa covered "Romantic Ageru yo" for her 2007 anison cover album Shokotan☆Kaba ~ Anison ni Koi o Shite.

Kazuya Yoshii included a cover of "Romantic Ageru yo", that features his The Yellow Monkey bandmate Hideaki Kikuchi on guitar, on his 2015 single "Chōzetsu☆Dynamic!".
