= Jam/Tactics =

Single by The Yellow Monkey

from the album Four Seasons
- Released: February 29, 1996
- Recorded: 1995
- Genre: Rock
- Length: 19:32
- Label: Triad/Nippon Columbia
- Songwriter: Kazuya Yoshii (both tracks)
- Producers: Kazuya Yoshii; Hiroyuki Munekiyo

The Yellow Monkey singles chronology
"Taiyō ga Moete Iru" (1995)	"Jam/Tactics" (1996)	"Spark" (1996)

"Jam/Tactics" is the ninth single by Japanese rock band The Yellow Monkey, released on February 29, 1996. It is their first double A-side, with both songs written by lead singer Kazuya Yoshii. "Tactics" was previously included on their sixth album, November 1995's Four Seasons, but "Jam" was never included on a studio album.

It is the band's second best-selling single, reaching number 6 on the Oricon Singles Chart and was the 39th best-selling single of the year. "Jam" was an ending theme song for the TV show Pop Jam, while "Tactics" was used as the first ending theme of the Rurouni Kenshin anime series.

== Background and composition ==
According to Nippon Columbia's director at the time, Hiroyuki Munekiyo, with "Jam" Kazuya Yoshii wanted to write the "'All the Young Dudes' of Japan." The song is also reminiscent of Kenji Sawada's 1980 song "Omae ga Paradise". Production on "Jam" took place in September and October 1995. The lyrics are based on real events, with the line about a plane crash often talked about. When Yoshii was writing about the "absurdity of the world," he turned on a television news broadcast covering a plane crash and was struck by how the reporter had a smile on their face when reporting that no Japanese were on the plane.

An airplane crashes overseas. The newscaster says with glee, 'No Japanese aboard. No Japanese. No Japanese.' What am I to think? What am I to say? On nights like this, I want to see you so badly, so badly, so badly. I wait for tomorrow.

However, he notes that the song is about a lot of different things. Although attention is often given to the plane crash line, Yoshii noted that the "On nights like this, I want to see you so badly" line is more important and was directed towards his daughter. Following the Great Hanshin earthquake and Tokyo subway sarin attack, and with him unable to be home much, Yoshii said he was worried about her.

"Tactics" first appeared on the band's sixth studio album Four Seasons, released on November 1, 1995. The single cut is slightly different than the album version. "Tactics" was selected to be an ending theme song of the January 1996 Rurouni Kenshin anime series. Mitsuhisa Hida of SPE Visual Works said that he specifically wanted to use songs that non-anime fans would want to buy. For the English dub of the anime, an English-language version sung by Lex Lang was created.

== Release and promotion ==
Following the success of previous single "Taiyō ga Moete Iru" and their number-one album Four Seasons, Nippon Columbia gave opposition when Yoshii proposed "Jam" be the next single. Munekiyo explained that with "Taiyō ga Moete Iru" being a catchy but still hard rocking song, it was odd to follow it up with a serious ballad. "Jam" was played live for the first time on January 12, 1996, at the Nippon Budokan, where Yoshii explained that its release as a single was still undecided. The Yellow Monkey's head of promotion, Shigeru Nakahara, was a strong believer in the song and successfully urged the band's office to release it.

The Yellow Monkey were set to perform "Jam" on the television show Music Station on March 8, 1996, but because it would have to be altered to fit a four minute time limit, Yoshii threatened to not appear. Again, it was Nakahara who successfully negotiated an unusual five minute slot on the show, with only the outro being cut from the performance. The music video for "Jam" was directed by Yoshii himself. 11 years later, Yoshii had the same actors, who were children at the time of "Jam", appear in the music video for his 2007 song "Bacca".

"Jam" was the last song that The Yellow Monkey performed when they disbanded in 2004. After reuniting in 2016, they performed "Jam" on the 67th NHK Kōhaku Uta Gassen at the end of the year, marking their first appearance at the event. The band re-recorded "Jam" for their 2017 self-cover album, The Yellow Monkey is Here. New Best.

== Reception ==
Tomoki Takahashi of Rockin'On wrote that "Jam" is the song that made The Yellow Monkey a household name throughout Japan, and called it a "masterpiece" that symbolizes the band's attitude. Yoshii said that when he talks to younger musicians who were influenced by The Yellow Monkey, they always cite "Jam" as their best work. Following The Yellow Monkey's disbandment in 2004, Oricon conducted a poll for the band's best song. "Jam" was the number one answer and "Tactics" came in sixteenth place. "Jam" also won a 2012 poll conducted by Natalie and RecoChoku on people's favorite song by The Yellow Monkey. In a 2012 poll conducted by RecoChoku on the best theme song from the Rurouni Kenshin anime, "Tactics" came in fifth place.

At Tokyo University of Foreign Studies' March 2017 graduation ceremony, the university's president Hirotaka Tateishi noted the rise of nationalism, particularly in America, and said "[...] if we are to be true global citizens, we need to think of people in other countries and show respect for their cultures and traditions. Last year, the awarding of the Nobel Prize in Literature to Bob Dylan was a reminder of the power of song and poetry. For me, personally, I have been most affected by the lyrics of a song by a Japanese rock group called The Yellow Monkey." and read the above excerpt of lyrics from "Jam". He noted how these lyrics were published in a full-page advertisement in Asahi Shimbun on December 31, 2016, that ended by saying, "Unfortunately, these lyrics still apply to [Japan]."

== Commercial performance ==
Munekiyo expected the single to peak at number 30 on the chart, while the president of the band's management agency predicted an even worse commercial performance. However, "Jam/Tactics" reached number 6 on the Oricon Singles Chart and charted for 21 weeks. It was certified gold by the RIAJ in March 1996, and certified platinum in April. It was the 39th best-selling single of the year, with 600,580 copies sold. In total it has sold 800,000, making it the band's second best-selling single, behind only 1997's "Burn".

== Track listing ==
All songs written and composed by Kazuya Yoshii. Arranged by The Yellow Monkey.

No.	Title	Length
1.	"Jam"	5:18
2.	"Tactics"	4:28
3.	"Jam (Karaoke)"	5:18
4.	"Tactics (Karaoke)"	4:28

== Personnel ==
The Yellow Monkey

- Kazuya Yoshii – vocals
- Hideaki Kikuchi – guitar
- Youichi Hirose – bass
- Eiji Kikuchi – drums

Other

- Yoshitaka Mikuni – keyboards
- Rafe McKenna – engineer
