= 9999 (album) =

Studio album by The Yellow Monkey
- Released: April 17, 2019
- Recorded: August 2015 – November 2018 in Tokyo, Japan and Los Angeles, California
- Studio: Sunset Sound
- Genre: Rock
- Length: 54:44
- Label: Atlantic/Warner Music Japan
- Producer: Kazuya Yoshii

The Yellow Monkey chronology
| 8 (2000) | 9999 (2019) | Sparkle X (2024) |

Singles from 9999
- 1. "Suna no Tō" Released: October 19, 2016; 2. "Stars" Released: October 27, 2017; 3. "Horizon" Released: November 29, 2017; 4. "Tentomushi" Released: November 8, 2018

9999 (pronounced "Four Nine") is the tenth studio album by Japanese rock band The Yellow Monkey, released on April 17, 2019, by Atlantic Records. It is the band's first album of new material in 19 years and their first since reuniting in 2016. The album was produced by lead singer Kazuya Yoshii, who also wrote almost all of the songs.

9999 was a commercial and critical success, reaching number 3 on both the Oricon Albums Chart and Billboard Japan's Hot Albums chart and winning several awards. An expanded version of the album, titled 9999+1, was released on December 4, 2019, and reached numbers 2 and 4 on the charts.

== Background and recording ==
The Yellow Monkey held their last concert on January 8, 2001, at the Tokyo Dome, beginning an indefinite hiatus, before officially announcing their disbandment on July 7, 2004. After seeing The Rolling Stones perform in London in 2013, Kazuya Yoshii emailed the other members about reuniting, and the band officially announced their reformation on January 8, 2016. They went on the Super Japan Tour 2016 from May 11 to September 11, 2016, and quickly followed it up with another leg subtitled Subjective Late Show from November 12 to December 18.

They had already entered the studio in August 2015 to record new material. Their first new song, "Alright", debuted on the radio on February 10, 2016. Its music video was nominated in the Best Rock Video and Best Group Video - Japan categories at the 2016 MTV Video Music Awards Japan. "Alright" was later included as the B-side of their first single since reuniting, "Suna no Tō", which was released on October 19, 2016. The single was certified gold by the RIAJ in October 2016 for sales of 100,000 copies. "Suna no Tō" was one of two songs that earned The Yellow Monkey the Special Award at the 49th Japan Cable Awards in 2016.

The new song "Roseana" was included in a special edition of the band's May 21, 2017 self-cover album, The Yellow Monkey is Here. New Best. A song called "Stars" was released digitally on October 27, 2017. "Horizon", the theme song of the band's reunion documentary film Ototoki, was released digitally on November 29, 2017, as the final part of three consecutive monthly releases. In October 2018, it was announced that the band had signed with Atlantic/Warner Music Japan. On November 9, 2018, the new song "Tentomushi" was released. The digital song "I Don't Know" was released on January 25, 2019.

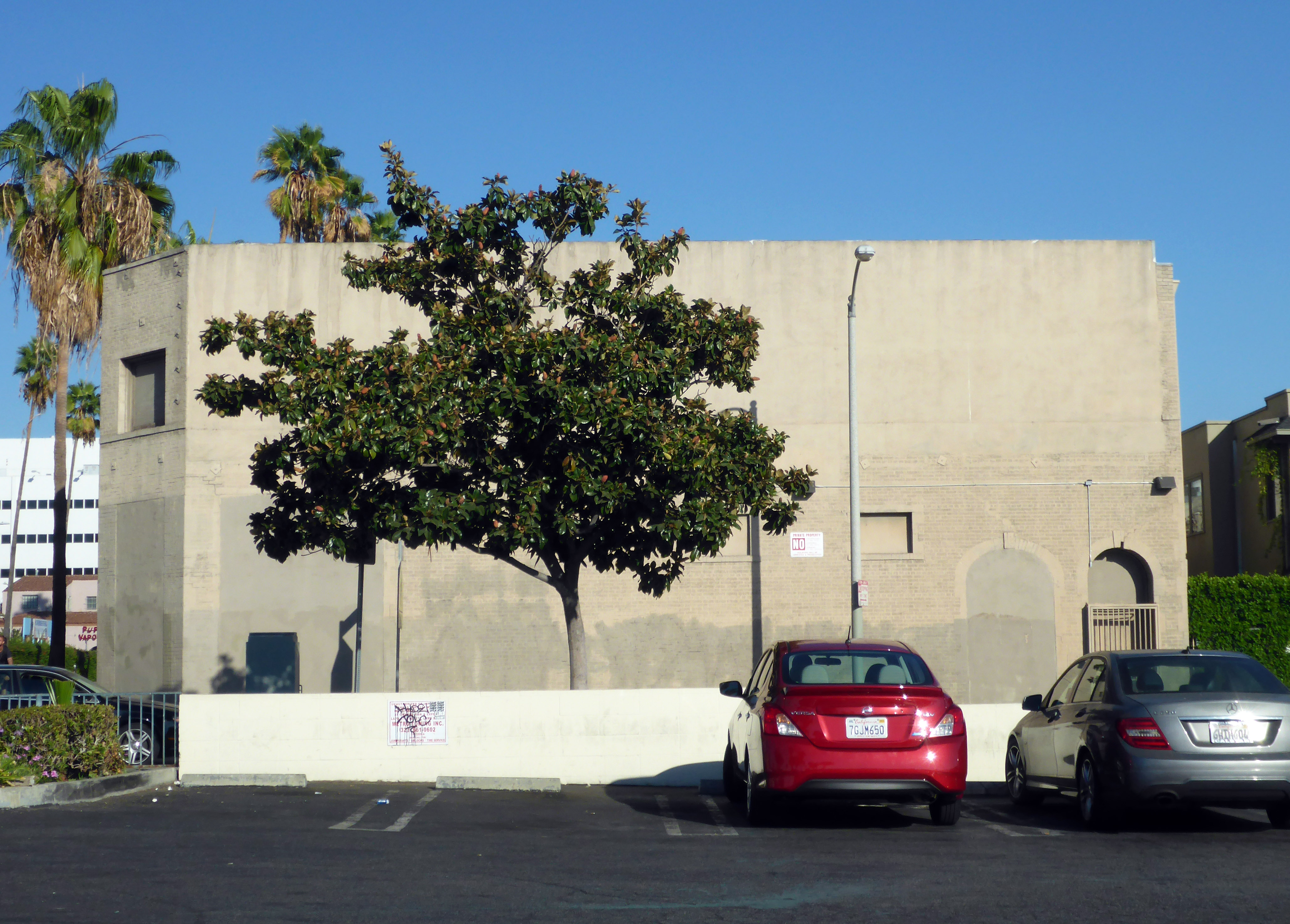
Six of the songs on 9999 were recorded in Los Angeles at Sunset Sound.

The band felt theirs would not be a real reunion unless they released a new album, and production on it truly began in 2018. The members said that touring the previous two years helped them get familiar with each other's playing again and see what kind of sounds they could produce for new material. Eiji Kikuchi stated that the biggest difference from their previous albums is that most of the songs were demoed first. The drummer also said that for the first time, more than half of the album's songs have no cymbals.

It was while working on "Kono Koi no Kakera", after finishing "Tentomushi", that Yoshii proposed the band record in Los Angeles at Sunset Sound, where he often records for his solo career. He contacted the studio's engineer, Kenny Takahashi, and got lucky that it was available. They were recording there two months later. The band brought a minimal amount of equipment to LA; Yoichi Hirose said he brought only a single bass guitar that he recorded all the LA songs on. Yoshii stated that he especially likes the sound of drums recorded at Sunset Sound, which Eiji described as a "dry" sound with natural reverberation. The drummer said recording in LA was liberating compared to Japan where everything is detailed. Six songs from the album were recorded there; "Love Homme", "Breaking the Hide", "Changes Far Away", "Balloon Balloon", "Titta Titta" and "I Don't Know".

The title 9999 was chosen because the number 9,999 is the "maximum" or highest possible with four digits, and the album represents the "maximum" of the four members of the band. The album cover is a collage designed by German duo Rocket & Wink. Among other things, it is intended to represent the cycle of life, the universe, the past and future. Its black background represents the band's long disbandment period. The album title is written on the cover with each "9" using a different typeface.

== Themes ==
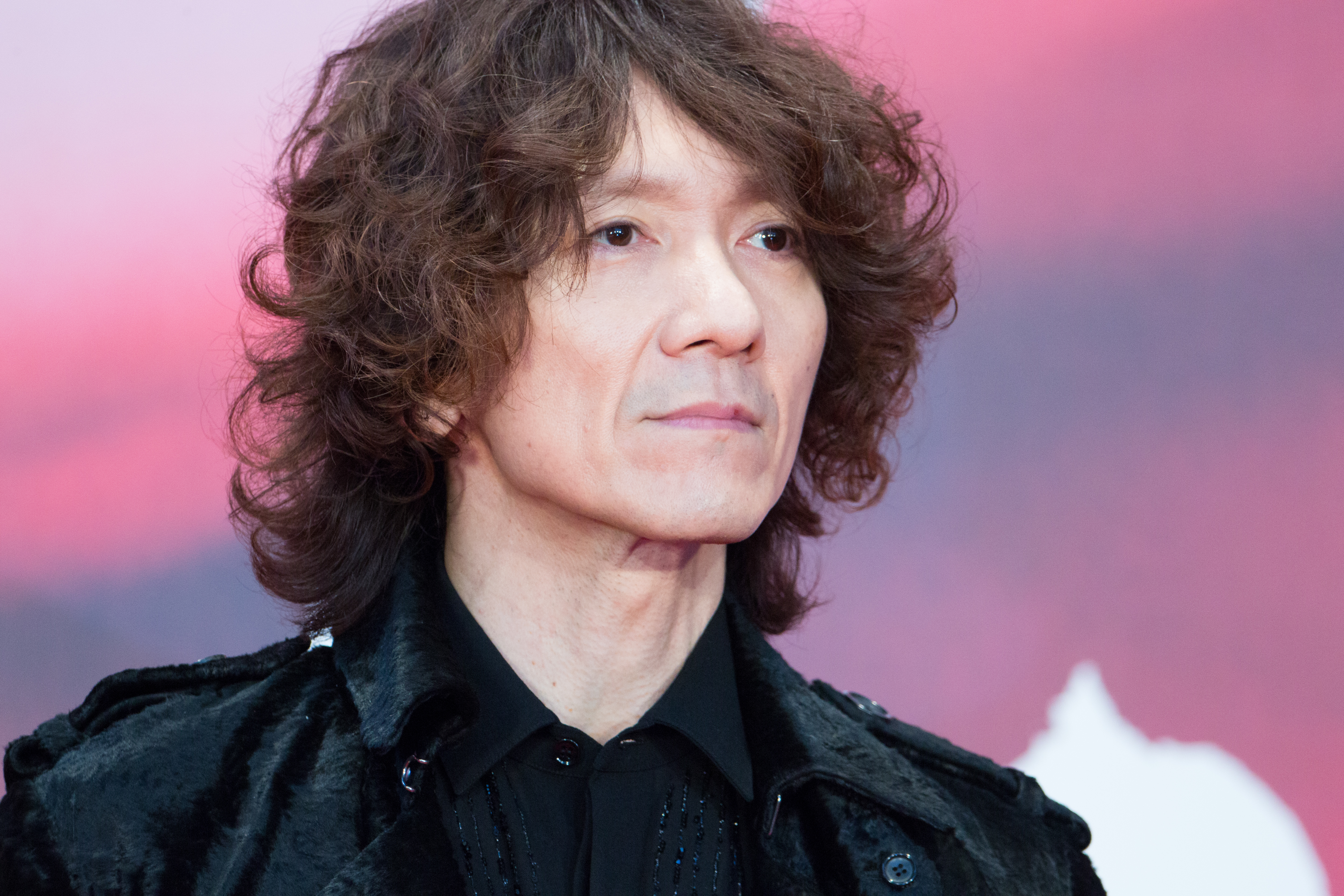
Lead vocalist Kazuya Yoshii wrote almost all of the songs on the album.

Tomoki Takahashi of Rockin'On called "Kono Koi no Kakera" a "medium ballad." The Yellow Monkey recorded the song in Japan in July 2018 with Masami Tsuchiya producing. It was done in a studio with old equipment, such as a vintage Neve mixing console, which Yoshii said gave it an "American" and 1950s rock and roll feel. The guitar part at the beginning and ending of the song was done in a Mick Ronson-style at Tsuchiya's suggestion. Yoshii compared the song's tone to that of David Bowie's "Heroes". Its lyrics follow those of "Tōge", the final song from The Yellow Monkey's previous album 8, and as such the band's staff suggested it open the new album. The guitar arpeggio played by Hideaki Kikuchi in the song is also similar to the one in "Tōge".

"Tentomushi" includes elements of stoner rock, which Yoshii had previously worked with in his solo career. The song was made to be the theme of the TV drama adaptation of the mahjong manga Ten: Tenhō-dōri no Kaidanji. Having grown up listening to The Yellow Monkey, the drama's producer Taku Matsumoto requested they do it. The song has a mahjong theme, however, Yoshii has never played the game and so he read the manga diligently. He included author Nobuyuki Fukumoto's signature onomatopoeia "zawa" (ざわ) in the lyrics. Its lyrics also developed from those of "Merome", another track from 8. Eiji described the drums in "Tentomushi" as very simple. The intro and outro are a play on those heard in Steppenwolf's "Born to Be Wild".

"Love Homme" has been called "groovy" and "boogie rock". Hirose's bass drives the song and was played in the fingerpicking style at the suggestion of engineer Kenny Takahashi. Hirose used a 1967 Gibson Thunderbird that he brought with him to Los Angeles. Eiji specifically mentioned the lack of cymbals on the track. The guitar playing on the track was influenced by Brian May.

Yoshii wrote "Stars" with David Bowie in mind. It was made with the theme of "subdued gaudiness" (地味派手) and recorded in one take.

Yoshii said that "Breaking the Hide" is in line with "Kegawa no Kōto no Blues", and compared its worldview to that of the 1974 film The Night Porter. He also mentioned The Clash and Iron Maiden in relation to the song. Hideaki used a Gibson Flying V once owned and autographed by Michael Schenker for the guitar solo. Hideaki had the image of Eastern Europe for the song, and Yoshii wrote the lyrics with that in mind and included a vampire angle. The "Hide" in the title refers to Hideaki's name and to the fact that his singing voice resembles that of Hyde.

"Roseana" was recorded in 2017. Music critic Yu-ichi Hirayama called the song very danceable with a very simple structure, while using a "psychedelic scale." He also noted that the "mysterious" lyrics give it an "exoticism."

While Yū Aoki of Ongaku to Hito referred to "Changes Far Away" as an "orthodox rock ballad," Spice's Hideo Miyamoto called it a soul ballad. With the lyrics, Yoshii said he tried to express the beauty and difficulty of growing up. Although the song was written and arranged before Yoshii saw Bohemian Rhapsody, the singer requested Hideaki play Brian May-like guitar. Yoshii also said the song has elements of Elton John and The Band, while Hirose suggested it had a little Billy Joel as well.

"Suna no Tō" was written to be the theme song of the TV drama Suna no Tō ~ Shiri Sugita Rinjin. Tomonori Shiba of Real Sound wrote that the lyrics are closely related to the show and that the song's "disturbing" melody fits the suspense drama. The strings on the track were arranged by Motoki Funayama, who Yoshii had previously worked with on "Bara to Taiyō" for KinKi Kids, and resulted in what the singer called a fusion of "Shōwa era kayō" and Western music.

Miyamoto described "Balloon Balloon" as reminiscent of 1960s group sounds. Hideaki performed his guitar parts in a Spanish style. Yoshii wrote the lyrics with the image of an old French apartment in mind, and used the words "civet" and "café au lait" due to the influence of singer Yoshitaka Minami. Aoki felt the lyrics were reminiscent of Bob Dylan.

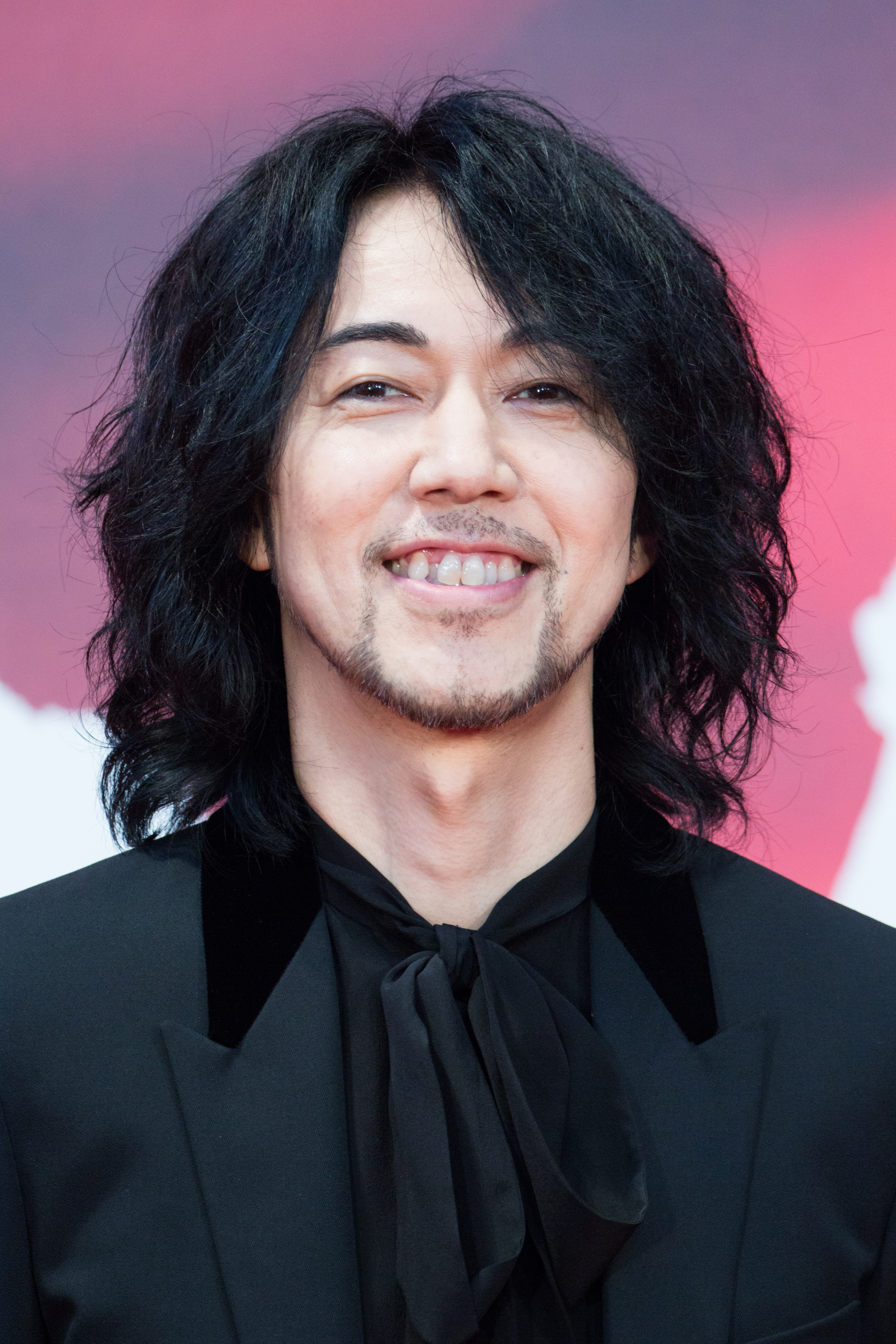
"Horizon" marks the first time guitarist Hideaki Kikuchi wrote lyrics for the band.

When The Yellow Monkey reunited in 2016, production began on Ototoki, a 2017 documentary film about the reunion. Director Daishi Matsunaga requested a song for the movie, and Hideaki wrote "Horizon" to act as its theme song. It marks the first time he wrote lyrics for the band. With them he wanted to express his gratitude to his bandmates after touring for a year. Yoshii described the track as being similar to the guitarist's solo work, "In a good way."

Yoshii stated that "Titta Titta" contains the "essence of Western music in 1969." The first half of the song features Yoshii playing guitar. Both Aoki and Ēji Ogura of AERA dot. called Hideaki's lead guitar part reminiscent of The Rolling Stones. The lyrics were written to be like a picture book, with Yoshii and Hirose comparing them to Yellow Submarine and Alice in Wonderland respectively. The song's title is meant to evoke the image of a magical spell and an exotic, psychedelic tune. It was tentatively titled "Ravi Shankar Ojisan no Musume" (ラヴィ・シャンカールおじさんの娘).

As the band's first new song after reuniting, "Alright" is the oldest track on the album, having been recorded at the end of 2015. They had many other candidates to be their first reunion song, but the band's staff said "Alright" would be a good live song. Shiba called it a straight rock song with a blues and hard rock skeleton.

"I Don't Know" was written to be the theme song of the TV drama Keiji Zero, which is about a detective that lost his memory, and as such has a theme of "memory." The show's producer, Ikuei Yokochi, asked for a "mysterious and cynical" song.

The digital version of the album includes "Kegawa no Kōto no Blues" as a bonus track. It is a song from the band's indie years that they never recorded. It was recorded in Japan with Tsuchiya producing. Yoshii stated that the song is closely related to "Breaking the Hide".

The 9999+1 expanded version of the album includes four additional tracks. The instrumental "Bon Appetit" makes up two of them as it is split into an "Opening" and "Ending", and was used as the band's entrance music on the tour. Yoshii said it was planned to be included on the original version of the album after recording it in LA, but he did not make it in time and had to finish it in Japan. "Darekani -Demo-" is from the original album's sessions, but was not included for "balance." The Hideaki-composed "Eien -Demo 2015-" is an outtake from the sessions of "Alright" that took place in 2015, when the band's reformation was not publicly known. Yoshii and Hirose both expressed desire to complete the song one day, with the singer speculating that it would be on their next album. Both demos have no official lyrics, but Yoshii is heard scat singing on them.

== Release ==
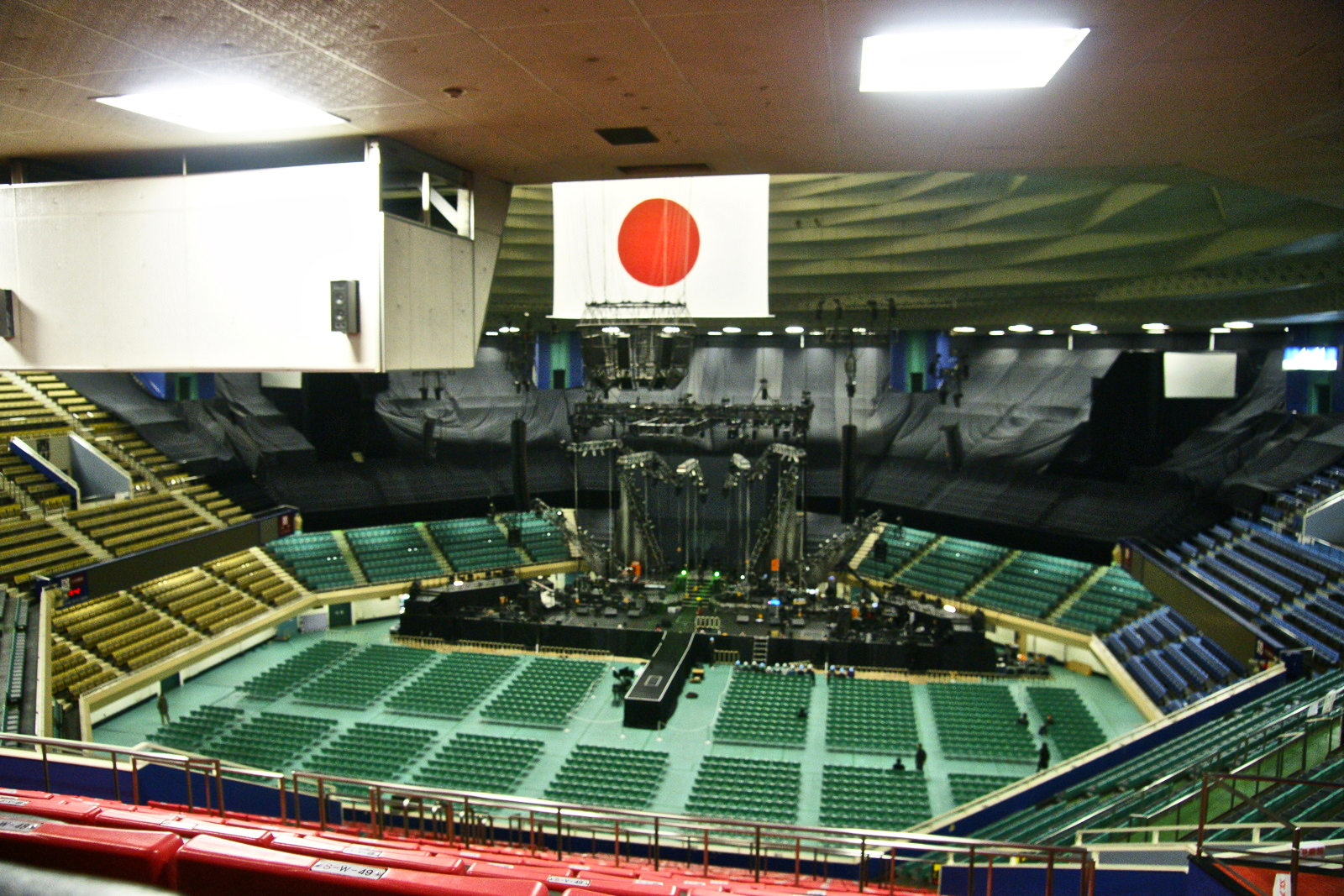
Before its release, The Yellow Monkey performed 9999 in its entirety at the Nippon Budokan for a limited audience.

Before the album's release, the band held a "listening event" at the Nippon Budokan on March 28, 2019, where they performed each of its songs live. 50,000 people applied to be a part of the event's limited audience of 9,999. 9999 was released on April 17, 2019, in three different editions; a normal physical version, a digital version, and a limited edition. The digital version includes a bonus track, while the limited edition includes a DVD of various live performances of past songs and documentary footage of the making of 9999. If the normal or limited edition was purchased at select stores, an additional DVD containing the live performance of "Primal." from May 11, 2016, was given on a first-come, first-serve basis. Those who reserved the album on iTunes between January 25 and April 16, were sent an instrumental version of the 13-track album. 9999 was supported by the 27-date The Yellow Monkey Super Japan Tour 2019 -Grateful Spoonful-, which took place from April 27 to September 22, 2019.

To celebrate the band's 30th anniversary, an expanded version of the album was released on December 4, 2019. The full title of this version is 30th Anniversary 『9999+1』 -Grateful Spoonful Edition-. It includes four additional songs, a DVD of their August 3, 2019 concert at Sekisui Heim Super Arena and a 204-page photo booklet containing photographs from the Grateful Spoonful tour. The album cover was again created by Rocket & Wink and is similar to the original, but has a white background to contrast with the original's black, representing the "light" that the band's touring brought their fans.

== Reception ==
Writing for Natalie, Tomoyuki Mori described 9999 as mixing aspects of garage rock, glam rock and psychedelic rock and said it succeeds in highlighting the four band members' current style. He also said it minimizes dubbing, creating rich and dynamic grooves with only a few notes. In a review for Mikiki, Yuji Tayama wrote that the album is transparent in its blues and glam rock influences and has the pop appeal and licentiousness that The Yellow Monkey has always had. He also called "I Don't Know" a masterpiece. Ēji Ogura of AERA dot. described "Love Homme" as a tribute to glam rock but with a different approach than the band had done previously and called "Changes Far Away" one of the album's highlights. According to Yu-ichi Hirayama of Entertainment Station, the "mysterious" lyrics of "Roseana" give the song an "exoticism" that might cause new listeners to become interested in The Yellow Monkey. Real Sound's Tomokazu Nishihiro wrote that "Horizon" was likely to become a representative song of the band in the future.

9999 won Album of the Year at the 61st Japan Record Awards in 2019. In 2020, it was a winning work at the CD Shop Awards and won Album of the Year at the 2020 Space Shower Music Awards.

== Commercial performance ==
9999 peaked at number 3 on both the Oricon Albums Chart and Billboard Japan's Hot Albums chart. (Note: Note that Oricon combines April 2019's 9999 and December 2019's expanded version 9999+1 together. Thus it lists 9999 as reaching number 2 on December 16, 2019. However, that was actually 9999+1.) However, it topped Oricon's Rock Albums and Digital Albums charts, as well as Billboard Japan's Download Albums chart. It also reached number 3 on Billboard Japan's Top Albums chart, which is based only on physical sales. The album was certified gold by the RIAJ in April 2019 for sales of 100,000 copies. The expanded version of the album, 9999+1, reached number 2 on Oricon's Albums Chart and its Rock Albums chart. It reached number 4 on Billboard Japan's Hot Albums chart and number 3 on its Top Albums chart.

== Track listing ==
All tracks are written by Kazuya Yoshii and arranged by The Yellow Monkey, except where noted.

9999 track listing (Note: On 9999+1, "Roseana" is 5 seconds shorter, "Horizon" is 1 second shorter, and "I Don't Know" is 1 second longer than their counterparts on the original album.)
| No. | Title | Arrangement | Length |
|---|---|---|---|
| 1. | "Kono Koi no Kakera" (この恋のかけら) | Masami Tsuchiya, The Yellow Monkey | 5:20 |
| 2. | "Tentomushi" (天道虫) | | 3:46 |
| 3. | "Love Homme" | | 3:41 |
| 4. | "Stars (9999 Version)" | The Yellow Monkey, Motoki Funayama (strings) | 4:06 |
| 5. | "Breaking the Hide" (music by Hideaki Kikuchi) | | 2:56 |
| 6. | "Roseana" (ロザーナ) | | 4:45 |
| 7. | "Changes Far Away" | | 4:00 |
| 8. | "Suna no Tō" (砂の塔) | The Yellow Monkey, Motoki Funayama (strings) | 4:43 |
| 9. | "Balloon Balloon" | | 4:12 |
| 10. | "Horizon" (lyrics and music by Hideaki Kikuchi) | | 5:07 |
| 11. | "Titta Titta" | | 2:52 |
| 12. | "Alright" | | 4:42 |
| 13. | "I Don't Know" | | 4:34 |
| 14. | "Kegawa no Kōto no Blues" (毛皮のコートのブルース), (digital edition only) | Masami Tsuchiya, The Yellow Monkey | 7:05 |

9999+1 additional tracks
| No. | Title | Arrangement | Length |
|---|---|---|---|
| 1. | "Bon Appetit -Opening-" (ボナペティ-OPENING-) | Kazuya Yoshii | 2:09 |
| 15. | "Bon Appetit -Ending-" (ボナペティ-ENDING-) | Kazuya Yoshii | 2:18 |
| 16. | "Darekani -Demo-" (ダレカニ-demo-) | | 4:40 |
| 17. | "Eien -Demo 2015-" (music by Hideaki Kikuchi) | | 4:37 |

== Personnel ==
The Yellow Monkey

- Kazuya Yoshii – vocals, guitar
- Hideaki Kikuchi – guitar
- Yoichi Hirose – bass
- Eiji Kikuchi – drums

Other

- Kenny Takahashi – Farfisa organ and programming on "Love Homme"
- Takashi Tsurutani – keyboard on "Stars (9999 Version)", "Suna no Tō" and "Horizon", piano and organ on "Roseana"
- Shunsuke Watanabe – synthesizer on "Stars (9999 Version)"
- Jamie Muhoberac – piano on "Changes Far Away", organ on "Balloon Balloon", "Titta Titta" and "I Don't Know"
- Pat Sansone – keyboard on "Alright"
- Joe LaPorta – mastering on 9999
- Bob Ludwig – mastering on 9999+1

== Notes ==
| Preceded by Bootleg (Kenshi Yonezu) | Japan Record Award for the Best Album; 2019 | Succeeded by N/A |
