= Kaori Manabe =

Japanese actress (born 1980)

- 眞鍋 かをり
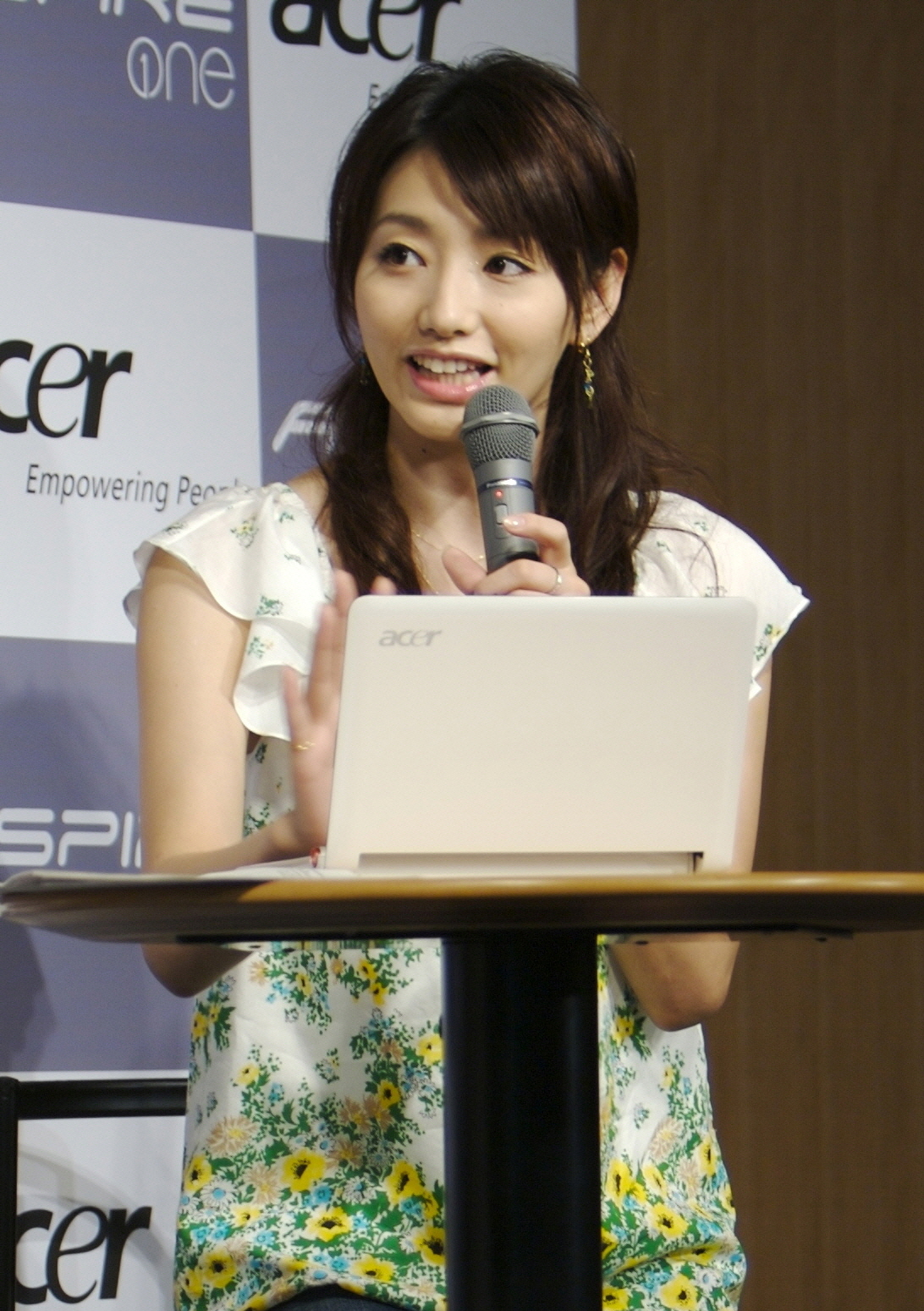
- Kaori Manabe on July 10, 2008
- Born: May 31, 1980 (age 46); Saijō, Ehime, Japan
- Education: Yokohama National University
- Occupations: talent; gravure idol; actress
- Years active: 1999-present
- Spouse: Kazuya Yoshii (m. 2015)
- Children: 1
- Website: blog.livedoor.jp/kaworimanabe/

Kaori Manabe (眞鍋 かをり, Manabe Kaori) is a Japanese talent, gravure idol and actress. She was born on May 31, 1980, in Ehime Prefecture, Japan.

== Personal life ==
On June 26, 2015, it was announced that Manabe married rock musician Kazuya Yoshii and was pregnant with his child and due to give birth in the fall. Their marriage certificate was submitted in September and Kaori gave birth on October 20, 2015. She first met Yoshii, who is fourteen years her senior, in autumn 2011 and has been a fan of his band The Yellow Monkey since middle school.

== Works ==
Her television roles have included the following.

- Science Zero (NHK)
- Waku Waku (Chukyo TV)
- Water Boys
- Ultraman R/B as Mio Minato
