= 2016 MTV Video Music Awards Japan =

Annual Japanese music awards ceremony

- Date: October 26, 2016
- Location: Tokyo
- Hosted by: Rip Slyme

Television/radio coverage
- Network: MTV Japan

The 2016 MTV Video Music Awards Japan was held in Tokyo on October 26, 2016 and was hosted by Rip Slyme.

== Nominees ==
Nominations were announced on September 1, 2016.

=== Best Video of the Year ===
Hikaru Utada — "Manatsu no Tōriame"

=== Best Male Video ===
==== Japan ====
Yu Takahashi — "Hikari no Hahen"

- AK-69 — "Flying B"
- Daichi Miura — "Cry & Fight"
- Motohiro Hata — "Sumire"
- Rekishi (feat. Morino Ishimatsu) — "Saigo no Shogun"
- Yu Takahashi — "Hikari no Hahen"

==== International ====
Justin Bieber — "Sorry"

- Drake — "Hotline Bling"
- James Bay — "Let It Go"
- Justin Timberlake — "Can't Stop the Feeling!"
- The Weeknd — "Can't Feel My Face"

=== Best Female Video ===
==== Japan ====
Hikaru Utada — "Manatsu no Tōriame"

- Namie Amuro — "Mint"
- Juju — "What You Want"
- Kyary Pamyu Pamyu — "Sai & Go"
- Kana Nishino — "Anata no Suki na Tokoro"

==== International ====
Ariana Grande — "Into You"

- Adele — "Hello"
- Beyoncé — "Formation"
- Rihanna (feat. Drake) — "Work"
- Sia — "Cheap Thrills (Performance Edit)"

=== Best Group Video ===
==== Japan ====
Exile The Second — "Shut Up!! Shut Up!! Shut Up!!"

- Babymetal — "Karate"
- Perfume — "Flash"
- Vamps (feat. Chris Motionless of Motionless in White) — "Inside of Me"
- The Yellow Monkey — "Alright"

==== International ====
Fifth Harmony (feat. Ty Dolla Sign) — "Work from Home"

- Coldplay — "Up&Up"
- Pentatonix — "Can't Sleep Love"
- The 1975 — "Ugh!"
- The Vamps — "Wake Up"

=== Best New Artist Video ===
==== Japan ====
Suchmos — "Mint"

- Ame no Parade — "You"
- Boku no Lyric no Bōyomi — "Newspeak"
- Faky — "Candy"
- Wednesday Campanella — "Tsuchinoko"

==== International ====
DNCE — "Cake by the Ocean"

- Charlie Puth — "One Call Away"
- Halsey — "New Americana"
- Jack Garratt — "Breathe Life"
- Lukas Graham — "7 Years"

=== Best Album of the Year ===
==== Japan ====
Babymetal — Metal Resistance

- Back Number — Chandelier
- Bump of Chicken — Butterflies
- Kana Nishino — Just Love
- Perfume — Cosmic Explorer

==== International ====
Beyoncé — Lemonade

- Adele — 25
- Drake — Views
- Justin Bieber — Purpose
- Rihanna — Anti

=== Best Rock Video ===
Alexandros — "Swan"

- Coldplay — "Up&Up"
- Radiohead — "Daydreaming"
- Red Hot Chili Peppers — "Dark Necessities"
- The Yellow Monkey — "Alright"

=== Best Metal Video ===
Babymetal — "Karate"

- Crossfaith — "Rx Overdrive"
- Deftones — "Prayers / Triangles"
- Iron Maiden — "Speed of Light"
- Trivium — "Silence in the Snow"

=== Best Pop Video ===
Nissy — "Playing With Fire"

- Ariana Grande — "Into You"
- Fifth Harmony (feat. Ty Dolla Sign) — "Work from Home"
- Justin Bieber — "What Do You Mean?"
- Kana Nishino — "Anata no Suki na Tokoro"

=== Best R&B Video ===
Daichi Miura — "Cry & Fight"

- Alessia Cara — "Here"
- Bryson Tiller — "Don't"
- Usher (feat. Young Thug) — "No Limit"
- The Weeknd — "Can't Feel My Face"

=== Best Hip Hop Video ===
AK-69 — "Flying B"

- Chance the Rapper (feat. Saba) — "Angels"
- Drake — "Hotline Bling"
- Desiigner — "Panda"
- Kanye West — "Famous"

=== Best Dance Video ===
Boom Boom Satellites — "Lay Your Hands on Me"

- Calvin Harris (feat. Rihanna) — "This Is What You Came For"
- Disclosure (feat. Lorde) — "Magnets"
- Kygo (feat. Maty Noyes) — "Stay"
- Mike Posner — "I Took a Pill in Ibiza (Seeb Remix)"

=== Best Choreography ===
Generations from Exile Tribe — "Ageha"

- Beat Buddy Boi — "B-Boi Scramble"
- Fifth Harmony (feat. Ty Dolla Sign) — "Work from Home"
- Justin Bieber — "Sorry"
- Sia — "Alive"

== Special awards ==
=== Best Teen Choice Award ===
Sakura Fujiwara — "Soup"

- Doberman Infinity — "Ga Ga Summer"
- Scandal — "Take Me Out"
- Sky-Hi — "Nanairo Holiday"
- Rei Yasuda — "Message"

=== Inspirational Award Japan ===
The Yellow Monkey
