= Animetal Marathon =

Studio album by Animetal
- Released: March 21, 1997; April 21, 1997 (karaoke)
- Recorded: 1996
- Studios: MIT Studio; Arc Garret; Power House Studio; Studio Take-One; On Air Azabu Studio
- Genres: Heavy metal; anison
- Length: 42:19
- Language: Japanese
- Label: Sony Records
- Producer: Animetal

Animetal chronology
Animetal Marathon (1997)	Animetal Marathon II (1998)

Animetal Marathon (アニメタル・マラソン, Animetaru Marason) is the first full-length album by Japanese novelty heavy metal band Animetal, released through Sony Records on March 21, 1997. The album consists of a non-stop marathon of metal covers of anime themes from the 1960s, 1970s, and 1980s. A karaoke version of this album was also released on April 21, 1997. This is also the only studio album to feature the band as a quartet; all other releases have the band as a trio with a guest drummer.

"Gatchaman no Uta," "Combattler V no Theme," "Yūsha Raideen," "Tatakae! Casshan," "Mazinger Z," "Getter Robo" and "Devilman no Uta" were previously recorded as a six-minute marathon and independently released as the band's self-titled 1996 EP. "Uchū Senkan Yamato," "Umi no Triton," "Great Mazinger," "Tatakae! Polymar," "Tiger Mask," "Babel II" and "Taga Tame ni (Cyborg 009 theme)" were recorded as a separate marathon titled This is Animetal. Majority of this album was mixed with tracks from This is Animetal, Tokusatsu de Ikou!, Animetal Summer, Animetal Lady Sanjo!, Animetal Lady Kenzan and Animetal Lady Marathon and released internationally as This Is Japanimetal Marathon.

Some songs in the marathon incorporate guitar riffs from classic hard rock and heavy metal songs. For instance, "Suki da Danguard Ace" uses the intro riff of Led Zeppelin's "Communication Breakdown."

The album cover's unnamed skeleton mascot is a parody of Iron Maiden's Eddie and Megadeth's Vic Rattlehead. He also appears on Animetal's albums and singles released by Sony Records. A female counterpart is used on Animetal Lady Marathon and its associated singles.

== Track listing ==
All tracks are arranged by Animetal.

No.	Title	Original anime	Length
1.	"Theme of Animetal" (Animetaru no Tēma (アニメタルのテーマ))		1:03
2.	"Gatchaman no Uta" ((ガッチャマンの歌; "Song of Gatchaman"))	Science Ninja Team Gatchaman	0:44
3.	"Umi no Triton" (Umi no Toriton (海のトリトン))	Triton of the Sea	1:10
4.	"Tekkaman no Uta" ((テッカマンの歌; "Song of Tekkaman"))	Tekkaman: The Space Knight	0:56
5.	"Tatakae! Casshan" (Tatakae! Kyashān (たたかえ！キャシャーン; "Fight! Casshan"))	Casshan	0:44
6.	"Tatakae! Polymar" (Tatakae! Porimā (戦え！ポリマー; "Fight! Polymar"))	Hurricane Polymar	0:52
7.	"Ikuzo! Gōdam" (Ikuzo! Gōdamu (行くぞ！ゴーダム; "Let's Go! Gōdam"))	Gowappa 5 Gōdam	0:50
8.	"Babel Nisei" (Babiru Nisei (バビル2世))	Babel II	0:43
9.	"Combattler V Theme" (Kon Batorā Bui no Tēma (コン・バトラーVのテーマ))	Chōdenji Robo Combattler V	0:49
10.	"Voltes V no Uta" (Borutesu Faibu no Uta (ボルテスVの歌; "Song of Voltes V"))	Chōdenji Machine Voltes V	1:32
11.	"Tate! Tōshō Daimos" (Tate! Tōshō Daimosu (立て！闘将ダイモス; "Arise! Brave Leader Daimos"))	Tōshō Daimos	1:09
12.	"Yūsha Raideen" (Yūsha Raidīn (勇者ライディーン))	Reideen The Brave	0:53
13.	"Daikūmaryū Gaiking (Note: Song ending incorporates Ozzy Osbourne's "Crazy Train")" (Daikūmaryū Gaikingu (大空魔竜ガイキング; "Great Sky King Gaiking"))	Dino Mech Gaiking	0:57
14.	"Suki da Danguard Ace (Note: Incorporates Led Zeppelin's "Communication Breakdown")" (Suki da Dangādo Ēsu (すきだッ ダンガードA; "We Love You, Danguard Ace"))	Wakusei Robo Danguard Ace	0:55
15.	"Dash! Machine Hayabusa" (Dasshu! Mashin Hayabusa (ダッシュ！マシンハヤブサ))	Machine Hayabusa	1:14
16.	"Grand Prix no Taka" (Guranpuri no Taka (ランプリの鷹; "Hawk of the Grand Prix"))	Arrow Emblem: Hawk of the Grand Prix	0:57
17.	"Tiger Mask" (Taigā Masuku (タイガーマスク))	Tiger Mask	0:31
18.	"Hyōga Senshi Gaislugger" (Hyōga Senshi Gaisuraggā (氷河戦士ガイスラッガー; "Glacier Warrior Gaislugger"))	Hyōga Senshi Gaislugger	0:48
19.	"Taga Tame ni" ((誰がために; "For Who's Sake"))	Cyborg 009	1:02
20.	"Ginga Tetsudō 999" (Ginga Tetsudō Surī Nain (銀河鉄道999))	Galaxy Express 999	1:46
21.	"Captain Harlock (Note: Song ending incorporates Kiss' "Love Gun")" (Kyaputen Hārokku (キャプテンハーロック))	Space Pirate Captain Harlock	0:59
22.	"Uchū Senkan Yamato" ((宇宙戦艦ヤマト))	Space Battleship Yamato	0:58
23.	"Tobe! Gundam (Note: Incorporates Scorpions' "Blackout")" (Tobe! Gundamu (翔べ！ガンダム; "Fly! Gundam"))	Mobile Suit Gundam	1:22
24.	"Fukkatsu no Ideon" ((復活のイデオン; "Ideon's Rebirth"))	Space Runaway Ideon	1:04
25.	"Macross" (Makurosu (マクロス))	Super Dimension Fortress Macross	1:35
26.	"Ike! Zambot 3" (Ike! Zanbotto Surī (行け！ザンボット3; "Go! Zambot 3"))	Invincible Super Man Zambot 3	1:41
27.	"Come Here! Daitarn 3 (Note: Incorporates Iron Maiden's "Running Free")" (Kamu Hia! Daitān Surī (カムヒア！ダイターン3))	Invincible Steel Man Daitarn 3	1:16
28.	"Shippu Xabungle" (Shippū Zabungaru (疾風ザブングル; "Gale Wind Xabungle"))	Combat Mecha Xabungle	1:21
29.	"Dunbine Tobu" (Danbain Tobu (ダンバインとぶ; Flying Dunbine))	Aura Battler Dunbine	1:38
30.	"Saraba Yasashiki Hibi yo (Note: Incorporates Whitesnake's "Crying in the Rain")" ((さらばやさしき日々よ; "Farewell, Gentle Days"))	Fang of the Sun Dougram	1:48
31.	"Honō no Sadame (Note: Guitar riff is loosely derived from Rainbow's "Since You Been Gone")" ((炎のさだめ; "Tragedy of Fire"))	Armored Trooper Votoms	1:26
32.	"Mazinger Z" (Majingā Zetto (マジンガーZ))	Mazinger Z	0:52
33.	"Ore wa Great Mazinger" (Ore wa Gurēto Majingā (おれはグレートマジンガー; "I Am Great Mazinger"))	Great Mazinger	1:03
34.	"Tobe! Grendizer" (Tobe! Gurendazā (とべ！グレンダイザー; "Fly! Grendizer"))	UFO Robo Grendizer	0:54
35.	"Getter Robo!" (Gettā Robo! (ゲッターロボ！))	Getter Robo	0:55
36.	"Kōtetsu Jeeg no Uta (Note: Incorporates Deep Purple's "Burn")" (Kōtetsu Jīgu no Uta (鋼鉄ジーグのうた; "Song of Steel Jeeg"))	Steel Jeeg	1:28
37.	"Devilman no Uta" (Debiruman no Uta (デビルマンのうた; "Song of Devilman"))	Devilman	1:08
38.	"Theme of Animetal (Reprise)" (Animetaru no Tēma (Reprise) (アニメタルのテーマ(Reprise)))		0:52
Total length:			42:19

== Personnel ==
- Eizo Sakamoto (坂本 英三, Sakamoto Eizō) - Lead vocals
- She-Ja (屍忌蛇, Shiija) - Guitar
- Masaki - Bass
- Yasuhiro Umezawa (梅澤 康博, Umezawa Yasuhiro) - Drums
