= This Is Japanimetal Marathon =

This is Japanimetal Marathon

Compilation album by Animetal
- Released: April 7, 1998
- Recorded: 1996–1997
- Studio: MIT Studio
- Genre: Heavy metal; anison
- Length: 42:22
- Language: Japanese
- Label: Sony Music Entertainment Asia
- Producer: Animetal; Junzo Tsukuda; Yorimasa Hisatake

Animetal chronology
Animetal Marathon II / Animetal Lady Marathon (1998)	This is Japanimetal Marathon (1998)	Best of Animetal (1998)

This is Japanimetal Marathon is a compilation album by Japanese novelty heavy metal band Animetal, released in Asia by Sony Music Entertainment Asia on April 7, 1998. The album consists mainly of Animetal Marathon mixed with select tracks from the band's singles along with those of Animetal Lady. Each track is labeled by the anime/tokusatsu title they come from, not by their original song title.

"Makafushigi Adventure!" (from Dragon Ball) is an exclusive track not found in Animetal's other releases.

== Track listing ==
All tracks are arranged by Animetal.

No.	Title	Original title	Length
1.	"Theme of Animetal"		1:02
2.	"Kagaku Ninjatai Gatchaman"	"Gatchaman no Uta"	0:44
3.	"Umi no Triton"	"Umi no Triton" (Note: "This Is Animetal" single version)	1:06
4.	"Babel II"	"Babel Nisei"	0:44
5.	"Chōdenji Robo Combattler V"	"Combattler V no Theme"	0:46
6.	"Chōdenji Robo Combattler V (Note: From "Sentimetal")"	"Ike! Combattler V"	0:51
7.	"Chōdenji Machine Voltes V"	"Voltes V no Uta"	1:32
8.	"Tōshō Daimos"	"Tate! Tōshō Daimos"	1:09
9.	"Yūsha Raideen"	"Yūsha Raideen"	0:53
10.	"Wakusei Robo Danguard Ace (Note: Incorporates Led Zeppelin's "Communication Breakdown")"	"Suki da Danguard Ace"	0:55
11.	"Dragon Ball (Note: Previously unreleased)"	"Makafushigi Adventure!"	1:40
12.	"Kamen Rider V3 (Note: From "Tokusatsu de Ikō!")"	"Tatakae! Kamen Rider V3"	0:54
13.	"Tiger Mask"	"Tiger Mask"	0:30
14.	"Cyborg 009"	"Taga Tame ni"	1:00
15.	"Ganbare Genki (Note: From "Animetal Summer")"	"Kaze ni Nare"	1:14
16.	"Ashita no Joe (Note: From "Animetal Summer")"	"Ashita no Joe"	1:13
17.	""Galaxy Express 999""	"Ginga Tetsudō 999"	1:46
18.	"Candy Candy (Note: From "Animetal Lady Kenzan!")"	"Candy Candy"	0:59
19.	"Alps no Shōjo Heidi (Note: From "Animetal Lady Kenzan!"; guitar riff is loosely based on Led Zeppelin's "Immigrant Song")"	"Oshiete"	1:02
20.	"Haha wo Tazunete Sanzenri (Note: From "Animetal Lady Kenzan!"; incorporates Whitesnake's "Fool for Your Loving")"	"Sōgen no Marco"	1:43
21.	"Sailor Moon (Note: From Animetal Lady Marathon; song ending incorporates main riff from Metallica's "Battery")"	"Moonlight Densetsu"	1:08
22.	"Cutie Honey (Note: From "Animetal Lady Sanjō!")"	"Cutie Honey"	0:48
23.	"Mahōtsukai Sally (Note: From "Animetal Lady Sanjō!")"	"Mahōtsukai Sally"	1:00
24.	"Jungle Taitei Leo (Note: From "Animetal Lady Kenzan!")"	"Leo no Uta"	1:41
25.	"Uchū Senkan Yamato (Note: "This Is Animetal" single version)"	"Uchū Senkan Yamato"	1:01
26.	"Kidō Senshi Gundam (Note: Shortened version; incorporates Scorpions' "Blackout")"	"Tobe! Gundam"	0:38
27.	"Densetsu Kyōjin Ideon"	"Fukkatsu no Ideon"	1:04
28.	"Chōjikū Yōsai Macross"	"Macross"	1:35
29.	"Muteki Chōjin Zambot 3"	"Ike! Zambot 3"	1:41
30.	"Muteki Kōjin Daitarn 3 (Note: Incorporates Iron Maiden's "Running Free")"	"Come Here! Daitarn 3"	1:16
31.	"Seisenshi Dunbine"	"Dunbine Tobu"	1:49
32.	"Mazinger Z"	"Mazinger Z"	0:51
33.	"Great Mazinger"	"Ore wa Great Mazinger"	1:04
34.	"UFO Robo Grendizer"	"Tobe! Grendizer"	0:54
35.	"Getter Robo"	"Getter Robo!"	0:56
36.	"Kidō Senshi Gundam Movie II (Note: From "Sentimetal"; incorporates Iron Maiden's "The Number of the Beast")"	"Ai Senshi"	1:38
37.	"Theme of Animetal (Reprise)"		0:53
Total length:			42:22

== Personnel ==
- Eizo Sakamoto - Lead vocals
- Mie - Lead vocals (Animetal Lady)
- She-Ja - Guitar
- Masaki - Bass

with

- Munetaka Higuchi - Drums
- Katsuji - Drums
- Yasuhiro Umezawa - Drums
- Shinki - Drums
