= Kazuya Yoshii =

Japanese musician and singer-songwriter (born 1966)

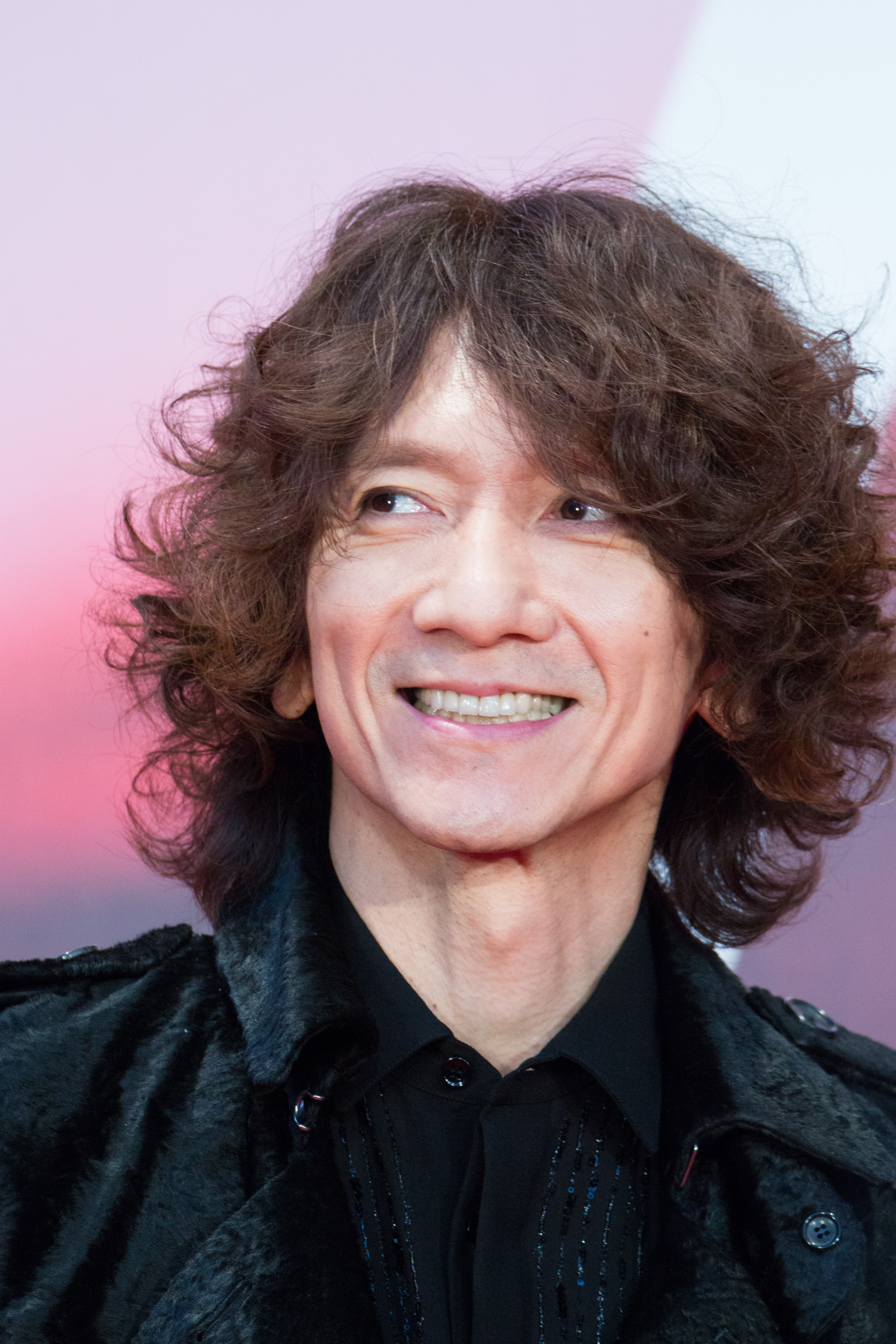
- Yoshii at the 2017 Tokyo International Film Festival

Background information
- Also known as: Yoshii Lovinson, Lovin, Robin
- Born: October 8, 1966 (age 60); Kita, Tokyo, Japan
- Origin: Shizuoka Prefecture
- Genres: Hard rock; alternative rock; glam rock
- Occupations: Musician; singer-songwriter; record producer
- Instruments: Vocals; guitar; bass guitar; drums; keyboards; piano
- Years active: 1986–present
- Labels: Toshiba EMI; Virgin Music/Universal; Triad/Nippon Columbia; Utanova/A-Sketch
- Member of: The Yellow Monkey
- Website: www.yoshiikazuya.com/pc/

Kazuya Yoshii (Japanese: 吉井和哉, Hepburn: Yoshii Kazuya; born October 8, 1966 in Tokyo) is a Japanese musician and singer-songwriter. He is best known as lead vocalist and rhythm guitarist of the rock band The Yellow Monkey. When they went on hiatus in 2001, before officially disbanding three years later, Yoshii started a solo career in 2003 under the name Yoshii Lovinson. He switched back to his old name in 2006 and The Yellow Monkey reformed in 2016.

== Career ==
Yoshii's first band was Urgh Police, which he joined in 1986 as bass guitarist. He was given the nickname "Robin" due to his tall stature being reminiscent of Ratt guitarist Robbin Crosby. After releasing a demo, an EP and one album, the self-proclaimed "Mötley Crüe of Shizuoka" disbanded. Yoshii was the youngest member of Urgh Police, and he said he learned a lot while in the band. In 1988, Yoshii formed a new group called The Yellow Monkey, where he used the nickname "Lovin". Yoshii switched to guitar when he recruited Youichi Hirose as bassist because he liked his personality and playing style. Shortly after their vocalist left due to musical differences, they recruited drummer Eiji Kikuchi's older brother Hideaki as lead guitarist. Yoshii was temporarily providing vocals while they looked for a new singer, but when they received an offer to make a record, he permanently became frontman of the band. The Yellow Monkey had what is regarded as their first concert on December 28, 1989, at Shibuya La Mama.

The Yellow Monkey went on to have three consecutive number one albums and 17 top ten singles. With 10 million records sold, including 6.2 million singles, they were ranked number 81 on HMV's list of the 100 most important Japanese pop acts. The Yellow Monkey went on an indefinite hiatus in January 2001, before officially announcing their disbandment on July 7, 2004.

Yoshii made his solo debut under the name "Yoshii Lovinson" in 2003 with the single "Tali". He took the stage name from Mark Levinson Audio Systems.

He dropped the Yoshii Lovinson name in 2006 and began using his old name with the single "Beautiful". His album 39108 was released on October 4, with the title derived from his age of 39 years old at the time and his October 8 birthday. In 2007, his song "Winner" was used as the theme song for the Japanese version of the film Goal II: Living the Dream.

Yoshii released his first live album Dragon Head Miracle on April 30, 2008. His January 2009 single "Biru Mania" included a cover of "Kuchibiru Motion", which Yoshii wrote for the duo PUFFY two years earlier. The single was followed by his fifth album Volt on March 18.

The single "Love & Peace" was released on February 16, 2011, and a cover of "Betsujin" was contributed to the Reichi Nakaido tribute album OK!!! C'mon Chabo!!! which was released days later. "Love & Peace" was used as the ending theme for the Japanese version of the documentary film Countdown to Zero. His sixth album The Apples was released on April 13, 2011, and followed by his first mini album After the Apples just seven months later.

He covered the song "Razor Sharp・Kireru Yatsu" for the 2012 Kiyoshiro Imawano tribute album King of Songwriter ~Songs of Kiyoshiro Covers~. His 2012 single "Tenbyō no Shikumi" was used as the theme song of the film Key of Life.

In 2014, it was announced that Yoshii would transfer record labels to Triad/Nippon Columbia. He contributed a cover of "Be My Last" for the Hikaru Utada tribute album Utada Hikaru no Uta at the end of the year. The January 2015 single "Clear" was his first official release on Triad, which was the debut label of The Yellow Monkey, although his first cover album Yoshii Funk Jr. ~Korega Genten!!~ was released by Nippon Columbia two months earlier.

His song "Chōzetsu☆Dynamic!", which he composed with lyrics by Yukinojo Mori, is the opening theme song of the Dragon Ball Super anime. It was released as a single on October 7, 2015, with a B-side cover of "Romantic Ageru yo" that features his former Yellow Monkey bandmate Hideaki Kikuchi on guitar. The Yellow Monkey reunited in 2016 and began an arena tour in May.

In 2021, Yoshii formed the record label Utanova Music and signed a partnership deal with A-Sketch.

== Personal life ==
Kazuya Yoshii married his first wife in 1992. They had three daughters and one son before getting divorced in 2008. On June 26, 2015, it was announced that Yoshii married tarento Kaori Manabe who was pregnant with his child and due to give birth in the fall. Their marriage certificate was submitted in September and Kaori gave birth on October 20, 2015. He first met Manabe, who is fourteen years his junior and has been a fan of Yellow Monkey since middle school, in autumn 2011.

At the end of December 2021, Yoshii visited a specialist after feeling something strange in his throat and was diagnosed with a polyp caused by inflammation. After canceling all scheduled performances, he underwent surgery to remove it in February 2022. However, another polyp was discovered and removed six months later, followed by a third that was removed in October. After testing at a university in November, Yoshii was diagnosed with early stage laryngeal cancer. He was treated and deemed cancer free by the beginning of 2023.

== Discography ==
=== Studio albums ===
- At the Black Hole (February 11, 2004), Oricon Albums Chart Peak Position: No. 3
- White Room (March 9, 2005) No. 4
- 39108 (October 4, 2006) No. 2
- Hummingbird in Forest of Space (September 5, 2007) No. 8
- Volt (March 18, 2009) No. 7
- The Apples (April 13, 2011) No. 1
- After the Apples (November 16, 2011, mini album) No. 3
- Starlight (March 18, 2015) No. 2

=== Singles ===
- "Tali" (October 1, 2003), Oricon Singles Chart Peak Position: No. 2
- "Sweet Candy Rain" (January 9, 2004) No. 2
- "Tobuyouni" (トブヨウニ; July 28, 2004) No. 8
- "Call Me" (January 13, 2005) No. 2
- "Beautiful" (January 25, 2006) No. 9
- "Winner" (May 23, 2007) No. 5
- "Shine and Eternity" (July 25, 2007) No. 6
- "Shredder" (シュレッダー; August 22, 2007) No. 9
- "Bakka" (バッカ; December 19, 2007) No. 4
- "Biru Mania" (ビルマニア; January 28, 2009) No. 4
- "Love & Peace" (February 16, 2011) No. 5
- "Tenbyō no Shikumi" (点描のしくみ; August 29, 2012) No. 15
- "Clear" (クリア; January 28, 2015) No. 6
- "Chōzetsu☆Dynamic!" (超絶☆ダイナミック!; October 7, 2015) No. 13

=== Other albums ===
- Dragon Head Miracle (April 30, 2008, live album) No. 12
- At the Sweet Basil (December 18, 2013, live album) No. 9
- 18 (January 23, 2013, compilation album) No. 4
- Yoshii Funk Jr. ~Korega Genten!!~ (ヨシー・ファンクJr. 〜此レガ原点!!〜; November 19, 2014, cover album) No. 4
- SuperNoVacation (May 27, 2015, compilation album) No. 17
- Yozzy Kazborn ~Ura Setsu Rino Machi~ (ヨジー・カズボーン～裏切リノ街～; December 9, 2015, cover album) No. 12
- Soundtrack ~Beginning & The End~ (June 13, 2018, live album) No. 7
- 20 (September 13, 2023, compilation album) No. 8
- 20th Anniversary 7 Inch Single Complete Box (December 6, 2023, 10-record vinyl box set)

=== With Urgh Police ===
- Demo (1985)
- Crazy Rock 'n' Roller (1986)
- Urgh (1987)

=== Other work ===
- All Apologies (2006): cover of "Polly" for the Nirvana tribute album
- PUFFY - "Oriental Diamond/Kuchibiru Motion" (2007): wrote and composed "Kuchibiru Motion"
- Unicorn Tribute (2007): cover of "Ataeru Otoko" for the Unicorn tribute album
- Love Love Love (2009): cover of "Help!" for The Beatles tribute album
- OK!!! C'mon Chabo!!! (2011): cover of "Betsujin"
- Tamio Okuda - "Kobushi wo Ten ni Tsukiagero" (2012): chorus
- King of Songwriter ~Songs of Kiyoshiro Covers~ (2012): cover of "Razor Sharp・Kireru Yatsu"
- Utada Hikaru no Uta (2014): cover of "Be My Last"
- T. Rex Tribute ~Sitting Next To You~ (2017): cover of "The Prettiest Star" for the T. Rex tribute album
- Marie Ueda - Heartbreaker (2020): poetry reading on "Kagiana"
- Tomoyasu Hotei - "Dangerous" (2020): featured on the song from the album Soul to Soul
- Bish - "Bye-Bye Show" (2023): wrote and produced the song
