= The Yellow Monkey =

Japanese rock band

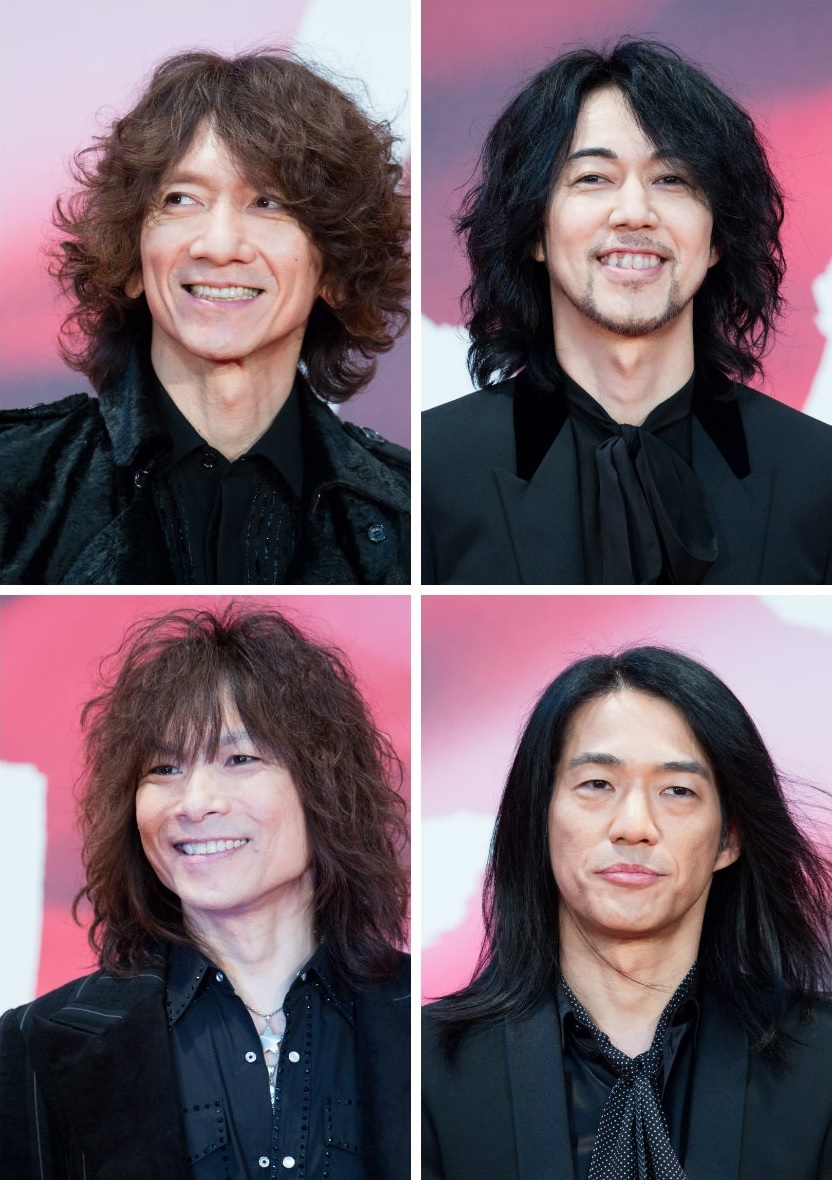
- The Yellow Monkey at the Tokyo International Film Festival on October 25, 2017. Clockwise, from top left: Kazuya Yoshii, Hideaki Kikuchi, Eiji Kikuchi, Yoichi Hirose

Background information
- Also known as: Yemon
- Origin: Tokyo, Japan
- Genres: Hard rock; glam rock; alternative rock
- Works: Discography
- Years active: 1988–2004, 2016–present
- Labels: Triad/Nippon Columbia, BMG Funhouse/Ariola Japan, Atlantic/Warner Music Japan
- Members: Kazuya Yoshii; Hideaki Kikuchi; Yoichi Hirose; Eiji Kikuchi
- Website: theyellowmonkeysuper.jp

The Yellow Monkey, sometimes abbreviated as Yemon (Japanese: イエモン, Hepburn: Iemon), is a Japanese rock band originally active from 1988 to 2001, before officially disbanding in 2004. They announced their reformation in 2016.

The band's name was derived from the ethnic slur that Japanese people look like monkeys, and that Asian people are said to be "yellow" in skin color. The Yellow Monkey is considered an important Japanese rock group, having achieved major success selling 10 million records, including 6.2 million singles. The group has had three consecutive number one albums, 18 top ten singles and in 2003 were ranked number 81 on HMV's list of the 100 most important Japanese pop acts. Outside Japan the band is best known for their song "Tactics", one of the many ending themes of the Rurouni Kenshin anime.

== History ==
=== 1988–1994: The Beginning ===
The Yellow Monkey has its roots in 1988, formed by Kazuya Yoshii when his previous band Urgh Police disbanded. When fellow heavy metal band Murbas disbanded, Yoshii switched from bass to guitar and recruited their bassist Youichi Hirose because he liked his personality and playing style. Similarly, drummer Eiji Kikuchi joined when his band Killer May disbanded. After vocalist Kenichi Matsuo (ex-Shock) left due to musical differences, they recruited Eiji's older brother Hideaki (also formerly of Killer May) as lead guitarist. Yoshii was temporarily providing vocals while they looked for a new singer, but when they received an offer to make a record, he permanently became frontman of the band.

The Yellow Monkey started to play in the underground circuit, being well known for not only their latent songwriting quality, but also because of their live performances, which would soon become the main characteristics of the group. A December 28, 1989 show at Shibuya La Mama is regarded as the first with these four members. The fans of the band grew vertiginously, preparing the band for their first studio work.

In 1991, the band finally launched their first album, Bunched Birth, which had seven original songs. It was an independently released album with raw sonority, with many influences from hard rock, and containing well-shaped but peculiar lyrics (all of them written by Yoshii). The work was very well received by the public, opening the doors for their major label debut album, The Night Snails and Plastic Boogie, of 1992 on Triad/Nippon Columbia. The new album brought eleven songs more elaborate than the first work. The band had a considerable increase in popularity, which added to single "Romantist Taste" and to the ballad "Pearl Light of Revolution", that already gave samples of the potential of Kazuya in composing powerful ballads.

In 1993, the band launched their second major album, Experience Movie. The songs had a better production and care with the sonority. The songs of the album were very strong and with high emotional text. The band also started to be admired for their live performances, due to the band's charisma and Kazuya's extreme performances. However, the band had not yet become a large public success in Japan.

In 1994, they released the concept album Jaguar Hard Pain 1944–1994. It tells the saga of Jaguar, a World War II soldier who died in combat and comes back to life in the present day and tries to find his love, Mary. This was the last album from the first period of the band, when their songs did not have as much popular sound appeal.

=== 1995–2000: The Success ===
By the year 1995, The Yellow Monkey had already become successful in Japan, playing their first show at the Nippon Budokan on April 11. They released the album Smile, which was another critical and public success, and the band released the single "Love Communication". Other songs that became classics of the band are "Fantasy" (Nagekunari Waga Yoru no Fantasy), "Scorching Night" (Nettaiya), the powerful ballad "Hard Rain" and "Venus's Flower" (Venus no Hana). The tour for this album in Japan booked more than 40 major shows.

When it seemed that the band would rest, at the end of that same year, they released the album Four Seasons, which was recorded in London. The album reached No. 1 on the Oricon charts. The album had more-accessible songs, and reached a warm reception by the fans. There were also fans of anime because the song "Tactics" was used as the first ending theme of the Rurouni Kenshin anime, becoming their most successful single up until that point. Many other classics were already identified, such as "The Sun Is Burning" (Taiyō ga Moeteiru), the rock-and-roll track "I Love You Baby" and songs such as "Father", "Remembering a Mermaid" (Tsuioku no Mermaid) and "The Moon Song" (Tsuki no Uta). Despite the thundering success of the record, The Yellow Monkey continued being a cult band, since their lyrics and live performances remained consistent. On May 5, 1996, they performed in London with The Spiders from Mars.

After two back-to-back album releases, the band decided to take a break for one year. The decision was aided by Kazuya's stress from the constant and exhausting work of the two previous albums. The compilation album Triad Years Act 1 was released and was certified by the RIAJ for sales of a million copies. They also changed record labels to BMG Funhouse/Ariola Japan. On December 28, 1996, the seventh anniversary of what they consider their first concert, The Yellow Monkey held a special concert at the Nippon Budokan titled Mekara Uroko 7, where they played older songs. According to Kazuya, performing "Pearl Light of Revolution" with an orchestral arrangement at the show was one of the best moments of his career. The band continued to sporadically use the Mekara Uroko (メカラ ウロコ) name for special concerts and events, which were usually held on December 28.

In 1997, The Yellow Monkey came back with the album that is considered their magnum opus, Sicks. This album brought a different sonority compared to the two previous works. It was a mix of their current sound combined with that of their first albums. Bringing more complex and mature songs, Sicks, was an amazing critical success and repeated the sales of the previous album. The main characteristic of the record is the concern of the band with the arrangements, which becomes more evident already in the first track, "Rainbow Man". The only single of the album was "Rakuen", which was successful and is still one of their best known songs. Despite being a concise album, whose songs are all equivalent in quality, there are three songs that made the album legendary. The first one is the already cited "Rakuen", with a strong chorus. "Rakuen" ("Paradise") was covered by Eric Martin, known as Mr. Big vocalist, in his album Mr. Rock Vocalist released in 2012. The second is the ballad "End of Life (for Grandmother)" (Jinsei no Owari (for Grandmother)), considered by many as the best ballad by The Yellow Monkey. The third song is the long eight-minute epic, "Trip in Heaven" (Tengoku Ryokou), again considered among the best songs of the group.

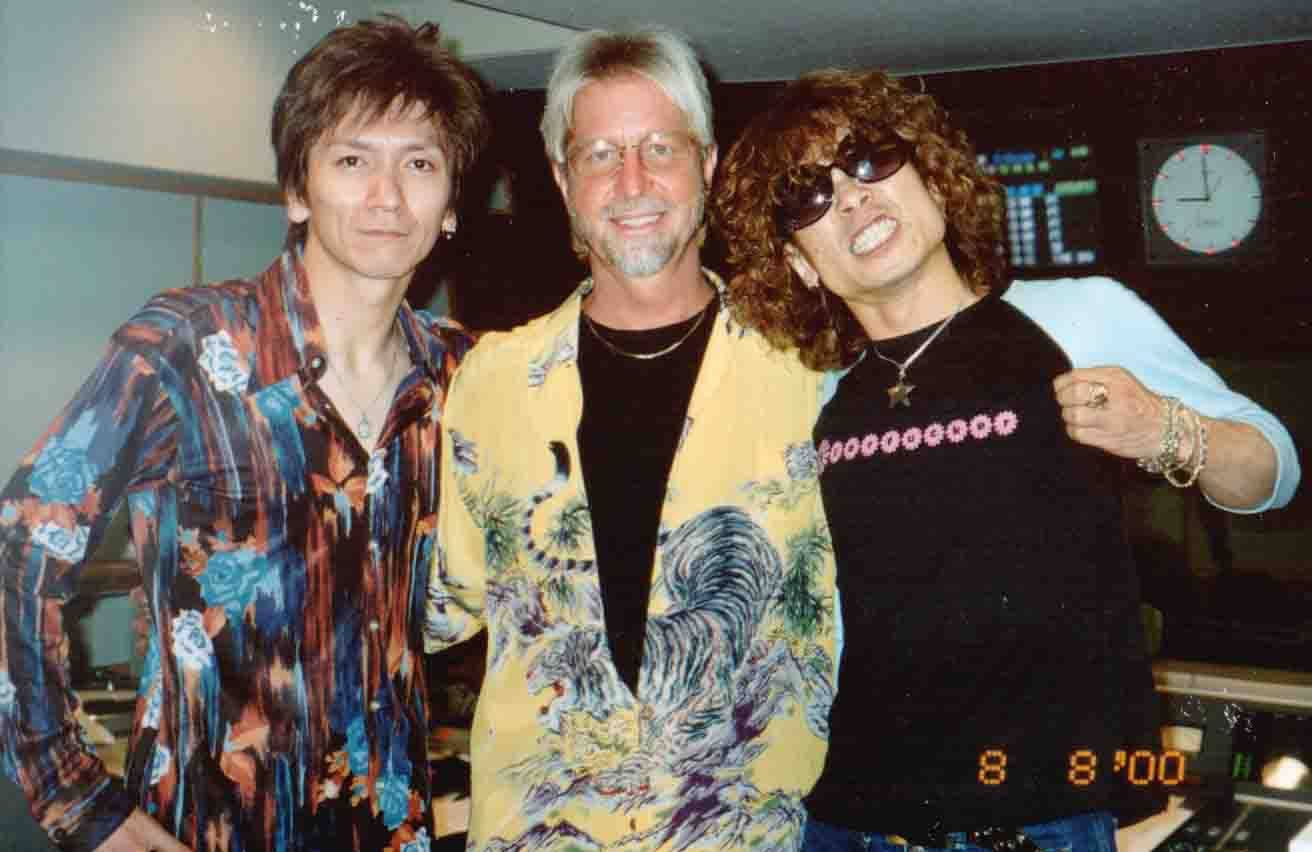
Yoshii and Hirose with Kamasami Kong (center), c. 2001

The band released the commercially successful album Punch Drunkard in 1998, although not to the extent of their previous album, it was named one of the top albums from 1989 to 1998 in a 2004 issue of the music magazine Band Yarouze. The singles "Kyūkon" ("Bulb"), "Burn", and "Love Love Show" became hits. Although containing accessible songs, the album used the song-writing method of the previous album, Sicks. The success of the album made it possible for the band to begin a large tour of 113 concerts, the most of their career, which continued into 1999. They also did a small, two-date tour of the United Kingdom in July 1998, and held Mekara Uroko 9 at the Nippon Budokan on December 28, 1998.

After completing the extensive Punch Drunkard tour in March 1999, the group took the rest of the year off; performing only two more concerts. This included Mekara Uroko 10 at the Nippon Budokan on December 28, which featured guest musicians and celebrated their tenth anniversary. Coming back in 2000, the Yellow Monkey released their last studio album, 8, and released many singles such as "Holy Sea and Sunshine" (Seinaru Umi to Sunshine), "Pearl", "Rosy Days" (Barairo no Hibi) and "Shock Hearts", all of which achieved great success. The album is considered the most occidental of the band, which was common for all Japanese bands at the time. Despite the success of the album, the group performed only the 10-date Spring Tour, already showing that the end was coming.

=== 2001–2004: The End and post-activities ===
In 2001, The Yellow Monkey began a hiatus for an indefinite period of time after performing their final concerts at the Osaka Dome on January 4, and at the Tokyo Dome on January 8. Both were titled Mekara Uroko 8, in reference to their latest album. January 31 saw the release of their last single, "Primal.", which was produced by Tony Visconti. The compilation album Golden Years Singles 1996–2001 followed in June. The members released many solo albums, with Kazuya continuing to have success and adopting the stage name of Yoshii Lovinson, which he abandoned some years later. Hirose also obtained relative success with his band, Heesey with Dudes. Annie teamed up with Anchang (Sex Machineguns) and Natchin (Siam Shade) to form the trio Big Bites. Hideaki formed the loose musical collaboration project brainchild's.

In 2004, the band released a large compilation Mother of All the Best, which included three discs with some singles, all b-sides, some demo-version songs and live performances. The Yellow Monkey officially announced their disbandment on July 7, 2004. However, the four members got together one last time for the final day of The Exhibition and Video Festival of The Yellow Monkey Mekara Uroko 15 held at the Tokyo Dome on December 26, 2004, and performed "Jam".

A two-disc tribute album titled This is For You ~ The Yellow Monkey Tribute Album was released on December 9, 2009, featuring artists such as Mucc, Fujifabric, 9mm Parabellum Bullet, Morgan Fisher and Kreva. Their song "Jam" was covered by Chemical Pictures on the album Crush! 2 -90's V-Rock Best Hit Cover Songs-, which was released on November 23, 2011.

In 2012, a remix of their first single was released in celebration of the 20th anniversary of their major label debut. Mastered by Ted Jensen, "Romantist Taste 2012" was released on October 10.

A documentary film of their 113 date tour from April 1998 to March 1999 was released in theaters nationwide in 2013, titled Pandora: The Yellow Monkey Punch Drunkard Tour The Movie. It includes an interview with all four members together, the first time since the band broke up.

=== 2016–present: The Reformation ===
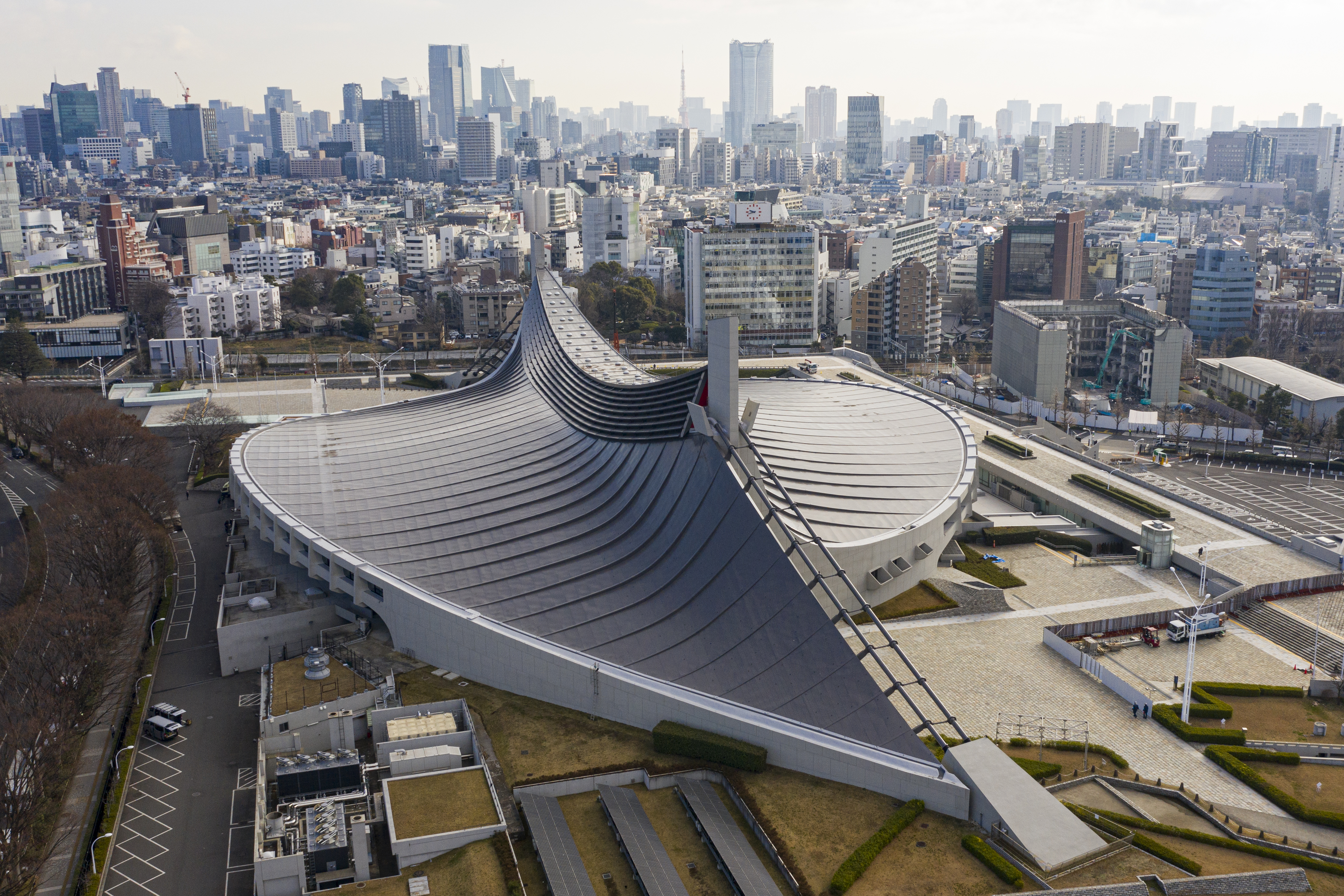
The Yellow Monkey performed their first concert in 15 years at Yoyogi National Gymnasium.

Rumors began circulating about the band reforming after the appearance of a mysterious website with a picture of a cocoon and a timer counting down to January 8, 2016. Various clues on the page led to the notion of the band reuniting, including GPS coordinates of the venue where they held their first concert. It was confirmed on January 8 that The Yellow Monkey would reform for a twenty-date arena tour, beginning with their first concert in fifteen years on May 11 at the Yoyogi National Gymnasium. It was Yoshii who initiated the reunion when he emailed the other members about it after seeing The Rolling Stones perform in London in 2013. Their first new song, "Alright", debuted on the radio on February 10, 2016. "Alright" is included as the B-side on their first single since reuniting, "Tower of Sand" ("Suna no Tō"), which was released on October 19, 2016. The year saw them perform 42 concerts to over 360,000 people, including Mekara Uroko 27 at the Nippon Budokan on December 28. It also saw them set up Barairo Bokin (バラ色募金), a charity fund that supports various organizations for disaster-stricken areas, medical support, and children through donation boxes set up at their concert venues and a portion of their merchandise sales. The Yellow Monkey were honored with a Special Award at the 58th Japan Record Awards in 2016, and the Best Respect Artist award at the 2017 Space Shower Music Awards for their influence and achievements in music.

In celebration of the 25th anniversary of their major label debut, the self-cover album The Yellow Monkey is Here. New Best was released on May 21, 2017. It features new recordings of the first sixteen songs from 2013's Yemon -Fan's Best Selection-, the track list of which was voted on by fans. A special edition of the album includes a second CD of the new song "Rosanna". The Yellow Monkey recorded a cover of David Bowie's "Ziggy Stardust" released exclusively on Amazon.co.jp. It was first released digitally on September 13, 2017, with a made-to-order 7-inch record coupled with a live recording of the same song released on January 8, 2018. A song called "Stars" was released digitally on October 27, 2017. "Horizon", the theme song of the film Ototoki, was released digitally on November 29 as the final part of three consecutive monthly releases. On December 9 and 10, The Yellow Monkey performed at the Tokyo Dome for the first time in 17 years. December 28 saw Mekara Uroko 28 -Kyushu Special- held at the Fukuoka Yafuoku! Dome.

In October 2018, it was announced that the band had signed with Atlantic/Warner Music Japan. The Yellow Monkey's catalog was made available on digital services worldwide on November 9. That same day, the new song "Ladybug" ("Tentomushi") was released. The band performed only a single concert that year; Mekara Uroko 29 -Final- at the Nippon Budokan on December 28, where they announced they would not be performing any more concerts under the Mekara Uroko title. The digital song "I Don't Know" was released on January 25, 2019. Their tenth studio album and first in 19 years, 9999, was released on April 17 and supported by a lengthy nationwide arena tour from April to September. It was named Album of the Year at the 61st Japan Record Awards. On August 6, the band performed a surprise concert at Shibuya La Mama, where they played their first gig almost 30 years earlier, limited to 250 people. In celebration of their 30th anniversary, they released an expanded version of 9999 and planned four dome concerts between December 28, 2019, and April 5, 2020. However, the April 4 and 5 Tokyo Dome concerts were cancelled due to the COVID-19 pandemic in Japan. Four additional anniversary dome concerts were held between November 3 and December 28, and were released on home video in March 2021. The band's first live album in over 20 years, Live Loud, was released in February 2021 with a track list decided by fan votes.

All four members of The Yellow Monkey contributed to the March 2023 single "Bye-Bye Show" by the idol group Bish. Yoshii wrote and produced the song, while the other three perform on the track. In October 2023, Yoshii revealed that he had three surgeries to remove what were believed to be polyps from his throat between February and October 2022. After further testing, he was diagnosed with early stage laryngeal cancer, treated and deemed cancer free by the beginning of 2023. The Yellow Monkey released the song "Hotel Neutrino" digitally on January 1, 2024, followed by "Shine On" on April 3. They held their first concert in three years at the Tokyo Dome on April 27, and released their eleventh studio album Sparkle X on May 29. On October 15, the group began their first large-scale hall tour in 25 years. Continuing into 2025 and consisting of 30 concerts, the tour was divided into four "blocks"; the first and second featured songs from Jaguar Hard Pain 1944–1994 and Smile, respectively, to commemorate each album's 30th anniversary, the third ended with their first concert at NHK Hall in 27 years, while the final block ended on June 13, 2025. The Yellow Monkey's 26th single, "Cat City", was released on July 9 and was written to be the theme song of the Night of the Living Cat anime adaptation. They then performed with B'z at their Unite #02 event at K-Arena Yokohama on June 21, and at the 2025 Lunatic Fest, hosted by Luna Sea at Makuhari Messe in November.

== Musical style ==
Yū Aoki of M-ON! Music wrote that The Yellow Monkey's sound is based in glam rock and hard rock. Rockin'On's Tomoki Takahashi noted that while all four members originated in the 1980s' Japanese metal scene, their sound blends elements of David Bowie, T. Rex, Lou Reed, and the New York Dolls. This comparison continues in their use of fashion and makeup, giving them a prominent visual image. However, Aoki wrote that, despite this Western influence, The Yellow Monkey consciously uses uniquely Japanese expressions via melody, lyrics, and themes. Aoki also noted how the band has many instances of eros and decadent concepts in their works, particularly early in their career. Vocalist Yoshii, the principal songwriter in The Yellow Monkey, cites Keisuke Kuwata, vocalist and principal songwriter of Southern All Stars, as a huge influence on his lyrics, including the use of sexual expressions. Takahashi wrote that the decadent aesthetics and worldview remain at the core of the band, as does a deep musicality.

== Members ==
Current members

- Kazuya "Lovin" Yoshii (吉井和哉) – vocals, guitar
- Hideaki "Emma" Kikuchi (菊地英昭) – guitar, backing vocals
- Yoichi "Heesey" Hirose (廣瀬洋一) – bass, backing vocals
- Eiji "Annie" Kikuchi (菊地英二) – drums

Support members

- Yoshitaka Mikuni (三国義貴) – keyboards (1994–2001, 2024)
- Takashi Tsurutani (鶴谷崇) – keyboards (2016–present)

== Discography ==
- Bunched Birth (July 21, 1991), Oricon Albums Chart Peak Position: No. 40 (1996 reissue)
- The Night Snails and Plastic Boogie (June 21, 1992) No. 79
- Experience Movie (March 1, 1993) No. 80
- Jaguar Hard Pain 1944–1994 (March 1, 1994) No. 28
- Smile (February 1, 1995) No. 4
- Four Seasons (November 1, 1995) No. 1
- Sicks (January 22, 1997) No. 1
- Punch Drunkard (March 4, 1998) No. 1
- 8 (July 26, 2000) No. 2
- 9999 (April 17, 2019) No. 3 (Note: Note that Oricon combines April 2019's 9999 and December 2019's expanded version 9999+1 together. Thus it lists 9999 as reaching number 2 on December 16, 2019. However, that was actually 9999+1.)
- Sparkle X (May 29, 2024) No. 1

== Awards ==
Year	Award	Category	Recipient or nominee	Result
1997	1997 MTV Video Music Awards	International Viewer's Choice - Japan	"Rakuen"	Nominated
2016	2016 MTV Video Music Awards Japan	Inspiration Award Japan	The Yellow Monkey	Won
2016	2016 MTV Video Music Awards Japan	Best Group Video - Japan	"Alright"	Nominated
2016	2016 MTV Video Music Awards Japan	Best Rock Video	"Alright"	Nominated
2016	49th Japan Cable Awards	Special Award	"Spark" and "Tower of Sand"	Won
2016	58th Japan Record Awards	Special Award	The Yellow Monkey	Won
2017	Space Shower Music Awards	Best Respect Artist	The Yellow Monkey	Won
2017	9th CD Shop Awards	Live Video Award	The Yellow Monkey Super Japan Tour 2016 -Saitama Super Arena 2016.7.10-	Won
2018	Space Shower Music Awards	Best Group Artist	The Yellow Monkey	Nominated
2019	61st Japan Record Awards	Album of the Year	9999	Won
2020	12th CD Shop Awards	Winning work	9999	Won
2020	Space Shower Music Awards	Best Group Artist	The Yellow Monkey	Nominated
2020	Space Shower Music Awards	Album of the Year	9999	Won
