= Hideaki Kikuchi =

Japanese guitarist

Hideaki Kikuchi 菊地英昭
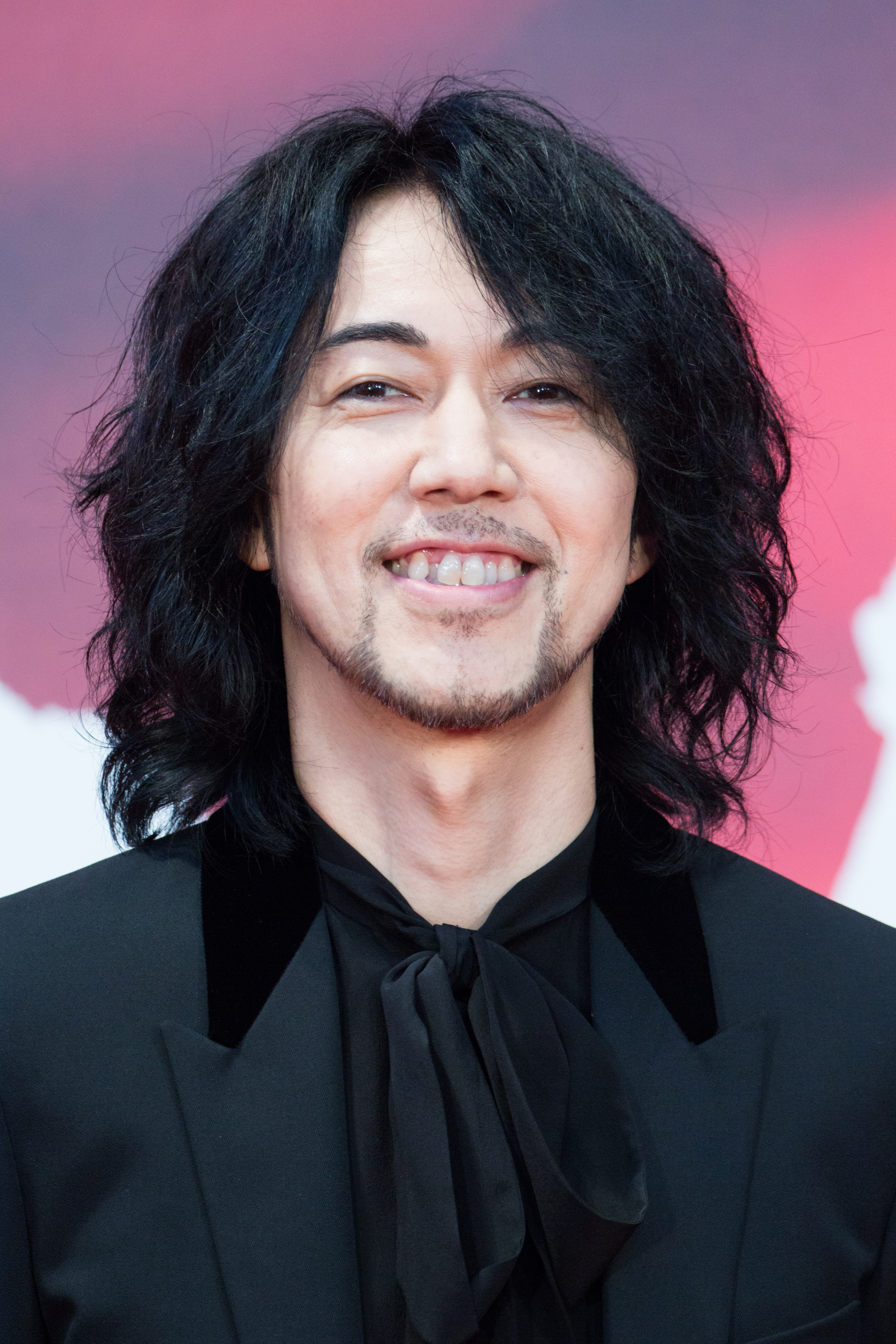
- At the 30th Tokyo International Film Festival (October 2017)

Background information
- Also known as: Emma
- Born: December 7, 1964 (age 61); Hino, Tokyo, Japan
- Genres: Hard rock; alternative rock
- Occupations: Guitarist; songwriter
- Instruments: Guitar; backing vocals
- Years active: 1984–present
- Labels: Triad/Nippon Columbia; BMG Funhouse/Ariola Japan; Atlantic/Warner Music Japan
- Website: www.baj-inc.com#/artist/

Hideaki Kikuchi (菊地英昭, Kikuchi Hideaki; born December 7, 1964) is a Japanese musician. Born in Hino, Tokyo, he was raised in Hachiōji. He is best known as lead guitarist of the rock band The Yellow Monkey.

== Career ==
Hideaki "Emma" Kikuchi graduated from Nihon University, Faculty of Arts and Sciences, Department of Geography. In December 1986, he made his major debut as the lead guitarist of Killer May. The band's drummer, Eiji "Annie" Kikuchi, is his younger brother. Killer May disbanded in March 1989.

In 1989, Kikuchi was invited by his younger brother Eiji to join as lead guitarist and backing vocalist of the rock band The Yellow Monkey. He officially debuted with the band on December 28, 1989, at Shibuya La.Mama. In 1992, The Yellow Monkey went major and slowly rose to great success until their hiatus in 2001. In July 2004, the band disbanded. From 2004 to 2007, Kikuchi recorded with and live-supported Kazuya Yoshii, vocalist of The Yellow Monkey. He has provided occasional live support for Kōji Kikkawa since 2007.

He participated as a guitarist in Yoshii's second album White Room released in March 2005 (credited as EMMARSON). He was also in charge of the guitar for the theme song of the movie Taiyō ni Hoero!. His agency is BAJ INC. (Formerly BOWINMAN ARTISTS).

Kikuchi established the indie label "Brainchild's Music" in October 2008. It is a loose musical collaboration project.

On January 8, 2016, The Yellow Monkey reunited and Kikuchi resumed his position as lead guitarist.

== Highlights ==
- Kikuchi admires Aerosmith guitarist Joe Perry, and his style is strongly influenced by Perry.
- During The Yellow Monkey era, he composed several songs such as "空の青と本当の気持ち" (Blue Sky and True Mind), "TV Singer," and "Sexless." There are also several songs co-written with Yoshii, such as "This ls For You", "創生児" (Twins), and "クズ社会の赤いバラ" (Red Rose in a Dump) .

== Books ==
Kikuchi wrote the following books:

- Hideaki Kikuchi - Let The Music Do The Talking (2001) Shinko Music (ISBN 4401616995).
  - This is a compilation of serializations at the New Rudy's Club (renamed from the September 2000 issue, ROCK JET).
- Hideaki Kikuchi - Let The Music Do The Talking II (2013)
  - It consists of 45 serializations from the winter 2001 issue to the winter 2012 issue of "ROCK JET" magazine, with new interviews (instead of "Conclusion") added to the selection from live interviews.
