= Tokyo Laboratory =

Japanese film and print company

Tokyo Laboratory Ltd.
- Trade name: togen
- Native name: 株式会社東京現像所
- Romanized name: Kabushiki gaisha Tōkyō Genzōsho
- Type: Private KK
- Industry: Theatrical film
- Founded: April 22, 1955; 71 years ago
- Defunct: November 30, 2023; 2 years ago
- Headquarters: Chōfu, Tokyo, Japan
- Owner: Hankyu Hanshin Toho Group
- Parent: Toho (75%)
- Website: www.tokyolab.co.jp

Tokyo Laboratory Ltd. (株式会社東京現像所, Kabushiki gaisha Tōkyō Genzōsho; doing business as Togen (stylized as togen) was a Japanese theatrical film developing and print production company established in 1955 and headquartered in Chōfu, Tokyo, Japan. In addition, the company also processed visual effects and other special effects, conversion from one film or video format to another, subtitling and other titling (such as opening and closing credits), telecine conversion, video editing, VHS duplication, and DVD production.

In addition, Tokyo Laboratory had processed many films from Taiwan and Mainland China throughout its history. Such films include Red Sorghum, Farewell My Concubine, In the Heat of the Sun etc.

In September 2023, Tokyo Laboratory announced that it will shut down after 68 years in November 2023.

== Clients ==
Tokyo Laboratory had worked for a variety of clients, including the following:

- Hankyū Tōhō Group and its successor, the Hankyu Hanshin Toho Group
- Shin-Ei Animation
- Tokyo Metropolitan Nishi High School

== Projects ==
Tokyo Laboratory had worked on a variety of 166 projects, including the following:

- King Kong vs. Godzilla (1962)
- Matango (1963)
- Ultraman (1966–1967)
- Miracle Girls (1993)
- Ask Dr. Rin! (2001–2002)

rest in alphabetical order:

- Ah! My Goddess: The Movie
- Adventures of Pinocchio
- Amada Anime Series: Super Mario Bros.
- Anpanman
- Alice SOS
- Astro Boy (3rd TV series)
- Ask Dr. Rin! (TV series)
- Atashin'chi
- Andersen Monogatari (TV series)
- Anmitsu Hime (TV series)
- Arabian Nights: Sinbad's Adventures
- Belle et Sébastien
- Cardcaptor Sakura (TV series)
- Cardcaptor Sakura: Clear Card (TV series)
- Chinpui
- Chouseishin Series
- Clamp School Detectives (TV series)
- Corrector Yui (TV series)
- Crash B-Daman
- Crayon Shin-chan
- Cyber Team in Akihabara
- Digimon Tamers
- Digimon Frontier
- Dokaben
- Doraemon
- Edonaka-machi Bugyōsho
- Esper Mami
- F-Zero GP Legend
- Full Moon o Sagashite
- Fushigi Yuugi
- Ganbare, Kickers!
- Gatapishi
- Genji Tsūshin Agedama
- Grave of the Fireflies
- Gridman the Hyper Agent
- Hamtaro (OVA)
- High School! Kimengumi
- I'm Gonna Be An Angel!
- Ikkyū-san
- Itsuka Giragira-suru Hi
- Kochira Katsushika-ku Kameari Kōen-mae Hashutsujo
- Kodocha
- Lupin III (TV series 1-3)
- Little Nemo: Adventures in Slumberland
- Little Lulu and Her Little Friends
- Lupin III: Dead or Alive
- Lupin III: Farewell to Nostradamus
- Floral Magician Mary Bell
- Gauche the Cellist
- Hime-chan's Ribbon
- Jankenman
- Jarinko Chie
- Lupin III: The Plot of the Fuma Clan
- Kaitou Saint Tail
- Kamikaze Kaitou Jeanne
- Lupin III: Strange Psychokinetic Strategy
- Magic Knight Rayearth (TV series)
- Magical Princess Minky Momo
- Creamy Mami, the Magic Angel
- Persia, the Magic Fairy
- Magical Emi, the Magic Star
- Pastel Yumi, the Magic Idol
- Magical Angel Sweet Mint
- Mermaid Melody Pichi Pichi Pitch (TV series)
- Mega Man: Upon a Star
- Mahōjin Guru Guru
- Mister Ajikko
- Moomin (1969 TV series)
- Mon Colle Knights
- My Neighbor Totoro
- Nausicaä of the Valley of the Wind
- Nanamagari Sōsaichi Gakari
- Neon Genesis Evangelion
- New Cutie Honey
- Ninja Hattori-kun
- Nurse no Shigoto
- Nurse Angel Ririka SOS
- Noozles
- Osomatsu-kun
- Otoko Ippiki Gaki Daishō
- Ox Tales
- Pāman
- Panda! Go, Panda!
- Post no Naka no Asu
- Powerpuff Girls Z
- Pretty Cure (series)
- Prince of Tennis
- Princess Comet (2nd Drama and TV Series)
- Ranma ½
- Shōnen Ashibe
- Shimajiro (series)
- Spoon Obasan
- Sonic X
- Super Doll Licca-chan
- Super Robot Red Baron
- Super Robot Mach Baron
- The Genie Family
- The Snow Queen
- The Great Adventure of Horus, Prince of the Sun
- The Wonderful Wizard of Oz
- The Legend of Zorro
- Tobenai Hotaru
- Tonde Burin
- Tokyo Mew Mew
- Totsugeki! Papparatai
- Ultra Series (Ultraman to Ultraman 80)
- Unico
- Urusei Yatsura
- Warrior of Love Rainbowman
- Yakyūkyō no Uta
- YAT Anshin! Uchū Ryokō
- Yu-Gi-Oh! series
- Yūkai
