= Mitsuaki Hoshino =

Japanese actor and voice actor (born 1959)

- Born: February 19, 1959 (age 67); Shizuoka Prefecture, Japan
- Occupations: Actor, voice actor
- Years active: 1985–present
- Spouse: Yūko Kobayashi

Mitsuaki Hoshino (星野 充昭, Hoshino Mitsuaki; born February 19, 1959 in Shizuoka) is a Japanese actor and voice actor who works for Arts Vision. He is married to Yūko Kobayashi.

== Filmography ==
=== Anime series ===
- Kyojin no Hoshi (xxxx) (Tetsuharu Kawakami)
- Touch (1985) (Ishigaki, Nagao)
- Magical Emi, the Magic Star (1985) (Okubo)
- Grimm's Fairy Tale Classics (1988) (Servant)
- Mobile Suit Gundam 0080: War in the Pocket (1989) (Andy)
- Brave Exkaiser (1990) (Dash Max)
- Kekko Kamen (1991) (Teacher Ben)
- The Brave Fighter of Legend Da-Garn (1992) (Jumbo Saber)
- Black Jack (1993) (Soldier)
- Brave Police J-Decker (1994) (Dumpson, Daisaku Omura)
- Slayers (1995) (Innkeeper)
- Agent Aika (1997) (Bodyguard)
- Rurouni Kenshin: Tsuiokuhen (1999) (Katagai)
- Pecola (2001) (Gao-san)
- Ghost in the Shell: Stand Alone Complex (2002) (Sakakibara)
- Heat Guy J (2002) (Alan Milchan)
- Hikaru no Go (2003) (Hirose, many others)
- Uninhabited Planet Survive! (2004) (Bob)
- Gallery Fake (2005) (Seiji Fujita)
- Kamichu! (2005) (Kenkichi Hitotsubashi)
- D.Gray-man (2006) (Jake Russell)
- Coyote Ragtime Show (2006) (Chief)
- The Story of Saiunkoku (2006) (Governor of Haku Province)
- Yomigaeru Sora – Rescue Wings (2006) (Ryunosuke Murakami)
- Devil May Cry (2007) (Bartender, Fredi)
- Spice and Wolf (2008) (Clothing Shop Owner)
- Stitch! (2009) (Kantoku)
- One Piece (2009) (Magellan)
- Kuroshitsuji II (2010) (Arnold Trancy)
- Steins;Gate (2011) (Eisuke Urushibara)
- The Idolmaster (2011) (Reporter Yoshizawa)
- Blue Exorcist (2011) (Hoshino)
- Gintama (2011) (Admiral Abo)
- AKB0048: Next Stage (2013) (Tokusan)
- Haikyu!! (2014) (Nobuteru Irihata)
- The Heroic Legend of Arslan (2015) (Zaravant)
- Gate: Jieitai Kano Chi nite, Kaku Tatakaeri (2015) (US President Dirrel)
- The Idolmaster Cinderella Girls (2015) (Reporter Yoshizawa)
- Plastic Memories (2015) (Mikijiro Tetsuguro)
- Active Raid (2016) (Kazuyoshi Terao)
- 100% Pascal-sensei (2017) (Principal)
- Violet Evergarden (2018) (Le Verrier)
- Banana Fish (2018) (Jim Callenreese)
- Mob Psycho 100 II (2019) (Masashi Asagiri)
- King of Prism: Shiny Seven Stars (2019) (Yō Takahashi)
- Beastars (2019) (Mayor)
- Healin' Good Pretty Cure (2020-2021) (Kawai)
- Komi Can't Communicate (2021) (Masayoshi Komi)

=== Anime films ===
- Mobile Suit Gundam: Char's Counterattack (1988) (Officer)
- Venus Wars (1989) (Manuel)
- Black Jack: The Movie (1996) (Eric Caderi)

=== Video games ===
- Lego Island (1997) (Enter)
- Tenchu (xxxx) (Balmer)
- Valkyrie Profile (xxxx) (Badluck, Surt)

=== Drama CD ===
- Beauty Pop (xxxx) (Seiji Koshiba)

=== Tokusatsu ===
- Seijuu Sentai Gingaman (1998) (Houretsudo (ep. 21))
- Kamen Rider Den-O (2007) (Bluebird Imagin (31 - 32))
- Samurai Sentai Shinkenger (2009) (Ayakashi Sasamatage (ep. 20))
- Tensou Sentai Goseiger (2010) (Matroid Adoborute-G of the Vital (ep. 37))

=== Dubbing ===
==== Live-action ====
- Albino Alligator (Milo (Gary Sinise))
- Aliens in the Attic (Stu Pearson (Kevin Nealon))
- American Pie series (Noah Levenstein (Eugene Levy))
- Annabelle: Creation (Samuel Mullins (Anthony LaPaglia))
- Antarctic Journal (Sung-hoon (Yoon Je-moon))
- Apollo 13 (Fred Haise (Bill Paxton))
- At the End of the Tunnel (Guttman (Federico Luppi))
- Battleship (Air Force Chief of Staff (Gary Grubbs))
- Braveheart (Hamish (Brendan Gleeson))
- Bulworth (Dennis Murphy (Oliver Platt))
- Call Me by Your Name (Mr. Perlman (Michael Stuhlbarg))
- Captain Phillips (Mike Perry (David Warshofsky))
- The Cat in the Hat (The Cat in the Hat (Mike Myers))
- City Slickers II: The Legend of Curly's Gold (Glen Robbins (Jon Lovitz))
- Close Encounters of the Third Kind: The Final Cut (David Laughlin (Bob Balaban))
- Dangerous Beauty (Maffio Venier (Oliver Platt))
- Desperate Measures (Nate Oliver (Erik King))
- The Doors (John Densmore (Kevin Dillon))
- Drag Me to Hell (Mr. Jim Jacks (David Paymer))
- Fantastic Four (2008 NTV edition) (Ernie (David Parker))
- Frailty (Dad Meiks (Bill Paxton))
- Haven (Carl Ridley (Bill Paxton))
- Henry Poole Is Here (Father Salazar (George Lopez))
- High Noon (2021 Star Channel edition) (Mayor Jonas Henderson (Thomas Mitchell))
- Idlewild (Rooster (Big Boi))
- Independence Day: Resurgence (Dr. Isaacs (John Storey))
- The Man (Andy Fiddler (Eugene Levy))
- Memento (Burt (Mark Boone Junior))
- Mission: Impossible – The Final Reckoning (General Sidney (Nick Offerman))
- Noel (Dr. Baron (John Doman))
- Odd Thomas (Wyatt Porter (Willem Dafoe))
- Once Upon a Time in Mexico (Cucuy (Danny Trejo))
- Overdrive (Jacomo Morier (Simon Abkarian))
- Panic (Josh (John Ritter))
- Real (Dr. Choi Jin-ki (Lee Sung-min))
- Space Jam (Shawn Bradley)
- A Star Is Born (Lorenzo Campana (Andrew Dice Clay))
- Star Trek: The Next Generation (Geordi La Forge (LeVar Burton))
- Star Trek: First Contact (Geordi La Forge (LeVar Burton))
- Star Trek: Insurrection (Geordi La Forge (LeVar Burton))
- The Terminal (Joe Mulroy (Chi McBride))
- The Thomas Crown Affair (Detective Michael McCann (Denis Leary))
- Wind Chill (Pickup Driver (Ned Bellamy))

==== Animation ====
- Clifford the Big Red Dog (Clifford)
- Clifford's Really Big Movie (Clifford)
- Missing Link (Lord Piggot-Dunceby)
- Teenage Mutant Ninja Turtles (Rocksteady)
- Tiny Toon Adventures (Calamity Coyote)
