= The Animetal: Re-Birth Heroes =

Live album by Animetal
- Released: June 23, 2004
- Genre: Heavy metal; anison
- Length: 73:35
- Language: Japanese
- Label: VAP
- Producer: Yorimasa Hisatake

Animetal chronology
Animetal Marathon V (2003)	The Animetal: Re-Birth Heroes (2004)	Animetal Marathon VI: The Sentimetal (2004)

The Animetal: Re-Birth Heroes (ジ・アニメタル・リバース・ヒーローズ, Ji Animetaru Ribāsu Hīrōzu) is a live album by Japanese novelty heavy metal band Animetal, released through VAP on June 23, 2004. The album features "The Animetal", a re-recording of the band's self-titled 1996 debut single.

== Track listing ==
All tracks are arranged by Animetal.

No.	Title	Length
1.	"The Animetal: "Gatchaman no Uta" (ガッチャマンの歌, "Song of Gatchaman") (Science Ninja Team Gatchaman); "Combattler V Theme" (コン・バトラーVのテーマ, Conbatorā Bui no Tēma) (Chōdenji Robo Combattler V); "Yūsha Raideen" (勇者ライディーン, Yūsha Raidīn) (Reideen The Brave); "Tatakae! Casshan" (たたかえ！キャシャーン, Tatakae! Kyashān) (Casshan); "Mazinger Z" (マジンガーZ, Majingā Zetto) (Mazinger Z); "Getter Robo!" (ゲッターロボ！, Gettā Robo!) (Getter Robo); "Devilman no Uta" (デビルマンの歌, Debiruman no Uta, "Song of Devilman") (Devilman)"	6:34
2.	"Pegasus Fantasy" (Pegasasu Fantajī (ペガサス幻想))	4:13
3.	"Time for L-Gaim"	4:04
4.	"MC1"	1:40
5.	"Marathon V Medley (マラソンVメドレー, Marason Faibu Medorē): "Roller Hero Muteking" (ローラーヒーロー・ムテキング, Rōrā Hīrō Mutekingu) (Muteking, The Dashing Warrior); "Kinnikuman Go Fight!" (キン肉マン Go Fight！, Kin'nikuman Gō Faito!) (Kinnikuman); "Moete Hero" (燃えてヒーロー, Moete Hīrō, "Burning Hero") (Captain Tsubasa); "Red Baron" (レッドバロン, Reddo Baron) (Super Robot Red Baron); "Ryūsei Ningen Zone" (流星人間ゾーン, Ryūsei Ningen Zōn, "Meteor Human Zone") (Zone Fighter); "Zankoku na Tenshi no Tēze" (残酷な天使のテーゼ, "A Cruel Angel's Thesis") (Neon Genesis Evangelion)"	8:18
6.	"MC2"	0:41
7.	"Lupin Sansei no Theme" (Rupansansei no Tēma (ルパン三世のテーマ, "Theme of Lupin the Third"))	3:07
8.	"MC3"	3:22
9.	"Animetal Summer II (アニメタル・サマーII, Animetaru Samā Tsū): "Kizudarake no Eikō" (傷だらけの栄光, "Hard-Fought Honor") (Ashita no Joe 2); "Ōja! Samurai Giants" (王者！侍ジャイアンツ, Ōja! Samurai Jaiantsu, "Monarch! Samurai Giants") (Samurai Giants); "Karate Baka Ichidai" (空手バカ一代, "A Karate-Crazy Life") (Karate Master); "Minashiji no Ballad" (みなし児のバラード, Minashiji no Barādo, "Children's Ballad") (Tiger Mask); "Ashita no Joe" (あしたのジョー, Ashita no Jō, "Tomorrow's Joe") (Ashita no Joe)"	7:58
10.	"MC4"	0:39
11.	"Touch" (Tatchi (タッチ))	3:55
12.	"MC5"	0:22
13.	"Moonlight Densetsu" (Mūnraito Densetsu (ムーンライト伝説, "Moonlight Legend"))	2:23
14.	"MC6"	0:55
15.	"Yūki no Akashi" ((勇気の証, "Proof of Courage"))	3:01
16.	"MC7"	0:44
17.	"Uchū Senkan Yamato" ((宇宙戦鑑ヤマト, "Space Battleship Yamato"))	2:30
18.	"Mazinger Z" (Majingā Zetto (マジンガーZ))	7:54
19.	"Gatchaman no Uta" ((ガッチャマンの歌, "Song of Gatchaman"))	4:36
20.	"The Animetal" (Karaoke)	6:33
Total length:		73:35

== Personnel ==
- Eizo Sakamoto (さかもと えいぞう, Sakamoto Eizō) – Lead vocals
- Syu – Guitar
- Masaki – Bass
