= Ganbaron =

- Also known as: Chiisana Sūpāman Ganbaron; Little Superman Gunbaron
- Genre: Superhero; Kyodai Hero; Tokusatsu
- Country of origin: Japan
- Original language: Japanese
- No. of episodes: 32

Original release
- Network: Nippon Television
- Release: April 3 – December 24, 1977

Little Superman Ganbaron (小さなスーパーマン ガンバロン, Chiisana Sūpāman Ganbaron) is a 1977 Japanese tokusatsu live action television show featuring Japan's own version of American superhero Superman. It was the third in the Baron series, following Red Baron in 1973 and Mach Baron in 1974. This series was produced by the company; Soeisha for Nippon television.

== Background ==
Serialized television shows starring superheroes started appearing in Japan in 1957, following the success of Superman in the United States. Ganbaron, translated as "Fight Hard Man", was one such show.

== Synopsis ==
Teru Tendou is a young reporter for the Shonen Times. In times of trouble, he could transform into Ganbaron and save the day. The plot revolved mostly around Teru keeping his identity a secret from his friends.

The opening narration was "Look! Up in the sky! It's a bird! It's a plane! No, it's Ganbaron! Faster than a Shinkansen! Stronger than Kaiju!"

Similar to Tetsujin 28-go and Giant Robo, Ganbaron could call a giant robot named Daibaron ("big baron"). Unlike those two however, Daibaron was a combining robot similar to Getter Robo or Golion/Voltron.

The show was sponsored by Bullmark which advertised toys based on the show, such as the "Zincron Deluxe Daibaron".
