= List of Azumanga Daioh chapters =

Azumanga Daioh was written and illustrated by Kiyohiko Azuma, largely in yonkoma (four-panel) format. The unnumbered chapters were serialized by MediaWorks' in the monthly magazine Dengeki Daioh from February 1999 to May 2002 and collected in four tankōbon volumes. Each of the four volumes covers about a year in the characters' lives. A new edition in three volumes was released in Japan by Shogakukan to commemorate the manga's 10th anniversary, with volume one, covering the first year of high school, being published June 11, 2009. The reprint edition contains three additional 16-page chapters serialized in Monthly Shōnen Sunday starting in May 2009 under the title Azumanga Daioh: Supplementary Lessons (あずまんが大王·補習編, Azumanga Daiō Hoshūhen).

The series was licensed in English in North America and the United Kingdom by ADV Manga, which released all four volumes between 2003 and 2004. ADV later reprinted the series in an omnibus edition (ISBN 978-1-4139-0364-5) on November 7, 2007. In 2009, Yen Press acquired the North American and UK license of Azumanga Daioh, and released a new translation in December 2009 in an omnibus volume. In Europe, Azumanga Daioh is licensed in French by Kurokawa, in German by Tokyopop, in Spanish by Norma Editorial, and in Finnish by Punainen jättiläinen. In Asia, the series has been licensed in Korean by Daiwon C.I., in Thai by Negibose Comics, in Vietnam by TVM Comics, and in Chinese by Tong Li Publishing. It was the first yonkoma manga translated in France.

== Volume list ==
No.	Original release date	Original ISBN	English release date	English ISBN
1	February 10, 2000	978-404-869026-3	September 3, 2003	1-4139-0000-3
"April: Part 1"; "April: Part 2"; "May: Part 1"; "May: Part 2"; "June"; "Deluxe"; "July"; "August: Part 1"; "August: Part 2"; "September: Part 1"; "September: Part 2"; "October: Part 1"; "October: Part 2"; "November: Part 1"; "November: Part 2"; "December: Part 1"; "December: Part 2"
2	October 27, 2000	4-8402-1691-6	November 5, 2003	1-4139-0023-2
"January"; "January Special: First Dream of the New Year"; "February"; "March: Part 1"; "March: Part 2"; "April: Part 1"; "April: Part 2"; "May: Part 1"; "May: Part 2"; "June"; "June Special: Osaka's Half-Day"; "July"; "July Special: A Day in the Life of Chiyo-chan"; "August: Part 1"; "August: Part 2"; "August: Part 3"
3	September 10, 2001	4-8402-1943-5	February 1, 2004	1-4139-0030-5
"September: Part 1"; "September: Part 2"; "October: Part 1"; "October: Part 2"; "November: Part 1"; "November: Part 2"; "December: Part 1"; "December: Part 2"; "January Special: The First Dream of the New Year"; "January"; "February: Part 1"; "February: Part 2"; "March: Part 1"; "March: Part 2"; "April: Part 1"; "April: Part 2"; "May: Part 1"; "May: Part 2"
4	June 10, 2002	4-8402-2128-6	April 1, 2004	1-4139-0048-8
"June: Part 1"; "June: Part 2"; "July: Part 1"; "July: Part 2"; "August"; "September: Part 1"; "September: Part 2"; "October: Part 1"; "October: Part 2"; "November Special"; "December: Part 1"; "December: Part 2"; "January: Part 1"; "January: Part 2"; "February: Part 1"; "February: Part 2"; "Graduation: Part 1"; "Graduation: Part 2"
