= The Iron Superman =

- Theatrical poster
- Directed by: Kwok Ting-Hung
- Screenplay by: Ting Hung-Kuo
- Based on: Super Robot Mach Baron by Koichi Takano
- Produced by: Chang Cheh; Li Kuei-Wu
- Starring: Stephan Yip; Li Lin-Lin; Jamie Luk; Paul Chun; Godfrey Ho
- Cinematography: Ting Hung-Kuo
- Edited by: Ting Hung-Kuo
- Music by: Chiang Chin-Lin
- Production company: Chin Hua Motion Picture Company
- Distributed by: Chang's Film Company (Taiwan); Shaw Brothers (Hong Kong); Gofer Films (Spain); CFC Contact-Film Verleih (Germany)
- Release date: 19 July 1975 (Taiwan)
- Running time: 88 minutes
- Countries: Taiwan; Hong Kong
- Languages: Taiwanese; Japanese

The Iron Superman (titled in Spain as Mazinger Z, el robot de las estrellas) is a 1975 science fiction film of Taiwanese origin, directed by Kwok Ting-Hung and starring Jamie Luk, Maggie Lee, and Paul Chun.

In 1978, it was the subject of a Spanish comic book adaptation and expansion by the Spanish publisher Editorial Valenciana.

== Production ==
The film is unrelated to the characters created by Go Nagai. Instead, it is based on the Japanese live-action television series Super Robot Mach Baron (1974–75). The Taiwanese producers of The Iron Superman purchased the rights to the Japanese series to create a theatrical re-edit.

The re-edit reused combat footage of the robots and wide shots of the original actors, while inserting new scenes with Taiwanese performers costumed like their Japanese counterparts whenever they were clearly identifiable. Although the movie roughly follows the plot of several episodes of the series, some minor details—especially the characters’ names—were altered.

== Plot ==
Professor Lu, a scientist, mentors Yan Tien-Yu, whose parents were killed years earlier by a robot sent by the evil Dr. Hell, ruler of the Robot Empire. Lu reveals that he has completed Mazinger, a giant robot built to combat Dr. Hell's mechanical army, and appoints Tien-Yu as its pilot.

When Dr. Hell dispatches the "Flying-Wheel Robot" to destroy a city, Tien-Yu and the Steel Bodyguards—a team of young pilots recruited by Lu—launch to defend it. Piloting Mazinger for the first time, Tien-Yu rescues his comrades and destroys the robot that murdered his parents.

After a series of battles involving air, sea, and amphibious robots, Dr. Hell kidnaps Lu to obtain the formula of "tanium", the alloy that armors Mazinger. Lu fakes his death and later reveals the weak point of Dr. Hell's new "Death Ray Robot", allowing Tien-Yu to destroy it. In the final confrontation, Mazinger and the Steel Bodyguards assault Dr. Hell's fortress, annihilating his last weapon and killing him as his base explodes.

== Release ==
The film was screened in Europe, particularly in countries where the anime series Mazinger Z had been a hit. It was retitled Mazinger Z: The Robot of the Stars to attract children and teenage audiences. The credits listed fictitious Western-sounding names. In the dubbed soundtrack, the distributors inserted several original themes from the Mazinger Z anime, alternating with Taiwanese songs.

In Spain, it was released by Gofer Films in the summer of 1978, coinciding with the broadcast of the animated series and achieving great box-office success. Unlike the series—dubbed in Barcelona—the film was dubbed in Madrid’s Sincronía studios, with a cast including Antonio García Moral, Elena de Maeztu, Roberto Cuenca Martínez, Luis Porcar, Juan Antonio Gálvez, and Luis Carrillo as Dr. Hell.

== Adaptations and merchandising ==
The film's success generated merchandising in Spain. Its soundtrack became popular enough to be released that same year by the label Nevada record label. A sticker album and a photo-book based on the film were also published. The most notable spin-off, however, was the comic-book serialization of the same title by Editorial Valenciana.

== Bibliography ==
- Delhom, José María (1989). Catálogo del tebeo en España, 1865–1980. Barcelona: Círculo del Cómic S.A./CESA. ISBN 84-8449-221-4.
- Pons, Álvaro; Porcel Torrens, Pedro; Sorní, Vicente (2007). Viñetas a la luna de Valencia. Papers Grisos. Castalla: Edicions de Ponent. ISBN 978-84-96730-04-5. Legal deposit A-295-2007.
- Cara, Diego (2008). El tebeo español y sus autores / II. Almería: Colectivo D. Tebeos (Tebeolandia 3). ISBN 978-84-934715-8-3. Legal deposit AL-1162-2008.
