= Beauty Pop =

Japanese manga

- Cover of first manga volume featuring Kiri

ビューティー ポップ (Byūtī Poppu)
- Genre: Romantic comedy
- Manga
- Written by: Kiyoko Arai
- Published by: Shogakukan
- English publisher: NA: Viz Media
- Magazine: Ciao
- Original run: 2003 – 2008
- Volumes: 10
- Manga

Beauty Pop Returns
- Written by: Kiyoko Arai
- Published by: Shogakukan
- Magazine: Ciao Plus
- Original run: April 27, 2025 – present

Beauty Pop (Japanese: ビューティーポップ, Hepburn: Byūtī Poppu) is a Japanese shōjo manga written and illustrated by Kiyoko Arai. It originally ran in the manga magazine Ciao. Beauty Pop is published in English by VIZ Media under the Shojo Beat label. The manga focuses on the life of a naturally talented hairstylist named Kiri Koshiba and her problems with the Scissors Project, a group of boys determined to become the best makeover team in Japan. Beauty Pop went on short hiatus from Ciao, but returned under the title Beauty Pop Stage 2. The manga has also been adapted into a Drama CD, which was released on 25 November 2004.

== Plot ==
High school student Kiri Koshiba uses her hairstyling talents to help brighten up the lives of girls often deemed as "ugly", but she does so anonymously. Due to her skill, Kiri becomes a rival to the Scissors Project, an infamous club consisting of self-proclaimed genius hairstylist Shougo Narumi, cosmetic expert Kazuhiko Ochiai, and nail artist Kei Minami. The Scissors Project is known for their showy performances where they give public makeovers to members of the student body, specifically already "beautiful" girls, and as a result attract an often-times overwhelming amount of attention.

After the rejection of Kiri's friend Kanako Aoyama when she professes her love to Ochiai, Kiri gives her a makeover in order to help boost her self-esteem. Interpreting this as a challenge to the supremacy of the SP, Narumi issues a formal challenge to the offender, whom he refers to as "X" due to their anonymity to ensure that his club remains on top. After "X" defeats Narumi and is revealed to be Kiri Koshiba, Kiri eventually becomes a reluctant member of the SP, whether or not Narumi approves.

Throughout the series, the SP continues to grow and meet the challenges of becoming the top team of beauticians in Japan, unless their interpersonal issues get in the way.

== Characters ==
- Kiri Koshiba (小柴 綺里, Koshiba Kiri) is a cute and technically gifted hair stylist who uses her talents to improve the lives of those she encounters, typically after witnessing her clients getting ridiculed or abused for their appearance. Her goal becomes to spread "a little magic" by giving her clients a neat hairstyle.
- Shogo Narumi (鳴海 彰伍, Narumi Shōgo) is the vain, handsome, and temperamental main hair stylist of the Scissors Project. Although he is very competitive in comparison to the majority of the other characters, he is the most amenable member of his own family.
- Kazuhiko Ochiai (落合 計彦, Ochiai Kazuhiko) is the overall beauty consultant of the group. He is the brains behind the operation and acts like a human computer, with "data" on every girl in the school. Kazuhiko is also responsible for make-up on the team and is aided by the products from his parents' company.
- Kei Minami (南 啓, Minami Kei) is a member of the Scissors Project that does nail art. He is energetic and often seen eating junk food, such as candy. Kei likes to come up with nicknames for his friends, including "Naru-Naru" and "Narurin" for Narumi as well as "Occhi" for Ochiai. He also serves as emcee for any Scissors Project event, announcing the model and occasionally commenting while Narumi cuts.
- Kanako Aoyama (青山 加奈子, Aoyama Kanako) is Kiri's shy and bookworm friend who admires her talents. When she was rejected by Kazuhiko Ochiai, Kiri gave her a makeover to teach the Scissors Project a lesson. After SP's initial model in the final competition backs out, Kanko ends up filling in.
- Taro Komatsu (小松 太郎, Komatsu Tarō) is Kiri's childhood friend and neighbor. She calls him "Shimatarou" or "Taro-Tard", which annoys him very much. Taro is a big fan of the Scissor Project, and he wants to be a beautician as a result even though he lacks the skill.
- Shampoo (シャンプー, Shanpū) is Kiri's pet cat. She was first a stray who would not trust anyone because she had a bad past. When she met Kiri, Shampoo scratched her hand. However, Shmapoo realizes that Kiri was not like the other people that she had seen, who had been mean and heartbroken.
- Iori Minamoto (源 伊織, Minamoto Iori) is Kiri's childhood friend who returned Japan from New York. His father specializes in making aromatherapy oils and perfumes. He is apparently in love with Kiri's mom and affectionate of Kiri.
- Seiji Koshiba (小柴 政司, Koshiba Seiji) is Kiri's father who owns the Koshiba Beauty Salon and was the one to train Kiri in the art of hairstyling.
- Emi Koshiba (小柴 恵実, Koshiba Emi) is Kiri's mother who is a famous special effects make-up artist in Hollywood.
- Kenichiro Seki (関 謙一郎, Seki Ken'ichirō) is Kiri's childhood friend. He is regarded as part of the Seki Clinic, which specializes in invigorating massage due to his "Hands of God". His calm personality tends to make even the angriest people around him calm as well.
- Chisami Narumi (鳴海 千佐美, Narumi Chisami) is Narumi's younger sister who Kiri indifferently "saves" someday when her hair was tangled in a bush. As a result, Chisami seems to think that Kiri is her Prince Charming (as she thought Kiri was a boy).
- Billy Iketani (ビリー 池谷, Iketani Birī) is a famous hairstylist from Los Angeles who is always shown with headphones around his neck. His parents were close friends of Kiri's parents and famous stylists in there who died in an accident when he was a child. Billy works for Narumi's father.

== Media ==
=== Manga ===
Beauty Pop was serialized in Ciao magazine for a total of 51 chapters and bound into 10 volumes by publisher Shogakukan. Viz Media licensed the manga for an English release under its Shojo Beat line. The series underwent a short hiatus from Ciao, but returned October 2006 under the new title Beauty Pop Stage 2 and the volumes themselves stayed under the name Beauty Pop. The manga was also published in Vietnam by TVM Comics and France by Soleil Productions.

A sequel titled Beauty Pop Returns began serialization on Shogakukan's Ciao Plus website on April 27, 2025.

==== Volume listing ====
No.	Original release date	Original ISBN	North America release date	North America ISBN
1	February 26, 2004	4091383823	September 5, 2006	1-4215-0575-4
2	July 7, 2004	4091383831	December 5, 2006	1-4215-0576-2
3	November 30, 2004	4091383882	March 6, 2007	1-4215-1009-X
4	June 1, 2005	4091383904	June 5, 2007	1-4215-1010-3
5	December 26, 2005	4091302955	Sep. 4, 2007	1-4215-1011-1
6	June 1, 2006	4091304087	December 4, 2007	1-4215-1323-4
7	November 29, 2006	4091306667	March 4, 2008	1-4215-1784-1
8	April 27, 2007	9784091310965	June 3, 2008	1-4215-1927-5
9	October 1, 2007	9784091312587	October 7, 2008	1-4215-2310-8
10	February 29, 2008	9784091315007	April 7, 2009	1421525941

=== Drama CD ===
A drama CD adaptation of the manga was released on November 25, 2004. It stars Junko Minagawa as Kiri Koshiba, Tomokazu Seki as Shogo Narumi, Aoki Makoto as Kazuhiko Ochiai, Hiro Shimono as Kei Minami, Masayo Kurata as Kanako Aoyama, Hiroshi Shimozaki as Taro Komatsu, and Mitsuaki Hoshino as Seiji Koshiba.
