= Mariko Shiga =

Japanese idol singer (1969–1989)

- 志賀 真理子
- Shiga during recording for Magical Idol Pastel Yumi.
- Born: December 24, 1969; Funabashi, Chiba, Japan
- Died: November 23, 1989 (aged 19); Near Flagstaff, Arizona, United States
- Cause of death: Vehicle accident
- Occupations: Idol star and voice actress
- Years active: 1984–1989

Mariko Shiga (志賀 真理子, Shiga Mariko; December 24, 1969 – November 23, 1989) was a Japanese idol star and voice actress born in Funabashi, Chiba, Japan. She is mostly known for her lead role as the voice of Yumi Hanazono, the main character of the 1980s anime Pastel Yumi, the Magic Idol. Shiga attended and graduated from Funabashi Municipal High School, before enrolling overseas in the University of California, Riverside in 1989.

While on a trip to Arizona in November of that same year, Shiga was killed in a car accident near Flagstaff, when she was thrown from the vehicle due to the car rolling, as it swerved to avoid hitting a deer that jumped out in front of the car she was riding in. She died thirty-one days before her 20th birthday.

== Biography ==
=== Idol and voice actress career ===
Shiga had a starring role as one of the children answering questions in the NHK quiz show Donna Mondai Q TV from 1984 to 1985. She performed the song Yume no Naka no Rondo, which was used as the theme song for the July 1985 OVA Magical Princess Minky Momo: La Ronde in My Dream. In 1986, Shiga played the role of Yumi Hanazono, the main character in Magical Idol Pastel Yumi. Her single, Freesia no Shōnen, was used as a theme song for the same series, and this helped her gain in popularity. After playing the role of Yumi and performing the theme song for the series, she officially made her debut as an idol singer under Warner Pioneer.

The actual debut song as a singer is the song "Dream Rondo -Rondo-" released in 1985 by Victor Music Industry (now JVC Kenwood Victor Entertainment). This song was used as the theme song for the OVA Magical Princess Kanojo no Minkyomomo Yume no Naka no Rondo released in July 1985.

After that, in Magical Idol Pastel Yumi (1986), she voiced the main character Yumi Hanazono, and was in charge of the theme song "Freesia no Shounen". For this reason, "Yume no Naka no Rondo -Rondo-" is now considered a pre-debut song.

Shiga's only song to be listed on the Oricon Top 100 Weekly Rankings is Freesia, which ranked as high as #48 during the week of March 31, 1987.

During the promotion of her second single, she appeared as a guest on the radio program "Kenji and Yasuko's Omoshiro Land" (Nippon Cultural Broadcasting). She stated that she had a calm voice for a female idol at the time.

=== Retirement from the entertainment industry ===
In April 1988, when Shiga entered university, she faced the problem of balancing her studies and activities in the entertainment industry, and retired from the entertainment industry. In August 1989, she went to study abroad at the University of California, Riverside, in order to learn languages and jazz, which was her favorite music genre.

At the 10th anniversary event of the founding of Studio Pierrot held in July of the same year, she temporarily returned and acted as a moderator. This is due to the fact that the production studio of Pastel Yumi, which was the voice actor for the main character, was "Studio Pierrot", and the relationship was deep.

== Death ==
On November 23, 1989 (24th Japan time), while Shiga was on a short trip with four friends after studying abroad, a deer jumped out in front of the car they were riding in on a freeway near Flagstaff, Arizona; in order to avoid hitting the deer, the driver suddenly turned the steering wheel while driving at a high speed, causing a traffic accident in which the car overturned.

The four friends who were in the car were seriously injured, but survived. However, Shiga died instantly from bruises all over her body when she was thrown out of the car; she was 19 years old at the time of her death. Shiga was scheduled to return to Japan for the first time after her studies on December 3, one month before her 20th birthday.

Shiga's body was cremated locally and the remains were returned to Japan in 1990.

== Voice roles ==
- Pastel Yumi, the Magic Idol series (Yumi Hanazono)

== Music ==
=== Singles ===
Yume no Naka no Rondo
(EP) Victor Entertainment, KV-3068
Freesia no Shōnen / Kane no Ribon de Rock-shite
(EP) Warner Pioneer, L-1730
Aoi Namida / Hishochi no Yakusoku
(EP) Warner Pioneer, L-1736
Hikōki Kumo / Ame ni Nurete Ponytail
(EP) Warner Pioneer, L-1766
Rainy Day Hello / Time for Love
(EP) Warner Pioneer, L-1819

=== Albums ===
mariko (Warner Pioneer)
(LP) L-12579, Cassette LKF-8129, released 1986-06-25
(CD) 32XL-157, released 1986-07-25
(CD) WPC6-8202, released 1996-04-25
1. Natsu yori Tōku made Suki
2. Canvas
3. Twilight Brooch
4. Girl Friend
5. Wonder in My Heart
6. Shiokaze Station
7. Taiyō ni Naritai
8. Ame ni Nurete Ponytail
9. Hishochi no Yakusoku
10. Hikōki Kumo
mariko+3 (Warner Pioneer)
(CD) WPC6-8202, released 1996-04-25
1. Natsu yori Tōku made Suki
2. Canvas
3. Twilight Brooch
4. Girl Friend
5. Wonder in My Heart
6. Shiokaze Station
7. Taiyō ni Naritai
8. Ame ni Nurete Ponytail
9. Hishochi no Yakusoku
10. Hikōki Kumo
11. Freesia no Shōnen
12. Kane no Ribon de Rock-shite
13. Aoi Namida

=== Compilations ===
Haha to Ko no Dōyō no Kuni
(CD) 25L2-76
All songs by Fusako Amachi except 3-4, which are by Mariko Shiga.
1. Gomen Gomen no Uta
2. Sasuke to Tomodachi
3. Fumikiri de
4. Yūhi no Uta
5. Kumo no Mokumoku
6. Halley Suisei
7. Tabetemitai na
8. Akai Pīman
9. Kamisamatte Nannano
10. Boku no Tōsan
11. Yūyake ga Mieru kara
12. Supermarket Blues
Oshiete Idol Warner Music-hen Sono Ki ni Sasete
(CD) Warner Pioneer, PCD-1368/WQCL-78
1. Sentimental Mini Romance (Atsumi Kurasawa)
2. Bye-bye Boy ni Shite Ageru (Naomi Hosokawa)
3. Futari wa Magic (Asuka Suita)
4. Koi no Magnitude (Yoshimi Yokosuka)
5. Sono Ki ni Sasete (Rie Hatada)
6. My Boy (Kumiko Takeda)
7. Chotto Henshin (Yasuko Obara)
8. Honey Moon (A-cha)
9. Ōenshiteru kara ne (Miki Fujitani)
10. Cinderella Liberty mo Hecchara (Youki Kudoh)
11. Sukeban Deka III Theme Song Medley (Yui Asaka)
12. Honmoku Rainy Blues (Kyōko Katō)
13. Koibito-tachi no Nagai Yoru (Yuki Hoshino)
14. Rainy Day Hello (Mariko Shiga)
15. Jamaican Affair (Yuki Okazaki)
16. Yūgure Bon Voyage (Mikako Hashimoto)
17. Hana no yō ni (Miyuki Sugiura)
Emotion 20th Anniversary Theme Collection - OVA & Movie
(CD) Victor Entertainment, VICL-60938

Disc 1

1. Dallos no Theme (Horn Spectrum, from Dallos)
2. Yume no Naka no Rondo (Mariko Shiga, from Magical Princess Minky Momo: La Ronde in My Dream)
3. Active Heart (Noriko Sakai, from Gunbuster)
4. Try Again... (Noriko Sakai, from Gunbuster)
5. The Winner (Miki Matsubara, from Mobile Suit Gundam 0083: Stardust Memory)
6. Magic (Jacob Wheeler, from Mobile Suit Gundam 0083: Stardust Memory)
7. Just Fallin' Love: Ikustu mo no Setsunai Yoru no Naka de (Ayako Udagawa, from Dominion)
8. Kaze no Tsubasa (Hitomi Mieno, from Haou Taikei Ryuu Knight: Adeu's Legend)
9. Point 1 (Yumiko Takahashi, from Haou Taikei Ryuu Knight: Adeu's Legend)
10. Toketeiku Yume no Hate ni (Yayoi Gotō, from Iria: Zeiram the Animation)
11. 100mph no Yūki (Sakiko Tamagawa and Akiko Hiramatsu, from You're Under Arrest)
12. Arittake no Jōnetsu de (Sakiko Tamagawa and Akiko Hiramatsu, from You're Under Arrest)
13. After, in the Dark: Torch Song (Mai Yamane and Gabriela Robin, from Macross Plus)
14. Inori no Asa (Miwako Saitō, from Shamanic Princess)
15. Omoide no Mori (Miwako Saitō, from Shamanic Princess)
16. Future Shock (cherry, from Birdy the Mighty)

Disc 2

1. Ai, Oboete Imasu ka (long version) (Mari Iijima, from The Super Dimension Fortress Macross: Do You Remember Love?)
2. Tenshi no Enogu (Mari Iijima, from The Super Dimension Fortress Macross: Do You Remember Love?)
3. Akira no Theme (Geinoh Yamashirogumi, from Akira)
4. Voices (Akino Arai, from Macross Plus (movie edition))
5. Heart & Soul (Emilia with Basara Nekki, from Macross 7: The Galaxy Is Calling Me!)
6. In Yer Memory (Takkyū Ishino, from Memories)
7. Calling (Nitro, from You're Under Arrest: The Movie)
8. Tōi Kono Machi de (Naomi Kaitani, from Cardcaptor Sakura)
9. Ashita e no Melody (Chaka, from Cardcaptor Sakura)
10. Yubiwa (single version) (Maaya Sakamoto, from The Vision of Escaflowne)
11. Grace - Jinroh Main Theme - Omega (Hajime Mizoguchi, from Jin-Roh)
12. Ask DNA (The Seatbelts, from Cowboy Bebop: Heaven's Door)

=== Soundtracks ===
Magical Princess Minky Momo: Yume no Naka no Rondo Ongakuhen
(LP) Victor Entertainment, JBX-25066
(CD) Victor Entertainment, VDR-1073
Magical Princess Minky Momo: Fenarinarsa Song Festival
(CD) Victor Entertainment, VDR-1085
Dendō Twin Series Magical Princess Minky Momo TV-ban OVA-ban
(CD) Victor Entertainment, VICL-60419/20
Magical Idol Pastel Yumi Ongakuhen Vol.1
(LP) Warner Pioneer, K-10037
(CD) Warner Pioneer, 30XL-149
Magical Idol Pastel Yumi Ongakuhen Sōshūhen
(LP) Warner Pioneer, K-10038
(CD) Warner Pioneer, 30XL-164
Natsukashi no Music Clip 42 Magical Idol Pastel Yumi
(CD) Toshiba EMI, TOCT-10402

== Awards ==
In 2001, Shiga was posthumously awarded the "Natsukashi no Ongaku Daishō" at the 17th Annual OGUmen Awards for her song Rainy Day Hello.
