= Kiyoko Arai =

Japanese manga artist

Kiyoko Arai あらいきよこ
- Born: Haku Kiyoko Tokyo, Japan
- Area: Manga artist
- Notable works: Angel Lip; Ask Dr. Rin! Beauty Pop
- Awards: 44th Shogakukan Manga Award for shōjo manga for Angel Lip

Kiyoko Haku (朴 清子, Haku Kiyoko; born June 1 in Tokyo, Japan), known by the pen name Kiyoko Arai (あらい きよこ, Arai Kiyoko), is a Japanese manga artist. She made her manga debut in the January 1984 issue of Ciao with her story Chotto dake Biyaku. Since then, Arai has contributed many stories to Ciao, its sister magazine ChuChu, and fellow Shogakukan shojo magazine Cheese!.

== Works ==
This list may not be comprehensive.

- Alice ni Omakase! (Leave it to Alice)
- Angel Lip
- Natural Angel (sequel of Angel Lip)
- Ask Dr. Rin! (Dr. Lin ni Kiitemite!) (feng shui-themed manga)
- Beauty Pop
- Curry Club ni Ai ni Kite
- Genki de Fight!!
- Kamisama O•Ne•Ga•I
- Kokuhaku Hiyori
- Magical Idol Pastel Yumi
- Magical Star Magical Emi
- Yomogi Mochi Yake Ta?
- Runway wo Produce!!
- Mito No Otsubone
- Runway Wars!

== Awards ==
In 1999, Arai won the 44th Shogakukan Manga Award for shōjo manga for her manga Angel Lip.
