= Pastel Yumi, the Magic Idol =

1986 anime

- Magical Idol Pastel Yumi Freesia no Shōnen single cover
- 魔法のアイドルパステルユーミ
- Genre: Drama, magical girl
- Written by: Shōji Imai
- Directed by: Akira Shigino
- Music by: Kōji Makaino
- Opening theme: "Kin no Ribbon ni Rock Shite" by Mariko Shiga
- Ending theme: "Freesia no Shonen" by Mariko Shiga
- Country of origin: Japan
- Original language: Japanese
- No. of episodes: 25 (list of episodes)

Production
- Executive producer: Yuji Nunokawa
- Producers: Toru Horikoshi (NTV); Minoru Ohno (Yomiko); Yoshitaki Suzuki (Studio Pierrot)
- Production company: Studio Pierrot

Original release
- Network: NNS (NTV)
- Release: March 7 – August 29, 1986

Related
- Manga
- Written by: Kiyoko Arai
- Published by: Shogakukan
- Original run: 1986 – 1987
- Volumes: 2

Pastel Yumi, the Magic Idol (魔法のアイドルパステルユーミ, Mahō no Aidoru Pasuteru Yūmi) is a magical girl anime series by Studio Pierrot. It was simultaneously released as a manga by Kiyoko Arai. The fourth magical girl series created by Studio Pierrot, Pastel Yumi also appears in a feature-length OVA as well as the Majokko Club Yoningumi A-kūkan kara no Alien X OVA. Anime Sols attempted to crowd-fund the release of the show on North American DVD, but was not successful.

The series became available on the streaming service RetroCrush on May 1, 2020, but the series was taken down on September 1 as it was discovered that the subtitles for episodes 16–25 on the site came from the fansubber Johnny English Subs without his approval. It eventually returned to RetroCrush on March 26, 2021.

== Overview ==
While it has the word "idol" in its title, the story does not center around idols nor the entertainment world, unlike previous works by Studio Pierrot. Instead, it aims to be a classic magical girl anime where the protagonist uses magic to engage in various adventures. This marks a return to a more orthodox magical girl anime style. This shift in direction was in response to the previous work, Magical Emi, which had placed heavy emphasis on character development while the magical elements had taken a backseat.

Unlike the first three works which blended magic with everyday life, Pastel Yumi had a comical touch and focused on the joy of using magic. In terms of direction, despite the protagonist being an elementary school student, there was an excessive amount of "fan-service" aimed at older fans. Examples include the protagonist, Yumi, being reduced to her underwear by a magic effect and frequent bathing scenes. Some scenes were deemed problematic by TV stations, leading to cuts where nudity was obscured by steam effects. This marked a significant departure from typical girls' anime, drawing criticism including from female staff involved in the production.

With the waning popularity of magical girl anime at the time of broadcast, ratings were poor. The series ended after two cours instead of three. The Pierrot magical girl anime series entered a hiatus that lasted over ten years until the next installment, 'Fancy Lala' (1998), aired under a different production studio. Meanwhile, Studio Pierrot continued to explore magical girl projects, including a coloring book series for the 'Fashion Lala' project, which launched in 1986 and continued until 1998.

== Story ==
Yumi Hanazono loves flowers. She does not perform well in school, but loves to draw, and wants to be a manga artist. Her family runs a flower shop so she has grown up with a floral appreciation. Yumi is a very good artist, but does not always use the best judgement when she chooses her subjects. On the day of the Flower Festival, she entertains the other children by drawing portraits of the Lady Fukurokouji on the walls of her mansion. An angry Fukurokouji makes her clean the entire wall, but as she is doing so, she sees Fukurokouji about to destroy a dandelion. After saving it, she replants it in a tulip field. To her surprise, it starts speaking to her. The voices belong to Kakimaru and Keshimaru, two flower elves who have come to the Human World to grant Yumi special powers as a reward for her kindness.

The two elves give Yumi a magical wand and locket made from tulip blossoms. If Yumi draws something in mid-air with her wand, and recites the phrase, "Pastel Poppuru Poppin-pa!", whatever she drew will become real. The magic will only last for a short time, however.

Yumi uses her new powers to get to the Flower Festival celebrations by drawing a horse (which the elves turn into a pegasus). She uses them again when she accidentally ruins her father's contest entry, a life-size doll. She creates a duplicate dress and models it herself.

However, Yumi's new power has limits. She must be very inventive when solving problems, and whatever solution she thinks of must work within a time limit.

== Cast ==
- Yumi Hanazono: Mariko Shiga
- Kakimaru: Miina Tominaga
- Keshimaru: Yuriko Fuchizaki
- Kyōhei Misawa: Yū Mizushima
- Kenta Misawa: Chika Sakamoto
- Ichirō Hanazono: Yoshito Yasuhara
- Momoko Hanazono: Yūko Mita
- Mrs. Fukurokōji: Hiroko Maruyama
- Kunimitsu: Shigeru Chiba
- Dankichi Hanazono: Kei Tomiyama
- Musutaki: Sukekiyo Kameyama

== Staff ==
- Director: Akira Shigino
- Series coordinator: Shōji Imai
- Character design: Yumiko Horasawa, Kōji Motoyama -Horasawa left mid-production.
- Music: Kōji Makaino
- Production: Studio Pierrot

== Theme songs ==
Kin no Ribon de Rock-shite
Opening theme
Lyrics: Keiko Asō
Composition: Etsuko Yamakawa
Vocals: Mariko Shiga/Hideaki Tokunaga (Cantonese: Angela Fong)
Freesia no Shōnen
Ending theme
Lyrics: Keiko Asō
Composition: Etsuko Yamakawa
Vocals: Mariko Shiga

== Episode titles ==
1. Machi wa Mahō de Hanazakari
2. Mahō no Suteki na Tsukai Kata
3. Yoroshiku Bōken Girl
4. Ojii-chan Adventure
5. Kami Hikōki kara no Dengon
6. Futari no Fukurokōji-san
7. Namida no Diet Nikki
8. Mōichido Romance
9. Tobe Ai no Tsubasa de Sky High
10. Itazura Bake ni Goyōjin
11. Fushigi? Ōgontori Densetsu
12. Onee-sama wa Tsurai yo
13. Omakase Cupid
14. Omoide ni Kieta Kakimaru
15. Yōsei ga Kureta Ongakukai
16. Sumire Iro no Hatsukoi
17. Yumi-chan Ki o Tsukete
18. Hassha Bell ga Naru made
19. Hanabira no Step
20. Hana o Aishitemimasen ka?
21. Habatake Sora e Kaze o Ukete
22. Koi no Miscast
23. Iedeshita Otō-san
24. Sayonara Flower Town
25. Wasurenaide Memory

== OVAs ==
=== Majokko Club Yoningumi A-kūkan kara no Alien X ("The 4 Magic Girls' Club: Alien X from Dimension A") ===
Yumi, Persia, Mami, and Emi join forces to protect the Earth by fighting aliens on the surface of the Moon using their transformation abilities and magical powers. The OVA does nothing to advance the storylines in any of the individual stories, but is rather a side story for the four magical girl series released by Studio Pierrot. An official mook titled Majokko Club was published by Bandai under the B-Club Special imprint in October 1987. The mook features many pages of stills from the OVA as well as character, staff, and production information. The next OVA in the series was Harbor Light Story, the inspiration for the Fancy Lala series ten years later.
