= Red Baron (TV series) =

Japanese animated television series

レッドバロン (Reddo Baron)
- Genre: Mecha, Action
- Anime television series
- Directed by: Akio Sakai
- Produced by: Junki Takegami
- Written by: Kazuhiko Kobe
- Music by: Takashi Kudo
- Studio: Tokyo Movie Shinsha
- Original network: Nippon TV
- Original run: April 5, 1994 – March 28, 1995
- Episodes: 49

Red Baron (レッドバロン, Reddo Baron) is a Japanese animated television series directed by Akio Sakai and produced by Nippon TV along with Tokyo Movie Shinsha. The show is a remake of the 1973 live-action series Super Robot Red Baron.

Red Baron follows Ken Kurenai, the pilot of the titular robot, Red Baron.

== Plot ==
Sometime in the future, the "Metal Fight" games, in which robot contestants compete for the title of Best Metal Fighter in the World, is the most popular televised sport in the world,

Kurenai Ken, along with teammate Saeba Shôko (who was, at first, adamantly opposed), pilots the Super Robot Fighter, Red Baron, and enters the contest with dreams of becoming its champion. He must, however, face an army of other rivals from around the world including "Kaizer" and the Tetsumen Tô doctors, and later allies like Tiger and ShinRon.

== Characters ==
Ken Kurenai
Voiced by: Kappei Yamaguchi
The pilot of "Red Baron". He basically enters the Metal Fight to be its champion. He sometimes butts heads with Shôko and Robby. He has a secret crush on Shôko. When the 2 first met, Ken thought Shôko was a boy, to which she revealed her face to him and kicked him between the legs in episode one of the series. He tends to act silly most of the time, but when the situation calls for it, he can act in a serious and logical manner. In battle he is a great strategist, being able to see through his enemies techniques and reveal their weak spots. A highly skilled martial artist, he trained in Muay Thai alongside Shadow since childhood, developing an early rivalry with him. Finally, one of his most common traits when fighting is that he is never willing to give up, even when having sustained grievous injuries (such as when Kômei tore off one of Red Baron's arms, or when Shadow ripped of some sort of cooling device out of Red Baron's chest); however, it is due to this fighting spirit that he is also able to win his most difficult fights (being able to use his spiritual energy to give the Red Baron a great power boost). His true name may not be Ken Kurenai, due to the fact that when meeting Kumano in the first episode, he looks at a bunch of roses before saying his name (Kurenai being the Japanese descriptive word for "crimson", and Ken taking some time before coming up with the name). (His name is translated as "Kent de la Rosa" in the Spanish version, and "Kent Flores" in the Portuguese version.)
Shôko Saeba
Voiced by: Rie Iwatsubo
The creator, engineer, and designer of "Red Baron". At first she was adamant in not entering it on the Metal Fight (saying that the Metal Fight was "the most awful thing" [not exact words] and hating it), but she entered it after seeing Ken fight in it. She also has, as we see in episode 40, a secret crush on Ken, something that Chatatsu Lee refuses to believe until episodes 41 and 42, when he finally concedes defeat in love. Even at her young age, she is shown to be a very gifted engineer, as she designed and created the Red Baron almost on her own, and as the series progresses, she also designs and develops all of the Red Baron upgrades in a little amount of time. (Her first name is changed to "Sally" in both Spanish and Portuguese versions.)
Robby
Voiced by: Rin Mizuhara episodes 5-17, 23-49; Yoshiko Kamei episodes 1-4; Teiyū Ichiryūsai episodes 18-22)
Shôko's robot friend. He's basically the smart-ass of the show. His name is a reference to "Robby the Robot", although this is a large departure from the original Robby's description.
Isao Kumano
Voiced by: Naoki Tatsuta
A critic who met Ken and has been with him, Shôko, and Robby since the series' start. Sometimes butts heads with Doctor Freud. He also has a daughter, whom Ken saved in episode 8. He seems to have a great knowledge of martial arts, as he is able to recognize a particular technique after seeing or hearing about it.
Kômei Ryû
Voiced by: Kaneto Shiozawa
A cook Ken and Shôko met. He's the pilot of Shinron. He basically is the wisest member of the "Red Baron team". He has a crush with Doctoress Marilyn. He is a highly skilled Kung Fu master, often giving advice to Ken during fights and helping him train to become even stronger. His name is the Japanese pronunciation of the courtesy name of Zhuge Liang, Kong Ming, a strategist during the Three Kingdoms period in China.
Kaizer/Tetsurō Saeba
Voiced by: Ikuya Sawaki
Shôko's father. He was supposedly kidnapped by the Tetsumen Tô; however, this is just a ruse, as he was just possessed by the Sigma Computer. He also was the overseer of the Battle Royale, although no-one suspected it. As Kaizer, he basically ordered his army to capture both Shôko and "Red Baron". He basically employed his 3 henchmen to try to take it, but as these failed, he was forced to fire them, replacing them with Shadow. His identity was revealed in Episode 33, to which Shôko reacted in a shocked way. He confessed to Shôko the extent of his crimes since he was possessed by the Sigma Computer. Shôko pleaded him to come back, but refused, as he had one task to do: destroy the Sigma Computer. He supposedly died while the Sigma Computer was being destroyed, but, in reality, he survived, along with the Sigma computer, which then gained 2 separate identities: one male, one female. He helped train Ken and the others in the final episodes of the Sigma Computer story arc.
Doctoress Marilyn
Voiced by: Yuko Kobayashi
The only female in the Tetsumen Tô. She often butts heads with Asimov, Freud, Shôko (though not as frequently as with the other two), and Robby (one time). She uses her charms to get things the way she wants. She pilots the Venus robot. She has a crush on Kômei. Near the end of the series, she, along with Asimov Katoki, Orjin, Norman, and Hashnikov, were used as energy supplies by the Sigma computer and Sigma-Ken until they decided to stop using them and threw them away; it was only by the efforts of Kumano and Freud that they could be reached and helped in time. She faced Ken in Episode 27 with the Venus robot. Her name is a reference to Marilyn Monroe.
Doctor Asimov
Voiced by: Ginzo Matsuo
One of two male doctors in the Tetsumen Tô. He has a son, whom Ken faced in Episode 28. He and his son both pilot the Black Jaguar robot, and it seems that back in his days, he was also an excellent pilot. Near the end of the series, he, along with Marilyn, Orjin, Norman, and Hashnikov, were used as energy supplies by the Sigma computer and Sigma-Ken until they decided to stop using them and threw them away; it was only by the efforts of Kumano and Freud that they could be reached and helped in time. His name is a reference to Isaac Asimov, known for his science fiction work involving robots.
Doctor Freud
Voiced by: Chafurin
The other male doctor in the Tetsumen Tô. He butts heads with Kumano in the Sigma Computer story arc. His name is an obvious reference to Sigmund Freud.
Shadow
Voiced by: Daiki Nakamura
Ken's childhood rival. He pilots Gold Baron. He makes his first appearance in episode 30. He's obsessed with seeing "Red Baron"'s true power. Having trained with Ken for several years, he knows all of his fighting techniques.
Chatatsu Lee
Voiced by: Wataru Takagi
Kômei's rival, later to be his friend again. He had a spat with Kômei because of a girl they once knew. He pilots the Kung-Fu Tiger. He also has a crush on Shôko. His name is the Japanese pronunciation of the courtesy name of Sima Yi, Zhong Da, a strategist during the Three Kingdoms period in China.
Hashmikov
Voiced by: Masashi Sugawara
A Russian fighter who befriends Shôko and Ken. He pilots the "Bear" robot.
Orjin (or Odin) and Norman
Voiced by: Hirohiko Kakegawa (Odin/Orjin; episodes 13-18, 37-38, 49); Masaki Aizawa (Norman)
They are the self-proclaimed "Viking Brothers". Odin and Norman pilot the "King Sword" and "King Ox".
Sigma Computer
Voiced by: Run Sasaki (female); Masaharu Satō (male)
The computer that possessed Tetsuo Saeba. It came back with a vengeance after it was destroyed and kidnapped Shôko while she slept. The two sides to the computer proceeded to take off all her clothes and put her in a tank. They used her as bait to lure Ken so they could kill him and take Ken's brain and Red Baron. They were ultimately destroyed in the final episode.
Fake Ken
Voiced by: Kappei Yamaguchi
Ken's android doppelgänger, created by Sigma (despite not noting a difference between the two, Fake Ken can be set apart by his overall design: he looks emaciated and purplish in appearance). He pilots Death Baron.

== Metal Fighters ==
The mechas used in this series are called Metal Fighters. They are around 20 meters tall and are created for the sole purpose of fighting, so each one of them are designed in order to adapt to its pilot fighting style.

Red Baron
The titular mecha of the series. It shows no visible weapons, as it was not built with the intention of being a Metal Fighter in the first place. Instead of that, it relies on a device able to focus a great amount of heat to Red Baron's fists, forearms and legs, giving it the power to pierce through his opponents with ease. It has two finishers attacks: The Electrigger (The Red Baron rises its arms in the air, then places them at the side of its waist as it adopts a Horseman Stance and starts building up power as it prepares to start the attack. Then the technique itself can take many forms: either a single but powerful punch, a barrage of punches, an uppercut when fighting airborne enemies or a forearm strike when equipped with the Forearm Blades, but no matter the variation, it always ends with the Red Baron ramming his arm through his foe and causing them to explode) and the Rolling Thunder (The Red Baron jumps high in the air and starts rolling forward very fast while descending while directing most of his power to either one of its legs, finishing the attack with an axe kick to the enemy's head, causing them to explode). The Red Baron is resistant, if not invulnerable, to fire and high temperatures, rising unscratched when entering in contact with lava. One of the most mysterious facts about the Red Baron is the possibility of it actually being sentient, for example in the first episode it reacts to Ken's presence and only allowing him to pilot it, as well as denying him of the right to pilot it when Ken was acting cocky after winning an important tournament. It also seems to enter some sort of Berserk mode when Ken's own life is at risk or when he has been knocked out while piloting Red Baron. During this mode the Red Baron seems to get a huge power boost and (apparently) even the power to regenerate its damaged part, seen in the fight with the Gold Baron where the Red Baron appears to regenerate a device that was ripped from its chest.

== Episode list ==
| No. | Title | Original release date |
|---|---|---|
| 1 | "The apparition of a more powerful robot!!" Transliteration: "Saikyô Robo genwaru!!" (Japanese: 最強ロボ現わる!!) | April 5, 1994 |
| 2 | "Defeat! Champion"; Transliteration: "Taose! Champion" (Japanese: 倒せ! チャンピオン) | April 12, 1994 |
| 3 | "Decisive! The Deadly Punch"; Transliteration: "Kimeru! Hissatsu Punch" (Japanese: 決めろ! 必殺パンチ) | April 19, 1994 |
| 4 | "Showdown! Magma Hell"; Transliteration: "Kessen! Magma Jikoku" (Japanese: 決戦! マグマ地獄) | April 26, 1994 |
| 5 | "Defeated! The Air Assault Strategy"; Transliteration: "Yabure! Kuchu Setsuho" (Japanese: やぶれ! 空中殺法) | May 10, 1994 |
| 6 | "Beware! The Mermaid's Temptation"; Transliteration: "Kyofu! Ningyo Hime No Yuwaku" (Japanese: 恐怖! 人魚姫の誘惑) | May 17, 1994 |
| 7 | "Rival! Showdown with Shinron"; Transliteration: "Shukuteki! Shinron To No Taiketsu" (Japanese: 宿敵(ライバル)! 神龍との対決) | May 24, 1994 |
| 8 | "Escape! The ice trap" Transliteration: "Dasshutsu! Hyôga no wana" (Japanese: 脱出! 氷河の罠) | May 31, 1994 |
| 9 | "Burning! Devil in the desert" Transliteration: "Shakunetsu! Sabaku no akuma" (Japanese: 灼熱! 砂漠の悪魔) | June 7, 1994 |
| 10 | "Beckon! The New Special Attack"; Transliteration: "Unare! Shin Hissatsu Waza" (Japanese: うなれ! 新必殺技) | June 14, 1994 |
| 11 | "Strength! Ursa Major of Siberia"; Transliteration: "Kairiki! Siberia no Kyo Kuma" (Japanese: 怪力! シベリアの巨熊(ビッグベア)) | June 21, 1994 |
| 12 | "Surprise! Mysterious magic" Transliteration: "Genwaku! Nazo no dai majutsu" (Japanese: 幻惑! 謎の大魔術) | June 28, 1994 |
| 13 | "Jungle! Invisible Enemy"; Transliteration: "Mitsurin! mienai teki" (Japanese: 密林! 見えない敵) | July 5, 1994 |
| 14 | "Decision! The World's Strongest Robot"; Transliteration: "Kimeru! Sekai Saikyô Robo" (Japanese: 決めろ! 世界最強ロボ) | July 12, 1994 |
| 15 | "Love! ShinRon vs. Tiger"; Transliteration: "Koi Ga Kita! Shinron vs. Tiger" (Japanese: 恋がたき! 神龍VSタイガー) | July 19, 1994 |
| 16 | "Arrival! The Fake Baron"; Transliteration: "Shutsugen! Nisse Baron" (Japanese: 出現! にせバロン) | July 26, 1994 |
| 17 | "Clash! Baron vs. Tiger"; Transliteration: "Gekitotsu! Baron VS Tiger" (Japanese: 激突! バロンVSタイガー) | August 2, 1994 |
| 18 | "Showdown! Baron vs. the Viking Brothers"; Transliteration: "Taiketsu! Baron VS Viking Kyôdai" (Japanese: 対決! バロンVSバイキング兄弟) | August 9, 1994 |
| 19 | "Dragon Island! The Final Showdown"; Transliteration: "Dragon Shima! Saigo No Kessen" (Japanese: ドラゴン島! 最後の決戦!!) | August 16, 1994 |
| 20 | "Why!? Ken vs. Baron"; Transliteration: "Naze da!? Ken VS Baron" (Japanese: なぜだ!? 拳VSバロン) | August 23, 1994 |
| 21 | "Demon sword! Samuraider"; Transliteration: "Maken! Samuraider" (Japanese: 魔剣! サムライダー) | August 30, 1994 |
| 22 | "Horror! The Concert of Death"; Transliteration: "Senritsu! Shi no Concert" (Japanese: 戦慄! 死のコンサート) | September 6, 1994 |
| 23 | "Legend! The Goddess of the Moon and Sun"; Transliteration: "Densetsu! Tsuki To Taiyō No Megami" (Japanese: 伝説! 月と太陽の女神) | September 13, 1994 |
| 24 | "Defend! The Dreams of the Children"; Transliteration: "Mamore! Kodomo Tachi No Yume" (Japanese: 守れ! 子供たちの夢) | September 20, 1994 |
| 25 | "Take Down! The Hollywood Assassin"; Transliteration: "Taosu! Hollywood No Shikaku" (Japanese: 倒せ! ハリウッドの刺客) | September 27, 1994 |
| 26 | "Elimination! Battle Royale"; Transliteration: "Shitô! Battle Royale" (Japanese: 死闘! バトルロイヤル) | October 4, 1994 |
| 27 | "Marilyn! The Final Battle"; Transliteration: "Marilyn! Saigo No Chousen" (Japanese: マリリン! 最後の挑戦) | October 11, 1994 |
| 28 | "Secret! Asimov's Trump Card"; Transliteration: "Himitsu! Asimov No Kiributa" (Japanese: 秘密! アシモフの切札) | October 18, 1994 |
| 29 | "Freud! Baron's Destruction Orders"; Transliteration: "Freud! Baron Massatsu Shirei" (Japanese: フロイト! バロン抹殺指令) | October 25, 1994 |
| 30 | "Arrival! Gold Baron"; Transliteration: "Shutsugen! Gold Baron" (Japanese: 出現! ゴールドバロン) | November 1, 1994 |
| 31 | "War! The Ultimate Rival"; Transliteration: "Gekitô! Saikyô No Rival" (Japanese: 激闘! 最強のライバル) | November 8, 1994 |
| 32 | "Destroyed! Baron's Death"; Transliteration: "Hakai! Baron No Shi" (Japanese: 破壊! バロンの死) | November 15, 1994 |
| 33 | "Surprise! Kaizer's Identity"; Transliteration: "Igai! Kaizer No Shotai" (Japanese: 意外! カイザーの正体) | November 22, 1994 |
| 34 | "Menace! The Greatest Champion Strategy"; Transliteration: "Kyoe! Jijousaidai No Sakusen" (Japanese: 脅威! 史上最大の作戦) | November 29, 1994 |
| 35 | "Destiny! Kaizer vs. Baron"; Transliteration: "Shukumei! Kaizer vs. Baron" (Japanese: 宿命! カイザーVSバロン) | December 6, 1994 |
| 36 | "Attack! The New Enemy"; Transliteration: "Shurai! Aratana Teki" (Japanese: 襲来! 新たなる敵) | December 13, 1994 |
| 37 | "Assault! Sigma Tower"; Transliteration: "Toutsugeki! Sigma Tower" (Japanese: 突撃! シグマタワー) | December 20, 1994 |
| 38 | "Sacrifice! The Viking Brothers"; Transliteration: "Gisei! Viking Kyôdai" (Japanese: 犠牲! バイキング兄弟) | January 10, 1995 |
| 39 | "Offensive! Baron's Imitator"; Transliteration: "Shuaku! Baron Modoki" (Japanese: 醜悪! バロンもどき) | January 24, 1995 |
| 40 | "Dazzling! The Ultimate Chosetsuryu"; Transliteration: "Senkou! Kiyukoku Chosetsuryu" (Japanese: 閃光! 究極超絶龍) | January 31, 1995 |
| 41 | "Shocking! Mother Baron"; Transliteration: "Kyogaku! Mother Baron" (Japanese: 驚愕! マザーバロン) | February 7, 1995 |
| 42 | "Escape! Sigma Tower"; Transliteration: "Dashitsu! Sigma Tower" (Japanese: 脱出! シグマタワー) | February 14, 1995 |
| 43 | "Shock! Goddess of the Wind and the God of Thunder"; Transliteration: "Dengeki! Fûjin, Raijin" (Japanese: 雷撃! フージン、ライジン) | February 21, 1995 |
| 44 | "What?! The Other Ken"; Transliteration: "Nani! Mô Hittori No Ken" (Japanese: なに! もう一人の拳) | February 28, 1995 |
| 45 | "Return! Psychokinetic Power"; Transliteration: "Yomigaere! Psycho Power" (Japanese: 蘇れ! サイコパワー) | March 7, 1995 |
| 46 | "Eruption! Duel at the base of Mt. Fuji"; Transliteration: "Dai Funkan! Fujisan Fumoto No Kettô" (Japanese: 大噴火! 富士山麓の決闘) | March 14, 1995 |
| 47 | "Impulse! To Defeat Death Baron"; Transliteration: "Kogun! Death Baron wo Taosû" (Japanese: 孤軍! デスバロンを倒せ) | March 21, 1995 |
| 48 | "Resurrection! The Power of Friendship"; Transliteration: "Fukkatsu! Yûjô no chikara (Power)" (Japanese: 復活! 友情の力(パワー)) | March 28, 1995 |
| 49 | "Heated! Let it burn!!" Transliteration: "Atsuku! Moeru ze!!" (Japanese: 熱く! 燃えるぜ!!) | March 28, 1995 |
