= Angel Lip =

Japanese manga series

エンジェルリップ (Enjeru Rippu)
- Genre: Comedy, romance
- Manga
- Written by: Kiyoko Arai
- Published by: Shogakukan
- Magazine: Ciao
- Original run: 10 September 1996 – 10 October 1999
- Volumes: 9

Angel Lip (Japanese: エンジェルリップ, Hepburn: Enjeru Rippu) is a Japanese comedy romance shōjo manga series written and illustrated by Kiyoko Arai and serialized by Shogakukan on Ciao magazine. It has nine volumes, the first published on 10 September 1996 and the last on 10 October 1999.

== Characters ==
- Mikina

== Reception ==
It won the 44th Shogakukan Manga Award for shōjo manga.
