= TVM Comics =

Vietnamese publisher

TVM Comics is a publisher in Vietnam, headquartered in Ho Chi Minh City. The company was founded in 2007 as the entertainment-related publishing division of Vietnamese media corporation TVM Corp. TVM Comics is the first and only private company in Vietnam to publish manga for the Vietnamese audience, with rights secured from publishers from Japan such as Kodansha, Shogakukan, Shueisha, Akita Shoten, MediaWorks and Hakusensha.

== Manga titles published by TVM Comics ==
=== Shonen 17+ ===
- Umizaru (Sea Monkey - Khỉ Biển)
- Slam Dunk (manga)
- Rurouni Kenshin (Lãng khách Kenshin)
- D-Live!!
- Attack on Titan
- Black Butler

=== Shojo 17+ ===
- Tuxedo Gin (Cánh cụt Ginji)
- Sunadokei (Đồng hồ cát)
- Rabu Kon (Đôi Đũa Lệch)
- Vampire Princess Miyu (Công chúa Ma cà rồng Miyu)
- Gokinjo Monogatari (Anh chàng hàng xóm)
- Backstage Prince (Sau bức màn nhung)
- Hana Yori Dango (Con trai hơn hoa)
- Platinum Garden (Vườn địa đàng)

=== Shonen 13+ ===
- Dragon Voice
- The Law of Ueki (Luật của Ueki)
- Naruto (Naruto)
- Prince of Tennis (Hoàng tử Tennis)
- Bleach (manga)

=== Shojo 13+ ===
- UFO Baby (Daa!Daa!Daa)
- Beauty Pop (Dự Án Kéo Vàng)
- Full Moon o Sagashite (Tìm ánh trăng tròn)
- Twin Princesses of the Wonder Planet (Công chúa song sinh của hành tinh diệu kì)
- Otomen (Chàng trai hoàn hảo)
- Swan (Hồ Thiên Nga)
- Zig Zag (manga)
- Kirarin Revolution (Tôi là Idol)
- Milk Crown (Cô nàng quản gia)

=== All ages ===
- +Anima (+Anima)
- Yotsuba&! (Cỏ 4 lá)
- Azumanga Daioh (Nữ Sinh Trung Học)
