= Ask Dr. Rin! =

Japanese manga series

- Volume 4 cover

Dr.リンにきいてみて! (Dr. Rin ni Kiite Mite!)
- Manga
- Written by: Kiyoko Arai
- Published by: Shogakukan
- Magazine: Ciao
- Original run: August 1999 – June 2003
- Volumes: 8
- Anime television series
- Directed by: Shin Misawa
- Written by: Atsushi Maekawa
- Music by: Takanori Arisawa
- Studio: NAS; Studio Comet
- Original network: TXN (TV Tokyo)
- Original run: March 5, 2001 – February 25, 2002
- Episodes: 51

Ask Dr. Rin! (Dr.リンにきいてみて!, Dr. Rin ni Kiite Mite!) is an eight-volume manga series by Kiyoko Arai. It tells 13-year-old girl named Meirin Kanzaki who is endowed with Feng shui powers which allow her to read people's fortunes and give advice on how to receive good luck. She does this on a website under the pseudonym of "Dr. Rin". Rin is in love with her friend Asuka Yuki, who is a star of the school soccer team, but she constantly bothers him with her feng shui advice when he doesn't believe in any of that. Ask Dr. Rin! was serialized in Ciao. A 51-episode anime series was produced by NAS and TV Tokyo, animated by Studio Comet, directed by Shin Misawa and had music composed by Takanori Arisawa. It was broadcast by TV Tokyo from March 5, 2001, to February 25, 2002.

== Plot ==
Almost as soon as she mastered talking as a young child, Meirin Kanzaki discovered her feng shui powers and developed them to such a degree that she has developed an online help desk where she guides and counsels people under the pseudonym of "Dr. Rin" with such skill that she inadvertently throws away significant commerce from her father, Shō. Meirin has a crush on her childhood friend, Asuka Yuki, who has a difficult time placing occult phenomena such as feng shui in perspective. Meirin faces mysterious events and paranormal phenomenon of such complexity and treachery that she will need all the help and luck she can muster to save the day with her feng-shui divination and the hakke crystal bestowed unto her.

== Characters ==
=== Kanzaki family ===
Meirin Kanzaki (神崎 明鈴, Kanzaki Meirin)
Voiced by: Saeko Chiba
As the main character, Meirin Kanzaki is a tweenage girl with the power of feng shui divination whose potency and accuracy have been argued to exceed that of her father Shou who has his own feng shui divination service, but for Meirin and the other members of Kanzaki-ke, Meirin's online feng shui divination help desk has caused many an awkward and disconcerting moment at home because the mere mention of Dr. Rin makes Shō due to the fact that its heavy commerce is much of Shou's clientele base; as such, Meirin has to watch what she says around Shō so that her secondary identity stays a secret.
Shō Kanzaki (神崎 炒, Kanzaki Shō)
Voiced by: Kōji Ishii
Shō Kanzaki is Meirin's father who also boasts the capability of feng-shui divination; in contrast to his daughter, Shou avails his powers as more of a means of entertainment and flirtation with his female fans than as a sincere avenue of guidance although he is not hostile to doing private house calls. As has been demonstrated throughout the series, the mere mention of Dr. Rin is enough to send Shō into a not-at-all-comical conniption driven by his unwillingness to acknowledge that he is somewhat of a quack that almost forced unto his family the necessity of a clandestine nocturnal relocation to save face when he bungles an important commission at one point in the series. Shou's playboy proclivities figure heavily into his prologue of how he met his wife Emika.
Emika Kanzaki (神崎 笑華, Kanzaki Emika)
Voiced by: Chisa Yokoyama
Emika Kanzaki is Meirin's mother who spends most of her time at home as a housewife who does a lot of the typical activities associated with women such as cleaning the house and going shopping. Although it is rare, the incidents of divergent concourse that she gets into with her husband Shou seem to stem from the buyer's remorse of having foregone her prologue as a wrestler, a prologue that she demonstrates as a vehicle of her intense displeasure with Shou when he makes an ill-considered comment about her cooking in one episode. Emika does not seem to realize the true nature of the danger instigated by the potency of her daughter's powers.
Kōmi Kanzaki (神崎 餃子, Kanzaki Kōmi)
Voiced by: Eiji Moriyama
Kōmi is Meirin's older brother. He helps her keep her Dr. Rin homepage up and covers for her around their parents. He has a grudge against his father for naming him "Kōmi" using the kanji for "dumplings (Gyōza)".

=== Accompanying animals ===
Tenshin (天津)
Voiced by: Junko Takeuchi
Tenshin is Meirin Kanzaki's pet monkey who likes candy. They have caused a fair share of trouble for Meirin mostly in childish ways, such as eating her lunch and snacks. In one episode, Tokiwa uses one of his Shikigami to possess Tenshin to lure Asuka into one of his traps.
Nanao (七尾)
Voiced by: Masami Suzuki
A small, seven-tailed kitsune-shaped skikigami that belongs to Takashi Tokiwa. Nanao's name, in fact, means, "seven-tailed". He has helped Takashi develop his onmyō abilities since he was very young. As a result, he has a slightly contentious relationship with his owner. He also apparently has a fondness for eggs.
Cynthia (シンシア, Shinshia)
Voiced by: Yuki Kaida
A small stuffed panda with a soul, who is often seen with Banri Shijo. At the start of the series, because of her strong desire to become a human girl, she is manipulated by the Evil Being and takes over Banri's body. After the Evil Being is released from her, she and Banri become friends once again. She is interested in Asuka.
Takoyaki (タコヤキ)
Voiced by: Tetsuya Yanagihara
A parrot who shows up frequently with Eddy Tsukioka who likes money.

=== Four gods ===
Asuka Yūki (結城 飛鳥, Yūki Asuka)
Voiced by: Takayuki Sorita
Asuka is Meirin's childhood friend whom she has a crush on. He is frustrated by Meirin incessantly offering her supernatural feng-shui counsel, oblivious to his frequently and emphatically stated aversion thereof.
Takashi Tokiwa (常盤 崇, Tokiwa Takashi)
Voiced by: Yūto Kazama
Takashi is a bright and athletic student who insists he only loves Meirin, but does not complain about the attention he garners from flirting with all the other girls.
Banri Shijo (四条 万里, Shijo Banri)
Voiced by: Yumi Kakazu
Banri is a boy who uses tarot cards and has black belt in karate.
Eddy Tsukioka (月丘 エディ, Tsukioka Edi)
Voiced by: Hidenobu Kiuchi
Eddy is a foreigner who moved to Japan who speaks in Kansai dialect. He serves as interim coach of the soccer club after their original coach is hospitalized. Eddy is allergic to beautiful woman due to his painful childhood experiences.

=== Ancillary allies ===
Yue Konishi (小西 侑英, Konishi Yue)
Voiced by: Junko Takeuchi
Yue is Meirin's classmate and one of her two best friends. She is a member of the school track-and-field team. Yue makes jokes often about being in love with Meirin, but wants Meirin's dreams of receiving Asuka's love to come true, as proved from how upset she becomes when Meirin starts dating Tokiwa. She is normally seen as a savvy and cool-headed girl
Shuuko Kasukabe (春日部 周子, Kasukabe Shūko)
Voiced by: Kana Kouguchi
Shūko is Meirin's hyper-active friend who is noted for having a quick crush on boys quickly.
Daisuke Shinagawa (品川 大輔, Shinagawa Daisuke)
Voiced by: Kei Watanabe
Daisuke is one of Meirin's classmates. He plays on the school soccer team with Asuka and Takashi.
Keima Oimachi (大井町 敬馬, Ōimachi Keima)
Voiced by: Masaki Kitahara
A friend of Shinagawa, Keima is a skilled goalkeeper with a "talent" for twisting his body into weird shapes.

== Anime ==
The 51-episode anime, which was directed by Shin Misawa and produced by TV Tokyo and NAS, was broadcast on TV Tokyo from March 5, 2001, to February 25, 2002.

#	Title	Original release date
1	"The Rumored Feng Shui Master!" "Uwasa no Tensai Fūsuisha!" (Japanese: ウワサの天才風水師!)	5 March 2001
2	"Extracurricular Class of Heart-pounding Love!" "Koi no Doki Doki Kagaijūgyō!" (Japanese: 恋のドキドキ課外授業!)	12 March 2001
3	"Love Panic with the Transfer Student!" "Tenkōsei de Rabu Panikku!" (Japanese: 転校生でラブぱにっく!)	19 March 2001
4	"Big Pinch on the Bus with Shikigami!" "Shikigami Basu de Dai Pinchi!" (Japanese: 式神バスで大ピンチ!)	26 March 2001
5	"A Round of Crisis in a Girl's Feelings!" "Otomegokoro Kiki Ippatsu!" (Japanese: 乙女心危機イッパツ!)	2 April 2001
6	"False Lover" "Itsuwari no Koibito" (Japanese: いつわりの恋人)	9 April 2001
7	"Decisive Battle After School!" "Kessen no Hōkagu Batoru!" (Japanese: 決戦の放課後バトル!)	16 April 2001
8	"Wake Up, Dragon God! Shinsenron!" "Mezameyo Ryūjin! Shinsenron!" (Japanese: 目覚めよ龍神!シンシェンロン!)	23 April 2001
9	"Papa's Epic Feng Shui Battle!" "Papa no Fūsui Daisakusen!" (Japanese: パパの風水大作戦!)	30 April 2001
10	"Cute Shikigami! Here Comes Nanao!" "Kawaii Shikigami! Nanao Sanjō!" (Japanese: カワイイ式神!七尾参上!)	7 May 2001
11	"Shinagawa the Man's Love in Full Bloom!" "Otoko Shinagawa Rabu Mankai!" (Japanese: オトコ品川ラブ満開!)	14 May 2001
12	"Mysterious! Tarot Labyrinth" "Fushigi! Tarotto Rabirinsu" (Japanese: 不思議!タロットラビリンス)	21 May 2001
13	"Invincible Friendship Rainbow!" "Muteki no Yūjō Reinbō!" (Japanese: 無敵の友情レインボウ!)	28 May 2001
14	"Special Love Ring!" "Ai no Tokusetsu Ringu!" (Japanese: 愛の特設リング!)	4 June 2001
15	"Victory is Pink, Pink, Pink!" "Shōri no Pinku! Pinku! Pinku!" (Japanese: 勝利のピンク!ぴんく!Pink!)	11 June 2001
16	"Heart-Pounding Dangerous Live Broadcast!" "Tokimeki Abunai Namahōsō!" (Japanese: トキメキあぶない生放送!)	18 June 2001
17	"Dreaded Meeting at School!?" "Kyōfu, Gakkō no Kaidan!?" (Japanese: 恐怖、学校のカイダン!?)	25 June 2001
18	"Last Trap of the Battle!" "Ikusaritsu no Rasuto Torappu!" (Japanese: 戦りつのラストトラップ!)	2 July 2001
19	"Time to Change Your Heart!" "Toki wa Nate Yua Hāto!" (Japanese: ときはなてユアハート!)	9 July 2001
20	"Temptation of a Suspenseful Date!?" "Yūwaku no Harahara Dēto!?" (Japanese: 誘惑のハラハラデート!?)	16 July 2001
21	"Glittering Great Reversal of Star Trap!" "Hoshi no Wana Kirameki no Taigyakuten!" (Japanese: 星の罠きらめきの大逆転!)	23 July 2001
22	"Tian Xia Wu Di of Happiness!" "Shiawase no Tin Hā Mō Tekku!" (Japanese: しあわせのティン・ハー・モー・テック!)	30 July 2001
23	"Rinrin, Meirin, Dr. Rin?!" (Japanese: リンリン明鈴Dr.リン!?)	6 August 2001
24	"Love, Fireworks, and Red Flowers" "Koi to Hanabi to Akai Hana" (Japanese: 恋と花火と赤い花)	13 August 2001
25	"An Octopus Beach Story!" "Tako no Kaigan Monogatari" (Japanese: タコの海岸物語)	20 August 2001
26	"SOS! Tokiwa Dogfight" (Japanese: SOS! 常盤ドッグファイト)	27 August 2001
27	"Pure!? Lunch Wars!" "Junjō!? Ranchi Wōzu!" (Japanese: 純情!? ランチウォーズ!)	3 September 2001
28	"Rinrin Shock! The Stolen Crystal Ball" "Rinrin Shokku! Ubawareta Suishō-dama" (Japanese: リンリンショック! うばわれた水晶玉)	10 September 2001
29	"The Storm of the Antique Watch!" "Arashi no Antīku Wotchi!" (Japanese: 嵐のアンティークウォッチ!)	17 September 2001
30	"Something Happened! Dinosaur!!" "Taihenda zo! Dainasō!!" (Japanese: タイヘンだぞー! ダイナソー!!)	24 September 2001
31	"The Power is Lost! Dr. Rin Disappeared" "Ushinawareta-ryoku! Kieta Dr. Rin" (Japanese: 失われた力! 消えたDr.リン)	1 October 2001
32	"Ready Go! Rebirth of Compass" "Redī Gō! Rapan Shinsei" (Japanese: レディーゴー! 羅盤新生)	8 October 2001
33	"Strong Earthquake! The Crisis of Haiyun City" "Gekishin! Kaiun-chō Kuraishisu" (Japanese: 激震! 海雲町クライシス)	15 October 2001
34	"Dangerous Mission! Fix the Dragon Pulse!" "Kiken'na Misshon! Ryūmyaku o Tadase!" (Japanese: 危険なミッション! 龍脈をただせ!)	22 October 2001
35	"Zàijiàn... Goodbye Rinrin" "Zàijiàn... Sayonara Rinrin" (Japanese: Zàijiàn[ツァイツェン]。。。さよならリンリン)	29 October 2001
36	"Little Brother's Girlfriend" "Onīchan no Koibito" (Japanese: お兄ちゃんの恋人)	5 November 2001
37	"The Four Gods! Legend of the Precious Jade" "Shishin Densetsu! Hōgyoku no Yukue" (Japanese: 四神伝説! 宝玉のゆくえ)	12 November 2001
38	"The Stranded Meirin! Tokiwa Wakes Up" "Torawareta Meirin! Tokiwa Kakusei" (Japanese: 囚われた明鈴! 常盤覚醒)	19 November 2001
39	"High Tension! Assault of Edi & Banri" "Hai Tension! Totsugeki Edi & Banri" (Japanese: ハイテンション! 突撃エディ & 万里)	26 November 2001
40	"Where is Asuka? Lost Memory" "Asuka-kun Doko? Ushinawareta Kioku" (Japanese: 飛鳥くんどこ? 失われた記憶)	3 December 2001
41	"Why, Asuka!? The Emissary from the Darkness" "Asuka-kun Naze!? Yami kara no Shisha" (Japanese: 飛鳥くんなぜ!? 闇からの使者)	10 December 2001
42	"Asuka Returns! The Unforgettable Christmas Tree" "Asuka-kun Kite! Omoide no Kurisumasu Tsurī" (Japanese: 飛鳥くんきて! 思い出のクリスマスツリー)	17 December 2001
43	"The miracle on Christmas Eve! The Awakening Green Dragon" "Seiya (Ibu) no Kiseki! Yomigaere Seiryū!" (Japanese: 聖夜[イヴ]の奇跡! よみがえれ青龍!)	24 December 2001
44	"Azusa's Secret of the Dark Priestress" "Azusa no Omoi Yami no Miko no Himitsu" (Japanese: アズサの想い闇の巫女のひみつ)	7 January 2002
45	"Electric Kiss 5 Seconds Ago!" "Girigiri Kiss 5-byō Mae!" (Japanese: ギリギリkiss5秒前!)	14 January 2002
46	"Black Assault! The King of Darkness Descends" "Kuroi Shōgeki! Yami no ōkōrin" (Japanese: 黒い衝撃! 闇の王降臨)	21 January 2002
47	"The Tragic Love of the Dark Shrine Maiden Falls!" "Hiren Yami no Miko Chiru!" (Japanese: 悲恋闇の巫女散る!)	28 January 2002
48	"Clash! The Tower of the Four Evils" "Gekitotsu! Shikyō no Tō" (Japanese: 激突! 四凶の塔)	4 February 2002
49	"The Last Hope, the Fifth Member!" "Saigo no Kibō 5-ninme no Nakama!" (Japanese: 最後の希望5人目の仲間!)	11 February 2002
50	"The Dark Shines! Memories of Love" "Yami o Terase! Ai no Kioku" (Japanese: 闇をてらせ! 愛の記憶)	18 February 2002
51	"Good Fortune has Come" "Hǎo yùn láile [Haoyunraira]" (Japanese: 好运来了[ハオユンライラ])	25 February 2002
