= Super Robot Mach Baron =

- Title card
- Created by: Koichi Takano
- Country of origin: Japan
- Original language: Japanese
- No. of episodes: 26

Production
- Running time: 30 minutes

Original release
- Network: Nippon Television
- Release: October 7, 1974 – March 31, 1975

Related
- Super Robot Red Baron

Super Robot Mach Baron (スーパーロボット マッハバロン, Sūpā Robotto Mahha Baron) is a Japanese tokusatsu series that aired from October 7, 1974, to March 31, 1975. It was a sequel to Super Robot Red Baron. Unlike Super Robot Red Baron that was produced by Senkosha, this show was instead produced by Nihon Gendai Kikaku and broadcast on Nippon Television.

In Taiwan, the series was adapted into an 86-minute feature film called The Iron Superman, which used footage from the original series as well as new footage of Hong Kong actors replacing the original Japanese cast not unlike Mighty Morphin' Power Rangers. That movie was also released in Spain (under the title "Mazinger Z - El robot de las estrellas", even though it bore no relation to Mazinger Z) and Germany ("Roboter der Sterne").

In 1977, a third sequel series was produced called; Ganbaron.

== Episodes ==
1. Sortie to Mach Baron Akatsuki
2. Fang of the Sky Trap of the Sea
3. Mach Baron Robbery Plan
4. Kiss Submarine Base Bombing Order
5. Bet on that Moment!
6. Tokyo Bombing 5 Hours
7. 10 Seconds of Decision!
8. Horrible Suicide Squad
9. Glass Super Robot
10. Illusion of Giant Baron
11. Betrayal Senjogahara
12. Invincible Chogokin Robot
13. The Terrifying UFO Identity
14. Mach Colleder Dedicated to a Friend
15. Shiver! Sniper Q
16. Finger Man Sea
17. Desperate Despair! Matchbox Strategy
18. The Great Invention of Invention Criminals
19. Angel from Hell
20. Operation Troy 1 to 1
21. Take the Route South-Southwest
22. Chase! Phoenix Mystery
23. Lullar Angry Hell Operation
24. Hydrogen Bomb Limited 900KM
25. Trump is Pile X
26. Mach Baron's Super Secret
