= Super Robot Red Baron =

- Title card
- Genre: Science fiction; Mecha; Tokusatsu; Kyodai Hero
- Created by: Yashiro Nobohiro
- Directed by: Kiyoshi Suzuki, Koichi Takano, Tetsuro Sotoyama, Hiroshi Fukuhara, Toshishugu Suzuki, Shozo Tamura
- Starring: Yousuke Okada; Tetsuya Oshita
- Composer: Bob Sakuma
- Country of origin: Japan
- Original language: Japanese
- No. of episodes: 39

Production
- Running time: 30 minutes
- Production company: Senkosha Productions

Original release
- Network: Nippon Television
- Release: July 4, 1973 – March 27, 1974

Related
- Super Robot Mach Baron

Super Robot Red Baron (スーパーロボット レッドバロン, Sūpā Robotto Reddo Baron) is a Japanese tokusatsu series that aired from July 4, 1973, to March 27, 1974. It was produced by Nippon Gendai Kikaku and Senkosha Productions (Senko Planning). Its story was later retold in the anime Red Baron and it had a sequel titled Super Robot Mach Baron.

== Plot ==
The show is set in the early 21st century where the Iron Masked Party, led by Dr. Devilar, steals giant robots built all over the world from an exhibition and kidnap their creators to form a "Robot Empire". Scientist Kenichiro Kurenai, foreseeing his capture, turns over his own super robot, Red Baron, to his younger brother Ken Kureinai. Ken is a member of SSI (Secret Science Investigation), a highly skilled team of scientists that practice ninjitsu, and uses Red Baron to aid the team in their efforts to stop the Iron Masked Party from taking over the world. Later in the series, the Iron Masked Party is revealed to be an organization from Mars and led by the renegade super computer Garis Q and intends to destroy the world as practice before taking over the universe.

== Episode list ==
#	Title	Guest cast	Director	Air Date
1.	Conspiracy of the Robot Empire; Robotto Teikoku no Innbo ロボット帝国の陰謀	Hideko Kuroda	Kiyoshi Suzuki	July 4, 1973
2.	Violent Clash! The Baron Break; Gekitou! Baron Bureiku 激突! バロンブレイク	Chidori Tashiro	Kiyoshi Suzuki	July 11, 1973
3.	Trump Card: Android X Kiributa Wa Andoroido Ekkusu 切り札はアンドロイドX	Nobuyuki Ishida	Koichi Takano	July 18, 1973
4.	Certain Death! The Phoenix Maneuver; Hissatsu! Fenikkusu Senhou 必殺! フェニックス戦法	Nobuyuki Ishida	Koichi Takano	July 25, 1973
5.	Crush the Mysterious Rocket Operation! Datou! Nazo no Roketto Sakusen 打倒! 謎のロケット作戦	Yosuke Akimoto	Tetsuo Sotoyama	August 1, 1973
6.	Red Baron Combat Disabled! Reddo Baron Sentou Funoe レッドバロン 戦斗不能!	Yosuke Akimoto	Tetsuo Sotoyama	August 8, 1973
7.	Red Balloons Are the Secret Weapon; Himitsu Heiki Wa Akai Fuusen 秘密兵器は赤い風船	Yoko Takagi	Kiyoshi Suzuki	August 15, 1973
8.	Invincible! Devil of the Desert; Muteki! Sabaku no Maou 無敵! 砂漠の魔王	Toshihiko Utsumi	Kiyoshi Suzuki	August 22, 1973
9.	Fierce Combat: Uranium Mine in the Mist; Kiri no Uran Ko Soudatsu Sen 霧のウラン鉱 争奪戦	Hideo Kidokoro	Hiroshi Fukuhara	August 29, 1973
10.	Counterstrike! The Destruction Beam; Giyakushu! Hakai Kousen 逆襲! 破壊光線	Nobuo Hirasawa	Hiroshi Fukuhara	September 5, 1973
11.	The Beautiful Assassin; Utsushiki Ansatsusha 美しき暗殺者	Hiroshi Izumida	Tetsuo Sotoyama	September 12, 1973
12.	Putting Bet Your Life on One Shot! Konno Ichigeki Ni Inochi Ni Kakerou この一撃に命をかけろ!	Rie Mizuki; Atsunori Sugiyama	Koichi Takano	September 19, 1973
13.	10 Minutes Until 5 Cities Are Obliterated; Godai Toshi Bakuha Juppun Mae 五大都市 爆破10分前	Seishiro Kuno; Chigako Sono; Nagisa Koyama; Masahiko Arima	Tetsuo Sotoyama	September 26, 1973
14.	Enigma of the Invulnerable Robot; Fujimi Robotto no Nazo 不死身ロボットの謎		Koichi Takano	October 3, 1973
15.	The Foretold Trap; Yokoku Sareta Wana 予告された罠		Kiyoshi Suzuki	October 10, 1973
16.	Iron Alliance Fugitive E-16; Tetsumen Tou Dasou Han "Ii" Juurokugo 鉄面党脱走犯E16号	Yoshio Katsube; Haruo Suzuki; Shigeo Kato	Toshitsugu Suzuki	October 17, 1973
17.	A Tale Penned by the Devil; Akuma Ga Kaeta Wa 悪魔の書いた話	Fudeko Tanaka	Kiyoshi Suzuki	October 24, 1973
18.	Behold! The End of Red Baron; Miyo! Reddo Baron no Saigo 見よ! レッドバロンの最後		Toshitsugu Suzuki	October 31, 1973
19.	The Beautiful Pilot of Evil; Utsushiki Akuma no Hikoushi 美しき悪魔の操縦士	Katsuyo Sunaga	Hiroshi Fukuhara	November 7, 1973
20.	Watch Out! SSI; Ayaushi! Esu Esu Ai 危し! SSI	Hideo Nihei	Tetsuo Sotoyama	November 14, 1973
21.	Modify Red Baron; Reddo Baron Ou Kaizou Seioh レッドバロンを改造せよ	Kinji Takinami; Saburo Kadowaki	Hiroshi Fukuhara	November 21, 1973
22.	Red Baron in Danger; Reddo Baron Kiki Ippatsu レッドバロン 危機一髪	Retsu Mori	Tetsuo Sotoyama	November 28, 1973
23.	Letter of Challenge from Outer Space; Uchuu Kara no Chosenjou 宇宙からの挑戦状	Yoichi Miyagawa; Kazuo Suzuki	Kiyoshi Suzuki	December 5, 1973
24.	Smash the Deadly Cosmic Weapon! Yabure! Uchuu no Himitsu Heiki 破れ! 宇宙の秘密兵器	Yoichi Miyagawa; Kazuo Suzuki	Kiyoshi Suzuki	December 12, 1973
25.	The 7 Secrets of Red Baron; Reddo Baron Nanatsu no Himitsu レッドバロン7つの秘密	Yoichi Miyagawa	Toshitsugu Suzuki	December 19, 1973
26.	The Fall of Deviler's Iron Alliance; Tetsumen Tou Debiraa no Saigo 鉄面党デビラーの最後	Yoichi Miyagawa	Toshitsugu Suzuki	December 26, 1973
27.	Invasion of the Space Robots; Uchuu Robotto no Shurai 宇宙ロボットの襲来		Shozo Tamura	January 2, 1974
28.	Goldfinger; Goorudo Fingaa ゴールドフィンガー	Toshio Chikamatsu	Shozo Tamura	January 9, 1974
29.	3 Robot Brothers of the Iron Alliance; Tetsumen Tou Robotto San Kyodai 鉄面党ロボット3兄弟	Ryoichi Yamazaki; Eiji Karasawa	Tetsuo Sotoyama	January 16, 1974
30.	The Boy Who Controlled Red Baron; Reddo Baron Ou Ayatsuru Shonen レッドバロンをあやつる少年	Ryoichi Yamazaki; Eiji Karasawa	Tetsuo Sotoyama	January 23, 1974
31.	The Terryfing Apple Bombs; Kyofu no Ringo Bakudan 恐怖のリンゴ爆弾		Toshitsugu Suzuki	January 30, 1974
32.	Remote Controlled Tanks Commence Attack; Remo Kon Sensha Shugeki Kaishi リモコン戦車 襲撃開始		Toshitsugu Suzuki	February 6, 1974
33.	Mystery of the Cosmic Spider Robot; Uchuu No Robotto Kumo no Kai 宇宙ロボット蜘蛛の怪		Koichi Takano	February 13, 1974
34.	The Treacherous Cosmic Express; Uragiri no Uchuu Tokyubin 裏切りの宇宙特急便		Koichi Takano	February 20, 1974
35.	Horror of the Vampire Virus; Kyofu no Kyuketsu Biirusu 恐怖の吸血ビールス	Koetsu Omiya; Emiko Sugawara	Hiroshi Fukuhara	February 27, 1974
36.	The Man from International HQ; Kokusai Honbu Kara Kita Otoko 国際本部から来た男	Koetsu Omiya; Wolf Otsuki	Hiroshi Fukuhara	March 6, 1974
37.	Father's Letter from Across Space; Uchuu Kara Kita Chichi no Tegami 宇宙から来た父の手紙	Makoto Takagiri; Isao Zushi	Kiyoshi Suzuki	March 13, 1974
38.	Red Baron: Disaster on Mars; Reddo Baron Ka Seki Ni Sounan レッドバロン 火星に遭難	Makoto Takagiri; Eisuke Yoda; Isao Zushi	Kiyoshi Suzuki	March 20, 1974
39.	A Clockwork Tomorrow; Kikai Jikake no Ashita 機械じかけの明日	Eisuke Yoda; Isao Zushi	Kiyoshi Suzuki	March 27, 1974

== Cast ==
- Ken Kenichiro: Yosuke Okada
- Mari Matsubara: Rei Maki
- Daisaku Hori: Pepe Hozumi
- Tetsuya Sakai: Hisashi Kato
- Jitsu Osato: Tetsuya Oshita
- Shiro Makami: Tetsuya Ushio
- Ippei Kumano: Isao Tamagawa
- Kenichiro Kurenai/Android X: Nobuyuki Ishida
- Dr. Deviler: Hiroshi Ikaida
DVD case

== Enemy Robots ==
=== Stolen National Robots ===
- Big Bison (America)
- Black Masai (Kenya)
- Agun-Garuda (Indonesia)
- Hiryu (Japan)
- Goryu (China)
- Viking III (Norway)
- Blizzard 7 (Iceland)
- Bedouin G (Arabia)
- Vesuvius Y (Italy)
- Mau Mau (Union of South Africa)
- Garnison Ace (Canada)
- Eleci Amazon (Brazil)
- McKinley V6 (America (Alaska))
- King John Bull (England)
- Proto-Andes (Peru)
- Iron Cross G (West Germany)
- Gran Matador (Spain)
- Rajasthan (India)
- Magma Wolf (Japan)
- Sphinxer (Egypt)
- Escargos (France)
- Mongol Star (Mongolia)

=== Iron Masked Party Originals ===
- Troy Horse
- Schekler Robot
- Sky Shark
- King Devilar
- Martian Saturn
- Gold Finger
- Bem Panthers 01, 02, and 03
- Devil Ghoster
- Mars Bird
- Spider Robot
- Donkey One
- Dracubat
- Deimos Z
