= Magical Emi, the Magic Star =

Magical girl television anime series by Studio Pierrot

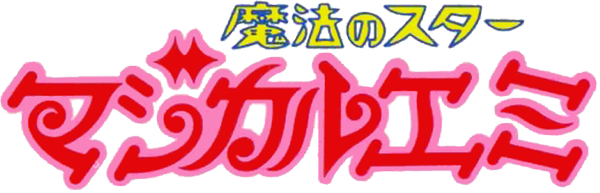
- 魔法のスターマジカルエミ
- Genre: Magical girl
- Developed by: Hiroshi Konishikawa; Mami Watanabe
- Directed by: Takashi Anno
- Music by: Keiichi Oku
- Country of origin: Japan
- Original language: Japanese
- No. of episodes: 38 (list of episodes)

Production
- Executive producer: Yuji Nunokawa
- Producers: Toru Horikoshi (NTV); Minoru Ohno (Yomiko)
- Production company: Studio Pierrot

Original release
- Network: NNS (NTV)
- Release: June 7, 1985 – February 28, 1986

Related
- Manga
- Written by: Kiyoko Arai
- Published by: Shogakukan
- Magazine: Shojo Comic
- Original run: 1985 – 1986
- Volumes: 3
- Original video animation

Mahō no Star Magical Emi Finale! Finale!
- Directed by: Takashi Anno
- Music by: Keiichi Oku
- Studio: Studio Pierrot
- Released: May 25, 1986
- Runtime: 17 minutes
- Original video animation

Mahō no Star Magical Emi Semishigure
- Directed by: Takashi Anno
- Music by: Keiichi Oku
- Studio: Studio Pierrot
- Released: September 28, 1986
- Runtime: 60 minutes

Magical Emi, the Magic Star (魔法のスターマジカルエミ, Mahō no Sutā Majikaru Emi) is a magical girl anime series by Studio Pierrot. It was simultaneously released as a manga by Kiyoko Arai. The third magical girl series created by Studio Pierrot, Magical Emi also appears in two feature-length OVAs, as well as the Adesugata Mahou no Sannin Musume and Majokko Club Yoningumi A-Kukan Kara no Alien X OVAs.

== Plot ==
Mai Kazuki is from a family of magicians. Her grandparents are leaders of a troupe, Magic Carat, and their daughter — Mai's mother — debuted under them. Naturally, Mai wants to become a magician herself, just like her hero, the fabulous legend Emily Howell, but because she is still a young girl, she is very clumsy and unsure.

One day, while helping her grandfather move things, Mai sees a strange light enter an odd, heart-shaped mirror and turn into a mirror fairy named Topo. He takes over the body of her favorite stuffed toy, a flying squirrel doll, and explains that he must give magic to the one who can see him. He gives her a bracelet with the symbols of the 4 card suits (spade, club, diamond and heart) which produces a magic wand. By waving the wand, Mai becomes Magical Emi, a teenage magician. She stars in her grandparents' shows, and uses magic to help solve problems, but at the end of the day, she wants to become a magician all by herself.

== Characters ==
=== Nakamori family ===
- Jōji Yanami as Yosuke Nakamori
- Atsuko Mine as Haruko Nakamori

=== Troupe Magic Carat ===
- Yū Mizushima as Sho Yuki
- Maya Okamoto as Yukiko Hirota
- Sukekiyo Kameyama as Akira Matsuo
- Kameyama Sukekiyo as Susumi Siozawa
- Naoki Tatsuta as Topo

=== Kazuki family ===
- Aoki Nana as Yoko Kazuki
- Rokurō Naya as Junichi Kazuki
- Yoko Obata as Mai Kazuki/Magical Emi
- Yūko Mita as Misaki Kazuki

=== Koganei family ===
- Daisuke Gouri as Shigeru Koganei
- Kazue Ikura as Musashi Koganei
- Shigeru Chiba as Madoka Kokubunji

=== Others ===
- Shinya Ohtaki as Akira

== Music ==
=== Original songs ===
By Yoko Obata

1. Mysterious Color Happiness (Japanese: 不思議色ハピネス, Hepburn: Fushigi-Iro Happiness) (OP)
  - It also frequently appears in the play as a song sung by Emi and Hideaki Tokunaga.
2. Dreaming Only Of You (Japanese: あなただけDreaming, Hepburn: Anata Dake Dreaming) (ED)
3. Tropical Mermaid (Japanese: 南国人魚姫, Hepburn: Nangoku Ningyo Hime)
  - It appears as Emi's new song from episode 32.

== Anime ==
The 38-episode anime series, directed by Takashi Anno and produced by Studio Pierrot, aired from June 7, 1985, to February 28, 1986. The opening theme song is "Fushigi-Iro Happiness" and the ending theme song is "Anata Dake Dreaming", both by Yōko Obata.

No.	Title	Original release date
1	"A Wonder Is Born! Magical Star!!" "Wandāwa, umare te imasu! Mahō no sutā!!"(ふしぎ誕生 魔法のスター)	7 June 1985
After being given an enchanted mirror by her grandfather, Mai, a clumsy, aspiring magician, gains the power to transform into a teenage professional magician named Emi. With this power, she becomes the star of her family's magical troupe, Magic Carat.
2	"Debut by Magic! Magical Star Live Broadcast!!" "Debyūmajikku! Mahō no sutā wa hōsō raibu!!"(魔法でデビュー！生放送！！)	14 June 1985
After being observed by a television producer at their performance, Magic Carat is given the opportunity to appear on television regularly, assuming their first live show goes well. Things get a bit dicey however as Mai is expected to be at the movies with her parents and baby brother at the time of the broadcast, and can't think of an excuse to get out of her family outing without revealing her hidden identity.
3	"The Guy That Likes Boxing" "Aitsu no Suki na dansei Bokushingu"(あいつの好きなボクシング)	21 June 1985
At school, Shou becomes popular with the girls due to his boxing skills, but this also creates some tension with him and the other boxing team members, as Shou tends to come and go as he pleases (mostly due to the fact that he is often helping with Magic Carat). Eventually, the boxing club captain challenges Shou to a match, hoping to defuse the growing animosity the other club members feel towards Shou, and his perceived slacking. Akira soon becomes sick, and with no one else to go to for help, Grandma and Grandpa Nakamori ask Shou to take his place in the Magic Carat show. Shou reluctantly asks his team captain for a two hour delay in the match, and, at the risk of losing his place in the club if he's late, the captain accepts. After performing, Shou and Mai race back to the school, just barely making it in time for him to fight the team captain. The match ends in a tie, and Shou agrees to practice with the team more regularly.
4	"The Color of Wonder: Happiness" "Fushigi iro, hapinesu"(不思議色ハピネス)	28 June 1985
With Emi's recent rise in popularity, Koganei decides to expand her audience by having her debut as an idol instead of as a regular entertainer. A brief misunderstanding however has Grandma Nakamori believing that everyone will be singing, not just Emi. When the misunderstanding is revealed, Emi refuses to sing without the other Magic Carat members. Koganei begs her to debut alone in order to save his reputation, which troubles her greatly. Eventually, Mai comes up with an idea where she'll still be the main focus, but all of the troupe members can still be involved.
5	"Star Festival Fantasy in the Rain" "Ame de Tanabata Fantajī"(雨のたなばたファンタジー)	5 July 1985
While getting ready for the Tanabata Festival, Misaki becomes aware of how clumsy his sister is, which seems to bother him. The two prepare their wishes, and Misaki refuses to tell anyone what he wrote, but it rains on the day of the festival, causing the children to worry that their wishes will not be granted, as Orihime and Hikoboshi cannot meet without a clear sky. Misaki is greatly distressed by this, and despite everyone's efforts to cheer him up, he remains upset. Shou brings him to the Magic Carat show, where Emi, masquerading as Orihime, shows him a vision, and promises to grant his wish. It is then revealed that Misaki wished to become the World's Best Magician, as he believes his sister would be too clumsy to do it herself.
6	"Holding Shinings of a Star in Secret" "himitsu no hoshi no mochikabu Shinings"(スターの輝きを秘めて)	12 July 1985
Mai's classmate (and Koganei's son), Musashi invites Mai to go see a romance movie with him after school. Although she initially does not want to go, some teasing from Shou changes her mind. In the packed theatre, Mai sees an old woman being pushed around by the crowd, and offers her seat for the woman to have. Noticing this act of kindness, a man goes to stand with Mai, allowing her to use his briefcase as a step-stool so she can see over the crowd. As a thank you, Mai gives the man two tickets to Magic Carat. A later scene with Koganei and the mystery man reveals that he is actually the director of the movie, and Koganei tries to persuade him into casting Emi in an upcoming film. At the Magic Carat show, Emi notices the mystery man in the crowd, and gives him a bouquet and a wink, which makes the man furious, as he believes she's doing it in hopes of swaying him. Emi, however, is oblivious to this, and remains confused and a bit angry herself at his reaction to what she meant as a simple kind gesture. Koganei gets the two to sit down and talk things out together.
7	"Home Ec. Primer During Summer Break" "Hōmu no Ec。 Puraimā natsuyasumi chū"(夏休み家庭科入門)	19 July 1985
After receiving a low-grade in Home Ec, Mai becomes acutely aware of the different standards that men and women are held to in society. The hypocrisy of the men in her life who will tell her she needs to be a perfect housewife, while still doing nothing useful for themselves, makes her furious, and this only intensifies when her mother falls ill due to her father's incessant demands. Mai takes over many of her mother's duties for the day, and truly begins to understand how difficult it is to be a woman and live under those heavy expectations.
8	"The Best Kid on the Beach" "Bīchi no besuto Kiddo"(海辺のベストキッド)	26 July 1985
When Magic Carat travels to a beach-side town for a summer performance, Mai makes friends with a group of local boys, and plays with them all day.
9	"I Hate Boxing!" "Watashi wa Bokushingu girai!"(ボクシングなんて大嫌い！)	2 August 1985
After a Magic Carat show, a teenage boy approaches Emi, and asks for a handshake. He reveals that he is a boxer, and thinks some of her luck will rub off on him and help him win his match. Mai attends the match with Shou, and she comes to hate boxing after seeing how hurt the competitors get. Mai/Emi begin to vocally oppose boxing for its brutality, and this aversion only strengthens when Shou decides to fight the undefeated boxer from earlier.
10	"Highland Train — Where is the UFO!?" "Hairando wa Torein - doko UFO no desu!?"(高原列車UFOはどこ！？)	9 August 1985
After seeing a broadcast on UFOs, Mai and Misaki go by train to try and see one for themselves. On the long train ride, they meet a strange woman names Beebee, who claims to be an alien princess, and tells the siblings that the UFO has actually been looking for her. On the journey back, a sudden electrical storm causes the train to stop indefinitely, and a fight breaks out between some women on the train. Mai transforms into Emi to try and keep the peace, and manages to catch a glimpse into who Beebee really is: a singer who got stage fright and lost her confidence, giving up on her dream. As Emi, Mai reminds her that everyone gets stage fright, and encourages her. Later on, Beebee returns to Tokyo to continue chasing her dream, and Toppo reveals that the "UFO" was actually another one of his kind.
11	"The Secret Life of a Star" "Himitsu no Sutaraifu"(秘密のスターライフ)	16 August 1985
Although rising quickly in fame, Magical Emi is a bit of a mystery in the entertainment world, as her secret split identity makes it difficult to get any info on her. When Koganei proposes a 24-hour deep-dive into Emi's personal life for a TV special, Mai vehemently refuses. Koganei, not wanting to disappoint his boss, tricks Emi into doing the documentary by lying and saying it is a drama, forcing her to unknowingly show fans a completely dishonest interpretation of her life. When Emi inevitably finds out, she reluctantly allows the drama to continue, but luckily, Koganei's boss changes the editing to make the documentary about Koganei instead of Emi, allowing her to keep her secrecy.
12	"Summer is Glowing-colored Memories" "Natsu ha Hikari shoku no Memorī"(夏は光色のメモリー)	23 August 1985
The Magic Carat troupe makes a summer trip to Firefly Valley, to visit Grandma Nakamori's cousin, a photographer named Tokuji. That night, however, a group of construction workers who have been building a hotel come to ask Magic Carat for their help in ridding the valley of some ghosts, who have driven off most of the construction workers. The troupe takes up the challenge, but are scared off when the ghosts really do appear. As they are running away, Mai trips and hits her head, and when she comes to, she discovers that Uncle Tokuji is behind the "haunting". Out of anger, Mai promises the workers that Emi will uncover the truth, and sets out the next night (followed by a film crew). After getting past the fake ghosts, Emi asks Tokuji why he would do such a thing, but is stopped short when the fireflies begin to glow around them. The construction workers decide not to disrupt such a beautiful area, so Tokuji can rest well knowing that his late wife's memory persists in the place she loved.
13	"The Home Tutor is 16 Years Old" "Kateikyōshi ha 16 Sai"(家庭教師は16才)	30 August 1985
Due to all her time spent playing around instead of studying, Mai has to rush to complete her summer homework and get her grades up, especially after her father ups the ante by forbidding her from doing magic until she's done. Mai's mother enlists Shou to tutor her, but Mai becomes restless when she finds out that Magic Carat will lose their TV spot if Emi misses the broadcast. When Shou leaves, Mai takes her chance to sneak out and transform, assumedly behind his back. Shou however reveals to Emi that he'd actually advocated for Mai to her father, so that she could attend the show and stop worrying for Magic Carat. This brings the two a bit closer, and Mai seems to be developing feelings for him.
14	"Kotemaridai's Flowery Stage" "Kotemari-dai Hana no Sutēji"(こてまり台 花のステージ)	6 September 1985
For the first time, Mai is given the chance to do her own solo magic performance at the Big Bang. After telling Musashi, he turns it into a school-wide event, encouraging everyone to come and support her. When Mai sees the venue however, she realizes that she is actually performing on a small, separate set up, and not the Big Bang stage as she'd accidentally led her classmates to believe. When Mai tries to rectify the misunderstanding, she is unable to, which causes her so much stress that she develops a fever. Her mother decides to take up the set in her place, but Mai has a change of heart, and decides to give it her best after all.
15	"The Pinwheel the Wind Left Behind" "Kaze ga Nokashita Kazaguruma"(風が残したかざぐるま)	13 September 1985
As the town readies for an oncoming typhoon, Mai meets a strange girl in the park, who seems to be able to control the wind. This mysterious girl, Shelley, is very powerful, but clumsy. Although Mai thinks she is an ordinary girl, Toppo worries that there's something off about her. On the day the typhoon hits, Shelley comes to the bakery to help out, and Toppo convinces Mai to transform into Emi and speak to her. Shelley reveals to Emi that she is actually a Wind Fairy, who was stranded in the human world due to the fact that she doesn't have enough magical power to return by herself. Because Emi is scheduled to do live magic in the storm, Shelley asks her to help her return home.
16	"Wonderful Powerful Driver" "Suteki Pawafuru Doraibā"(すてきパワフルドライバー)	20 September 1985
After giving Yukiko permission to drive his new car, Kokobunji, Yukiko, Mai and Musashi end up being dangerously stalked by a freight truck due to Yukiko's reckless driving. Shou and the others try to catch up to them.
17	"Wavering Feelings, the School Festival" "Kibun hayurete gakuensai"(気分はゆれて学園祭)	27 September 1985
Mai is excitedly practicing new tricks for the magic contest at the school festival, only to have her hopes dashed when she finds out that Emi is supposed to be judging. On the other hand, Shou has been tasked with both acting as a date for the boxing club captain's sister, and being Emi's bodyguard. Not knowing of Mai's split identity, Shou asks her to take his place guiding Emi around the school, which causes some tension when she notices that he's seemingly shirking his responsibility for a date.
18	"The Magic Light of Dreams" "Mahō no Hikari ni Yume wo"(魔法の光に夢を)	4 October 1985
A strange young boy shows up at a Magic Carat show, demanding to see Emi. Mai ignores him, but later that day, she sees him again, and the magical mirror starts to sparkle, indicating that the boy might be a fairy. That night, the boy breaks in to the house where the troupe, Shou, and Mai's grandparent's live, searching for Emi to no avail. After he is discovered and the ensuing chase to catch him, the boy reveals that he needs Emi to put some magic in a bottle for him. Mai obliges, and the boy runs off, proving once and for all that he's a fairy as he vanishes in a cloud of sparkling light.
19	"Romance through the Glass" "Garasu koshi no Romansu"(ガラス越しのロマンス)	11 October 1985
When walking home from the store with her grandfather, time seems to stop for Mai when she notices a victorian-doll in an antique store window. Feeling as if the doll was calling out to her for some reason, Mai decides to purchase it, despite the store clerk's ominous statement that he "wouldn't recommend it". At home, Mai notices that the doll's reflection in the magical mirror is always crying, and--on her grandfather's advice--she sets out to listen to the doll's heart. When she connects with the doll's memories through the mirror, she sees the view from the antique store window, and a sailor doll sitting in the cafe opposite, which causes her doll to stop crying. Mai goes and retrieves the sailor doll, bringing the two together. When she does so, the spirits of two fairies transfer from the dolls into the magical mirror.
20	"Dangerous Shutter Chance" "Kiken na shattāchansu"(危険なシャッターチャンス)	18 October 1985
As Emi begins to reach a respectable level of fame in the entertainment industry, Koganei becomes worried when a popular tabloid reporter, Kawagoe, takes interest in her. Fearing a scandal, Koganei demands that Emi and Shou stop spending time together, in hopes of reducing the chances that their relationship will be misrepresented by the media. Just when they think that they are in the clear, Kawagoe makes it known that he plans on getting that shot, no matter what. Instead of laying back and waiting it out, Emi and the others take the paparazzi on a wild goose chase.
21	"Go for It! Thrilling Game!" "Ganbare! Dokidokigēmu"(がんばれ！ドキドキゲーム)	25 October 1985
Musashi enters a TV special called the Hell Game Challenge, an obstacle-course race, and asks Mai to be his partner. Although she refuses at first because Emi is set to appear at the same time, Mai agrees after being teased by her family and Shou. The pressure is put on Musashi though, as he is not very athletic, but also due to the fact that the show is being run by his father's rival. Musashi trains very hard in preparation, and Koganei attempts to pull some strings so that the show's directors will help out his son in the game. One of the competitors makes fun of Musashi, and tells him that, when [he] wins, he Will date Mai. Trouble arises in the game however when the competitor notices that Musashi is being helped by the staff, and threatens to quit since Musashi is cheating. When Musashi finds out what his father has orchestrated, he forfeits the game.
22	"Dry Fall Wind, Heart Pattern" "Karatto akikaze Kokoro moyō"(からっと秋風 心もよう)	1 November 1985
Susumu is scolded for making a mistake during a Magic Carat performance, and loses his confidence as a result. The other troupe members experience similar self-confidence issues, but things really fall apart when Susumu quits Magic Carat, and leaves their house. Mai's grandparents discuss disbanding Magic Carat as a result, although the other members vehemently refuse. Eventually, Susumu, having thoroughly reassessed his mistake, returns home, and things return to normal.
23	"I'm Sorry, Mii-chan" "Gomenne Mī-chan"(ごめんねミーちゃん)	8 November 1985
When Misaki accidentally ruins a beloved apron that Mai made, she tells him that she hates him, and he later runs away after hearing her say that she wished he didn't exist. His disappearance causes everyone to band together and search for him across the city, and Mai blames herself for being so unforgiving. Meanwhile, Misaki wanders aimlessly, not wanting to go home and further upset his sister, who he loves.
24	"The Bell Tolls Anew" "Suzu no Oto yomō Ichido"(鈴の音よ もう一度)	15 November 1985
Koganei becomes depressed after dropping a special keepsake of his, a bell, which causes it to stop ringing. When Mai asks him what is wrong, he explains that the bell is a precious memento of his first love, a girl named Taeko who he met one year as a child, and that ringing the bell reminds him of her, and the short time they spent together. During a children's audition, Koganei sees a little girl who looks a lot like Taeko, and realizes that she is her daughter. Although he doesn't have the nerve to speak to Taeko again after so long, Mai approaches her and explains things for him, but Taeko doesn't remember, so Mai, as Emi, alters her performance to remind her of the time she and Koganei spent together as children.
25	"The Cute Visitor" "Kawaii Hōmonsha"(かわいい訪問者)	22 November 1985
26	"The Shower of Dead Leaves" "Kareha no Shawā"(枯葉のシャワー)	29 November 1985
27	"Kokubunji's Murder Case" "Kokubunji-san Satsujinjiken"(国分寺さん殺人事件)	6 December 1985
28	"When Luck Goes Down, The Sun Rises" "Tsuki ga Ochire ba Yō ga Noboru"(ツキが落ちれば陽が昇る)	13 December 1985
29	"Snowscapes and Dreamlands" "Yuki keshiki . Yume no Kuni"(雪景色・夢の国)	20 December 1985
30	"The Wine-colored Party" "Wain shoku no Pātei"(ワイン色のパーティー)	27 December 1985
31	"The Jagged Pattern of a Loving Couple" "Naka yoshi Fūfu no Gizagiza Moyō"(仲よし夫婦のギザギザ模様)	10 January 1986
32	"A Prank in the Bathroom!" "O Furoba de Dokkiri!"(お風呂場でドッキリ！)	17 January 1986
33	"Fly! Snowdragon" "Tobe! Sunōdoragon"(飛べ！スノードラゴン)	24 January 1986
34	"Love and Sorrow at Karinto" "Ai to Kanashi mino Karintō"(愛と哀しみのカリントウ)	31 January 1986
35	"Welcome to the Fairy Forest" "Yōsei no mori heyōkoso!"(妖精の森へようこそ！)	7 February 1986
36	"Alone in the North Wind" "Kitakaze Nihitoribocchi"(北風にひとりぼっち)	14 February 1986
37	"A Season of Hesitation" "Tameraino Kisetsu"(ためらいの季節)	21 February 1986
38	"Goodbye Dream Magician" "Sayonara yumeiro Majishan"(さよなら 夢色マジシャン)	28 February 1986
