= Judgement Day (Lovebites album) =

2023 studio album by Lovebites

Studio album by Lovebites
- Released: February 22, 2023
- Studios: Studio Move 705; CPR Studio; DSW Studio; Miyako Studio; Fami Studio
- Genre: Power metal
- Length: 53:29
- Label: Victor
- Producer: Steve Jacobs

Lovebites chronology
Glory, Glory, to the World (2021)	Judgement Day (2023)	Lovebites EP II (2024)

Lovebites studio albums chronology
Electric Pentagram (2020)	Judgement Day (2023)	Outstanding Power (2026)

Judgement Day is the fourth studio album by Japanese power metal band Lovebites. It was released in Japan on February 22, 2023, by Victor Entertainment, and in the United Kingdom two days later by JPU Records. It is the band's first release with Fami, who joined in October 2022 as the replacement for bassist and co-founder Miho. Judgement Day reached number 5 on both the Oricon and Billboard Japan charts, making it the band's highest-charting record to date.

== Background ==
Five months after the release of their third EP, Glory, Glory, to the World, bassist, leader and co-founder Miho left Lovebites on August 17, 2021, and the band temporarily suspended all activities. They accepted auditions for a new bass player between April 2 and May 24, 2022. Guitarist and keyboardist Miyako later said there was no way they were going to continue simply utilizing a support musician. It took the members several days to sort through the nearly 250 people who applied. Vocalist Asami said if they were only looking for technical proficiency, they could have recruited one of their many acquaintances in the music industry, but they wanted someone with that "extra something". According to Asami, the final decision was unanimous amongst the members and their staff. Lovebites revealed Fami as their new bassist on October 21, 2022, via a studio performance video on YouTube.

The other members of Lovebites had already completed recording Judgement Day by this time. Miyako said she had been writing songs since winter 2021. Out of the 20 demos they had for the album, four of the selected songs are her compositions. The band truly started working on the album at the beginning of 2022. Both guitarists recorded their parts at home using Waves GTR, before re-amping in the studio. Miyako used a Dean Icon guitar, re-amped mainly using a Peavey Misha Mansoor amplifier, and is panned to the right channel. Midori used an ESP E-II Horizon guitar, reamped with a Diezel Herbert amplifier (except on "My Orion"), and is panned to the left. Miyako noted how recording the bass last was quite unusual. As soon as Fami was made a member, the guitarist sent her the digital data for the 10 songs on the album and asked her to record the bass parts in the following 2–3 weeks. Although Miyako had included bass on at least some of the demos, Fami significantly changed phrases. Fami admitted she is still a novice to heavy metal, and both Asami and guitarist Midori said with Judgement Day they wanted to create a work that showed people that, despite the lineup change, the band's sound and commitment to metal would remain unaffected. Asami also said she wanted to show both evolution and innovation.

Like all of their releases, it was mixed by Mikko Karmila and mastered by Mika Jussila at Finnvox Studios in Helsinki, Finland. Also returning, The EasyRabbit CreArtions, a duo of Spanish artists David López Gómez and Carlos Vincente León, provided the cover art. It features a wolf sprinting between the Sun and the Moon, while clutching scales that weigh good and evil within its jaws. The wolf, which appears on all but the band's debut release, symbolizes that by playing the non-mainstream genre of heavy metal Lovebites are a "lone wolf" in the music scene.

== Themes ==
The introductory song of the "second chapter" of Lovebites, "We Are the Resurrection" was chosen to be the opening track upon hearing the guitar riff Midori came up with. The guitarist said the song is in drop D tuning and that she created the riff to be crunchy and groovy. Asami, who worked on the song with the band's frequent collaborator Mao, said the first part sounds like thrash metal, but from there it develops in the "usual Lovebites way" and has the impact she expected after first hearing the riff. Midori said the marching rhythm conveys the feeling of "moving forward".

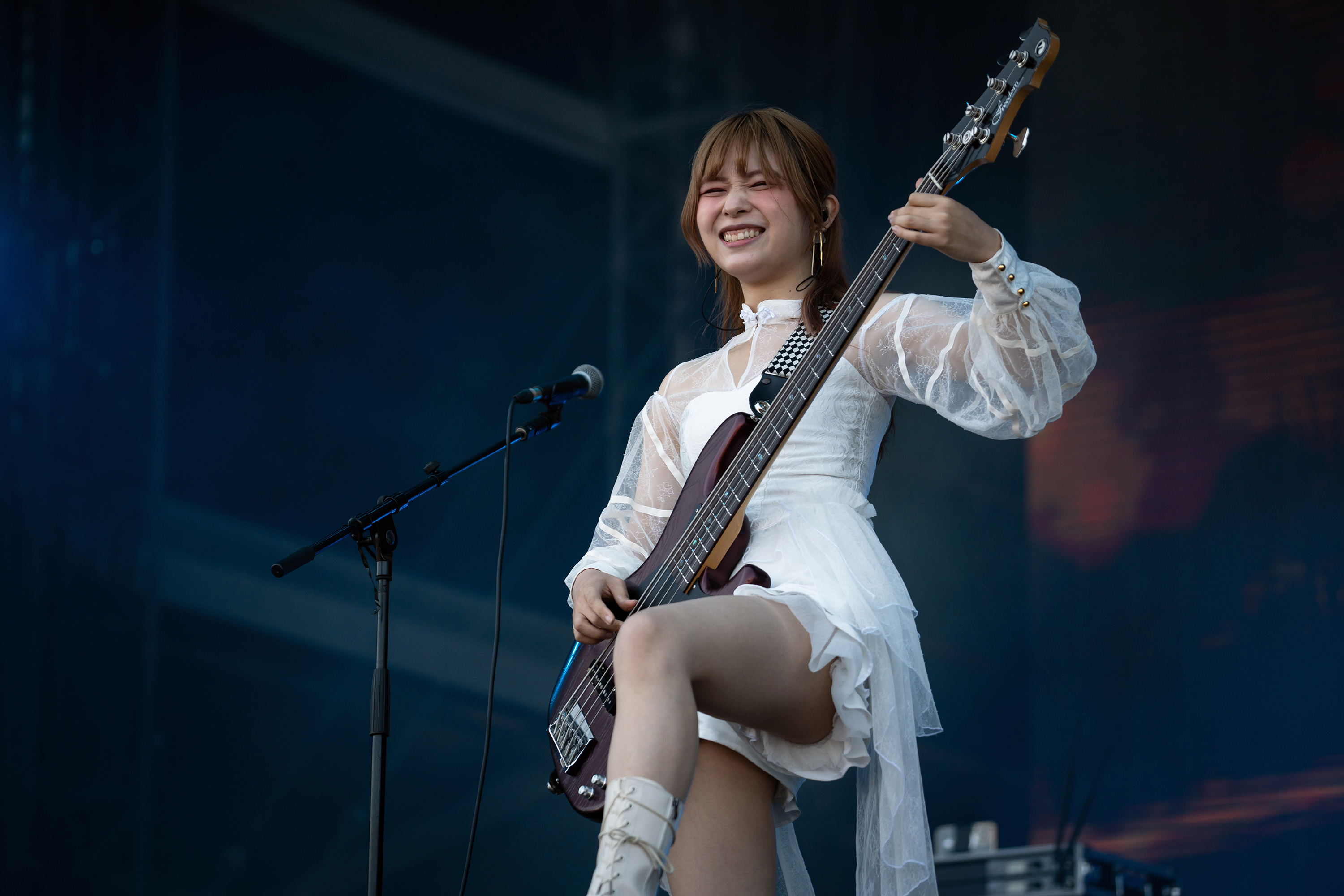
Judgement Day is the band's first release to feature Fami.

Knowing that their first material following the hiatus was going to be "judged", the members decided to have a song titled "Judgement Day". It was the first song they wrote for the album, and bass is intentionally prominent in the intro and outro to show off the band's newest member. Haruna and Miyako both praised how much Fami's final basslines improved upon the demo's originals. Fami said she inserted slapping and tapping phrases because she is good at them. Asami said a key point of the song is the 7/8 time signature, but there are a number of tricky additions, such as slightly changing the riffs. Midori explained how the riff starts in 7/8 time but switches to 8/8, and chose the song as the best guitar track on the album. Haruna cited it as her favorite song on the album, noting that while the same phrase is repeated, she used a different drum pattern each time.

Fami cited the Miyako-composed "Wicked Witch" as her favorite song on the album. She said the phrasing makes it seem as if the bassline is singing and likes how the A melody intertwines with the bassline.

Believing thrash metal to be an essential part of the Lovebites sound, Asami cited "Dissonance" as her favorite track on Judgement Day. She said Mao came up with a lot of good ideas and they ended up with a song that became a "hook" of the album.

"Soldier Stands Solitarily" was originally written for Glory, Glory, to the World but did not make the final cut. Miyako said she felt the melody, particularly the chorus, was too good to reject completely. So she rearranged it for this album, and said it came out 100 times better. She chose it as the best guitar track on the album.

== Release ==
Judgement Day was released in Japan on February 22, 2023, by Victor Entertainment. Limited Editions A and B include a DVD or Blu-ray featuring a documentary on the auditions for a new bass player, the three songs Fami played with the band during the final selection, and the studio performance of "Bravehearted" which was used to reveal her as their new bassist. Limited Edition C instead includes a second CD featuring instrumental versions of all 10 tracks from the album. The tour for the album ran from August 26 to September 24, and ended with a finale titled The Last Judgement on October 5, 2023. Victor released a limited edition 2-disc vinyl LP record version of the album, titled Ashita e no Sabaki (明日への裁き, "Toward Tomorrow's Judgement") in Japanese, on February 22, 2024, with new liner notes by Masanori Ito.

JPU Records released the album in the United Kingdom on February 24, 2023. Their limited editions distribute the video content via a video-on-demand service. 50 people who ordered the edition that features a t-shirt were randomly selected to receive a CD sleeve that was signed by the members of the band.

== Reception ==
Professional ratings
Review scores
Source	Rating
Blabbermouth.net	8/10
BraveWords	9.5/10
Distorted Sound	8/10
Maximum Volume Music	9/10
Metal Hammer	3.5/5 stars

Judgement Day debuted at number 5 on the Oricon Albums Chart with 10,036 copies sold its first week. It also reached number 5 on Billboard Japan's Hot Albums and Top Albums Sales charts, the latter of which is based only on physical sales. Readers of Metal Hammer voted Judgement Day the 15th best metal album of 2023 and "Stand and Deliver (Shoot 'em Down)" the 15th best metal song of 2023.

Catherine Morris of Metal Hammer called Judgement Day a relentlessly fast-paced ode to the likes of Helloween and Stratovarius. She cited "Stand and Deliver (Shoot 'em Down)" as a standout track that evokes Girlschool and Warlock. Describing the album as timeless in many ways, Morris wrote that what is most interesting about Lovebites is how the young band all but reject modernity in order to replicate the sound of NWOBHM and power metal, but "Now that they've mastered the power metal formula, some divergence from it would be welcome in future." Andy Thorley finished his 9 out of 10 review for Maximum Volume Music with, "There will not be a better record of this type in 2023. [...] Lovebites are the Queens of Power Metal at this point. Consider this your proof."

Dom Lawson of Blabbermouth.net gave Judgement Day an 8 out of 10 rating, writing that Lovebites "adhere to a more-is-more ethos, wherein speed, power and a never-ending stream of wild, technical solos are the keys to the kingdom. With vocalist Asami scaling the octaves like some possessed Broadway star, every one of these songs is a full-on, no-holds-barred heavy metal rager". With "turbocharged thrash", he suggested the grandiose and symphonic "Dissonance" might be the best song the band have ever recorded, and said songs such as "The Spirit Lives On" and "Soldier Stands Solitarily" show they have "true metal grit". Lawson's sole complaint was that, with every song clocking in at around six-minutes and with no respite, the album ends up a slightly exhausting experience.

In an 8/10 review for Distorted Sound, Sam Khaneka wrote that while it is not very different from Lovebites' previous material stylistically speaking, they are tapping in to a more ferocious tone on the album. He found this most-evident in the title track, where "battering ram guitar riffs, histrionic stabs of strings and looming background choirs" evoke a "classical nightmare". Khaneka described the Baroque-infused synths on "The Spirit Lives On" as providing a counterpoint to the song's remorselessly fast rhythms while paving the way for some impressive vocal gymnastics in the chorus, and "My Orion" as the album's most direct track that leans more towards late 1980s pop metal. Contrary to Lawson, he found "Dissonance" somewhat underwhelming for lacking the band's typical melodic hook to "really bring it home". Khaneka wrote that the biggest criticism one could levy at Judgement Day is that it is everything you expect from the band, with little growth.

== Track listing ==
All lyrics are written by Asami.

Judgement Day track listing
No.	Title	Music	Arrangement	Length
1.	"We Are the Resurrection"	Midori, Asami, Mao	Mao, Lovebites	4:56
2.	"Judgement Day"	Asami, Mao	Mao, Lovebites	5:52
3.	"The Spirit Lives On"	Mao	Mao, Lovebites	5:32
4.	"Wicked Witch"	Miyako	Miyako, Lovebites	5:34
5.	"Stand and Deliver (Shoot 'em Down)"	Miyako, Asami	Miyako, Lovebites	5:09
6.	"Victim of Time"	Mao	Mao, Lovebites	5:22
7.	"My Orion"	Mao	Mao, Lovebites	4:34
8.	"Lost in the Garden"	Miyako	Miyako, Lovebites	6:07
9.	"Dissonance"	Asami, Mao	Mao, Lovebites	4:57
10.	"Soldier Stands Solitarily"	Miyako	Miyako, Lovebites	5:21
Total length:				53:29

Limited Edition A and B DVD or Blu-ray
No.	Title	Length
1.	"Bassist Audition Documentary"	35:55
2.	"The Hammer of Wrath"	4:54
3.	"Golden Destination"	6:11
4.	"Shadowmaker"	6:02
5.	"Bravehearted"	6:27
Total length:		69:00

== Personnel ==
Lovebites

- Asami – vocals, gang vocals on track 5
- Midori – guitars, gang vocals on track 5
- Miyako – guitars and keyboards, gang vocals on track 5
- Fami – bass, gang vocals on track 5
- Haruna – drums, gang vocals on track 5

Other

- Mao – keyboards and programming
- Steve Jacobs – production
- Mikko Karmila – mixing
- Mika Jussila – mastering

== Charts ==
Chart performance of Judgement Day
Chart (2023)	Peak position
Japanese Albums (Oricon)	5
Japanese Combined Albums (Oricon)	6
Japanese Hot Albums (Billboard Japan)	5
