= Clockwork Immortality =

2018 studio album by Lovebites

Studio album by Lovebites
- Released: December 5, 2018
- Studios: Studio Move 705; CPR Studio; MIT Studio; DSW Studio; Miyako Studio
- Genre: Power metal
- Length: 53:26
- Label: Victor
- Producer: Steve Jacobs

Lovebites chronology
Battle Against Damnation (2018)	Clockwork Immortality (2018)	Electric Pentagram (2020)

Clockwork Immortality is the second studio album by Japanese power metal band Lovebites. The album was released in Japan on December 5, 2018, by Victor Entertainment, and in Europe, Australia, and New Zealand two days later by Arising Empire. JPU Records released it in the United Kingdom on January 18, 2019. It reached number 21 on the Oricon chart and number 23 on Billboard Japan.

== Background ==
Lovebites started recording Clockwork Immortality before the June 6, 2018 release of their second EP, Battle Against Damnation. Several of the songs began during the making of the EP. The band created a list of what "qualities" they wanted to include on the album before Miho, Miyako, and Asami started writing in their own teams with their frequent collaborator, Light Bringer keyboardist Mao. Miyako recorded all of her guitar parts at her home studio using a Dean USA Icon guitar before re-amping, using a Peavey 6505 for the lead and solos and a Marshall for backing.

Bassist and bandleader Miho described Clockwork Immortality as featuring "the strongest, most powerful elements" of Battle Against Damnation, with the "speedy and melodic elements" of their first album, Awakening from Abyss. Guitarist Midori described it as still rooted in power metal and featuring "notable influences from thrash metal and speed metal." But she noted that they did experiment with acoustic guitars and adopted a different approach to some songs in order to add a "little variation" to their sound in addition to including their first ballad.

Like all of their releases, it was mixed by Mikko Karmila and mastered by Mika Jussila at Finnvox Studios in Helsinki, Finland. Also returning, The EasyRabbit CreArtions provided the cover art of a wolf smashing through an hourglass; illustrated by Spanish artist David López Gómez and designed by Gómez and Carlos Vincente León. The wolf, which also appeared on the band's previous two releases, symbolizes that by playing the non-mainstream genre of heavy metal Lovebites are a "lone wolf" in the music scene. Midori described the art as visualizing the meaning of the album title; "treasure every moment of your time."

== Themes ==
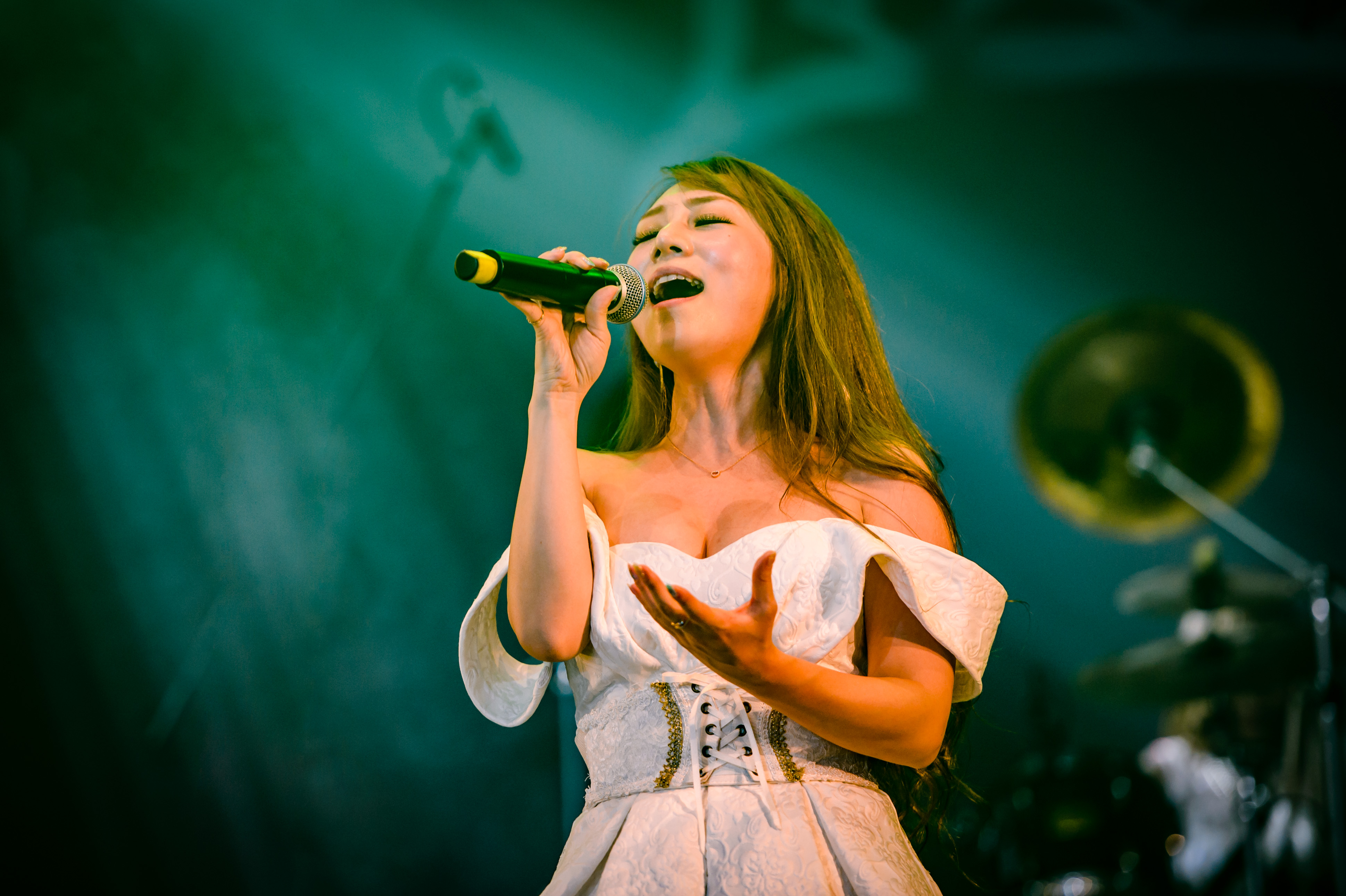
With this second album, Asami said that she has gotten used to writing English lyrics.

Miho described the opening riff of "Pledge of the Saviour" as a good mixture between melodic power metal and the musicality from Midori and Miyako's metalcore backgrounds.

For the piano and vocal part in the middle of "Rising", Miyako wanted to pay respect to Chopin.

The slightly progressive metal track "Empty Daydream" was originally made for Battle Against Damnation, but did not pass the EP's final song selection and was instead kept for the album.

"Mastermind 01" was the last song that Miyako wrote for the album and Miho compared it to "Scream for Me" off of Awakening from Abyss. Asami's fast vocal delivery slightly reminded both of them of rap music.

"M.D.O." was made specifically so an audience could sing along live. Its title stands for "Most Destructive Outset" and its lyrical theme was inspired by the Resurrection arc of the manga series Phoenix by Osamu Tezuka.

Miho wrote the lyrics to "Journey to the Otherside" about her family, while those of "The Final Collision" seek to inspire from a personal suffering she was going through at the time. The bassist also said that with "Journey to the Otherside" she was partially able to create a chorus that could be sung in unison with a live audience, inspired by an experience she had playing Grim Reaper's "See You in Hell" at an event she was disc jockeying for.

The final ballad track "Epilogue" is the first metal song Asami has ever written. Miyako admitted that despite its few notes, it was the song that took the most takes to record her guitars for as the slightest mistake was noticeable. Its outro subtly includes the theme from the opening track, "Addicted".

== Release ==
Clockwork Immortality was released in Japan on December 5, 2018, by Victor Entertainment. Limited editions of the album include either a DVD or Blu-ray of the concert video Battle in the East, which was recorded on June 28, 2018, at Tsutaya O-East. The album was supported by the six-date Clockwork Immortality Tour in Japan 2019, from January 12 to February 23. Victor released a limited edition 2-disc vinyl LP record version of the album, titled Yūkyū no Haguruma (悠久の歯車, "Eternal Gear") in Japanese, on November 6, 2019, with new liner notes by Masanori Ito.

Lovebites' performance at Germany's Wacken Open Air in August 2018 earned them a contract with Arising Empire. The label released the album in Europe, Australia, and New Zealand two days after its Japanese release. While JPU Records released it in the United Kingdom on January 18, 2019.

== Reception ==
Professional ratings
Review scores
Source	Rating
Dead Rhetoric	9/10
Distorted Sound	7/10
Hardwired	3.5/5 stars
Hysteria	7/10
Infrared	9/10 stars
Maximum Volume Music	9.5/10
Metal Hammer	4/5 stars
TuttoRock	8/10 stars

Clockwork Immortality reached number 21 on the Oricon Albums Chart and stayed on the chart for six weeks. It peaked at number 23 on Billboard Japan's Hot Albums chart. However, it reached number 21 on Billboard Japan's Top Albums Sales chart, which is based only on physical sales.

Giving the album a near perfect 9.5/10, Andy Thorley of Maximum Volume Music believes it proves Lovebites are one of the finest metal bands around and suggested that Clockwork Immortality might be the greatest metal album ever recorded by an all-woman group.

Dead Rhetoric's Matt Coe wrote that the album reminds him of the best of Visions-era Stratovarius, Helloween's classic Keeper of the Seven Keys records, and "the magnificence of early Angra." He called Lovebites one of the strongest Japanese bands that "could seriously make a solid dent into international success based on their output."

Citing "Mastermind 01" and "Pledge of the Saviour" as highlights, Dannii Leivers of Metal Hammer claimed Clockwork Immortality is without a bad song as each "stands tall and defiant, brilliantly crafted and memorable in its own right." They finished by stating "Believe the hype, ladies and gentlemen. Lovebites are the full package."

Jovan Ristić of Hardwired wrote that "From the first notes of the opener "Addicted" down to the cheesy power ballad in "Epilogue", the album invokes the glory days of power metal, but with a fresh take." Feeling that all of the songs are recognizable and catchy, he cited "The Final Collision" and "Rising" as standouts showing the musicians' musical capabilities.

Calling the songs engaging, inventive and inspiring, Hysteria's Audrey Gerrard believes Clockwork Immortality represents another step closer towards Lovebites finding its unique blend of power metal "with a range of stylistic strengths at the core of the various tracks."

Ali Cooper of Distorted Sound gave the album a 7/10 and praised the skills of the guitarists and Asami's vocals, but felt several aspects were predictable and "cookie-cutting."

== Track listing ==
All lyrics are written by Asami, except tracks 6–8 by Miho.

Clockwork Immortality track listing
No.	Title	Music	Arrangement	Length
1.	"Addicted"	Miyako	Lovebites, Miyako	5:25
2.	"Pledge of the Saviour"	Miyako	Lovebites, Miyako	5:18
3.	"Rising"	Miyako	Lovebites, Miyako	5:45
4.	"Empty Daydream"	Miyako	Lovebites, Miyako	5:16
5.	"Mastermind 01"	Miyako	Lovebites, Miyako	4:19
6.	"M.D.O."	Miho, Mao	Lovebites, Mao	4:16
7.	"Journey to the Otherside"	Miho, Mao	Lovebites, Mao	4:46
8.	"The Final Collision"	Miho, Mao	Lovebites, Mao	5:45
9.	"We the United"	Mao	Lovebites, Mao	5:29
10.	"Epilogue"	Asami, Mao	Lovebites, Mao	7:07
Total length:				53:26

Limited edition DVD or Blu-ray: Battle in the East
No.	Title	Length
1.	"The Awakening"
2.	"The Crusade"
3.	"Warning Shot"
4.	"Break the Wall"
5.	"Scream for Me"
6.	"Shadowmaker"
7.	"Above the Black Sea"
8.	"Inspire"
9.	"The Apocalypse"
10.	"The Hammer of Wrath"
11.	"Liar"
12.	"Burden of Time"
13.	"Don't Bite the Dust"
14.	"Under the Red Sky"
15.	"Edge of the World"
16.	"Bravehearted"

== Personnel ==
Lovebites

- Haruna – drums
- Miho – bass guitar
- Midori – guitars
- Miyako – guitars, acoustic guitars and keyboards
- Asami – vocals

Other

- Mao – keyboards and programming
- Steve Jacobs – production
- Mikko Karmila – mixing
- Mika Jussila – mastering

== Charts ==
Chart performance of Clockwork Immortality
Chart (2018)	Peak position
Japan Hot Albums (Billboard)	23
Japanese Albums (Oricon)	21
