= Golden Destination =

2020 song by Lovebites

Single by Lovebites

from the album Electric Pentagram
- Released: February 19, 2020
- Studio: Studio Move 705; CPR Studio; MIT Studio; DSW Studio; Miyako Studio; MTHK Studio
- Genre: Power metal
- Length: 6:03
- Label: Victor
- Composers: Miho, Mao
- Lyricist: Miho
- Producer: Steve Jacobs

Music video
- "Golden Destination" on YouTube

"Golden Destination" is the first single by Japanese power metal band Lovebites. Taken from their third studio album, Electric Pentagram, it was released in Japan by Victor Entertainment on February 19, 2020 and internationally by JPU Records on April 10. The song reached number 20 on the Oricon Singles Chart and number 22 on Billboard Japan's Top Singles chart.

== Overview ==
Decibel magazine reported that bassist Miho wrote "Golden Destination" to honor British metal. She compared it to "Don't Bite the Dust", from the band's debut EP and first album, stating that this is how the older song would probably sound if she had written it today. The single includes three other songs, including an orchestral version of "Thunder Vengeance" from Electric Pentagram.

Like all of the band's releases, it was mixed by Mikko Karmila and mastered by Mika Jussila at Finnvox Studios in Helsinki, Finland. Also returning for the cover art was The EasyRabbit CreArtions, a duo of Spanish artists David López Gómez and Carlos Vincente León.

The music video for "Golden Destination" follows Lovebites touring the United Kingdom in November 2019 as a support act for DragonForce.

== Release ==
"Golden Destination" was only released on physical formats. First released on CD by Victor Entertainment on February 19, 2020, a limited edition was created that includes a pendant necklace featuring a pentagram. Victor then released a limited edition 12" vinyl record version of the single, titled Ōgon o Motomete (黄金を求めて, "Golden Desire") in Japanese, on December 25, 2020 with new liner notes by Masanori Ito.

Internationally, JPU Records released the single on April 10, 2020 on CD and 12" vinyl.

== Reception ==
Blabbermouth.net's Dom Lawson described "Golden Destination" as Helloween on steroids, "with some of the most blistering lead work you'll hear in 2020 and a delicious AOR sheen."

James Weaver of Distorted Sound called the song an "absolute romp" thanks to its twin guitar harmonies, "breathtaking leadwork" and NWOBHM-inspired structure. Kerrang!'s Olly Thomas described the guitar riffs as Iron Maiden-esque.

== Track listing ==
No.	Title	Lyrics	Music	Arrangement	Length
1.	"Golden Destination"	Miho	Miho, Mao	Lovebites, Mao	6:03
2.	"Spellbound"	Asami	Mao	Lovebites, Mao	4:59
3.	"Puppet on Strings"	Asami	Miyako	Lovebites, Miyako	4:37
4.	"Thunder Vengeance (Orchestral Version)"	Miho	Miho, Mao	Lovebites, Mao	6:52
Total length:					22:37

== Personnel ==
Lovebites

- Haruna – drums
- Miho – bass
- Midori – guitars
- Miyako – guitars and keyboards
- Asami – vocals

Other

- Mao – keyboards and programming
- Steve Jacobs – production
- Mikko Karmila – mixing
- Mika Jussila – mastering

== Charts ==
Chart (2020)	Peak position
Japan Top Singles Chart (Billboard)	22
Japan Singles Chart (Oricon)	20
