= Electric Pentagram =

2020 studio album by Lovebites

Studio album by Lovebites
- Released: January 29, 2020
- Studios: Studio Move 705; CPR Studio; MIT Studio; DSW Studio; Miyako Studio; MTHK Studio
- Genre: Power metal
- Length: 70:42
- Label: Victor
- Producer: Steve Jacobs

Lovebites chronology
Clockwork Immortality (2018)	Electric Pentagram (2020)	Glory, Glory, to the World (2021)

Singles from Electric Pentagram
- 1. "Golden Destination" Released: February 19, 2020

Electric Pentagram is the third studio album by Japanese power metal band Lovebites. The album was released in Japan on January 29, 2020 by Victor Entertainment, and in the United Kingdom two days later by JPU Records. Red River Entertainment released it in North America on April 24, 2020. It reached number 9 on the Oricon chart and number 12 on Billboard Japan.

== Background ==
Lovebites were very busy in the first half of 2019; the Japanese tour for their second album Clockwork Immortality (2018) started in January, they opened for Arch Enemy in China in March, and in June performed at Download Festival in both the UK and Spain and at Graspop Metal Meeting in Belgium. Pre-production for their third album began during the tour for Clockwork Immortality. Guitarist and keyboardist Miyako said she wrote songs from the end of 2018 to March 2019, worked on arranging them from March to May, and began recording the drums in June 2019. As usual, she started writing before the rest of the band and as a result composed the music for half of the songs on the album. The music for the remaining songs was composed by other members with their frequent collaborator, Light Bringer keyboardist Mao. During their overseas performances, bassist Miho and vocalist Asami stayed in the hotel rooms to write lyrics.

For recording, Miyako mainly used a Dean USA Icon guitar and a Peavey amplifier. Midori mainly uses ESP E-II Horizon guitars and a Kemper Power Rack. The latter allows her to reproduce any amplifier sound she wants at any recording studio with a Kemper by simply bringing a USB with it preset. This album marks the first time Midori used eight-finger tapping on record.

The album title Electric Pentagram is meant to mean that Lovebites are "protecting heavy metal," as pentagrams are associated with amulets used for protection, and the five points of the pentagram represent the five members of the band. Miyako added that before the album was released people were asking if it was going to be pop due to the band's increasing popularity, so the title is meant to assure metal fans. Like all of their releases, it was mixed by Mikko Karmila and mastered by Mika Jussila at Finnvox Studios in Helsinki, Finland. Also returning, The EasyRabbit CreArtions, a duo of Spanish artists David López Gómez and Carlos Vincente León, provided the cover art of a wolf and a pentagram. The wolf, which appears on all but the band's debut release, symbolizes that by playing the non-mainstream genre of heavy metal Lovebites are a "lone wolf" in the music scene.

== Themes ==
Miho composed "Thunder Vengeance" around early spring 2019, coming up with the riff after watching Slayer at Download Festival Japan on March 21.

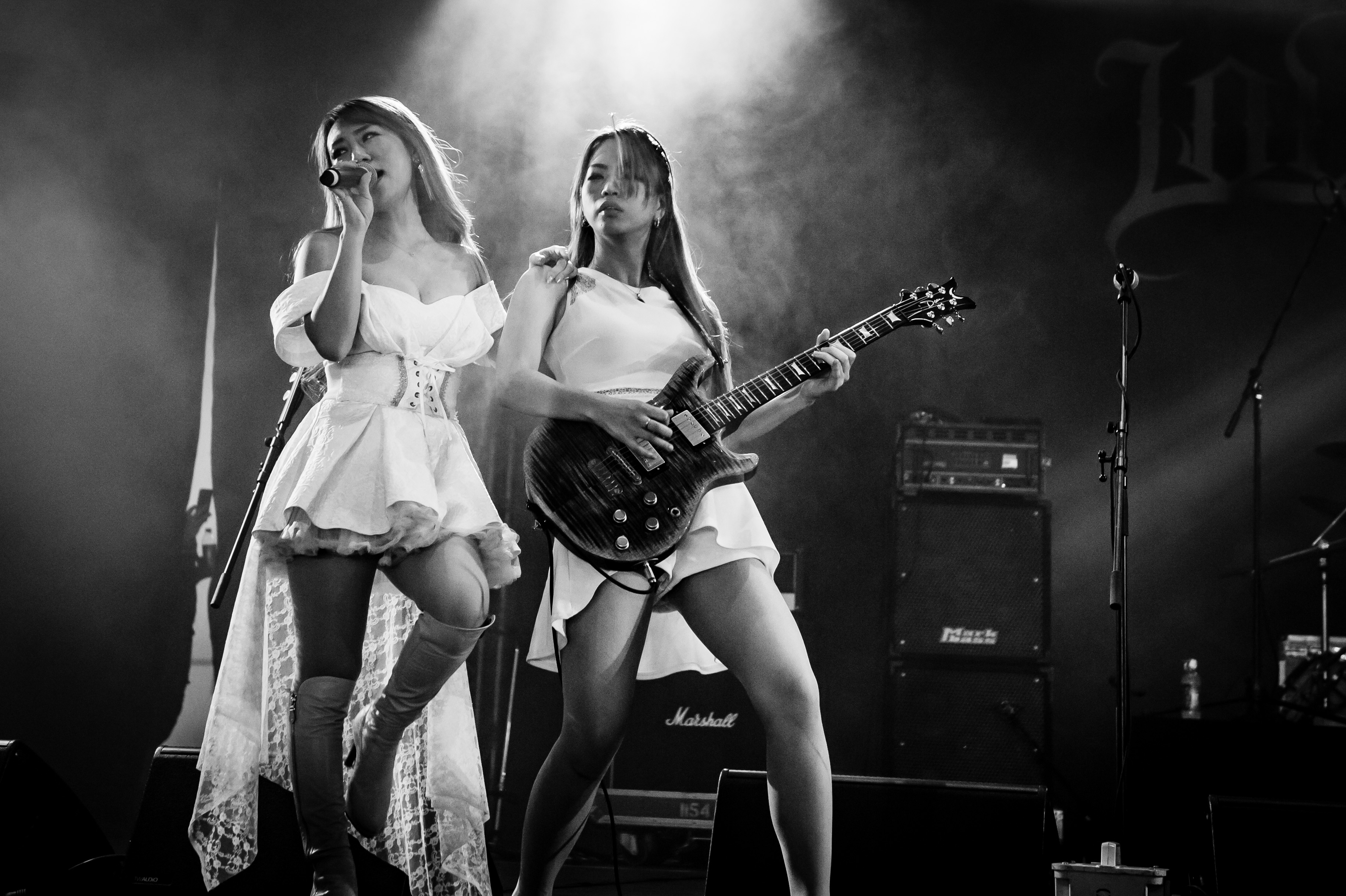
Asami (left) wrote most of the lyrics for the album, while Miyako (right) composed the music for half of its songs.

The music and initial arrangement for "Holy War" were created by Mao, before the band made quite a few changes to the latter during recording. For the first time, the lyrics are credited to Lovebites as a whole, as all five members threw in ideas. Midori said the song was inspired by Angra, with her guitar solo especially influenced by their former guitarist Kiko Loureiro.

Decibel magazine reported that Miho wrote "Golden Destination" to honor British metal. The bassist herself compared it to "Don't Bite the Dust", from both their debut EP and first album, stating that this is how the older song would probably sound if she had written it today.

Miyako speculated that "Raise Some Hell" was inspired by hanging around Halestorm. Because Lovebites' lyrics are typically serious, Asami said that for "Raise Some Hell" she wanted to make a silly song for their audiences. She also described the music as closer to hard rock.

After composing "When Destinies Align", Miyako gave it the temporary title "Lovebites". She had been saving that honor since 2017 for use when she wrote a song "divine" enough to bear the band's name. The guitarist described the track as melodic speed metal. Recognizing the song as representative of the band, Asami wrote the lyrics about its five members.

Although Asami typically comes up with the melody of a song before Mao provides an arrangement, for "A Frozen Serenade" the arrangement was solidified first. Since Electric Pentagram was coming out in the winter, the singer wanted a sad winter ballad. Asami knew she wanted to include acoustic guitar on the track. Despite stating that acoustic guitar is more difficult than electric, since the slightest mistake will be heard, Miyako said she was able to record the solos quickly.

"Dancing with the Devil" marks guitarist Midori's first songwriting credits with the band, as she co-wrote the lyrics with Asami and the music with Mao. She listened to the demo provided by Mao only once, then came up with the rest based on the phrases that remained in her head. It was actually written for the previous album, but did not fit. This time she reworked the riffs and guitar arrangements. She noted that the BPM is slow for a Lovebites song, and said it is meant to be heavy and groovy. Although, Asami felt it also has R&B elements.

The demo of "Signs of Deliverance" dates to January or February 2018, and Lovebites have been playing it live since July 2019, when it was still untitled. Miyako said that she wanted a song where she and Midori would be tapping together in the center of the stage.

Miyako described "Set the World on Fire" as thrash metal. The album's producer had them change the middle's arrangement just before recording.

Miho described "The Unbroken" as a shuffle beat song and the most difficult song on the album, having been hard to arrange and record.

For "Swan Song", Miyako combined elements of her favorite classics; Frédéric Chopin's "Revolutionary Étude" and Antonín Dvořák's "New World Symphony". Asami writes lyrics after the music is composed, and writes them to match the mood of the song. Having performed classical ballet, the piano and classical motif on the track made her think of Swan Lake. When the idea of having a "singalong" was brought up, Asami added an opera-like backing chorus towards the end. She also stated that the final piano part represents the swan dying.

== Release ==
Electric Pentagram was released in Japan on January 29, 2020, by Victor Entertainment. Limited Edition A includes a DVD of their performance at Wacken Open Air in Germany on August 4, 2018. Limited Edition B includes a 2-CD live album recorded at EX Theater Roppongi on July 12, 2019. It was to be supported by a seven-date Japanese tour scheduled from February 14 to April 12, 2020. In celebration of the album, a pop-up shop was opened at Shinuku Marui Annex from February 7–16 where merchandise from the upcoming tour was sold early and the band members' stage outfits were displayed. Due to the COVID-19 pandemic in Japan, refunds were offered for people who did not want to attend the February 27 Osaka tour date, and the March 7 Sendai, March 21 Nagoya, and April 12 Sapporo performances were postponed until June 6, June 8, and June 1 respectively. As consolation for the three postponements, Lovebites streamed their concert videos for free on YouTube; Daughters of the Dawn - Live in Tokyo on March 7, Battle in the East on March 21, and Crusaders Standing at Wacken - Live in Germany 2018 on April 12. Victor released a limited edition 2-disc vinyl LP record version of the album, titled Dengeki Shinwa (電撃神話, "Electric Shock Myth") in Japanese, on December 25, 2020 with new liner notes by Masanori Ito.

"Golden Destination" was released as the band's first single on February 19, 2020. In addition to the title track, the CD-only single includes three songs not featured on Electric Pentagram; "Spellbound" written by Asami and composed by Mao, "Puppet on Strings" written by Asami and composed by Miyako, and an orchestral version of "Thunder Vengeance". A limited edition included a pendant necklace featuring a pentagram. Victor released a limited edition 12" vinyl record version of the single, titled Ōgon o Motomete (黄金を求めて, "Golden Desire") in Japanese, on December 25, 2020 with new liner notes by Masanori Ito.

JPU Records released the album in the United Kingdom on January 31, 2020, and released the "Golden Destination" single on April 10, 2020, on CD and 12" vinyl. Electric Pentagram was released in North America on April 24, 2020, by Red River Entertainment/BFD, with distribution by The Orchard.

== Reception ==
Professional ratings
Review scores
Source	Rating
Blabbermouth.net	8.5/10
Bring the Noise UK	8/10
Distorted Sound	7/10
Kerrang!	3/5 stars
TuttoRock	8/10 stars

Electric Pentagram reached number 9 on the Oricon Albums Chart and stayed on the chart for eight weeks. It peaked at number 12 on Billboard Japan's Hot Albums chart. It also reached number 12 on Billboard Japan's Top Albums Sales chart, which is based only on physical sales. In April 2020, Metal Hammer listed Electric Pentagram as one of the 20 Best Metal Albums of 2020 (So Far). Loudwire included "Signs of Deliverance" on a list of the 66 Best Metal Songs of 2020.

In a review for Blabbermouth.net, Dom Lawson stated that Lovebites consistently "nail the strongest and grittiest aspects" of traditional and power metal and seem to be incapable of writing a bad song. He described "Golden Destination" as Helloween on steroids, "with some of the most blistering lead work you'll hear in 2020 and a delicious AOR sheen" and "A Frozen Serenade" as both the band's most epic moment to date and a change of pace where Asami shines. Lawson said that if there is any criticism to state, it is that the album is one or two songs too long.

Writing for Bring the Noise UK, Rosie Esther Solomon called "Thunder Vengeance" an instant power metal classic and "A Frozen Serenade" undeniably the album's best song that shows the band's versatility and range. Solomon also noted "The Unbroken" and its "swung rhythm, which shouldn't really work with this type of metal but it really does." She concluded by stating Lovebites both pays respect to power metal while at the same time totally turning the genre on its head, and called the album essential listening by a band who are "truly earning their place in amongst metal royalty."

James Weaver of Distorted Sound called "Golden Destination" an "absolute romp" thanks to its twin guitars, "breathtaking leadwork" and NWOBHM-inspired structure, "Raise Some Hell" an "absolute rager as the thrashing riffs compliment Asami's incredibly powerful vocal deliverie" and "When Destinies Align" a bonafide anthem. He went on to strongly praise Asami's vocals. Noting their prolific pace of releasing material, Weaver expressed concern that Lovebites might run out of steam and also said that the album's long length means the latter songs do not connect as well as they should, despite retaining the same solid quality as the openers. He finished his review stating "Whilst it may be slightly predictable in places, this new offering from Japan's rising stars is yet another strong addition to their ever-increasing arsenal."

Kerrang!'s Olly Thomas compared the "impeccable, near-thrash attack" of "Thunder Vengeance" to Judas Priest's "Painkiller" and described the guitar riffs in "Golden Destination" as Iron Maiden-esque. He said that while Electric Pentagram shows skilled musicianship and "well-executed metallic bravura," the slick production occasionally makes it feel synthetic. However, he explained that this is true of a lot of modern power metal and noted that Lovebites does have more memorable songs than most. Thomas ended by saying the album's "devotion to catchiness" renders it a "sustained blast of entertainment," despite its arguably over-generous length.

In a positive review for Tuonela Magazine, David Araneda called Electric Pentagram an important step forward for the young band who have the potential to become the "undisputed queens of power metal in the current decade." With it, he wrote, that they opted for a varied and "eclectic approach" to songwriting by taking many risks and adding unexpected aspects. Although, he too suggested it might be perfect if it had a couple less tracks, Araneda said that despite its little flaws the album is "consistent, refreshing and of top-notch quality."

== Track listing ==
Electric Pentagram track listing
No.	Title	Lyrics	Music	Arrangement	Length
1.	"Thunder Vengeance"	Miho	Miho, Mao	Mao, Lovebites	5:32
2.	"Holy War"	Lovebites	Mao	Mao, Lovebites	5:57
3.	"Golden Destination"	Miho	Miho, Mao	Mao, Lovebites	6:03
4.	"Raise Some Hell"	Asami	Miyako	Miyako, Lovebites	5:20
5.	"Today Is the Day"	Asami	Miyako	Miyako, Lovebites	5:51
6.	"When Destinies Align"	Asami	Miyako	Miyako, Lovebites	6:05
7.	"A Frozen Serenade"	Asami	Asami, Mao	Mao, Lovebites	6:47
8.	"Dancing with the Devil"	Asami, Midori	Midori, Mao	Mao, Lovebites	5:08
9.	"Signs of Deliverance"	Asami	Miyako	Miyako, Lovebites	5:09
10.	"Set the World on Fire"	Asami	Miyako	Miyako, Lovebites	5:46
11.	"The Unbroken"	Miho	Miho, Mao	Mao, Lovebites	6:30
12.	"Swan Song"	Asami	Miyako	Miyako, Lovebites	6:27
Total length:					70:42

Limited Edition A DVD: Crusaders Standing at Wacken - Live in Germany 2018
No.	Title	Length
1.	"The Awakening"	1:34
2.	"The Hammer of Wrath"	4:53
3.	"The Crusade"	4:49
4.	"Don't Bite the Dust"	5:31
5.	"Above the Black Sea"	5:08
6.	"Shadowmaker"	7:47
Total length:		29:42

Limited Edition B CD: Invitation to the Theater - Live in Tokyo 2019 Disc 1
No.	Title	Length
1.	"The Awakening"	2:09
2.	"The Apocalypse"	4:51
3.	"Don't Bite the Dust"	4:13
4.	"Rising"	6:35
5.	"Break the Wall"	5:25
6.	"Mastermind 01"	4:28
7.	"Inspire"	5:34
8.	"The Hammer of Wrath"	5:07
9.	"Keyboard Solo"	1:50
10.	"The Final Collision"	5:48

Limited Edition B CD: Invitation to the Theater - Live in Tokyo 2019 Disc 2
No.	Title	Length
1.	"Empty Daydream"	6:24
2.	"Signs of Deliverance"	5:06
3.	"M.D.O."	4:33
4.	"Liar"	6:54
5.	"Love Bites (So Do I)" (Halestorm cover)	3:07
6.	"Shadowmaker"	6:15
7.	"Bravehearted"	6:40
8.	"We the United"	6:03
9.	"Under the Red Sky"	7:16

== Personnel ==
Lovebites

- Haruna – drums
- Miho – bass guitar
- Midori – guitars
- Miyako – guitars, acoustic guitars and keyboards
- Asami – vocals

Other

- Mao – keyboards and programming
- Steve Jacobs – production
- Mikko Karmila – mixing
- Mika Jussila – mastering

== Charts ==
Chart performance of Electric Pentagram
Chart (2020)	Peak position
Japan Hot Albums (Billboard)	12
Japanese Albums (Oricon)	9
