= Lovebites (band) =

Japanese all-female power metal band

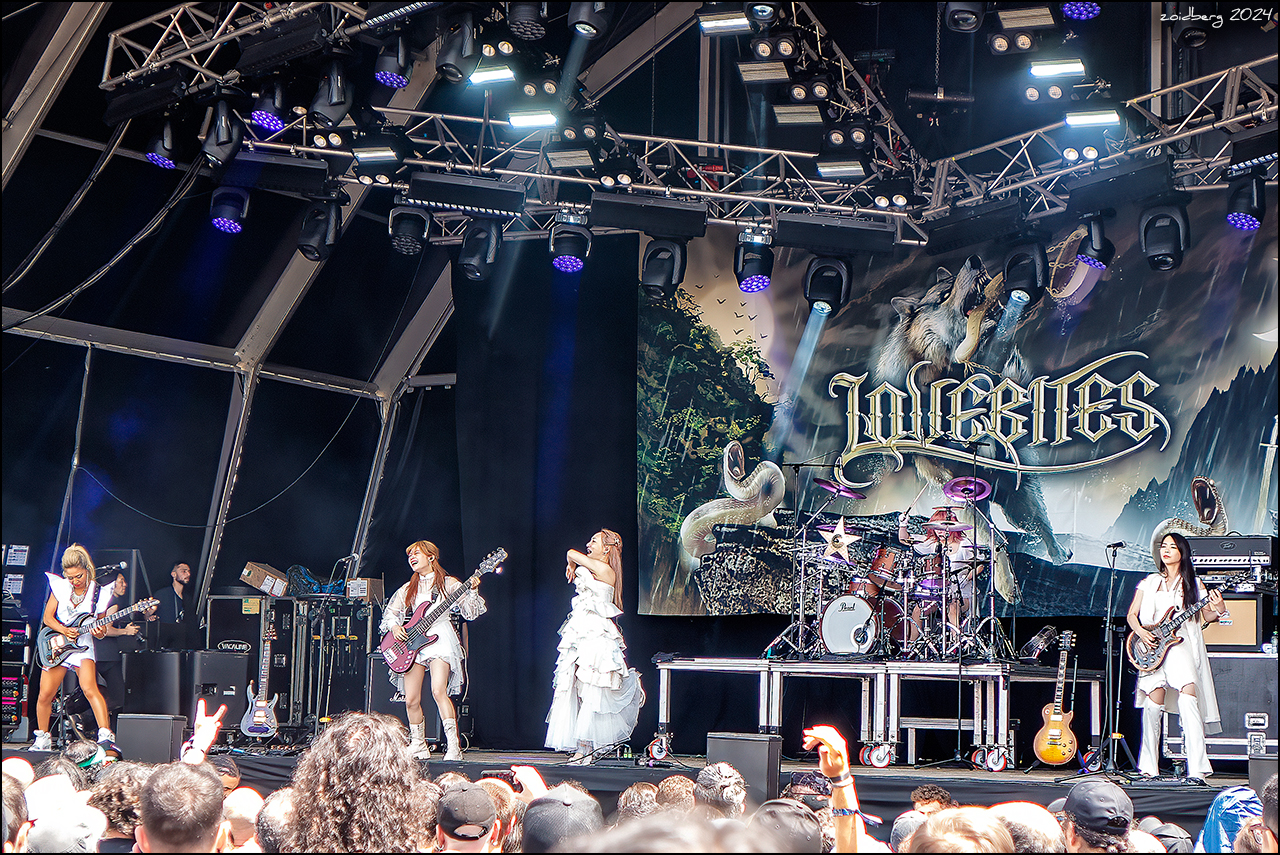
- Lovebites performing in 2024

Background information
- Origin: Tokyo, Japan
- Genres: Power metal; heavy metal
- Years active: 2016–present
- Labels: Victor; JPU; Sliptrick; Arising Empire; Red River; Napalm
- Members: Asami; Midori; Miyako; Haruna; Fami
- Past members: Miho
- Website: lovebites.jp

Lovebites (stylized as LOVEBITES) is a Japanese power metal band, formed in 2016 by former Destrose members Miho and Haruna. Its lineup currently consists of Asami on vocals, Midori and Miyako on guitars, Haruna on drums and Fami on bass. After signing to Victor Entertainment, the group released both their debut EP and their first album in 2017, The Lovebites EP and Awakening from Abyss, before performing their first overseas concerts at the end of the year. With another EP and album released in 2018, Battle Against Damnation and Clockwork Immortality, Lovebites quickly garnered international attention and won that year's Metal Hammer Golden Gods Award for Best New Band. Following the releases of Electric Pentagram (2020) and Glory, Glory, to the World (2021), bassist Miho left the band in August 2021. After a year-long hiatus, Lovebites recruited Fami on bass and released Judgement Day, their fourth album, in February 2023. It is their highest-charting record to date, reaching number 5 on both the Oricon and Billboard Japan charts.

== History ==
=== Formation and first album (2016–2017) ===
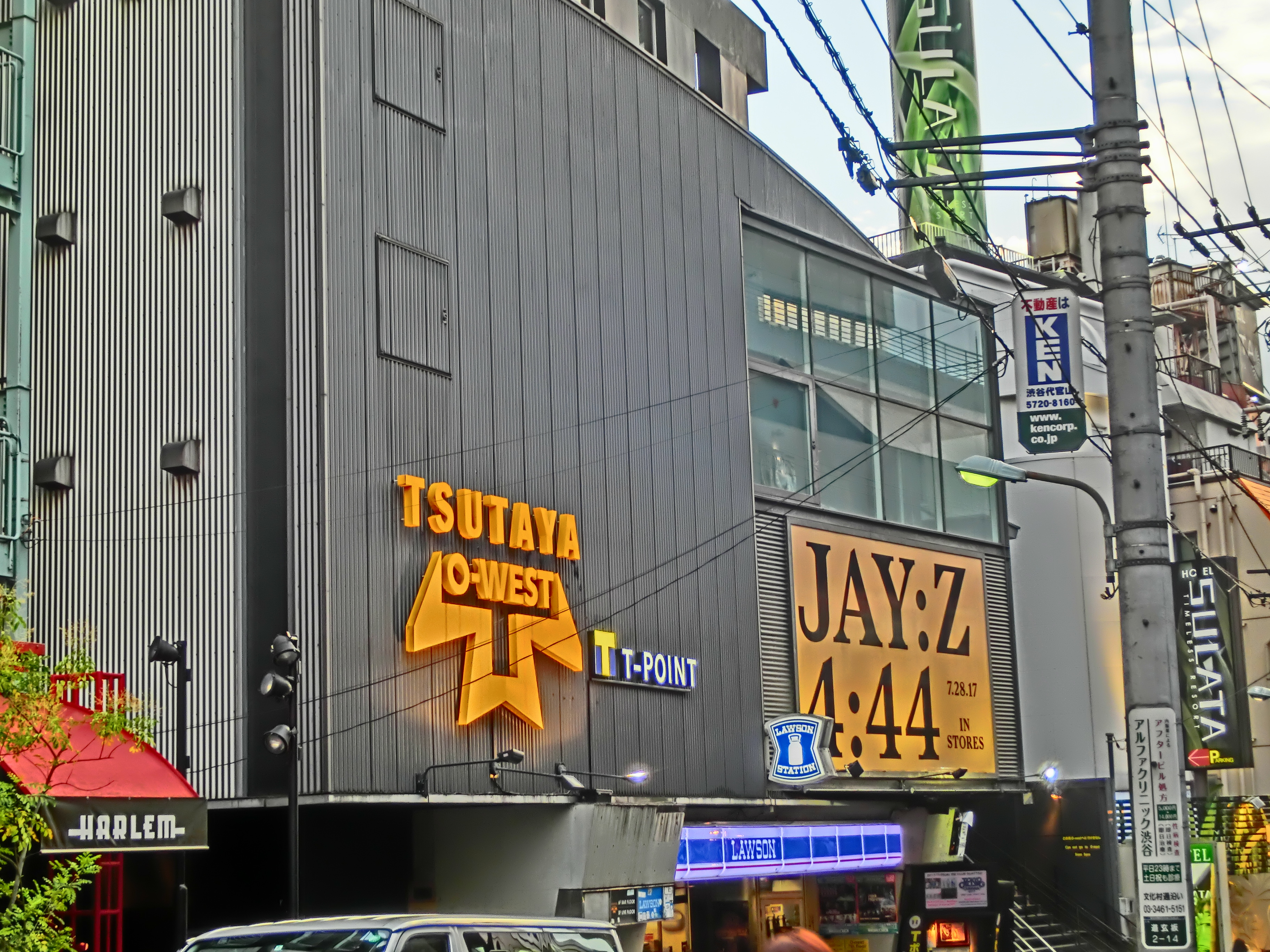
Lovebites played their first concert at Tsutaya O-West in November 2016.

Lovebites was formed in Tokyo in 2016 by bassist Miho and drummer Haruna. The two met while members of Destrose, another all-female metal band that disbanded in 2015. After recruiting guitarist Midori and support guitarist and keyboardist Miyako (then known as Mi-ya), the four chose vocalist Asami based on a demo she made. Midori was in the band Gekijo Metalicche, Miyako was a member of A Drop of Joker and 21g, while Asami was a backup singer for Vamps and Uverworld. During one rehearsal, the musicians performed "Love Bites (So Do I)" by Halestorm. Feeling that the song fit well with Asami's voice, it left an impression on all of the members and they chose Lovebites as the name for their new band. They had their first concert on November 18, 2016, at Tsutaya O-West as part of the Girls Band Next Generation event. For the show, they were supported by third guitarist Sena. They had previously performed a secret gig at Shibuya O-Crest on August 4, 2016, under the pseudonym "POWERSLAVES".

Lovebites released their debut EP, The Lovebites EP, in May 2017 via Victor Entertainment. Miho explained that it was more of a demo to get the band signed, but the label liked it so much they had it properly mastered and released. It was mixed by Mikko Karmila and mastered by Mika Jussila, who have worked with acts like Nightwish, Children of Bodom, and Stratovarius, at Finnvox Studios in Helsinki, Finland. The EP was released in the United Kingdom on August 25 by JPU Records and in North America by Sliptrick Records on August 31.

Support member Miyako became a full member of the band in August 2017. Their first full-length album Awakening from Abyss was released in Japan and North America on October 25, and in the UK two days later. It was again mixed and mastered by Karmila and Jussila and includes re-recordings of the four tracks from their debut EP. The album was supported by the sold out three-date Awakening from Abyss Tour 2017 from November 17 to December 7. In between, the group played their first gigs outside Japan: two nights at Hyper Japan Christmas and one show at Camden Underworld, both in London at the end of November 2017.

=== International recognition and Miho's departure (2018–2021) ===
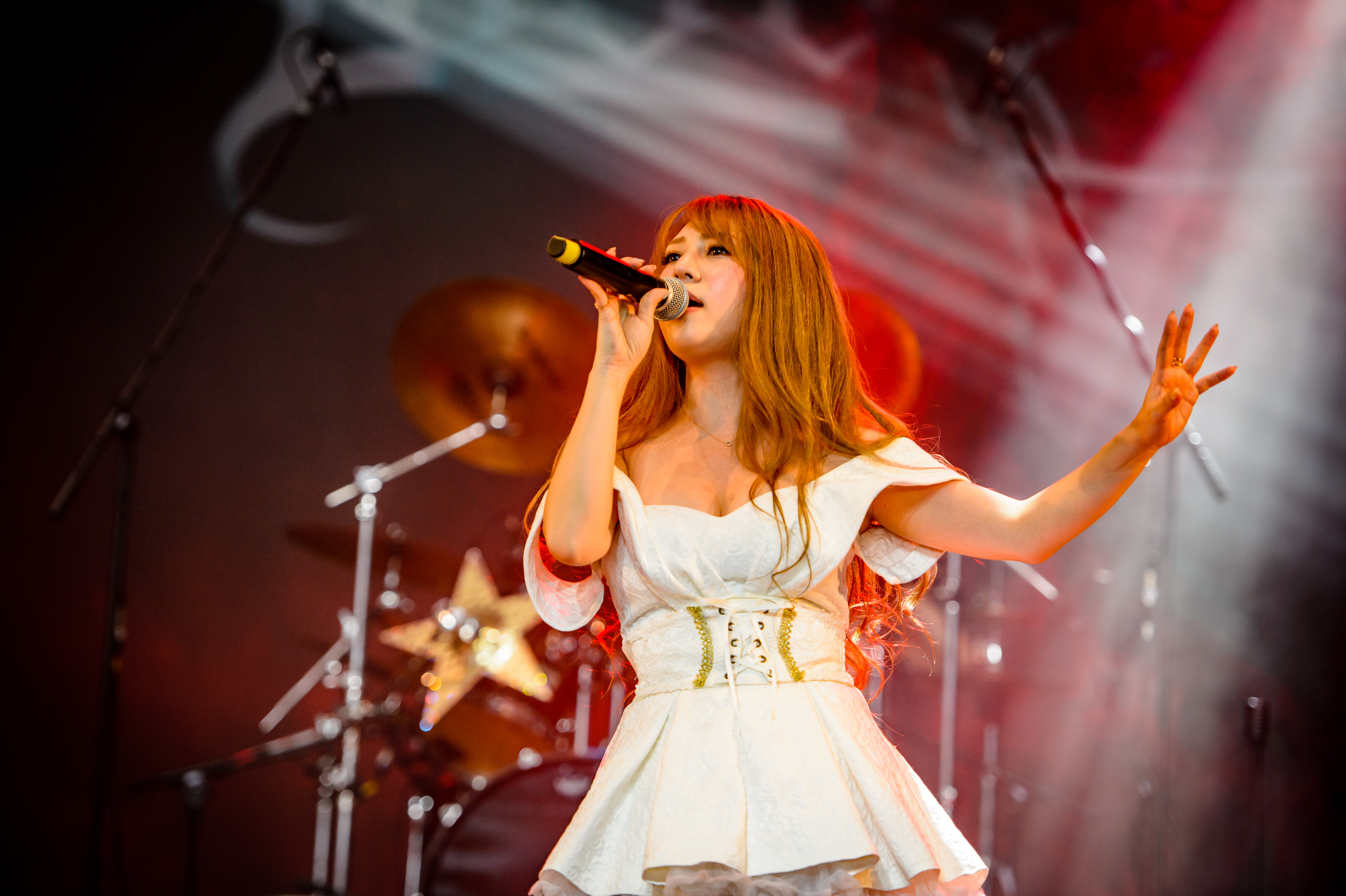
Vocalist Asami performing in Germany at Wacken Open Air 2018

On February 23, 2018, Lovebites played a concert titled Re-Awakening from Abyss at Duo Music Exchange. They then performed on the Japanese leg of Warped Tour on April 1 and released their second EP Battle Against Damnation on June 6. Days later, they won the 2018 Metal Hammer Golden Gods Award for Best New Band. They performed at Wacken Open Air on August 4, becoming the first Japanese all-female metal band to appear at the German festival. They also performed on the main stage at Bloodstock Open Air on August 10, 2018. In November, Lovebites held their first European tour that saw them visit the Netherlands, Germany, France and the UK. The band released their second album Clockwork Immortality on December 5 in Japan. Limited editions of the album include a DVD or Blu-ray of the concert video Battle in the East, which was recorded on June 28, 2018, at Tsutaya O-East. It was released in Europe, Australia, and New Zealand two days later by Arising Empire, and in the UK by JPU Records on January 18, 2019.

Lovebites was the opening act for Arch Enemy at two shows in Shanghai and Beijing, China on March 23 and 24, 2019. In June, they performed at the Download Festival in both Donington, UK and Madrid, Spain and at the Graspop Metal Meeting in Dessel, Belgium. Their set at Donington was cited by its organizers and Metal Hammer as one of the festival's highlight performances, including when Asami joined Halestorm on stage to sing her band's namesake song, which she had also done earlier at Download Festival Japan on March 21.

On July 10, Lovebites released their first standalone concert video and live album, Daughters of the Dawn – Live in Tokyo, recorded on January 27, 2019, at Mynavi Blitz Akasaka. The three-date Daughters of the Dawn Tour took place between July 12 and August 9. They were a support act on DragonForce's UK tour throughout the first half of November, and opened for Halestorm in Tokyo on December 2. The band's third studio album, Electric Pentagram, was released on January 29, 2020. It was set to be supported by a seven-date Japanese tour from February 14 to April 12, but the last three concerts were postponed until June due to the COVID-19 pandemic in Japan. On July 22, Lovebites released their second standalone concert video and live album, Five of a Kind – Live in Tokyo 2020, recorded on February 21, 2020, at Zepp DiverCity. To celebrate the third anniversary of Awakening from Abyss, the band streamed a live studio performance titled Awake Again, where they played the album in its entirety on October 25.

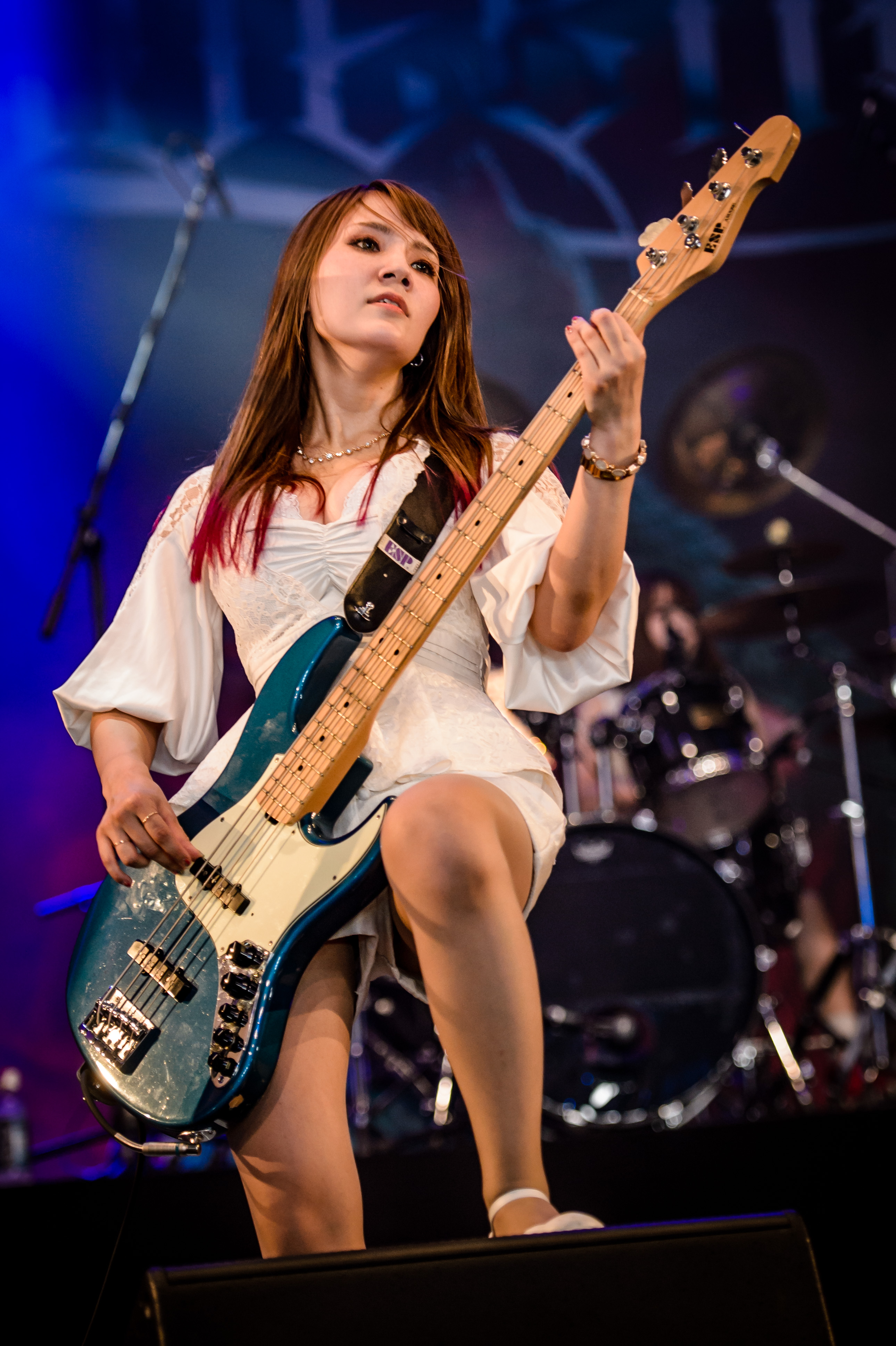
Bassist and co-founder Miho left the band in August 2021.

Lovebites wrote the song "Winds of Transylvania" to be used as the opening theme of the anime series Vlad Love and were named an official ambassador for the series. Its director, Mamoru Oshii, commented that "I could immediately see parallels between the five members and the main character of Vlad Love. They are like a heretic of heavy metal, wearing bright white outfits while playing intense music, they are the perfect choice to take charge of a theme song to an anime not bound by convention or common sense. And above all, their name couldn't be more fitting!" The band members appear in the anime's opening credits, which also features Vlad Love's fictional characters performing the song in a sequence that the animators based on the band's. A CD including "Winds of Transylvania" and the three other themes of the anime was released at Ichigo Animation's CulZone stores on January 9, 2021.

Lovebites released their third EP Glory, Glory, to the World, which they recorded during the COVID-19 pandemic, on March 10, 2021. The sold out national Ride for Vengeance Tour was originally set to take place between January 24 and March 5, but was rescheduled to between March 12 and April 6 following the Japanese government's declaration of a second state of emergency due to the pandemic and its extension. The March 26 performance at Tokyo Dome City Hall was filmed and recorded for release as the Heavy Metal Never Dies – Live in Tokyo 2021 concert video and live album on September 29, 2021.

On August 17, 2021, bassist Miho announced her departure from the band. The other members and their staff had held "countless meetings to find a way for her to stay," but ultimately decided to respect her decision. As a result, Lovebites temporarily suspended all activities, but assured fans that they would return. Between September 10–26, the band accepted votes via social media to help decide the tracklist of their first "best of" album. In the Beginning – The Best of 2017–2021 was released on December 22, 2021. The two-disc compilation features remastered versions of 21 songs, an additional disc containing all of their music videos, and the new track "Nameless Warrior", which was the last song recorded before Miho left the band.

=== Fami joins and first world tour (2022–present) ===
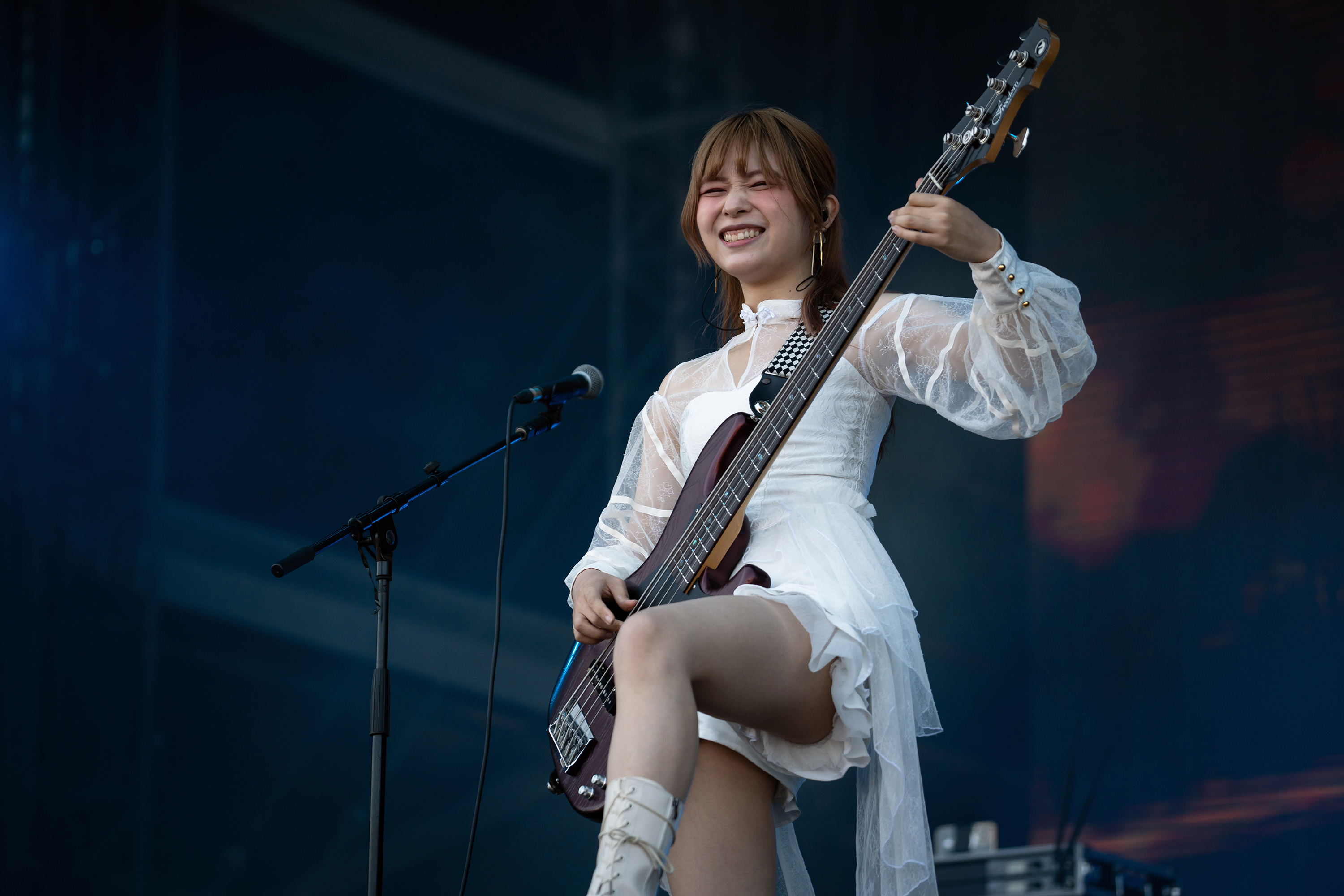
Fami joined Lovebites in October 2022

Between April 2 and May 24, 2022, Lovebites accepted auditions for a new bass player. Applicants had to create their own bassline to a track the band created for the occasion and submit a video of them performing it. On October 21, Lovebites revealed 20-year-old Fami as their new bassist via a full-band performance video on YouTube. An active musician since high school, Fami has produced her own solo album and has nearly 650,000 subscribers on her own YouTube channel. Lovebites released their fourth studio album, Judgement Day, on February 22, 2023. The limited editions of the album include footage of the bassist audition process, including the three songs Fami played with the band during the final selection. Their first concerts with the new lineup were held at Ex Theater Roppongi on March 11 and 12, while the tour for the album ran from August 26 to September 24 and ended with a finale titled The Last Judgement on October 5.

Lovebites held their first world tour, The Thin Line Between Love and Hate, between June 14 and September 12, 2024. It saw 17 performances in 16 cities and 10 countries, including four sold-out solo concerts in Europe and three in America. It included a South Korean date and an American leg, marking their first shows in both countries, and performances at the Rock Imperium Festival and Resurrection Fest in Spain, Hellfest in France, and the ProgPower USA festival in Atlanta, Georgia. The band's fourth EP, Lovebites EP II, was released during the tour on August 28, 2024. Lovebites then held the Eternal Phenomenon Tour throughout Japan from January 26 to March 13, 2025. It featured nine concerts, including visits to each member's hometown. In between dates of the tour, they had their first show in Mexico on March 1 as part of the Titans of Metal Fest. Lovebites held the US leg of the Eternal Phenomenon tour in nine locations in November.

The band released their fifth studio album, Outstanding Power, on February 18, 2026, and performed their first concert at the Nippon Budokan on March 29. The latter was completely sold out and saw Lovebites announce the Outstanding Tour, their largest Japanese tour to date, which will feature ten shows in nine cities from August 29 to September 26.

== Music and influences ==
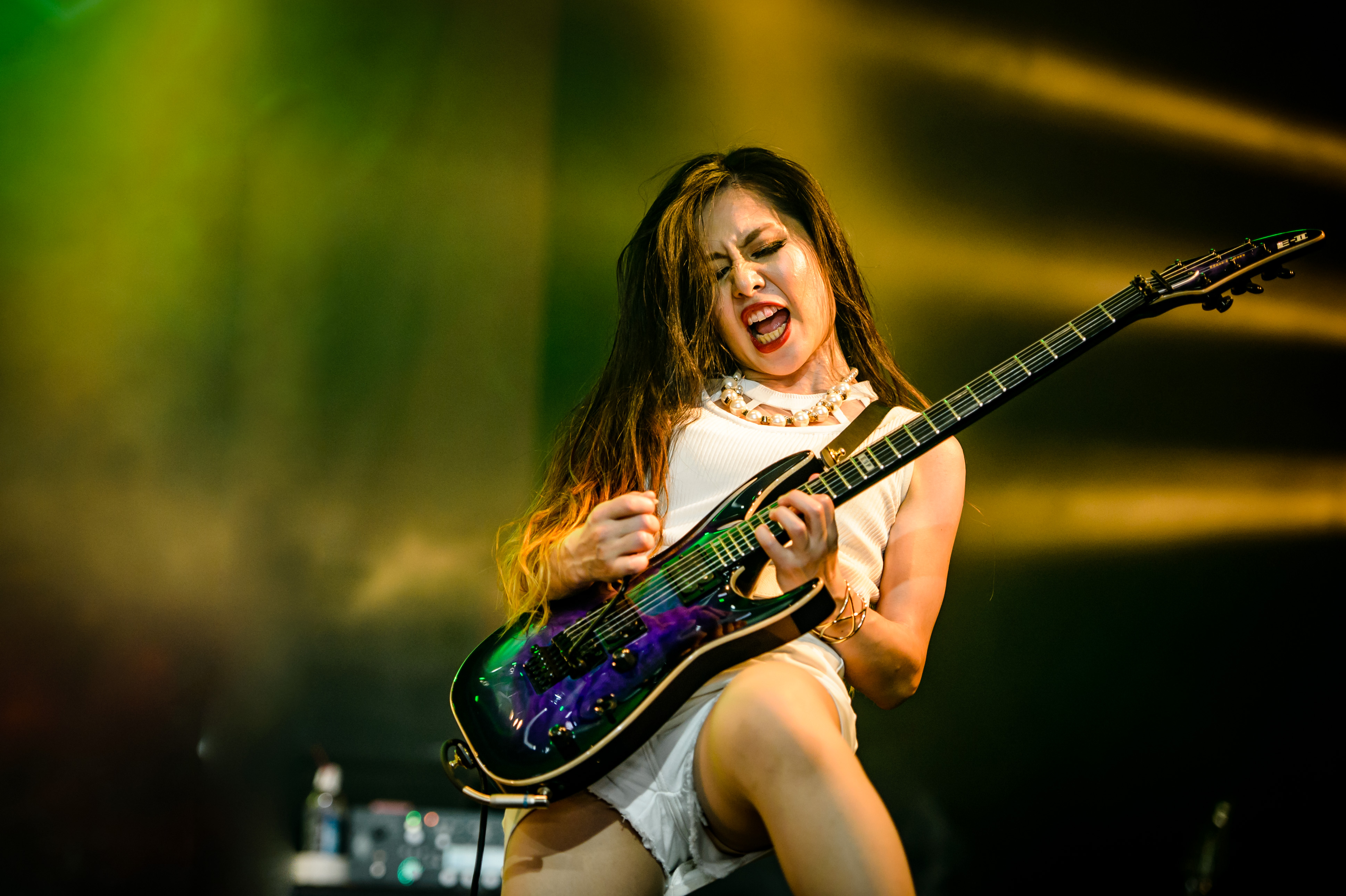
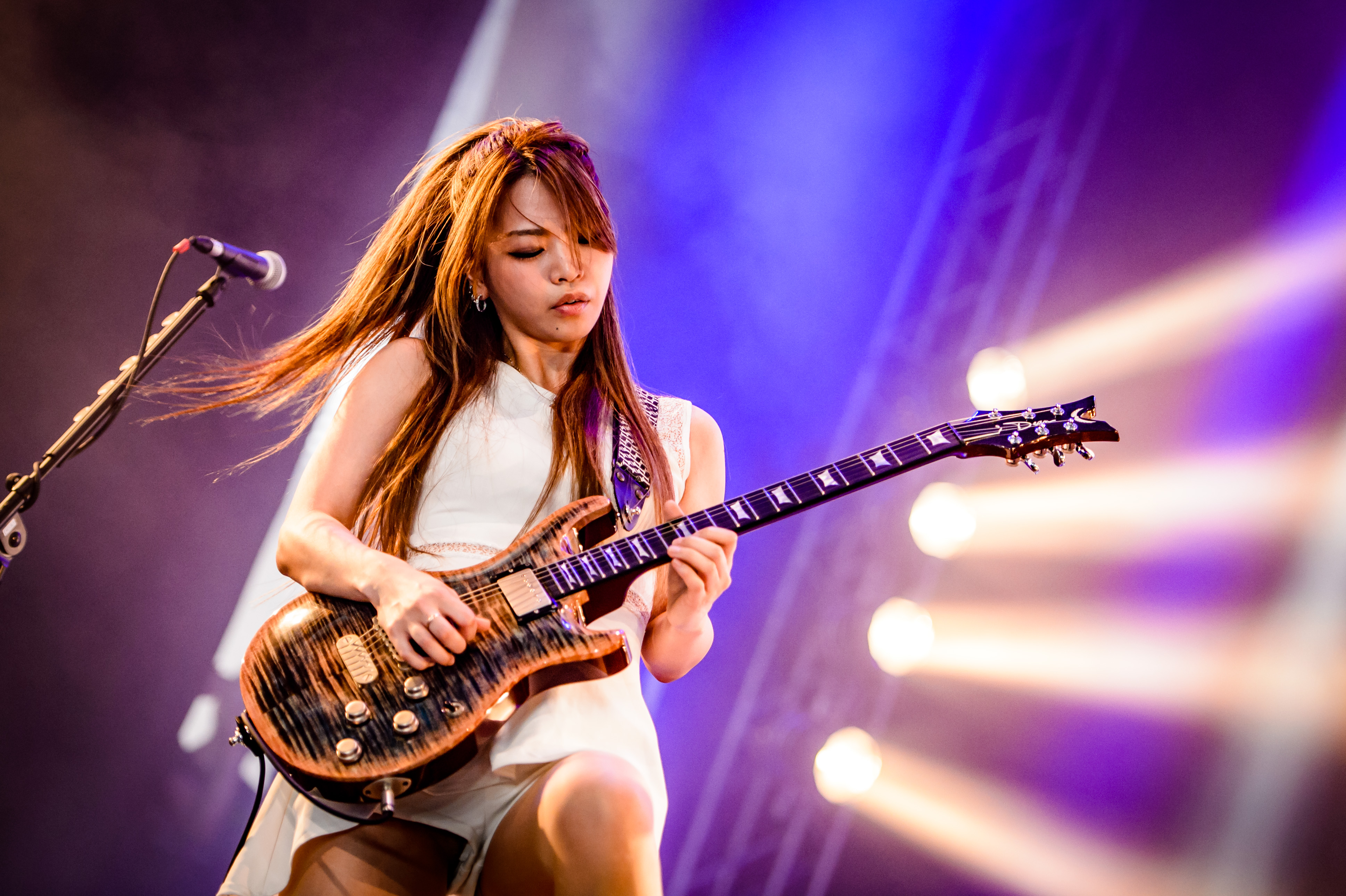
Guitarists Midori and Miyako performing at Wacken Open Air 2018

Although hailing from Tokyo, Lovebites' music is influenced by the new wave of British heavy metal, which led Sophie Maughan of Metal Hammer to compare their music to Iron Maiden and Rage. Miho said she always wanted to play a combination of power metal and "a little bit of old school [heavy metal]", as well as fast thrash metal. According to Asami, the thrash element is an indispensable part of the band's sound. Miho noted that their decision to wear all-white clothing, as opposed to the genre's stereotypical black, was made to contrast with their old school sound and have them stand out. Their lyrics are in English even though the musicians do not speak the language fluently. They are usually written in Japanese before being translated into English. An exception is the Haruna-penned song "Bravehearted" on their debut EP, which was intended for Destrose and sung in Japanese.

The group frequently collaborates with former Light Bringer keyboardist Mao on composing and arranging songs. All of their releases have been mixed and mastered by Finnish audio engineers Mikko Karmila and Mika Jussila, and all of their album cover illustrations since Awakening from Abyss have been created by Spanish artists David López Gómez and Carlos Vincente León. These album covers all feature a wolf to symbolize that, by playing the non-mainstream genre of heavy metal, Lovebites are a "lone wolf" in the music scene. The wolf is a mascot to represent the band, like Eddie for Iron Maiden or Vic Rattlehead for Megadeth.

Miho has been strongly into hard rock and heavy metal since junior high, and started playing bass in high school. Her favorite bands are Iron Maiden, Pantera, Mötley Crüe and Anthrax. She referred to her playing as more showmanship than technical, and cited Steve Harris as a strong influence alongside the style of Nikki Sixx.

Haruna has played drums since she was thirteen years old, and began writing songs on a keyboard at fourteen. From elementary school up to high school her favorite band was B'z, but she became interested in heavy metal after hearing Helloween's Master of the Rings. As a result, she stated her basic drumming style is that of Uli Kusch.

Midori started to learn piano at around two years of age and electric organ at eight, but gave up both upon entering university and started to learn guitar at 20. She is a graduate of Musicians Institute Japan in Osaka, and listed Kiko Loureiro, Nuno Bettencourt and Yngwie Malmsteen as her biggest guitar influences. Generally speaking, Midori said that she plays the "flashy and aggressive" guitar solos in the band, while Miyako plays the "slower, more melodic" ones.

Miyako has played classical piano since she was three and guitar since high school. Having grown up listening to classic rock bands like Deep Purple and Rainbow with her mother, Miyako ended up being very influenced by Ritchie Blackmore. But she has also been influenced by more modern guitarists, such as Timothy Henson and Scott LePage from Polyphia. It was Disarmonia Mundi's Ettore Rigotti who inspired Miyako to start composing and arranging songs.

Asami comes from a R&B and soul music background and likes artists such as Alicia Keys and Aretha Franklin. Starting at the age of two, she performed classical ballet for about 16 years before moving to America after high school to study jazz and hip-hop dance.

Fami played the piano and violin before picking up bass guitar in junior high school at the request of a friend. She plays in the fingerpicking style, explaining that she gave up trying to play with a pick after finding it "impossible". Because there are two guitars in Lovebites, Fami feels the bass needs to have a grating and distorted sound.

== Band members ==
Current

- Asami – lead vocals (2016–present)
- Midori – guitars, backing vocals (2016–present)
- Miyako – guitars, keyboards, backing vocals (2017–present); as a support musician (2016–2017)
- Haruna – drums (2016–present)
- Fami – bass guitar, backing vocals (2022–present)

Former

- Miho – bass guitar, backing vocals (2016–2021)

== Discography ==
Lovebites discography
- Studio albums: 5
- EPs: 4
- Live albums: 6
- Compilation albums: 1
- Singles: 1
- Video albums: 7
- Music videos: 12

=== Studio albums ===
Title	Album details	Peak chart positions		
Title	Album details	JPN Oricon	JPN Billboard Hot	JPN Billboard Top
Awakening from Abyss	Released: October 25, 2017; Label: Victor, JPU, Sliptrick	18	33	22
Clockwork Immortality	Released: December 5, 2018; Label: Victor, JPU, Arising Empire	21	23	21
Electric Pentagram	Released: January 29, 2020; Label: Victor, JPU, Red River	9	12	12
Judgement Day	Released: February 22, 2023; Label: Victor, JPU	5	5	5
Outstanding Power	Released: February 18, 2026; Label: Victor, Napalm	8	85	7

=== EPs ===
Title	Album details	Peak chart positions		
Title	Album details	JPN Oricon	JPN Billboard Hot	JPN Billboard Top
The Lovebites EP	Released: May 24, 2017; Label: Victor, JPU, Sliptrick	27	40	22
Battle Against Damnation	Released: June 6, 2018; Label: Victor, JPU	20	24	18
Glory, Glory, to the World	Released: March 10, 2021; Label: Victor, JPU	11	10	11
Lovebites EP II	Released: August 28, 2024; Label: Victor, JPU	11	9	9

=== Live albums ===
Title	Album details	Peak chart positions		
Title	Album details	JPN Oricon	JPN Billboard Hot	JPN Billboard Top
Daughters of the Dawn – Live in Tokyo	Released: July 10, 2019; Label: Victor	53	—	44
Five of a Kind – Live in Tokyo 2020	Released: July 22, 2020; Label: Victor	27	49	28
Heavy Metal Never Dies – Live in Tokyo 2021	Released: September 29, 2021; Label: Victor, JPU	38	32	34
Knockin' at Heaven's Gate – Live in Tokyo 2023	Released: August 23, 2023; Label: Victor, JPU	30	23	23
Knockin' at Heaven's Gate – Part II	Released: December 20, 2023; Label: Victor, JPU	—	54	45
Memorial for the Warrior Souls	Released: August 28, 2024; Label: Victor, JPU	41	40	34
No More Tragedy	Released: March 5, 2025; Label: Victor, JPU	46	—	37
"—" denotes a recording that did not chart.

=== Compilation albums ===
Title	Album details	Peak chart positions		
Title	Album details	JPN Oricon	JPN Billboard Hot	JPN Billboard Top
In the Beginning – The Best of 2017–2021	Released: December 22, 2021; Label: Victor, JPU	22	22	21

=== Video albums ===
Title	Album details	Peak chart positions	
Title	Album details	JPN Oricon DVD	JPN Oricon Blu-ray
Daughters of the Dawn – Live in Tokyo	Released: July 10, 2019; Label: Victor	13	12
Five of a Kind – Live in Tokyo 2020	Released: July 22, 2020; Label: Victor	13	10
Awake Again – Live from Abyss	Released: December 25, 2020 (built to order); Label: Victor	—	—
Heavy Metal Never Dies – Live in Tokyo 2021	Released: September 29, 2021; Label: Victor, JPU	4	9
Knockin' at Heaven's Gate – Live in Tokyo 2023	Released: August 23, 2023; Label: Victor, JPU	4	4
Knockin' at Heaven's Gate – Part II	Released: December 20, 2023; Label: Victor, JPU	—	—
Memorial for the Warrior Souls	Released: August 28, 2024; Label: Victor, JPU	13	9
No More Tragedy	Released: March 5, 2025; Label: Victor, JPU	6	8
"—" denotes a recording that did not chart.

=== Singles ===
Title	Year	Peak chart positions		Album
Title	Year	JPN Oricon	JPN Top Singles Sales	Album
"Golden Destination"	2020	20	22	Electric Pentagram

=== Music videos ===
Year	Song	Director
2017	"Don't Bite the Dust"	Naoki Takeyama
2017	"Shadowmaker"	Naoki Takeyama
2018	"The Crusade"	Naoki Takeyama
2018	"Rising"	Takanori Yamada
2019	"When Destinies Align"	Naoki Takeyama
2020	"Golden Destination"	Unknown
2021	"Winds of Transylvania" (2 versions)	Naoki Takeyama
2021	"Glory to the World"	Naoki Takeyama
2021	"Nameless Warrior"	Naoki Takeyama
2022	"Judgement Day"	Naoki Takeyama
2023	"Stand and Deliver (Shoot 'em Down)"	Naoki Takeyama
2024	"Unchained"	Naoki Takeyama
2025	"The Castaway"	Naoki Takeyama

== Awards and nominations ==
Metal Hammer Golden Gods Awards

Year	Nominee / work	Award	Result
2018	Lovebites	Best New Band	Won
