= Stand and Deliver (disambiguation) =

Stand and Deliver is a 1988 film.

Stand and Deliver may also refer to:

== Film and television ==
- Stand and Deliver (1928 film), a 1928 silent film
- "Stand and Deliver" (Supergirl), an episode of Supergirl
- NXT Stand & Deliver, an annual professional wrestling pay-per-view event produced by WWE
- Stand and Deliver (Scooby-Doo! Mystery Incorporated), a Scooby-Doo! Mystery Incorporated episode

== Music ==
- "Stand and Deliver" (Adam and the Ants song), 1981
- "Stand and Deliver" (Mr. Mister song), 1987
- "Stand and Deliver" (Eric Clapton song), 2020
- "Stand & Deliver", a 1981 song by Bram Tchaikovsky from the album Funland
- "Stand and Deliver", a 2004 song by Airbourne from Ready to Rock
- "Stand and Deliver (Shoot 'em Down)", a 2023 song by Lovebites from Judgement Day

== Other ==
- Stand and Deliver, a painting by N. C. Wyeth

== See also ==
- Highwayman, a robber who stole from travellers often using this phrase
