= Outstanding Power =

2026 studio album by Lovebites

Studio album by Lovebites
- Released: February 18, 2026
- Genre: Power metal
- Length: 64:10
- Label: Victor

Lovebites chronology
Lovebites EP II (2024)	Outstanding Power (2026)

Lovebites studio albums chronology
Judgement Day (2023)	Outstanding Power (2026)

Outstanding Power is the fifth studio album by Japanese power metal band Lovebites. It was released in Japan on February 18, 2026, by Victor Entertainment, and internationally by Napalm Records.

== Themes ==
"Reaper's Lullaby" marks the first time Lovebites utilized elements of black metal, and Miyako called it one of the "darkest" songs in their catalogue.

== Release and promotion ==
Outstanding Power was released in Japan on February 18, 2026, by Victor Entertainment. On the same day, Lovebites announced they had signed with Napalm Records, the latter of whom released the album digitally outside of Asia, with a physical release following on May 8, 2026. The music video for "The Castaway" preceded the album's release. Additionally, they performed at the Nippon Budokan for the first time on March 29. The latter was completely sold out and saw Lovebites announce the Outstanding Tour, their largest Japanese tour to date, which will feature ten shows in nine cities from August 29 to September 26.

== Reception ==
Outstanding Power debuted at number 8 on the Oricon Albums Chart. It also reached number 85 and 1 on Billboard Japan's Hot Albums and Oricon Rock Albums Sales charts respectively.

== Track listing ==
All lyrics are written by Asami.

Outstanding Power track listing
No.	Title	Music	Length
1.	"The Castaway"	Miyako	6:07
2.	"Silence the Void"	Miyako	5:39
3.	"Forbidden Thirst"	Haruna	5:00
4.	"Blazing Halo"	Fami, Mao	3:49
5.	"Dream of King"	Miyako	6:03
6.	"Phoenix Rises Again"	Mao	4:44
7.	"Out of Control"	Miyako	4:39
8.	"Wheels on Fire"	Asami, Midori, Mao	4:29
9.	"The Eve of Change"	Asami, Mao	5:00
10.	"Reaper's Lullaby"	Asami, Miyako	5:34
11.	"Eternally"	Asami	7:20
12.	"One Will Remain"	Miyako	5:46
Total length:			64:10

== Personnel ==
Lovebites

- Asami – vocals
- Midori – guitars
- Miyako – guitars and keyboards
- Fami – bass
- Haruna – drums

Other

- Mao – keyboards and programming
- Mikko Karmila – mixing
- Mika Jussila – mastering

== Charts ==
=== Weekly charts ===
Weekly chart performance for Outstanding Power
Chart (2026)	Peak position
French Physical Albums (SNEP)	197
French Rock & Metal Albums (SNEP)	68
Japanese Albums (Oricon)	8
Japanese Combined Albums (Oricon)	7
Japanese Hot Albums (Billboard Japan)	85
Japanese Rock Albums (Oricon)	1
UK Album Downloads (Official Charts)	60

=== Monthly charts ===
Monthly chart performance for Outstanding Power
Chart (2026)	Position
Japanese Albums (Oricon)	24
Japanese Rock Albums (Oricon)	2
