= Mikko Karmila =

Finnish musician (1964–2026)

- Born: 3 February 1964; Lohja, Finland
- Died: 9 September 2026 (aged 62)
- Occupation: Music producer

Mikko Santeri Karmila (Born in Lohja, 3 February 1964, died 9 September 2026) was a Finnish rock and heavy metal producer and audio mixer.

== Biography ==
He worked on more than 300 albums and is best known for his work as a mixer at Finnvox studios, as well as collaborating on numerous Spinefarm Records releases.

Karmila has produced for bands and artists such as Road Crew, Stone, Kotiteollisuus, Norther, Nightwish, Sentenced, Lullacry, Sonata Arctica, Amorphis, Waltari, Tarot, Peer Günt, Timo Kotipelto, Timo Tolkki, Timo Rautiainen, Stratovarius, Moon Cakes, Don Huonot, Charon, Children of Bodom, Tracedawn, Popeda, Lovebites and Lordi.

He was also a member of the bands Itä-Saksa and Moon Cakes.

In 1991, he won the award for Best Producer of the Year at the Emma Gaala.
