= Glory, Glory, to the World =

2021 EP by Lovebites

EP by Lovebites
- Released: March 10, 2021
- Recorded: Studio Move 705; CPR Studio; MIT Studio; DSW Studio; Miyako Studio; MTHK Studio
- Genre: Power metal
- Length: 22:53
- Label: Victor
- Producer: Steve Jacobs

Lovebites chronology
Electric Pentagram (2020)	Glory, Glory, to the World (2021)	Judgement Day (2023)

Glory, Glory, to the World is the third EP by Japanese power metal band Lovebites. The EP was released in Japan on March 10, 2021, by Victor Entertainment. It was released in the United Kingdom by JPU Records on May 28, 2021. It debuted at number 10 on the Billboard Japan Hot Albums chart, and number 11 on the Oricon Albums Chart. It is the final studio release to feature bassist and founding member Miho, who left the band five months later.

== Background ==
Glory, Glory, to the World was written and recorded in 2020 during the COVID-19 pandemic. Lovebites' tour in support of their third album, Electric Pentagram, was halted half-way through and the members could not decide what to do. They received the opportunity to write a theme song for the anime series Vlad Love, and set to work on it in spring 2020. Work on the EP started in the summer. Unlike previous writing and recording sessions, all five band members threw in ideas and shaped the songs.

Vocalist Asami said it took a long time to arrange the songs as traveling was difficult due to the pandemic. However, she did visit each member at their home as it is always faster to exchange ideas in person. Guitarist Midori believes that working remotely allowed them to spend more time on arrangements, giving them greater freedom with time to experiment. The bassist and two guitarists recorded their parts from home, but the drums and vocals were recorded in a studio with as few people present as necessary. Midori came up with the album title from the line "Glory, glory, hallelujah" in the song "Battle Hymn of the Republic". It became Glory, Glory, to the World in reference to the global pandemic. In a press release the band said, "On one hand, working on this album during the spread of coronavirus has been mentally draining. On the other, the music created in such darkness has managed to become full of feelings of salvation and light. This body of work is full of a positive power unlike anything else in the history of LOVEBITES".

Like all of their releases, it was mixed by Mikko Karmila and mastered by Mika Jussila at Finnvox Studios in Helsinki, Finland. Also returning, The EasyRabbit CreArtions, a duo of Spanish artists David López Gómez and Carlos Vincente León, provided the cover art of a wolf. Midori described the art, "The chained sphere is a metaphor for the unstable and weakened Earth, representing the current state of the world. The three angels in the top right are shining down light onto the chaotic world, and then there's the wolf, a symbol of the band, welcoming the light. One of the angels is carrying a staff with a symbol of peace, and the cliff itself symbolises Gaia." The wolf, which appears on all but the band's debut release, symbolizes that by playing the non-mainstream genre of heavy metal Lovebites are a "lone wolf" in the music scene.

== Themes ==
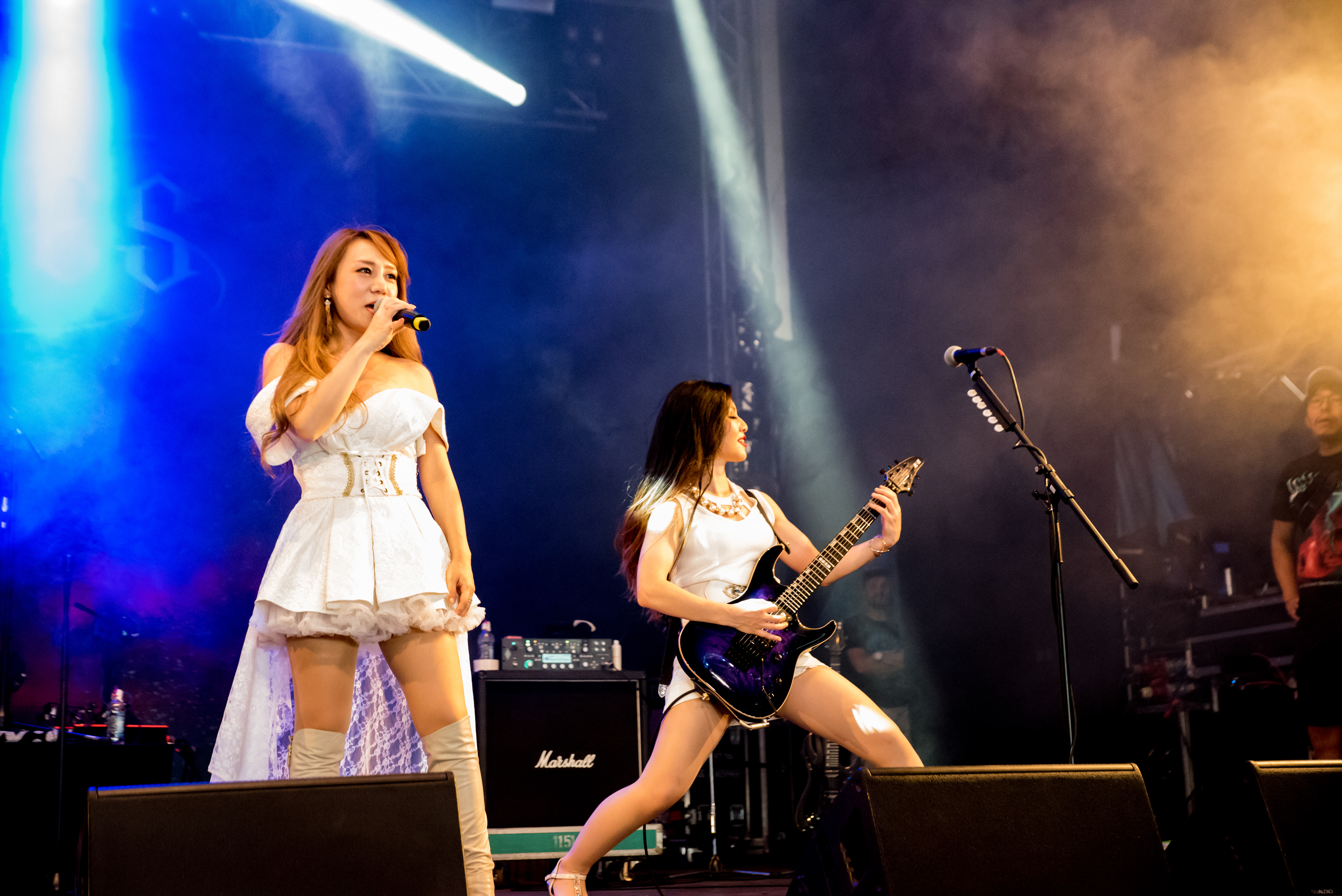
Asami (left) wrote "Paranoia" to fulfill her newfound love of thrash metal, while Midori (right) composed "Glory to the World" under the influence of gospel music.

Opening track "Glory to the World" was composed by Midori. She was inspired by attending Sunday services at black churches whenever she visits the United States or the United Kingdom. She has always liked gospel music, and said the song has elements of gospel and a section for pipe organ. Describing church music as "powerful," particularly when enhanced by worshipers, the guitarist arranged the song to be "sacred" and church-like in a broad sense. Midori cited the unison and harmony between the two guitars and bass on "Glory to the World" as the most difficult thing on the EP due to how fast some phrases are. Because of the COVID-19 pandemic, Asami wrote the lyrics to have a positive message and also included the phrase "hallelujah" to have a "holy element."

The Miyako-composed "No Time to Hesitate" was the last song written for the EP. With the other three tracks already decided, Asami wanted another upbeat song. The singer praised the drum arrangement done by Haruna for significantly changing the impression the song gives when compared to its demo.

Speaking of "Paranoia", Asami said it came from her newfound love of thrash metal. Previously she wrote ballad-type tracks, but decided to give thrash a try as she enjoys performing Lovebites' songs "The Hammer of Wrath", "M.D.O." and "Thunder Vengeance". She initially assumed that thrash songs would be the hardest to sing, but has since found that she is able to record such songs in one take. Although she normally starts with the melody when writing songs, for thrash songs she starts with the guitar riff and said melody comes last. The vocalist revealed that since she can not play guitar, she writes the riffs on piano, which makes it difficult for guitarists Midori and Miyako to replicate. However, Midori said this is a challenge she enjoys, as she also uses keyboard to write guitar solos, and that the guitar on "Paranoia" was done quickly.

Asami said that "Dystopia Symphony" has a "suite-like image" with various developments like progressive rock. According to Midori the song is about Ludwig van Beethoven's sorrow, with Distorted Sound reporting it is specifically about him overcoming his hearing loss. Asami revealed that Miyako composed it based on the classical composer's "Piano Sonata No. 8". Midori believes it marks the first time she has played this kind of progressive rock.

Some versions of the EP include the song "Winds of Transylvania". It was written to be the opening theme of the anime series Vlad Love. Lovebites were shown a rough version of the show, which they used to influence the music and lyrics, and were asked by the anime's staff to make it about the vampire girl character Mai. Asami, who co-composed it with the band's frequent collaborator Mao, heard that the staff particularly liked thrash metal, and after various meetings with them, it was decided to use a speed metal song instead of a melodic one. She made it during spring 2020 and initially did not plan to make it into a full song, revealing that it took a lot of trial and error to fit the 89-second time limit of the opening animation. Midori said the thing that stands out the most in the 89 seconds are the dive bombs she plays on the track. Its piano intro uses Beethoven's "Symphony No. 5" as a motif. The song was previously included on a CD with the three other themes of the anime that was released at Ichigo Animation's CulZone stores on January 9, 2021.

== Release ==
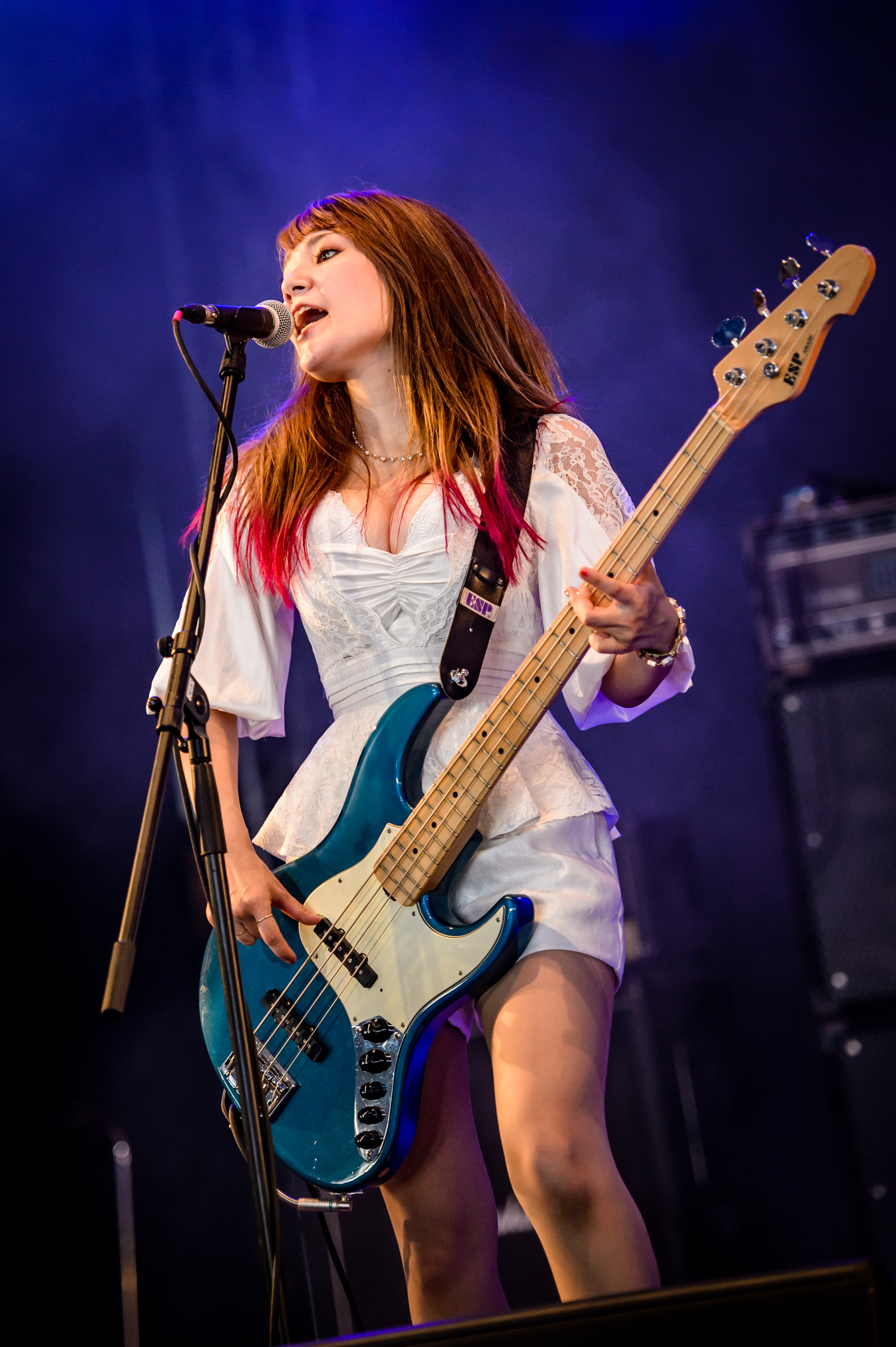
Glory, Glory, to the World is Lovebites' final release to feature Miho.

Glory, Glory, to the World was released in Japan on March 10, 2021, by Victor Entertainment. Limited Edition A includes a DVD of three music videos; the video for "Glory to the World" and two versions of the video for "Winds of Transylvania". Limited Edition B includes a second CD with "Winds of Transylvania" and its instrumental version. The music video for "Glory to the World" features the band playing in a church and an actor portraying Jesus Christ resurrected in the current era. The music video for "Winds of Transylvania" features Asami dressed in a black outfit based on that of the main character in Vlad Love, while one version of it also features scenes from the anime. The sold out national Ride for Vengeance Tour was originally set to take place between January 24 and March 5, but was rescheduled to between March 12 and April 6 following the Japanese government's declaration of a second state of emergency due to the pandemic and its extension. They were also conducted at half capacity and with other preventive measures in place, such as the audience not being allowed to cheer.

Roughly four months later, bassist, bandleader and co-founder Miho announced her departure from Lovebites on August 17, 2022. Victor released a limited edition 12" vinyl record version of the EP, that includes "Winds of Transylvania", on September 28, 2022 under the Japanese title Kōtetsu no Fukuin (鋼鉄の福音, "Gospel of Steel").

Glory, Glory, to the World was released on CD in the UK on May 28, 2021 by JPU Records, followed by a vinyl release in the summer of 2021. Their version includes "Winds of Transylvania" as a bonus track.

== Reception ==
Professional ratings
Review scores
Source	Rating
Distorted Sound	8/10
Invicta	8/10
Kerrang!	3/5
Noizze	8/10

Glory, Glory, to the World debuted at number 10 on the Billboard Japan Hot Albums chart. It reached number 11 on the Oricon Albums Chart and charted for four weeks. It also peaked at number 11 on Billboard Japan's Top Albums Sales chart, which is based only on physical sales.

Peter Dennis of AVO Magazine wrote that Glory, Glory, to the World finds Lovebites further developing their sound and reaching new levels of technicality. He described opening track "Glory to the World" as creating an "ethereal, almost quasi-religious feel that makes the coming storm even more volatile" and called "No Time to Hesitate" a "punchy, hard-hitting" "metal masterclass" that highlights Haruna's drumming.

In an 8/10 review for Distorted Sound, Sam Khaneka wrote that Lovebites took a less-is-more approach with the EP by creating a handful of songs that "all exude their own distinct character." He cited the "angelic splendour" of "Glory to the World" and the "neoclassical nightmare" of "Dystopia Symphony" as representing two of the band's best songs to date, "while also showcasing the breadth of their sound; from the overwhelmingly upbeat to the downright menacing." Reviewing the UK version, Khaneka felt that finishing with "Winds of Transylvania" was a "little bit anticlimactic" following "Dystopia Symphony".

Dan Beard of Invicta also gave Glory, Glory, to the World an 8/10 and called it "a celebration of fun, utilising top class musicianship, theatrics and respect for the elements that please fans of the genre." He described Midori and Miyako's memorable guitar work on "Paranoia" as full of individual character and top notch technique, "proving that guitar heroes aren't dead, they're heroine's now." Although criticizing the lyrics of "No Time to Hesitate" as "merely do[ing] their job during the verses," he praised its chorus vocal melody for sticking in the listener's head for days. Despite praising Haruna's drumming "punctuated with exciting guitar textures and Asami's soaring vocals over the top which contains the chaos and brings everything together cohesively," Beard felt that "Dystopia Symphony" was "just not as memorable" and a slight misstep.

Metal Talk wrote that "Glory to the World" has an uplifting symphonic chorus and a twin guitar section that would make Iron Maiden and Judas Priest envious. Sam Law of Kerrang! gave Glory, Glory, to the World a 3/5 rating and claimed that while it will not change the minds of the band's critics, "even doubtful newcomers will struggle not to be swept along."

== Track listing ==
All lyrics are written by Asami.

Glory, Glory, to the World track listing
No.	Title	Music	Arrangement	Length
1.	"Glory to the World"	Midori, Mao	Lovebites, Mao	6:24
2.	"No Time to Hesitate"	Miyako	Lovebites, Miyako, Mao	4:12
3.	"Paranoia"	Asami, Mao	Lovebites, Mao	5:35
4.	"Dystopia Symphony"	Miyako	Lovebites, Miyako, Mao	6:42
Total length:				22:53

Limited Edition A DVD
No.	Title	Length
1.	"Glory to the World"
2.	"Winds of Transylvania"
3.	"Winds of Transylvania (Vlad Love Version)"

Limited Edition B CD
No.	Title	Music	Arrangement	Length
1.	"Winds of Transylvania"	Asami, Mao	Lovebites, Mao	5:17
2.	"Winds of Transylvania (Instrumental)"	Asami, Mao	Lovebites, Mao	5:17

== Personnel ==
Lovebites

- Haruna – drums
- Miho – bass guitar
- Midori – guitars
- Miyako – guitars and keyboards
- Asami – vocals

Other

- Mao – keyboards and programming
- Steve Jacobs – production
- Mikko Karmila – mixing
- Mika Jussila – mastering

== Charts ==
Chart performance of Glory, Glory, to the World
Chart (2021)	Peak position
Japan Hot Albums (Billboard)	10
Japan Albums (Oricon)	11
