= Midori Tatematsu =

Japanese guitarist (born 1988)

Midori Tatematsu 立松 緑
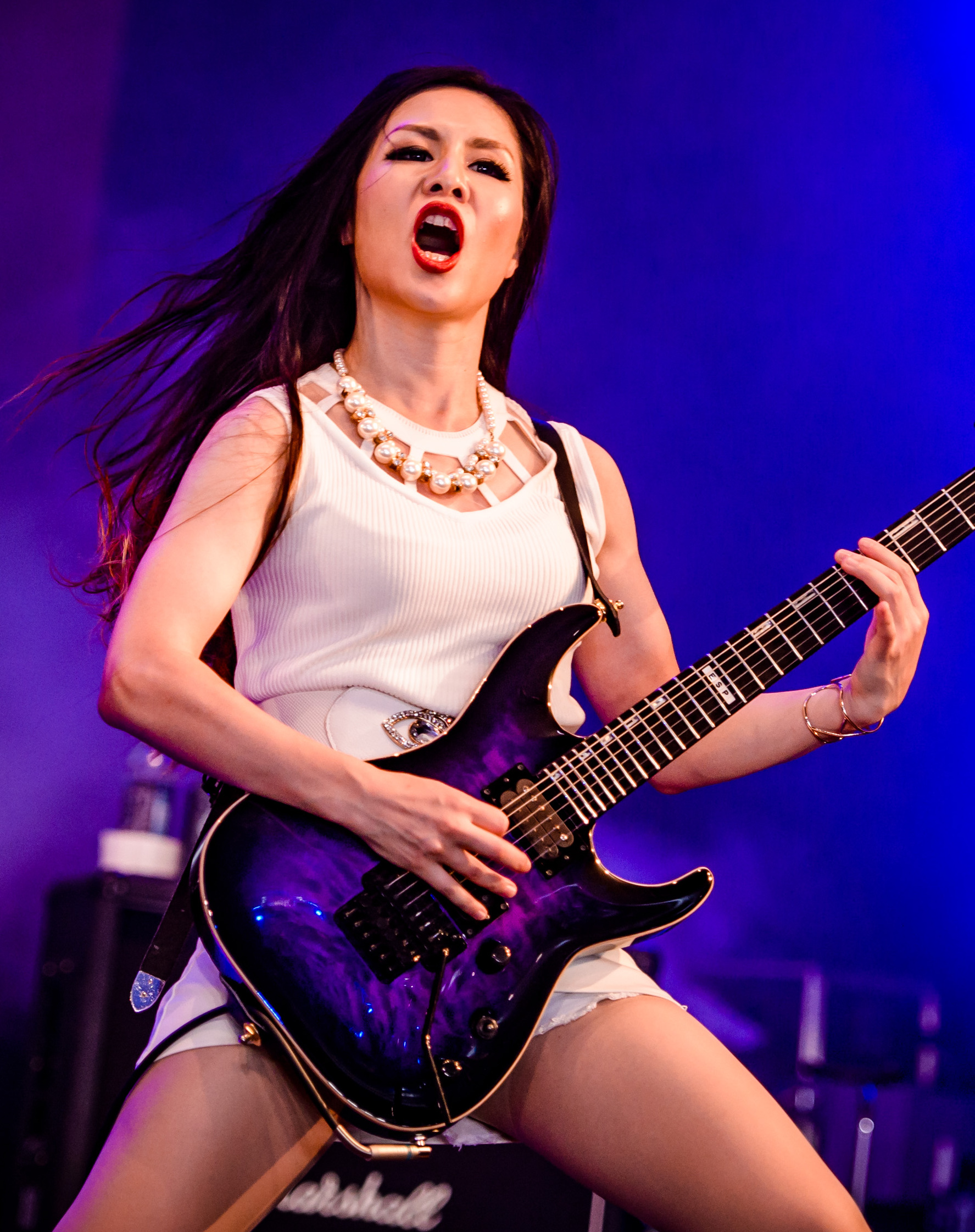
- Midori performing at Wacken Open Air, 2018

Background information
- Born: May 28, 1988 (age 38); Takamatsu, Kagawa, Japan
- Origin: Osaka
- Genre: Power metal
- Occupation: Musician
- Instrument: Guitar
- Years active: 2013–present
- Member of: Lovebites
- Professional bodybuilder

Best statistics
- Height: 150 cm (4 ft 11 in)
- Weight: 41 kg (90 lb)

Professional (Pro) career
- Active: 2021–present
Medal record
Women's fitness
| Silver medal – second place | 14th Kita-ku Open | Body Fitness |
| Silver medal – second place | 58th Tokyo Championship | Under 158 cm |

Midori Tatematsu (Japanese: 立松 緑; born May 28, 1988) is a Japanese heavy metal musician and fitness competitor. She is best known as a guitarist of the all-female band Lovebites since their founding in 2016. She was previously in the all-female band Gekijo Metalicche from 2013 to 2016. Midori began weight training in November 2021 during a hiatus in Lovebites' activities, and has since earned two silver medals in fitness competitions.

== Early life ==
Midori Tatematsu was born in Takamatsu, Kagawa on May 28, 1988. She started to learn piano at around two or three years of age and electric organ at eight. She moved to Kyoto when she entered university and gave up both instruments but started to learn guitar at 20. Midori is a graduate of Musicians Institute Japan in Osaka. It was there that she began to think about becoming a professional musician. She liked and played a variety of genres at the music school, mainly metal and technical music. Her first time playing electric guitar on a stage was with a brass band. Eventually, after trying various things, she decided she wanted to be in a metal band.

== Music career ==
Midori made her professional debut as a member of the all-female metal band Gekijo Metalicche (激情★めたりっちぇ). The Osaka-based trio was formed in June 2013 at the suggestion of composer Yoshingwie Masamsteen, who was a classmate of Midori's at MI Japan. He was a fan of all-girl bands, but, as he is a man, told Midori to form one and he would provide the music. She agreed and recruited vocalist Migaki Nishino and drummer Tsubasa "Zen" Zenta through contacts at MI Japan. After meeting Migaki, whom Midori said looked like a member of AKB48 and sang in a moe voice, they decided to combine that vocal and visual style with metal. Takayuki Murakami of Barks described Gekijo Metalicche's music as an aggressive sound based on heavy metal and featuring death voices and shouts, but in an original concept that combines it with loli voices, technical playing, and cute visuals like idols. As such, they were labeled gap moe, referring to the "gap" or difference between their idol-like appearance and intense musicality. Because they are Japanese Zen did not want to use English in their band's name, therefore it is a mix of kanji and hiragana. She coined "metalicche" as a cute version of "metal", Midori added "gekijo" which means "passion", and Migaki wanted to add a "★".

Gekijo Metalicche had their first concert on August 1, 2013, which was also the release date of their first single, "Imi no Hate/Sekai 'kan'". The band's second single, "Hissatsu! Reversible", was released on February 2, 2014, and followed by the mini-album I Yassaaa on September 6, 2014. "Mirai Antai", their third single and last release on an indie label, was released on February 11, 2015. The band then signed with major record label King Records and released Upgrade (Kari), their first and only studio album, on May 13, 2015. Gekijo Metalicche disbanded on February 12, 2016, after Midori and Tsubasa decided to leave the band.

Later that year, Midori was announced as a member of the newly formed all-female heavy metal band Lovebites. She already knew bassist Miho, drummer Haruna, and guitarist Miyako, but the four chose vocalist Asami based on a demo she made. They had their first concert on November 18, 2016, at Tsutaya O-West as part of the Girls Band Next Generation event. Their debut EP, The Lovebites EP, was released in May 2017 via Victor Entertainment. Miho explained that it was more of a demo to get the band signed, but the label liked it so much they had it properly mastered and released. It was released in the United Kingdom and in North America later that year. At the time, Midori was the only official guitarist in the band. Support musician Miyako officially became their second guitarist in August 2017, and they released their first full-length album Awakening from Abyss that October. Lovebites played their first gigs outside Japan in London, England at the end of November 2017, and won the Metal Hammer Golden Gods Award for Best New Band in 2018. Over the next two years, the group released an EP and two studio albums while continuing to perform overseas, including major festivals such as Wacken Open Air, Download Festival, and Graspop Metal Meeting. After releasing their third EP Glory, Glory, to the World, Lovebites had a year-long hiatus between the departure of Miho in August 2021 and the joining of Fami in October 2022. Their comeback album, February 2023's Judgement Day, became their highest-charting record to date when it reached number 5 on both the Oricon and Billboard Japan charts.

Midori provided music to the 2020 video game No Straight Roads, and a guitar solo to Masahiro Aoki's 2025 song "Everfall", which was created for the video game Sixtar Gate: Stargaze and included on Aoki's album Chronicle II.

== Musicianship ==
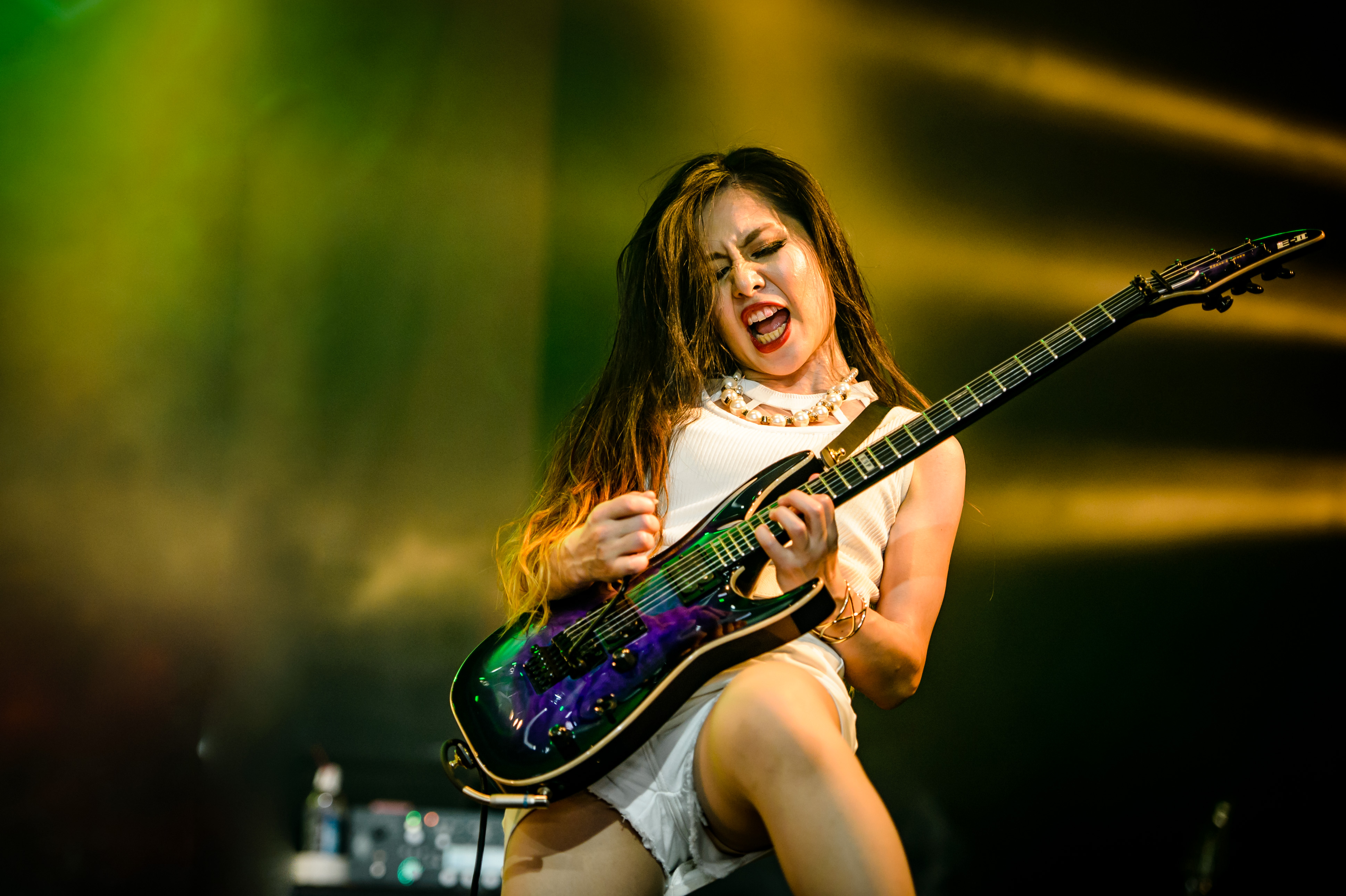
Midori is known for her technical guitar playing.

Midori is known for her technical proficiency and the use of various techniques in her guitar playing, such as legato, string skipping, sweep picking, tapping, eight-finger tapping and use of vibrato arms. Andrew Daly of Guitar World wrote that, "Guitar hero status seems to have come naturally to Tatematsu, whose feats of death-defying alternate picking and neoclassical arpeggios are routinely astonishing." Because of this variety, the guitarist herself feels she does not have a well-defined personal style. "However, if you ask me if I care about that, I really don't (laughs). Basically, I always play the guitar while thinking, 'I hope I can make a solo that fits the song or do something interesting.'" Midori has said that she is conscious of playing with emotion and that this can be seen in her facial expressions, which she noted not many female guitarists do. Due to her presence and mobility on stage and audience interaction, Miyako described Midori as "super aggressive" and the complete opposite of herself. Both musicians agreed that they have differing styles, and can therefore provide the band with that which the other is missing. Midori only has a few songwriting co-credits in Lovebites, namely "Dancing with the Devil", "Glory to the World", and "We Are the Resurrection". However, as she speaks English, she helps write the band's lyrics, which are usually written in Japanese before being translated into English. She also always writes her own guitar solos. Generally speaking, Midori said that she plays the "flashy and aggressive" guitar solos in Lovebites, while Miyako plays the "slower, more melodic" ones. "I like weird phrases, weird solos, and punchy stuff rather than classic pentatonic solos", "I want to play phrases that make guitar kids think, 'What is this?'"

Midori became interested in heavy metal music from Galneryus and visual kei metal bands such as Deluhi. She later said, "The more I played guitar, the more I started thinking I wanted to play more technically difficult and complex music, so I shifted to [metal]." She traced those bands' roots to Western metal and studied guitarists that were featured in magazines. Midori cited Galneryus' Syu as her favorite guitarist and said he has a uniquely Japanese style of playing. She has since listed Kiko Loureiro, Nuno Bettencourt and Yngwie Malmsteen as her biggest guitar influences. Particularly, Loureiro for his wide variety of licks and Brazilian fusion-like nuances, Bettencourt for his sense of rhythm and the way he builds solos, and Malmsteen for his vibrato.

== Equipment ==
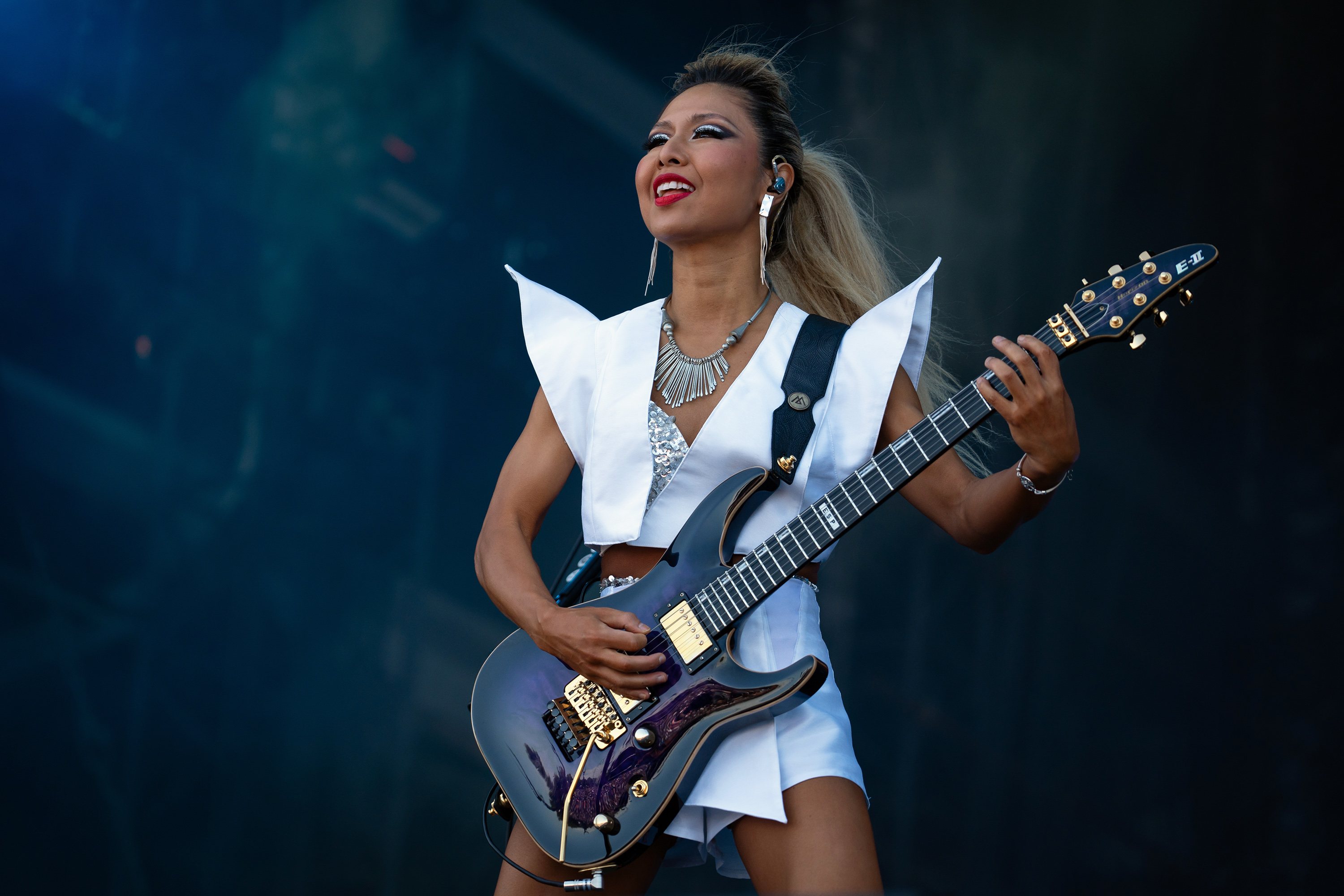
Midori uses ESP Horizon guitars.

Midori almost exclusively uses ESP Guitars, mainly E-II Horizons with Floyd Roses. She explained, "the high frets are easy to play and the balance of the guitar is good, so it suits my technical playing style." She previously used two different colors, each with a different tuning. The Reindeer Blue one has a purple paint job on its quilted maple top and Seymour Duncan pickups; an SH-1n '59 in the front and an SH-15 Alternative 8 in the back. The black E-II Horizon is nearly the same, but has a Seymour Duncan Sentient pickup in the front and is kept in drop D tuning. In Gekijo Metalicche and early Lovebites, she used a white ESP E-II FRX. In 2019, Midori collaborated with the ESP Guitar Craft Academies in Tokyo, Nagoya, Osaka, and Sendai to make one guitar each. She has since used two of them live; one that is based on the ESP Arrow shape, and the other that is a combination of an ESP Ultratone and Snapper. Of the latter, which is the only synchronized tremolo guitar she has, Midori said, "It's an all-around guitar with a lot of controls, which can make a variety of sounds, but retain its thickness." For acoustic guitar, she uses a Martin GPC-28E equipped with a Fender Fatfinger to prolong sustain.

In April 2026, ESP released Midori's signature model based on the E-II Horizon, the Horizon-FR Midori Custom. It has a hard maple top with mahogany back, a three-piece hard maple neck, an ebony fingerboard with stainless steel frets, and a "Glitter Storm Violet" paint job. It features gold-colored hardware, including Seymour Duncan SH-1n and SH-14 pickups, and a Floyd Rose bridge. At the same time, ESP also released a more affordable version under their Edwards brand, the E-Horizon-FR Midori Custom.

Midori has signature model guitar picks with ESP, and uses custom made guitar straps from Lamanta. For amplification, she mainly uses a Kemper Profiling Power Rack, which allows her to reproduce various amplifiers recorded from the actual source by having a USB with it preset. She uses a Marshall 1960BV cabinet. Midori only has a Kemper Profiler Remote at her feet. Her guitar tech also has one, and can control the Kemper from off stage; "That's why I can concentrate on playing and performing. Also, some songs use harmonizers, but Kemper allows me to make detailed settings and harmonize them clearly."

== Fitness career ==
In August 2021, Lovebites temporarily suspended all activities while they looked for a new bassist. Midori began weight training that November. She had always admired the physical beauty of athletes, but it was after seeing videos of Shanique Grant on YouTube that she decided to "see how far I could go". Although the focus is on muscles, the musician said she is also learning various other things in order to stay in shape so she can continue to play concerts. In August 2023, Midori stated that she essentially trains for one and a half to two and a half hours a day, three to five days a week, depending on the body part. She follows a low-fat diet all year long, but because she does not metabolize carbohydrates very well, she will adopt a ketogenic diet for a few days when she sees her lower body swelling.

Midori competes in bikini fitness competitions put on by the Japan Bodybuilding & Fitness Federation (JBBF), a branch of the International Fitness and Bodybuilding Federation. In her first contest on July 3, 2022, she came in sixth place in the Under 40 bikini fitness class at the 5th Muscle Fest Yokohama Open 2022. She also took sixth place in the Under 158 cm bikini fitness class of the 7th Kanto Bikini Fitness Championship on August 6, 2022. Midori earned her first medal when she took second place in the body fitness category at the 14th Kita-ku Open Bodybuilding Fitness Tournament on October 30, 2022. On July 2, 2023, she took fifth place in the Under 158 cm body fitness class of the 2023 Eastern Japan Fitness Championship. She won her second silver medal in the Under 158 cm body fitness class at the 58th Tokyo Bodybuilding Championship on July 16, 2023. Midori then took fourth place in the body fitness category of the 34th Japan Open Championships on August 6, 2023.

== Discography ==
=== With Lovebites ===
- Awakening from Abyss (2017)
- Clockwork Immortality (2018)
- Electric Pentagram (2020)
- Judgement Day (2023)
- Outstanding Power (2026)

=== With Gekijo Metalicche ===
- "Imi no Hate/Sekai 'kan'" (意味の果て／世界「観」; August 1, 2013)
- "Hissatsu! Reversible" (必殺!リバーシブル; February 2, 2014)
- I Yassaaa (September 6, 2014)
- "Mirai Antai" (未来安泰; February 11, 2015)
- Upgrade (Kari) (あっぷぐれーど（仮）; May 13, 2015)
