= The Lovebites EP =

2017 EP by Lovebites

EP by Lovebites
- Released: May 24, 2017
- Studio: Yokota Base Studio; DSW Studio; Mi-ya Studio; Studio Move 705
- Genre: Power metal
- Length: 21:09
- Label: Victor
- Producer: Steve Jacobs

Lovebites chronology
The Lovebites EP (2017)	Awakening from Abyss (2017)

The Lovebites EP is the debut EP by Japanese power metal band Lovebites. The EP was released in Japan on May 24, 2017, by Victor Entertainment, in Europe on August 25, 2017, by JPU Records, and in North America by Sliptrick Records on August 31, 2017. It reached number 27 on the Oricon chart and number 40 on Billboard Japan.

== Background and release ==
Lovebites was formed in Tokyo, Japan in 2016 by musicians who were all previously in well-known and established bands. From the very beginning, bassist and leader Miho knew she wanted to have English lyrics, and with vocalist Asami having studied abroad, three of the four songs on the EP are in English. Two of them were composed and arranged in collaboration with Lightbringer keyboardist Mao. Miho recorded her bass parts using an ESP AMAZE-ASM. Asami revealed that because she was new to heavy metal music, she was a little lost while recording her vocals.

Miho said that the EP was more of a demo to get the band signed, but the label liked it so much they had it properly mastered and released. It was mixed by Mikko Karmila and mastered by Mika Jussila at Finnvox Studios in Helsinki, Finland.

The Lovebites EP received a limited release of 3,000 copies in Japan on May 24, 2017, by Victor Entertainment. It was released in the United Kingdom on August 25 by JPU Records and in North America by Sliptrick Records on August 31.

All four of its songs were re-recorded with new arrangements for the band's first album released later in the year, Awakening from Abyss.

Victor released a limited edition vinyl record version of the EP, titled Junpaku no Ikazuchi (純白の雷, "Pure White Thunder") in Japanese, on August 7, 2019, with new liner notes by Masanori Ito. The songs were also given new Japanese titles; "Don't Bite the Dust" became "Zetsubō o Uchikudake!" (絶望を打ち砕け！, "Break the Despair!"), "The Apocalypse" was changed to "Shinpan no Hi" (審判の日, "Judgement Day"), "Scream for Me" became "Kyōran no Sakebi" (狂乱の叫び, "Frantic Scream"), and "Bravehearted" was changed to "Yūsha-tachi e no Sanka" (勇者たちへの讃歌, "Hymn to the Heroes").

All four songs were re-recorded a second time by the band for Re-Lovebites EP, which is a bonus disc included with a limited edition of their August 2024 Lovebites EP II.

== Themes ==
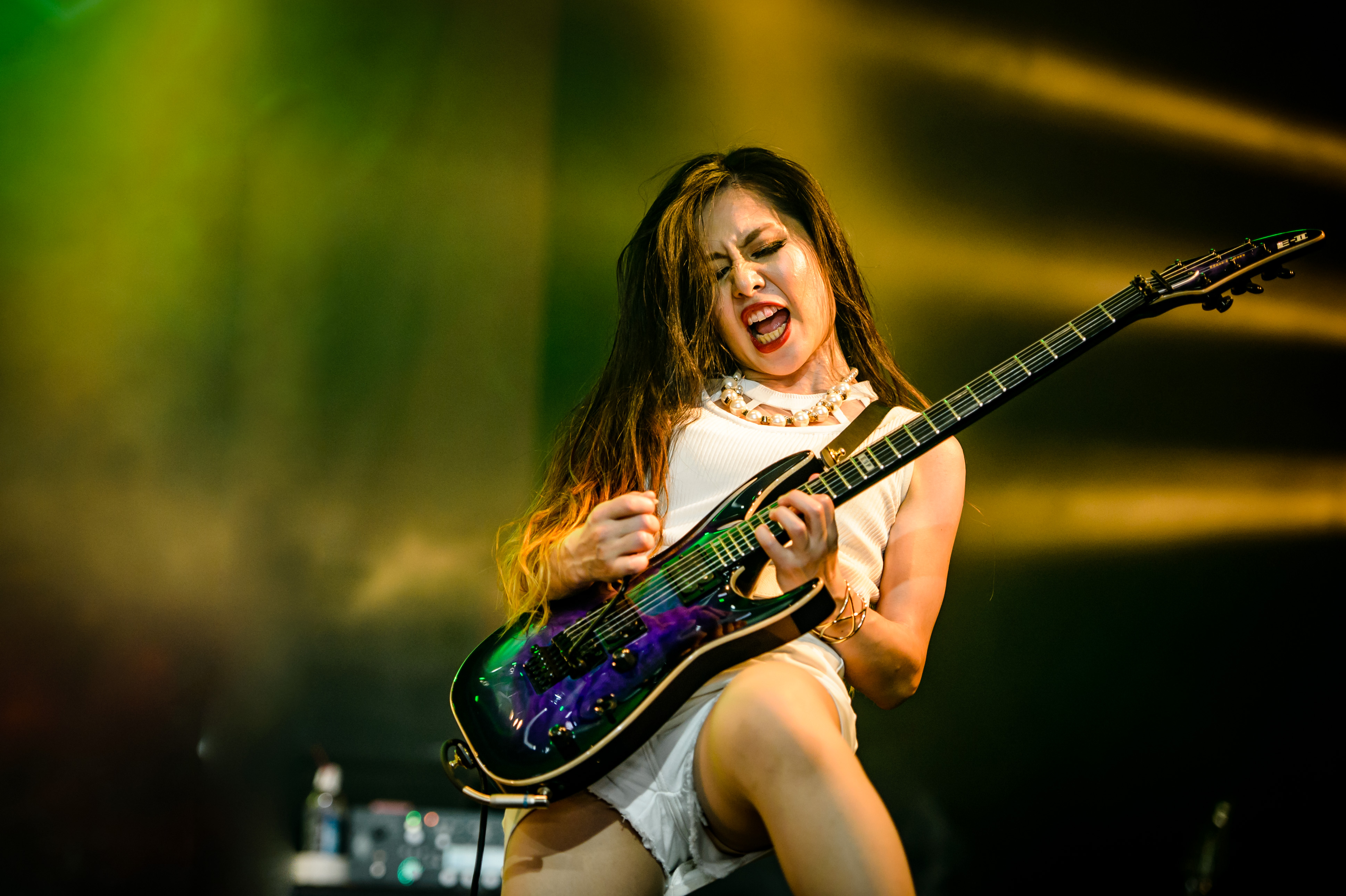
Midori's playing on the EP was influenced by Kiko Loureiro.

Miho called "Don't Bite the Dust" the easiest song to listen to on the EP, with its melody balancing the twin guitars and Iron Maiden-like galloping rhythm. It was influenced by and named after a supernatural ability from the Diamond Is Unbreakable arc of the manga and anime series JoJo's Bizarre Adventure. Its ending features a two octave jump by Asami, which she had never tried before.

"The Apocalypse" is the only song newly written for the EP. When writing it, Miho wanted thrash metal guitar riffs like Sodom. Its lyrics are about the atomic bombing of Hiroshima. At the suggestion of the producer, Midori played a bottleneck guitar solo for the first time on the track after doing research that included watching Derek Trucks videos on YouTube.

"Scream for Me" was composed by support guitarist and keyboardist Mi-ya. Its lyricist, Dr. U, is an American male acquaintance of hers who lives in Japan. For her bass parts on the track, Miho was thinking of Anthrax's song "Lone Justice".

The final track "Bravehearted" is the band's only song with lyrics in Japanese. Written by drummer Haruna, it is a new arrangement of an unreleased song by her and Miho's previous band Destrose.

== Reception ==
Professional ratings
Review scores
Source	Rating
Neo	5/5 stars

The Lovebites EP reached number 27 on the Oricon Albums Chart and stayed on the chart for four weeks. It peaked at number 40 on Billboard Japan's Hot Albums chart.

Numerous musicians praised the EP, including Kiko Loureiro of Angra, Stratovarius vocalist Timo Kotipelto, and Blind Guardian's Hansi Kürsch. Michael Weikath of Helloween said "What I consider the best about this material is that they construct a direct link to classic metal. And it is not sounding old fashioned, dusty or boring. It is fresh."

Tomokazu Nishihiro of Headbang Magazine wrote that the record's mix of "Maiden-esque power metal, early thrash metal, and dramatic metal" signals the birth of a promising newcomer.

Neo gave the EP a perfect rating, claiming it "would make Iron Maiden proud. LOVEBITES are metal stars in the making."

Japanese music-focused website JaME wrote that although it is the band's debut release, the EP is clearly the work of professional musicians with years of experience. They cited "Scream for Me" as the heaviest track "where melodic riffing is side-lined in favour of chugging power chords and some spontaneous showboating."

== Track listing ==
The Lovebites EP track listing
No.	Title	Lyrics	Music	Arrangement	Length
1.	"Don't Bite the Dust"	Miho	Miho, Mao	Lovebites, Mao	4:13
2.	"The Apocalypse"	Miho	Miho, Mao	Lovebites, Mao	5:00
3.	"Scream for Me"	Dr. U	Mi-ya	Lovebites, Mi-ya	5:46
4.	"Bravehearted"	Haruna	Haruna	Lovebites, Mi-ya	6:10
Total length:					21:09

== Personnel ==
Lovebites

- Haruna – drums
- Miho – bass
- Midori – guitars
- Asami – vocals

Other

- Mi-ya – guitars and keyboards
- Mao – keyboards and programming
- Steve Jacobs – production
- Mikko Karmila – mixing
- Mika Jussila – mastering

== Charts ==
Chart performance of The Lovebites EP
Chart (2017)	Peak position
Japan Hot Albums (Billboard)	40
Japanese Albums (Oricon)	27
