= Shibuya O-East =

Music venue in Shibuya, Tokyo, Japan

Coordinates: 35°39′31″N 139°41′44″E

Spotify O-East
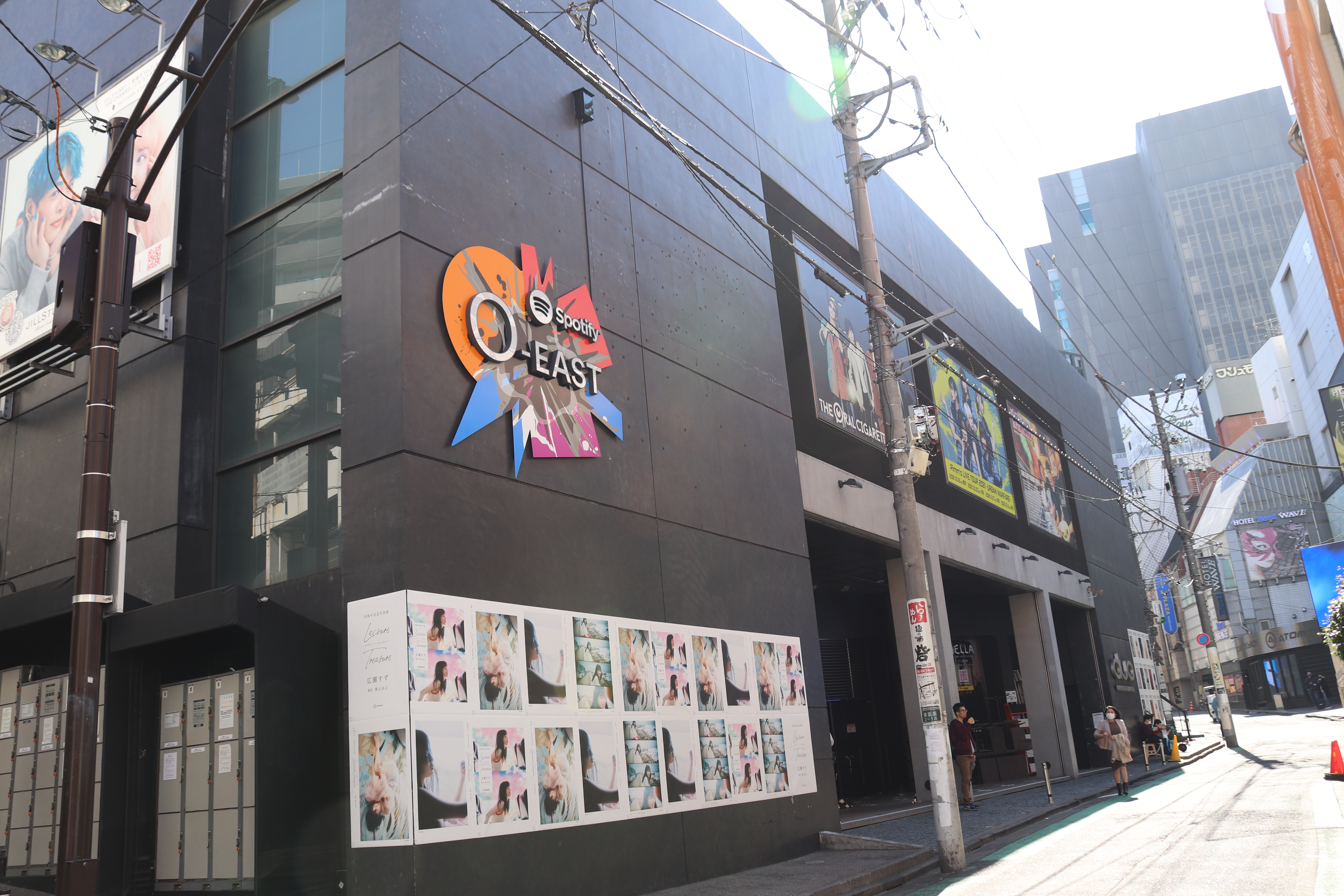
- Spotify O-East in 2022
- Interactive map of Spotify O-East
- Former names: On Air (1991–1994); On Air East (1994–2002); O-East (2003–2008); Shibuya O-East (2008–2013); Tsutaya O-East (2013–2021)
- Address: 2-14-8 Dogenzaka, Shibuya-ku; Shibuya, Tokyo; Japan
- Owner: Shibuya-O Group
- Capacity: 1,300 (all standing)

Construction
- Opened: February 1991
- Rebuilt: December 2003

Website
- shibuya-o.com/east/

Shibuya O-East (しぶや・オーイースト) is a music venue in Dogenzaka Chome, Shibuya, Tokyo, where every week, mostly Japanese bands and musicians perform. The venue was renamed Spotify O-East in December 2021, after a deal with the music-streaming service. It had previously been named Tsutaya O-East, under the terms of an eight-year deal with Culture Convenience Club.

It opened as On Air in February 1991, a single venue with capacity for 1,000 people; It changed its name to Shibuya On Air East in 1994, coinciding with the opening of Shibuya On Air West. It was closed in 2002 to be completely renovated and it was re-opened in December 2003 as the Shibuya O-East complex.

Since then the Shibuya O-East complex has become home to three separate music venues; the Duo Music Exchange, the O-East and the Shibuya O-Crest.

The Duo Music Exchange, a music venue and cafe bar, with a capacity of 700 people (standing) is located on the first floor of the building. The O-East, the main venue, with capacity for 1,300 people, is located between the second and fourth floor of the complex, which includes the main stage, a small bar, and a balcony.

The fifth floor is home to another venue, the Shibuya O-Crest a small venue which can accommodate 200 people.

Shibuya O-East and its sister venues are owned by the Shibuya-O Group, a subsidiary of Shibuya Television Co., Ltd. Shibuya Television acquired the venues in 2008.
