= Masanori Ito (music critic) =

Japanese music critic (born 1953)

- Born: July 10, 1953 (age 73); Hanamaki, Iwate Prefecture, Japan
- Occupations: Music critic Music journalist Radio personality
- Writing career
- Subjects: Heavy metal Hard rock Progressive rock

Masanori Ito (伊藤 政則, Itō Masanori; born July 10, 1953) is a Japanese music critic and radio personality, also known as Seisoku Ito and Masa Ito. His work is specialized in heavy metal and hard rock, and he is known as the leading music critic of Japan. He has been quick to introduce new heavy metal bands to Japan, through writing for magazines such as Burrn! and putting them on the air. Ito wrote the initial story draft of the 2022 film Hagane Iro no Sora no Kanata he (鋼音色の空の彼方へ), based on the story of Japanese thrash metal band Outrage.

== Appearances ==
=== TV ===
- Itō Seisoku no Rock City (Television Kanagawa)
- Itō Seisoku no Rock TV! (BS Fuji)

=== Radio ===
- Power Rock Today (Bay FM)
- Rockadom (FM Fuji)
- Rock On (FM802)
- Rock the Nation (Date fm)
- Kyō wa Ichinichi Maru Maru Zanmai (NHK FM)

== Bibliography ==
- Yes Kamigami no Kyōen (Shinkō Gakufu Shuppansha, 1979)
- Michael Schenker Flying V Densetsu (Shinkō Gakufu Shuppansha, March 1982) ISBN 4401610903
- Cozy Powell Kagirinaki Chōsen (Shinkō Music, November 1983) ISBN 4401611292
- Heavy Metal no Gyakushū (Shinchosha, April 1985) ISBN 4101395012
- Sēsoku no Housoku Jōgai Rantō Essay (Shinkō Music, March 1986) ISBN 4401611861
- Tsumi to Batsu: Official Ozzy Osbourne Story (CBS Sony Publishing, June 1986) ISBN 478970226X
- Dangen (Shinkō Music, February 1993) ISBN 4401614046
- Dangen Sono 2 (Shinkō Music, February 1999) ISBN 4401701518
- Mokugeki Shōgen Heavy Metal no Shōzō (Gakken Publishing, July 2013) ISBN 9784054057456
- Mokugeki Shōgen 2 (Heavy Metal: Tamashii no Tabiji) (Gakken Publishing, August 2014) ISBN 9784054060579
