= Jihad (disambiguation) =

Jihad is an Arabic word for "struggle", denoting a theological and legal concept in Islam, and there are several types of Jihad in Islam.

Jihad or variant spellings may also refer to:

== Arts, entertainment, and media ==
=== Literature ===
- Jehad, a 1984 novel by Simon Hawke (as Nicholas Yermakov)
- Jihad: The Trail of Political Islam, a 2000 book by Gilles Kepel
- Jihad! – The Secret War in Afghanistan, a 2000 novel by Tom Carew (pen name of Philip Sessarego), later withdrawn following allegations of false claims

=== Music ===
- Jihad (EP), by Otep, 2001
- "Jihad" (song), by Slayer, 2006
- "Jihad", a theme for Baldr Sky Dive 2, by Kotoko
- Jihad / Freezing Moon, a split album by The Meads of Asphodel and Mayhem, 2002
- Jihad (Points of Order), an album by Automaton, 1994
- Jihad, a song by D-A-D, 1989

=== Other uses in arts, entertainment, and media ===
- Jihad (comics) or Onslaught, a fictional mercenary team
- Djihad (film), 2006
- Jihad! The Musical, a musical comedy and jihad satire, 2007
- "The Jihad", an episode of Star Trek: The Animated Series

== People ==
See Jihad (name)

== Places ==
- Jehad, Iran
- Al Gihad, Libya
- Al-Jihad (Baghdad)

== Other uses ==
- Jihad (missile), 2024 Iranian missile
- Al-Jihad SC, a Syrian football club
- Al Jihad SC, the former name of AC Sporting, a Lebanese football club
- Jihad (militant group), a Sri Lankan militant group

== See also ==
- Cihat, a Turkish given name
- Ijtihad, the "struggle" of coming to a just verdict in jurisdiction
- Islamic Jihad (disambiguation)
- Jihadism
- Jyhad, a card game
- Mujahid (disambiguation)
- Mujahideen (disambiguation)
