= Holy War (disambiguation) =

A holy war is a religious war primarily caused or justified by differences in religion.

Holy War may also refer to:

== Sports rivalries ==
- Holy War (Boston College–Notre Dame), college football
- Holy War (BYU–Utah), college football
- Holy War (Saint Joseph's–Villanova), college basketball
- Holy War (Kraków), Wisła Kraków vs. KS Cracovia, professional football

== Music ==
- Holy War (Dragonland album), 2002
- Holy War (Thy Art Is Murder album), 2015
- "Holy War" (Toto song), 2015
- "Holy Wars... The Punishment Due", a song by Megadeth, 1990
- Holy Wars (album), an album by Tuxedomoon, 1985
- "Holy War", a song by Jon Butcher Axis from Wishes
- "Holy War", a song by Alicia Keys from Here
- "Holy War, a song by Lovebites from Electric Pentagram
- "The Holy War", a song by Thin Lizzy from Thunder and Lightning

== Other uses ==
- Holy War (locomotive), a steam locomotive on the Bala Lake Railway in Wales
- Holy War (board game), a 1979 board wargame
- Holy Wars (film), a 2010 documentary film
- The Holy War, a 1682 novel by John Bunyan
- Holy War, Inc., a 2001 book by Peter Bergen

== See also ==
- Fire Emblem: Genealogy of the Holy War
- Holy War, Batman!
- "Svyaschennaya Voyna", a song written on the day after the Nazi invasion of the USSR
- Crusade (disambiguation)
- Jihad (disambiguation)
- Dharamyudh (disambiguation)
- Religious conflict (disambiguation)
- Sacred War (disambiguation)
- War of Religion (disambiguation)
