= War of Religion =

War of Religion may refer to:

- European wars of religion, a series of European wars of the Sixteenth and Seventeenth Centuries
- French Wars of Religion, a specific series in the larger conflagration
- Crusades, a series of religious wars sanctioned by the Latin Church in the medieval period

== See also ==
- Crusade (disambiguation)
- Holy War (disambiguation)
- Jihad (disambiguation)
- Sacred War (disambiguation)
- Religious conflict (disambiguation)
