= Religious conflict =

Religious conflict may refer to:

- Religious abuse
- Religious censorship
- Religious discrimination
- Religious intolerance
- Religious persecution
- Religious violence
- Religious war
  - European wars of religion
  - Crusade (disambiguation)
  - Holy War (disambiguation)
  - Jihad (disambiguation)
  - Sacred War (disambiguation)
  - War of Religion (disambiguation)
- Sectarian violence
