= Ephorus =

Greek historian (c. 400 – 330 BC)

- Born: c. 400 BC; Cyme, Achaemenid Empire
- Died: 330 BC (aged c. 70)
- Children: 1

Ephorus of Cyme (/ˈɛfərəs/; Ancient Greek: Ἔφορος ὁ Κυμαῖος, Ephoros ho Kymaios; c. 400 BC – 330 BC) was an ancient Greek historian known for his universal history, now lost.

== Biography ==
Information on his biography is limited. He was born in Cyme, Aeolia, and together with the historian Theopompus was a pupil of Isocrates in rhetoric. He does not seem to have made much progress as a speaker, and at the suggestion of Isocrates himself he took up literary composition and the study of history. According to Plutarch, Ephorus declined Alexander the Great's offer to join him on his Persian campaign as the official historiographer. His son Demophilus followed in his footsteps as a historian.

== Main works ==
Ephorus' magnum opus was a set of 29 books recounting a universal history. The whole work, edited by his son Demophilus—who added a 30th book—contained a summary description of the Sacred Wars, along with other narratives from the days of the Heraclids up until the taking of Perinthus in 340 BC by Philip of Macedon, covering a time span of more than seven hundred years. According to Polybius, Ephorus was the first historian to ever author a universal history. For each of the 29 separate books, Ephorus wrote a prooimion. The work was probably simply named Historiai, and followed a thematic, rather than a strictly chronological order in its narrative. These writings are generally believed to be the main or sole source for Diodorus Siculus' account of the history of Greece between 480 and 340 BC, which is one of only two continuous narratives of this period that survive.

It is clear that Ephorus made critical use of the best authorities. His history was highly praised and read in antiquity, and later ancient historians freely drew upon his work. Large parts of the history of Diodorus Siculus may have originated in Ephorus's history. Strabo attached much importance to Ephorus's geographical investigations, and praised him for being the first to separate the historical from the simply geographical element. In his Geographica, Strabo quoted Ephorus at length. Polybius, while crediting him with a knowledge of the conditions of naval warfare, ridiculed his description of the 362 BCE Battle of Mantinea as showing ignorance of the nature of land operations.

== Additional works ==
Besides the universal history, Ephorus wrote an Epichorios logos (Ἐπιχώριος λόγος), a patriotic essay in which he praised the traditions of Cyme. He also wrote Peri heurematon (Περὶ εὑρημάτων), a book about inventions, and Peri lexeos (Περὶ λέξεως), "On Style".

Music was invented to deceive and delude mankind.
— Ephorus, in History, preface.

Other works attributed to him were:

- A Treatise on Discoveries
- Respecting Good and Evil Things
- The Remarkable Recipes
- On Remarkable Things in Various Countries (it is doubtful whether these were separate works, or just extracts from the Histories)
- A Treatise on my Country, on the history and antiquities of Cyme
- The Book of Goodness, his manual on achieving happiness and pleasing others.
- An Essay on Style, his only rhetorical work, which is occasionally mentioned by the rhetorician Theon.

Despite having written all these works, nothing but isolated fragments survived from the ancient world. His entire work has been lost.

== Critiques ==
According to the Encyclopædia Britannica Eleventh Edition, his surviving writings all show a certain lack of passion, in spite of his keen interest in matters of style, and of political partisanship, except for his enthusiasm for Cyme. According to ancient writers, he was respected as an able and thorough, though somewhat dull historiographer. He was commended for drawing (though not always) a sharp line of demarcation between the mythical and historical; he even recognized that a profusion of detail, though lending corroborative force to accounts of recent events, is ground for suspicion, in reports of far-distant history. His style was high-flown and artificial, as was natural considering his early training, and he frequently sacrificed truth to rhetoric effect. However, according to Dionysius of Halicarnassus, he and Theopompus were the only historical writers whose language was accurate and complete.

== Ephorus and astronomy ==
Ephorus reported that a comet split apart as far back as the winter of 372–373 BC.

The Roman philosopher Seneca the Younger, whose Naturales quaestiones is the ancient source for Ephorus's comet report, is severe in his judgment (7.16):

It requires no great effort to strip Ephorus of his authority; he is a mere chronicler. ... Ephorus is not a person of any scrupulous honour; he is often duped, often he tries to dupe. For example, he asserts that the great comet which, by its rising, sank Helice and Buris, which was carefully watched by the eyes of the whole world since it drew issues of great moment in its train, split up into two stars; but nobody besides him has recorded it. Who, I wonder, could observe the moment at which the comet broke up and was resolved into two parts? And if there is any one who saw it split up into two, how is it that no one saw it first formed out of the two? And why did Ephorus not add the names of the two stars into which it was broken up, since they must have been some of the five planets?
