= Cihat =

Cihat is a Turkish given name for males. It is the Turkish form of the Arabic name and word Jihad ِ(Arabic: جِهاد jihād). People named Cihat include:

== First name ==
- Cihat Arman, Turkish football goalkeeper
- Cihat Bilgehan (1923–1981), Turkish jurist and politician
- Cihat Teğin, Turkish fencer
- Cihat Yaycı (born 1966), Turkish military officer

== Middle name ==
- Hasan Cihat Örter, Turkish guitarist

== See also ==
- SS Cihat (1873) / MV Cihat (1873), a Turkish merchant ship in service 1933-38
