= Mujahid (disambiguation) =

A mujahid is a person engaged in jihad.

Mujahid and variations may refer to:

== Places ==
- Mujahid Colony, a neighborhood of Liaquatabad Town, Karachi, Sindh, Pakistan
- Muslim Mujahid Colony, a neighborhood of Baldia Town, Karachi, Sindh, Pakistan

== People ==
=== Given name ===
- Mujāhid al-ʿĀmirī (died 1044/5), ruler of Dénia in Spain from 1014
- Mujahid Abdul-Karim (born 1944), African-American Islamic scholar and leader
- Mujahid Alam (born 1969), Indian politician
- Mujahid Ali (born 1972), Pakistani politician
- Mujahid Anwar Khan (born 1962), Pakistani Air Force officer
- Mujahid Barelvi, Pakistani journalist
- Mujahid Dokubo-Asari (born 1964), Nigerian-Beninese Ijaw activist
- Mujahid al-Haiqi (born 1992), Yemeni journalist
- Mujahid ibn Jabr (645–722), early Islamic scholar
- Mujahid Jamshed (born 1971), Pakistani cricketer
- Mujahid Kamran (born 1951), Pakistani theoretical physicist
- Mujahid Miski, Somali wanted by the FBI for terrorist activities
- Mujahid Shah (1355/56–1378), ruler of the Bahmani Sultanate
- Mujahid Tareen (born 1949), Pakistani footballer
- Mujahid Yusof Rawa (born 1964), Malaysian politician

=== Surname ===
- Al-Muhtasib al-Mujahid Hamzah (died 1067), Zaidi imam in Yemen 1060–1067
- Abdullah Mujahid (born 1971), Afghan former Guantanamo inmate
- Abu Bakr Ibn Mujāhid (859–936), Persian Islamic scholar
- Al-Mujahid (1173–1240), Ayyubid emir of Homs, 1186–1240
- Alamzeb Mujahid (born 1971), Pakistani comedian
- Basim (singer) (Anis Basim Moujahid, born 1992), Danish singer
- Anwar ul Haq Mujahid (born 1967), Afghan resistance leader
- Dhoruba al-Mujahid bin Wahad (born 1944), American writer and activist
- Fazal Haq Mujahid (1954–1997), Afghan military and political leader
- Jamila Mujahed, Afghan journalist
- Khan Mohammad Mujahid (1961–2011), Afghan police commander
- Mahmoud Abd Al Aziz Abd Al Mujahid (born 1977), Yemeni citizen held at Guantanamo for 14 years
- Mehdi Mujahid (1988–2022), Afghan Hazara uprising leader
- Nabil Moujahid, Danish singer
- Nur ibn Mujahid (died 1567), Emir of Harar, 1550–1567
- Sakhi Dad Mujahid, Afghan insurgent leader
- Zabiullah Mujahid (born 1978), Afghan Taliban spokesman
- Zoltán Mujahid (born 1979), Pakistani-Hungarian singer and voice teacher

== Media ==
- El Moudjahid, an Algerian French-language newspaper
- Mojahed, an Iranian weekly originally published from 1979 to 1981
- Payam-e-Mojahed, an Iranian monthly published from 1972 to 1978

== Other uses ==
- Mujahid (horse) (foaled 1996), a Thoroughbred racehorse and sire

== See also ==
- Mujahideen (disambiguation)
- Jihad (disambiguation)
- Crusader (disambiguation)
