= Crusader =

Crusader or Crusaders most commonly refers to:

- Crusaders, the participants in one of the Crusades, religious wars of the High Middle Ages

Crusader, Crusaders and variations may also refer to:

== Military ==
- Convair NB-36H, an experimental nuclear-powered bomber nicknamed 'The Crusader'
- Crusader tank, a British cruiser tank of World War II
- Crusaders (guerrilla), a Croatian anti-communist guerrilla army
- F-8 Crusader, a U.S. Navy fighter jet
  - XF8U-3 Crusader III, an experimental fighter intended to replace the F-8
- HMS Crusader, three British ships
- Operation Crusader, a British attack in North Africa in the Second World War
- VMFA-122, a US Marine Corps unit (former nickname "Crusaders")
- XM2001 Crusader, an American self-propelled artillery project

== Arts, entertainment, and media ==
=== Music ===
==== Albums ====
- Crusader (Chris de Burgh album), released in 1979
- Crusader (Saxon album), released in 1984
- The Crusader (album), the 2003 debut album by New Zealand rapper Scribe

==== Groups ====
- The Crusaders (jazz fusion group), an American jazz/jazz fusion group, formerly the Jazz Crusaders
- The Crusaders (garage band), a 1960s garage band from Los Angeles who released first Gospel rock record
- The Crusaders, Neil Christian's backing group
- Boston Crusaders Drum and Bugle Corps, a Drum Corps International World Class drum corps
- Oregon Crusaders Drum and Bugle Corps, a DCI Open Class drum corps

=== Films ===
- The Crusaders (1918 film), an Italian film
- The Crusader (1932 film), starring Evelyn Brent
- The Crusaders (2001 film), an Italian television mini-series
- Crusader (film), a 2005 TV movie starring Bo Derek and Andrew McCarthy

=== Fictional characters ===
- Crusader (Dungeons & Dragons), a Dungeons & Dragons character Class
- Crusader (Marvel Comics), two different fictional characters in Marvel Comics
- Crusader, an alias used by a character claiming to be Marvel Boy
- Crusaders (DC Comics), a name used by a team of DC Comics superheroes
- Crusaders (Marvel Comics), a name by a similar team from Marvel Comics
- "The Crusaders", a 1992 DC Comics relaunch of Mighty Crusaders, a comics superhero team

=== Games ===
- Crusader (game series), a 1995 action computer game series
- Crusader: Adventure Out of Time, a 1997 video game
- Stronghold: Crusader, a 2001 computer strategy game

=== Literature ===
- Crusader (Bloor novel), 1999, by Edward Bloor
- Crusader (Sara Douglass novel), a 1999 fantasy novel by Sara Douglass
- The Crusaders, a 1948 bestseller by Stefan Heym
- The Crusaders. An Historical Romance, of the Twelfth Century, an 1820 novel by Louisa Stanhope

=== Periodicals ===
- Crusader, a newspaper of the African Blood Brotherhood
- Crusader, a publication of College of the Holy Cross, Worcester, Massachusetts
- Crusader, a newspaper of The Knights Party
- The New Orleans Crusader, also known as the Crusader and Weekly Crusader, a publication that carried entries from Rodolphe Desdunes

=== Other arts, entertainment, and media ===
- Crusader (TV series), a 1955–1956 adventure/drama television series starring Brian Keith
- "The Crusaders", the initial name of Southern Knights, a comic series started in 1982
- The Crusader (sculpture), a 1931 Lorado Taft sculpture in Chicago's Graceland Cemetery

== Sports ==
=== Athletics teams ===
- Bishop Heelan Catholic High School Crusaders, Sioux City, Iowa
- Belmont Abbey College Crusaders, the athletic teams of Belmont Abbey College, Belmont, North Carolina
- Capital Crusaders, the athletic teams of Capital University, Columbus, Ohio
- Canisius Crusaders, the athletics teams of Canisius High School, Buffalo, New York
- Crusaders, the athletics teams of Chicago's Brother Rice High School
- Holy Cross Crusaders, the athletics teams of College of the Holy Cross
- North Greenville Crusaders, the athletic teams of North Greenville University, Tigerville, South Carolina
- Pensacola Catholic Crusaders, the sports teams of Pensacola Catholic High School
- Riordan Crusaders, the sports teams of Archbishop Riordan High School, San Francisco, California
- Univ. of Dallas Crusaders, the sports teams of the University of Dallas

=== Cricket teams ===
- Kandy Crusaders, a Sri Lankan domestic T20 cricket team

=== Football teams ===
- Amsterdam Crusaders, an American football team from the Netherlands
- Carlstad Crusaders, an American football team from Sweden
- Crusaders F.C., an association football team from Northern Ireland
- Gilford Crusaders F.C., an association football team from Northern Ireland

=== Ice hockey teams ===
- Cleveland Crusaders, a World Hockey Association team from 1972 to 1976

=== Rugby league teams ===
- London Broncos, an English rugby league club once known as London Crusaders
- Crusaders Rugby League, a defunct Welsh rugby league club, formerly the Celtic Crusaders
  - North Wales Crusaders, Phoenix club of the above

=== Rugby union teams ===
- Crusaders (rugby union), a rugby union team from New Zealand, formerly the Canterbury Crusaders
- Western Crusaders, a rugby union team from Fiji

=== Other uses in sports ===
- Crusader (horse) (1923–1940), a US racehorse
- Lucas Oil Crusader, a monster truck currently racing in the Monster Jam professional monster truck racing series

== Transportation ==
=== Civilian aircraft and ships ===
- Crusader (speedboat), the jet speedboat in which John Cobb died
- American Gyro AG-4 Crusader, an aircraft built by the Crusader Aircraft Corporation
- Cessna T303 Crusader, a civilian aircraft
- Short Crusader, a racing seaplane built by Short Brothers

=== Civilian ground vehicles ===
- Crusader (train), a streamlined train which operated between 1937 and 1981
- Crusader, a type of emergency ambulance in widespread use in the UK, originally developed by the St John Ambulance Brigade
- Crusader, a GWR 3031 Class locomotive that was built for and ran on the Great Western Railway between 1891 and 1915

== Other uses ==
- The Crusaders (repeal of alcohol prohibition), a group that promoted repeal of national alcohol prohibition in the U.S.
- Crusaders, the 1906-2006 name of Urban Saints, a Christian youth charity based in the UK

== See also ==
- Crusade (disambiguation)
- Mujahid (disambiguation)
- Mujahideen, participants in jihad ("crusade" or "struggle")
