= Sacred War =

Sacred War may refer to:

- A series of wars carried out by members of the Amphictyonic League:
  - First Sacred War (595–585 BC)
  - Second Sacred War (449–448 BC)
  - Third Sacred War (356–346 BC)
  - Fourth Sacred War (339–338 BC)
- "The Sacred War", Soviet song associated with the Second World War

== See also ==
- Crusade (disambiguation)
- Holy War (disambiguation)
- Jihad (disambiguation)
- Religious conflict (disambiguation)
- War of Religion (disambiguation)
