= Awakening from Abyss =

2017 studio album by Lovebites

Studio album by Lovebites
- Released: October 25, 2017
- Studios: Studio Move 705; Yokota Base Studio; On Air Okubo Studio; CPR Studio; DSW Studio; Mi-ya Studio
- Genre: Power metal
- Length: 60:55
- Label: Victor
- Producer: Steve Jacobs

Lovebites chronology
The Lovebites EP (2017)	Awakening from Abyss (2017)	Battle Against Damnation (2018)

Awakening from Abyss is the debut studio album by Japanese power metal band Lovebites. The album was released on October 25, 2017 in Japan by Victor Entertainment and in North America by Sliptrick Records, and in Europe two days later by JPU Records. It features a total of twelve songs, including re-recordings of those from their debut, The Lovebites EP. Awakening from Abyss reached number 18 on the Oricon chart and number 33 on Billboard Japan.

== Background ==
Having released their debut extended play, The Lovebites EP, in May 2017, Lovebites wasted no time and Awakening from Abyss followed just five months later. From the very beginning of the band, bassist and leader Miho knew she wanted to have English lyrics, and with vocalist Asami having studied abroad, all lyrics on the album are in English. It is their first release with guitarist and keyboardist Mi-ya as a full member of the band.

As their first album, the group knew they wanted to include "Awakening" in its title and tried different words with a "metal taste" such as "steel," but ultimately decided on "From Abyss." Like the EP, it was mixed by Mikko Karmila and mastered by Mika Jussila at Finnvox Studios in Helsinki, Finland. The album cover was conceptualized by Miho and created by The EasyRabbit CreArtions; illustrated by Spanish artist David López Gómez and designed by Gómez and Carlos Vincente León. BraveWords described the cover as "a goddess standing on the ruins of a destroyed world preparing to give birth to a new world" which visualizes the concept of the album. It was also their first cover to feature a wolf, which all subsequent releases have, to symbolize that by playing the non-mainstream genre of heavy metal Lovebites are a "lone wolf" in the music scene.

== Themes ==
Awakening from Abyss includes eight all new tracks plus new recordings and arrangements of all four songs from the band's debut EP, subtitled as "Awakened Versions".

The album opens with the instrumental piece "The Awakening", which was conceived as entrance music for concerts but included as everyone liked it.

Miho referred to "The Hammer of Wrath" as a thrash metal song with some Arabic elements. All of the band members sang the backing chorus together. It is often the opening track of their live setlists, as it helps them to focus their senses.

Mi-ya composed "Shadowmaker" under the influence of "Scandinavian metal." It has five guitar tracks and two bass tracks. Mi-ya and Midori both chose it as their favorite song to play when asked in December 2017, the latter citing its many different elements such as twin guitars.

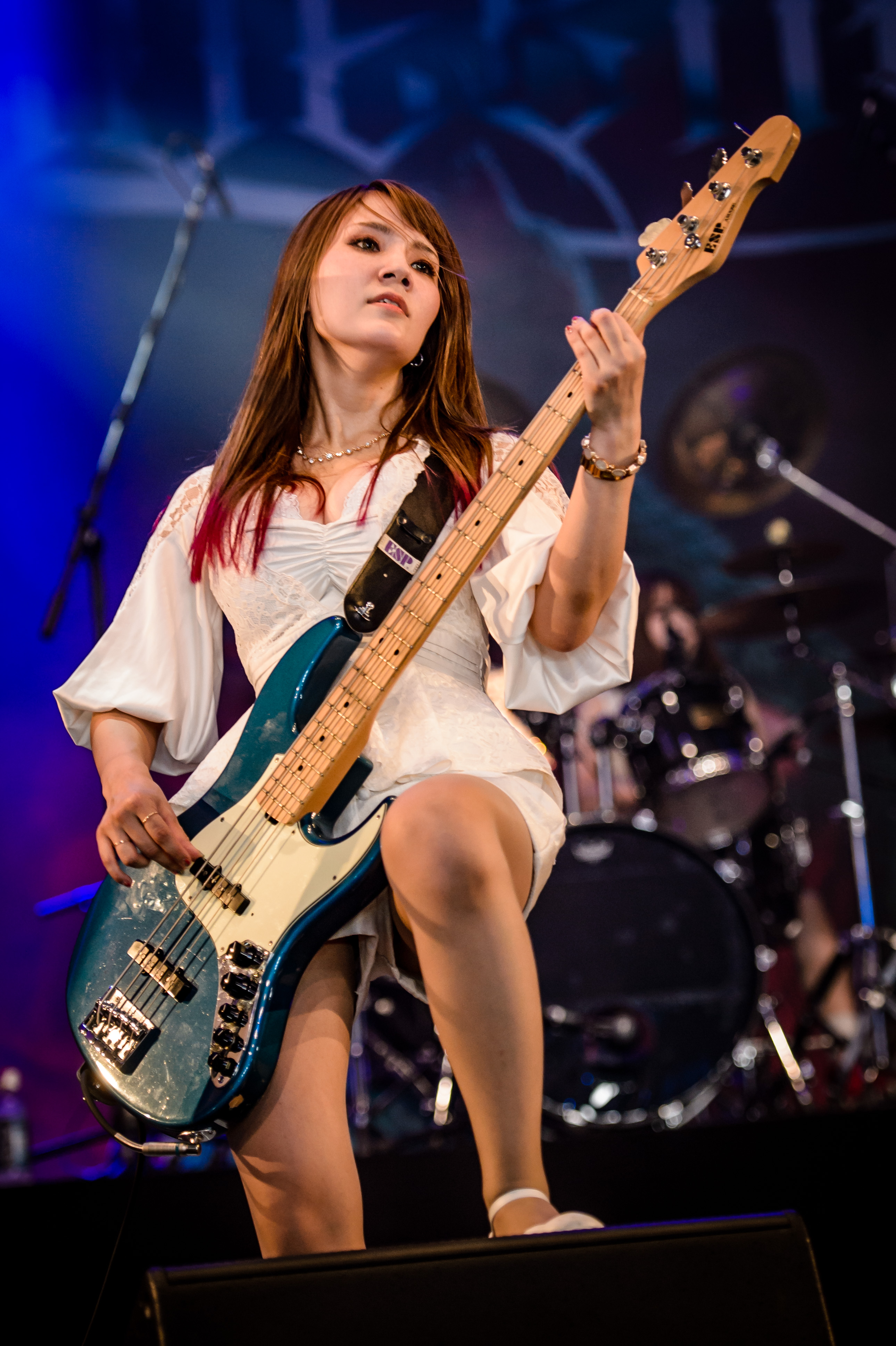
Miho's bass parts are played in the fingerpicking style under the influence of Steve Harris.

For her bass parts on "Scream for Me", Miho was thinking of Anthrax's song "Lone Justice".

"Liar" is a rearrangement of "Just a Liar" by Mi-ya's former band, A Drop of Joker. Although originally a metalcore song, Miho and Asami liked it and Mi-ya thought it would be a waste of a good song as the band broke up. Dr. U, who wrote the lyrics for "Scream for Me" and "Liar", is an American male acquaintance of Mi-ya's who lives in Japan.

"Burden of Time" came about as Miho wanted an Accept-like song that the audience could sing along to. However, its co-composer Mao of the band Light Bringer added a bass phrase that makes it very difficult to play.

When originally writing "The Apocalypse", Miho wanted thrash metal guitar riffs like Sodom. At the suggestion of the producer, Midori played a bottleneck guitar solo for the first time on the track after doing research that included watching Derek Trucks videos on YouTube.

"Inspire" was composed by musician Araken and has a bass solo where Miho was conscious of Iron Maiden's self-titled song.

Miho called "Don't Bite the Dust" the easiest song to listen to on the EP, with its melody balancing the twin guitars and Iron Maiden-like galloping rhythm. It was influenced by and named after a supernatural ability from the Diamond Is Unbreakable arc of the manga and anime series JoJo's Bizarre Adventure. Its ending features a two octave jump by Asami, which she had never tried before.

"Edge of the World" is a ballad composed by Mao that shows off Asami's R&B and soul music roots, but speeds up at the end.

While the EP version of the Haruna-penned song "Bravehearted" was written in Japanese as it was for her and Miho's previous band Destrose, the Awakening from Abyss version is in English.

== Release ==
Awakening from Abyss was released in Japan on October 25, 2017 by Victor Entertainment. In addition to a regular edition, a limited edition includes a DVD of the music videos for "Don't Bite the Dust" and "Shadowmaker". The album was supported by the sold out three-date Awakening from Abyss Tour 2017; Tokyo on November 17, Nagoya on December 6 and Osaka on December 7. The last two marked their first domestic shows outside Tokyo. Victor released a limited edition 2-disc vinyl LP record version of the album, titled Honō no Mesame (炎の目醒め, "Awakening from the Flame") in Japanese, on September 4, 2019 with new liner notes by Masanori Ito.

Sliptrick Records released the album in North America on the same day as its Japanese release. JPU Records released it in the United Kingdom and Europe on October 27, 2017 and included English liner notes for each song, written by each member. In between dates of their Japanese tour, Lovebites performed their first international shows; two nights at Hyper Japan Christmas and one show at Camden Underworld, both in London at the end of November 2017.

== Reception ==
Professional ratings
Review scores
Source	Rating
Classic Rock	3/5 stars
Distorted Sound	8/10
Metal Hammer	3.5/5 stars
Noizze	9/10

Awakening from Abyss reached number 18 on the Oricon Albums Chart and stayed on the chart for four weeks. It peaked at number 33 on Billboard Japan's Hot Albums chart. However, it reached number 22 on Billboard Japan's Top Albums Sales chart, which is based only on physical sales.

Giving the album a near perfect rating of 9/10, Will Marshall of Noizze finished with "Awakening from Abyss is a rare beast in that it is an incredibly accomplished and uniquely enthralling album, especially for a band only on their first outing. The sound is an irresistible combination of classic heavy metal, modern power metal with some symphonic bombast and plenty of thrills that deserves to be heard."

In a positive 8/10 review, Distorted Sound's Lotty Whittingham called the album "an interesting portfolio of high energy, empowering and brilliantly structured melodies that will cause chaos and mayhem within the crowds of their live shows" and made several comparisons to Battle Beast.

Sophie Maughan of Metal Hammer likened the album to Iron Maiden as well as Perfect Man-era Rage, giving it three and a half stars. She praised "Shadowmaker" as an "assault of windmill-inducing ferocity meshing unencumbered shred and relentless bass rumbles" and "Liar" for its "weighty grooves, catchy hooks and anthemic choruses", but noted songs such as "Edge of the World" blend together and "become exhaustingly dramatic."

Giving the album three out of five stars, Classic Rock wrote that "All the hallmarks of elite power metal are here: soaring vocals, speed metal played with alarming finesse, and plenty of bullshit about ‘hammers of wrath’ and living forever at the edge of the world."

== Track listing ==
Awakening from Abyss track listing
No.	Title	Lyrics	Music	Arrangement	Length
1.	"The Awakening"		Mi-ya	Lovebites, Mi-ya	2:04
2.	"The Hammer of Wrath"	Miho	Miho, Mao	Lovebites, Mao	4:41
3.	"Warning Shot"	Asami	Mi-ya	Lovebites, Mi-ya	4:03
4.	"Shadowmaker"	Asami	Mi-ya	Lovebites, Mi-ya	5:42
5.	"Scream for Me (Awakened Version)"	Dr. U	Mi-ya	Lovebites, Mi-ya	6:12
6.	"Liar"	Dr. U	Mi-ya	Lovebites, Mi-ya	6:03
7.	"Burden of Time"	Miho	Miho, Mao	Lovebites, Mao	4:46
8.	"The Apocalypse (Awakened Version)"	Miho	Miho, Mao	Lovebites, Mao	4:59
9.	"Inspire"	Asami	Araken	Araken	5:20
10.	"Don't Bite the Dust (Awakened Version)"	Miho	Miho, Mao	Lovebites, Mao	4:12
11.	"Edge of the World"	Asami	Mao	Lovebites, Mao	6:43
12.	"Bravehearted (Awakened Version)"	Asami, Haruna	Haruna	Lovebites, Mi-ya	6:10
Total length:					60:55

== Personnel ==
Lovebites

- Haruna – drums
- Miho – bass
- Midori – guitars
- Mi-ya – guitars and keyboards
- Asami – vocals

Other

- Mao – keyboards and programming
- Steve Jacobs – production
- Mikko Karmila – mixing
- Mika Jussila – mastering

== Charts ==
Chart performance of Awakening from Abyss
Chart (2017)	Peak position
Japan Hot Albums (Billboard)	33
Japanese Albums (Oricon)	18
