= Mujahideen (disambiguation) =

Mujahideen (Arabic: مجاهدين mujāhidīn) is the plural of mujahid, one engaged in jihad.

Mujahideen, or variant spellings, may also refer to:

- Afghan mujahideen
- Afghanistan Mujahedin Freedom Fighters Front
- Army of Mujahideen, Syria
- Bosnian mujahideen
- Chechen mujahideen
- East Indonesia Mujahideen
- Harkat-ul-Mujahideen, Pakistan
- Hizbul Mujahideen, Pakistan
- Indian Mujahideen
- Islamic Unity of Afghanistan Mujahideen
- Kurdish Mujahideen
- Ministry of Mujahideen or Minister of War Veterans (Moudjahidine) and Rights Holders in the Cabinet of Algeria
- Mujahideen Army (Iraq)
- Mujahedeen KOMPAK, Indonesia
- People's Mujahedin of Iran
- Sinai Mujahideen

== See also ==
- Mujahid (disambiguation)
- Mujahideen Shura Council (disambiguation)
- Al-Shabaab (militant group), or Harakat al-Shabaab al-Mujahideen
