= Ibn al-Nahhas al-Dimashqi al-Dumyati =

Islamic scholar

Personal life
- Born: Aḥmad b. Ibrāhīm b. Muḥammad al-Dimashqī al-Dumyāṭī
- Died: 1411 CE Egypt
- Main interest(s): Islamic Jurisprudence, Jihad
- Notable work: Mashari al-Ashwaq ila Masari al-Ushaaq (Kitab ul Jihad)

Religious life
- Religion: Islam
- Denomination: Sunni

Aḥmad b. Ibrāhīm b. Muḥammad al-Dimashqī al-Dumyāṭī, commonly known as Ibn al-Naḥḥās al-Dimashqī al-Dumyāṭī (Arabic: ابن النحّاس الدمشقي الدمياطي; died 1411), was an Islamic scholar and a mujahid who was killed fighting the Byzantine army. His birth was not known. At the time of death he was in Egypt.

Al-sakhawi writes, "He strove in doing good, and preferred obscurity, he did not become proud because of his knowledge, on the contrary maybe those who did not know him would think him to be a commoner, with his pleasant appearance, beautiful beard, stocky and even body, he participated much in Ribat and Jihad until he was martyred".

In modern times, he has been cited by members of the Salafi movement for the justification of Jihad.

Abdullah Yusuf Azzam who is commonly noted as being responsible for the revival of jihad in the twentieth century, referred to Ibn al-Nahhas' most famous piece of work as the best books he has read.

Pakistani jihadist Masood Azhar has written a 850-page commentary on his Mashāriʻal-Ashwāq ilʹa-Maṣariʻ al-ʻUshshāq.

== Most famous work ==
1. Mashari al-Ashwaq ila Masari al-Ushaaq.
2. Kitab ul Jihad.
