= Islamic Jihad =

Islamic Jihad may refer to:

- Types of Islamic Jihad
- Jihad, the Islamic theological concept, literally meaning "struggle"
- Jihadism, a neologism for militant Islamic movements
- Islam and war
- Islamic Jihad Organization, defunct group active in Lebanon 1983-1992, precursor to Hezbollah
- Islamic Jihad Union, al-Qaeda affiliate active in Afghanistan and Pakistan since 2005
- Islamic Jihad of Yemen, defunct al-Qaeda affiliate active in Yemen 2008
- Military career of Muhammad
- List of expeditions of Muhammad
- Egyptian Islamic Jihad, al-Qaeda affiliate active in Egypt since the late 1970s
- Palestinian Islamic Jihad, group active in Gaza since 1981
- Turkish Islamic Jihad, group active in Turkey 1991-1996, now probably defunct

== See also ==
- Jihad (disambiguation)
