= Benjamin Scheuer =

American stage actor (born 1982)

- Born: May 10, 1982 (age 44)
- Occupations: Songwriter; Performer
- Years active: 2014–present
- Website: https://www.benjaminscheuer.com/

Benjamin Scheuer (born 10 May 1982) is an American songwriter, guitarist, and singer, based in London and New York City.

== Career ==
=== Stage ===
Benjamin Scheuer wrote and performed The Lion, a one-man autobiographical musical. The Lion premiered off-Broadway in 2014 at the Manhattan Theatre Club, directed by Sean Daniels. Later that year, Scheuer performed the show at London's St James Theatre, receiving the 2014 Offie for Best New Musical. Scheurer returned the show to off-Broadway, receiving the 2015 Drama Desk Award for Outstanding Solo Performance. It has since enjoyed critically acclaimed runs at theatres around the United States. The Los Angeles Times writes that in The Lion, "the vibe of casual, unrehearsed immediacy masks the narrative complexity of a novel or an opera," and that Scheuer "plays guitar as if he invented the instrument."

In 2015 The Huffington Post called The Lion "The best new musical this year." The show's first version, called The Bridge, ran in the 2013 Edinburgh Fringe Festival. Scheuer has given more than 500 performances of The Lion at theatres including DC's Arena Stage, San Francisco's ACT, Portland Center Stage in Oregon, The Williamstown Theatre Festival, and San Diego's The Old Globe. Scheuer gave the final performance of The Lion at The Geffen Playhouse in Los Angeles on February 19, 2017.

The Lion was produced at the Southwark Playhouse in London spring/summer 2022, with Max Alexander-Taylor performing the role of BEN. The production was directed by Alex Stenhouse and Sean Daniels. This production, still featuring Alexander-Taylor, had additional productions in Arizona and Cincinnati, USA.

A Mountain for Elodie, Scheuer's follow-up to The Lion, premiered at the 2023 Edinburgh Fringe Festival, performed by Scheuer and directed by Olivier Award-winning Polly Findlay. Called "Remarkable, beautiful, funny, heartbreaking" by the BBC and "a wonderful treat... make sure to bring tissues when you see A Mountain for Elodie. If you're anything like me, you will need one from all the tears of joy" by Playbill.

In 2022, The Old Vic in London commissioned and produced Scheuer's piece "Water from Dust," as part of their WHOSE PLANET ARE YOU ON series.

In 2007 Jihad! The Musical, for which Scheuer wrote the music and lyrics, was performed at the Edinburgh Fringe, and in 2010 it transferred to Jermyn Street Theatre in London.

Benjamin Scheuer has a degree in English from Harvard. He is an alumnus of the Johnny Mercer Songwriting Workshop, and has been writer-in-residence at the Goodspeed Opera House, The O'Neill Theatre Center, The Weston Playhouse, and Williamstown Theatre Festival.

Scheuer toured the UK with Mary Chapin Carpenter in 2014, and has performed at such venues as the Royal Albert Hall in London and New York's Lincoln Center.

=== Music videos ===
'Empty Stage', made in collaboration with ballet dancer Carlos Acosta and the Birmingham Royal Ballet, was released on February 19, 2021. Directed by Rosie Anderson and Josh Ben-Tovim of IMPERMANENCE, and starring Acosta, the piece is a "dazzling short film -- and dance lover's dream" says The Huffington Post.

Robbie Fairchild, a principal dancer at New York City Ballet, directed and choreographed his own dance film to the song "Empty Stage." It was released in April 2021.Watch it here.

I Am Samantha was released on March 31, 2020, to coincide with International Transgender Day of Visibility. The video features a cast of 27 transgender performers, including Monica Helms, and is directed by T Cooper. Scheuer wrote the song for his friend Samantha Williams, a transgender woman.

'Lafayette Square' was released in October 2020. Scheuer and director Chris Gavin created the piece in response to the police violence against the Black Lives Matter demonstrators in Washington DC in June 2020.

In February 2019, Scheuer released a lyric-video for his song 'Hibernate With Me', with artwork from his children's-book of the same title.

Working with Academy Award-winning director/animator Peter Baynton, Scheuer has produced animated music videos for the songs Weather The Storm, The Lion Cookie-tin Banjo, Hello Jemima, and Cure, "Cure" follows a body as it deals with cancer and chemotherapy. The video, according to the NYTimes, "depicts the chemicals striking like lightning, as if to shock the body or map it with bombed roadways, tracking a jagged terrain. The speed of the tattooing brings to mind the words "invasive" and "systemic." We are looking at a representation of cancer treatment, but the video evokes terror at the disease's malevolent capacity to spread quickly."

Baynton's five videos have featured at various international animation and children's film festivals, and have won awards at the Annecy Film Festival, The British Animation Awards, The Crystal Palace Festival, and the Encounters Film Festival.

=== Music releases ===
"Empty Stage" was released alongside a short film, on February 19, 2021, by Atlantic Records/ Parlophone. The film was made with ballet dancer Carlos Acosta and the Birmingham Royal Ballet. Scheuer recorded the song with the Royal Ballet Sinfonia orchestra. Scheuer co-produced the track with Grammy Award-winning Robin Baynton (Taylor Swift/Coldplay.) The British Theatre Guide says "What a poignant punch Empty Stage packs, words and images defying the times—that's the power of the arts for you. Do fairy tales come true?"

"I Am Samantha" was released, alongside a music video, on March 31, 2020, by Atlantic Records. Scheuer wrote the song for a transgender friend of his. The music-video was directed by T Cooper, who is transgender, and features a cast of 27, all of whom are transgender.

Scheuer released the songs "Hibernate With Me" and "Hundred Feet Tall" in 2019 & 2020 to coincide with the release of his children's books of the same names.

In April 2018, Scheuer's songs "Hello Jemima" and "Silent Giants" were released digitally, and as a limited-edition 7" vinyl, with artwork by Jemima Williams (Scheuer's wife, about whom the song "Hello Jemima" was written.) (ADA/Paper Music.)

Scheuer's debut album "Songs from THE LION" was released on June 3, 2016 (ADA/Paper Music.) Produced by Geoff Kraly, the album features Scheuer on guitar and vocals; drummer Josh Freese, drummer Josh Dion, vocalist Jean Rohe, bass player Chris Morrissey, with Kraly programming synthesers and also playing bass. The album was engineered and mixed by Pat Dillett, with additional mixing by Kevin Killen. The album's liner notes are written by Mary Chapin Carpenter.

=== Books ===
Scheuer has written two children's picture-books, Hundred Feet Tall and Hibernate With Me, both illustrated by Scheuer's wife, Jemima Williams. Both books have been published in English, French, and German, and "Hundred Feet Tall" has additionally been published in Welsh.

In 2011 Scheuer, who was at the time twenty-eight years old, was diagnosed with – and successfully treated for – stage IV Hodgkin lymphoma. Seeking to gain some control and with the ethos of creating art from all aspects of life, Scheuer and photographer Riya Lerner undertook a photographic project documenting his year of chemotherapy. Along with diary excerpts and quotes, the 27 black-and-white photographs have been made into a book, Between Two Spaces, with 50% of proceeds going to the Leukemia & Lymphoma Society. Scheuer was nominated as the LLS's 2018 Man of the Year in New York City.

On June 7, 2016, Lerner and Scheuer hosted a one-day exhibition of the photographs at the Leslie Lohman Prince Street Gallery in New York City. The New York Times wrote: "The youthful vulnerability of Benjamin Scheuer makes both the video [Cure] and the photographs moving....The poignancy of Mr. Scheuer's and Ms. Lerner's images arises from the implacable effect that estranging clinical spaces impose on previously secure domestic places."

Scheuer has been a guest speaker CSU Long Beach Medical School and San Diego University's Medical School on the topic of "Making Good Things Out of Bad Things". Scheuer spoke at the TEDxBroadway conference on the same topic.

=== Awards ===
Scheuer received the 2021 Kleban Award for Lyrics, the 2015 Drama Desk Award for Outstanding Solo Performance, a 2015 Theatre World Award for The Lion, the 2014 Offie for Best Musical, the 2013 ASCAP Foundation Cole Porter Award for songwriting, and the 2013 Musical Theatre Network Award for Best Lyrics. Scheuer has been nominated for a 2017 Helen Hayes Award, a 2015 Lucile Lortel Award and two 2015 Outer Critics Circle Awards, as well as the 2015 Drama Desk Award for Best Lyrics.

== Personal ==
Scheuer is married to Welsh illustrator Jemima Williams. The two met at the 2014 British Animation Awards.
