= Crusade Records =

- Founded: 2005
- Founder: Tom Vernette
- Distributor(s): Modern Music (2005-2008) in-house (2008-present)
- Genre: Metalcore, Rock
- Country of origin: Australia
- Location: Haymarket, New South Wales
- Official website: Crusade's site

Crusade Records is an independent record label based in Sydney, Australia. Founded in 2005, the label houses Australian and international bands in metal, hardcore and rock genres. The label has, in its existence, signed Through Closed Eyes, The Valley, The Mission in Motion, Freestate, and The Rabble. The label has also put out releases, under licence from respective labels, by Bring Me The Horizon, Deadsoil, Trivium, and Drop Dead, Gorgeous. In 2008, due to the closure of Modern Music, the label has been without distribution. The label is currently doing In-House Distribution.

== Current artists ==
- The Rabble

== Releases ==
- The Rabble – The Battle's Almost Over
- Freestate – Surrender
- The Mission in Motion – The Window
- Bloodlined Calligraphy – Ypsilanti
- The Valley – Burning at the Mistake
- Drop Dead, Gorgeous - In Vogue
- The Valley – A Small Misunderstanding Leads to Disaster
- Deadsoil – The Venom Divine
- Trivium – Ember to Inferno
- Bring Me the Horizon – This Is What the Edge of Your Seat Was Made For
- Through Closed Eyes – With Every Breath

== See also ==
- List of record labels
