= Jihad (name) =

Jihad (Arabic: جهاد jihād, [d͡ʒɪˈhæːd, ɡeˈhæːd] 'striving' or 'struggling for something better or greater') is used as a given name. People with the name Jihad, Jihaad, or Jehad include:

== Known name ==
- Abu Jihad, teknonym of Khalil al-Wazir, (1935–1988), Palestinian politician, founder of Fatah

== Jihad ==
- Jihad Al-Atrash (born 1943), Lebanese actor
- Jihad Azour, Lebanese politician
- Jihad Benchlikha (born 1992), Moroccan basketball player
- Jihad Dib (born 1973), Australian politician
- Jihad Ahmed Jibril (1961–2002), assassinated son of Ahmed Jibril
- Jihad Khodr (born 1983), Brazilian surfer
- Jihad Makdissi, Syrian government spokesman
- Jihad Mughniyah, Hezbollah head of security
- Jihad Qassab (1975–2016), Syrian footballer
- Jihad Ward (born 1994), American football player
- Jihad Zoghbi, Syrian actor
- Jihaad Campbell (born 2004), American football player

== Jehad ==
- Jehad Al Baour (born 1987), Syrian footballer
- Jehad Al-Hussain (born 1982), Syrian footballer
- Jehad Muntasser (born 1978), Libyan footballer
- Jehad Al-Zowayed (born 1989), Saudi footballer
- Naziruddin Jehad (1969–1990), Bangladeshi political activist

== Middle name ==
- Mohammad Jihad al-Laham, Syrian politician
