= Dharamyudh =

Dharamyudh may refer to:

- Dharma-yuddha, term for just war in Hinduism
- Dharamyudh (Sikhism), a similar term in Sikhism
- Dharmayudham, a 1973 Indian film in Malayalam
- Dharma Yuddham, a 1979 Indian film in Tamil
- Dharamyudh (film), a 1988 Indian Bollywood film in Hindi
- Dharmayutham, a 2012–13 Indian soap opera in Tamil
- Dharmayuddhaya, a 2017 Sri Lankan film in Sinhala
- Dharam Yudh Morcha, Sikh revolutionary protest movement during the early 1980s
  - Dharam Yudh Morcha (film), a 2016 Indian film in Punjabi about the 1980s Sikh movement

== See also ==
- Dharma (disambiguation)
- Yudh (disambiguation)
- Holy war (disambiguation)
