= Jihad Zoghbi =

Syrian actor and voice actor

- جهاد الزغبي
- Occupations: Actor, voice actor
- Spouse: Doha Al-Debs

Jihad Al-Zoghbi (Arabic: جهاد الزغبي) is a Syrian actor and voice actor.

== Filmography ==
=== Dubbing roles ===
- Dinosaur - Kron
- Over the Garden Wall - Narrator
