= Al Gihad =

Al Gihad الجهاد
- Village
- Location in Libya
- Coordinates: 32°34′22.4″N 21°29′5.42″E
- Country: Libya
- Region: Cyrenaica
- District: Jabal al Akhdar
- Time zone: UTC+2

Al Gihad (Arabic: الجهاد) is a village in the District of Jabal al Akhdar in north-eastern Libya. It's located 50 km southwest of Bayda.

== See also ==
- List of cities in Libya
