= Mujahideen Shura Council =

Mujahideen Shura Council may refer to:

- Mujahideen Shura Council (Iraq)
- Mujahideen Shura Council in the Environs of Jerusalem (Egypt, Gaza)
- Mujahideen Shura Council (Syria)
- Mujahideen Shura (North Waziristan), Pakistan
