= The Valley (band) =

Australian musical group

- Origin: Sydney, New South Wales, Australia
- Genres: Alternative rock; post-hardcore
- Years active: 2005–2007
- Label: Crusade
- Past members: Pete Campbell; Simon French; Tim Glastonbury; Tom Muller; Shaun Pretorious; Scott Tarasenko; James Taylor
- Website: thevalleymusic.com

The Valley were an Australian alternative rock quintet, which formed in 2005. They signed to Crusade Records late that year and released their debut extended play, A Small Misunderstanding Leads to Disaster, in February 2006. Their second EP, Burning at the Mistake, was released in late 2006.

The Valley toured internationally with the Bleeders, I Killed the Prom Queen, Gyroscope, Horsell Common, Behind Crimson Eyes, Carpathian and the Hot Lies. The band were the support act for Anberlin on their 2006 Australian-New Zealand tour, and the support act for Underoath on their June 2007 Australian tour. The Valley disbanded in December of that year.

== History ==
The Valley were formed in Sydney, as an alternative rock quintet, in early 2005 with Pete Campbell on guitars, Simon French on vocals, Tim Glastonbury on drums and percussion, Tom Muller on guitars and Shaun Pretorious on bass guitar. The group signed with Crusade Records late that year, which released their debut extended play, A Small Misunderstanding Leads to Disaster, in February 2006. Its five tracks had been recorded in the previous May to June at Mangrove Studios, Gosford, with Blair Simmons producing, engineering and mixing. By the time the EP appeared Campbell and French had left with Pretorious switching to guitar; they hired Scott Tarasenko on vocals and James Taylor on bass guitar.

dB Magazine's Fiona Stafford caught their gig in Adelaide in July 2006, she described how they "jumped on the stage and showed everyone what they have been doing for the last two-and-a-half months. Surely enough they do it well" and called the experience "truly breath-taking... this quintet is just getting better and better at doing: playing live."

Following the tour, the Valley recorded their second EP, Burning at the Mistake, at Kingtone Studios in August and September 2006, with Pete King producing and engineering. It was released in November and debuted at No. 12 on the Australian Independent Singles Chart, staying in the top 20 for two weeks. The group headlined their first national tour with the Amity Affliction and appeared at Soundfest 2006 in Canberra with From Autumn to Ashes, the Bled and Parkway Drive.

The Valley left Crusade Records and Modern Music Sony BMG. They travelled to the United States in June 2007 to showcase to record labels. Upon return to Australia in December of that year the band announced their dissolution.

== Members ==
- Pete Campbell – guitars (2005–06)
- Simon French – vocals (2005–06)
- Tim Glastonbury – drums, percussion (2005–07)
- Tom Muller – guitars (2005–07)
- Shaun Pretorious – bass guitar, guitar (2005–07)
- Scott Tarasenko – vocals (2006–07)
- James Taylor – bass guitar (2006–07)

== Discography ==
=== Extended plays ===
- A Small Misunderstanding Leads to Disaster (20 February 2006) Crusade Records
- Burning at the Mistake (18 November 2006) Crusade Records
