= Mojahed (newspaper) =

Persian-English political publication (1979–1981)

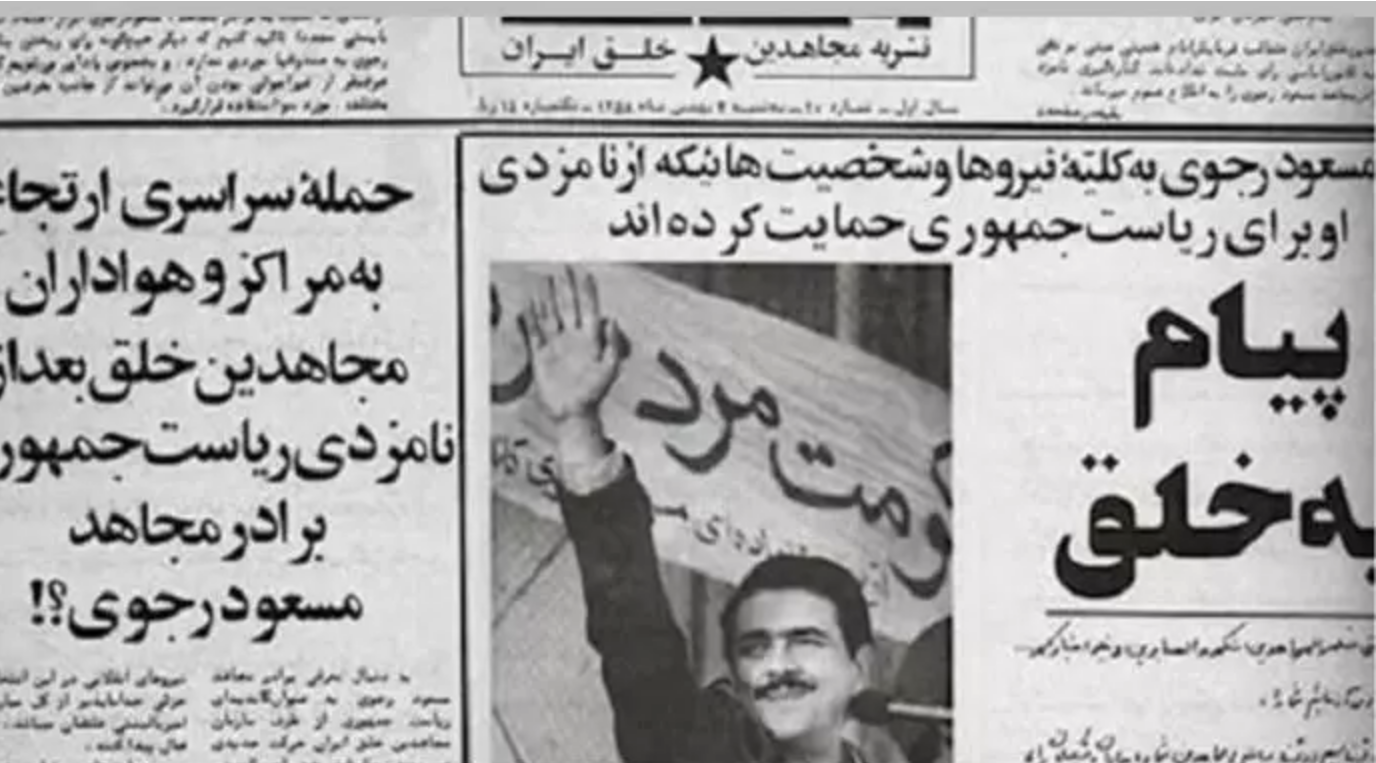
- Mujahed (newspaper) - year 1980
- Type: Weekly
- Format: Tabloid
- Launched: 23 July 1979
- Ceased publication: 30 June 1981
- Relaunched: 2 December 1982; 43 years ago
- Political alignment: People's Mujahedin of Iran
- Language: Persian; English
- Country: Iran
- Sister newspapers: Iran Liberation; Iran Zamin (1995–98)
- OCLC number: 52053082
- Free online archives: University of Manchester Library (1979–81); Iranian Opposition Archive (1979–84; 2005–07); Mojahed (Persian: مجاهد, romanized: Mujāhid, lit. 'The [holy] warrior') is the official newspaper of the People's Mujahedin of Iran (MEK), first printed in 1979 on a weekly basis. The newspaper published its last issue inside Iran on 30 June 1981 and after a hiatus resumed publication in exile on 2 December 1982.

Mojahed (Persian: مجاهد, romanized: Mujāhid, lit. 'The [holy] warrior') is the official newspaper of the People's Mujahedin of Iran (MEK), first printed in 1979 on a weekly basis. The newspaper published its last issue inside Iran on 30 June 1981 and after a hiatus resumed publication in exile on 2 December 1982.

== History ==
Mojahed staff spent months to prepare for launching it, before it was first published in late July 1979. The paper was used to publicize the MEK's political campaigns and programs. While trying to suppress the MEK, the Iranian regime banned the Mojahed on 2 November 1980 on orders of the Chief Prosecutor who said the paper was "spreading slanderous lies". However, it continued to print via clandestine printing press and was distributed underground. According to Dilip Hiro, the newspaper sold about 30,000 copies by mid-1981. Ervand Abrahamian said that Mojahed's circulation had surpassed Jomhouri-e Eslami of the Islamic Republican Party and reached 500,000 around the same time.

After exile, the MEK established printing presses both in Europe and North America and in December 1982, the newspaper reappeared. In 1983, Mojahed became available throughout an international network in several capitals and in some issues contained over seventy newsprint pages. Members of the MEK were encouraged to read the publication in their spare time. As of 2000, the newspaper continued publication for the MEK's cadre.

In June 2003, French police raided the MEK in France and also banned publications of the Mojahed. Group members denied any wrongdoing and accused French intelligence of working with the Iranian government to tarnish the group.

== Content ==
Ervand Abrahamian said that the MEK used the Mojahed paper to move "the issue of democracy to centre stage" and to accuse the Iranian regime, which it described as a "dictatorship of mullahs", of "betraying the Islamic Revolution".

Anthony Hyman identified the newspaper as being "devoted to the personality cult of Masud Rajavi, the leader of this authoritarian party".
