= Holy War (Toto song) =

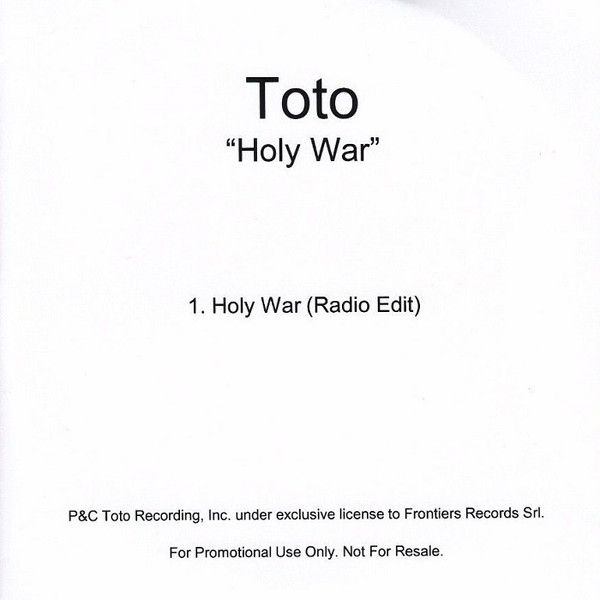
- European promotional cover

Single by Toto

from the album Toto XIV
- Released: February 17, 2015
- Genre: Hard rock
- Length: 4:03
- Label: Frontiers
- Songwriters: Steve Lukather; Jeffery CJ Vanston; Joseph Williams
- Producers: Steve Lukather; David Paich; Jeffery CJ Vanston; Joseph Williams

Toto singles chronology
"Orphan" (2015)	"Holy War" (2015)	"Burn" (2015)

"Holy War" is a song by the American rock band Toto. It was released as the second single from the band's 2015 album, Toto XIV. Joseph Williams and Steve Lukather share lead vocals on the song and co-wrote it with Jeffery CJ Vanston.

== Background ==
According to Lukather, the song's lyrical content pertains to acts of violence carried out in the name of religion. "It's a comment on the way some of us are using God as an excuse to kill people. The first commandment is 'Thou Shall Not Kill' [sic]. There's no asterisk by the side saying 'Except in certain circumstances'". Williams stated that the opening lines of the song rebuked news coverage that he deemed sensationalist and responsible for instilling fear amongst the public.

Lukather developed the melody to the song's chorus and Williams wrote the "holy war" lyrics to accompany this section; Williams recalled that these were the first lyrics that came to mind when generating suitable ideas for the chorus.

"Holy War" was originally recorded with drums, guitar, and bass. The bass was originally played by Leland Sklar using his fingers, "which just sounded huge" according to Steve Porcaro. The band made the executive decision to replace Sklar's bass track with a new part played with a pick in an effort to open up some space in the track to allow for other musical ideas. Porcaro contributed some keyboard ideas that were later scrapped, including a string-line on verse two and a synth solo. Porcaro played a Yamaha CS-80 Yamaha DX1 and Yamaha CS-80 for brass stabs, and he used a ribbon controller on the CS-80 to oscillate the pitch of the instrument. This keyboard was doubled with a Logic ES2 synth, "which has this great pitch-bend range that’ll go down three, four, or five octaves" according to Porcaro.

== Credits ==
=== Toto ===
- Keith Carlock – drums
- Steve Lukather – lead and background vocals, guitars
- David Paich – organ, piano
- Steve Porcaro – synths
- Joseph Williams – lead and background vocals

=== Additional musicians ===
- Lenny Castro – percussion
- David Hungate – bass
- Jeffery CJ Vanston – additional keyboards

== Releases ==
- CD, Single, Promo, Sampler, Stereo – Frontiers Records, Scandinavia 2015.
