= MV Rahmi Kaptan =

1873 ship

History
- Name: Honfleur (1873–1911); Chrysallis (1911); Chrysalis (1911–16); Fauvette (1916–18); Fauvette I (1918–24); Ihsanie (1924–25); Aidin (1924–28); Aydin (1928–33); Cihat (1933–38); Demirhisar (1938–85); Rahmi Kaptan (1985–c.2005)
- Owner: London and South Western Railway (1873–1910); S Galbraith (1910–11); Navigation à Vapeur Ionienne (1911–17); French Navy (1917–20); Société des Pêcheries à Vapeur(1920–21); Douglas & Partners (1921–25); Mustafa Cemal Seyr-i Sefain Idaresi (1925–27); Moustafa Zeki & Mahmut Beyler (1927–29); Haci Ali & Mahmut Beyler (1929–31); Muratzade Mahmud Nedim Bey (1931–38); Mehmet Kasim Basak (1938–73); Ahmet Basak & Ortaklari (1973–85); Rahmi Yagci (1985–c.2005)
- Operator: Owner operated except:-; G Yannoulis Frères (1911–17); Courou & Roussel (1920–21)
- Port of registry: (United Kingdom of Great Britain and Ireland) Southampton, United Kingdom (1873–1911); (Kingdom of Greece) Argostoli, Greece (1911–17); French Navy (1917–20); Marseille, France (1920–25); Istanbul, Turkey (1925–c.2005)
- Route: Southampton - Channel Islands - France (1873–1911)
- Builder: Aitken & Mansel
- Yard number: 68
- Launched: 20 November 1873
- Completed: February 1874
- Maiden voyage: 16 February 1874
- In service: 13 February 1874
- Identification: United Kingdom Official Number 68827 (1873–1911); Code Letters HBCS (1933); Code Letters TCAV (1934–c.2005); IMO number: 5088447 (1960s–c.2005)
- Fate: Scrapped

General characteristics
- Type: Passenger/cargo ship (1873–1917, 1920-c.2005); Patrol vessel (1917–1920)
- Tonnage: 426 GRT, 325 NRT (as built)
- Length: 176 feet 4 inches (53.75 m) (1873–1935)
- Beam: 24 feet 1 inch (7.34 m) (1873–1935)
- Depth: 12 feet 3 inches (3.73 m) (1873–1935)
- Installed power: 2-cylinder compound steam engine 110 nhp (1873–88); Triple expansion steam engine 149 nhp (1888–1936); Diesel engine (1936–c.2005)
- Propulsion: Single screw propeller

Rahmi Kaptan was a ship that was built in 1873 as Honfleur by Aitken & Mansel, Glasgow for the London and South Western Railway. She was sold to Greece in 1911 and renamed Chrysallis then Chrysalis. She was sold to the French Navy in 1917 and served as the patrol vessel Fauvette, later Fauvette I. In 1924, she was sold to Turkey and renamed Ihsanie. She operated for a number of Turkish owners under the names Aidin, Aydin, Cihat, Demirhisar and Rahmi Kaptan, serving until c.2005.

== Description ==
As built, the ship was 176 feet 4 inches (53.75 m) long, with a beam of 24 feet 1 inch (7.34 m) and a depth of 12 feet 3 inches (3.73 m). She was powered by a two-cylinder compound steam engine which had cylinders of 26 inches (66 cm) and 52 inches (130 cm) diameter by 30 inches (76 cm) stroke. It was located midships. The engine was built by Rait and Lindsay, Glasgow. It was rated at 110nhp. She was assessed at 426 GRT, 325 NRT.

== History ==
Honfleur was built as yard number 68 by Aitken & Mansel, Glasgow for the London and South Western Railway (LSWR). She was launched on 20 November 1873. Registered on 13 February 1874, the United Kingdom Official Number 68827 was allocated. Her port of registry was Southampton. She was built for the Southampton - Channel Islands - France route. Her maiden voyage was on 16 February 1874 from Southampton to Le Havre, Seine-Maritime, France.

On 16 February 1875, Honfleur assisted in the rescue of the surviving passengers and crew of the LSWR ship Havre, which ran aground on the Platte Boue Rock, off Guernsey, Channel Islands. On 3 December 1879, she collided with the pier at Saint Helier, Jersey, injuring a passenger. In 1888, her engine was replaced with a triple expansion steam engine which had cylinders of 19.5 inches (50 cm), 31 inches (79 cm) and 51 inches (130 cm) diameter by 33 inches (84 cm) stroke. Rated at 149nhp, it was built by J & J Thomson, Glasgow.

On 6 September 1890, Honfleur ran aground at Foreland, Isle of Wight. She was refloated later that day and completed her voyage from Cherbourg, Seine-Maritime, France to Southampton. On 15 October 1891, she fell in with the Dutch steamship Prince Phillipe, which had lost her rudder off Beachy Head, Sussex, but was unable to render any assistance due to the weather. Honfleur assisted in the search for survivors from the LSWR ship Stella, which was wrecked on the Casquets on 30 March 1899.

In 1907, she was reboilered, with a boiler from Alma being fitted. She made her last voyage under LSWR ownership on 18 March 1910. Honfleur was sold to S. Galbraith, Glasgow. She was sold the next year to Navigation à Vapeur "Ionienne", Argostoli, Greece and was operated under the management of G Yannoulatos Frères. She was renamed Chrysallis and then Chrysalis.

In 1916, she was sold to the French Navy and renamed Fauvette, entering service as a patrol vessel in 1917. She was renamed Fauvette I in 1918 and was sold in 1920 to the Société Pêcheries à Vapeur, Marseille and operated under the management of Courou & Roussel. The Société Pêcheries à Vapeur sold her the next year to Douglas & Partners, Paris.

In 1924, she was renamed Ihsanie. She was sold to Mustafa Cemal Seyr-i Sefain Idaresi, Istanbul in 1925, and renamed Aidin. She was sold in 1927 to Moustafa Zeki & Mahmut Beyler. She was renamed Aydin in 1928. She was sold again in 1929 to Haci Ali & Mahmud Beyler. In 1931, she was sold to Muratzade Mahmud Nedim Bey and was renamed Cihat in 1933. The Code Letters HBCS were allocated. These were changed to TCAV in 1934. In 1935, she was rebuilt and a new diesel engine was fitted aft. She was sold in 1938 to Mehmet Kasim Basak and was renamed Demirhisar. In 1956, she was reported to be involved in gun running from Trieste, Italy, to Cyprus. With the introduction of IMO Numbers in the 1960s, Demirhisar was allocated the IMO Number 5088447. She was sold in 1973 to Ahmet Basak & Ortaklari. She was sold to Rahmi Yagci in 1985 and renamed Rahmi Kaptan. She was removed from the Turkish shipping register in 2006 and deleted from Lloyd's Register in 2010.
