= Battle Against Damnation =

2018 EP by Lovebites

EP by Lovebites
- Released: June 6, 2018
- Studios: Studio Move 705; CPR Studio; DSW Studio; Miyako Studio
- Genre: Power metal
- Length: 21:10
- Label: Victor
- Producer: Steve Jacobs

Lovebites chronology
Awakening from Abyss (2017)	Battle Against Damnation (2018)	Clockwork Immortality (2018)

Battle Against Damnation is the second EP by Japanese power metal band Lovebites. The EP was released in Japan on June 6, 2018 by Victor Entertainment, and in Europe and North America two days later by JPU Records. It reached number 20 on the Oricon chart and number 24 on Billboard Japan.

== Background and release ==
Shocked by the amount of praise they received for their October 2017 first album Awakening from Abyss, Lovebites wanted to quickly put out new music. Battle Against Damnation is their first release since guitarist and keyboardist Miyako changed her stage name from Mi-Ya. While composing for it, Miyako was thinking of Irish guitarist Gary Moore and Russian composer Sergei Rachmaninoff. Several songs that began during the making of this EP were later included on their second album, Clockwork Immortality, released six months later.

Like all of their releases, Battle Against Damnation was mixed by Mikko Karmila and mastered by Mika Jussila at Finnvox Studios in Helsinki, Finland. Also returning, The EasyRabbit CreArtions provided the cover art of a wolf howling at a black sea and red sky, references to two of the EP's song titles; illustrated by Spanish artist David López Gómez and designed by Gómez and Carlos Vincente León. The wolf, which first appeared on the band's previous release, symbolizes that by playing the non-mainstream genre of heavy metal Lovebites are a "lone wolf" in the music scene.

Battle Against Damnation was released in Japan on June 6, 2018 by Victor Entertainment. It was released in the United Kingdom and North America by JPU Records two days later. The EP was supported by a tour with a single concert on June 28 at Tsutaya O-East, which was filmed and released as a concert video later in the year with the limited edition of Clockwork Immortality.

Days after the EP's release, Lovebites won the 2018 Metal Hammer Golden Gods Award for Best New Band. They performed in Germany at Wacken Open Air on August 4, and in England on the main stage at Bloodstock Open Air on August 10. In November, the band held their first European tour that saw them visit the Netherlands, Germany, France and the UK.

Victor released a limited edition vinyl record version of the EP, titled Kamigami e no Chōsen (神々への挑戦, "Challenge to the Gods") in Japanese, on October 2, 2019 with new liner notes by Masanori Ito.

== Themes ==
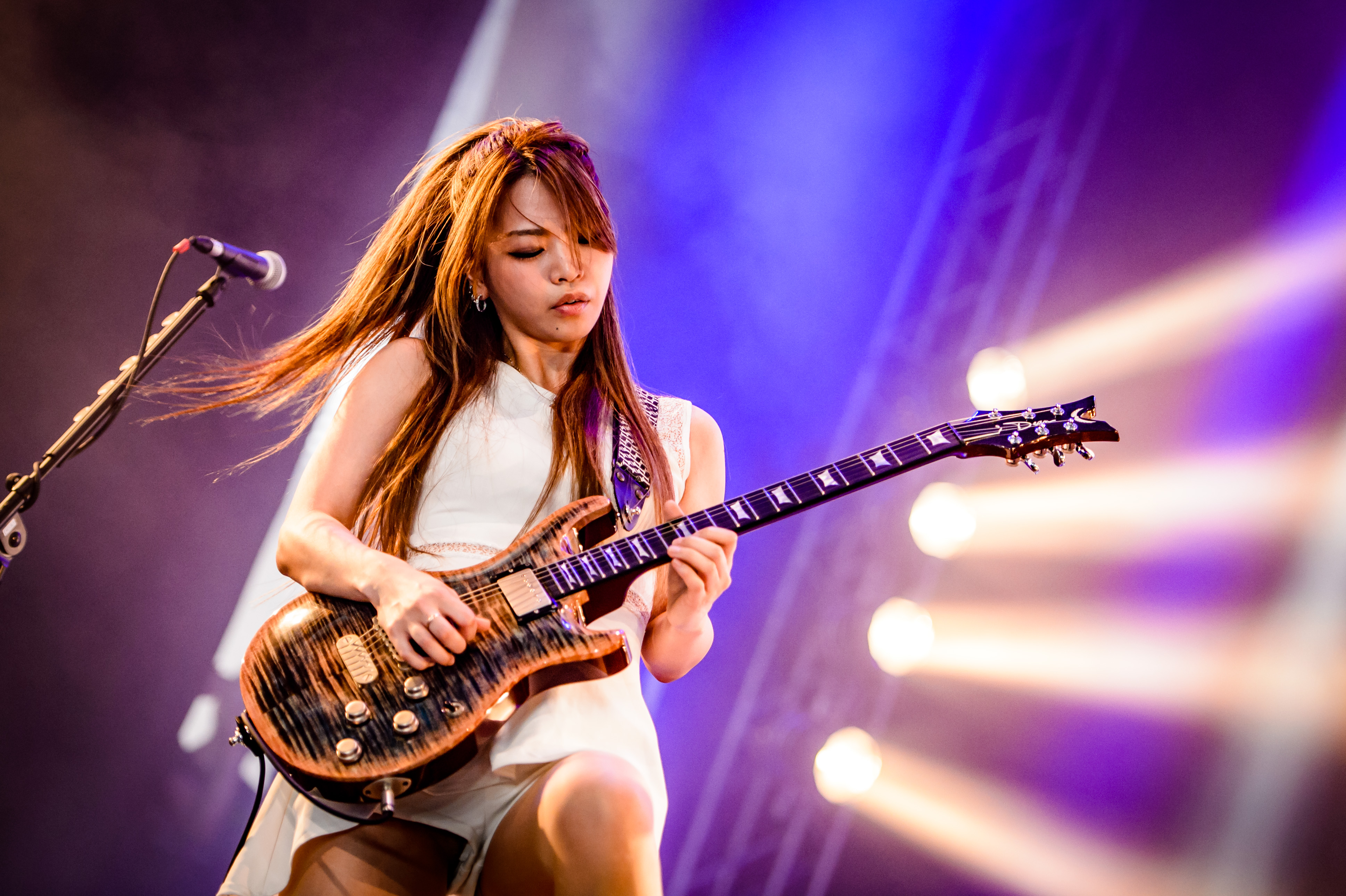
Miyako described the last two songs on the EP as a love letter to Russian composer Sergei Rachmaninoff and very personal for her.

Although they had several songs in contention for opening track of the EP, "The Crusade" was chosen as soon as Miyako composed it and played the band the demo.

Bassist and leader Miho wrote the foundation of "Break the Wall" while Miyako then "added color" to the composition. Miyako wrote the guitar solo in the middle with Gary Moore in mind, whom she identifies with the blues guitar sound. Drummer Haruna called it their most aggressive song to date with a simple lyrical verse that live audiences can sing along to.

The last two tracks, the Miyako-composed "Above the Black Sea" and the Mao-composed "Under the Red Sky", together make up a love letter to Sergei Rachmaninoff. Unable to play his Piano Concerto No. 2 on piano, Miyako created a "guitar concerto" with these songs instead. They are linked by their titles and lyrical themes about war, which also connect to the EP's title.

"Above the Black Sea" has a neoclassical metal feel and Midori played one of her guitar solos in a Yngwie Malmsteen-style at the suggestion of producer Steve Jacobs. Although the lyrics have no clear story, Asami imagined a Japanese Special Attack Unit when writing.

When writing the lyrics to "Under the Red Sky", Asami approached it as a sequel to "The Apocalypse", from both their debut EP and first album, which is about the atomic bombing of Hiroshima.

== Critical reception ==
Professional ratings
Review scores
Source	Rating
Classic Rock	4/5 stars
Distorted Sound	9/10
Leon TK	100%
Metal Forces	8/10
Metal Hammer	4/5 stars
The Soundboard	7/10

Giving the EP a perfect rating and calling it essential listening, music journalist Leon TK claimed "These four tracks are superior to entire swathes of metal albums from the present day and decades past." He wrote that "The Crusade" unleashes nearly every trick in the book and is "far more solid, aggressive, and generally heavy" than Lovebites' previous work, while "Break the Wall" shows Metallica- and Queen-influences, proving they "are no one-trick ponies." Noting "Above the Black Sea" and "Under the Red Sky" as stylistic changes that keep things fresh and engaging, he felt the former draws from Yngwie Malmsteen and symphonic metallers Nightwish, while the latter is "a true progressive voyage" blending everything that came before.

James Weaver of Distorted Sound gave the EP a near-perfect 9/10, stating it "encapsulates everything that LOVEBITES are becoming revered for; a hurricane of riffing and soaring operatic heavy metal." He noted a "brilliantly executed mid-tempo switch" in "Break the Wall" and claimed "Under the Red Sky" features Asami's best vocal deliveries to date. Weaver finished with "Technically brilliant and utterly emphatic, this EP offers a solid insight into The Land of the Rising Sun's hottest new export."

Reviewing the EP for Metal Forces, Neil Arnold gave it an 8/10 and had strong praise for Asami's vocals drifting effortlessly from "full-on soaring power metal volcanic eruptions to an almost clean-cut and poppy design." He wrote that the beauty of the band is that "Lovebites can provide seemingly innocent structures to draw you in, but once inside, you're blasted with a sonic panorama of fully cranked New Wave Of British Heavy Metal-styled velocity."

Giving the EP four out of five stars, Classic Rock's Dannii Leivers called the first two songs "immediate crowd-pleasers, cross-pollinating British heavy metal with power metal, defiantly in thrall to Iron Maiden, Manowar and DragonForce" and the final two songs dense with "theatrical symphonic influence." They finished by saying "This is Lovebites throwing absolutely everything at the wall and watching it all stick."

Sophie Maughan of Metal Hammer also gave it four out of five stars. She compared "The Crusade" to 80s New Wave of British Heavy Metal, "Break the Wall" to early Metallica, and felt that the "grandiose" final two songs show their penchant for a more European sound.

Writing for The Soundboard, Luke Nuttall felt that although it is not a large departure, the EP does see the band growing and branching out from simply playing classic power metal. He cited "Above the Black Sea" as the best example of this, with its "choral and symphonic punctuations breaking through the constant stream of miles-per-hour fretboard dashes." Although seeing a "relative lack of solid songwriting," Nuttall wrote that Lovebites are untouchable at "crafting a sound brimming with pomp and circumstance stemming from their supreme technical wizardry."

At the end of June 2018, readers of Loudersound voted Battle Against Damnation the 10th Best Album of the Year (So Far).

== Commercial performance ==
Battle Against Damnation reached number 20 on the Oricon Albums Chart and stayed on the chart for four weeks. It peaked at number 24 on Billboard Japan's Hot Albums chart. However, it reached number 18 on Billboard Japan's Top Albums Sales chart, which is based only on physical sales.

== Track listing ==
Battle Against Damnation track listing
No.	Title	Lyrics	Music	Arrangement	Length
1.	"The Crusade"	Miho	Miyako	Lovebites, Miyako	4:50
2.	"Break the Wall"	Miho	Miho, Miyako	Lovebites, Miyako	5:25
3.	"Above the Black Sea"	Asami	Miyako	Lovebites, Miyako	5:05
4.	"Under the Red Sky"	Asami	Mao	Lovebites, Mao	5:50
Total length:					21:10

== Personnel ==
Lovebites

- Haruna – drums
- Miho – bass guitar
- Midori – guitars
- Miyako – guitars, keyboards
- Asami – vocals

Other

- Mao – keyboards and programming
- Steve Jacobs – production
- Mikko Karmila – mixing
- Mika Jussila – mastering

== Charts ==
Chart performance of Battle Against Damnation
Chart (2018)	Peak position
Japan Hot Albums (Billboard)	24
Japanese Albums (Oricon)	20
