= Crusader: Adventure Out of Time =

1997 video game

- Developer: Index+
- Publisher: Europress
- Producer: Édouard Lussan
- Composer: Olivier Pryszlak
- Platforms: Windows; Windows 3.x Mac OS
- Release: 1997 (Original); 2000 (Rearranged)
- Genre: Historical adventure
- Mode: Single-player

Crusader: Adventure Out of Time, also known as Crusader: A Conspiracy in the Kingdom of Jerusalem, is a 1997 video game, developed by Index+ and published by Europress. The game was published for Windows, Windows 3.x and Mac OS.

== Gameplay ==
The game features 26 levels and is set in 1183, in the Kingdom of Jerusalem, at which time the relics of the Holy Cross are in danger. Videos of 20 actors are integrated into the computer graphics during gameplay.

== Development ==
A rearranged version of the game was released in 1999, as Crusaders 2000, featuring new puzzles.

The game was not published in Russia.

== Critical reception ==
Crusader: Adventure Out of Time sold 45,000 units in France alone by September 1999.

Just Adventure thought the game was like playing a fun history report, while a different review by the same website found it to be both magnetic and generally enjoyable. Electric Playground thought the game was identical to Vikings sans the historical setting, though noted that Crusader had a more complex story and gameplay. On the contrary, Quandaryland thought that Crusader seemed flatter, and less lifelike than Vikings. While Nquest positively reviewed the title, it argued that it was more of an interactive encyclopedia than a game. Realising Multimedia Potential deemed the game a "new way to approach history".

Jeuxvideo felt that Crusaders 2000 was effectively an unnecessary copy of the original.
