= Jihad! The Musical =

Jihad! The Musical is a musical comedy and jihad satire.

The show was written by Benjamin Scheuer (music/lyrics) and Zoe Samuel (book/lyrics). Jihad! The Musical premiered at the 2007 Edinburgh Festival Fringe and had a London run at the Jermyn Street Theatre in January 2010.

The plot centers on an ambitious Afghan peasant, Sayid al Boom, recruited by a "smooth-talking Islamic fundamentalist in a pinstripe suit" named Hussein Al Mansour.

The show features a number in which a high-kicking chorus line of dancers swathed head to toe in hot-pink burqas back al Mansour up as he sings, "I wanna be like Osama, I wanna bomb a path to fame across the Earth. People may abhor me but by God, they won't ignore me, When the CIA determines what I'm worth."
