= Jihad =

Term for religious struggle in Islam

Jihad (/dʒɪˈhɑːd/; Arabic: جِهَاد, romanized: jihād [d͡ʒɪˈhæːd]) is an Arabic word that means 'exerting', 'striving', or 'struggling', particularly with a praiseworthy aim. Jihad is typically associated with religiously-motivated warfare against external enemies of Islam. In an Islamic context, it encompasses almost any effort to make personal and social life conform with God's guidance, such as an internal struggle against evil in oneself, efforts to build a good Muslim community (ummah), and struggle to defend Islam. For its literal translation 'struggle', the term is frequently associated with warfare.

Jihad is classified into inner ("greater") jihad, which involves a struggle against one's own passions and impulses, and outer ("lesser") jihad, which is further subdivided into jihad of the pen/tongue (debate or persuasion) and jihad of the sword (warfare). Much of Muslim opinion considers inner jihad to have primacy over outer jihad. The analysis of a large survey from 2002 reveals considerable nuance in the conceptions of jihad held by Muslims around the world, ranging from righteous living and promoting peace to fighting against the opponents of Islam.

The word jihad appears frequently in the Qur'an referring to both religious and spiritual struggle and to war and physical struggle, (Note: Seventeen derivatives of jihad occur altogether forty-one times (eleven Meccan texts and thirty Medinan ones), with the following five meanings: striving because of religious belief (21), war (12), non-Muslim parents exerting pressure, that is, jihād, to make their children abandon Islam (2), solemn oaths (5), and physical strength (1).) often in the idiomatic expression "al-jihad fi sabil Allah" ('striving in the path of God'), conveying a sense of self-exertion. In the hadiths, jihad refers predominantly to warfare. Greater jihad refers to spiritual and moral struggle, and has traditionally been emphasized in Sufi and Ahmadiyya circles. The sense of jihad as armed resistance was first used in the context of persecution faced by Muslims when Muhammad was at Mecca, when the community had two choices: further emigration (hijrah) or war. The Qur'an justifies war in self-defense or in response to aggression towards other Muslims, however the sword verses have historically been interpreted to abrogate other verses and justify offensive war against unbelievers, forcibly converting polytheistic pagans during the early Muslim conquests. A set of rules pertaining to jihad were developed, including prohibitions on harming those who are not engaged in combat, on killing animals such as horses, and on unnecessary destruction of enemy property.

In the twentieth century, the notion of jihad lost its jurisprudential relevance and instead gave rise to ideological and political discourse. While modernist Islamic scholars have emphasized the defensive and non-military aspects of jihad, some Islamists have advanced aggressive interpretations that go beyond the classical texts. The term has gained additional attention in recent decades through its use by various insurgent Islamic extremist, militant Islamist, and terrorist individuals and organizations. Today, the word jihad is often used without religious connotations, like the English crusade.

== Etymology and literary origins ==
The term jihad is derived from the Arabic root jahada, meaning "to exert strength and effort, to use all means in order to accomplish a task". In its expanded sense, it can be fighting the enemies of Islam, as well as adhering to religious teachings, enjoining good and forbidding evil. The peaceful sense of "efforts towards the moral uplift of society or towards the spread of Islam" can be known as "jihad of the tongue" or "jihad of the pen", as opposed to "jihad of the sword". It is used as a term in fiqh (Islamic jurisprudence) mostly in the latter sense, while in Sufism mostly in the sense of fighting the nafs al-ammara, which is the psychological state of succumbing to one's own desires. Spiritual and moral jihad is generally emphasized in pious and mystical circles.

The Hans Wehr Dictionary of Modern Written Arabic defines the term as "fight, battle; jihad, holy war (against the infidels, as a religious duty)". However, given the range of meanings, it is incorrect to equate it simply with "holy war". The notion of jihad has its origins in the Islamic idea that the whole humankind will embrace Islam. In the Qur'an and in later Muslim usage, jihad is commonly followed by the expression fi sabil illah, "in the path of God." Muhammad Abdel-Haleem stated that it indicates "the way of truth and justice, including all the teachings it gives on the justifications and the conditions for the conduct of war and peace."

In Modern Standard Arabic, the term jihad is used for a struggle for causes, both religious and secular. It is sometimes used without religious connotation, with a meaning similar to the English word "crusade" (as in "a crusade against drugs"). Jihad is used commonly in Arabic countries, in the neutral sense of "a struggle for a noble cause", as a unisex name given to children. Nonetheless, jihad is usually used in the religious sense and its beginnings trace to the Qur'an and the words and actions of Muhammad.

=== Quran ===
Jihad is mentioned in four places in the Qur'an as a noun, while its derived verb is used in twenty-four places. Mujahid, the active participle meaning "jihadist", is mentioned in two verses. In some of these mentions (see At-Tawbah 9/41, 44, 81, 86), it is understood that the word jihad directly refers to war, and in others, jihad is used in the sense of "the effort to live in accordance with Allah's will". Qur'anic exhortations to jihad have been interpreted by Islamic scholars both in the combative and non-combative sense. Ahmed al-Dawoody wrote that there are seventeen references to or derivatives of jihad occur altogether forty-one times in eleven Meccan texts and thirty Medinan ones, with 28 mentions related to religious belief or spiritual struggle and 13 mentions related to warfare or physical struggle.

=== Hadith ===
There are also many hadiths (records of the teachings, deeds and sayings of the Islamic prophet Muhammad) about jihad, typically under the headings of kitab al-jihad (book of jihad) or faza'il al-jihad (virtues of jihad) in hadith collections or as the subject of independent works. Of the 199 hadith references to jihad in the Bukhari collection of hadith, all assume that jihad means warfare.

Among reported sayings of Muhammad involving jihad are:

The best Jihad is the word of Justice in front of the oppressive sultan.

— cited by Ibn Nuhaas and narrated by Ibn Habbaan

and

The Messenger of Allah was asked about the best jihad. He said: "The best jihad is the one in which your horse is slain and your blood is spilled."

— cited by Ibn Nuhaas and narrated by Ibn Habbaan

Ibn Nuhaas cited a hadith from Musnad Ahmad ibn Hanbal, where Muhammad stated that the highest kind jihad is "The person who is killed whilst spilling the last of his blood" (Ahmed 4/144). Muhammad also said, "I cannot find anything" as meritorious as jihad; he further likened jihad to "praying ceaselessly and fasting continuously". Muhammad said that "if it were not a hardship for the Muslims, I would never idle behind from a raiding party going out to fight in the path of Allah.... I [would] love to raid in the path of Allah and be killed, to raid again and be killed, and to raid again and be killed". Muhammad also said that "Lining up for battle in the path of Allah [jihad] is worthier than 60 years of worship". Muhammad claimed that any Muslim who refused to fight in jihad "will be tortured like no other sinful human" in hell with confirmation from Qur'an 8:15-16. In another hadith Muhammad said, "the sword wipes away all sins" and "being killed in the path of Allah washes away impurity".

According to another hadith, supporting one's parents is an example of jihad. It has been reported that Muhammad considered performing hajj well to be the best jihad for Muslim women.

The hadith emphasize jihad as one of the means to Paradise. All sins (except debt) would be forgiven for the one who dies in it. Participation in jihad had to be voluntary and intention must be pure, for jihad is only waged for the sake of God not for material wealth. On the contrary, jihad required man to put both his life and wealth at risk. Jihad is ranked as one of the highest good deeds; according to one hadith it is the third-best deed after prayer and being good to one's parents. One hadith exempts military jihad on men whose parents are alive, as serving one's parents is considered a superior jihad.

== Greater and lesser jihad ==
Tradition distinguishes the "greater jihad" (inner struggle against sinful behavior) from the "lesser jihad" (military sense). Early Islamic thought considered non-violent interpretations of jihad, especially for those Muslims who could not partake in warfare in distant lands. Most classical writings use the term "jihad" in the military sense. The tradition differentiating between the "greater and lesser jihad" is not included in any of the authoritative compilations of Hadith. In consequence, some Islamists dismiss it as not authentic.

The most commonly cited hadith for "greater jihad" is:

A number of fighters came to Muhammad and he said "You have come from the 'lesser jihad' to the 'greater jihad'." The fighters asked "what is the greater jihad?" Muhammad replied, "It is the struggle against one's passions."

This passage was cited in The History of Baghdad by al-Khatib al-Baghdadi, an 11th-century Islamic scholar. This reference gave rise to the practice of distinguishing "greater" and "lesser" jihad. Islamic scholars such as Ibn Hajar al-Asqalani consider the hadith to have a weak chain of transmission.

The concept has had "enormous influence" in Islamic mysticism (Sufism).

Ibn Hazm lists four kinds of jihad fi sabilillah (struggle in the cause of God):

- Jihad of the heart (jihad bil qalb/nafs) is concerned with combatting the devil and in the attempt to escape his persuasion to evil. This type of jihad was regarded as the greater jihad (al-jihad al-akbar).
- Jihad by the tongue (jihad bil lisan) (also jihad by the word, jihad al-qalam) is concerned with speaking the truth and spreading the word of Islam with one's tongue.
- Jihad by the hand (jihad bil yad) refers to choosing to do what is right and to combat injustice and what is wrong with action.
- Jihad by the sword (jihad bis saif) refers to qital fi sabilillah (armed fighting in the way of God, or holy war), the most common usage by Salafi Muslims and offshoots of the Muslim Brotherhood.

A related hadith tradition that has "found its way into popular Muslim literature", and which has been said to "embody the Muslim mindset" of the Islamic Golden Age (the period from the mid-8th century to mid-13th century following the relocation of the Abbasid capital from Damascus to Baghdad), is:

"The ink of the scholar is more holy than the blood of the martyr."

The belief in the veracity of this hadith was a contributing factor in the efforts by successive caliphs to subsidize translations of "Greek, Hebrew and Syriac science and philosophy texts", and the saying continues to be heavily emphasised in certain Islamic traditions advocating intellectualism over violence, for example in Timbuktu, where it is central to one of two key lessons in the work Tuhfat al-Fudala by 16th-century Berber scholar Ahmed Baba. In general, however, fewer people today are aware of the hadith, which suffers from "a general lack of knowledge", according to Akbar Ahmed.

According to classical Islamic scholars like Ibn Qayyim al-Jawziyya, jihad is against four types of enemies: the lower self (nafs), Satan, the unbelievers, and the hypocrites. The first two types of jihad are purely peaceful spiritual struggles. According to Ibn Qayyim, "Jihad against the lower self precedes jihad against external enemies." Confirming the central importance of the spiritual aspect of jihad, Ibn Taymiyyah wrote:

"Jihad against the lower self and whims is the foundation of jihad against the unbelievers and hypocrites, for a Muslim cannot wage jihad against them unless he has waged jihad against himself and his desires first, before he goes out against them."

Engaging in the greater jihad does not preclude engaging in the lesser jihad. Abd al-Qadir al-Jilani recommended his followers to pursue both the greater and the lesser jihads.

At least one important contemporary Twelver Shia figure, Ayatollah Ruhollah Khomeini, the leader of the Iranian Revolution and the founder of the Islamic Republic of Iran, wrote a treatise on the "Greater Jihad" (i.e., internal/personal struggle against sin).

Robert W. Schaefer discussed jihad and gazavat in the context of the Caucasus: "Gazavat was the jihad of its day. Gazavat meant putting yourself on the right path (what Muslims refer to as the lesser jihad) as well as expelling the invader (what is referred to as greater jihad)."

== Defensive and offensive lesser jihad ==
Classical scholars considered various justifications for jihad, including waging it defensively vs offensively. Scholarly opinions carried significant weight with Muslim leaders. Scholars paid more attention to conduct of war (jus in bello) than justification of war (jus ad bellum). The decision of when to wage war was often viewed as a political decision best left to political authorities.

Two justifications for jihad were given: defensive war against external aggression, or an offensive or preemptive attack against an enemy state. According to the majority of jurists, the casus belli (justifications for war) are restricted to aggression against Muslims, and fitna—persecution of Muslims because of their religious belief. They hold that unbelief in itself is not a justification for war. These jurists therefore maintain that only combatants are to be fought; noncombatants such as women, children, clergy, the aged, the insane, farmers, serfs, the blind, and so on are not to be killed in war. Thus, the Hanafī Ibn Najīm stated: "the reason for jihād in our [the Hanafīs] view is kawnuhum harbā ‛alaynā [literally, their being at war against us]." The Hanafī jurists al-Shaybānī state that "although unbelief in God is one of the greatest sins, it is between the individual and his God the Almighty and the punishment for this sin is to be postponed to the dār al-jazā', (the abode of reckoning, the Hereafter)." Al-Sarakhsī says something similar. Offensive jihad involved forays into enemy territory either for conquest, thus enlarging the Muslim political order, or to dissuade the enemy from attacking Muslim lands.

Shia and Sunni theories of jihad are similar, except that Shias consider offensive jihad to be valid only under the leadership of the Mahdi, who is currently believed to be in occultation but will return. However, defensive jihad is permissible in Shia Islam before the Mahdi's return. In fact, Shia scholars emphasized it was a religious duty for Shia to defend all Muslims (including Sunni Muslims) from outside invaders.

=== Rules of warfare ===
They might be our enemies but they are human beings. They consist of civil population comprising of women and children; how can one kill, loot and plunder them?

— Ali ibn Abi Talib, Najh al-Balagha

Rules prohibit attacking or molesting non-combatants, including women, children under the age of puberty, elderly men, people with disabilities and those who are sick. Diplomats, merchants and peasants are similarly immune from being attacked. Monks are presumed to be non-combatants and thus have immunity; places of worship should not be attacked. Even if the enemy disregarded the immunity of noncombatants, Muslims could not respond in kind. However, these categories lose their immunity should they participate in fighting, planning, or supplying the enemy. Some jurists argued that immunity was more related to noncombatant status than being in a certain demographic class. For example, Muhaqqiq al-Hilli opined that only old men are only immune from being killed if they neither fight, nor take a role in military decision making.

Up until the Crusades, Muslim jurists disallowed the use of mangonels because the weapon killed indiscriminately with the potential of harming noncombatants. During the Crusades this ruling was reversed out of military need. Jurists grappled with the question of attacking an enemy that used women, children or Muslims as human shields. Most jurists held that it was permissible to attack the enemy in cases of military necessity, but steps should be taken to direct the attack towards combatants to avoid the human shield. Abu Hanifa argued that if Muslims stopped combat for fear of killing noncombatants, then such a rule would make fighting impossible, as every city had civilians. Mutilating the enemy dead is prohibited.

Two rulings on destruction of enemy property conflict. In one military battle, Prophet Muhammad ordered the destruction of an enemy's palm trees as a means of ending a siege without bloodshed. By contrast, Abu Bakr prohibited destruction of trees, buildings and livestock. Most jurists did not allow unnecessary destruction of enemy property, but allowed it in cases of military necessity, such as destroying buildings in which the enemy is taking shelter. Some jurists allowed destruction if it would weaken the enemy or win the war. Many jurists cautioned against "unnecessary devastation", not just out of humanitarian concerns, but practical ones: it is more useful to capture an enemy's property than to destroy it. Islamic scholars prohibited killing animals, unless due to military necessity (such as killing horses in battle). This is because, unlike property, animals feel pain.

== History ==
In pre-Islamic Arabia, Bedouins raided enemy tribes and settlements to collect spoils. According to some scholars (such as James Turner Johnson), while Islamic leaders "instilled into the hearts of the warriors the belief" in jihad "holy war" and ghaza (raids), the "fundamental structure" of this Bedouin warfare "remained, ... raiding to collect booty". According to Jonathan Berkey, the Qur'an's statements in support of jihad may have originally been directed against Muhammad's local enemies, the pagans of Mecca or the Jews of Medina, but these same statements could be redirected once new enemies appeared. According to scholar Majid Khadduri, it was the shift in focus to the conquest and spoils collecting of non-Bedouin unbelievers and away from traditional inter-Bedouin tribal raids, that may have made it possible for Islam to expand and to avoid self-destruction.

=== Classical ===
According to Al-Baqara 256 "there is no compulsion in religion". The primary aim of jihad as warfare is not the conversion of non-Muslims to Islam by force, but rather the expansion and defense of the Islamic state. There could be truces before this was achieved, but no permanent peace. One who died "on the path of God" was a martyr (shahid), whose sins were remitted and who secured "immediate entry to paradise".

According with Bernard Lewis, "from an early date Muslim law laid down" jihad in the military sense as "one of the principal obligations" of both "the head of the Muslim state", who declared jihad, and the Muslim community. According to legal historian Sadakat Kadri, Islamic jurists first developed classical doctrine of jihad "towards the end of the eighth century", using the doctrine of naskh (that God gradually improved His revelations over the course of Muhammed's mission). They subordinated Qur'anic verses emphasizing harmony to the more "confrontational" verses of Muhammad's later years and linked verses on exertion (jihad) to those of fighting (qital). Muslims jurists of the eighth century divided the world into three divisions, dar al-Islam/dar al-‛adl/dar al-salam (house of Islam/house of justice/house of peace), dar al-harb/dar al-jawr (house of war/house of injustice, oppression), and dar al-sulh/dar al-‛ahd/dār al-muwada‛ah (house of peace/house of covenant/house of reconciliation). The eighth century jurist Sufyan al-Thawri (d. 778) headed what Khadduri called a pacifist school, which maintained that jihad was only a defensive war. He stated that the jurists who held this position, among whom he refers to Hanafi jurists al-Awza‛i (d. 774) and Malik ibn Anas (d. 795), and other early jurists, "stressed that tolerance should be shown unbelievers, especially scripturaries and advised the Imam to prosecute war only when the inhabitants of the dar al-harb came into conflict with Islam." The duty of Jihad was a collective one (fard al-kifaya). It was to be directed only by the caliph who might delay it when convenient, negotiating truces for up to ten years at a time. Within classical Islamic jurisprudence, during the first few centuries after the prophet's death, jihad consisted of wars against unbelievers, apostated, and was the only form of permissible warfare. Bernard Lewis stated that fighting rebels and bandits was legitimate, though not a form of jihad, and that while the classical perception and presentation of jihad was warfare in the field against a foreign enemy, internal jihad "against an infidel renegade, or otherwise illegitimate regime was not unknown.")

However, some argue martyrdom is never automatic, because it is God's province to judge who is worthy of that designation.

Classical manuals of Islamic jurisprudence often contained a section called Book of Jihad, with rules governing the conduct of war covered at great length. Such rules include treatment of nonbelligerents, women, children (also cultivated or residential areas), and division of spoils. Such rules offered protection for civilians. Spoils include Ghanimah (spoils obtained by actual fighting), and fai (obtained without fighting i.e. when the enemy surrenders or flees).

The first documentation of the law of jihad was written by 'Abd al-Rahman al-Awza'i and Muhammad ibn al-Hasan al-Shaybani. (It grew out of debates that surfaced following Muhammad's death.) Although some Islamic scholars have differed on the implementation of Jihad, the consensus amongst them is that jihad always includes armed struggle against persecution and oppression.

Both Ibn Taymiyya and Ibn Qayyim asserted that Muhammad never initiated hostilities and that all the wars he engaged in were primarily defensive. He never forced non-Muslims to Islam and upheld the truces with non-Muslims so long as they did not violate them. Ibn Taymiyya's views on Jihad are explained in his treatise titled Qāʿidah mukhtaṣarah fī qitāl al-kuffār wa muhādanatuhum wa taḥrīm qatlahum li mujarrad kufrihim. (An abridged rule on fighting the unbelievers and making truces with them, and the prohibition of killing them merely because of their unbelief). According to Ibn Taymiyya, human blood is inviolable by default, except "by right of justice". Although Ibn Taymiyya authorised offensive Jihad (Jihad al-Talab) against enemies who threaten Muslims or obstruct their citizens from freely accepting Islam, unbelief (Kufr) by itself is not a justification for violence, whether against individuals or stated. According to Ibn Taymīyah, jihad is a legitimate reaction to military aggression by unbelievers and not merely due to religious differences. Ibn Taymiyya wrote:

"As for the transgressor who does not fight, there are no texts in which Allah commands him to be fought. Rather, the unbelievers are only fought on the condition that they wage war, as is practiced by the majority of scholars and is evident in the Book and Sunnah."

However, there is a dispute amongst scholars regarding whether Ibn Taymiyya actually wrote the 'Qāʿidah mukhtaṣarah fī qitāl al-kuffār wa muhādanatuhum wa taḥrīm qatlahum li mujarrad kufrihim' treatise.

As important as jihad was, it is not considered one of the "pillars of Islam". According to one scholar (Majid Khadduri, this is because the five pillars are individual obligations, but jihad is a "collective obligation" of the Muslim community meant to be carried out by the Islamic state. This was the belief of "all jurists, with almost no exception", but did not apply to defense of the Muslim community from a sudden attack, in which case jihad was an "individual obligation" of all believers, including women and children.

Scholars had previously claimed it was the responsibility of a centralized government to organize jihad. But this changed as the authority of the Abbasid caliph weakened. Al-Mawardi allowed local governors to wage jihad on the caliph's behalf. This decentralization of jihad became especially pressing after the Crusades. Ali ibn Tahir al-Sulami argued that all Muslims were responsible for waging wars of self-defense. Al-Sulami encouraged Muslim rulers from distant lands to assist Muslims who were under attack.

Classical Shia doctrine maintained defensive jihad was always permissible, but offensive jihad required the presence of the Imam. An exception to this, during medieval times, was when the first Fatimid caliph Abdallah al-Mahdi Billah claimed to be the representative of the Imam and claimed the right to launch offensive jihad.

After the Mongol invasions, Shia scholar Muhaqqiq al-Hilli claimed that defensive war was not just permissible but praiseworthy, even obligatory. If a Muslim could not take part in the defense then he should, at least, send material support. This remained the case even if the Muslims were ruled by an unjust ruler.

==== Early Muslim conquests ====
Age of the Caliphs Expansion under Muhammad, 622–632/A.H. 1–11 Expansion during the Rashidun Caliphate, 632–661/A.H. 11–40 Expansion during the Umayyad Caliphate, 661–750/A.H. 40–129

In the early era that inspired classical Islam (Rashidun Caliphate) and lasted less than a century, jihad spread the realm of Islam to include millions of subjects, and an area extending "from the borders of India and China to the Pyrenees and the Atlantic". The role of religion in these early conquests is debated. Medieval Arabic authors claimed the conquests were commanded by God, and presented them as orderly and disciplined, under the command of the caliph. Many modern historians question whether hunger and desertification, rather than jihad, was a motivating force in the conquests. Historian William Montgomery Watt argued, "Most of the participants in the [early Islamic] expeditions probably thought of nothing more than booty ... There was no thought of spreading the religion of Islam." Similarly, Edward J. Jurji argues that the motivations of the Arab conquests were certainly not "the propagation of Islam....Military advantage, economic desires, [and] the attempt to strengthen the hand of the state and enhance its sovereignty...are some of the determining factors." Some recent explanations cite both material and religious causes in the conquests.

=== Post-classical usage ===
According to some authors, the more spiritual definitions of jihad developed sometime after the 150 years of jihad wars and Muslim territorial expansion, and particularly after the Mongol invaders sacked Baghdad and overthrew the Abbasid Caliphate. Historian Hamilton Gibb stated, "in the historic [Muslim] Community the concept of jihad had gradually weakened and at length it had been largely reinterpreted in terms of Sufi ethics." notes that "despite the theoretical importance of the idea of jihad in classical Islamic juristic thought", by the time of the Abbasids, the concept was no longer central to statecraft.

Rudolph Peters wrote that with the stagnation of Islamic expansionism, the concept of jihad became internalized as a moral or spiritual struggle. Earlier classical works on fiqh emphasized jihad as war for God's religion, Peters claimed. Later Islamic scholars like Ibn al-Amir al-San'ani, Muhammad Abduh, Rashid Rida, Ubaidullah Sindhi, Yusuf al-Qaradawi, Shibli Nomani, etc. emphasized the defensive aspect of jihad, distinguishing between defensive jihad (jihad al-daf) and offensive jihad (jihad al-talab or jihad of choice). They refuted the notion of consensus that jihad al-talab was a communal obligation (fard kifaya). In support of this view, these scholars referred to the works of classical scholars such as Al-Jassas and Ibn Taymiyyah. According to Ibn Taymiyya, the reason for jihad against non-Muslims is not their disbelief, but the threat they pose to Muslims. Citing Ibn Taymiyya, scholars including Rashid Rida, Al San'ani, and Qaradawi argued that unbelievers need not be fought unless they pose a threat to Muslims. Thus, jihad is obligatory only as defensive warfare to respond to aggression or "perfidy" against the Muslim community, and that the "normal and desired state" between Islamic and non-Islamic territories was one of "peaceful coexistence". This was similar to the Western "Just war" concept. Similarly 18th-century scholar Muhammad ibn Abd al-Wahhab defined jihad as a defensive military action to protect the Muslim community, and emphasized its defensive aspect in synchrony with later 20th century Islamic writers. Today, some Muslim authors only recognize as legitimate wars fought for the purpose of territorial defense as well as wars fought for the defense of religious freedom.

Ibn Taymiyyah's hallmark themes included the permissibility of overthrowing a ruler who is classified as an unbeliever due to a failure to adhere to Islamic law, the absolute division of the world into dar al-kufr and dar al-Islam, labeling anyone not adhering to one's particular interpretation of Islam as an unbeliever, and the call for warfare against Non-Muslims, particularly Jews and Christians.

Ibn Taymiyyah recognized "the possibility of a jihad against `heretical` and `deviant` Muslims within dar al-Islam. He identified as heretical and deviant Muslims anyone who propagated innovations (bida') contrary to the Qur'an and Sunna ... legitimated jihad against anyone who refused to abide by Islamic law or revolted against the true Muslim authorities." He used a broad definition of what constituted aggression or rebellion against Muslims, which would make jihad "not only permissible but necessary." Ibn Taymiyyah paid careful attention to the questions of martyrdom and the benefits of jihad: "It is in jihad that one can live and die in ultimate happiness, both in this world and in the Hereafter. Abandoning it means losing entirely or partially both kinds of happiness."

Bernard Lewis stated that while most Islamic theologians in the classical period (750–1258 CE) understood jihad to be a military endeavor, after Islamic conquest stagnated and the caliphate divided into smaller stated, "irresistible and permanent jihad came to an end". As jihad became unfeasible it was "postponed from historic to messianic time." Even when the Ottoman Empire carried on a new holy war of expansion in the seventeenth century, "the war was not universally pursued". They made no attempt to recover Spain or Sicily.

By the 1500s, it had become accepted that the permanent state of relations between dar al-Islam and dar al-harb was that of peace.

Shah Ismail of the Safavid dynasty tried to claim the right to wage offensive jihad, particularly against the Ottomans. However, Shia ulama did not permit that, maintaining the classical position that the true Imam could wage such a war. During the Qajar period, Shia ulama adopted the position that the Shah was responsible for national security. They authorized the Perso-Russian wars in the 19th century as jihad.

In the 18th century, the Durrani Empire under the reigns of Ahmad Shah Durrani and his son and successor, Timur Shah Durrani, had declared jihads against Sikh Misls in the Punjab region, often to consolidate territory and continue Afghan their region, efforts under Ahmad Shah failed, while Timur Shah had succeeded.

=== Colonialism and modernism ===
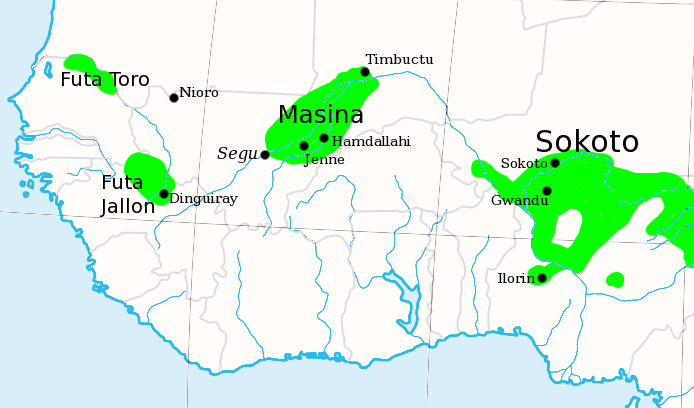
The Fulani jihad states of West Africa, c. 1830

When Europeans began to colonize the Muslim world, jihad was one of the first responses. Emir Abdelkader organized a jihad in Algeria against French domination, tapping into existing Sufi networks. Other wars were often declared to be jihad: the Senussi religious order declared jihad against Italian control of Libya in 1912, and the "Mahdi" in Sudan declared jihad against the United Kingdom and Egypt in 1881. Rashid Rida and Muhammad Abduh argued that peaceful coexistence should be the normal state between Muslim and non-Muslim stated, citing verses in the Qur'an that allowed war only in self-defense. However, this view left open jihad against colonialism, which was seen as an attack on Muslims.

Syed Ahmad Khan argued that jihad was limited to cases of oppression, and since the British Raj allowed freedom of religion, jihad against the British was unnecessary. Instead, Khan formulated jihad as recovering past Muslim scientific progress to modernize the Muslim world. A concept that played a role in anti-colonial jihad (or lack thereof) was the belief in Mahdi. According to Islamic eschatology, a messianic figure named Mahdi will one day appear and restore justice on earth. This belief sometimes discouraged Muslims from conducting jihad, instead inducing them to wait. Such messages were circulated in Algeria to undermine Emir Abdelkader's jihad against the French. Alternatively, this belief could be a powerful mobilizing force when someone proclaimed to be the Mahdi. Mahdist rebellions happened in India (1810), Egypt (1865) and Sudan (1881).

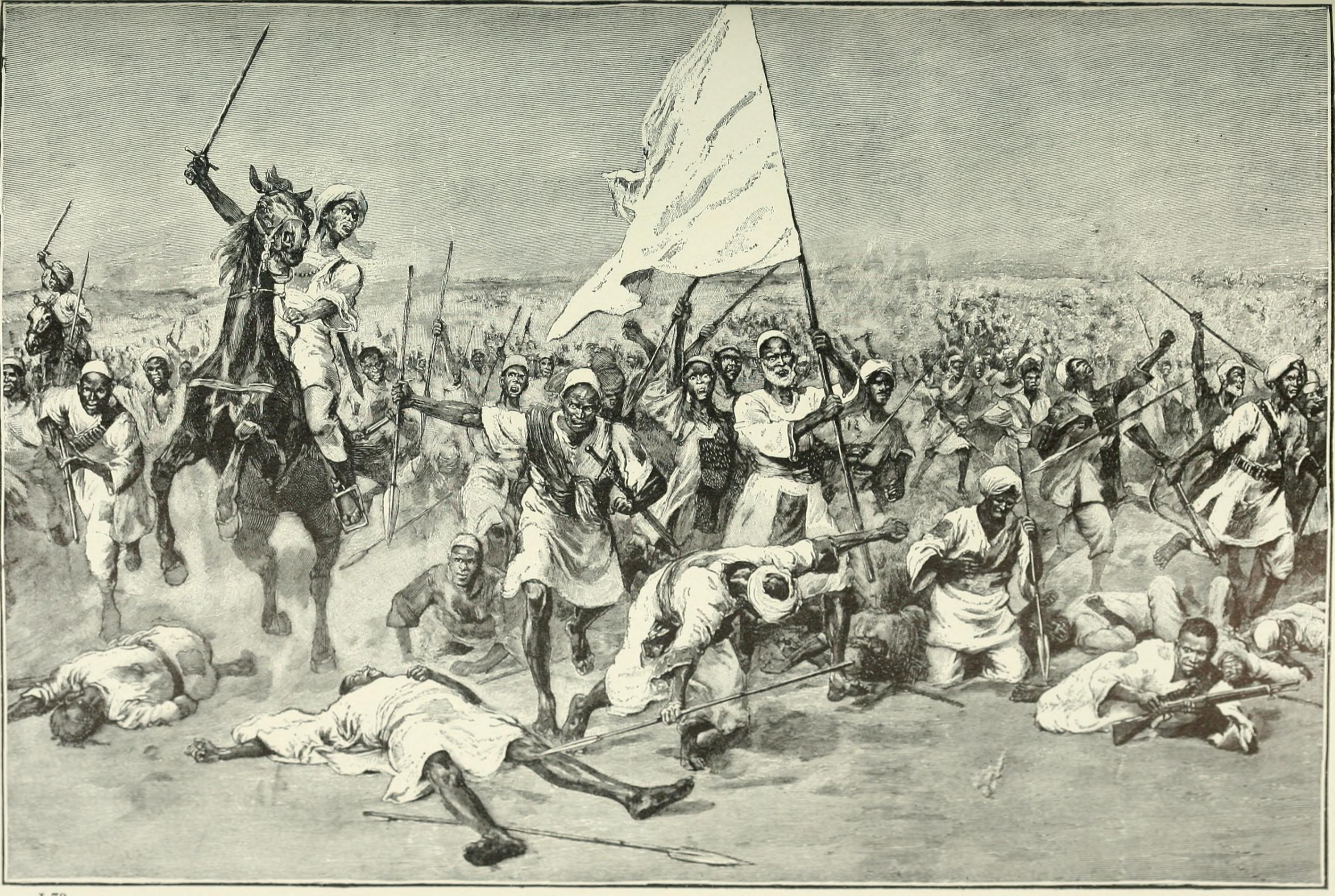
Charging Mahdist army during the Battle of Omdurman in 1898

With the Islamic revival, a new "fundamentalist" movement arose, with different interpretations of Islam that increased emphasis on jihad. The Wahhabi movement that spread across the Arabian peninsula starting in the 18th century emphasized jihad as armed struggle. The Fula jihads in West Africa during the 18th and 19th centuries led to the establishment of various states, most notably the Sokoto Caliphate. None of these movements were victorious. The Sokoto Caliphate lasted for a century until it was conquered by the British and incorporated into Colonial Nigeria in 1903.

=== Ottoman Jihad in World War One ===
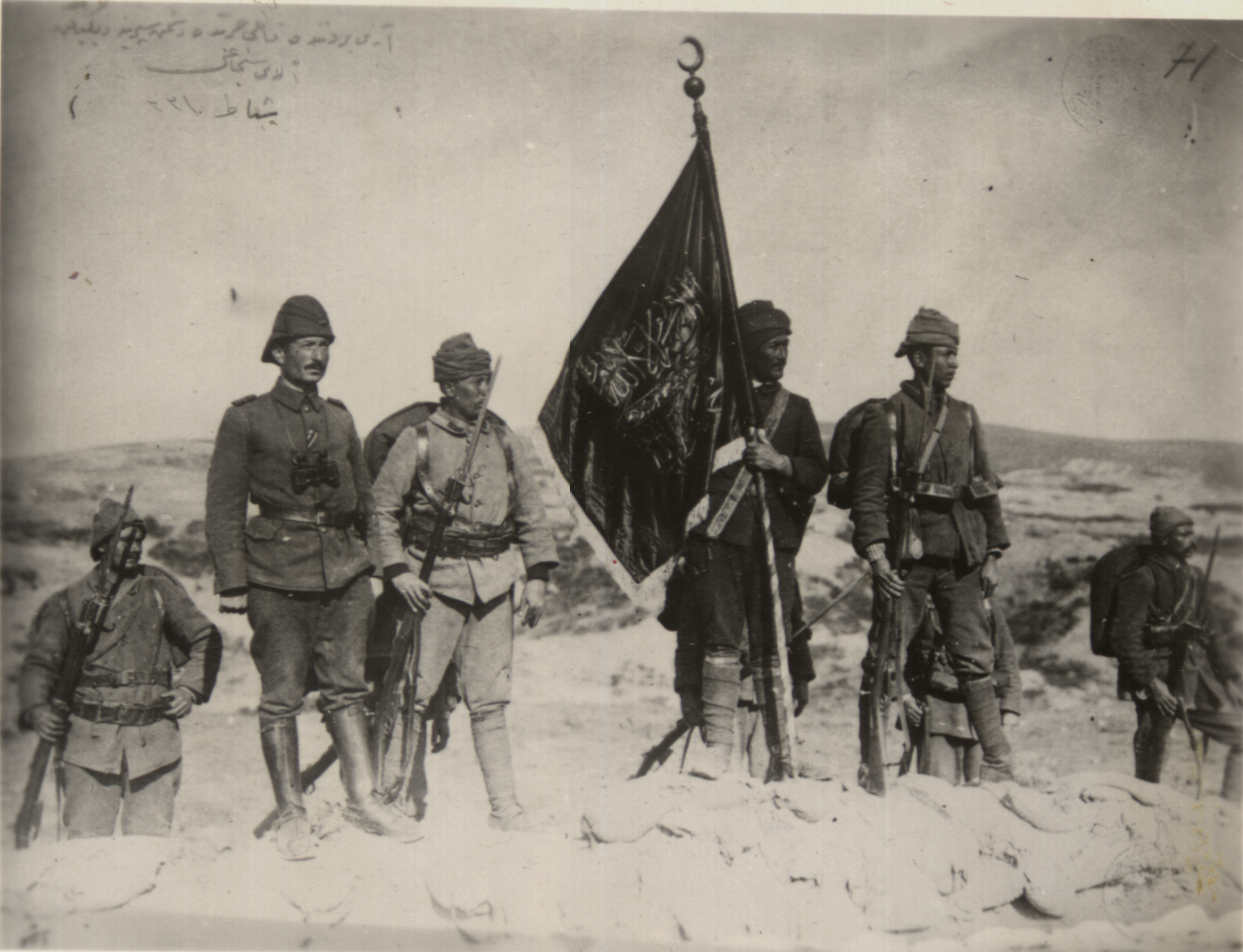
Ottoman soldiers with Ottoman Shahada Regimental Standard at Kanlisirt, Gallipoli campaign in 1915

When the Ottoman caliph called for a "Great Jihad" Muslims against Allied powers during World War I, hopes and fears emerged that non-Turkish Muslims would side with Ottoman Turkey, but the appeal did not unite the Muslim world, and Muslims did not turn on their non-Muslim commanders in the Allied forces. (The war led to the end of the caliphate as the Ottoman Empire allied with the war's losers and surrendered. Post-war capitulations were overturned by secularist Mustafa Kemal, who later abolished the caliphate.)

Prior to the Iranian revolution in 1922, Shiite cleric Mehdi Al-Khalissi issued a fatwa prohibiting Iraqis from participating in the Iraqi elections, as the Iraqi government had been established by foreign powers. He later played a role in the Iraqi revolt of 1920. Between 1918 and 1919 in the Shia holy city of Najaf the League of the Islamic Awakening (Jimyat al Nahda al Islamiya) was established by religious scholars, tribal chiefs, and landlords who assassinated a British political officer, Captain Marshall, in the hopes of sparking a similar rebellion in Karbala.

During the revolt, Ayatollah Muhammad Taqi Shirazi, father of Mohammad al-Husayni al-Shirazi and grandfather of Sadiq Hussaini Shirazi, declared British rule impermissible and called for jihad against European occupations in the Middle East.

=== Post-colonialism ===
Islamism played an increasing role in the Muslim world in the 20th century, especially following the economic crises of the 1970s and 1980s. One of the first Islamist groups, the Muslim Brotherhood, emphasized physical struggle and martyrdom in its creed: "God is our objective; the Qur'an is our constitution; the Prophet is our leader; struggle (jihad) is our way; and death for the sake of God is the highest of our aspirations." Hassan al-Banna emphasized jihad of the sword, and called on Egyptians to jihad against the British Empire, (the first influential scholar since the 1857 India uprising to do so). The group called for jihad against Israel in the 1940s, and its Palestinian branch, Hamas, called for jihad against Israel during the First Intifada.

Modern Muslim thought had been focused on when to go to war (jus ad bellum), not paying much attention on conduct during war (jus in bello). This was because most Muslim theorists viewed international humanitarian law as consistent with Islamic requirements. However, Muslims later discussed conduct during war in response to terrorist groups who targeted civilians.

According to Rudolph F. Peters and Natana J. DeLong-Bas, the new "fundamentalist" movement brought a reinterpretation of Islam and their own writings on jihad. These writings tended to be less involved with the different of schools of Islamic law, or in solutions for all potential situations. "They emphasize more the moral justifications and the underlying ethical values of the rules, than the detailed elaboration of those rules." They also tended to ignore the distinction between Greater and Lesser jihad because it distracted Muslims "from the development of the combative spirit they believe is required to rid the Islamic world of Western influences".

Contemporary Islamic fundamentalists were often influenced by the ideas of Ibn Taymiyyah, and Egyptian journalist Sayyid Qutb.

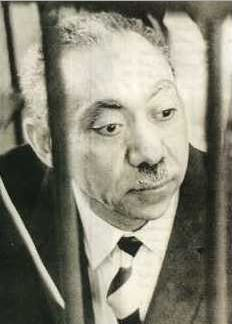
Sayyid Qutb, Islamist author and influential leader of the Muslim Brotherhood

Qutb preached in his book Milestones that jihad, "is not a temporary phase but a permanent war ... Jihad for freedom cannot cease until the Satanic forces are put to an end and the religion is purified for God in toto." Qutb focused on martyrdom and jihad, adding the theme of treachery and enmity towards Islam of Christians and especially Jews. If non-Muslims were waging a "war against Islam", jihad against them was defensive, not offensive. He insisted that Christians and Jews were mushrikeen (not monotheists) because (he alleged) they gave their priests or rabbis "authority to make laws, obeying laws which were made by them [and] not permitted by God" and "obedience to laws and judgments is a sort of worship".

Later ideologue, Muhammad abd-al-Salam Faraj, departed from some of Qutb's teachings. While Qutb felt that jihad was a proclamation of "liberation for humanity" (in which humanity has the free choice between Islam and unbelief), Faraj saw jihad as a mean of conquering the world and reestablishing the caliphate. Faraj legitimized lying, attacking by night (even accidentally killing innocents), and destroying trees of the infidel. His ideas influenced Egyptian Islamist extremist groups, and Ayman al-Zawahiri, later the leader of al-Qaeda.

During the Soviet invasion of Afghanistan, and although it was predominantly Sunni, Afghanistan's Shiite population took arms against the Communist government and allied Soviet forces and the nation's Sunnis and were collectively referred to as the Afghan Mujahideen. Shiite jihadists in Afghanistan were known as the Tehran Eight and received support from the Iranian government in fighting the Communist Afghan government and allied Soviet forces in Afghanistan.

=== Terrorism ===
Many Muslims, including scholars like al-Qaradawi and Sayyid Tantawi, denounced Islamic terrorist attacks against civilians, seeing them as contrary to rules of jihad that prohibit targeting noncombatants. After the September 11 attacks in 2001, the United States blamed Saudi Arabian Osama bin Laden and the Taliban in Afghanistan, triggering bin Laden, who in turn on October 7 issued a televised message, declaring "Allah had blessed a vanguard group of Muslims, the spearhead of Islam, to destroy America." American and British forces were deployed around Afghanistan, and Mullah Mohammad Omar, also the Commander to the Faithful of the Islamic Emirate of Afghanistan, in turn called the world's Muslims to join him in jihad. Justifying violence can be seen as incitement and mitigated with deradicalization.

==== Abdullah Azzam ====
In the 1980s Abdullah Azzam advocated waging jihad against the "unbelievers". Azzam issued a fatwa calling for jihad against the Soviet occupation of Afghanistan, declaring it an obligation for all able-bodied Muslims to repel invaders. His fatwa was endorsed by others, including Abd al-Aziz ibn Baz. Azzam saw Afghanistan as the beginning of jihad to repel unbelievers from many countries—the southern Soviet Republics of Central Asia, Bosnia, the Philippines, Kashmir, Somalia, Eritrea, Spain, and especially his home country of Palestine. The Soviet defeat in Afghanistan is said to have "amplified the jihadist tendency from a fringe phenomenon to a major force in the Muslim world." Many fighters returned to their home countries to continue jihad, participating in insurgencies and later creating a "transnational jihadist stream."

Azzam also argued for a broader interpretation of who it was permissible to kill, which may have influenced students such as bin Laden. He argued, based on his interpretation of the hadith, that it is a sin to not wage offensive jihad against the unbelievers in non-Muslim lands, continuing until only those who submit to Islam remain; expelling unbelievers from Muslim lands, contrastingly, is defensive jihad. In February 1998, bin Laden put a "Declaration of the World Islamic Front for Jihad against the Jews and the Crusaders" in the Al-Quds al-Arabi newspaper. He later organised the September 11 attacks against the United States.

=== Shia ===
In Shia Islam, jihad is one of the ten Practices of the Religion (though not one of the five pillars). Traditionally, Twelver Shi'a doctrine differed from that of Sunni Islam on the concept of jihad, with jihad seen as a "lesser priority" in Shia theology and "armed activism" by Shias "limited to a person's immediate geography".

Because of their history of oppression, Shias also associated jihad with certain passionate features, notably in the remembrance of Ashura. Mahmoud M. Ayoub says:

In Islamic tradition jihad or the struggle in the way of God, whether as armed struggle, or any form of opposition of the wrong, is generally regarded as one of the essential requirements of a person's faith as a Muslim. Shi'î tradition carried this requirement a step further, making jihad one of the pillars or foundations (arkan) of religion. If, therefore, Husayn's struggle against the Umayyad regime must be regarded as an act of jihad, then, In the mind of devotees, the participation of the community in his suffering and its ascent to the truth of his message must also be regarded as an extension of the holy struggle of the Imam himself. The hadith from which we took the title of this chapter stated this point very clearly. Ja'far al-Sadiq is said to have declared to al-Mufaddal, one of his closest disciples, 'The sigh of the sorrowful for the wrong done us is an act of praise (tasbih) [of God], his sorrow for us is an act of worship, and his keeping of our secret is a struggle (jihad) in the way of God'; the Imâm then added, 'This hadith should be inscribed in letters of gold'.

and

Hence, the concept of jihad (holy struggle) gained a deeper and more personal meaning. Whether through weeping, the composition and recitation of poetry, showing compassion and doing good to the poor or carrying arms, the Shi'i Muslim saw himself helping the Imam in his struggle against the wrong (zulm) and gaining for himself the same merit (thawab) of those who actually fought and died for him. The ta'ziyah, in its broader sense the sharing of the entire life of the suffering family of Muhammad, has become for the Shi'i community the true meaning of compassion.

In the Syrian civil war, Shia and Sunni fighters waged jihad against each other. In Yemen, the Houthi Movement used appeals to jihad as part of their ideology as well as their recruitment.

== Islamic jurisprudence ==
Observers have noted the evolution in the rules of jihad—from the original "classical" doctrine to that of 21st century Salafi jihadism. According to legal historian Sadarat Kadri, during the last few centuries, incremental changes in Islamic legal doctrine (developed by Islamists who otherwise condemn any bid'ah (innovation) in religion), "normalized" what was once "unthinkable". "The very idea that Muslims might blow themselves up for God was unheard of before 1983, and it was not until the early 1990s that anyone anywhere had justified killing innocent Muslims who were not on a battlefield."

The first or the "classical" doctrine of jihad which was developed towards the end of the 8th century, emphasized the jihad of the sword (jihad bil-saif) rather than the "jihad of the heart", but it contained many legal restrictions developed from interpretations of the Quran and the Hadith, such as detailed rules involving "the initiation, the conduct, the termination" of jihad, the treatment of prisoners, the distribution of booty, etc. Absent a sudden attack on the Muslim community, jihad was not a "personal obligation" (fard ayn); instead it was a "collective one" (fard al-kifaya), which had to be discharged "in the way of God" (fi sabil Allah), and could only be launched by the caliph, "whose discretion over its conduct was all but absolute." (This was designed in part to avoid incidents like the Kharijia's jihad against and killing of Caliph Ali, once they deemed that he was no longer a Muslim). Martyrdom resulting from an attack on the enemy with no concern for your own safety was praiseworthy, but dying by your own hand (as opposed to the enemy's) merited a special place in Hell. The collective obligation to jihad is sometimes simplified as "offensive jihad" in Western texts.

Islamic theologian Abu Abdullah al-Muhajir has been identified as the key theorist and ideologue behind modern jihadist violence. His theological and legal justifications influenced Abu Musab al-Zarqawi of al-Qaeda as well as jihadi terrorist groups, including ISIS. Zarqawi used a manuscript of al-Muhajir's ideas at AQI training camps that were later deployed by ISIS, referred to as The Jurisprudence of Jihad or The Jurisprudence of Blood.

The book has been described as rationalising "the murder of non-combatants" by Mark Towsend, citing Salah al-Ansari of Quilliam, who noted: "There is a startling lack of study and concern regarding this abhorrent and dangerous text The Jurisprudence of Blood in almost all Western and Arab scholarship". Charlie Winter of The Atlantic describes it as a "theological playbook used to justify the group's abhorrent acts". He stated:

Ranging from ruminations on the merits of beheading, torturing, or burning prisoners to thoughts on assassination, siege warfare, and the use of biological weapons, Muhajir's intellectual legacy is a crucial component of the literary corpus of ISIS—and, indeed, whatever comes after it—a way to render practically anything permissible, provided, that is, it can be spun as beneficial to the jihad. [...] According to Muhajir, committing suicide to kill people is not only a theologically sound act, but a commendable one, too, something to be cherished and celebrated regardless of its outcome. [...] neither Zarqawi nor his inheritors have looked back, liberally using Muhajir's work to normalize the use of suicide tactics in the time since, such that they have become the single most important military and terrorist method—defensive or offensive—used by ISIS today. The way that Muhajir theorized it was simple—he offered up a theological fix that allows any who desire it to sidestep the Koranic injunctions against suicide.

Psychologist Chris E. Stout claimed that jihadists regard their actions as "for the greater good"; that they are in a "weakened in the earth" situation that renders terrorism a valid resort.

== Usage ==
The term 'jihad' has accrued both violent and non-violent meanings. According to John Esposito, it can simply mean striving to live a moral and virtuous life, spreading and defending Islam as well as fighting injustice and oppression, among other things. The relative importance of the two forms of jihad is a matter of controversy. Rudoph Peters wrote that, in the contemporary world, traditionalist Muslims understand jihad from classical works on fiqh; modernist Muslims regard jihad as a just war in international law and emphasize its defensive aspects; and fundamentalists view it as an expansion of Islam and realization of Islamic ideals. David Cook wrote that Muslims understood jihad in a military sense, in both classical and contemporary texts. Cook located the idea that jihad is primarily non-violent in Sufi texts and the Western scholars who study them, or from Muslim apologists. Gallup stated that its surveys show that the concept of jihad among Muslims "is considerably more nuanced than the single sense in which Western commentators invariably invoke the term".

=== Muslim public opinion ===
A Gallup poll asked Muslims in eight countries to define jihad. In Lebanon, Kuwait, Jordan, and Morocco, the most frequent response was to "duty toward God", a "divine duty", or a "worship of God", with no military connotations. In Turkey, Iran, Pakistan and Indonesia, many of the responses includes "sacrificing one's life for the sake of Islam/God/a just cause" or "fighting against the opponents of Islam". Other common meanings of "jihad" in the Muslim world include "a commitment to hard work", "promoting peace", and "living the principles of Islam". The terminology was also applied to the fight for women's liberation.

=== Other struggles ===
Shia Muslim scholar Mahmoud M. Ayoud stated, "The goal of true jihad is to attain a harmony between Islam (submission), iman (faith), and ihsan (righteous living)." Jihad is a process encompassing both individual and social reform, this is called jihad fi sabil Allah ("struggle in the way of God"), and can be undertaken following the Qur'an (jihad bi-al-qur'an). According to Ayoud the greatest jihad is the struggle of every Muslim against social, moral, and political evils. However, depending on social and political circumstances, jihad may be regarded as a sixth fundamental obligation (farid) incumbent on the entire Muslim community (ummah) when their integrity is in danger, in this case jihad becomes an "absolute obligation" (fard 'ayn), or when social and religious reform is gravely hampered. Otherwise it is a "limited obligation" (fard kifayah), incumbent upon those who are directly involved. These rules apply to armed struggle or "jihad of the sword".

In modern times, Pakistani scholar and professor Fazlur Rahman Malik used the term to describe the struggle to establish a "just moral-social order", while President Habib Bourguiba of Tunisia used it to describe the struggle for economic development in that country.

According to the BBC, a third meaning of jihad is the struggle to build a good society. In a commentary of the hadith Sahih Muslim, entitled al-Minhaj, the medieval Islamic scholar Yahya ibn Sharaf al-Nawawi stated, "one of the collective duties of the community as a whole (fard kifaya) is to lodge a valid protest, to solve problems of religion, to have knowledge of Divine Law, to command what is right and forbid wrong conduct".

Scholar Natana J. DeLong-Bas lists a number of types of "jihad" that have been proposed by Muslims:

- educational jihad (jihad al-tarbiyyah);
- missionary jihad or calling the people to Islam (jihad al-da'wah)

Other "types" mentioned include:

- "Intellectual" jihad (similar to missionary jihad).
- "Economic" jihad (doing good involving money such as spending within one's means, helping the "poor and the downtrodden") Bourguiba used jihad to describe the struggle for economic development. Iran has a Ministry of Jihad for Agriculture, and formerly Jihad of Construction responsible for public works.
- Jihad Al-Nikah, or sexual jihad, "refers to women joining the jihad by offering sex to fighters to boost their morale". The term originated from a fatwa believed to have been fabricated by the Syrian government to discredit its opponents, and the prevalence of this phenomenon has been disputed.

==== Usage by some non-Muslims ====
- The United States Department of Justice used various ad hoc definitions of jihad in indictments of individuals involved in terrorist activities:
  - "As used in this First Superseding Indictment, jihad is the Arabic word meaning 'holy war'. In this context, jihad refers to the use of violence, including paramilitary action against persons, governments deemed to be enemies of the fundamentalist version of Islam."
  - "As used in this Superseding Indictment, 'violent jihad' or 'jihad' include planning, preparing for, and engaging in, acts of physical violence, including murder, maiming, kidnapping, and hostage-taking." in the indictment against several individuals including José Padilla.
- Karen Armstrong: "Fighting and warfare might sometimes be necessary, but it was only a minor part of the whole jihad or struggle".
- Maxime Rodinson: "Jihad is a propagandistic device which, as need be, resorts to armed struggle—two ingredients common to many ideological movements".
- Benjamin R. Barber used the term jihad to point out the resistant movement by fundamentalist ethnic groups who want to protect their traditions, heritage and identity from globalization (which he refers to as 'McWorld').

=== Other groups ===
==== Ahmadiyya ====
In Ahmadiyya Islam, jihad is primarily one's personal inner struggle and should not be used violently for political motives. Violence is only to be used to protect religion and one's own life in extreme situations of persecution.

==== Quranist ====
Quranists do not believe that the word jihad means holy war. They believe it means to struggle, or to strive. They believe it can incorporate both military and non-military aspects. When it refers to the military aspect, it is understood primarily to be defensive warfare.

== See also ==
- Ijtihad
- Islam and war
- Islamic military jurisprudence
- Jihadism and hip-hop
- Religious war
- Milkhemet Mitzvah
- Islamic Jihad
- Jihadism
