= Crusade (disambiguation) =

The Crusades were a series of religious wars launched by the Latin Catholic Church in the medieval period.

Crusade or Crusades may also refer to:

== Arts and entertainment ==
=== Comics ===
- Crusade, a Franco-Belgian comics series published by Le Lombard
- The Crusades (comics), a series of American comic books
- Crusade Comics, publisher founded by Billy Tucci

=== Films ===
- The Crusades (1935 film), a 1935 film directed by Cecil B. DeMille
- The Crusade (2021 film), a French drama film
- The Crusades (2023 film), an American comedy drama film

=== Games ===
- Darkness Falls: The Crusade, a 1999 internet MUD
- Wing Commander: The Secret Missions 2: Crusade, a computer game expansion pack

=== Literature ===
- Crusade (Anderson novel), the second book of the Destroyermen series by Taylor Anderson
- Crusade (Lowder novel), a novel by James Lowder
- Crusade (Laird novel), a 2007 historical novel by Elizabeth Laird
- Crusade (short story), a 1968 Arthur C. Clarke short story
- Crusade (Young novel), a 2007 novel by Robyn Young
- Crusade, a 2003 novel from the Aquasilva Trilogy, by Anselm Audley
- Crusade, a young-adult series by Nancy Holder and Debbie Viguié
- Crusade, a 1992 Starfire novel by David Weber and Steve White
- Crusade, The Untold Story of the Persian Gulf War (1993), a book by Rick Atkinson
- The Crusade, novelization of the TV serial Doctor Who

=== Music ===
- Crusade Records, an independent record label based in Sydney, Australia
- "Crusades", a song by August Burns Red from their 2009 album Constellations
- "The Crusade", a song by Lovebites from their 2018 EP Battle Against Damnation
- "Crusades", a song by Geese from their 2023 album 3D Country

==== Albums ====
- Crusade (album), a 1967 album by John Mayall and the Bluesbreakers
- Crusades (album), an album by The Plastic Constellations
- The Crusade (album), a 2006 album by Trivium

=== Television ===
- "Crusade" (Stargate SG-1), an episode from the science fiction TV series
- Crusade (TV series), a short-lived 1999 American science fiction spinoff from Babylon 5
- Crusades (TV series), a British television series hosted by Terry Jones
- The Crusade (Doctor Who), four episode serial from Doctor Who
- WHAS Crusade for Children, an annual telethon broadcast in Louisville, Kentucky

== Organizations ==
- Campus Crusade for Christ, the former name of Cru, an American interdenominational Christian mission organization
- Crusade of Romanianism, a Romanian fascist party

== Other uses ==
- Crusade (horse), an American-bred, Irish-trained Thoroughbred racehorse

== See also ==
- Crusader (disambiguation)
