= James Fogarty =

British musician

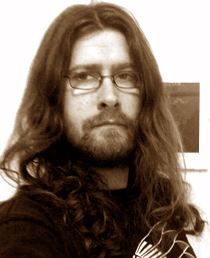
James Fogarty

James Fogarty is an English multi-media artist. Concentrating mainly on music crossing over between metal and sampled based music, his projects past and present are In the Woods..., the Blacksmoke Organisation, the Bombs of Enduring Freedom, Ewigkeit, Jaldaboath (both as a solo artist and founding member of the Meads of Asphodel) and producing occasional releases for Death to Music productions. He also contributed artwork to the Cautese National Postal Disservice in the book Stamps of Mass Destruction (and other postal disasters) Vol 2 (ISBN 1-871894-97-2), printed in 2005.

He plays guitar, keyboards and is a singer.

== Blacksmoke (a.k.a. the Blacksmoke Organisation) ==
In 2003, Fogarty co-founded the "occasional art collective" called the Blacksmoke Organisation, generally referred to as Blacksmoke, along with James Cauty (the KLF, K Foundation, Cautese Nationál Postal Disservice). Credits include official remixes of a-ha ("Cosy Prisons"), the Bloodhound Gang ("Foxtrot Uniform Charlie Kilo"), Goldie Lookin' Chain ("RnB"), Cradle of Filth ("Mannequin") and two tracks on the soundtrack to Disney's Herbie: Fully Loaded.

== Ewigkeit ==
Fogarty's initial recording project was Ewigkeit (1997–2007), for which he recorded and wrote all the music. Recording a total of five albums, the last two - Radio Ixtlan (2004) and Conspiritus (2005) - were released through the UK label Earache Records.

The track "It's Not Reality" was featured on the PlayStation 2 video game Extreme Metal Racing, as well as being remixed by hardcore techno producer Scott Brown. In 2007, Ewigkeit was ended (as reported by Blabbermouth), and following this, Fogarty founded a new project called the Bombs of Enduring Freedom.

== The Bombs of Enduring Freedom ==
Formed in 2007, the music of the Bombs of Enduring Freedom is a mix of industrial metal and modern electronic music. Their self-titled debut album was featured in a two-page article in the UK's Metal Hammer magazine. Further EPs have been released.

In 2008, the Bombs of Enduring Freedom remixed the track "Survival of the Outlaw" by Norwegian black metal band Solefald for their remix album The Circular Drain. In 2011, a video was made for a track called "Bin Laden Is Dead" by Matthias Fritsch (the filmmaker behind Techno Viking).

As well as limited-edition CD releases, all material is available to download for free from the band's website.

== Jaldaboath / The Meads of Asphodel ==
In 1998, Fogarty co-founded the experimental black metal band the Meads of Asphodel under the pseudonym of Jaldaboath, for whom he wrote and recorded the band's demos, the debut album The Excommunication of Christ and the Jihad EP (a split EP with Norwegian black metal band Mayhem which gained 'Single of the Week' in Kerrang! magazine). In 2003, Fogarty left the project to concentrate fully on Ewigkeit.

In 2008, Fogarty formed a new project called 'Jaldaboath' - the music is comical in nature, taking inspiration from Monty Python, Black Adder and various subgenres of heavy metal. Austria's Napalm Records released the debut full-length album The Rise of the Heraldic Beasts worldwide in September 2010. The CD was also released via Death to Music Productions as a limited edition.

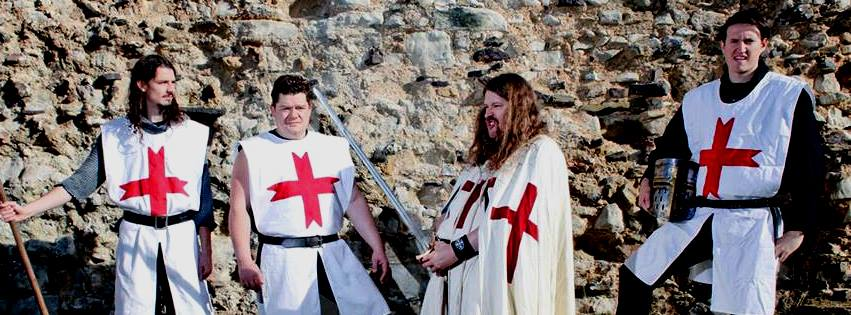
Jaldaboath

== Death to Music productions ==
Fogarty founded 'Death to Music', a netlabel with occasional limited edition releases. The majority of the releases are MP3 downloads.
