= We Still Have The Stars =

Studio album by The Resonance Association
- Released: November 2008
- Recorded: January – August 2008
- Genre: Dark ambient, electronica, krautrock, drone
- Length: 45:26
- Label: mrsvee recordings

The Resonance Association chronology
Failure Of The Grand Design (2007)	We Still Have The Stars (2008)	Clarity In Darkness (2010)

We Still Have The Stars is the second album by The Resonance Association, and was released via their own label mrsvee recordings in November 2008 as both a free download and heavyweight vinyl. The promotional campaign for We Still Have The Stars saw tracks on the cover CDs of Terrorizer ("None More Evil") and Classic Rock Presents Prog ("The Moment Has Passed"), as well as features in local press and a number of smaller music websites. Downwithfreedom.com also provided a surrealistic animated promo video for "None More Evil" which appeared on YouTube in March 2009.

Terrorizer praised the album’s "genre hopping exploration of sounds" and Classic Rock described it as "a challenging and enjoyable listen". Heathen Harvest, who had already given the band’s debut a glowing review, re-introduced the band to its readers as "England’s wonderful new sensation", whilst DPRP in giving the album 9/10 concluded that "the duo carves a sound all their own".

In 2010, We Still Have The Stars was rereleased digitally with 3 bonus tracks.

== Track listing ==
All music is composed by Daniel Vincent & Dominic Hemy; lyrics for Unite by Scott Fuller.

No.	Title	Length
1.	"After The Storm"	0:48
2.	"We Still Have The Stars"	6:56
3.	"Path Of Totality"	5:32
4.	"None More Evil"	5:44
5.	"Unite"	3:12
6.	"Midnight Highway/The Grand Misunderstanding"	8:03
7.	"Subatomic Zoo"	3:26
8.	"The Moment Has Passed"	11:42

2010 Digital Bonus Tracks
No.	Title	Length
9.	"Standard Deviation (Demo)"	5:30
10.	"Who's Been Thinking Bad Thoughts? (Demo)"	4:34
11.	"Losing The Stars"	4:58

== Credits ==
Written, recorded and produced by The Resonance Association except Unite, written by TRA and Scott Fuller. Recorded under the stars January 2008 - August 2008. Mastered by Christopher Hemy September 2008.

Artwork and design by Carl Glover for aleph studio.
