= History of Guns =

History Of Guns
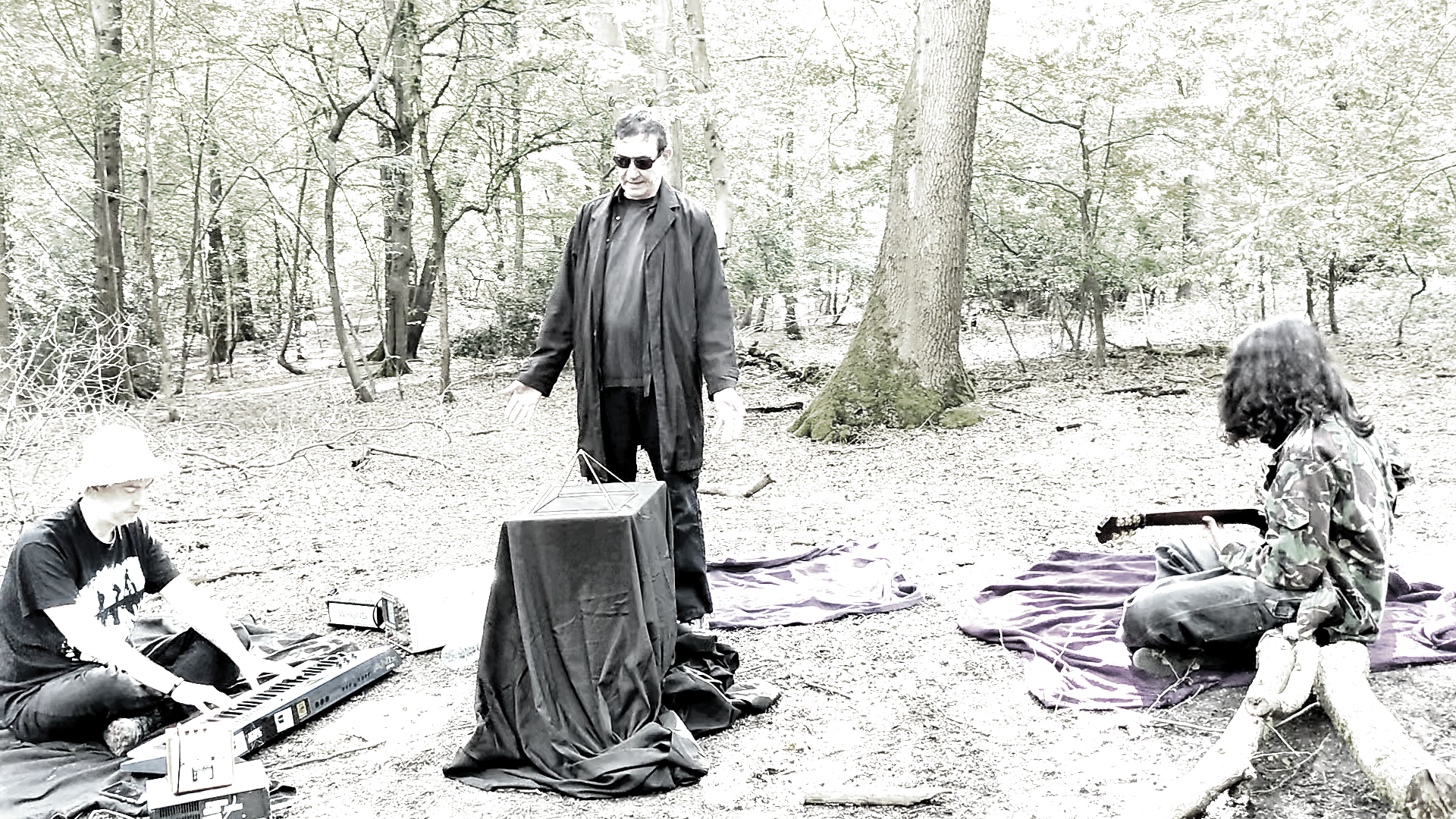
- From the video to When You Don't Matter

Background information
- Origin: United Kingdom
- Genres: metamodernism; Industrial; ebm; punk; dance; goth; alternative rock; indie
- Years active: 1996 – current
- Label: Liquid Len Records/Line Out Records
- Members: Del Alien; Max Rael; Caden Clarkson; Jamu (James)Knight; Gary Hughes; Ámon Ássentir; Chris White
- Past members: Stagger Lee, Fester Schuster, The Goose, Kevin Gerrish
- Website: historyofguns.org

History Of Guns is an English metamodern cross-genre group combining elements of Industrial, punk, electronica, ebm, edm, goth, rock, metal and avant-garde from Hertfordshire, England. They were a part of the early 00s underground UK industrial/gothic scene before going on hiatus in 2011 and returning in 2022.

Their name comes from the title of one of their earliest songs, written from an imagined future where guns no longer exist, about the Dunblane massacre.

Primarily a studio project, History of Guns played live sporadically throughout their career including the Whitby Goth Weekend in 2006 and both London UK Industrial events: Futurepunk23 and Back to the Futurepunk.

They contributed the track Jezebel and the Philistines to the debut album The Excommunication of Christ by The Meads of Asphodel in 2001, and further contributed to their subsequent releases Jihad / Freezing Moon (2002), Exhuming the Grave of Yeshua (2003) and Damascus Steel (2005). (credited as either History Of Guns or Max Rael).

In 2007, their song Your Obedient Servants came in at no.19 in journalist Mick Mercer's list of Top 30 Goth Singles of All Time.

In August 2015 they were featured in the Beautiful Noise exhibition at Hertford Museum of notable bands from the area.

After going on hiatus in 2011 they returned in 2022 with an industrial rock/metal album Forever Dying in Your Eyes, and long-planned album Half Light in 2024. They are currently working on a new album to be titled, Rage and Reflect.

== History ==
=== Phase One: Beginning (1996–2000) ===
History of Guns was formed in February 1996 as 'Pre-Hate Machine' by Stagger Lee with Max Rael and Del Alien. Del Alien renamed the band 'History of Guns' after a song he had written about the Dunblane Massacre in mid 1996.

Their first demo Reformation Day was recorded in a day at Discipline Studios in Tottenham in July 1996. The band signed up with Top Knotch Management in 1997 and recorded a second demo Sold on Secrets in Chelmsford. In 1999, the band acquired a PC, and began recording with Cubase. The first track "Random Death Bag" which appeared on the third instalment of the No Holy Additive compilation CD from Godreah Zine. The band created an unreleased demo album for potential record labels called Enough Is Too Much described as "Fatboy Slim meets Joy Division."

In February 2000 History Of Guns released their debut single Little Miss Suicide, a pop critique on how mental health was trivialised in the late 90s. The title, a reference to the popular “Mr. Men and Little Miss” children's book series by British author Roger Hargreaves sarcastically underscoring how seriously the band felt young adults with mental health issues were taken at the time.

=== Phase Two: Liquid Len Records (2001–2006) ===
History of Guns released two EPs Disconnect and The Mirror Pond prior to their debut album Flashes of Light LP in 2004. A dense slab of atmospheric dark electronica devoid of any guitars, noted for its unusual structure of having two long opening songs, four short middle songs, then two long closing songs.

Recruiting a live band in 2004 History of Guns performed gigs around the south east of England as an edgy punk band, not performing any of the songs from their debut album. The last date was filmed and released on DVD as "Twenty Seven Paces".

Their second album Apophenia was released in November 2005. It was named after the medical condition of seeing patterns in seemingly random data, apophenia. This time the album was structured in two distinct halves, and every track on the album written and performed in a different genre.

In April 2006, they performed at Whitby Goth Weekend.

Line Out Records announced they had signed History Of Guns on 10 November 2006.

=== Phase Three: Line Out Records (2007–2011) ===
History of Guns' third album ACEDIA was released on 7 July 2008 on Line Out Records and was awarded 9/10 by Rock Sound on 3 July 2008. The album title came from the lyrics to Of Walking Abortion by Manic Street Preachers from their The Holy Bible album The inside sleeve artwork features a copy of No Longer Human by Osamu Dazai. Downwithfreedom.com provided an animated music video for the track 'Exhaust Fumes' which appeared on YouTube in October 2008.

In April 2008, Line Out Records sponsored the Whitby Gothic Weekend bi-annual football tournament so teams were competing for, 'The History of Guns – Acedia Challenge Cup'.

In July 2009, History of Guns released a three track EP focussing on The Spice Girls, featuring Slice Up Your Wife which incorporated elements of the original Spice Girls song Spice Up Your Life described by The Dreaded Press as "a sub-three-minute slice of staggering satire and vengeful rage"

On 21 October 2011, the band released their fourth album, Whatever You Do, Don't Turn Up at Twelve and then went on hiatus.

=== Phase Four: Forever Dying, Half Light, Drug Castle (2022 – current) ===
History Of Guns returned with new guitarist Jamu with the industrial rock/metal flavoured album Forever Dying in Your Eyes (Eight Songs for Turning a Corner) in August 2022.

Originally begun in 2008, the album Half Light was released on the summer solstice 2024. A metamodernist exploration of existentialism triggered by the Robert Anton Wilson quote "The future is up for grabs; it belongs to any and all who will take the risk and accept the responsibility of consciously creating the future they want" which saw the band reconnecting with the dark electronic sound established in the Flashes of Light debut two decades ago.

On 2 September 2024 History Of Guns released the short film Drug Castle directed by Howard Gardner in which the band recreate one of an alleged series of psychological experiments undertaken at an unnamed British beach from the mid twentieth century followed by a reinterpretation of both the song and the video, Last Train to Drug Castle, further exploring the Drug Castle narrative.

== Former/past member(s) ==
- Fester: Guitar (2004–2007)
- Stagger Lee: bass guitar (1996–1999)
- Kevin Gerrish: bass guitar (2002)
- Goose: bass guitar (on and off 2003–2006)

== Discography ==
=== Studio albums ===
- Flashes of Light LP (2004)
- Apophenia (2006)
- Acedia (2008)
- Album Four: Whatever You Do, Don't Turn Up at Twelve (2011)
- Forever Dying in Your Eyes (2022)
- Half Light (2024)

=== EPs ===
- Little Miss Suicide EP (1999)
- Disconnect EP (2002)
- The Mirror Pond EP (2003)

=== Free release series ===
- Apospemia - A Collection of B-sides LENCD10, 2005
- Issue One - Udders Free CD EP, March 2006
- Issue Two - Electricity Is the Answer Free CD EP, May 2006
- Issue Three - Poke Face Free CD EP, July 2006
- Issue Four - Whitby October 2006 Promo Free CD EP, October 2006
- Issue Five - All The Natural Beauty of a Golf Course Free CD EP, April 2007
- Issue Six - Make It Look Like An Accident : ARCHIVE ONE Free CD EP, October 2007
- Empty Eyes (single mix)/Killing Myself Until I Die (excerpt) Free CD single, April 2008
- Empty Eyes / ...But I'll Be Waiting Free CD/download single, August 2008
- It's Easy (To Go Blind) *alternate version* / Exhaust Fumes *remix* Free CD/download single, October 2008
- The Spice Girls EP Free CD/download EP, April 2009
- Vol2Iss1: Never More Alive Than on the Eve of Death Free download, ZSM012, July 2012
- Vol2Iss2: Guns at Dawn Free download, ZSM018, April 2013

=== DVDs ===
- Twenty Seven Paces LENDVD1 2005

=== Demos ===
- Reformation Day Demo, 1996
- Sold on Secrets Demo, 1997
- Enough Is Too Much Demo Album, 1999

=== Compilations ===
- Contains no Holy Additives Vol.2, Neat Records, 1999
- Contains no Holy Additives Vol.3, Neat Records, 2000
- Contains no Holy Additives Vol.4, FAFF03, Godreah Records, 2001
- Tribal Sin, 2001
- Daze of the Underground, 2003
- DarkCell 01, 2003
- This Is Industrial Punk, 2005
- Line Out & Chums Vol. 1, 2006
- Lined Up vol. 1, 2007
- This Is Industrial Punk Vol.2, 2010

=== Remixes ===
(as Remixing artists)

- Fish (ex-Marillion) – 3 History of Guns remixes included on the Fellini Days Companion CD, 2001
- Jo McCafferty – Vanessa – Raelism Remix 2002 (unreleased)
- Xykogen – Mutate And Survive – History of Guns Remix 2006
- Psychophile – All in the Mind – History of Guns Remix 2006
- Reincarnation Fish – Homeless Samurai – History of Guns, The Farmers Have Won Mix 2007
- Xykogen – Terminology – History of Guns Remix 2007

(as artists being Remixed)

- LMS – Track Little Miss Suicide Remixed by Gary Hughes 2001
- Spoonburn – Track Moonburn remixed by Daniel Vincent 2004
- Blown Out – Track Blown remixed by The Resonance Association vs History of Guns 2007
