= Ewigkeit =

- Genres: Industrial metal, black metal, progressive metal, avant-garde metal, electronic music
- Years active: 1994–2007, 2013–present
- Labels: Beverina; Casus Belli; CD-Maximum; Death to Music; Earache; Eldethorn; Metal Age; Mospharic; Soyuz; Svart
- Members: James Fogarty

Ewigkeit is the musical project of English artist James Fogarty, a.k.a. Mr. Fog, from Brighton. Having released five studio albums, on 28 March 2007, Fogarty announced the end of the project on Blabbermouth, the Death To Music website, and also on Myspace, but revived it in 2012.

== Band history ==
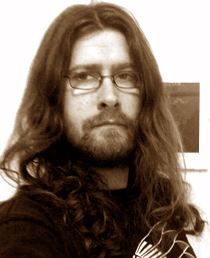
James Fogarty

The one-man project tried to forge a unique sound. After the release of the first album, Battle Furies, on Neat Records subsidiary Eldethorn, Fogarty donated his music collection to an Oxfam charity shop so that he would be free of influences. Starscape was received well by the extreme music press, but the label folded and the project went on hiatus. Ewigkeit concentrated on his other black metal project, The Meads of Asphodel, and his collaboration with Jimmy Cauty on multi-media project Blacksmoke. In 2003, Land of Fog was released on Metal Age Productions. Fogarty regarded it as the first Ewigkeit album. He signed to Earache Records, which released Radio Ixtlan in 2004.

Released in 2005, Conspiritus (mixed by John Fryer), a concept album examining conspiracy theories, has been hailed by many as "marking a maturation of Ewigkeit's eclectic sound". That year, a music video was made with filmmaker Anthony Gates for the track "Its Not Reality". Fogarty's worked for over 14 months on the album, researching conspiracy theories. It is the most researched album on this subject. Along with traditional music website / magazine promotion and distribution, it was sold through the website of conspiracy researcher David Icke.

In 2006, Ewigkeit made a live video recording entitled Ewigkeit - Live From A Bunker, which displayed the project in a live setting acting as a free "online" gig - the 25 minute set (filmed in a Nuclear Bunker in the vicinity of Brighton, England) was uploaded to Google video. Also recorded was a free download MP3 EP, Return to the Land of Fog.

In December 2006, Fogerty burned all his recording contracts. All previous Ewigkeit material was then made available at Deathtomusic.com. In January 2007, Death to Music Productions gave away a remastered and superior version of Battle Furies. In March 2007, Starscape was available free, with the intention that all material will be fully released online.

In March 2007, James Fogarty abandoned the Ewigkeit project, stating in the press-release, "... [metal] is mostly out-of-date, out-of-touch with its origins and (worst of all) conservative in the extreme..."

An online link to Fogerty's new project, The Bombs of Enduring Freedom, was created with the debut self-titled album released in December 2007, and an EP Kalashikovs and Car Bombs, followed in 2008. During this time, he also produced the Old Forest album Tales of the Sussex Weald.

In 2012 Ewigkeit was reactivated, with a black metal sound, and two more studio albums were released: Back to Beyond in August 2012, and Cosmic Man (July 2017). In 2017, the band fully re-recorded its 1997 album, Battle Furies, and re-released it as Battle Furies 2.017, on CD via Death to Music Productions, and on vinyl via Beverina Productions and Casus Belli Musica. A new EP, Depopulate, was released on 23 January 2021.

== Etymology ==
Ewigkeit was the name given to this music project when Fogerty found the word in the English Concise Oxford Dictionary. A little known "imported" word, hardly used in the English language at all, Ewigkeit means 'eternity' in German. He has been known in interviews to say that in retrospect, it was the worst name he could have chosen.

== Discography ==
- Faery Lands Forlorn demo (1995, self-released)
- Beyond Realms Unknown demo (1996, self-released)
- Dwellers on the Threshold demo (1996, self-released / Death to Music Productions)
- Battle Furies (1997, Eldethorn / Death to Music Productions)
- Starscape (1999, Eldethorn)
- Music for the New Millenium demo (2000, self-released)
- Land of Fog (2003, Metal Age Productions / CD-Maximum)
- Radio Ixtlan (2004, Earache Records / Soyuz Music)
- Conspiritus (2005, Earache Records / Союз)
- Return to the Land of Fog (2006, Death to Music Productions)
- Lost Yet Not Forgotten (2008, Death to Music Productions)
- Back to Beyond (2013, Death to Music Productions)
- Cosmic Man (2017, Svart Records)
- Battle Furies 2.017 (2017, Death to Music Productions / Beverina Productions / Casus Belli Musica)
- Starscape 2.019 (2019, Death to Music Productions)
- DISClose (2019, Death to Music Productions)
- Declassified (2019, Death to Music Productions)
- Land of Fog (20/20 Re-Vision) (2020, Death to Music Productions)
- Depopulate (2021, Mospharic)

Ewigkeit has appeared on various compilation albums, notably:

- Metal Hammer covermount Earache Sampler CD (2004)
- Black Light Magazine CD sampler
- No Holy Additives vol. 2,3 & 4
- Metal Age Productions sampler CD
- Britannia Infernus
- Metal: A Headbangers Companion
