= In the name of God =

In the name of God may refer to:

- Sa Ngalan ng Diyos, a Tagalog-language novel's title meaning "In The Name of God"
- Basmala, an Arabic phrase meaning "In the name of God, the Merciful, the Compassionate"
- "In the Name of God", an episode of Touched by an Angel
- Ram ke Naam (English: In the name of God) a 1992 Indian documentary film by Anand Patwardhan
- In the Name of God (1925 film), a Soviet Azerbaijani propaganda film
- In the Name of God (2007 film), an Urdu-language film
- In the Name of God (2024 film), a Swedish horror thriller film
- In the Name of God (TV series), a 2021 Indian web series
- In the name of God (sculpture), a project launched by Jens Galschiøt
- "In the Name of God (Deus Vult)", a song by Powerwolf from the album Preachers of the Night
- "In the Name of God", a song by Sabaton from the album Attero Dominatus
- "In the Name of God", a song by Dream Theater from the album Train of Thought
- "In the Name of God", a song by Slayer from the album Diabolus in Musica

== See also ==
- Names of God
- In the name of God, go, phrase
- In the Name of God, Welcome to Planet Genocide, a 2006 EP by The Meads of Asphodel
