= The Resonance Association =

English dark ambient band

- The Resonance Association

Background information
- Origin: London, England
- Genres: Dark ambient Electronica; Krautrock; Drone; Progressive Rock
- Years active: 2006–present
- Labels: mrs.vee recordings, Burning Shed, Imaginary Nightlife
- Members: Daniel Vincent; Dominic Hemy
- Website: trahq.co.uk

The Resonance Association is an English dark ambient band formed in 2006, brought together the pairing of Daniel Vincent (lead guitars, keyboards, sequencing) and Dominic Hemy (guitars, theremin, electronics) to create music that combines emotive guitar solos, dense atmospherics and blistering industrial rhythms. The band's music falls into a number of different categories including ambient, goth, noise, chill out, dark, krautrock and experimental.

== Failure of the Grand Design ==
A mere 18 months after inception, Failure of the Grand Design was the band's first full album release in October 2007 on the famed art-rock indie label Burning Shed. Described as "the best and most intense album released in 2007" by music website Cool Noise (where it was also named as "album of the year"); progressive site DPRP concluded that the band had "a unique sound devoid, for the most part, of any similarity to other bands" in its favourable review.

Graphic artist Carl Glover joined the band's creative team for the release of Failure of the Grand Design, using Lisa Vincent's photographs and the band's concepts to create the sleeve. This creative pairing continued with Carl contributing to other projects.

== We Still Have The Stars ==
We Still Have The Stars, on the band's own mrs.vee recordings label, was released in November 2008 as a free download and collectible heavyweight vinyl. The promotional campaign for We Still Have The Stars saw tracks on the cover CDs of Terrorizer ("None More Evil") and Classic Rock Presents Prog ("The Moment Has Passed"), as well as features in local press and a number of smaller music websites.

Terrorizer praised the album's "genre hopping exploration of sounds" and Classic Rock described it as "a challenging and enjoyable listen". Heathen Harvest, who had already given the band's debut a glowing review, re-introduced the band to its readers as "England’s wonderful new sensation", whilst DPRP in giving the album 9/10 concluded that "the duo carves a sound all their own".

== Clarity In Darkness ==
Recording for the third album Clarity In Darkness began in the spring of 2009, with the first clips appearing on the new website. The first track "Dangerous Fantasist" then appeared as the b-side to the last single from the We Still Have The Stars album, "The Moment Has Passed" in June 2009. The album saw a January 2010 release, and again garnered many favourable reviews; in print Terrorizer hailed that "fans of the Drone Zone will dig this ... a release that takes time to catch, but when it does it's impressive" and Rock-a-Rolla magazine described the album as "classic prog meets ambient meets drone meets industrial ... [Clarity In Darkness] definitely has its moments, strangely stuck in some parallel dimension between the 80s and the avant world of today"; whilst in the online world once again DPRP were enthusiastic, this time with a 10/10 review stating "I can think of no room for improvement from this awesome band", and The Music Fix commented "it does shredding, it does doom, it does prog and it does all of them spectacularly well. It's an album born of tremendous creativity that makes a distinct emotional connection throughout - even if sometimes those emotions may make you want to hide under a large cushion".

== Heliopause ==
In June 2010, the EP Helipause Prelude was released on the mrs.vee recordings label as a precursor to the forthcoming album Heliopause; on the back of this release the band appeared in the September issue of Classic Rock Presents Prog in the "On The Threshold..." feature, and the EP received a very positive review in the same issue "...if the aggressive, doom-laden title track is the biggest indicator of where The Resonance Association are heading with Heliopause, then rest assured there is little chance of an anti-climax."

The release was also backed up with the band's most notable live performances to date. On 8 October the band opened the 2010 edition of Summer's End festival supporting Jem Godfrey's and Pete Trewavas' new band Defence Of The Realm; Powerplay magazine wrote "...displayed their vision of musical soundscapes, pulsating, hypnotic, rhythmic music featuring some euphoric rhythm and lead work, which filled the room... the band couldn’t fail to impress" whilst Classic Rock Presents Prog "there is something undoubtedly engaging about the throbbing space prog in which Daniel Vincent and Dominic Hemy engage."

Heliopause was released 17 October 2011.

== Discography ==
=== Albums ===
- Failure Of The Grand Design (2007, Burning Shed)
- We Still Have The Stars (2008, mrsvee)
- Clarity In Darkness (2010, mrsvee)
- Heliopause (2011, mrsvee)

=== EPs and singles ===
- Volume One (2006, Archive Free Download)
- Appendix One (2006, Archive Free Download)
- Volume Two (2006, Archive Free Download)
- Appendix Two (2007, Archive Free Download)
- Northern Coastline Soundtrack (2007, Last.fm free download)
- The Grand Design EP (2007, Burning Shed Free Download)
- Dronezero (2008, mrsvee)
- The Moment Has Passed (2009, mrsvee)
- No Secrets, Only Codes (2010, mrsvee)
- Heliopause Prelude (2010, mrsvee)
- CR0 (2010, mrsvee)
