= The Mill Hill Sessions =

Studio album by The Meads of Asphodel
- Released: 2004
- Genre: Black metal
- Length: 49:01
- Label: Godreah Records

The Meads of Asphodel chronology
Exhuming the Grave of Yeshua (2003)	The Mill Hill Sessions (2004)	Damascus Steel (2005)

The Mill Hill Sessions is a live album released by the black metal band The Meads of Asphodel. It was released on Godreah Records in 2004, unlike the before releases which were released on Supernal Music. Two live sessions were recorded at the Mill Hill studios in North London in 2006. On 24.11.03 featuring various old tracks plus a cover of Sepultura's "Refuse/Resist". The second, 17.7.04, was a 25-minute work in progress jam featuring Hawkwind Huw Lloyd Langton on lead/slide guitar. The "My Beautiful Genocide" track was aired here for the first time in its pre production format.

== Track listing ==
No.	Title	Length
1.	"God Is Rome"	2:41
2.	"Grisly Din of Killing Steel"	5:06
3.	"80 Grains of Sand"	6:05
4.	"The Watchers of Catal Huyuk"	3:53
5.	"A Healer Made God"	5:46
6.	"Refuse/Resist (Sepultura cover)"	2:59
7.	"My Beautiful Genocide"	23:00
