= Damascus Steel (album) =

Studio album by The Meads of Asphodel
- Released: October 31, 2005
- Genres: Experimental metal, black metal
- Length: 61:25
- Label: Supernal Music

The Meads of Asphodel chronology
| The Mill Hill Sessions (2004) | Damascus Steel (2005) | In the Name of God, Welcome to Planet Genocide (2006) |

Damascus Steel is the third full-length studio album by the United Kingdom-based experimental black metal band The Meads of Asphodel. It was their last album to feature contributions from Max Rael (History of Guns).

== Track listing ==
1. "Psalm 666 (Intro)" - 2:32
2. "Creed of Abraham" - 5:46
3. "Hollow Womb of Suicide" - 2:53
4. "Sword of the East" - 6:53
5. "Satanic Black Nubian Pharaohs" - 6:39
6. "Wonderful World" - 2:17
7. "The Gods Who Mock Us" - 5:27
8. "Behold the Kindred Battle Carcasses Strewn Across the Bloodied Dunes of Gilgamesh Mute in the Frenzied Clamour of Death's Rolling Tongue and Ravenous Bursting Steel" - 11:01
9. "Beyond Death and Darkness" - 17:57
- "Sword of the East" is a cover of a song done by Hawkwind.
- "Wonderful World" is a cover of the song done by Louis Armstrong, with the lyrics being almost completely changed.
- "Beyond Death and Darkness" is a bonus track that is an updated version of a song found on the Metatron and the Gleaming Red Serpent demo.
