= Clarity In Darkness =

Studio album by The Resonance Association
- Released: 4 January 2010
- Recorded: 2009
- Genre: Dark ambient, electronica, krautrock, drone
- Length: 1:07:07
- Label: mrsvee recordings

The Resonance Association chronology
We Still Have The Stars (2008)	Clarity In Darkness (2010)	Heliopause (2011)

Clarity In Darkness is the third album by The Resonance Association, and the second to be released on their own label mrsvee recordings in January 2010. Once again, reviews were positive; Terrorizer hailed that "fans of the Drone Zone will dig this ... a release that takes time to catch, but when it does it's impressive" and Rock-a-Rolla magazine described the album as "classic prog meets ambient meets drone meets industrial ... [Clarity In Darkness] definitely has its moments, strangely stuck in some parallel dimension between the 80s and the avant world of today"; whilst in the online world once again DPRP were enthusiastic, this time with a 10/10 review stating "I can think of no room for improvement from this awesome band", and The Music Fix commented "it does shredding, it does doom, it does prog and it does all of them spectacularly well. It's an album born of tremendous creativity that makes a distinct emotional connection throughout - even if sometimes those emotions may make you want to hide under a large cushion".

== Track listing ==
All music is composed by Daniel Vincent & Dominic Hemy.

No.	Title	Length
1.	"Dangerous Fantasist"	4:58
2.	"Medal Of Dishonour"	7:47
3.	"Magick Is The Science"	6:40
4.	"Heart Of Chaos"	20:37
5.	"How To Recognise Angels"	1:44
6.	"Pearlescence"	7:11
7.	"Clarity In Darkness"	18:07

== Credits ==
All tracks written and performed by The Resonance Association:
Daniel Vincent - guitar, synths, drums, vocals, electronics
Dominic Hemy - guitar, bass, drums, theremin, electronics

Produced and mixed by Daniel Vincent.
Additional recording and production by Dominic Hemy.
Audio mastering by Dominic Hemy.

Sleeve design, photography and art direction by Carl Glover.
