= Heliopause (album) =

Studio album by The Resonance Association
- Released: 17 October 2011
- Recorded: 2010–2011
- Genre: Dark ambient, electronica, krautrock, drone
- Label: mrsvee recordings

The Resonance Association chronology
Clarity In Darkness (2010)	Heliopause (2011)

Heliopause is the fourth album by The Resonance Association, and the third to be released on their own label mrsvee recordings in October 2011. Reviews were mixed; Echoes & Dust said "[they] have produced a soundtrack to a film that does not exist. This is not a derisory comment, the film should exist and if it matched the music on offer over the albums 74 minutes, it would be intense, eventful and at times mesmerising". while Incendiary Magazine commented "...it’s long, indulgent and painstaking in its thoroughness and dedication: and not everything will be for you. But the good bits are very good indeed.".

== Track listing ==
All music is composed by Daniel Vincent & Dominic Hemy.

No.	Title	Length
1.	"Heliopause Part One"	4:42
2.	"Heliopause Part Two"	9:19
3.	"Face The Eschaton"	5:23
4.	"Momentum"	2:49
5.	"Another Place"	4:30
6.	"Memory Fade To Silver"	7:04
7.	"(by the light of the moon)"	1:39
8.	"Midnight Square"	6:49
9.	"Methods Of Control"	4:09
10.	"(passive waves)"	1:40
11.	"Penultimate Dream Sequence"	6:18
12.	"Single Point of Failure"	8:22
13.	"Departing"	7:56
14.	"Heliopause Part Three"	2:49

== Credits ==
All tracks written and performed by The Resonance Association:
Daniel Vincent - guitar, synths, drums, vocals, electronics
Dominic Hemy - guitar, bass, drums, theremin, electronics

Produced by Daniel Vincent.
Mixed and mastered by MJ Strange.

Photography by Daniel Vincent.
Art direction by Carl Glover.
