= Exhuming the Grave of Yeshua =

Studio album by The Meads of Asphodel
- Released: September 22, 2003
- Genre: Black metal
- Length: 54:53
- Label: Supernal Music

The Meads of Asphodel chronology
The Bulldozer Armageddon Vol. V (2003)	Exhuming the Grave of Yeshua (2003)	The Mill Hill Sessions (2004)

Exhuming the Grave of Yeshua is the second full length studio album from the black metal band The Meads of Asphodel. It was released on Supernal Music in 2003. This album was the first to feature the new line up of J D Tait and Deaorth [Ragnarok] sharing the bass duties with Hawkwind’s Alan Davey. Huw Lloyd langton plays lead guitar and Vincent Crowley from Acheron does some narration, and Max Rael from History of Guns and Mirai from Sigh play keyboards. A Rabbi from Golders Green in London added some Hebrew verse on the track 80 grains of Sand. Paul Carter from Thus Defiled played keyboards on the track "Sons of Anak Rise".

== Track listing ==
1. Intro - Exhuming the Grave of Yeshua - 2:22
2. God Is Rome - 2:04
3. Blood Blasted Holy War - 7:13
4. 80 Grains of Sand - 7:14
5. Guts for Sale - 4:26
6. Utopia - 4:16
7. A Healer Made God - 5:36
8. Sons of Anak Rise - 6:45
9. Sluts of the Netherworld - 4:15
10. On Graven Images I Glide Beyond the Monstrous Gates of Pandemonium to Face the Baptized Warriors of Yahweh in the Skull Littered Plain of Esdraelon - 10:42
