= In the name of God, go =

British political phrase

"In the name of God, go" is a phrase in British politics, its use potentially dating from the era of the English Civil War. The phrase may have been first used by Oliver Cromwell in the 17th Century. The phrase originates from a speech allegedly spoken by Cromwell during the forced dissolution of the Rump Parliament in 1653. The most popular attribution of this speech is that Cromwell were to have spoken the words, "You have sat too long for any good you have been doing lately. Depart, I say, and let us have done with you. In the name of God, go!". However, the attribution of the phrase may have been a later construct or a forgery, as there is a lack of credible sources for the complete events of the Dissolution of the Rump Parliament in 1653.. The phrase, and its attribution to Cromwell, has been in usage since at least 1769. Despite the lack of sources, it has remained in the public consciousness and the phrase has become invariantly linked with the event.

== Notable Uses ==
- In April 1653, Oliver Cromwell said "In the name of God, go" to the Rump Parliament.
- In the Norway Debate in May 1940, Leo Amery said "In the name of God, go" to Neville Chamberlain. Amery used this phrase as a political construct to call back to its origins, by associating Neville Chamberlain with the Rump Parliament, which was associated with corruption.
- The phrase was used on the 12th of May 2009 by The Telegraph to criticise members of parliament following the 2009 parliamentary expenses scandal, after the newspaper had acquired a leaked version of the expenses disclosure during the controversy.
- On 18 May 2009, the phrase was utilised by The Sun as a headline, during its criticism of the Brown ministry and support of a general election.
- In January 2022, David Davis said "In the name of God, go" to Boris Johnson, calling back to both previous uses of the phrase.

== See also ==
- In the name of God
