= Blacksmoke =

- A Blacksmoke Stamp of Mass Destruction by Jimmy Cauty

Background information
- Also known as: The Blacksmoke Organisation
- Years active: 2003-2010
- Members: Jimmy Cauty; James Fogarty

Blacksmoke (also known as The Blacksmoke Organisation) is an occasional art collective and musical group. Founding members include Jimmy Cauty of The KLF, heavy metal musician James Fogarty, and Keir (ex-manager of The Black Dog and 808 State). Blacksmoke output includes original music, remix and production, compositions for films and TV, as well as photography and video.

== Background ==
Among the work so far produced by the Blacksmoke Organisation are limited edition prints of stamps known as The Stamps of Mass Destruction the Post Terrorist Modernist EP, and the Post-Terrorism Xmas Shop. The anger over 9/11 is immediately apparent in the samples and vocals of many of the original tracks as well as the graphics.

=== Stamps of Mass Destruction ===
Limited edition prints of first-, second- and third-class stamps featuring the Queen's head with a gas mask on. These were exhibited at the artrepublic gallery in Brighton, until they earned the attention of the Royal Mail. All unsold copies of the stamps of mass destruction prints were sent to the Royal Mail for destruction. A second series of the stamps was later released: fourth-, fifth- and sixth-class, which had the Queen's head completely engulfed in a chemical warfare protection suit and thus were presumably not subject to the legal action taken by the Royal Mail.

== Musical outputs ==
=== 2003 ===
Post Terrorist Modernism DIY MP3 EP cover

The first Blacksmoke releases were MP3s hosted on the Blacksmoke website, the tracks including "Gimpo Gimpo" and a remix of same entitled "Fuck the Fucking Fuckers". K Foundation collaborator Gimpo who is organiser of the annual "M25 SPIN" was the inspiration for the track but, contrary to reports, has not provided vocals.

On 23 September 2003, BBC Radio 1's Breezeblock with Mary Anne Hobbs show broadcast a 15-minute mix session. The session comprised the MP3s cut together with samples of mobile phones and Big Ben plus other sound effects. The BBC cut the final 3 minutes 30 seconds from the session due to the post Iraq war political climate. The cut material was "Silent Night", one of the previously available download-only tracks. A few months later, the collective added an MP3 of the Breezeblock version of "Silent Night" to their website for download.

On 5 November 2003 Blacksmoke made available an MP3 EP on their website which they described as "post-terrorist modernism for the Boom Bang Generation". A Blacksmoke press release drew connections with Bonfire Night and called Guy Fawkes Britain's "most notorious terrorist". The downloadable cover art featured Big Ben exploding like the World Trade Center and asked if the artwork "depicted the destruction of government buildings in Baghdad or Kabul, would we pay any attention?" There were media reports of "outrage".

=== 2004 onwards ===
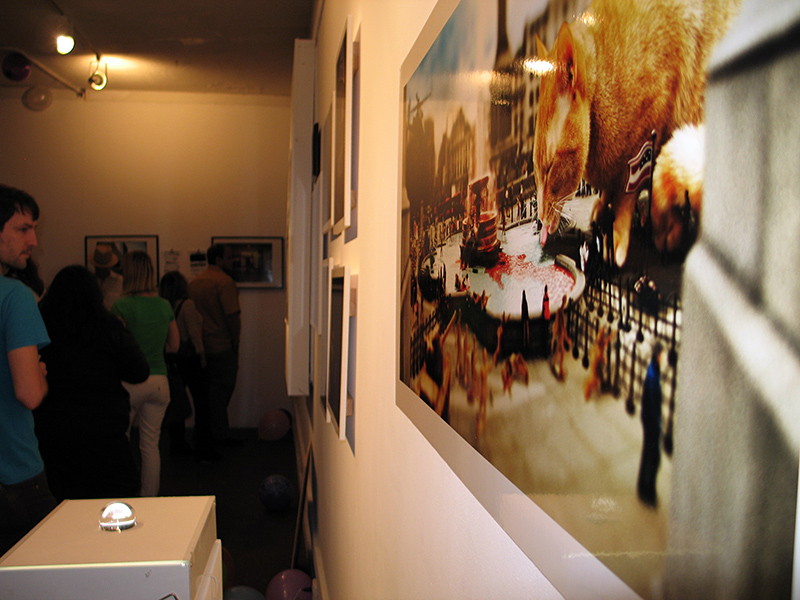
Tom & Jerry by The Blacksmoke Organisation

In July 2004 Blacksmoke appeared at The Big Chill festival. Cauty played an eclectic and experimental DJ set, which he described as "an updated version of [The KLF's ambient album] Chill Out", while a film by Gimpo called Docklands Light Railway was screened. An alternative version of the soundtrack to the film was later featured as an hour-long mix radio session on Resonance FM on 28 August. This was described as an industrial ambient mix.

The Blacksmoke Organisation were commissioned by Disney to rework the original theme tune to their 1960s movie "The Love Bug" for a 2005 remake entitled Herbie: Fully Loaded. Blacksmoke produced two versions, appearing within the movie and on the Herbie: Fully Loaded soundtrack.

In May 2008 The Blacksmoke Organisation exhibited a new artwork entitled "Tom & Jerry" at the Photo Fictions: New Narrative Photography exhibition, held at the Show Cave Gallery in Los Angeles.

== Discography ==
=== Singles ===
- Gimpo Gimpo (Kompressor Radio Edit) - January 24, 2003
- My Fucking Heart Will Go On - October 2, 2003
- Post-Terrorist Modernism (D.I.Y. MP3) - November 5, 2003
- I'm Dreaming Of A Black X-Mas - December 25, 2004 / Re-Distributed December 25, 2007
- Gimpo Gimpo (FvM Mix) - 2005

=== Albums & EPs ===
- Post-Terrorist Modernism (EP) - 2007
- The Future Sounds of Mu Mu (2007 What The Fuck's Now Going On?) - 2007
- Danger Global Warming EP 1 - June 2008
- Danger Global Warming EP 2 - July 2008

=== DVD / Films ===
- Docklands Light Railway - 2006 (DVRr)

=== Other Appearances ===
- Hannah Have A Guinness (Blacksmoke Remix) - Featured on 'The M25 Spin 2005' & 'The M25 Spin 2007 Sampler' - 2007
- Armed Love (Blacksmoke Remix) - Featured on 'Heartattack Compilation Vol. 1 アタック・オブ・ザ・バンド' - 2004

== Remixes ==
Blacksmoke have done a number of distinctive remixes of other artists. Some of them have been available for download from their website, others are available on commercial recordings.

- a-ha – "Cosy Prisons (a-ha inhale Blacksmoke)" & "Cosy Prisons (The Product Of The 21st Century Remix)"
- A Texas Tale of Treason - "Waldo's Hawaiian Holiday (Waldo inhales Blacksmoke)"
- Bloodhound Gang – "Foxtrot Uniform Charlie Kilo (The Blacksmoke Organisation Mix)"
- Emperor – "I Am the Black Wizards (Emperor inhale Blacksmoke)"
- Blonde from Fargo – "U Don't Want Me (Blacksmoke Remix)"
- Deep Purple – "Fear No Evil" (a remix of "Black Night")
- DJ Pierre – "No More War (DJ Pierre inhales Blacksmoke Mix)"
- Cradle of Filth – "Mannequin (Cradle of Filth inhale Blacksmoke)"
- Gay for Johnny Depp – "Shh, Put the Shiv to My Throat (Gay for Johnny Depp inhale Blacksmoke)"
- Goldie Lookin Chain – "R'n'B (Goldie Lookin Chain inhale Blacksmoke)"
- Les Six – "Died for a Day (Blacksmoke U.K. Mix)"
- Prada-Meinhof Gang – "Hammer Of The Goddess (Blacksmoke Remix)"
- The Dandy Warhols – "We Used to Be Friends (Blacksmoke Remix)"
- The (International) Noise Conspiracy inhale Blacksmoke – "Armed Love (Blacksmoke Remix)"
- iamamiwhoami – "U by The Blacksmoke Organisation"
