= Failure of the Grand Design =

Failure Of The Grand Design

Studio album by The Resonance Association
- Released: 22 October 2007
- Recorded: January – August 2007
- Genre: Dark ambient, electronica, krautrock, drone
- Length: 53:48
- Label: Burning Shed

The Resonance Association chronology
| Failure Of The Grand Design (2007) | We Still Have The Stars (2008) |

Failure Of The Grand Design is the debut album from London-based band The Resonance Association, and was released via Burning Shed in October 2007. Described as "the best and most intense album released in 2007" by music website Cool Noise (where it was also named as "album of the year"); progressive site DPRP concluded that the band had "a unique sound devoid, for the most part, of any similarity to other bands" in its favourable review.

In 2010, Failure Of The Grand Design was re-released digitally with 5 bonus tracks.

== Track listing ==
All music is composed by Daniel Vincent & Dominic Hemy

| No. | Title | Length |
|---|---|---|
| 1. | "The Darkening Storm" | 4:48 |
| 2. | "Left Hemisphere" | 9:40 |
| 3. | "God Is In Tiny Boxes" | 9:10 |
| 4. | "Magnetaphon" | 2:23 |
| 5. | "I Have Seen The Future, And I Am Not In It" | 9:55 |
| 6. | "Right Hemisphere" | 3:11 |
| 7. | "Three Hundred And Sixty Degree View" | 5:00 |
| 8. | "Electrolyte" | 5:03 |
| 9. | "Disintegration Of The Grand Design" | 4:35 |

2010 Digital Bonus Tracks
| No. | Title | Length |
|---|---|---|
| 10. | "Montag Morgen (Home Demo)" | 5:20 |
| 11. | "Left Hemisphere (Overloaded Mix)" | 6:32 |
| 12. | "Electrolyte (Single Mix)" | 3:21 |
| 13. | "Left Hemisphere (Live)" | 6:24 |
| 14. | "Disintegration Of The Grand Design (Live)" | 4:23 |

== Personnel ==
The Resonance Association

- Daniel Vincent - acoustic, electric and bass guitars, synthesisers, piano, programming, sound manipulation.
- Dominic Hemy - electric and bass guitars, theremin, synthesisers, field recordings.

Additional personnel

- Daniel Vincent and Dominic Hemy - production, mixing.
- Christopher Hemy - mastering.
- Lisa Vincent - photography
- Carl Glover - graphic design
