= The Excommunication of Christ =

Studio album by The Meads of Asphodel
- Released: October 1, 2001
- Genre: Black metal
- Length: 48:48
- Label: Supernal Music

The Meads of Asphodel chronology
The Watchers of Catal Huyuk (1999)	The Excommunication of Christ (2001)	Jihad / Freezing Moon (2002)

The Excommunication of Christ is the first full-length studio album by the black metal band The Meads of Asphodel. It was released on Supernal Music in 2001. The band's debut album, this featured A.C.Wild from Italian thrash legends Bulldozer re-working the narrative originally found on Bulldozer's first album, The Day of Wrath. It is an exorcism in Latin and sets the tone of the rest. Huw Lloyd Langton plays lead guitar on the Hawkwind cover, Assault and Battery. The track Jezebel and the Philistines was contributed by History of Guns in collaboration with Metatron.

== Track listing ==
1. The Excommunication of Christ - 1:30
2. Angelwhore - 3:16
3. The Watchers of Catal Huyuk - 4:46
4. Agrat Bat Malah - 4:53
5. Weeping Tears of Angel Light - 3:17
6. Bene Ha Elohim - 3:56
7. Assault and Battery (Hawkwind cover) - 4:02
8. Jezebel and the Philistines - 4:25
9. Pale Dread Hunger - 5:38
10. Rise in Godless Hell - 4:07
11. Disembodied Voices of Melchizeden - 2:01
12. Falling with Lightning Rays Beamed through the Blazing Firmament Towards the Untented Burial Ground of Kharsag - 2:11
13. Calling All Monsters - 4:46
