= Jihad / Freezing Moon =

- Cover of Jihad (The Meads of Asphodel)

Studio album by The Meads of Asphodel and Mayhem
- Released: 2002
- Genres: Black metal, experimental
- Length: 35:36
- Label: Supernal

The Meads of Asphodel chronology
The Excommunication of Christ (2001)	Jihad / Freezing Moon (2002)	The Bulldozer Armageddon Vol. V (2003)

Mayhem chronology
European Legions (2001)	Jihad / Freezing Moon (2002)	Legions of War (2003)

Alternative cover
- Cover of Freezing Moon (Mayhem)

Jihad / Freezing Moon is a split album with music by the black metal bands The Meads of Asphodel and Mayhem. Tracks one through six were performed by The Meads of Asphodel. Tracks seven and eight were performed by Mayhem. Tracks five and six are only available on the CD version.

The release features two live Mayhem rehearsals from 1991 with Dead on vocals. The Meads showcased songs with a lyrical concept on Middle Eastern terrorism. The track, "Grisly Din of Killing Steel", has the Twin Towers plane impact sounds over the narrative. This was the last release to feature Jaldaboath in The Meads of Asphodel. History of Guns contributed keyboards on the Hawkwind cover, Assassins of Allah. The split was released in a limited 10” vinyl version and a CD version with two bonus tracks.

== Track listing ==
The Meads of Asphodel

1. "Intro" – 2:03
2. "Jihad: The Grisly Din of Killing Steel" – 6:07
3. "Paradise" – 4:14
4. "Another God in Another Place" – 4:20
5. "Tanks in the Holy Land" – 3:23
6. "Assassins of Allah" – 5:26

Mayhem

7. "Carnage" – 3:47
8. "Freezing Moon" – 6:16
