= In the Name of God, Welcome to Planet Genocide =

EP by The Meads of Asphodel
- Released: 2006
- Genre: Black metal
- Length: 56:18
- Label: Firestorm Records

The Meads of Asphodel chronology
Damascus Steel (2005)	In the Name of God, Welcome to Planet Genocide (2006)	Life Is Shit (2007)

In the Name of God, Welcome to Planet Genocide is the first EP released by the black metal band The Meads of Asphodel. It was released on Firestorm Records in 2006. This is a short glance at human hatred, looking upon the theme of Genocide beyond the archetypal Hitler associated atrocities.

== Track listing ==
1. Psalm 364 - 2:30
2. My Beautiful Genocide - 4:43
3. A Baptism in the Warm Piss of Slaughtered Children - 4:53
4. The Man Who Killed for God - 6:25
5. March Towards Annihilation - 1:37
6. Hell on Earth / Blood Runs Red (Discharge cover medley) - 2:52
7. Aborted Stygian Foetus - 33:16
