= Heathen Harvest =

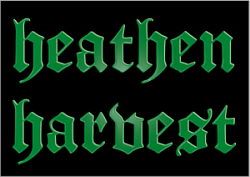
- Website type: Music webzine
- Available in: English
- Owner: Sage Weatherford
- Creator: Malahki Thorn
- Website: heathenharvest.org
- Commercial: No
- Registration: No
- Launched: 2003
- Current status: Closed / Archived

Heathen Harvest was an Internet blog devoted to music criticism, music news, and interviews. It focused on underground and post-industrial music, including ambient, heavy metal, gothic, and industrial music.

The site, which was established in 2003, was one of the longest-running webzines of its kind and has been dubbed "one of the leading online magazines for post-industrial music" and "the internet's foremost authority on neofolk." The website temporarily closed in June 2010 but was relaunched in July 2011 at a different domain. The staff stopped publishing new content in August 2019, without explanation, and by January 2020, the domain had expired.

== History ==
Heathen Harvest has given support to many underground artists and rarely features mainstream bands. It has a current review archive of over 4,800 individual reviews of underground music albums. Heathen Harvest originally began as the Heathen Harvest Music Review, written by Malahki Thorn for RFD Magazine in 2002. Thorn had moved from San Francisco to pursue a quieter life away from the city in Trinity County, California and wanted to share his high-school influences through post-industrial music with the Radical Faeries community.

In December 2006, the site design was overhauled and the magazine began publishing on a bi-monthly basis. Multiple journalists collectively contributed over one hundred articles per month, such as Nick Quarm, Sage L. Weatherford, Patrick O’sullivan and Elena ZG, who would make up the core of the magazine for most of this period.

Soon more journalists were welcomed onboard but eventually (with the exception of Sage L. Weatherford, Patrick O’sullivan, and Elena ZG), all of this original group left or were dismissed. A handful of new writers entered Heathen Harvest, but gradually those running the webzine began to burn out due to the amount of money and time it was taking to process the immense amount of material submitted.

The US record label First Fallen Star said of the webzine, "amid an ocean of pathetic websites offering up poorly written one-paragraph reviews merely to justify turning around and selling the albums on eBay for profit, Heathen Harvest was always, and continues to be, a site diligently maintained by a group of serious people, writing serious reviews of the music we all love". Heathen Harvest has been entirely self-financed and non-profit since its foundation, being driven purely by volunteer staff "motivated by their love of music and art".

== Closure, relaunch, and final closure ==
In June 2010, Thorn announced that issue 84 of Heathen Harvest was to be the final issue, citing financial concerns as the reason for the closure. At the start of 2011, a collective of the old Heathen Harvest staff assembled to officially restart the webzine in a blog format on a different server. It took several months to restart the webzine and the new site was finally launched on 4 July 2011 under the name of The Heathen Harvest Periodical to distinguish it from the old site, and under the new domain heathenharvest.org. The site worked mostly with digital review media and became more selective over what it reviewed. The old site, heathenharvest.com, remained online for archival purposes until 2013.

In early 2020, heathenharvest.org went offline. A user on the power electronics Special Interests forum relayed that the site had been shut down intentionally. There was no official announcement of the closure. An archive of the site's posts made between 2011 and 2016 remains online at the old Heathen Harvest blog.
