= The Meads of Asphodel =

English black metal band

- Origin: Hertfordshire, England
- Genres: Black metal, experimental, progressive metal
- Years active: 1998–present
- Labels: Candlelight Records, Firestorm Records, Godreah Records
- Members: Metatron; J.D. Tait; André Kjelbergvik Thung
- Website: Official site

The Meads of Asphodel are an English black metal band from Hertfordshire. They have medieval, Arab, punk, and progressive metal influences.

== History ==
Metatron and Jaldaboath formed the band in mid-1998. They aimed to "create heavy guitar-based original Black Metal with Medieval/Eastern influences and a lyrical concept derived from Christ's mortality, Biblical Apocrypha, Fallen Angels and Death." Their demos The Bemoaning of Metatron and Metatron and the Red Gleaming Serpent gained them critical attention in both underground and mainstream metal press, including a mention in Kerrang! magazine. They signed to Supernal Music after the release of their final demo, The Watchers of Catal Huyuk. Their albums, particularly 2001's The Excommunication of Christ, offer an anti-Christian interpretation of the Bible and Apocrypha. Despite a fluctuating line-up, the band continues to release music.

The band often use guest musicians. They have had a large roster of guests, including members of Hawkwind, Sigh, Amebix, Mael Mordha, Taake, and a Rabbi.

== Members ==
Current members

- Metatron – Vocals (1998–present)
- J.D. Tait – Guitars, keyboards, vocals (2002–present)
- André Kjelbergvik Thung – Drums (2012–present)

Former members

- Jaldaboath – Guitars, music programming, vocals, bass, keyboards (1998–2002)
- Urakbaramel – Drums (2002–2012)
- Max Rael (History of Guns) – Keyboards, programming (2001–2007)
- Paul Carter – Keyboards (2003)
- Deorth – Bass (2003)
- Pope Richard Alan Weeks – Bass (2015–2018)

Session musicians and guests

- Alan Davey – Bass (2002–2014)
- Mirai – Keyboards
- Huw Lloyd-Langton – Lead guitar (2000–2007)
- The Mad Mullah – drums (2002)

== Discography ==
=== Studio albums ===
- The Excommunication of Christ (Supernal, 2001)
- Exhuming the Grave of Yeshua (Supernal, 2003)
- Damascus Steel (Supernal, 2005)
- The Murder of Jesus the Jew (Candlelight Records, 2010)
- Sonderkommando (Candlelight Records, 2013)
- Running Out of Time Doing Nothing (Godreah Records, 2019)

=== EPs and splits ===
- Freezing Moon/Jihad split with Mayhem (Supernal, 2002)
- In the Name of God, Welcome to Planet Genocide EP (Firestorm, 2006)
- Life is Shit EP (Firestorm, 2007)
- English Black Punk Metal/The Bones of This Land are Not Speechless split with Old Corpse Road (Godreah, 2010)
- Taste the Divine Wrath split with Tjolgtjar (Eternal Death, 2015)
- Imperial East-West Onslaught split with Rerthro (2018)
- The Voiceless Dust of Ages EP (2018)
- Tomb Songs From a Dying Bedlamite EP (Godreah, 2024)

=== Demos ===
- The Bemoaning of Metatron (demo, 1998)
- Metatron and the Gleaming Red Serpent (demo, 1999)
- The Watchers of Catal Huyuk (demo, 1999)

=== Live ===
- The Mill Hill Sessions (Godreah, 2004)

=== Compilations ===
- Britannia Infernus: A History of British Occult and Black (Godreah, 2002)
- Daze of the Underground: A Tribute to Hawkwind (Godreah, 2003)
- The Early Years (compilation of unreleased material from 1998–2002) (Godreah, 2009)
- Swine of Hades (Godreah, 2011)
- Voices from Valhalla: A Tribute to Bathory (Godreah, 2012)
- The Meads of Asphodel boxed Set (Fallen-Angels Productions, 2013)
- The Middle Ages (Sixsixsix Music, 2014)
- Split Promo with The Wolves of Avalon (Sixsixsix Music, 2014)
- We Worship Desaster: A Tribute to Desaster (Grom records, 2014)
- Desolate Hymns for a Fallen God (Covers Album) (Azermedoth Records, 2015)
- Tales From Bedlam (Valgriind, 2015)

=== Singles ===
- "All Things Bright & Shit" – Terrorizer Xmas Song (Terrorizer, 2006)
- "The Song of a Hundred Roars" – Terrorizer Magazine Xmas Song (Terrorizer, 2009)
